= South Africa at the 2014 Commonwealth Games =

- CG code: RSA
- CGA: South African Sports Confederation and Olympic Committee
- Website: sascoc.co.za

in Glasgow, Scotland
- Flag bearer: Cecil Afrika
- Medals Ranked 7th: Gold 13 Silver 10 Bronze 17 Total 40

Commonwealth Games appearances (overview)
- 1930; 1934; 1938; 1950; 1954; 1958; 1962–1990; 1994; 1998; 2002; 2006; 2010; 2014; 2018; 2022; 2026; 2030

South Africa competed in the 2014 Commonwealth Games in Glasgow, Scotland from 23 July – 3 August 2014. It is the sixth occasion that South Africa has been represented at the Commonwealth Games since re-joining the Commonwealth in 1994 after a break of 33 years during the international sports isolation period. The squad is spread over 15 codes, from aquatics to wrestling.

== Medalists ==
| Medal | Name | Sport | Event | Date |
|---|---|---|---|---|
| Gold | Zack Piontek | Judo | Men's 90 kg | July 25 |
| Gold | Annatjie van Rooyen; Gwen Nel; Geoff Newcombe; Herman Scholtz | Lawn bowls | Mixed para-sport pairs | July 26 |
| Gold | Chad le Clos | Swimming | Men's 200 metre butterfly | July 26 |
| Gold | Esme Steyn; Susan Nel; Santjie Steyn; Tracy-Lee Botha | Lawn bowls | Women's fours | July 27 |
| Gold | South Africa national rugby sevens team: Branco du Preez; Cecil Afrika; Chris Dry; Cornal Hendricks; Frankie Horne; Justin Geduld; Kyle Brown; Kwagga Smith; Mark Richards; Seabelo Senatla; Werner Kok; Warren Whiteley | Rugby sevens | Men's event | July 27 |
| Gold | Fanie van der Merwe | Athletics | Men's 100 metres (T37) | July 28 |
| Gold | Bobby Donnelly; Petrus Breitenbach; Prince Neluonde | Lawn bowls | Men's triples | July 28 |
| Gold | Chad le Clos | Swimming | Men's 100 metre butterfly | July 28 |
| Gold | Cameron van der Burgh | Swimming | Men's 50 metre breaststroke | July 28 |
| Gold | Cornel Fredericks | Athletics | Men's 400 metres hurdles | July 31 |
| Gold | Deon van de Vyver; Roger Hagerty; Derrick Lobban | Lawn bowls | Open para-sport triples | July 31 |
| Gold | Colleen Piketh; Tracy-Lee Botha | Lawn bowls | Women's pairs | August 1 |
| Gold | Khotso Mokoena | Athletics | Men's triple jump | August 2 |
| Silver | Richard Murray; Gillian Sanders; Henri Schoeman; Kate Roberts | Triathlon | Mixed relay | July 24 |
| Silver | Roland Schoeman | Swimming | Men's 50 metre butterfly | July 25 |
| Silver | Chad le Clos; Roland Schoeman; Calvyn Justus*; Clayton Jimmie*; Caydon Muller; Leith Shankland | Swimming | Men's 4 × 100 m freestyle relay | July 25 |
| Silver | Ruan Snyman | Judo | Men's +100 kg | July 26 |
| Silver | Cameron van der Burgh | Swimming | Men's 100 metre breaststroke | July 26 |
| Silver | Charl du Toit | Athletics | Men's 100 metres (T37) | July 28 |
| Silver | Esmari van Reenen | Shooting | Women's 50 metre rifle prone | July 28 |
| Silver | Zarck Visser | Athletics | Men's long jump | July 30 |
| Silver | Wayde van Niekerk | Athletics | Men's 400 metres | July 30 |
| Silver | Sunette Viljoen | Athletics | Women's javelin throw | July 30 |
| Bronze | Richard Murray | Triathlon | Men's | July 24 |
| Bronze | Jacques van Zyl | Judo | Men's 73 kg | July 25 |
| Bronze | Siyabulela Mabulu | Judo | Men's 66 kg | July 25 |
| Bronze | Chad le Clos | Swimming | Men's 50 metre butterfly | July 25 |
| Bronze | Sebastien Rousseau | Swimming | Men's 400 metre individual medley | July 25 |
| Bronze | Sebastien Rousseau | Swimming | Men's 200 metre butterfly | July 26 |
| Bronze | Chad le Clos; Calvyn Justus*; Sebastien Rousseau; Dylan Bosch; Devon Brown | Swimming | Men's 4 × 200 m freestyle relay | July 27 |
| Bronze | Sebastien Rousseau; Cameron van der Burgh; Chad le Clos; Leith Shankland | Swimming | Men's 4 × 100 m medley relay | July 29 |
| Bronze | Colleen Piketh | Lawn bowls | Women's singles | July 27 |
| Bronze | Chad le Clos | Swimming | Men's 200 metre individual medley | July 29 |
| Bronze | Rushwahl Samaai | Athletics | Men's long jump | July 30 |
| Bronze | Mpho Madi | Wrestling | Women's 53 kg | July 30 |
| Bronze | André Olivier | Athletics | Men's 800 metres | July 31 |
| Bronze | Esme Steyn; Santjie Steyn; Susan Nel | Lawn bowls | Women's Triples | July 31 |
| Bronze | Armando Hietbrink | Wrestling | Men's 86 kg | July 31 |
| Bronze | Tulani Mbenge | Boxing | Men's Welterweight | August 1 |
| Bronze | Ashleigh Moolman Pasio | Cycling | Women's road race | August 2 |

* - Indicates the athlete competed in preliminaries but not the final

Medals by sport
| Sport | 1st place, gold medalist(s) | 2nd place, silver medalist(s) | 3rd place, bronze medalist(s) | Total |
| Athletics | 3 | 4 | 2 | 9 |
| Boxing | 0 | 0 | 1 | 1 |
| Cycling | 0 | 0 | 1 | 1 |
| Judo | 1 | 1 | 2 | 4 |
| Lawn bowls | 5 | 0 | 2 | 7 |
| Rugby sevens | 1 | 0 | 0 | 1 |
| Shooting | 0 | 1 | 0 | 1 |
| Swimming | 3 | 3 | 6 | 12 |
| Triathlon | 0 | 1 | 1 | 2 |
| Wrestling | 0 | 0 | 2 | 2 |
| Total | 13 | 10 | 17 | 40 |

== Athletics ==
Men
Track & road events

| Athlete | Event | Heat | | Semifinal | | Final | |
| Athlete | Event | Result | Rank | Result | Rank | Result | Rank |
|---|---|---|---|---|---|---|---|
| Simon Magakwe | 100 m | 10.34 | 2 Q | 10.33 | 7 | Did not advance | |
| Akani Simbine | 100 m | 10.32 | 1 Q | 10.21 | 4 | Did not advance | |
| Ncincilili Titi | 100 m | 10.48 =PB | 4 | Did not advance | | | |
| Andrea Dalle Ave | 100 m (T37) | 12.61 | 3 Q | —N/a | | 12.39 SB | 4 |
| Fanie van der Merwe | 100 m (T37) | 11.75 | 1 Q | —N/a | | 11.65 | 1st place, gold medalist(s) |
| Charl du Toit | 100 m (T37) | 12.02 | 1 Q | —N/a | | 11.89 | 2nd place, silver medalist(s) |
| Akani Simbine | 200 m | 20.77 | 2 Q | 20.53 | 2 Q | 20.37 PB | 5 |
| Ncincilili Titi | 200 m | 20.66 | 1 Q | Disqualified | | Did not advance | |
| Wayde van Niekerk | 200 m | 20.84 | 2 Q | 20.69 | 5 | Did not advance | |
| Wayde van Niekerk | 400 m | 46.87 | 3 Q | 45.41 | 2 Q | 44.68 | 2nd place, silver medalist(s) |
| André Olivier | 800 m | 1:47.93 | 1 Q | 1:46.30 | 3 Q | 1:46.03 | 3rd place, bronze medalist(s) |
| Johan Cronje | 1500 m | 3:40.17 | 3 Q | —N/a | | 3:39.65 | 4 |
| Cornel Fredericks | 400 m hurdles | 49.26 | 1 Q | —N/a | | 48.50 | 1st place, gold medalist(s) |
| Louis Van Zyl | 400 m hurdles | 50.07 | 3 | —N/a | | Did not advance | |
| Henricho Bruintjies; Simon Magakwe; Ncincilili Titi; Simbine Akani | 4 × 100 metres relay | 38.91 | 2 Q | —N/a | | 38.35 | 4 |

Field Events

| Athlete | Event | Qualification | | Final | |
| Athlete | Event | Distance | Rank | Distance | Rank |
|---|---|---|---|---|---|
| Rushwahl Samaai | Long jump | 8.03 | 2 Q | 8.08 | 3rd place, bronze medalist(s) |
| Zarck Visser | Long jump | 7.99 | 3 Q | 8.12 | 2nd place, silver medalist(s) |
| Khotso Mokoena | Triple jump | 16.69 SB | 3 Q | 17.20 SB | 1st place, gold medalist(s) |
| Orazio Cremona | Shot put | 20.03 | 3 Q | 20.13 | 4 |
| Victor Hogan | Discus throw | 64.16 SB | 2 Q | 56.42 | 10 |
| Lean Simon | Discus throw (F42/44) | —N/a | | 46.39 | 5 |
| Rocco van Rooyen | Javelin throw | 77.57 | 7 q | 76.84 | 6 |

Combined events – Decathlon

| Athlete | Event | 100 m | LJ | SP | HJ | 400 m | 110H | DT | PV | JT | 1500 m | Final | Rank |
|---|---|---|---|---|---|---|---|---|---|---|---|---|---|
| Willem Coertzen | Result | 10.88 | 7.4 | 13.7 | 1.87 | DNS | DNS | DNS | DNS | DNS | DNS | DNF | 17 |
| Willem Coertzen | Points | 888 | 910 | 710 | 687 | 0 | 0 | 0 | 0 | 0 | 0 | DNF | 17 |
| Fredriech Pretorius | Result | 11.29 | 7.13 | 11.86 | 1.9 | 49.31 | 14.62 | 40.61 | 4.59 | 58.76 | 4:28.33 | 7639 | 7 |
| Fredriech Pretorius | Points | 797 | 845 | 598 | 714 | 847 | 896 | 677 | 790 | 719 | 756 | 7639 | 7 |

Women
Track & road events

| Athlete | Event | Heat | | Semifinal | | Final | |
| Athlete | Event | Result | Rank | Result | Rank | Result | Rank |
|---|---|---|---|---|---|---|---|
| Wenda Theron | 400 m hurdles | 56.38 | 2 Q | —N/a | | Disqualified | |

Field Events

| Athlete | Event | Qualification | | Final | |
| Athlete | Event | Distance | Position | Distance | Position |
|---|---|---|---|---|---|
| Juanelie Meijer | Long jump (F37/38) | —N/a | | 4.06 | 5 |
| Sunette Viljoen | Javelin throw | —N/a | | 63.19 | 2nd place, silver medalist(s) |

== Badminton ==
Mixed team

Pool E

| Pos | Team | Pld | W | L | GF | GA | GD | PF | PA | PD | Pts | Qualification |
|---|---|---|---|---|---|---|---|---|---|---|---|---|
| 1 | Singapore | 3 | 3 | 0 | 30 | 1 | +29 | 644 | 278 | +366 | 3 | Quarterfinals |
| 2 | South Africa | 3 | 2 | 1 | 18 | 14 | +4 | 551 | 457 | +94 | 2 | |
| 3 | Jamaica | 3 | 1 | 2 | 15 | 18 | −3 | 527 | 510 | +17 | 1 | |
| 4 | Norfolk Island | 3 | 0 | 3 | 0 | 30 | −30 | 153 | 630 | −477 | 0 | |

Source: glasgow2014.com

Norfolk Island
0
Commonwealth Arena, Glasgow
24 July

South Africa
5

| | | | 1 | 2 | 3 |
|---|---|---|---|---|---|
| 1 | (Norfolk Island) (South Africa) | Jason Quintal / Terry Gray; Andries Malan / Jennifer Fry | 3; 21 | 3; 21 |
| 2 | (Norfolk Island) (South Africa) | Richard Cribb; Jacob Maliekal | 3; 21 | 2; 21 |
| 3 | (Norfolk Island) (South Africa) | Joanne Snell; Elme de Villiers | 5; 21 | 4; 21 |
| 4 | (Norfolk Island) (South Africa) | Jason Quintal / Michael Donohoe; Andries Malan / Willem Viljoen | 3; 21 | 3; 21 |
| 5 | (Norfolk Island) (South Africa) | Joanne Snell / Terry Gray; Sandra le Grange / Elme de Villiers | 10; 21 | 8; 21 |

Singapore
5
Commonwealth Arena, Glasgow
25 July

South Africa
0

| | | | 1 | 2 | 3 |
|---|---|---|---|---|---|
| 1 | (Singapore) (South Africa) | Chayut Triyachart / Terry Hee; Andries Malan / Willem Viljoen | 21; 12 | 21; 16 |
| 2 | (Singapore) (South Africa) | Liang Xiaoyu; Elme de Villiers | 21; 9 | 21; 9 |
| 3 | (Singapore) (South Africa) | Huang Chao; Jacob Maliekal | 21; 11 | 21; 11 |
| 4 | (Singapore) (South Africa) | Yao Lei / Shinta Mulia Sari; Sandra le Grange / Elme de Villiers | 21; 9 | 21; 14 |
| 5 | (Singapore) (South Africa) | Danny Bawa Chrisnanta / Vanessa Neo; Andries Malan / Jennifer Fry | 21; 13 | 21; 12 |

South Africa
3
Commonwealth Arena, Glasgow
26 July

Jamaica
2

| | | | 1 | 2 | 3 |
|---|---|---|---|---|---|
| 1 | (South Africa) (Jamaica) | Andries Malan / Jennifer Fry; Garron Palmer / Geordine Henry | 21; 12 | 14; 21 | 15; 21 |
| 2 | (South Africa) (Jamaica) | Prakash Vijayanath; Gareth Henry | 16; 21 | 23; 21 | 10; 21 |
| 3 | (South Africa) (Jamaica) | Elme de Villiers; Ruth Williams | 21; 12 | 21; 18 |
| 4 | (South Africa) (Jamaica) | Willem Viljoen / Andries Malan; Geordine Henry / Garron Palmer | 21; 17 | 21; 16 |
| 5 | (South Africa) (Jamaica) | Sandra le Grange / Jennifer Fry; Ruth Williams / Geordine Henry | 21; 8 | 21; 15 |

== Boxing ==
Men

== Cycling ==
=== Mountain biking ===
| Athlete | Event | Time | Rank |
|---|---|---|---|
| Philip Buys | Men's cross-country | 1:48:34 | 13 |
| Mariske Strauss | Women's cross-country | 1:47.17 | 7 |

=== Road ===
Women

| Athlete | Event | Time | Rank |
|---|---|---|---|
| Heidi Dalton | Road race | DNF | |
| Heidi Dalton | Time trial | 48:22.03 | 22 |
| An-Li Kachelhoffer | Road race | 2:51:00 | 42 |
| Lise Olivier | Road race | DNF | |
| Ashleigh Pasio | Road race | 2:39:54 | 3rd place, bronze medalist(s) |
| Ashleigh Pasio | Time trial | 45:58.07 | 15 |
| Anriette Schoeman | Road race | DNF | |
| Cherise Stander | Road race | DNF | |

=== Track ===
Sprint

| Athlete | Event | Qualification | | Round 1 | Repechage | Quarterfinals | Semifinals | Final | |
| Athlete | Event | Time Speed (km/h) | Rank | Opposition Time Speed (km/h) | Opposition Time Speed (km/h) | Opposition Time | Opposition Time | Opposition Time | Rank |
|---|---|---|---|---|---|---|---|---|---|
| Bernard Esterhuizen | Men's sprint | 10.317; 69.787 | 16 | Did not advance | | | | | |

Pursuit

| Athlete | Event | Qualification | | Final | |
| Athlete | Event | Time | Rank | Opponent Results | Rank |
|---|---|---|---|---|---|
| Oupa Maluleke | Men's pursuit | 4:48.368 | 15 | Did not advance | |
| Theuns van der Bank | Men's pursuit | 4:40.041 | 13 | Did not advance | |
| Morne van Niekerk | Men's pursuit | 4:44.415 | 14 | Did not advance | |
| Theuns van der Bank; Nolan Hoffman; Kellan Gouveris; Evan Cartens | Men's team pursuit | 4:18.194 | 5 | Did not advance | |

Time trial

| Athlete | Event | Time | Rank |
|---|---|---|---|
| Bernard Esterhuizen | Men's time trial | 1:02.414 | 6 |

Points race

| Athlete | Event | Qualification | | Final | |
| Athlete | Event | Points | Rank | Points | Rank |
|---|---|---|---|---|---|
| Kellan Gouveris | Men's point race | 1 | 11 Q | DNF | |
| Nolan Hoffman | Men's point race | 5 | 9 Q | DNF | |
| Theuns van der Bank | Men's point race | -10 | 13 | Did not advance | |

Scratch race

| Athlete | Event | Qualification | Final |
| Athlete | Event | Rank | Rank |
|---|---|---|---|
| Evan Carstens | Men's scratch race | DNF | Did not advance |
| Kellan Gouveris | Men's scratch race | DNF | Did not advance |
| Nolan Hoffman | Men's scratch race | 6 Q | DNF |

Keirin

| Athlete | Event | Round 1 | Repechage | Semifinals | Final |
| Athlete | Event | Rank | Rank | Rank | Rank |
|---|---|---|---|---|---|
| Bernard Esterhuizen | Men's keirin | 2 Q | Bye | 6 | 8 |

== Field hockey ==
=== Men's tournament ===
Pool A

| Pos | Team | Pld | W | D | L | GF | GA | GD | Pts | Qualification |
|---|---|---|---|---|---|---|---|---|---|---|
| 1 | Australia | 4 | 4 | 0 | 0 | 22 | 3 | +19 | 12 | Semi-finals |
| 2 | India | 4 | 3 | 0 | 1 | 16 | 9 | +7 | 9 | Semi-finals |
| 3 | South Africa | 4 | 2 | 0 | 2 | 9 | 12 | −3 | 6 | |
| 4 | Scotland | 4 | 1 | 0 | 3 | 6 | 16 | −10 | 3 | |
| 5 | Wales | 4 | 0 | 0 | 4 | 6 | 19 | −13 | 0 | |

Source: FIH
Rules for classification: 1) points; 2) goal difference; 3) goals scored; 4) head-to-head result.

25 July 2014
11:00

| South Africa | 2–0 | Scotland |
|---|---|---|
| Cronje 41'; Malgraff 66' | Report |

Umpires:
Haider Rasool (PAK)
Adam Kearns (AUS)

28 July 2014
09:00

| South Africa | 0–6 | Australia |
|---|---|---|
| | Report | Mitton 8', 24'; Ciriello 27'; Orchard 46'; Govers 48', 64' |

Umpires:
Dan Barstow (ENG)
Gareth Greenfield (NZL)

29 July 2014
16:00

| Wales | 1–5 | South Africa |
|---|---|---|
| Gay 67' | Report | Malgraff 9'; Smith 35+', 44'; Hykes 46'; Eustice 64' |

Umpires:
Eric Koh (MAS)
Lim Hong Zhen (SIN)

31 July 2014
16:00

| South Africa | 2–5 | India |
|---|---|---|
| Paton 42'; Smith 47' | Report | Raghunath 3'; R. Singh 9'; Ra. Singh 22'; Sowmarpet 26'; M. Singh 58' |

Umpires:
Adam Kearns (AUS)
Gareth Greenfield (NZL)

==== Fifth and sixth place ====
2 August 2014
14:30

| South Africa | 7–3 | Canada |
|---|---|---|
| Norris-Jones 7', 68'; Drummond 33'; Smith 49'; Paton 57'; Halkett 62'; Hykes 66' | Report | Curran 17'; Smythe 28'; Johnston 37' |

Umpires:
Will Drury (WAL)
Haider Rasool (PAK)

=== Women's tournament ===
Pool A

| Team | Pld | W | D | L | GF | GA | GD | Pts | Qualification |
|---|---|---|---|---|---|---|---|---|---|
| New Zealand | 4 | 4 | 0 | 0 | 25 | 1 | +24 | 12 | Semi-finals |
| South Africa | 4 | 3 | 0 | 1 | 22 | 4 | +18 | 9 | Semi-finals |
| India | 4 | 2 | 0 | 2 | 20 | 8 | +12 | 6 | |
| Canada | 4 | 1 | 0 | 3 | 6 | 13 | −7 | 3 | |
| Trinidad and Tobago | 4 | 0 | 0 | 4 | 1 | 48 | −47 | 0 | |

24 July 2014
14:00

| South Africa | 16–0 | Trinidad and Tobago |
|---|---|---|
| Russell 8', 59'; Chamberlain 9', 30', 51', 55'; Damons 14', 41'; Evans 15', 36', 52'; Deetlefs 23'; Bright 34', 69'; Taylor 57', 64' | Report |

Umpires:
Dino Willox (WAL)
Miskarmalia Ariffin (SIN)

25 July 2014
21:00

| South Africa | 2–0 | Canada |
|---|---|---|
| Chamberlain 52', 55' | Report |

Umpires:
Sarah Wilson (SCO)
Ayana McClean (TRI)

28 July 2014
21:00

| South Africa | 1–2 | New Zealand |
|---|---|---|
| Bright 33' | Report | Punt 12'; Forgesson 51' |

Umpires:
Kylie Seymour (AUS)
Dino Willox (WAL)

30 July 2014
16:00

| India | 2–3 | South Africa |
|---|---|---|
| Kaur 34'; Rampal 59' | Report | Bright 14'; Chamberlain 35'; Davids 54' |

Umpires:
Hannah Sanders (ENG)
Dino Willox (WAL)

==== Semifinals ====
1 August 2014
12:15

| Australia | 7–1 | South Africa |
|---|---|---|
| Smith 17'; White 21', 47'; Parker 49', 57'; Claxton 50'; Nanscawen 67' | Report | Evans 53' |

Umpires:
Aleesha Unka (NZL)
Sarah Wilson (SCO)

==== Bronze medal match ====
2 August 2014
18:00

| South Africa | 2–5 | New Zealand (bronze) |
|---|---|---|
| Cox 24'; Taylor 49' | Report | Punt 6'; Forgesson 27'; Grant 55', 68'; Flynn 63' |

Umpires:
Sarah Wilson(SCO)
Kylie Seymour (AUS)

== Gymnastics ==
=== Artistic ===
Men

| Athlete | Event | Final | | | | | | | |
| Athlete | Event | Apparatus | | | | | | Total | Rank |
| Athlete | Event | F | PH | R | V | PB | HB | Total | Rank |
|---|---|---|---|---|---|---|---|---|---|
| Siphesihle Biyase | Team | 13.200 | 12.466 | 11.633 | 13.800 | 13.000 | 12.533 | —N/a | |
| Tiaan Grobler | Team | 12.833 | 12.466 | 12.833 | 13.233 | 12.666 | 12.566 | —N/a | |
| Cameron Mackenzie | Team | 13.666 | 10.866 | 12.700 | 13.533 | 12.866 | 9.800 | —N/a | |
| Siphamandala Ngcobo | Team | 13.400 | | 13.400 | 13.933 | 12.266 | | —N/a | |
| Total | Team | 40.266 | 35.798 | 38.933 | 41.226 | 38.532 | 34.899 | 229.694 | 9 |

Individual all around final

| Athlete | Event | Final | | | | | | | |
| Athlete | Event | Apparatus | | | | | | Total | Rank |
| Athlete | Event | F | PH | R | V | PB | HB | Total | Rank |
|---|---|---|---|---|---|---|---|---|---|
| Siphesihle Biyase | Individual | 12.466 | 12.566 | 11.800 | 13.800 | 12.966 | 12.200 | 75.798 | 22 |
| Tiaan Grobler | Individual | 13.066 | 12.400 | 13.766 | 13.366 | 12.433 | 12.333 | 77.364 | 16 |

Women

| Athlete | Event | Final | | | | | |
| Athlete | Event | Apparatus | | | | Total | Rank |
| Athlete | Event | V | UB | BB | F | Total | Rank |
|---|---|---|---|---|---|---|---|
| Kirsten Beckett | Team | 14.300 | 12.966 | 12.733 | 13.266 | 53.265 | 6 Q |
| Claudia Cummins | Team | 13.900 | 12.133 | 11.600 | 11.733 | 49.366 | 18 Q |
| Bianca Mann | Team | 13.366 | 12.100 | 11.600 | 12.366 | 48.732 | 20 Q |
| Total | Team | 41.566 | 37.199 | 35.233 | 37.365 | 151.363 | 6 |

Individual all around final

| Athlete | Event | Final | | | | | |
| Athlete | Event | Apparatus | | | | Total | Rank |
| Athlete | Event | V | UB | BB | F | Total | Rank |
|---|---|---|---|---|---|---|---|
| Kirsten Beckett | Individual | 13.900 | 12.300 | 11.700 | 11.633 | 49.533 | 15 |
| Claudia Cummins | Individual | 13.966 | 12.758 | 8.233 | 11.933 | 46.890 | 23 |
| Bianca Mann | Individual | 13.066 | 12.033 | 11.000 | 11.566 | 47.655 | 20 |

Individual finals

| Athlete | Event | Total | Rank |
|---|---|---|---|
| Kirsten Beckett | Floor | 13.000 | 8 |
| Kirsten Beckett | Uneven bars | 12.933 | 6 |
| Kirsten Beckett | Vault | 14.116 | 6 |

=== Rhythmic ===
Team

| Athlete | Event | Final | | | | | |
| Athlete | Event | Hoop | Ball | Clubs | Ribbon | Total | Rank |
|---|---|---|---|---|---|---|---|
| Grace Legote; Aimee van Rooyen; Julene van Rooyen | Team | 36.725 | 38.400 | 36.450 | 36.800 | 125.850 | 6 |

Individual

| Athlete | Event | Qualification | | | | | | Final | | | | | |
| Athlete | Event | Hoop | Ball | Clubs | Ribbon | Total | Rank | Hoop | Ball | Clubs | Ribbon | Total | Rank |
|---|---|---|---|---|---|---|---|---|---|---|---|---|---|
| Grace Legote | Individual | 13.400 | 13.500 | 14.000 | 13.900 | 54.800 | 9 Q | 13.700 | 13.100 | 10.750 | 13.850 | 51.400 | 10 |
| Aimee van Rooyen | Individual | 10.875 | 11.850 | 12.100 | 12.200 | 47.025 | 17 Q | 11.450 | 11.750 | 12.000 | 10.625 | 45.825 | 15 |
| Julene van Rooyen | Individual | 11.550 | 10.750 | 11.550 | 11.800 | 45.650 | 22 | Did not advance | | | | | |

Individual finals

| Athlete | Event | Total | Rank |
|---|---|---|---|
| Grace Legote | Clubs | 14.050 | 5 |
| Grace Legote | Ribbon | 13.100 | 7 |

== Judo ==
Men

| Athlete | Event | Round of 32 | Round of 16 | Quarterfinals | Semifinals | Repechage | Final / BM | |
| Athlete | Event | Opposition Result | Opposition Result | Opposition Result | Opposition Result | Opposition Result | Opposition Result | Rank |
|---|---|---|---|---|---|---|---|---|
| Daniel Le Grange | −60 kg | —N/a | Magogo (TAN); W w/o | Abugiri (GHA); W 0000-0002 | Chana (IND); L 0001-1000 | Bye | Buchanan (SCO); L 0001-1001 | 5 |
| James Millar | −66 kg | Bye | Macdonald (WAL); W 1000–0001 | Luzia (MOZ); W 1100-0002 | Krassas (CYP); L 0003-0013 | Bye | Nandal (IND); W 0002-0003 | 3rd place, bronze medalist(s) |
| Jacques van Zyl | −73 kg | Bye | Vui (PNG); W 1010–0001 | Dawson (SCO); W 1001-0001 | Leat (NZL); L 0001-1100 | Bye | Fleming (NIR); W 1010-0002 | 3rd place, bronze medalist(s) |
| Zack Piontek | −90 kg | —N/a | Plevin (GUE); W 1010-0000 | Burns (SCO); W 1011-0001 | Dill-Russell (NZL); W 1002–0001 | Bye | Purssey (SCO); W 0010-0000 | 1st place, gold medalist(s) |
| Ruan Snyman | +100 kg | —N/a | Bye | Rygielski (CAN); W 0001-0002 | Andrewartha (AUS); W 1000-0002 | Bye | Sherrington (SCO); L 0001-1000 | 2nd place, silver medalist(s) |

Women

| Athlete | Event | Round of 16 | Quarterfinal | Semifinal | Repechage | Final / BM | |
| Athlete | Event | Opposition Result | Opposition Result | Opposition Result | Opposition Result | Opposition Result | Rank |
|---|---|---|---|---|---|---|---|
| Sinothando Mva | −52 kg | Bye | Kearney (NIR); L0000-1000 | Did not advance | Legentil (MRI); L0001-1000 | Did not advance | |

== Lawn Bowls ==
Men

Women

== Netball ==
Pool B

| Team | Pld | W | L | PF | PA | PD | Pts | Qualification |
|---|---|---|---|---|---|---|---|---|
| Australia | 5 | 5 | 0 | 322 | 185 | +137 | 10 | Semi-finals |
| England | 5 | 4 | 1 | 293 | 160 | +133 | 8 | Semi-finals |
| South Africa | 5 | 3 | 2 | 249 | 222 | +27 | 6 | |
| Wales | 5 | 2 | 3 | 199 | 255 | −56 | 4 | |
| Trinidad and Tobago | 5 | 1 | 4 | 167 | 282 | −115 | 2 | |
| Barbados | 5 | 0 | 5 | 162 | 288 | −126 | 0 | |

Source: glasgow2014.com

25 July 2014
15:00

Report
South Africa
56 – 40
Trinidad and Tobago

SECC Precinct
Umpires:
Gary Burgess (ENG)
Rachael Ayre (AUS)
Reserve umpire:
Jonathan Bredin (NZL)
Bootha 8/10 (80%)
Holtzhausen 8/10 (80%)
Myburgh 14/20 (70%)
Potgieter 26/31 (84%)

Cooper 15/17 (88%)
McCollin 10/11 (91%)
Wilson 15/17 (88%)

26 July 2014
15:00

Report
South Africa
57 – 36
Barbados

SECC Precinct
Umpires:
Sharon Kelly (AUS)
Joshua Bowring (AUS)
Reserve umpire:
Rachael Ayre (AUS)
Bootha 20/25 (80%)
Holtzhausen 11/12 (92%)
Myburgh 9/12 (75%)
Potgieter 17/19 (89%)

Browne 23/27 (85%)
Piggott 11/20 (55%)
Thomas 2/3 (67%)

27 July 2014
17:00

Report
England
41 – 35
South Africa

SECC Precinct
Umpires:
Rachael Ayre (AUS)
Terrence Peart (JAM)
Reserve umpire:
Yvonne Morgan (NZL)
Corbin 5/10 (50%)
Dunn 16/18 (89%)
Harten 20/29 (69%)

Bootha 27/32 (84%)
Holtzhausen 8/15 (53%)
Myburgh 2/3 (67%)

29 July 2014
17:00

Report
South Africa
61 – 41
Wales

SECC Precinct
Umpires:
Sharon Kelly (AUS)
Ian Fuller (ENG)
Reserve umpire:
Tracy Smith (ENG)
Holtzhausen 5/8 (63%)
Myburgh 8/13 (62%)
Potgieter 48/54 (89%)

James 16/24 (67%)
Lewis 16/24 (67%)
Moseley 3/5 (60%)
Thomas 6/7 (86%)

30 July 2014
09:30

Report
Australia
64 – 40
South Africa

SECC Precinct
Umpires:
Jonathan Bredin (NZL)
Ian Fuller (ENG)
Reserve umpire:
Gary Burgess (ENG)
Bassett 30/33 (91%)
Caldwell 7/10 (70%)
Medhurst 21/23 (91%)
Thwaits 6/6 (100%)

Bootha 4/8 (50%)
Holtzhausen 8/8 (100%)
Myburgh 2/3 (67%)
Potgieter 26/29 (90%)

== Rugby sevens ==
South Africa has qualified a rugby sevens team.

| Team | Pld | W | D | L | PF | PA | PD | Pts | Qualification |
|---|---|---|---|---|---|---|---|---|---|
| South Africa | 3 | 3 | 0 | 0 | 106 | 0 | +106 | 9 | Medal competition |
| Kenya | 3 | 2 | 0 | 1 | 63 | 25 | +38 | 7 | Medal competition |
| Cook Islands | 3 | 1 | 0 | 2 | 33 | 88 | −55 | 5 | Bowl competition |
| Trinidad and Tobago | 3 | 0 | 0 | 3 | 15 | 104 | −89 | 3 | Bowl competition |

26 July 2014
12:22

| South Africa | 36–0 | Trinidad and Tobago |
| | Report |

Ibrox Stadium, Glasgow

26 July 2014
19:30

| South Africa | 50–0 | Cook Islands |
| | Report |

Ibrox Stadium, Glasgow

26 July 2014
22:10

| South Africa | 20–0 | Kenya |
| | Report |

Ibrox Stadium, Glasgow

Quarter final

27 July 2014
13:12

| South Africa | 35–12 | Scotland |
| | Report |

Ibrox Stadium, Glasgow

Semi-final

27 July 2014
19:06

| Samoa | 7–35 | South Africa |
| | Report |

Ibrox Stadium, Glasgow

Gold medal match

27 July 2014
21:37

| New Zealand | 12–17 | South Africa |
| | Report |

Ibrox Stadium, Glasgow, Scotland

== Swimming ==
Men

| Athlete | Event | Heat | | Semifinal | | Final | |
| Athlete | Event | Time | Rank | Time | Rank | Time | Rank |
|---|---|---|---|---|---|---|---|
| Roland Schoeman | 50 m freestyle | 22.54 | =6 Q | 22.26 | 6 Q | 22.36 | 6 |
| Bradley Tandy | 50 m freestyle | 22.78 | 10 Q | 22.34 | 7 Q | 22.43 | 7 |
| Clayton Jimmie | 100 m freestyle | 50.69 | =14 Q | 50.50 | 13 | Did not advance | |
| Caydon Muller | 100 m freestyle | 51.27 | 19 | Did not advance | | | |
| Leith Shankland | 100 m freestyle | 49.64 | 4 Q | 49.35 | 4 Q | 49.81 | 7 |
| Calvyn Justus | 200 m freestyle | 1:50.73 | 17 | —N/a | | Did not advance | |
| Craig Groenewald | 200 m freestyle S14 | 2:06.74 | 7 Q | —N/a | | 2:07.91 | 7 |
| Devon Brown | 400 m freestyle | 3:48.65 | 9 | —N/a | | Did not advance | |
| Devon Brown | 1500 m freestyle | 15:10.87 | 5 Q | —N/a | | 15:17.89 | 8 |
| Darren Murray | 100 m backstroke | 55.78 | 12 Q | 55.68 | 12 | Did not advance | |
| Darren Murray | 200 m backstroke | 2:01.48 | 9 | Did not advance | | | |
| Bradley Tandy | 50 m breaststroke | 28.57 | 12 Q | DSQ | | Did not advance | |
| Cameron van der Burgh | 50 m breaststroke | 27.39 | 2 Q | 26.80 | 1 Q | 26.76 | 1st place, gold medalist(s) |
| Cameron van der Burgh | 100 m breaststroke | 1:00.99 | 4 Q | 59.91 | 3 Q | 59.28 | 2nd place, silver medalist(s) |
| Chad le Clos | 50 m butterfly | 23.65 | 3 Q | 23.29 | 3 Q | 23.36 | 3rd place, bronze medalist(s) |
| Roland Schoeman | 50 m butterfly | 23.85 | 6 Q | 23.25 | 2 Q | 23.13 | 2nd place, silver medalist(s) |
| Chad le Clos | 100 m butterfly | 52.68 | 1 Q | 52.12 | 2 Q | 51.29 GR | 1st place, gold medalist(s) |
| Dylan Bosch | 200 m butterfly | 1:58.95 | 9 | —N/a | | did not advance | |
| Chad le Clos | 200 m butterfly | 1:57.45 | 2 Q | —N/a | | 1:55.07 GR | 1st place, gold medalist(s) |
| Sebastien Rousseau | 200 m butterfly | 1:57.84 | 3 Q | —N/a | | 1:56.43 | 3rd place, bronze medalist(s) |
| Dylan Bosch | 200 metre individual medley | 2:04.03 | 13 | —N/a | | did not advance | |
| Chad le Clos | 200 metre individual medley | 2:00.78 | 7 Q | —N/a | | 1:58.85 | 3rd place, bronze medalist(s) |
| Sebastien Rousseau | 200 metre individual medley | 1:59.61 | 3 Q | —N/a | | 2:01.61 | 8 |
| Sebastien Rousseau | 400 m individual medley | 4:16.02 | 6 Q | —N/a | | 4:13.09 | 3rd place, bronze medalist(s) |
| Clayton Jimmie; Calvyn Justus*; Chad le Clos; Caydon Muller; Roland Schoeman; Leith Shankland* | 4 × 100 m freestyle relay | 3:19.97 | 4 Q | —N/a | | 3:15.17 | 2nd place, silver medalist(s) |
| Dylan Bosch; Devon Brown; Calvyn Justus*; Chad le Clos; Sebastien Rousseau | 4 × 200 m freestyle relay | 7:16.44 | 2 Q | —N/a | | 7:10.36 | 3rd place, bronze medalist(s) |
| Dylan Bosch*; Clayton Jimmie*; Chad le Clos; Sebastien Rousseau; Leith Shankland; Cameron van der Burgh | 4 × 100 m medley relay | 3:40.31 | 5 Q | —N/a | | 3:34.47 | 3rd place, bronze medalist(s) |

Women

| Athlete | Event | Heat | | Semifinal | | Final | |
| Athlete | Event | Time | Rank | Time | Rank | Time | Rank |
|---|---|---|---|---|---|---|---|
| Trudi Maree | 50 m freestyle | 25.80 | 12 Q | 25.60 | 11 | Did not advance | |
| Erin Gallagher | 100 m freestyle | 56.53 | =13 Q | 55.86 | 10 | Did not advance | |
| Trudi Maree | 100 m freestyle | 57.20 | 15 Q | 56.53 | 14 | Did not advance | |
| Karin Prinsloo | 100 m freestyle | Did not start | | Did not advance | | | |
| Karin Prinsloo | 200 m freestyle | 1:58.38 | 6 Q | —N/a | | 1:58.95 | 8 |
| Jessica Ashley-Cooper | 100 m backstroke | 1:03.61 | 13 Q | 1:03.07 | 13 | Did not advance | |
| Tara-Lynn Nicholas | 50 m breaststroke | 31.48 | 9 Q | 32.32 | 12 | Did not advance | |
| Tara-Lynn Nicholas | 100 m breaststroke | 1:10.15 | 12 Q | 1:09.11 | 10 | Did not advance | |
| Marne Erasmus | 50 m butterfly | 27.40 | 15 Q | 27.45 | 14 | Did not advance | |
| Trudi Maree | 50 m butterfly | 27.62 | 16 Q | 27.64 | 16 | Did not advance | |
| Marne Erasmus | 100 m butterfly | 1:01.81 | 14 Q | 1:00.72 | 14 | Did not advance | |
| Rene Warnes | 200 m butterfly | 2:14.85 | 13 | —N/a | | Did not advance | |
| Marlies Ross | 200 m individual medley | 2:15.17 | 9 | —N/a | | Did not advance | |
| Rene Warnes | 200 m individual medley | 2:19.56 | 14 | —N/a | | Did not advance | |
| Rene Warnes | 400 m individual medley | 4:49.81 | 9 | —N/a | | Did not advance | |
| Erin Gallagher; Trudi Maree; Karin Prinsloo; Marlies Ross | 4 × 100 m freestyle relay | DSQ | | —N/a | | Did not advance | |
| Erin Gallagher; Karin Prinsloo; Marlies Ross; Rene Warnes | 4 × 200 m freestyle relay | 8:14.19 | 7 Q | —N/a | | 8:08.12 | 6 |
| Jessica Ashley-Cooper*; Marne Erasmus; Erin Gallagher; Tara-Lynn Nicholas; Karin Prinsloo; Marlies Ross* | 4 × 100 m medley relay | 4:11.34 | 6 | —N/a | | 4:09.31 | 5 |

Qualifiers for the latter rounds (Q) of all events were decided on a time only basis, therefore positions shown are overall results versus competitors in all heats.
* – Indicates athlete swam in the preliminaries but not in the final race.

== Triathlon ==
| Athlete | Event | Swim (1.5 km) | Bike (40 km) | Run (10 km) | Total Time | Rank |
|---|---|---|---|---|---|---|
| Richard Murray | Men's | 18:45 | 59:09 | 31:35 | 1:50:21 | 3rd place, bronze medalist(s) |
| Henri Schoeman | Men's | 17:54 | 59:57 | 34:51 | 1:53:46 | 16 |
| Wian Sullwald | Men's | 18:42 | 1:00:17 | 33:47 | 1:53:43 | 15 |
| Kate Roberts | Women's | 19:49 | 1:11:48 | 39:04 | 2:11:45 | 14 |
| Gillian Sanders | Women's | 20:59 | 1:10:41 | 38:19 | 2:11:01 | 13 |

Mixed Team

| Athletes | Event | Total Times per Athlete (Swim 250 m, Bike 6 km, Run 1.6 km) | Total Group Time | Rank |
|---|---|---|---|---|
| Kate Roberts; Henri Schoeman; Gillian Sanders; Richard Murray | Mixed relay | 19:24; 17:29; 19:18; 18:02 | 1:14:13 | 2nd place, silver medalist(s) |

== Weightlifting ==
Men

| Athlete | Event | Snatch | Clean & jerk | Total | Rank |
|---|---|---|---|---|---|
| Anrich Phillpis | 56 kg | 103 | 135 | 238 | 5 |
| Greg Shushu | 62 kg | Did not finish | | | |
| Gordon Shaw | +105 kg | 160 | 190 | 350 | 5 |

Women

| Athlete | Event | Snatch | Clean & jerk | Total | Rank |
|---|---|---|---|---|---|
| Portia Vries | 48 kg | 66 | Did not finish | | |
| Mona Pretorius | 63 kg | 82 | Did not finish | | |

Powerlifting

| Athlete | Event | Total | Rank |
|---|---|---|---|
| Juanita Stierman | Women's 61 kg | 82.4 | 4 |

== Wrestling ==
Men
| Athlete | Event | Round of 32 | Round of 16 | Quarterfinal | Semifinal | Repechage | Final / BM | |
| Athlete | Event | Opposition Result | Opposition Result | Opposition Result | Opposition Result | Opposition Result | Opposition Result | Rank |
|---|---|---|---|---|---|---|---|---|
| Bokang Masunyane | −57 kg | —N/a | Bye | Amit Kumar (IND); L 0-10 | Did not advance | Bandoo (MRI); W 12-1 | Hussain (PAK); L 1-11 | 5 |
| Marno Plaatjies | −61 kg | —N/a | Fernando (SRI); W 10-0 | Kumar (IND); L 1-12 | Did not advance | Madyarchyk (ENG); L 10-14 | Did not advance | 7 |
| Terry van Rensburg | −65 kg | —N/a | Munene (KEN); W 10-0 | Tarash (AUS); W 4-2 | Balfour (CAN); L 9-10 | —N/a | Clarkson (NGR); L 0-8 | 5 |
| Gerald Meyer | −74 kg | Bye | Mackey (BAH); W 10-0 | Grundy (ENG); L 0-10 | Did not advance | | | |
| Armando Hietbrink | −86 kg | —N/a | Cole (WAL); W 11-0 | Waddell (SCO); W 11-0 | Dick (NGR); L 0-10 | —N/a | Omenda (KEN); W 10-0 | 3rd place, bronze medalist(s) |
| Adem Digovich | −125 kg | —N/a | Anwar (PAK); L 1-12 | Did not advance | | | | |

Women
| Athlete | Event | Round of 16 | Quarterfinal | Semifinal | Repechage | Final / BM | |
| Athlete | Event | Opposition Result | Opposition Result | Opposition Result | Opposition Result | Opposition Result | Rank |
|---|---|---|---|---|---|---|---|
| Mpho Madi | −53 kg | —N/a | Sehrawat (IND); L 0-10 | Did not advance | —N/a | Hawke (SCO); W 4-0 | 3rd place, bronze medalist(s) |
| Jeanne-Marie Coetzer | −55 kg | —N/a | Nwoye (NGR); L 2-13 | Did not advance | | | |
| Norma Gordon | −58 kg | Grundy (ENG); L 6-8 | Did not advance | | | | |
| Zumicke Geringer | −63 kg | Metala Epanga (CMR); L 2-12 | Did not advance | | | | |
| Refilwe Molongwana | −69 kg | —N/a | Mbogo (KEN); W 4-0 | Tomo (CMR); L 0-8 | —N/a | Rueben (NGR); L 2-12 | 5 |
