= Cameroon at the 2014 Commonwealth Games =

- CG code: CMR
- CGA: National Olympic and Sports Committee of Cameroon
- Website: cnosc.com (in French)

in Glasgow, Scotland
- Competitors: 62
- Flag bearer: Vanetius Njuh
- Medals Ranked 17th: Gold 1 Silver 3 Bronze 3 Total 7

Commonwealth Games appearances (overview)
- 1998; 2002; 2006; 2010; 2014; 2018; 2022; 2026; 2030

Cameroon competed in the 2014 Commonwealth Games in Glasgow, Scotland from 23 July – 3 August 2014.

== Medalists ==
Medal	Name	Sport	Event	Date
Gold	Marie Fegue	Weightlifting	Women's 69 kg	July 28
Silver	Helene Wezeu Dombeu	Judo	Women's 63 kg	July 24
Silver	Annabel Ali	Wrestling	Women's freestyle 75 kg	July 29
Silver	Angele Tomo	Wrestling	Women's freestyle 69 kg	July 30
Bronze	Hortense Mballa Atanga	Judo	Women's 78 kg	July 26
Bronze	Rebecca Muambo	Wrestling	Women's freestyle 48 kg	July 29
Bronze	Blandine Metala Epanga	Wrestling	Women's freestyle 63 kg	July 31

== Athletics ==
Men

Athlete	Event	Round 1		Semifinal		Final	
Athlete	Event	Result	Rank	Result	Rank	Result	Rank
Idrissa Adam	100 m	did not start					
Alphonse Binam Nlend	100 m	11.34	7	did not advance			
Idrissa Adam	200 m	did not start					

Athlete	Event	Qualification		Final	
Athlete	Event	Distance	Rank	Distance	Rank
Gervais Mpazambe	Long jump	7.26	19	did not advance	
Gervais Mpazambe	Triple jump	14.93	18	did not advance	
Fernand Djoumessi Temfack	High jump	2.20	=7 Q	2.21	7

Women

Athlete	Event	Round 1		Semifinal		Final	
Athlete	Event	Result	Rank	Result	Rank	Result	Rank
Irene Bell Bonong	100 m	12.67	8	did not advance			

Athlete	Event	Qualification		Final	
Athlete	Event	Distance	Position	Distance	Position
Marlyne Ngo Ngoa	Long jump	6.52 PB	3 Q	6.20	10
Marie Ngona Zibi	Long jump	did not start		did not advance	
Joëlle Mbumi Nkouindjin	Long jump	6.30	10 q	6.18	11
Marie Ngono Zibi	Triple jump	12.23	18	did not advance	
Joelle Mbumi Nkouindjin	Triple jump	13.40 PB	5 Q	13.48 PB	7
Auriol Dongmo Mekemnang	Shot put	—N/a		16.50 NR	7
Auriol Dongmo Mekemnang	Discus throw	did not start		did not advance	

Combined events – Heptathlon

Athlete	Event	100H	HJ	SP	200 m	LJ	JT	800 m	Final	Rank
Anny Oyono	Result	16.88	1.54	11.03	26.61	4.99	20.68	2:40.1	4048	10
Anny Oyono	Points	610	666	597	745	557	302	571	4048	10

== Judo ==
Men

Athlete	Event	Round of 32	Round of 16	Quarterfinals	Semifinals	Repechage	Final / BM	
Athlete	Event	Opposition Result	Opposition Result	Opposition Result	Opposition Result	Opposition Result	Opposition Result	Rank
Bernadin Tsala Tsala	−60 kg	—N/a	Agudoo (GHA); L 0003–0002	did not advance				
Dieudonne Nama Etoga	−66 kg	Magagula (SWZ); W 1000–0000	Bouchard (CAN); W 1002–0000	Millar (SCO); L 0002-0012	Did not advance	Nandal (IND); L 0002-1003	Did not advance	7
Joseph Hell Bapou	−73 kg	Dawson (SCO); L 000–101	did not advance					
Louis Messi	−81 kg	Bye	Alhassan (GHA); W 1010–0001	Burt (CAN); L 0003-1110	Did not advance	Munyonga (ZAM); L 0004-1003	Did not advance	7
Eric Jean Omgba Fouda	−81 kg	Vikender Singh (IND); W 1101–0001	Reed (ENG); L 0000–1010	did not advance				
Dieudonne Dolassem	−90 kg	—N/a	Burns (SCO); L 0003-1101	did not advance				
Stephane Ombiongno	−90 kg	—N/a	Ahiavor (GHA); W 1001–0004	Purssey (SCO); L 0004-1002	Did not advance	Hall (ENG); L 0013-1000	Did not advance	7

Women

Athlete	Event	Round of 16	Quarterfinal	Semifinal	Repechage	Final / BM	
Athlete	Event	Opposition Result	Opposition Result	Opposition Result	Opposition Result	Opposition Result	Rank
Marie Medza Effa	−48 kg	Likmabam (IND); L1010-0001	did not advance				
Marcelle Monabang	−48 kg	Bye	Renicks (SCO); L0001-1000	did not advance	Kavanagh (NZL); W1011-0001	Rayner (AUS); L0000-0010	5
Paul Sitcheping	−57 kg	Bye	Sylva (MRI); W1000-0001	Inglis (SCO); L0003-0002	Bye	Ramsay (SCO); L1011-0000	5
Bibiene Fopa	−63 kg	Choudhary (IND); L 0002-0001	did not advance				
Helene Wezeu Dombeu	−63 kg	Bye	Bezzina (MLT); W 0000-0003	Valois Fortier (CAN); W 0103-0000	Bye	Clark (SCO); L 0000-1000	2nd place, silver medalist(s)
Fabiola Ndanga Nana	−70 kg	Renaud-Roy (CAN); L 0001-0000	did not advance				
Hortense Mballa Atanga	−78 kg	Bye	Muragu (KEN); W 1010-0001	Gibbons (ENG); L 0000-1000	Bye	Chongtham (IND); W 101-000	3rd place, bronze medalist(s)

== Weightlifting ==
Men

Athlete	Event	Snatch	Clean & Jerk	Total	Rank
Paul Ndicka Matam	56 kg	82	110	192	9
Daniel Koum	62 kg	112	145	257	8
Joseph Ekani Belinga	69 kg	130	150	280	9
Njuh Venatius	69 kg	125	160	285	7
Guy Ngongang Tchuissi	77 kg	132	167	299	7
Jean Yanou Ketchanke	77 kg	141	did not finish		
Cyrille Tchatchet II	85 kg	140	175	315	5
Petit Minkoumba	94 kg	143	177	320	7

Women

Athlete	Event	Snatch	Clean & Jerk	Total	Rank
Ndoua Epie Osoungou	58 kg	70	90	160	12
Arcangeline Fouodji Sonkbou	63 kg	77	100	177	8
Myriam Ghekap Wafo	63 kg	82	108	190	6
Marie Fegue	69 kg	102	132	234	1st place, gold medalist(s)
Clementine Meukeugni Noumbissi	+75 kg	86	107	193	10
Albertine Um	+75 kg	77	108	185	11

Powerlifting

Athlete	Event	Total	Rank
Julien Sodjine Motto	Men's 72 kg	148	8
Maurice Francis Biwole Nkodo	Men's +72 kg	162.6	7
Mimozette Nghamsi Fotie	Women's 61 kg	74.4	5

== Wrestling ==
Men's freestyle

Athlete	Event	Round of 32	Round of 16	Quarterfinal	Semifinal	Repechage 1	Repechage 2	Final / BM	
Athlete	Event	Opposition Result	Opposition Result	Opposition Result	Opposition Result	Opposition Result	Opposition Result	Opposition Result	Rank
Arnaud Essindi Sengui	−61 kg	—N/a	Kariuki (KEN); W 14-2	Tremblay (CAN); L 1-4	Did not advance	Vella (MLT); L 4–1	did not advance		7
Romeo Djoumessi	−74 kg	Bye	Grundy (ENG); L 0-10	did not advance					
Elie Zamdam	−86 kg	—N/a	Bianco (SCO); L 3-8	did not advance					
Claude Mbianga	−125 kg	—N/a	Xxx (ENG); L 5–14	did not advance					

Women's freestyle

Athlete	Event	Round of 16	Quarterfinal	Semifinal	Repechage	Final / BM	
Athlete	Event	Opposition Result	Opposition Result	Opposition Result	Opposition Result	Opposition Result	Rank
Rebecca Muambo	−48 kg	—N/a	Robertson (SCO); W 4–0	Ratigan (ENG); L 0-4	—N/a	Robertson (SCO); W 10-0	3rd place, bronze medalist(s)
Lemofack Letchidji	−53 kg	—N/a	Kaur (AUS); W 8–3	Adekuoroye (NGR); L 0–10	—N/a	Gallays (CAN); L 0–5	5
Joseph Essombe Tiako	−55 kg	—N/a	Laverdure (CAN); L 0-4	Did not advance	—N/a	Maliki (IND); L 0–10	5
Blandine Metala Epanga	−63 kg	—N/a	Geringer (RSA); W 12–2	Jakhar (IND); L 2-8	—N/a	Connolly (WAL); W 11-0	3rd place, bronze medalist(s)
Angele Tomo	−69 kg	—N/a	Rueben (NGR); W 18-9	Molongwana (RSA); W 8-0	—N/a	Yeats (CAN); L 0–4	2nd place, silver medalist(s)

Athlete	Event	Nordic 1	Nordic 2	Nordic 3	Nordic 4	Standings
Athlete	Event	Opposition Result	Opposition Result	Opposition Result	Opposition Result	Rank
Annabelle Ali	−75 kg	Edwards (ENG); W 10–0	Onyebuchi (NGR); W 10–1	Wiebe (CAN); L 4–2	Jyoti (IND); W 6–0	2nd place, silver medalist(s)
