= Wrestling at the 2014 Commonwealth Games =

- Venue: Scottish Exhibition and Conference Centre
- Location: Glasgow, Scotland
- Dates: 29 to 31 July 2014
- Competitors: 131 from 22 nations

Wrestling at the 2014 Commonwealth Games was the 17th appearance of Wrestling at the Commonwealth Games. The wrestling competition at the 2014 Commonwealth Games was held in Glasgow, Scotland, between 29 July and 31 July at the Scottish Exhibition and Conference Centre. Greco-Roman wrestling was dropped from the program.

== Medal table ==
Rank	Nation	Gold	Silver	Bronze	Total
1	Canada	7	2	3	12
2	India	5	6	2	13
3	Nigeria	2	2	8	12
4	Cameroon	0	2	2	4
5	England	0	1	4	5
6	Pakistan	0	1	1	2
7	New Zealand	0	0	2	2
7	Scotland	0	0	2	2
7	South Africa	0	0	2	2
10	Wales	0	0	1	1
Totals (10 entries)		14	14	27	55

=== Men's freestyle ===
Event	Gold	Silver	Bronze
57 kg	Amit Kumar; India	Ebikewenimo Welson; Nigeria	Azhar Hussain; Pakistan
57 kg	Amit Kumar; India	Ebikewenimo Welson; Nigeria	Craig Pilling; Wales
61 kg	David Tremblay; Canada	Bajrang Punia; India	Viorel Etko; Scotland
61 kg	David Tremblay; Canada	Bajrang Punia; India	Amas Daniel; Nigeria
65 kg	Yogeshwar Dutt; India	Jevon Balfour; Canada	Sampson Clarkson; Nigeria
65 kg	Yogeshwar Dutt; India	Jevon Balfour; Canada	Alex Gladkov; Scotland
74 kg	Sushil Kumar; India	Qamar Abbas; Pakistan	Mike Grundy; England
74 kg	Sushil Kumar; India	Qamar Abbas; Pakistan	Melvin Bibo; Nigeria
86 kg	Tamerlan Tagziev; Canada	Andrew Dick; Nigeria	Armando Hietbrink; South Africa
86 kg	Tamerlan Tagziev; Canada	Andrew Dick; Nigeria	Pawan Kumar; India
97 kg	Arjun Gill; Canada	Satyawart Kadian; India	Sam Belkin; New Zealand
97 kg	Arjun Gill; Canada	Satyawart Kadian; India	Leon Rattigan; England
125 kg	Korey Jarvis; Canada	Rajeev Tomar; India	Chinu Singh; England
125 kg	Korey Jarvis; Canada	Rajeev Tomar; India	Sinivie Boltic; Nigeria

=== Women's freestyle ===
Event	Gold	Silver	Bronze
48 kg	Vinesh Phogat; India	Yana Rattigan; England	Jasmine Mian; Canada
48 kg	Vinesh Phogat; India	Yana Rattigan; England	Rebecca Muambo; Cameroon
53 kg	Odunayo Adekuoroye; Nigeria	Lalita Sehrawat; India	Jill Gallays; Canada
53 kg	Odunayo Adekuoroye; Nigeria	Lalita Sehrawat; India	Mpho Madi; South Africa
55 kg	Babita Kumari; India	Brittanee Laverdure; Canada	Ifeoma Nwoye; Nigeria
55 kg	Babita Kumari; India	Brittanee Laverdure; Canada	Louisa Porogovska; England
58 kg	Aminat Adeniyi; Nigeria	Sakshi Malik; India	Braxton Stone-Papadopoulos; Canada
58 kg	Aminat Adeniyi; Nigeria	Sakshi Malik; India	Tayla Ford; New Zealand
63 kg	Danielle Lappage; Canada	Geetika Jakhar; India	Blessing Oborududu; Nigeria
63 kg	Danielle Lappage; Canada	Geetika Jakhar; India	Blandine Metala Epanga; Cameroon
69 kg	Dorothy Yeats; Canada	Angele Tomo; Cameroon	Navjot Kaur; India
69 kg	Dorothy Yeats; Canada	Angele Tomo; Cameroon	Hannah Rueben; Nigeria
75 kg	Erica Wiebe; Canada	Annabelle Ali; Cameroon	Blessing Onyebuchi; Nigeria
75 kg	Erica Wiebe; Canada	Annabelle Ali; Cameroon	Not awarded

* Only one bronze was awarded in the women's 75 kg event as only five wrestlers competed.

== Schedule ==
All times are British Summer Time (UTC+1). All event times are subject to change.

Date	Time	Event
Tuesday 29 July	10:00–12:30	Men's 55 kg, 74 kg & 120 kg preliminaries; quarterfinals; semifinals; repechage
Tuesday 29 July	10:00–12:30	Women's 48 kg & 72 kg preliminaries; quarterfinals; semifinals; repechage
Tuesday 29 July	16:30–18:30	Men's 55 kg, 74 kg & 120 kg bronze & gold
Tuesday 29 July	16:30–18:30	Women's 48 kg & 72 kg bronze & gold
Wednesday 30 July	10:00–12:30	Men's 60 kg, 96 kg preliminaries; quarterfinals; semifinals; repechage
Wednesday 30 July	10:00–12:30	Women's 51 kg, 59 kg & 67 kg preliminaries; quarterfinals; semifinals; repechage
Wednesday 30 July	16:30–18:30	Men's 60 kg & 96 kg bronze & gold
Wednesday 30 July	16:30–18:30	Women's 51 kg, 59 kg & 67 kg bronze & gold
Thursday 31 July	10:00–12:30	Men's 66 kg, 84 kg preliminaries; quarterfinals; semifinals; repechage
Thursday 31 July	10:00–12:30	Women's 55 kg 63 kg preliminaries; quarterfinals; semifinals; repechage
Thursday 31 July	16:30–18:30	Men's 66 kg & 84 kg bronze & gold
Thursday 31 July	16:30–18:30	Women's 55 kg 63 kg bronze & gold

== Participating nations ==
- Australia (8)
- Bahamas (1)
- Bangladesh (2)
- Cameroon (11)
- Canada (14)
- England (13)
- India (14)
- Kenya (6)
- Kiribati (3)
- Malta (2)
- Mauritius (3)
- Namibia (1)
- New Zealand (6)
- Nigeria (14)
- Northern Ireland (2)
- Pakistan (7)
- Scotland (12)
- Sierra Leone (2)
- Solomon Islands (1)
- South Africa (11)
- Sri Lanka (7)
- Wales (5)
