= Swimming at the 2014 Commonwealth Games – Men's 200 metre individual medley =

Men's 200 metre individual medley at the 2014 Commonwealth Games
- Venue: Tollcross International Swimming Centre
- Dates: 29 July 2014
- Competitors: 25 from 16 nations
- Winning time: 1:57.83 GR

Medalists
gold medal	Daniel Tranter	Australia
silver medal	Daniel Wallace	Scotland
bronze medal	Chad le Clos	South Africa

The men's 200 metre individual medley event at the 2014 Commonwealth Games as part of the swimming programme took place on 29 July at the Tollcross International Swimming Centre in Glasgow, Scotland.

The medals were presented by David Wilkie, the 1974 Commonwealth champion in this event and the quaichs were presented by Dr. Bridget McConnell, Board member of Glasgow 2014.

== Records ==
Prior to this competition, the existing world and Commonwealth Games records were as follows.

World record	Ryan Lochte (USA)	1:54.00	Shanghai, China	28 July 2011
Commonwealth record	Leith Brodie (AUS)	1:56.69	Rome, Italy	30 July 2009
Games record	James Goddard (ENG)	1:58.10	Delhi, India	8 October 2010

The following records were established during the competition:

Date	Event	Name	Nationality	Time	Record
29 July	Final	Daniel Tranter	Australia	1:57.83	GR

== Results ==
=== Heats ===
Rank	Heat	Lane	Name	Nationality	Time	Notes
1	4	4	Daniel Tranter	Australia	1:59.05	Q
2	2	5	Daniel Wallace	Scotland	1:59.36	Q
3	4	6	Sebastien Rousseau	South Africa	1:59.61	Q
4	4	5	Roberto Pavoni	England	1:59.79	Q
5	4	3	Joseph Roebuck	England	2:00.46	Q
6	3	5	Ieuan Lloyd	Wales	2:00.73	Q
7	2	4	Chad le Clos	South Africa	2:00.78	Q
8	3	4	Thomas Fraser-Holmes	Australia	2:00.97	Q
9	3	6	Evan White	Canada	2:01.28	
10	3	2	Mitchell Donaldson	New Zealand	2:01.32	
11	2	2	Xavier Mohammed	Wales	2:01.47	
12	4	7	Luke Reilly	Canada	2:03.10	
13	3	3	Dylan Bosch	South Africa	2:04.03	
14	2	6	Lewis Coleman	England	2:04.63	
15	4	2	Joseph Schooling	Singapore	2:07.04	
16	3	7	Thomas Hollingsworth	Guernsey	2:08.35	
17	4	1	Luke Belton	Guernsey	2:13.54	
18	2	7	Colin Bensadon	Gibraltar	2:13.74	
19	3	1	Ralph Goveia	Zambia	2:13.90	
20	2	1	Alexandros Axiotis	Zambia	2:14.58	
21	4	8	Brandon Schuster	Samoa	2:18.49	
22	1	5	Igor Mogne	Mozambique	2:18.89	
23	1	3	Stanford Kawale	Papua New Guinea	2:24.57	
24	1	4	Nisar Ahmed	Pakistan	2:25.69	
	2	3	Mitch Larkin	Australia		DNS

=== Final ===
Rank	Lane	Name	Nationality	Time	Notes
1st place, gold medalist(s)	4	Daniel Tranter	Australia	1:57.83	GR
2nd place, silver medalist(s)	5	Daniel Wallace	Scotland	1:58.72	
3rd place, bronze medalist(s)	1	Chad le Clos	South Africa	1:58.85	
4	8	Thomas Fraser-Holmes	Australia	1:58.86	
5	6	Roberto Pavoni	England	1:59.30	
6	2	Joseph Roebuck	England	1:59.33	
7	7	Ieuan Lloyd	Wales	2:00.44	
8	3	Sebastien Rousseau	South Africa	2:01.61	
