= Swimming at the 2014 Commonwealth Games – Men's 200 metre butterfly =

Men's 200 metre butterfly at the 2014 Commonwealth Games
- Venue: Tollcross International Swimming Centre
- Dates: 26 July 2014
- Competitors: 15 from 8 nations
- Winning time: 1:55.07 GR

Medalists
gold medal	Chad le Clos	South Africa
silver medal	Grant Irvine	Australia
bronze medal	Sebastien Rousseau	South Africa

The men's 200 metre butterfly event at the 2014 Commonwealth Games as part of the swimming programme took place on 26 July at the Tollcross International Swimming Centre in Glasgow, Scotland.

The medals were presented by Kamalesh Sharma, Secretary-General of the Commonwealth of Nations and the quaichs were presented by James Hickman, 1998 Commonwealth champion and Global Sports Marketing Manager of Speedo.

== Records ==
Prior to this competition, the existing world and Commonwealth Games records were as follows.

World record	Michael Phelps (USA)	1:51.51	Rome, Italy	29 July 2009
Commonwealth record	Chad le Clos (RSA)	1:52.96	London, United Kingdom	31 July 2012
Games record	Chad le Clos (RSA)	1:56.48	Delhi, India	4 October 2010

The following records were established during the competition:

Date	Event	Name	Nationality	Time	Record
26 July	Final	Chad le Clos	South Africa	1:55.07	GR

== Results ==
=== Heats ===
Rank	Heat	Lane	Name	Nationality	Time	Notes
1	2	2	Cameron Brodie	Scotland	1:57.28	Q
2	2	4	Chad le Clos	South Africa	1:57.45	Q
3	1	4	Sebastien Rousseau	South Africa	1:57.84	Q
4	2	3	Mitchell Pratt	Australia	1:57.95	Q
5	2	7	Joseph Schooling	Singapore	1:58.04	Q
6	1	6	Daniel Tranter	Australia	1:58.30	Q
7	2	5	Grant Irvine	Australia	1:58.39	Q
8	2	6	Roberto Pavoni	England	1:58.49	Q
9	1	3	Dylan Bosch	South Africa	1:58.95	
10	1	5	Joseph Roebuck	England	1:59.14	
11	1	2	Lewis Smith	Scotland	1:59.25	
12	1	7	Evan White	Canada	2:00.96	
13	2	1	Gamal Assaad	Canada	2:02.60	
14	1	1	Dominic Walter	Jamaica	2:11.51	
15	2	8	Alex Bregazzi	Isle of Man	2:15.42	

=== Final ===
Rank	Lane	Name	Nationality	Time	Notes
1st place, gold medalist(s)	5	Chad le Clos	South Africa	1:55.07	GR
2nd place, silver medalist(s)	1	Grant Irvine	Australia	1:56.34	
3rd place, bronze medalist(s)	3	Sebastien Rousseau	South Africa	1:56.43	
4	4	Cameron Brodie	Scotland	1:56.59	
5	6	Mitchell Pratt	Australia	1:57.13	
6	7	Daniel Tranter	Australia	1:57.31	
7	8	Roberto Pavoni	England	1:58.03	
8	2	Joseph Schooling	Singapore	1:59.09	
