= Swimming at the 2014 Commonwealth Games – Men's 4 × 100 metre medley relay =

Men's 4 × 100 metre medley relay at the 2014 Commonwealth Games
- Venue: Tollcross International Swimming Centre
- Dates: 29 July 2014
- Competitors: 71 from 14 nations
- Winning time: 3:31.51 GR

Medalists
gold medal	Chris Walker-Hebborn; Adam Peaty; Adam Barrett; Adam Brown; Liam Tancock*; James Wilby*; James Guy*; James Disney-May*	England
silver medal	Mitch Larkin; Christian Sprenger; Jayden Hadler; James Magnussen; Joshua Beaver*; Kenneth To*; Tommaso D'Orsogna*; Cameron McEvoy*	Australia
bronze medal	Sebastien Rousseau; Cameron van der Burgh; Chad le Clos; Leith Shankland; Dylan Bosch*; Clayton Jimmie*	South Africa

The men's 4 × 100 metre medley relay event at the 2014 Commonwealth Games as part of the swimming programme took place on 29 July at the Tollcross International Swimming Centre in Glasgow, Scotland.

The medals were presented by David Leather, Chief Operations Officer of Glasgow 2014 and the quaichs were presented by Gordon Matheson, Leader of Glasgow City Council.

== Records ==
Prior to this competition, the existing world and Commonwealth Games records were as follows.

World record	United States (USA); Aaron Peirsol (52.19); Eric Shanteau (58.57); Michael Phelps (49.72); David Walters (46.80)	3:27.28	Rome, Italy	2 August 2009
Commonwealth record	Australia (AUS); Ashley Delaney (53.10); Brenton Rickard (57.80); Andrew Lauterstein (50.58); Matt Targett (47.16)	3:28.64	Rome, Italy	2 August 2009
Games record	Australia; Ashley Delaney (54.41); Brenton Rickard (59.59); Geoff Huegill (51.34); Eamon Sullivan (47.81)	3:33.15	Delhi, India	9 October 2010

The following records were established during the competition:

Date	Event	Nation	Swimmers	Time	Record
29 July	Final	England	Chris Walker-Hebborn (53.40); Adam Peaty (58.59); Adam Barrett (51.02); Adam Brown (48.50)	3:31.51	GR

== Results ==
=== Heats ===
Rank	Heat	Lane	Nation	Swimmers	Time	Notes
1	2	4	Australia	Joshua Beaver (54.34); Kenneth To (1:02.48); Tommaso D'Orsogna (52.17); Cameron McEvoy (48.37)	3:37.36	Q
2	1	4	Canada	Russell Wood (55.64); Richard Funk (1:00.03); Coleman Allen (52.69); Yuri Kisil (49.35)	3:37.71	Q
3	2	5	England	Liam Tancock (54.20); James Wilby (1:01.47); James Guy (52.72); James Disney-May (50:00)	3:38.39	Q
4	1	6	New Zealand	Corey Main (54.49); Glenn Snyders (59.82); Steven Kent (54.73); Matthew Stanley (50.35)	3:39.39	Q
5	2	2	South Africa	Sebastien Rousseau (55.92); Cameron van der Burgh (1:00.89); Dylan Bosch (53.65); Clayton Jimmie (49.85)	3:40.31	Q
6	1	7	Wales	Marco Loughran (55.56); Robert Holderness (1:01.09); Tom Laxton (53.94); Otto Putland (50.99)	3:41.58	Q
7	1	2	Scotland	Andrew McGovern (57.28); Craig Benson (1:00.64); Cameron Brodie (54.66); Jack Thorpe (49.43)	3:42.01	Q
8	2	6	Northern Ireland	Jordan Sloan (57.24); Michael Dawson (1:03.58); Curtis Coulter (56.30); David Thompson (50.71)	3:47.83	Q
9	2	7	Singapore	Quah Zheng Wen (56.41); Christopher Cheong (1:04.37); Joseph Schooling (55.34); Clement Lim (51.89)	3:48.01	
10	1	5	Guernsey	James Jurkiewicz (59.69); Luke Belton (1:05.87); Thomas Hollingsworth (57.54); Miles Munro (49.79)	3:52.89	
11	1	3	Malaysia	Tern Jian Han (58.17); Shaun Yap (1:06.74); Lim Ching Hwang (57.17); Welson Sim (51.82)	3:53.90	
12	2	3	Isle of Man	Grant Halsall (57.63); Guy Davies (1:06.66); Alex Bregazzi (1:00.57); Tom Bielich (53.80)	3:58.66	
13	2	1	Zambia	Milimo Mweetwa (1:08.70); Alexandros Axiotis (1:08.02); Ralph Goveia (57.69); Matthew Shone (57.69)	4:12.10	
14	1	1	Gibraltar	Jordan Gonzalez (1:05.48); Colin Bensadon (1:10.66); James Sanderson (1:00.42); Karl Pardo (58.30)	4:14.86	

=== Finals ===
Rank	Lane	Nation	Swimmers	Time	Notes
1st place, gold medalist(s)	3	England	Chris Walker-Hebborn (53.40); Adam Peaty (58.59); Adam Barrett (51.02); Adam Brown (48.50)	3:31.51	GR
2nd place, silver medalist(s)	4	Australia	Mitch Larkin (53.59); Christian Sprenger (59.64); Jayden Hadler (51.81); James Magnussen (47.17)	3:32.21	
3rd place, bronze medalist(s)	2	South Africa	Sebastien Rousseau (55.33); Cameron van der Burgh (59.40); Chad le Clos (51.05); Leith Shankland (48.69)	3:34.47	
4	5	Canada	Russell Wood (54.88); Richard Funk (1:00.41); Evan White (53.18); Yuri Kisil (48.14)	3:36.61	
5	6	New Zealand	Corey Main (54.35); Glenn Snyders (59.44); Steven Kent (53.45); Matthew Stanley (49.56)	3:36.80	
6	7	Wales	Marco Loughran (55.53); Robert Holderness (59.83); Tom Laxton (52.90); Calum Jarvis (48.99)	3:37.25	
7	1	Scotland	Ryan Bennett (55.05); Ross Murdoch (59.68); Cameron Brodie (53.31); Robert Renwick (49.44)	3:37.48	
8	8	Northern Ireland	Jordan Sloan (57.54); Michael Dawson (1:04.02); Curtis Coulter (58.27); David Thompson (51.56)	3:51.39	
