= Judo at the 2014 Commonwealth Games =

Judo competition

Judo Judo at the 2014 Commonwealth Games
- Venue: Scottish Exhibition and Conference Centre
- Location: Glasgow, Scotland
- Dates: 24 to 26 July 2014
- Competitors: 185 from 35 nations

Competition at external databases
- Links: JudoInside

Judo at the 2014 Commonwealth Games was the fourth appearance of that Judo at the Commonwealth Games. The judo competition at the 2014 Commonwealth Games was held in Glasgow, Scotland, from 24 July to 26 July at the Scottish Exhibition and Conference Centre.

Judo returned to the program after last being held at the 2002 Commonwealth Games.

England and home nation Scotland dominated the tournament, with six golds apiece, England leading the table on minor medals. Wales and South Africa won a single gold medal each. In all 15 nations won medals.

It marked the last time that Judo was classified as an optional sport at the Commonwealth Games only missing out at the 2018 Commonwealth Games in Gold Coast.

== Medal table ==
* Host nation (Scotland)

Rank	Nation	Gold	Silver	Bronze	Total
1	England	6	4	3	13
2	Scotland*	6	2	5	13
3	South Africa	1	1	2	4
4	Wales	1	0	1	2
5	New Zealand	0	2	3	5
6	India	0	2	2	4
7	Cameroon	0	1	1	2
8	Cyprus	0	1	0	1
8	Pakistan	0	1	0	1
10	Australia	0	0	4	4
11	Canada	0	0	3	3
12	Ghana	0	0	1	1
12	Mauritius	0	0	1	1
12	Northern Ireland	0	0	1	1
12	Zambia	0	0	1	1
Totals (15 entries)		14	14	28	56

== Results ==
=== Men's events ===
Event	Gold	Silver	Bronze
Extra-lightweight (60 kg)	Ashley McKenzie; England	Navjot Chana; India	Razak Abugiri; Ghana
Extra-lightweight (60 kg)	Ashley McKenzie; England	Navjot Chana; India	John Buchanan; Scotland
Half-lightweight (66 kg)	Colin Oates; England	Andreas Krassas; Cyprus	Siyabulela Mabulu; South Africa
Half-lightweight (66 kg)	Colin Oates; England	Andreas Krassas; Cyprus	James Millar; Scotland
Lightweight (73 kg)	Daniel Williams; England	Adrian Leat; New Zealand	Jake Bensted; Australia
Lightweight (73 kg)	Daniel Williams; England	Adrian Leat; New Zealand	Jacques van Zyl; South Africa
Half-middleweight (81 kg)	Owen Livesey; England	Tom Reed; England	Boas Munyonga; Zambia
Half-middleweight (81 kg)	Owen Livesey; England	Tom Reed; England	Jonah Burt; Canada
Middleweight (90 kg)	Zack Piontek; South Africa	Matthew Purssey; Scotland	Andrew Burns; Scotland
Middleweight (90 kg)	Zack Piontek; South Africa	Matthew Purssey; Scotland	Gary Hall; England
Half-heavyweight (100 kg)	Euan Burton; Scotland	Shah Hussain Shah; Pakistan	Jason Koster; New Zealand
Half-heavyweight (100 kg)	Euan Burton; Scotland	Shah Hussain Shah; Pakistan	Tim Slyfield; New Zealand
Heavyweight (+100 kg)	Christopher Sherrington; Scotland	Ruan Snyman; South Africa	Jake Andrewartha; Australia
Heavyweight (+100 kg)	Christopher Sherrington; Scotland	Ruan Snyman; South Africa	Mark Shaw; Wales

=== Women's events ===
Event	Gold	Silver	Bronze
Extra-lightweight (48 kg)	Kimberley Renicks; Scotland	Shushila Likmabam; India	Amy Meyer; Australia
Extra-lightweight (48 kg)	Kimberley Renicks; Scotland	Shushila Likmabam; India	Chloe Rayner; Australia
Half-lightweight (52 kg)	Louise Renicks; Scotland	Kelly Edwards; England	Lisa Kearney; Northern Ireland
Half-lightweight (52 kg)	Louise Renicks; Scotland	Kelly Edwards; England	Kalpana Thoudam; India
Lightweight (57 kg)	Nekoda Smythe-Davis; England	Stephanie Inglis; Scotland	Darcina Manuel; New Zealand
Lightweight (57 kg)	Nekoda Smythe-Davis; England	Stephanie Inglis; Scotland	Connie Ramsay; Scotland
Half-middleweight (63 kg)	Sarah Clark; Scotland	Helene Wezeu Dombeu; Cameroon	Faith Pitman; England
Half-middleweight (63 kg)	Sarah Clark; Scotland	Helene Wezeu Dombeu; Cameroon	Katie Jemima Yeats-Brown; England
Middleweight (70 kg)	Megan Fletcher; England	Moira de Villiers; New Zealand	Sally Conway; Scotland
Middleweight (70 kg)	Megan Fletcher; England	Moira de Villiers; New Zealand	Alix Renaud-Roy; Canada
Half-heavyweight (78 kg)	Natalie Powell; Wales	Gemma Gibbons; England	Hortense Mballa Atanga; Cameroon
Half-heavyweight (78 kg)	Natalie Powell; Wales	Gemma Gibbons; England	Ana Laura Portuondo Isasi; Canada
Heavyweight (+78 kg)	Sarah Adlington; Scotland	Jodie Myers; England	Annabelle Laprovidence; Mauritius
Heavyweight (+78 kg)	Sarah Adlington; Scotland	Jodie Myers; England	Rajwinder Kaur; India

== Participating nations ==
- Australia (13)
- Bahamas (2)
- Barbados (3)
- Botswana (1)
- Cameroon (14)
- Canada (11)
- Cyprus (3)
- England (14)
- Fiji (1)
- Ghana (8)
- Guernsey (1)
- India (14)
- Kenya (9)
- Malawi (2)
- Malta (3)
- Mauritius (4)
- Mozambique (3)
- New Zealand (10)
- Northern Ireland (6)
- Pakistan (1)
- Papua New Guinea (3)
- Rwanda (1)
- Samoa (1)
- Scotland (14)
- Seychelles (4)
- Sierra Leone (1)
- Solomon Islands (1)
- South Africa (6)
- Sri Lanka (3)
- Swaziland (1)
- Trinidad and Tobago (1)
- Tuvalu (3)
- Tanzania (7)
- Vanuatu (3)
- Zambia (4)
- Wales (10)

== See also ==
- Judo at the 2014 Summer Youth Olympics
