= Swimming at the 2014 Commonwealth Games – Men's 4 × 200 metre freestyle relay =

Men's 4 × 200 metre freestyle relay at the 2014 Commonwealth Games
- Venue: Tollcross International Swimming Centre
- Dates: 27 July 2014
- Competitors: 56 from 10 nations
- Winning time: 7:07.38 GR

Medalists
| gold medal | Cameron McEvoy; David McKeon; Ned McKendry; Thomas Fraser-Holmes; Mack Horton* | Australia |
| silver medal | Daniel Wallace; Stephen Milne; Duncan Scott; Robert Renwick; Jak Scott*; Gareth Mills*; Cameron Brodie*; Craig Hamilton* | Scotland |
| bronze medal | Devon Brown; Chad le Clos; Sebastien Rousseau; Dylan Bosch; Calvyn Justus* | South Africa |

The men's 4 × 200 metre freestyle relay event at the 2014 Commonwealth Games as part of the swimming programme took place on 27 July at the Tollcross International Swimming Centre in Glasgow, Scotland.

The medals were presented by Kalam Juman-Yassin, Commonwealth Games Federation regional vice-president, Americas, and president of the Guyana Olympic Association and the quaichs were presented by Morake Raleaka, secretary general of the Lesotho National Olympic Committee.

== Records ==
Prior to this competition, the existing world and Commonwealth Games records were as follows.

| World record | United States (USA); Michael Phelps (1:44.49); Ricky Berens (1:44.13); David Walters (1:45.47); Ryan Lochte (1:44.46) | 6:58.55 | Rome, Italy | 31 July 2009 |
| Commonwealth record | | | | |
| Games record | Australia; Thomas Fraser-Holmes (1:47.04); Nic Ffrost (1:48.68); Ryan Napoleon (1:47.05); Kenrick Monk (1:47.52) | 7:10.29 | Delhi, India | 6 October 2010 |

The following records were established during the competition:

| Date | Event | Nation | Swimmers | Time | Record |
|---|---|---|---|---|---|
| 27 July | Final | Australia | Cameron McEvoy (1:48.10); David McKeon (1:45.82); Ned McKendry (1:48.28); Thomas Fraser-Holmes (1:45.18) | 7:07.38 | GR |

== Results ==
=== Heats ===
| Rank | Heat | Lane | Nation | Swimmers | Time | Notes |
|---|---|---|---|---|---|---|
| 1 | 2 | 4 | Australia | Thomas Fraser-Holmes (1:48.57); David McKeon (1:46.94); Ned McKendry (1:48.17); Mack Horton (1:49.17) | 7:12.85 | Q |
| 2 | 2 | 6 | South Africa | Calvyn Justus (1:51.10); Sebastien Rousseau (1:48.03); Dylan Bosch (1:49.70); Devon Brown (1:47.61) | 7:16.44 | Q |
| 3 | 1 | 6 | Scotland | Jak Scott (1:50.06); Gareth Mills (1:49.37); Cameron Brodie (1:49.84); Craig Hamilton (1:49.66) | 7:18.93 | Q |
| 4 | 1 | 3 | New Zealand | Steven Kent (1:50.19); Ewan Jackson (1:49.27); Dylan Dunlop-Barrett (1:50.39); Mitchell Donaldson (1:49.84) | 7:19.69 | Q |
| 5 | 1 | 2 | Wales | Calum Jarvis (1:49.26); Otto Putland (1:52.55); Daniel Jervis (1:51.68); Xavier Mohammed (1:51.51) | 7:25.00 | Q |
| 6 | 1 | 4 | England | Jay Lelliott (1:49.72); Max Litchfield (1:52.20); Roberto Pavoni (1:50.44); Daniel Fogg (1:52.68) | 7:25.04 | Q |
| 7 | 2 | 2 | Singapore | Joseph Schooling (1:51.32); Danny Yeo (1:51.17); Quah Zheng Wen (1:52.01); Clement Lim (1:52.46) | 7:26.96 | Q |
| 8 | 2 | 3 | Malaysia | Kevin Yeap (1:51.69); Vernon Lee (1:51.89); Welson Sim (1:52.16); Lim Ching Hwang (1:51.24) | 7:26.98 | Q, NR |
| 9 | 2 | 5 | Guernsey | Jeremy Osborne (1:57.43); James Jurkiewicz (1:58.91); Oliver Nightingale (1:59.54); Luke Belton (1:59.45) | 7:55.33 | |
| 10 | 1 | 5 | Isle of Man | Grant Halsall (2:01.76); Guy Davies (2:05.30); Alex Bregazzi (1:59.18); Tom Bielich (2:00.14) | 8:06.38 | |

=== Final ===
| Rank | Lane | Nation | Swimmers | Time | Notes |
|---|---|---|---|---|---|
| 1st place, gold medalist(s) | 4 | Australia | Cameron McEvoy (1:48.10); David McKeon (1:45.82); Ned McKendry (1:48.28); Thomas Fraser-Holmes (1:45.18) | 7:07.38 | GR |
| 2nd place, silver medalist(s) | 3 | Scotland | Daniel Wallace (1:47.37); Stephen Milne (1:47.17); Duncan Scott (1:47.18); Robert Renwick (1:47.46) | 7:09.18 | |
| 3rd place, bronze medalist(s) | 5 | South Africa | Devon Brown (1:47.49); Chad le Clos (1:47.13); Sebastien Rousseau (1:47.03); Dylan Bosch (1:48.71) | 7:10.36 | |
| 4 | 7 | England | Nick Grainger (1:48.18); Lewis Coleman (1:49.14); Josh Walsh (1:49.19); James Guy (1:46.15) | 7:12.66 | |
| 5 | 6 | New Zealand | Matthew Stanley (1:47.75); Mitchell Donaldson (1:49.13); Ewan Jackson (1:49.27); Dylan Dunlop-Barrett (1:48.48) | 7:14.63 | |
| 6 | 2 | Wales | Calum Jarvis (1:47.13); Otto Putland (1:50.55); Xavier Mohammed (1:50.59); Ieuan Lloyd (1:47.69) | 7:15.96 | |
| 7 | 8 | Malaysia | Kevin Yeap (1:51.61); Vernon Lee (1:52.16); Welson Sim (1:51.94); Lim Ching Hwang (1:51.03) | 7:26.74 | NR |
| 8 | 1 | Singapore | Joseph Schooling (1:53.11); Danny Yeo (1:51.28); Quah Zheng Wen (1:52.39); Clement Lim (1:51.23) | 7:28.01 | |
