= Wrestling at the 2014 Commonwealth Games – Men's freestyle 86 kg =

Wrestling – Men's freestyle 86 kg at the 2014 Commonwealth Games
- Venue: Scottish Exhibition and Conference Centre
- Dates: 31 July 2014
- Competitors: 13 from 12 nations

Medalists
gold medal	Tamerlan Tagziev	Canada
silver medal	Andrew Dick	Nigeria
bronze medal	Armando Hietbrink	South Africa
bronze medal	Pawan Kumar	India

The nen's 86 kg freestyle wrestling competitions at the 2014 Commonwealth Games in Glasgow, Scotland was held on 31 July at the Scottish Exhibition and Conference Centre.

This freestyle wrestling competition consists of a single-elimination tournament, with a repechage used to determine the winner of two bronze medals. The two finalists face off for gold and silver medals. Each wrestler who loses to one of the two finalists moves into the repechage, culminating in a pair of bronze medal matches featuring the semifinal losers each facing the remaining repechage opponent from their half of the bracket.

== Results ==
Results:

=== Main bracket ===
Round of 16
Armando Hietbrink (RSA)	11
Oliver Cole (WAL)	0
Pawan Kumar (IND)	10
Steve Hill (NZL)	0
Luigi Bianco (SCO)	8
Elie Zamdam (CMR)	3
Tamerlan Tagziev (CAN)	10
Ali Abdo (AUS)	0
Muhammad Inam (PAK)	12
Lasantha Ekanayaka (SRI)	1

Quarterfinals
Andrew Dick (NGR)	10
Peter Omenda (KEN)	0
Lewis Waddell (SCO)	0
Armando Hietbrink (RSA)	11
Pawan Kumar (IND)	5
Luigi Bianco (SCO)	0
Tamerlan Tagziev (CAN)	11
Muhammad Inam (PAK)	4

Semifinals
Andrew Dick (NGR)	10
Armando Hietbrink (RSA)	0
Pawan Kumar (IND)	0
Tamerlan Tagziev (CAN)	4

Final
Andrew Dick (NGR)	4
Tamerlan Tagziev (CAN)	14

=== Repechage ===
Repechage first round
Ali Abdo (AUS)	3
Muhammad Inam (PAK)	10

Bronze medal match
Peter Omenda (KEN)	0
Armando Hietbrink (RSA)	10
Muhammad Inam (PAK)	6
Pawan Kumar (IND)	6
