= Judo at the 2014 Commonwealth Games – Men's 90 kg =

Judo competition

Judo Judo – Men's 90 kg at the 2014 Commonwealth Games
- Venue: Scottish Exhibition and Conference Centre
- Date: 26 July 2014
- Competitors: 15 from 13 nations

Medalists
gold medal	Zack Piontek	South Africa
silver medal	Matthew Purssey	Scotland
bronze medal	Andrew Burns	Scotland
bronze medal	Gary Hall	England

The men's 90 kg Judo competitions at the 2014 Commonwealth Games in Glasgow, Scotland was held on 25 July at the Scottish Exhibition and Conference Centre. Judo will return to the program, after last being competed back in 2002.

== Results ==
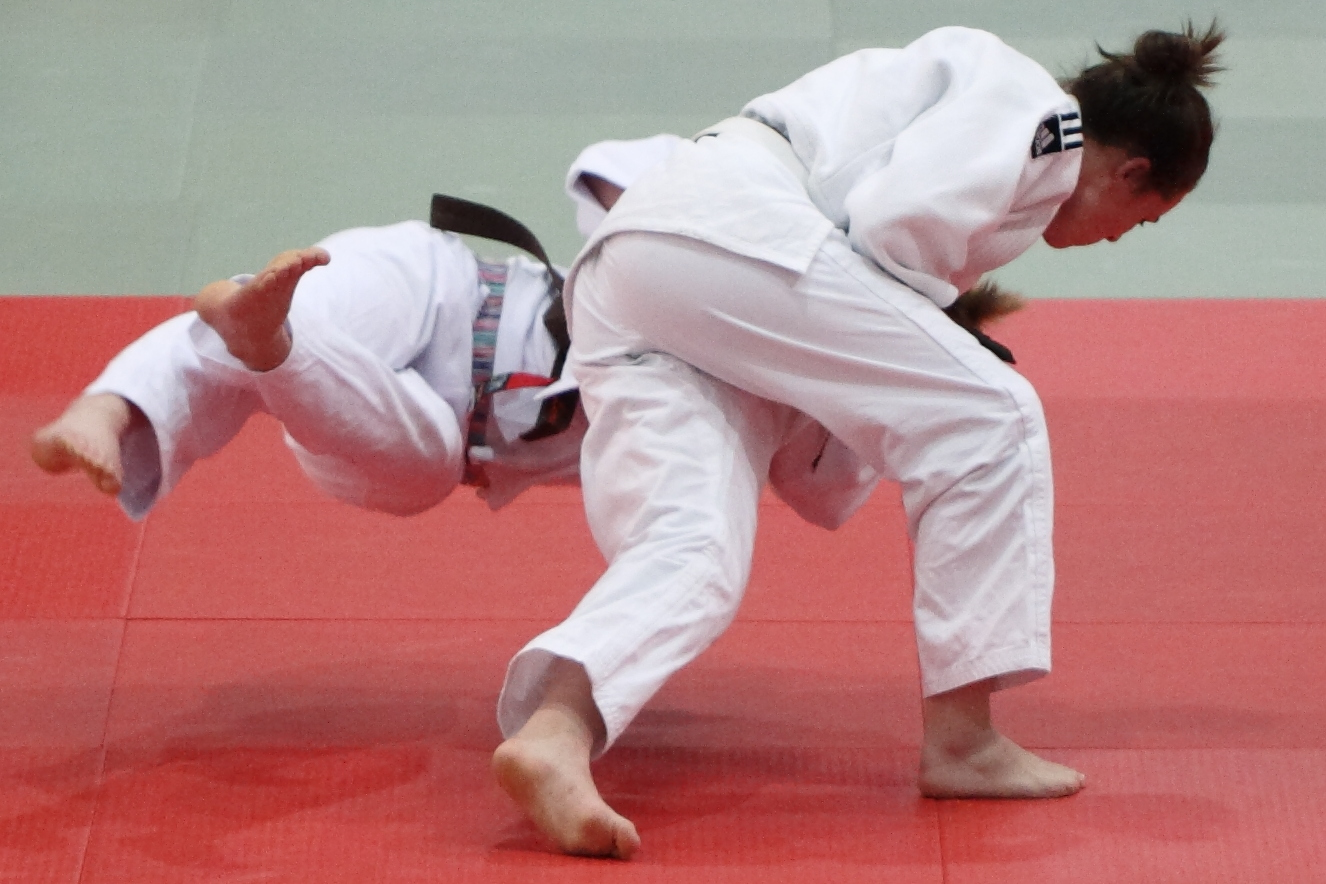
Example of a judo throw

=== Final ===
Gold medal
Z Piontek (RSA)	0010
M Purssey (SCO)	0000

=== Repechages ===
Repechage		Bronze medal
J Wickramage (SRI)	0001
A Burns (SCO)	1000	A Burns (SCO)	0021
		M Anthony (AUS)	0010

Repechage		Bronze medal
		R Dill-Russell (NZL)	000
Gary Hall (ENG)	1000	Gary Hall (ENG)	100
S Ombiongno (CMR)	0013

=== Preliminaries ===
Round of 16
G Mtawa (TAN)	0003
J Wickramage (SRI)	0113
Z Piontek (RSA)	1010
L Plevin (GUE)	0000
A Burns (SCO)	1101
D Dolassem (CMR)	0003
M Anthony (AUS)	1021
I Bezzina (MLT)	0010
G Hall (ENG)	1000
L Sang (KEN)	0000
M Purssey (SCO)	1001
A Singh (IND)	0000
S Ombiongno (CMR)	1001
V Ahiavor (GHA)	0004

Quarterfinals
R Dill-Russell (NZL)	1000
J Wickramage (SRI)	0002
Z Piontek (RSA)	1011
A Burns (SCO)	0001
M Anthony (AUS)	0110
G Hall (ENG)	0001
M Purssey (SCO)	1002
S Ombiongno (CMR)	0004

Semifinals
R Dill-Russell (NZL)	0001
Z Piontek (RSA)	1002
M Anthony (AUS)	0001
M Purssey (SCO)	0102

Gold medal match
Z Piontek (RSA)	0010
M Purssey (SCO)	0000
