= David McKeon =

Australian swimmer

Personal information
- National team: Australia
- Born: 25 July 1992 (age 34) Wollongong, New South Wales
- Height: 1.95 m (6 ft 5 in)
- Weight: 85 kg (187 lb)

Sport
- Sport: Swimming
- Strokes: Freestyle
- Club: West Illawarra/NSWIS
- Coach: Ron McKeon
Medal record
Men's swimming
Representing Australia
World Championships (LC)
Bronze medal – third place	2015 Kazan	4×200 m freestyle
Pan Pacific Championships
Bronze medal – third place	2014 Gold Coast	4×200 m freestyle
Commonwealth Games
Gold medal – first place	2014 Glasgow	4×200 m freestyle
Silver medal – second place	2014 Glasgow	400 m freestyle

David McKeon (born 25 July 1992) is an Australian competition swimmer. At the 2012 Summer Olympics in London, he competed in the men's 400-metre freestyle, finishing in 14th place in the heats, failing to reach the final.

== Personal life ==
McKeon was born on 25 July 1992 in Wollongong, New South Wales, Australia. He is the son of the former Olympic swimmer Ron McKeon and Commonwealth Games swimmer Susie. He has two sisters, Kaitlin and Emma, a swimmer who has won 11 Olympic medals which is the most won by any Australian Olympian.

== Swimming ==
McKeon won a gold medal in the 400 metres freestyle at the 2011 Summer Universiade in Shenzhen, China.

At the 2012 Summer Olympics held in London, United Kingdom, he competed in the 400 metre freestyle, finishing fifth in his heat and 14th overall with a time of 3:48.57, but failing to qualify for the final. He then swam in the heats of the 4 × 200 metre freestyle relay, helping Australia to qualify for the final where they eventually placed fifth.

In 2013 he competed at the 15th FINA World Championships held in Barcelona, Spain, where he placed 12th in the 400 metre freestyle and was part of an Australian quartet, alongside Ned McKendry, Alexander Graham and Jarrod Killey, which failed to advance to the final of the 4 × 200 metre freestyle relay after placing ninth in the heats.

He represented Australia at the 2014 Commonwealth Games held in Glasgow, Scotland, where he won a gold medal and a silver medal. Alongside Cameron McEvoy, Ned McKendry and Thomas Fraser-Holmes he set a Commonwealth Games record to win the gold medal in the 4 × 200 metre freestyle relay. He won the silver medal in the 400 metre freestyle, finishing behind Canada's Ryan Cochrane in a time of 3:44.09. He also placed fourth in the final of the 200 metre freestyle.

In April 2016 McKeon was selected as part of the Australian team for the 2016 Summer Olympics due to be held in Rio de Janeiro, Brazil. His sister Emma was also selected meaning the pair were the first brother and sister to swim at an Olympic Games for Australia since John and Ilsa Konrads in 1960. He also competed in the 400 metre freestyle and the 4 × 200 metre freestyle relay.

== See also ==
- List of Commonwealth Games medallists in swimming (men)
