= Wrestling at the 2014 Commonwealth Games – Women's freestyle 53 kg =

Wrestling – Women's freestyle 53 kg at the 2014 Commonwealth Games
- Venue: Scottish Exhibition and Conference Centre
- Dates: 30 July 2014
- Competitors: 8 from 7 nations

Medalists
gold medal	Odunayo Adekuoroye	Nigeria
silver medal	Lalita Sehrawat	India
bronze medal	Jillian Gallays	Canada
bronze medal	Mpho Madi	South Africa

The women's 53 kg freestyle wrestling competitions at the 2014 Commonwealth Games in Glasgow, Scotland was held on 30 July at the Scottish Exhibition and Conference Centre.

This freestyle wrestling competition consists of a single-elimination tournament, with a repechage used to determine the winner of two bronze medals. The two finalists face off for gold and silver medals. Each wrestler who loses to one of the two finalists moves into the repechage, culminating in a pair of bronze medal matches featuring the semifinal losers each facing the remaining repechage opponent from their half of the bracket.

== Results ==
Results:

Legend

- F — Won by fall

=== Main bracket ===
Quarterfinals
Rupinder Kaur Sandhu (AUS)	3
Christelle Lemofack Letchidji (CMR)	8
Jillian Gallays (CAN)	0
Odunayo Adekuoroye (NGR)	11
Lalita Sehrawat (IND)	10
Mpho Madi (RSA)	0
Jayne Clason (SCO)	1
Shannon Hawke (SCO)	14

Semifinals
Christelle Lemofack Letchidji (CMR)	0
Odunayo Adekuoroye (NGR)	10
Lalita Sehrawat (IND)	4^{F}
Shannon Hawke (SCO)	0

Final
Odunayo Adekuoroye (NGR)	2^{F}
Lalita Sehrawat (IND)	0

=== Repechage ===
Bronze medal match
Jillian Gallays (CAN)	4^{F}
Christelle Lemofack Letchidjio (CMR)	0
Mpho Madi (RSA)	4^{F}
Shannon Hawke (SCO)	0
