= Judo at the 2014 Commonwealth Games – Women's 57 kg =

Judo Judo – Women's 57 kg at the 2014 Commonwealth Games
- Venue: Scottish Exhibition and Conference Centre
- Date: 24 July 2014
- Competitors: 11 from 10 nations

Medalists
gold medal	Nekoda Smythe-Davis	England
silver medal	Stephanie Inglis	Scotland
bronze medal	Darcina Manuel	New Zealand
bronze medal	Connie Ramsay	Scotland

The women's 57 kg Judo competitions at the 2014 Commonwealth Games in Glasgow, Scotland was held on 24 July at the Scottish Exhibition and Conference Centre. Judo returned to the program, after last being competed back in 2002.

== Preliminaries ==
Round of 16
S Inglis (SCO)	1000
N.N.Nik Azman (MAS)	0000
J Klimkait (CAN)	1020
Shivani (IND)	0003
K Powell (WAL)	1000
C Rahming (BAH)	0000

Quarterfinals
D Manuel (NZL)	0003
S Inglis (SCO)	0011
P Sitcheping (CMR)	1000
S Sylva (MRI)	0001
C Ramsay (SCO)	0001
J Klimkait (CAN)	0113
N Davis (ENG)	1000
K Powell (WAL)	0001

Semifinals
S Inglis (SCO)	0002
P Sitcheping (CMR)	0003
J Klimkait (CAN)	0002
N Davis (ENG)	0001

Gold medal match
S Inglis (SCO)	0001
N Davis (ENG)	1011

=== Repechages ===
Repechage		Bronze medal
Darcina Manuel (NZL)	0001
Sarah Sylva (MRI)	0003	Darcina Manuel (NZL)	1001
		Jessica Klimkait (CAN)	0001

Repechage		Bronze medal
Connie Ramsay (SCO)	1000
Kirsty Powell (WAL)	0003	Connie Ramsay (SCO)	1011
		Paule Sitcheping (CMR)	0000
