= Swimming at the 2014 Commonwealth Games – Men's 200 metre backstroke =

Men's 200 metre backstroke at the 2014 Commonwealth Games
- Venue: Tollcross International Swimming Centre
- Dates: 28 July 2014
- Competitors: 18 from 15 nations
- Winning time: 1:55.83

Medalists
gold medal	Mitch Larkin	Australia
silver medal	Josh Beaver	Australia
bronze medal	Matson Lawson	Australia

The men's 200 metre backstroke event at the 2014 Commonwealth Games as part of the swimming programme took place on 28 July at the Tollcross International Swimming Centre in Glasgow, Scotland.

The medals were presented by Gregor Tait, the 2006 Commonwealth champion in this event and the quaichs were presented by Stuart Ogg, Director of Corporate Services of Sportscotland.

== Records ==
Prior to this competition, the existing world and Commonwealth Games records were as follows.

World record	Aaron Peirsol (USA)	1:51.92	Rome, Italy	31 July 2009
Commonwealth record	James Goddard (ENG)	1:55:58	Delhi, India	6 October 2010
Games record	James Goddard (ENG)	1:55:58	Delhi, India	6 October 2010

== Results ==
=== Heats ===
Rank	Heat	Lane	Name	Nationality	Time	Notes
1	3	4	Mitch Larkin	Australia	1:57.44	Q
2	1	4	Matson Lawson	Australia	1:57.79	Q
3	1	3	Corey Main	New Zealand	1:57.86	Q
4	3	5	Josh Beaver	Australia	1:58.34	Q
5	2	5	Ryan Bennett	Scotland	1:59.44	Q
6	3	3	Russell Wood	Canada	1:59.92	Q
7	2	4	Craig McNally	Scotland	2:00.00	Q
8	2	3	Xavier Mohammed	Wales	2:01.04	Q
9	1	5	Darren Murray	South Africa	2:01.48	
10	3	6	Grant Halsall	Isle of Man	2:05.30	
11	1	6	Tom Gallichan	Jersey	2:09.15	
12	1	2	Timothy Wynter	Jamaica	2:09.23	
13	3	2	Tern Jian Han	Malaysia	2:10.07	
14	3	7	James Jurkiewicz	Guernsey	2:11.61	
15	2	7	Christopher Courtis	Barbados	2:13.18	
16	2	2	Alex McCallum	Cayman Islands	2:13.87	
17	1	7	Steven Maina	Kenya	2:14.90	
	2	6	Roberto Pavoni	England		DNS

=== Final ===
Rank	Lane	Name	Nationality	Time	Notes
1st place, gold medalist(s)	4	Mitch Larkin	Australia	1:55.83	
2nd place, silver medalist(s)	6	Josh Beaver	Australia	1:56.19	
3rd place, bronze medalist(s)	5	Matson Lawson	Australia	1:56.63	
4	3	Corey Main	New Zealand	1:57.79	
5	1	Craig McNally	Scotland	1:58.27	
6	2	Ryan Bennett	Scotland	1:58.45	
7	7	Russell Wood	Canada	1:59.32	
8	8	Xavier Mohammed	Wales	1:59.65	
