= Athletics at the 2014 Commonwealth Games – Men's 100 metres (T37) =

The Men's 100 metres (T37) at the 2014 Commonwealth Games as part of the athletics programme was held at Hampden Park on 28 July 2014. The event was open to Para-sport athletes competing under the T37 classification.

== Results ==
=== First round ===
The first round consisted of two heats, with qualification to the finals for the first three in each heat and the two fastest losers over the two heats.

==== Heat 1 ====
Rank	Lane	Name	Reaction Time	Result	Notes	Qual.
1	1	Charl du Toit (RSA)	0.235	12.02		Q
2	3	Jason Maclean (SCO)		12.96		Q
3	5	Sean Roberts (AUS)	0.193	12.99		Q
4	6	Elias Larry (PNG)	0.236	13.34		q
5	2	Jonathan kipchumba Sum (KEN)		13.39		
6	4	Andy Labrosse (SEY)		18.76	PB	
				Wind: +0.1 m/s		

==== Heat 2 ====
Rank	Lane	Name	Reaction Time	Result	Notes	Qual.
1	6	Fanie van der Merwe (RSA)	0.203	11.75		Q
2	2	Rhys Jones (WAL)	0.168	12.10	SB	Q
3	4	Andrea Dalle Ave (RSA)	0.212	12.61		Q
4	5	Daniel Hooker (ENG)	0.198	13.09	SB	q
5	3	Lewis Clow (SCO)	0.216	13.41		
6	1	Jean-paul Juliette (SEY)		24.03	PB	
				Wind: -1.4 m/s		

=== Final ===
Rank	Lane	Name	Reaction Time	Result	Notes
1st place, gold medalist(s)	3	Fanie van der Merwe (RSA)	0.187	11.65	
2nd place, silver medalist(s)	4	Charl du Toit (RSA)	0.189	11.89	
3rd place, bronze medalist(s)	5	Rhys Jones (WAL)	0.158	12.04	SB
4	8	Andrea Dalle Ave (RSA)	0.186	12.39	SB
5	6	Jason Maclean (SCO)	0.180	12.93	PB
6	7	Sean Roberts (AUS)	0.191	13.10	
7	1	Daniel Hooker (ENG)	0.189	13.15	
8	2	Elias Larry (PNG)	0.233	13.42	
				Wind: -1.7 m/s	
