= Melvin Bibo =

Nigerian freestyle wrestler

Sport
- Country: Nigeria
- Sport: Amateur wrestling
- Event: Freestyle
Medal record
Men's freestyle wrestling
Representing Nigeria
Commonwealth Games
Silver medal – second place	2018 Gold Coast	86 kg
Bronze medal – third place	2014 Glasgow	74 kg
African Championships
Gold medal – first place	2018 Port Harcourt	86 kg
Bronze medal – third place	2016 Alexandria	74 kg
Bronze medal – third place	2019 Hammamet	86 kg

Melvin Bibo is a Nigerian freestyle wrestler. He won one of the bronze medals in the men's 74 kg event at the 2014 Commonwealth Games and the silver medal in the men's 86 kg event at the 2018 Commonwealth Games.

In 2016, he won one of the bronze medals in the men's 74 kg event at the 2016 African Wrestling Championships. At the 2018 African Wrestling Championships he won the gold medal in the men's 86 kg event. The following year at the 2019 African Wrestling Championships he won one of the bronze medals in the men's 86 kg event.
