= Wrestling at the 2014 Commonwealth Games – Women's freestyle 69 kg =

Wrestling – Women's freestyle 69 kg at the 2014 Commonwealth Games
- Venue: Scottish Exhibition and Conference Centre
- Dates: 30 July 2014
- Competitors: 7 from 7 nations

Medalists
gold medal	Dorothy Yeats	Canada
silver medal	Angele Tomo	Cameroon
bronze medal	Navjot Kaur	India
bronze medal	Hannah Rueben	Nigeria

The women's 69 kg freestyle wrestling competitions at the 2014 Commonwealth Games in Glasgow, Scotland was held on 30 July at the Scottish Exhibition and Conference Centre.

This freestyle wrestling competition consists of a single-elimination tournament, with a repechage used to determine the winner of two bronze medals. The two finalists face off for gold and silver medals. Each wrestler who loses to one of the two finalists moves into the repechage, culminating in a pair of bronze medal matches featuring the semifinal losers each facing the remaining repechage opponent from their half of the bracket.

== Results ==
Results:

Legend

- F — Won by fall

=== Main bracket ===
Quarterfinals		Semifinals		Final
		Navjot Kaur (IND)	0
Dorothy Yeats (CAN)	11	Dorothy Yeats (CAN)	10
Sarah Jones (SCO)	0			Dorothy Yeats (CAN)	10
Emily Mbogo (KEN)	0			Angele Tomo (CMR)	0
Refilwe Molongwana (RSA)	4^{F}	Refilwe Molongwana (RSA)	0
Hannah Rueben (NGR)	9	Angele Tomo (CMR)	8
Angele Tomo (CMR)	18

=== Repechage ===
Bronze medal match
Sarah Jones (SCO)	0
Navjot Kaur (IND)	13
Hannah Rueben (NGR)	12
Refilwe Molongwana (RSA)	2
