= Josh Beaver =

Australian swimmer (born 1993)

Personal information
- Nickname: Beaver
- National team: Australia
- Born: 1 March 1993 (age 33) Dandenong, Victoria
- Education: Tooradin Primary School, Victoria
- Height: 1.73 m (5 ft 8 in)
- Weight: 70 kg (150 lb)

Sport
- Sport: Swimming
- Strokes: Backstroke
- Club: Nunawading Swimming Club
- Coach: Rohan Taylor
Medal record
Men's swimming
Representing Australia
Commonwealth Games
Silver medal – second place	2014 Glasgow	200 m backstroke
Silver medal – second place	2014 Glasgow	4×100 m medley
Bronze medal – third place	2014 Glasgow	100 m backstroke
Bronze medal – third place	2018 Gold Coast	200 m backstroke

Joshua Beaver (born 1 March 1993) is an Australian swimmer who specialises in backstroke. He competed at the 2016 Summer Olympics in the 100 metre backstroke and the 200 metre backstroke. He finished 13th and 10th in the semifinals, respectively.

Beaver also competed in the 200 metre backstroke at the 2015 World Aquatics Championships in Kazan and is a Commonwealth Games medalist. Competing at the 2014 Commonwealth Games in Glasgow, he won silver in the 200m backstroke and 4 × 100 m medley relay, and bronze in the 100m backstroke.
