= Wrestling at the 2014 Commonwealth Games – Women's freestyle 55 kg =

Wrestling – Women's freestyle 55 kg at the 2014 Commonwealth Games
- Venue: Scottish Exhibition and Conference Centre
- Dates: 31 July 2014
- Competitors: 8 from 7 nations

Medalists
gold medal	Babita Kumari	India
silver medal	Brittanee Laverdure	Canada
bronze medal	Ifeoma Nwoye	Nigeria
bronze medal	Louisa Porogovska	England

The women's 55 kg freestyle wrestling competitions at the 2014 Commonwealth Games in Glasgow, Scotland was held on 31 July at the Scottish Exhibition and Conference Centre.

== Results ==
Results:

=== Bracket ===
Quarterfinals		Semifinals		Final
Jeanne-Marie Coetzer (RSA)	2
Ifeoma Nwoye (NGR)	13	Ifeoma Nwoye (NGR)	4
Brittanee Laverdure (CAN)	10	Brittanee Laverdure (CAN)	6
Joseph Essombe Tiako (CMR)	0			Brittanee Laverdure (CAN)	2
Kathryn Marsh (SCO)	2			Babita Kumari (IND)	9
Babita Kumari (IND)	13	Babita Kumari (IND)	2^{F}
Louisa Porogovska (ENG)	8	Louisa Porogovska (ENG)	0
Chelsea Murphy (SCO)	0

=== Repechage ===
Bronze medal match
Joseph Essombe Tiako (CMR)	0
Ifeoma Nwoye (NGR)	6

Bronze medal match
Kathryn Marsh (SCO)	2
Louisa Porogovska (ENG)	4
