= Wrestling at the 2014 Commonwealth Games – Men's freestyle 74 kg =

Men's freestyle wrestling competition at the 2014 Commonwealth Games

Wrestling – Men's freestyle 74 kg at the 2014 Commonwealth Games
- Venue: Scottish Exhibition and Conference Centre
- Dates: 29 July 2014
- Competitors: 17 from 17 nations

Medalists
gold medal	Sushil Kumar	India
silver medal	Qamar Abbas	Pakistan
bronze medal	Mike Grundy	England
bronze medal	Melvin Bibo	Nigeria

The men's 74 kg freestyle wrestling competitions at the 2014 Commonwealth Games in Glasgow, Scotland was held on 29 July at the Scottish Exhibition and Conference Centre.

This freestyle wrestling competition consists of a single-elimination tournament, with a repechage used to determine the winner of two bronze medals. The two finalists face off for gold and silver medals. Each wrestler who loses to one of the two finalists moves into the repechage, culminating in a pair of bronze medal matches featuring the semifinal losers each facing the remaining repechage opponent from their half of the bracket.

== Results ==
Legend

- F — Won by fall

=== Final ===
Final
Qamar Abbas (PAK)	0
Sushil Kumar (IND)	8

=== Top half ===
Round of 32

Round of 16
Rashji Mackey (BAH)	0
Gerald Meyer (RSA)	10
Mike Grundy (ENG)	10
Romeo Djoumessi (CMR)	0
David Galea (MLT)	10
Iabin Tokia (KIR)	0
Qamar Abbas (PAK)	10
Katea Tebitara (SOL)	0

Quarterfinals
Gerald Meyer (RSA)	9
Mike Grundy (ENG)	10
David Galea (MLT)	0
Qamar Abbas (PAK)	10

Semifinals
Mike Grundy (ENG)	6
Qamar Abbas (PAK)	11

=== Bottom half ===
Round of 32
Chris Laverick (CAN)	4
Melvin Bibo (NGR)	14

Round of 16
Gilbert Emilie (MRI)	8
Kushan Sandrage (SRI)	7^{F}
Jayden Lawrence (AUS)	0
Sushil Kumar (IND)	11
Tommy Hawthorn (WAL)	11
Dipu Ray (BAN)	0
Alpha Bangura (SLE)	0
Melvin Bibo (NGR)	8

Quarterfinals
Kushan Sandrage (SRI)	4
Sushil Kumar (IND)	8
Tommy Hawthorn (WAL)	0
Melvin Bibo (NGR)	12

Semifinals
Sushil Kumar (IND)	8
Melvin Bibo (NGR)	4

=== Repechage ===
Repechage second round
Katea Tebitara (SOL)	0
David Galea (MLT)	7
Jayden Lawrence (AUS)	5
Kushan Sandrage (SRI)	2

Bronze medal match
David Galea (MLT)	0
Mike Grundy (ENG)	10
Jayden Lawrence (AUS)	0
Melvin Bibo (NGR)	4
