= Connie Ramsay =

Scottish judoka

Personal information
- Born: 24 February 1988 (age 38) Inverness, Scotland
- Occupation: Judoka

Sport
- Sport: Judo
- Weight class: –57 kg
Medal record
Commonwealth Games
Bronze medal – third place	2014 Glasgow	57 kg

Profile at external databases
- JudoInside.com: 30441

Connie Ramsay (born 24 February 1988) is a Scottish judoka and politician, who competed at the Commonwealth Games.

== Judo career ==
Ramsay became champion of Great Britain, winning the lightweight division at the British Judo Championships in 2012.

Ramsay competed at the 2014 Commonwealth Games, where she won a bronze medal in the 57 kg event.

== Political career ==
Ramsay entered the by-election for Tain and Easter Ross in the Highland Council, competing with the Scottish Liberal Democrats. She cited opposition to the closure of the Tain Royal Academy Community Complex (TRACC) as her reasoning to enter politics, along with improving roads, public transport, and access to NHS services. She had the endorsement of local House of Commons MP Jamie Stone, himself a former councillor for Tain and Easter Ross word. Ramsay won the by-election after 6 stages with 935 first preference votes, or 38.8% of the vote, taking a seat previously held by the Scottish National Party.
