= Gary Hall (judoka) =

British judoka (born 1990)

Personal information
- Nationality: British (English)
- Born: 27 March 1990 (age 36) Bristol, England

Sport
- Sport: Judo
- Event: Men's 90 kg
- Club: Ryu Genki
- Coached by: Des Hall; Juergen Klinger
Medal record
Representing England
Men's Judo
Commonwealth Games
Bronze medal – third place	2014 Glasgow	Men's 90 kg
- Updated on 15 September 2014

Gary Hall (born 27 March 1990) is a British judoka.

== Judo career ==
He competed for England in the men's 90 kg event at the 2014 Commonwealth Games where he won a bronze medal.

He is a two times champion of Great Britain, winning the middleweight division at the British Judo Championships in 2014 and 2015.
