= Darcina Manuel =

New Zealand judoka (born 1992)

Personal information
- Full name: Darcina Manuel
- Born: 24 September 1992 (age 33) Gisborne, New Zealand

Sport
- Country: New Zealand
- Sport: Judo
- Event: Women's 57 kg
Medal record
Representing New Zealand
Judo
Commonwealth Games
| Bronze medal – third place | 2014 Glasgow | Women's 57 kg |
- Updated on 26 July 2014

Darcina Manuel (born 24 September 1992) is a New Zealand judoka. She competed in the Women's 57 kg event at the 2014 Commonwealth Games where she won a bronze medal.

Of Māori descent, Manuel affiliates to the Ngāti Porou iwi.
