= Odunayo Adekuoroye =

Nigerian freestyle wrestler (born 1993)

Personal information
- Full name: Odunayo Folasade Adekuoroye
- Nickname: Pantera dancer
- Nationality: Nigerian
- Born: 10 December 1993 (age 32) Ilutitun, Ondo State, Nigeria
- Weight: 51 kg (112 lb)

Sport
- Country: Nigeria
- Sport: Wrestling
- Event: Women's 53 kg
Medal record
Women's freestyle wrestling
Representing Nigeria
World Championships
Silver medal – second place	2017 Paris	55 kg
Bronze medal – third place	2015 Las Vegas	53 kg
Bronze medal – third place	2019 Nur-Sultan	57 kg
Bronze medal – third place	2023 Belgrade	57 kg
African Championships
Gold medal – first place	2022 El Jadida	59 kg
Gold medal – first place	2024 Alexandria	57 kg
African Games
Gold medal – first place	2019 Rabat	57 kg
Gold medal – first place	2023 Accra	57 kg
Islamic Solidarity Games
Gold medal – first place	2021 Konya	59 kg
Commonwealth Games
Gold medal – first place	2014 Glasgow	53 kg
Gold medal – first place	2018 Gold Coast	57 kg
Gold medal – first place	2022 Birmingham	57 kg
Bronze medal – third place	2010 Delhi	48 kg

Odunayo Folasade Adekuoroye (born 10 December 1993) is a Nigerian freestyle wrestler. She competed in the women's freestyle 53 kg event at the 2014 Commonwealth Games where she won the gold medal and at the 2015 World Wrestling Championships where she won a bronze medal. She won the silver medal at the women's freestyle 55 kilograms 2017 World Wrestling Championships.

== First fight ==
Adekuoroye participated in Nigeria's 15th National Sport Festival held in Ogun State, where she won the gold medal in the cadet category. In March 2019, Adekuoroye was ranked 4th in the Women's 57 kg wrestling class by United World Wrestling.

== Commonwealth experience ==
She participated in the Commonwealth tournament for the first time in 2010, representing Team Nigeria in India. She won the bronze medal in the 48 kg category at the age of 17 years.

In 2014, she defeated Indian Sehrawat Lalita in the final of the women's freestyle 53 kg category to win her first Commonwealth game gold medal.

In 2018, Adekuoroye participated in the 2018 Commonwealth Games in Gold Coast, Australia, winning her second Commonwealth gold medal in the Women's Freestyle 57 kg weight class, defeating Pooja Dhanda of India in the final.

Adekuoroye won a third Commonwealth Games gold medal at the 2022 Commonwealth Games, defeating India's Anshu Malik in the final.

== Career ==
Adekuoroye picked up a gold medal in 2016 by defeating Russia's Nina Menkenova in the final for 55 kg women's freestyle at the 2016 Golden Grand Prix in Azerbaijan, adding to the bronze medal she won in 2015 at the World Wrestling Championship in Las Vegas.

In 2017, Odunayo Adekuoroye was ranked number one by the United World Wrestling (UWW) at women's freestyle 55 kg category, and went onto win silver medal in 55 kg category after losing narrowly to Japan's Haruna Okuno in the final of 2017 World Wrestling Championship, held in Paris, France.

Odunayo Adekuoroye competed and won gold at the 2019 German Grand Prix Championship. The tournament that was held in Dormagen saw Adekuoroye win the 57 kg weight class of Women's freestyle without losing a point throughout the tournament, just as she defeated Hungarian Anna Szell in the final by 10–0. After which she clinched a bronze medal in the 57 kg class at the Dan Kolov-Nikola Petrov ranking series tournament in Ruse, Bulgaria, 2019.

Following her outing at the German Grand Prix and Dan Kolov-Nikola Petrov ranking series tournament in Ruse, Bulgaria, Adekuoroye participated in the 2019 African Wrestling Championships, Hammamat, Tunisia, defeating Cameroon's Essone Tiako in 29 seconds in the final of Women freestyle event. She was named the best Female Wrestler of the tournament. In July 2019, she defeated Tetyana Kit of Ukraine 10–0 in the final to win gold in the 57 kg category at Yasar Dogu Ranking series event in Istanbul, Turkey.

In 2020, she won the gold medal in the women's freestyle 57 kg event at the 2020 African Wrestling Championships. In 2021, she won a gold medal at the Baraza Champion of Champions wrestling tournament held in Yenagoa, Bayelsa State, Nigeria. In June 2021, she won the gold medal in her event at the 2021 Poland Open held in Warsaw, Poland.

She represented Nigeria at the 2020 Summer Olympics in Tokyo, Japan. She competed in the women's 57 kg event, where she was eliminated in her first match by Anastasia Nichita of Moldova.

In 2022, she won one of the bronze medals in her event at the Matteo Pellicone Ranking Series 2022 held in Rome, Italy. She won the gold medal in the 59 kg event at the 2021 Islamic Solidarity Games held in Konya, Turkey.

She competed in the women's 57 kg event at the 2024 Summer Olympics in Paris, France.

== Rio 2016 Olympic experience ==
In the 2016 Olympics, she was defeated by Sweden's Sofia Mattsson in the quarter-final.

Olympic Games
Preceded by Ngozi Onwumere	Flagbearer for Nigeria; Tokyo 2020 with Quadri Aruna	Succeeded by Seun Adigun
