= Louisa Porogovska =

British freestyle wrestler

Personal information
- Nationality: British
- Born: 31 March 1987 (age 39) Preston, England
- Height: 4 ft 11 in (150 cm)
- Weight: 55 kg (121 lb)

Sport
- Country: England
- Sport: Wrestling
- Event: Women's 55 kg
Medal record
Women's freestyle wrestling
Representing England
Commonwealth Games
Bronze medal – third place	2014 Glasgow	55 kg
- Updated on 4 October 2014

Louisa Porogovska (born 31 March 1987) is a British freestyle wrestler. She competed for England in the women's freestyle 55 kg event at the 2014 Commonwealth Games where she won a bronze medal.

== Filmography ==
Dangal (2016) - Played Fictional Character - Wrestler "Angelina Watson"
