= Pawan Kumar (wrestler) =

Indian wrestler (born 1993)

Personal information
- Nationality: Indian
- Born: 16 October 1993 (age 33) Nangal Thakran, Delhi, India
- Education: Maharshi Dayanand University, Rohtak
- Occupations: Government official, Indian Railways
- Height: 173 cm (5 ft 8 in)
- Weight: 86 kg (190 lb)
- Spouse: Geeta Phogat

Sport
- Country: India
- Sport: Freestyle wrestling
- Event: 86 kg
Medal record
Representing India
Men's Freestyle Wrestling
Commonwealth Games
Bronze medal – third place	2014 Glasgow	86 kg
Commonwealth Championships
Gold medal – first place	2011 Melbourne	84 kg
Gold medal – first place	2013 Johannesburg	84 kg
Silver medal – second place	2017 Johannesburg	86 kg
- Updated on 18 August 2018

Pawan Kumar (born 16 October 1993), is an Indian freestyle wrestler. He represented India at the 2014 Commonwealth Games in the 86 kg weight class in which he won the bronze medal. He also represented India at the 2014 Asian Games in the 86 kg weight class. His spouse is fellow wrestler Geeta Phogat.

== Personal life ==
Kumar, also known as Pawan Saroha, married Geeta Phogat, an Olympic wrestler, on 20 November 2016. The couple had their first child, a boy Arjun Saroha, on 24 December 2019.

== Career ==
=== 2014 Commonwealth Games ===
At the 2014 Commonwealth Games, the young wrestler began his maiden CWG campaign in Glasgow, Scotland with a round of 16 matchup against Steve Hill of New Zealand, winning the match 4–0. Kumar met Luigi Bianco of Scotland in the quarter-finals and beat him 5–0. In the semi-finals, Kumar lost out to Tamerlan Tagziev of Canada with the burly Canadian beating him 5–0. There was still a chance of a medal with Kumar competing in the bronze medal match. He faced Muhammad Inam of Pakistan and ended the tightly contested match 6-6. But he was awarded the bronze medal in the particular category since he was the last one to score a point.

=== 2014 Asian Games ===
The 2014 Asian Games, held in Incheon, South Korea, wasn't as rewarding for Kumar. In the round of 16, Kumar faced off against Sumir Kumar Sah of Nepal and won 4–0. Progressing to the quarter-finals stage, Kumar was up against Mostafajoukar Meisam of Iran but lost 0–4 to the Iranian. With the latter qualifying for the finals, Kumar was given a chance to compete in the repechage round where he met Zhang Feng of China but ultimately crashed out of the tournament, losing 1–3.

== Television ==
Year	Title	Role	Notes
2025	Pati Patni Aur Panga	Contestant	2nd Runner-up
