= Ned McKendry =

Australian swimmer

Personal information
- Full name: Edward McKendry
- Nicknames: "Ned", "Neddy"
- National team: Australia
- Born: 4 July 1992 (age 34) Brisbane, Queensland
- Height: 188 cm (6 ft 2 in)
- Weight: 86 kg (190 lb)

Sport
- Sport: Swimming
- Strokes: Freestyle
- Club: St Peters Western
- Coach: Michael Bohl
Medal record
Men's swimming
Representing Australia
Commonwealth Games
| Gold medal – first place | 2014 Glasgow | 4×200 m freestyle |

Edward "Ned" McKendry (born 4 July 1992) is a competition swimmer who represented Australia at the 2012 Summer Olympics in London. McKendry swam in the preliminary heats and final of the 4×200-metre freestyle relay event as a member of the Australian team, which finished fifth with a time of 7:07.00.
