= Ifeoma Nwoye =

Nigerian wrestler (born 1993)

Ifeoma Christiana Nwoye
Personal information
- Born: 1 May 1993 (age 33)

Sport
- Country: Nigeria
Medal record
Women's freestyle wrestling
Representing Nigeria
Commonwealth Games
Gold medal – first place	2010 Delhi	Freestyle 51kg
Bronze medal – third place	2014 Glasgow	Freestyle 55kg

Ifeoma Nwoye (born 1 May 1993) is a Nigerian wrestler.

Nwoye competed at the Commonwealth Games in 2010, where she won a gold medal in the freestyle 51kg event, and in 2014 where she won a bronze medal in the freestyle 55kg event.
