= Stephanie Inglis =

Scottish judoka (born 1988)

Personal information
- Nationality: Scottish
- Born: 3 November 1988 (age 37) Inverness, Scotland

Sport
- Country: Scotland
- Sport: Judo
- Event: Women's 57 kg
Medal record
Representing Scotland
Women's Judo
Commonwealth Games
Silver medal – second place	2014 Glasgow	Women's 57 kg
- Updated on 7 September 2014

Stephanie Inglis (born 3 November 1988) is a Scottish judoka. She competed for Scotland in the women's 57 kg event at the 2014 Commonwealth Games where she won a silver medal. She suffered a head injury in May 2016 and was unable to return to competitive sport.

== Head injury ==
In 2016, Inglis was on a sabbatical teaching English as a second language in Ha Long, Vietnam. On 10 May 2016, whilst riding as a pillion passenger on a motorbike taxi, Inglis's skirt got caught in the wheel, pulling her off the motorcycle. She was put into a medically-induced coma and treated in an intensive care unit in a hospital in Hanoi. Her sister Stacey later told the BBC News Victoria Derbyshire programme that Inglis was in a coma and "in a very critical state."

The family were told that Inglis did not have the correct travel insurance to cover the cost of her medical treatment in Vietnam. As a result, an online fundraising page was created on the GoFundMe fundraising website to help pay for her treatment.

Having resultantly been moved to a hospital in Bangkok, Thailand, on 6 June 2016, Inglis awakened three weeks after being placed in a medically induced coma, after opening her left eye and grabbing her father's hand in response for the first time since waking up.

On 13 June 2016, Inglis arrived home in Scotland having been flown via air ambulance to continue her recovery. She was able to speak within a few days and to give an interview some weeks later.

She initially had hopes of returning to judo. In July 2017 she conceded that as a consequence of her head injury she would not return to competition.
