= Leith Shankland =

South African swimmer (born 1991)

Personal information
- Born: June 30, 1991 (age 34) Springs, Gauteng, South Africa
- Height: 6 ft 5 in (196 cm)
- Weight: 200 lb (91 kg)

Sport
- Sport: Swimming
Medal record
Representing South Africa
Commonwealth Games
Silver medal – second place	2014 Glasgow	4x100m freestyle relay
Bronze medal – third place	2014 Glasgow	4x100m medley relay
African Games
Gold medal – first place	2011 Maputo	4x100m freestyle relay
Gold medal – first place	2011 Maputo	4x200m freestyle relay

Leith Shankland (born 30 June 1991) is a South African swimmer. He competed in the 4 × 100 metre medley relay event at the 2012 Summer Olympics. He is 6'5" and 200 lbs.

He also competed at the Glasgow 2014 Commonwealth Games. He won a bronze medal in the 4 x 100 metre medley relay and a silver in the 4 x 100m freestyle relay. He also qualified for the 100m freestyle final. At the 2014 Commonwealth Games, he was part of the South African teams that won silver in the men's 4 x 100 m freestyle relay and bronze in the men's 4 x 100 m medley relay.

He is part of the South African freestyle relay team who won the bronze medal in the 4 x 200m freestyle relay in 2014.

Since the start 2022, he has started jujitsu at a club based in Wandsworth, London, Guild Fighters and has recently been awarded a blue belt in December 2022.
