= Mpho Madi =

South African wrestler (born 1988)

Personal information
- Nickname: Queen of the Ring
- Nationality: South African
- Born: 30 May 1988 (age 38) Ermelo, Mpumalanga, South Africa

Sport
- Country: South Africa
- Sport: wrestling
- Club: Tuks Wrestling Club
- Coached by: Nico Coetzee
Medal record
Women's freestyle wrestling
Representing South Africa
Commonwealth Games
Bronze medal – third place	Glasgow 2014	freestyle 53 kg
African Championships in wrestling
Silver medal – second place	2008 Tunis	Women's freestyle 51 kg

Mpho Madi (born 30 May 1988) is a South African female wrestler. She represented South Africa in the 2010 Commonwealth Games and also in the 2014 Commonwealth Games mainly in the over 50 kg categories. Mpho Madi clinched bronze medal in the women's 53kg freestyle event at the 2014 Commonwealth Games.

She is nicknamed as the Queen of the Ring in South Africa as she is regarded as the leading woman sport wrestler in South Africa. Mpho is also the classmate of a Tanzanian swimmer Khalid Rushaka who is also referred to as the Tanzanian Dolphin. She also claimed a bronze medal in the 2008 African Wrestling Championships.

On 13 November 2017, she was elected as the first female Vice President of the Eastern Gauteng Wrestling Association and also became the first black woman to be elected as an executive of a Provincial body in South Africa.
