= Tamerlan Tagziev =

Canadian wrestler (born 1981)

Personal information
- Nationality: Canadian
- Born: September 25, 1981 (age 44) Beslan, Russia
- Home town: Toronto, Ontario, Canada
- Height: 184 cm (6 ft 0 in)
- Weight: 86 kg (190 lb)

Sport
- Sport: Wrestling
Medal record
Men's Wrestling
Representing Canada
Commonwealth Games
Gold medal – first place	2014 Glasgow	86 kg freestyle
Pan American Games
Bronze medal – third place	2015 Toronto	86 kg freestyle

Tamerlan Tagziev (born September 25, 1981) is an Ossetian wrestler competing for Canada.

== Career ==
Tagziev moved to Canada in 2009 and became a citizen in the same year. He won a gold medal in the 86 kg freestyle at the 2014 Commonwealth Games in Glasgow. He was given a four-year ban after testing positive for meldonium on August 29, 2016.
