= Matthew Purssey =

British judoka (born 1981)

Personal information
- Born: 23 February 1981 (age 45)
- Occupation: Judoka

Sport
- Country: United Kingdom
- Sport: Judo
- Weight class: –73 kg, –81 kg, –90 kg

Achievements and titles
- World Champ.: 9th (2003)
- European Champ.: 5th (2006)
Medal record
Representing Scotland
Commonwealth Games
Silver medal – second place	2014 Glasgow	Men's 90 kg
Representing Great Britain
European Junior Championships
Silver medal – second place	2000 Nicosia	–73 kg

Profile at external databases
- IJF: 2363
- JudoInside.com: 8369
- Updated on 17 February 2022

Matthew Purssey (born 23 February 1981) is a British judoka.

== Judo career ==
Purssey is a six times champion of Great Britain, winning titles in the lightweight, half-middleweight and middleweight divisions at the British Judo Championships in 2002, 2004, 2005, 2006, 2008 and 2011.

=== Other achievements ===
Year	Tournament	Place	Weight class
2006	European Judo Championships	5th	Lightweight (73 kg)

- Three time British Open Champion
- 3rd place 2008 World Cup, Drammen, Norway
- 3rd place 2007 Super World Cup, Rotterdam, Netherlands
- 9th place 2003 World Championships, Osaka, Japan

== Personal life ==
His brother Jonathan Purssey also won a British Championships title in 2008.
