= Angele Tomo =

Cameroonian freestyle wrestler

Personal information
- Nationality: Cameroonian
- Born: 11 April 1989 (age 37) Yaounde, Cameroon
- Height: 5 ft 4 in (163 cm)
- Weight: 69 kg (152 lb)

Sport
- Sport: Wrestling
- Event: Women's 69 kg
Medal record
Women's freestyle wrestling
Representing Cameroon
Commonwealth Games
Silver medal – second place	2014 Glasgow	Women's freestyle 69 kg
- Updated on 17 October 2014

Angele Tomo (born 11 April 1989) is a Cameroonian freestyle wrestler. She competed in the women's freestyle 69 kg event at the 2014 Commonwealth Games where she won a silver medal.
