= Zack Piontek =

South African judoka

Personal information
- Nationality: South African
- Born: 27 January 1991 (age 34)
- Occupation: Judoka
- Height: 181 cm (5 ft 11 in)
- Weight: 90 kg (198 lb)

Sport
- Country: South Africa
- Sport: Judo

Profile at external databases
- JudoInside.com: 60487

Zack Piontek (born 27 January 1991) is a South African judoka.

He competed at the 2016 Summer Olympics in Rio de Janeiro, in the men's 90 kg. He was defeated in the round of 32 by Tiago Camilo of Brazil.
