= Swimming at the 2014 Commonwealth Games =

- Venue: Tollcross International Swimming Centre
- Dates: 24–29 July 2014
- Competitors: 426 from 49 nations

Swimming at the 2014 Commonwealth Games was the 20th appearance of Swimming at the Commonwealth Games. The swimming events at the 2014 Commonwealth Games in Glasgow, Scotland, took place from 24 to 29 July at the Tollcross International Swimming Centre.

== Participating nations ==
Nations with swimmers at the Games are (team size in parentheses):

- Antigua and Barbuda (2)
- Australia (59)
- Bahamas (5)
- Bangladesh (2)
- Barbados (3)
- Bermuda (2)
- British Virgin Islands (2)
- Canada (32)
- Cayman Islands (6)
- Cyprus (4)
- England (40)
- Fiji (6)
- Ghana (5)
- Gibraltar (5)
- Grenada (4)
- Guernsey (9)
- Guyana (1)
- India (4)
- Isle of Man (7)
- Jamaica (6)
- Jersey (2)
- Kenya (14)
- Lesotho (1)
- Malawi (2)
- Malaysia (12)
- Maldives (4)
- Mauritius (5)
- Mozambique (4)
- New Zealand (16)
- Northern Ireland (10)
- Pakistan (9)
- Papua New Guinea (6)
- Rwanda (1)
- Saint Helena (1)
- Saint Lucia (2)
- Saint Vincent and the Grenadines (7)
- Samoa (2)
- Scotland (42) (hosts)
- Seychelles (3)
- Singapore (11)
- South Africa (21)
- Sri Lanka (5)
- Swaziland (1)
- Tanzania (4)
- Tonga (3)
- Trinidad and Tobago (2)
- Uganda (3)
- Wales (23)
- Zambia (6)

== Results ==
=== Men's events ===
| Event | Gold | | Silver | | Bronze | |
|---|---|---|---|---|---|---|
| 50 m freestyle | Benjamin Proud; England | 21.92 | Cameron McEvoy; Australia | 22.00 | James Magnussen; Australia | 22.10 |
| 100 m freestyle | James Magnussen; Australia | 48.11 | Cameron McEvoy; Australia | 48.34 | Tommaso D'Orsogna; Australia | 49.04 |
| 100 m freestyle S9 | Rowan Crothers; Australia | 54.58; WR | Matthew Cowdrey; Australia | 56.33 | Brenden Hall; Australia | 56.85 |
| 200 m freestyle | Thomas Fraser-Holmes; Australia | 1:45.08 | Cameron McEvoy; Australia | 1:45.56 | Calum Jarvis; Wales | 1:46.53 |
| 200 m freestyle S14 | Daniel Fox; Australia | 1:57.89 | Thomas Hamer; England | 2:00.27 | Jack Thomas; Wales | 2:01.27 |
| 400 m freestyle | Ryan Cochrane; Canada | 3:43.46; NR | David McKeon; Australia | 3:44.09 | James Guy; England | 3:44.58; NR |
| 1500 m freestyle | Ryan Cochrane; Canada | 14:44.03 | Mack Horton; Australia | 14:48.76 | Daniel Jervis; Wales | 14:55.33 |
| 50 m backstroke | Ben Treffers; Australia | 24.67 | Mitch Larkin; Australia | 24.80 | Liam Tancock; England | 24.98 |
| 100 m backstroke | Chris Walker-Hebborn; England | 53.12; GR | Mitch Larkin; Australia | 53.59 | Josh Beaver; Australia; Liam Tancock; England | 53.75 |
| 200 m backstroke | Mitch Larkin; Australia | 1:55.83 | Josh Beaver; Australia | 1:56.19 | Matson Lawson; Australia | 1:56.63 |
| 50 m breaststroke | Cameron van der Burgh; South Africa | 26.76; GR | Adam Peaty; England | 26.78; ER | Christian Sprenger; Australia | 27.46 |
| 100 m breaststroke | Adam Peaty; England | 58.94; GR, NR | Cameron van der Burgh; South Africa | 59.28 | Ross Murdoch; Scotland | 59.47 |
| 200 m breaststroke | Ross Murdoch; Scotland | 2:07.30; CR | Michael Jamieson; Scotland | 2:08.40 | Andrew Willis; England | 2:09.87 |
| 50 m butterfly | Benjamin Proud; England | 22.93; GR, NR | Roland Schoeman; South Africa | 23.13 | Chad le Clos; South Africa | 23.36 |
| 100 m butterfly | Chad le Clos; South Africa | 51.29; GR | Joseph Schooling; Singapore | 51.69; NR | Adam Barrett; England | 51.93 |
| 200 m butterfly | Chad le Clos; South Africa | 1:55.07; GR | Grant Irvine; Australia | 1:56.34 | Sebastien Rousseau; South Africa | 1.56:43 |
| 200 m individual medley | Daniel Tranter; Australia | 1:57.83; GR | Daniel Wallace; Scotland | 1:58.72 | Chad le Clos; South Africa | 1:58.85 |
| 200 m individual medley SM8 | Oliver Hynd; England | 2:22.86 | Jesse Aungles; Australia | 2:31.25 | Blake Cochrane; Australia | 2:32.72 |
| 400 m individual medley | Daniel Wallace; Scotland | 4:11.20 | Thomas Fraser-Holmes; Australia | 4:12.04 | Sebastien Rousseau; South Africa | 4:13.09 |
| 4 × 100 m freestyle relay | Australia; Tommaso D'Orsogna (49.26); Matthew Abood (48.77); James Magnussen (47.49); Cameron McEvoy (47.92); Ned McKendry^{[a]} Kenneth To^{[a]} Jayden Hadler^{[a]} | 3:13.44; GR | South Africa; Chad le Clos (48.53); Roland Schoeman (48.78); Leith Shankland (48.14); Caydon Muller (49.72); Clayton Jimmie^{[a]} Calvyn Justus^{[a]} | 3:15.17 | England; Adam Brown (49.47); James Disney-May (48.81); Adam Barrett (49.04); Benjamin Proud (49.05); Lewis Coleman^{[a]} Chris Walker-Hebborn^{[a]} | 3:16.37 |
| 4 × 200 m freestyle relay | Australia; Cameron McEvoy (1:48.10); David McKeon (1:45.82); Ned McKendry (1:48.28); Thomas Fraser-Holmes (1:45.18); Mack Horton^{[a]} | 7.07.38; GR | Scotland; Daniel Wallace (1:47.37); Stephen Milne (1:47.17); Duncan Scott (1:47.18); Robert Renwick (1:47.46); Jak Scott^{[a]} Gareth Mills^{[a]} Cameron Brodie^{[a]} Craig Hamilton^{[a]} | 7.09.18 | South Africa; Devon Brown (1:47.49); Chad le Clos (1:47.13); Sebastien Rousseau (1:47.03); Dylan Bosch (1:48.71); Calvyn Justus^{[a]} | 7.10.36 |
| 4 × 100 m medley relay | England; Chris Walker-Hebborn (53.40); Adam Peaty (58.59); Adam Barrett (51.02); Adam Brown (48.50); Liam Tancock^{[a]} James Wilby^{[a]} James Guy^{[a]} James Disney-May^{[a]} | 3:31.51; GR | Australia; Mitch Larkin (53.59); Christian Sprenger (59.64); Jayden Hadler (51.81); James Magnussen (47.17); Joshua Beaver^{[a]} Kenneth To^{[a]} Tommaso D'Orsogna^{[a]} Cameron McEvoy^{[a]} | 3:32.21 | South Africa; Sebastien Rousseau (55.33); Cameron van der Burgh (59.40); Chad le Clos (51.05); Leith Shankland (48.69); Dylan Bosch^{[a]} Clayton Jimmie^{[a]} | 3:34.47 |
AF African record | AM Americas record | AS Asian record | ER European record | OC Oceania record CR Commonwealth record | GR Commonwealth Games record | WR World record | NR National record (Any world record is necessarily also a Commonwealth Games, Commonwealth, area, and national record. Area records (for continental regions) are also national records.)

^{a} Swimmers who participated in the heats only and received medals.

=== Women's events ===
| Event | Gold | | Silver | | Bronze | |
|---|---|---|---|---|---|---|
| 50 m freestyle | Francesca Halsall; England | 23.96; CR | Cate Campbell; Australia | 24.00 | Bronte Campbell; Australia | 24.20 |
| 100 m freestyle | Cate Campbell; Australia | 52.68; GR | Bronte Campbell; Australia | 52.86 | Emma McKeon; Australia | 53.61 |
| 100 m freestyle S8 | Maddison Elliott; Australia | 1:05.32; WR | Stephanie Slater; England | 1:05.73 | Lakeisha Patterson; Australia | 1:08.98 |
| 200 m freestyle | Emma McKeon; Australia | 1:55.57; GR, OC | Siobhan-Marie O'Connor; England | 1:55.82 | Bronte Barratt; Australia | 1:56.62 |
| 400 m freestyle | Lauren Boyle; New Zealand | 4:04.47; GR | Jazmin Carlin; Wales | 4:05.16 | Bronte Barratt; Australia | 4:06.02 |
| 800 m freestyle | Jazmin Carlin; Wales | 8:18.11; GR | Lauren Boyle; New Zealand | 8:20.59 | Brittany MacLean; Canada | 8:20.91; NR |
| 50 m backstroke | Georgia Davies; Wales | 27.56; GR, NR | Lauren Quigley; England | 27.69 | Brooklynn Snodgrass; Canada | 27.97; NR |
| 100 m backstroke | Emily Seebohm; Australia | 59.37; GR | Georgia Davies; Wales | 59.58 | Belinda Hocking; Australia | 59.93 |
| 200 m backstroke | Belinda Hocking; Australia | 2:07.24; GR | Emily Seebohm; Australia | 2:08.51 | Hilary Caldwell; Canada | 2:08.55 |
| 50 m breaststroke | Leiston Pickett; Australia | 30.59 | Alia Atkinson; Jamaica | 30.67 | Corrie Scott; Scotland | 30.75 |
| 100 m breaststroke | Sophie Taylor; England | 1:06.35; NR | Lorna Tonks; Australia | 1:07.34 | Alia Atkinson; Jamaica | 1:08.14 |
| 100 m breaststroke SB9 | Sophie Pascoe; New Zealand | 1:19.36 | Madeleine Scott; Australia | 1:21.38 | Erraid Davies; Scotland | 1:21.68 |
| 200 m breaststroke | Taylor McKeown; Australia | 2:22.36 | Sally Hunter; Australia | 2:23.33 | Molly Renshaw; England | 2:25.00 |
| 50 m butterfly | Francesca Halsall; England | 25.20; CR | Arianna Vanderpool-Wallace; Bahamas | 25.53; NR | Brittany Elmslie; Australia | 25.91 |
| 100 m butterfly | Katerine Savard; Canada | 57.40; GR | Siobhan-Marie O'Connor; England | 57.45 | Emma McKeon; Australia | 57.66 |
| 200 m butterfly | Audrey Lacroix; Canada | 2:07.61 | Aimee Willmott; England | 2:08.07 | Madeline Groves; Australia | 2:08.44 |
| 200 m individual medley | Siobhan-Marie O'Connor; England | 2:08.21; GR | Alicia Coutts; Australia | 2:10.30 | Hannah Miley; Scotland | 2:10.74 |
| 200 m individual medley SM10 | Sophie Pascoe; New Zealand | 2:27.74 | Katherine Downie; Australia | 2:31.98 | Aurelie Rivard; Canada | 2:32.09 |
| 400 m individual medley | Hannah Miley; Scotland | 4:31.76; GR | Aimee Willmott; England | 4:33.01 | Keryn McMaster; Australia | 4:36.35 |
| 4 × 100 m freestyle relay | Australia; Bronte Campbell (53.15) GR; Melanie Schlanger (52.76); Emma McKeon (52.91); Cate Campbell (52.16); Madeline Groves^{[b]} Brittany Elmslie^{[b]} Alicia Coutts^{[b]} | 3:30.98; WR | England; Siobhan-Marie O'Connor (54.06); Francesca Halsall (53.17); Amy Smith (53.88); Rebecca Turner (54.61); Lauren Quigley^{[b]} Jess Lloyd^{[b]} Amelia Maughan^{[b]} | 3:35.72; NR | Canada; Victoria Poon (55.29); Sandrine Mainville (54.69); Michelle Williams (54.66); Alyson Ackman (55.36) | 3:40.00 |
| 4 × 200 m freestyle relay | Australia; Emma McKeon (1:56.01); Alicia Coutts (1:59.34); Brittany Elmslie (1:57.89); Bronte Barratt (1:56.66); Madeline Groves^{[b]} Remy Fairweather^{[b]} | 7:49.90; GR | Canada; Samantha Cheverton (1:57.99); Brittany MacLean (1:56.87); Alyson Ackman (1:58.43); Emily Overholt (1:58.38) | 7:51.67 | England; Siobhan-Marie O'Connor (1:57.19); Amelia Maughan (1:59.53); Ellie Faulkner (1:58.08); Rebecca Turner (1:57.65); Jess Lloyd^{[b]} Aimee Willmott^{[b]} | 7:52.45 |
| 4 × 100 m medley relay | Australia; Emily Seebohm (59.41); Lorna Tonks (1:08.28); Emma McKeon (56.95); Cate Campbell (51.59); Belinda Hocking^{[b]} Sally Hunter^{[b]} Alicia Coutts^{[b]} Bronte Campbell^{[b]} | 3:56.23; GR | England; Lauren Quigley (1:00.17); Sophie Taylor (1:06.39); Siobhan-Marie O'Connor (57.89); Francesca Halsall (52.58); Elizabeth Simmonds^{[b]} Molly Renshaw^{[b]} Rachael Kelly^{[b]} Amy Smith^{[b]} | 3:57.03 =NR | Canada; Sinead Russell (59.94); Tera van Beilen (1:08.01); Katerine Savard (57.72); Sandrine Mainville (54.90); Kierra Smith^{[b]} Audrey Lacroix^{[b]} Michelle Williams^{[b]} | 4:00.57 |
AF African record | AM Americas record | AS Asian record | ER European record | OC Oceania record CR Commonwealth record | GR Commonwealth Games record | WR World record | NR National record (Any world record is necessarily also a Commonwealth Games, Commonwealth, area, and national record. Area records (for continental regions) are also national records.)

^{b} Swimmers who participated in the heats only and received medals.

== Swimming medal summary ==
* Host nation (Scotland)

| Rank | Nation | Gold | Silver | Bronze | Total |
|---|---|---|---|---|---|
| 1 | Australia | 19 | 21 | 17 | 57 |
| 2 | England | 10 | 10 | 8 | 28 |
| 3 | Canada | 4 | 1 | 6 | 11 |
| 4 | South Africa | 3 | 3 | 6 | 12 |
| 5 | Scotland* | 3 | 3 | 4 | 10 |
| 6 | New Zealand | 3 | 1 | 0 | 4 |
| 7 | Wales | 2 | 2 | 3 | 7 |
| 8 | Jamaica | 0 | 1 | 1 | 2 |
| 9 | Bahamas | 0 | 1 | 0 | 1 |
| 9 | Singapore | 0 | 1 | 0 | 1 |
| Totals (10 entries) | | 44 | 44 | 45 | 133 |
