= Lalita Sehrawat =

Indian wrestler (born 1994)

Personal information
- Nationality: Indian
- Born: 14 June 1994 (age 32) Hisar, Haryana, India
- Occupation: Wrestler

Sport
- Country: India
- Sport: Wrestling
- Event: Freestyle
Medal record
Representing India
Women's Freestyle Wrestling
Commonwealth Games
Silver medal – second place	2014 Glasgow	53 kg
Asian Championships
Bronze medal – third place	2015 Doha	55 kg

Lalita Sehrawat (born 14 June 1994) is an Indian wrestler. She represented India in the women's freestyle 53 kg category at the 2014 Commonwealth Games in Glasgow in which she won the silver medal.
