= Dylan Bosch =

South African swimmer (born 1993)

Personal information
- Nationality: South African
- Born: 17 July 1993 (age 33)
- Height: 178 cm (5 ft 10 in)
- Weight: 75 kg (165 lb)

Sport
- Sport: Swimming
- Strokes: Freestyle
- College team: University of Michigan
Medal record
Men's swimming
Representing South Africa
Commonwealth Games
Bronze medal – third place	2014 Glasgow	4×200 m freestyle
Bronze medal – third place	2014 Glasgow	4×100 m medley

Dylan Bosch (born 17 July 1993) is a South African swimmer. He competed in the men's 4 × 200 metre freestyle relay event at the 2016 Summer Olympics. The team finished in 11th place in the heats and did not advance.
