= Sebastien Rousseau =

South African swimmer (born 1990)

Personal information
- Full name: Sebastien Daniel Rousseau
- National team: South Africa
- Born: 10 September 1990 (age 35) Sandton, South Africa
- Height: 1.91 m (6 ft 3 in)
- Weight: 88 kg (194 lb)

Sport
- Sport: Swimming
- Strokes: Freestyle, butterfly, medley
- Club: Vineyard Swim Club; Gator Swim Club
- College team: University of Florida (U.S.)
- Coach: Karoly von Toros (South Africa); Gregg Troy (U.S.)

Sebastien Daniel Rousseau (born 10 September 1990) is a competition swimmer who has represented South Africa in three Summer Olympics and other international swimming championships. He is married to Holly.

== Career ==
Rousseau is the South African record holder in the 400m Individual Medley (LCM) with a time of 4:11.11, which he achieved while winning the event at the 2013 U.S. Open. He competed in the 2009 and 2011 World Swimming Championships, in Rome and Shanghai respectively. He competed in the 2010 and 2014 Commonwealth Games, in Delhi and Glasgow respectively. He competed in the 4 × 200 metre freestyle relay event at the 2008 Summer Olympics and the 4 × 200 metre freestyle relay event at the 2012 Summer Olympics. At the 2014 Commonwealth Games, he won bronze medals in the 400m individual medley, 200m butterfly, 4 × 200 m freestyle relay and 4 × 100 m medley relay. At the 2016 Summer Olympics, he competed in the 400 m individual medley where he finished 21st in the heats with a time of 4:18.72 and did not qualify for the final. He also competed in the 200 m butterfly where he finished 23rd in the heats with a time of 1:57.33 and did not qualify for the semifinals. He was part of South Africa's 4 × 200 m freestyle relay team that finished 10th in the heats and did not qualify for the final. Rousseau retired from competitive swimming following the Rio Olympic Games in 2016.
