= Chronological summary of the 2014 Commonwealth Games =

The 2014 Commonwealth Games (officially the XX Commonwealth Games) were held in Glasgow, Scotland, from 23 July to 3 August 2014.

It is the largest multi-sport event ever held in Scotland with around 4,950 athletes from 71 countries and territories competing in 18 different sports, although the country previously hosted the 1970 and 1986 Commonwealth Games in Edinburgh. Over the last 10 years, however, Glasgow and Scotland had staged World, Commonwealth, European, or British events in all 18 sports proposed for the 2014 Commonwealth Games, including the World Badminton Championships in 1997.

This page contains a chronological summary of major events from the Games.

== Calendar ==
OC	Opening ceremony	●	Event competitions	1	Gold medal events	CC	Closing ceremony

July/August 2014		July									August			Events
July/August 2014		23rd Wed	24th Thu	25th Fri	26th Sat	27th Sun	28th Mon	29th Tue	30th Wed	31st Thu	1st Fri	2nd Sat	3rd Sun	Events
Ceremonies		OC											CC	—
Aquatics	Diving								3	2	3	2		54
Aquatics	Swimming		6	8	7	7	8	8						54
Athletics						4	7	7	7	9	7	9		50
Badminton			●	●	●	●	1	●	●	●	●	●	5	6
Boxing				●	●	●	●	●	●	●	●	13		11
Cycling	Mountain biking							2						23
Cycling	Road cycling									2			2	23
Cycling	Track cycling		4	4	5	4								23
Gymnastics	Artistic						●	2	2	5	5			20
Gymnastics	Rhythmic		1	1	4									20
Hockey			●	●	●	●	●	●	●	●	●	1	1	2
Judo			5	4	5									14
Lawn bowls			●	●	1	2	2	●	●	2	3			10
Netball			●	●	●	●	●	●	●	●	●	●	1	1
Rugby sevens					●	1								1
Shooting				3	5	2	4	5						19
Squash			●	●	●	●	2	●	●	●	●	1	2	5
Table tennis			●	●	●	1	1	●	●	●	2	3		7
Triathlon			2		1									3
Weightlifting			2	2	2	2	2	2	2	1		4		19
Wrestling								5	5	4				14
Daily medal events			20	22	30	23	27	31	19	25	20	33	11	261
Cumulative total			20	42	72	95	122	153	172	197	217	250	261	261
July/August 2014		23rd Wed	24th Thu	25th Fri	26th Sat	27th Sun	28th Mon	29th Tue	30th Wed	31st Thu	1st Fri	2nd Sat	3rd Sun	Total events
July/August 2014		July									August			Total events

== Day 0 – Wednesday 23 July ==
The Opening Ceremony was held at 21:00 at Celtic Park in Glasgow, Scotland.

== Day 1 – Thursday 24 July ==
Sports during Day 1 included cycling, gymnastics, judo, swimming, triathlon and weightlifting.

Gold medallists
Sport	Event	Competitor(s)	NOC	Rec	Ref
Cycling	Men's team sprint	Edward Dawkins; Ethan Mitchell; Sam Webster	New Zealand		
Cycling	Men's team pursuit	Jack Bobridge; Luke Davison; Alex Edmondson; Glenn O'Shea	Australia		
Cycling	Women's tandem sprint B	Sophie Thornhill; Helen Scott (pilot)	England		
Gymnastics	Women's rhythmic team all-around	Annabelle Kovacs; Maria Kitkarska; Patricia Bezzoubenko	Canada		
Judo	Women's 48 kg	Kimberley Renicks	Scotland		
Judo	Men's 60 kg	Ashley McKenzie	England		
Judo	Women's 52 kg	Louise Renicks	Scotland		
Judo	Men's 66 kg	Colin Oates	England		
Judo	Women's 57 kg	Nekoda Davis	England		
Swimming	Women's 400 metre individual medley	Hannah Miley	Scotland	GR	
Swimming	Men's 400 metre freestyle	Ryan Cochrane	Canada		
Swimming	Women's 200 metre freestyle	Emma McKeon	Australia	GR	
Swimming	Men's 100 metre freestyle S9	Rowan Crothers	Australia	WR	
Swimming	Men's 200 metre breaststroke	Ross Murdoch	Scotland	GR	
Swimming	Women's 4 × 100 metre freestyle relay	Bronte Campbell; Melanie Schlanger; Emma McKeon; Cate Campbell	Australia	WR	
Triathlon	Women's	Jodie Stimpson	England		
Triathlon	Men's	Alistair Brownlee	England		
Weightlifting	Men's 56 kg	Sukhen Dey	India		
Weightlifting	Women's 48 kg	Sanjita Khumukchan	India		

== Day 2 – Friday 25 July ==
Sports during Day 2 included cycling, gymnastics, judo, shooting, swimming and weightlifting.

Gold medallists
Sport	Event	Competitor(s)	NOC	Rec	Ref
Cycling	Men's tandem 1km time trial B	Neil Fachie; Craig MacLean (Pilot)	Scotland		
Cycling	Women's individual pursuit	Joanna Rowsell	England		
Cycling	Men's sprint	Sam Webster	New Zealand		
Cycling	Men's individual pursuit	Jack Bobridge	Australia		
Gymnastics	Women's rhythmic individual all-around	Patricia Bezzoubenko	Canada		
Judo	Women's −63 kg	Sarah Clark	Scotland		
Judo	Men's 73 kg	Daniel Williams	England		
Judo	Women's 70 kg	Megan Fletcher	England		
Judo	Men's 81 kg	Owen Livesey	England		
Shooting	Women's 10 metre air pistol	Teo Shun Xi	Singapore		
Shooting	Men's 10 metre air rifle	Abhinav Bindra	India		
Shooting	Women's skeet	Laura Coles	Australia		
Swimming	Men's 50 metre butterfly	Benjamin Proud	England	GR	
Swimming	Women's 50 metre breaststroke	Leiston Pickett	Australia		
Swimming	Men's 200 metre freestyle	Thomas Fraser-Holmes	Australia		
Swimming	Men's 400 metre individual medley	Daniel Wallace	Scotland		
Swimming	Women's 100 metre freestyle S8	Maddison Elliott	Australia	WR	
Swimming	Men's 100 metre backstroke	Chris Walker-Hebborn	England	GR	
Swimming	Women's 100 metre butterfly	Katerine Savard	Canada	GR	
Swimming	Men's 4 × 100 metre freestyle relay	Tommaso D'Orsogna; Matt Abood; James Magnussen; Cameron McEvoy	Australia	GR	
Weightlifting	Women's 53 kg	Dika Toua	Papua New Guinea	GR	
Weightlifting	Men's 62 kg	Dimitris Minasidis	Cyprus		

== Day 3 – Saturday 26 July ==
Sports during Day 3 included cycling, gymnastics, judo, lawn bowls, shooting, swimming, triathlon and weightlifting.

Gold medallists
Sport	Event	Competitor(s)	NOC	Rec	Ref
Cycling	Women's scratch race	Annette Edmondson	Australia		
Cycling	Men's tandem sprint B	Neil Fachie; Craig MacLean (Pilot)	Scotland		
Cycling	Men's 1 km time trial	Scott Sunderland	Australia		
Cycling	Men's points race	Thomas Scully	New Zealand		
Gymnastics	Women's rhythmic individual hoop	Patricia Bezzoubenko	Canada		
Gymnastics	Women's rhythmic individual ball	Patricia Bezzoubenko	Canada		
Gymnastics	Women's rhythmic individual clubs	Patricia Bezzoubenko	Canada		
Gymnastics	Women's rhythmic individual ribbon	Francesca Jones	Wales		
Judo	Men's 90 kg	Zack Piontek	South Africa		
Judo	Women's 78 kg	Natalie Powell	Wales		
Judo	Men's −100 kg	Euan Burton	Scotland		
Judo	Women's +78 kg	Sarah Adlington	Scotland		
Judo	Men's +100 kg	Christopher Sherrington	Scotland		
Lawn bowls	Mixed para-sport pairs	Gwen Nel; Annatjie van Rooyen; Geoff Newcombe; Herman Scholtz	South Africa		
Shooting	Queen's prize pairs	David Luckman; Parag Patel	England		
Shooting	Men's 10 metre air pistol	Daniel Repacholi	Australia		
Shooting	Men's skeet	Georgios Achilleos	Cyprus		
Shooting	Women's 10 metre air rifle	Apurvi Chandela	India		
Shooting	Women's 25 metre pistol	Rahi Sarnobat	India		
Swimming	Men's 200 metre butterfly	Chad le Clos	South Africa		
Swimming	Women's 50 metre freestyle	Francesca Halsall	England	GR	
Swimming	Men's 200 metre freestyle S14	Daniel Fox	Australia		
Swimming	Women's 200 metre breaststroke	Taylor McKeown	Australia		
Swimming	Women's 100 metre backstroke	Emily Seebohm	Australia		
Swimming	Men's 100 metre breaststroke	Adam Peaty	England		
Swimming	Women's 4 × 200 metre freestyle relay	Emma McKeon; Alicia Coutts; Brittany Elmslie; Bronte Barratt	Australia	GR	
Triathlon	Mixed relay	Vicky Holland; Jonathan Brownlee; Jodie Stimpson; Alistair Brownlee	England		
Weightlifting	Women's 58 kg	Zoe Smith	England		
Weightlifting	Men's 69 kg	Mohammed Hafifi Mansor	Malaysia		

== Day 4 – Sunday 27 July ==
Sports during Day 4 included athletics, cycling, lawn bowls, rugby sevens, shooting, swimming and weightlifting.

Gold medallists
Sport	Event	Competitor(s)	NOC	Rec	Ref
Athletics	Men's marathon	Michael Shelley	Australia		
Athletics	Women's marathon	Flomena Cheyech Daniel	Kenya		
Athletics	Women's long jump (T37/38)	Jodi Elkington	Australia		
Athletics	Men's 5000 metres	Caleb Mwangangi Ndiku	Kenya		
Cycling	Women's tandem 1km time trial B	Sophie Thornhill; Helen Scott(pilot)	England	GR	
Cycling	Women's sprint	Stephanie Morton	Australia	GR	
Cycling	Women's points race	Laura Trott	England		
Cycling	Men's scratch race	Shane Archbold	New Zealand		
Cycling	Men's Keirin	Matthew Glaetzer	Australia		
Lawn bowls	Women's fours	Esme Steyn; Santjie Steyn; Susan Nel; Tracy-Lee Botha	South Africa		
Lawn bowls	Women's singles	Colleen Piketh	South Africa		
Rugby sevens	Men's	South Africa national rugby sevens team	South Africa		
Shooting	Women's double trap	Charlotte Kerwood	England		
Shooting	Men's double trap	Steven Scott	England		
Swimming	Women's 200 metre backstroke	Belinda Hocking	Australia	GR	
Swimming	Men's 100 metre freestyle	James Magnussen	Australia		
Swimming	Women's 100 metre breaststroke SB9	Sophie Pascoe	New Zealand		
Swimming	Women's 200 metre individual medley	Siobhan-Marie O'Connor	England	GR	
Swimming	Men's 50 metre backstroke	Ben Treffers	Australia		
Swimming	Women's 50 metre butterfly	Francesca Halsall	England	GR	
Swimming	Men's 4 × 200 metre freestyle relay	Cameron McEvoy; David McKeon; Ned McKendry; Thomas Fraser-Holmes	Australia	GR	
Table tennis	Women's team	Feng Tianwei; Yu Mengyu; Isabelle Li; Lin Ye; Zhou Yihan	Singapore		
Weightlifting	Women's 63 kg	Olauwatoyin Adesanmi	Nigeria		
Weightlifting	Men's 77 kg	Sathish Sivalingam	India	GR	

== Day 5 – Monday 28 July ==
Sports during Day 5 included athletics, badminton, lawn bowls, shooting, squash, swimming and weightlifting.

Gold medallists
Sport	Event	Competitor(s)	NOC	Rec	Ref
Athletics	Men's discus throw (F42/44)	Dan Greaves	England		
Athletics	Women's hammer throw	Sultana Frizell	Canada		
Athletics	Men's shot put	O'Dayne Richards	Jamaica		
Athletics	Women's 100 metres (T12)	Libby Clegg	Scotland		
Athletics	Men's 100 metres (T37)	Fanie van der Merwe	South Africa		
Athletics	Women's 100 metres	Blessing Okagbare	Nigeria	GR	
Athletics	Men's 100 metres	Kemar Bailey-Cole	Jamaica		
Badminton	Mixed team	Chan Peng Soon; Chong Wei Feng; Daren Liew; Goh V Shem; Lai Pei Jing; Lim Yin Loo; Tan Wee Kiong; Tee Jing Yi; Vivian Hoo Kah Mun; Woon Khe Wei	Malaysia		
Lawn bowls	Men's pairs	Alex Marshall; Paul Foster	Scotland		
Lawn bowls	Men's triples	Prince Neluonde; Petrus Breitenbach; Bobby Donnelly	South Africa		
Shooting	Men's 50 metre pistol	Jitu Rai	India		
Shooting	Men's 50 metre rifle prone	Warren Potent	Australia		
Shooting	Women's trap	Laetisha Scanlan	Australia		
Shooting	Women's 50 metre rifle prone	Sally Johnston	New Zealand		
Squash	Women's singles	Nicol David	Malaysia		
Squash	Men's singles	Nick Matthew	England		
Swimming	Men's 200 metre backstroke	Mitch Larkin	Australia		
Swimming	Women's 800 metre freestyle	Jazz Carlin	Wales	GR	
Swimming	Men's 200 metre individual medley SM8	Oliver Hynd	England		
Swimming	Women's 100 metre breaststroke	Sophie Taylor	England		
Swimming	Women's 200 metre butterfly	Audrey Lacroix	Canada		
Swimming	Men's 50 metre breaststroke	Cameron van der Burgh	South Africa	GR	
Swimming	Women's 100 metre freestyle	Cate Campbell	Australia	GR	
Swimming	Men's 100 metre butterfly	Chad le Clos	South Africa	GR	
Table tennis	Men's team	Clarence Chew; Li Hu; Gao Ning; Yang Zi; Zhan Jian	Singapore		
Weightlifting	Women's 69 kg	Marie Fegue	Cameroon		
Weightlifting	Men's 85 kg	Richard Patterson	New Zealand		

== Day 6 – Tuesday 29 July ==
Sports during Day 6 included athletics, cycling, gymnastics, shooting, swimming, wrestling and weightlifting.

Gold medalists
Sport	Event	Competitor(s)	NOC	Rec	Ref
Athletics	Women's triple jump	Kimberly Williams	Jamaica		
Athletics	Women's 10,000 metres	Joyce Chepkirui	Kenya		
Athletics	Women's 400 metres	Stephanie McPherson	Jamaica		
Athletics	Men's hammer throw	Jim Steacy	Canada		
Athletics	Men's 110 metres hurdles	Andrew Riley	Jamaica		
Athletics	Men's decathlon	Damian Warner	Canada		
Athletics	Women's 1500 metres	Faith Chepngetich Kipyegon	Kenya		
Cycling	Women's cross-country	Catharine Pendrel	Canada		
Cycling	Men's cross-country	Anton Cooper	New Zealand		
Gymnastics	Men's artistic team all-around	Sam Oldham; Louis Smith; Kristian Thomas; Max Whitlock; Nile Wilson	England		
Gymnastics	Women's artistic team all-around	Ruby Harrold; Kelly Simm; Hannah Whelan; Claudia Fragapane; Becky Downie	England		
Shooting	Queen's prize individual	David Luckman	England	GR	
Shooting	Men's 25 metre rapid fire pistol	David J. Chapman	Australia		
Shooting	Men's trap	Adam Vella	Australia		
Shooting	Men's 50 metre rifle three positions	Daniel Rivers	England		
Shooting	Women's 50 metre rifle three positions	Jasmine Ser	Singapore	GR	
Swimming	Women's 400 metre freestyle	Lauren Boyle	New Zealand	GR	
Swimming	Men's 50 metre freestyle	Benjamin Proud	England		
Swimming	Women's 50 metre backstroke	Georgia Davies	Wales	GR	
Swimming	Men's 200 metre individual medley	Daniel Tranter	Australia	GR	
Swimming	Women's 200 metre individual medley SM10	Sophie Pascoe	New Zealand		
Swimming	Men's 1500 metre freestyle	Ryan Cochrane	Canada		
Swimming	Women's 4 × 100 metre medley relay	Emily Seebohm; Lorna Tonks; Emma McKeon; Cate Campbell	Australia	GR	
Swimming	Men's 4 × 100 metre medley relay	Chris Walker-Hebborn; Adam Peaty; Adam Barrett; Adam Brown	England	GR	
Weightlifting	Women's 75 kg	Marie-Eve Beauchemin-Nadeau	Canada		
Weightlifting	Men's 94 kg	Steven Kukuna Kari	Papua New Guinea		
Wrestling	Men's freestyle 57 kg	Amit Amit Kumar	India		
Wrestling	Women's freestyle 48 kg	Vinesh Phogat	India		
Wrestling	Men's freestyle 74 kg	Sushil Kumar	India		
Wrestling	Women's freestyle 75 kg	Erica Wiebe	Canada		
Wrestling	Men's freestyle 125 kg	Korey Jarvis	Canada		

== Day 7 – Wednesday 30 July ==
Sports during Day 7 included athletics, diving, gymnastics, weightlifting, wrestling

Gold medalists
Sport	Event	Competitor(s)	NOC	Rec	Ref
Athletics	Men's high jump	Derek Drouin	Canada		
Athletics	Men's long jump	Greg Rutherford	England		
Athletics	Women's 3000 metres steeplechase	Purity Kirui	Kenya		
Athletics	Women's heptathlon	Brianne Theisen-Eaton	Canada		
Athletics	Women's javelin throw	Kim Mickle	Australia	GR	
Athletics	Men's 400 metres	Kirani James	Grenada	GR	
Athletics	Women's shot put	Valerie Adams	New Zealand		
Diving	Women's synchronised 10 metre platform	Meaghan Benfeito; Roseline Filion	Canada		
Diving	Men's 1 metre springboard	Jack Laugher	England		
Diving	Women's synchronised 3 metre springboard	Alicia Blagg; Rebecca Gallantree	England		
Gymnastics	Men's artistic individual all-around	Max Whitlock	England		
Gymnastics	Women's artistic individual all-around	Claudia Fragapane	England		
Weightlifting	Women's +75 kg	Maryam Usman	Nigeria		
Weightlifting	Men's 105 kg	David Katoatau	Kiribati		
Wrestling	Women's freestyle 53 kg	Odunayo Adekuoroye	Nigeria		
Wrestling	Men's freestyle 61 kg	David Tremblay	Canada		
Wrestling	Women's freestyle 58 kg	Aminat Adeniyi	Nigeria		
Wrestling	Men's freestyle 97 kg	Arjun Gill	Canada		
Wrestling	Women's freestyle 69 kg	Dori Yeats	Canada		

== Day 8 – Thursday 31 July ==
Sports during Day 8 included athletics, cycling, diving, gymnastics, lawn bowls, weightlifting, wrestling

Gold medalists
Sport	Event	Competitor(s)	NOC	Rec	Ref
Athletics	Men's discus throw	Vikas Shive Gowda	India		
Athletics	Women's long jump	Ese Brume	Nigeria		
Athletics	Women's 1500 metres (T54)	Angela Ballard	Australia		
Athletics	Men's 1500 metres (T54)	David Weir	England		
Athletics	Men's 800 metres	Nijel Amos	Botswana		
Athletics	Men's 400 metres hurdles	Cornel Fredericks	South Africa		
Athletics	Women's 400 metres hurdles	Kaliese Spencer	Jamaica		
Athletics	Women's 200 metres	Blessing Okagbare	Nigeria		
Athletics	Men's 200 metres	Rasheed Dwyer	Jamaica		
Cycling	Women's road time trial	Linda Villumsen	New Zealand		
Cycling	Men's road time trial	Alex Dowsett	England		
Diving	Men's 3 metre springboard	Ooi Tze Liang	Malaysia		
Diving	Women's 10 metre platform	Meaghan Benfeito	Canada		
Gymnastics	Men's floor	Max Whitlock	England		
Gymnastics	Women's vault	Claudia Fragapane	England		
Gymnastics	Men's pommel horse	Daniel Keatings	Scotland		
Gymnastics	Women's uneven bars	Rebecca Downie	England		
Gymnastics	Men's rings	Scott Morgan	Canada		
Lawn bowls	Open para-sport triples B6/7/8	Deon Van De Vyver; Roger Hagerty; Lobban Derrick	South Africa		
Lawn bowls	Women's triples	Sophie Tolchard; Ellen Falkner; Sian Gordon	England		
Weightlifting	Men's +105 kg	George Kobaladze	Canada	GR	
Wrestling	Women's freestyle 55 kg	Babita Kumari	India		
Wrestling	Men's freestyle 65 kg	Yogeshwar Dutt	India		
Wrestling	Women's freestyle 63 kg	Danielle Lappage	Canada		
Wrestling	Men's freestyle 86 kg	Tamerlan Tagziev	Canada		

== Day 9 – Friday 1 August ==
Sports during Day 9 included athletics, diving, gymnastics, lawn bowls, table tennis

Gold medalists
Sport	Event	Competitor(s)	NOC	Rec	Ref
Athletics	Women's high jump	Eleanor Patterson	Australia		
Athletics	Men's pole vault	Steven Lewis	England		
Athletics	Women's discus throw	Dani Samuels	Australia		
Athletics	Men's 3000 metres steeplechase	Jonathan Ndiku	Kenya	GR	
Athletics	Men's 10,000 metres	Moses Kipsiro	Uganda		
Athletics	Women's 800 metres	Eunice Sum	Kenya		
Athletics	Women's 100 metres hurdles	Sally Pearson	Australia		
Diving	Men's synchronised 3 metre springboard	Jack Laugher; Chris Mears	England		
Diving	Women's 1 metre springboard	Jennifer Abel	Canada		
Diving	Men's synchronised 10 metre platform	Domonic Bedggood; Matthew Mitcham	Australia		
Gymnastics	Men's vault	Scott Morgan	Canada		
Gymnastics	Women's balance beam	Ellie Black	Canada		
Gymnastics	Men's parallel bars	Daniel Purvis	Scotland		
Gymnastics	Women's floor	Claudia Fragapane	England		
Gymnastics	Men's horizontal bar	Nile Wilson	England		
Lawn bowls	Women's pairs	Tracy-Lee Botha; Colleen Piketh	South Africa		
Lawn bowls	Men's fours	David Peacock; Neil Speirs; Paul Foster; Alex Marshall	Scotland		
Lawn bowls	Men's singles	Darren Burnett	Scotland		
Table tennis	Women's singles	Feng Tianwei	Singapore		
Table tennis	Men's doubles	Gao Ning; Li Hu	Singapore		

== Day 10 – Saturday 2 August ==
Sports during Day 10 included athletics, boxing, diving, hockey, powerlifting, squash, table tennis

Gold medalists
Sport	Event	Competitor(s)	NOC	Rec	Ref
Athletics	Women's pole vault	Alana Boyd	Australia		
Athletics	Women's 5000 metres	Mercy Cherono	Kenya		
Athletics	Men's triple jump	Khotso Mokoena	South Africa		
Athletics	Men's javelin throw	Julius Yego	Kenya		
Athletics	Men's 1500 metres	James Kiplagat Magut	Kenya		
Athletics	Women's 4 × 400 metres relay	Christine Day; Novlene Williams-Mills; Anastasia le-Roy; Stephanie McPherson	Jamaica	GR	
Athletics	Men's 4 × 400 metres relay	Conrad Williams; Michael Bingham; Daniel Awde; Matthew Hudson-Smith	England		
Athletics	Women's 4 × 100 metres relay	Kerron Stewart; Veronica Campbell-Brown; Schillonie Calvert; Shelly-Ann Fraser-Pryce	Jamaica	GR	
Athletics	Men's 4 × 100 metres relay	Jason Livermore; Kemar Bailey-Cole; Nickel Ashmeade; Usain Bolt	Jamaica	GR	
Boxing	Women's flyweight	Nicola Adams	England		
Boxing	Women's lightweight	Shelley Watts	Australia		
Boxing	Men's light flyweight	Paddy Barnes	Northern Ireland		
Boxing	Men's flyweight	Andrew Moloney	Australia		
Boxing	Men's bantamweight	Michael Conlan	Northern Ireland		
Boxing	Men's lightweight	Charlie Flynn	Scotland		
Boxing	Men's light welterweight	Josh Taylor	Scotland		
Boxing	Women's middleweight	Savannah Marshall	England		
Boxing	Men's welterweight	Scott Fitzgerald	England		
Boxing	Men's middleweight	Antony Fowler	England		
Boxing	Men's light heavyweight	David Nyika	New Zealand		
Boxing	Men's heavyweight	Samir El-Mais	Canada		
Boxing	Men's super heavyweight	Joseph Joyce	England		
Diving	Women's 3 metre springboard	Esther Qin	Australia		
Diving	Men's 10 metre platform	Tom Daley	England		
Hockey	Women's tournament	Australia women's national field hockey team	Australia		
Powerlifting	Women's 61 kg	Esther Oyema	Nigeria		
Powerlifting	Women's +61 kg	Loveline Obiji	Nigeria		
Powerlifting	Men's 72 kg	Paul Kehinde	Nigeria		
Powerlifting	Men's +72 kg	Abdulazeez Ibrahim	Nigeria		
Squash	Women's doubles	Dipika Pallikal; Joshna Chinappa	India		
Table tennis	Mixed doubles	Joanna Drinkhall; Paul Drinkhall	England		
Table tennis	Women's doubles	Feng Tianwei; Yu Mengyu	Singapore		
Table tennis	Men's singles	Zhan Jian	Singapore		

== Day 11 – Sunday 3 August ==
Closing ceremony was held at 21:00 at Hampden Park in Glasgow, Scotland
Sports during Day 11 included badminton, cycling, hockey, netball, squash

Gold medalists
Sport	Event	Competitor(s)	NOC	Rec	Ref
Badminton	Mixed doubles	Chris Adcock; Gabby Adcock	England		
Badminton	Women's singles	Michelle Li	Canada		
Badminton	Men's singles	Kashyap Parupalli	India		
Badminton	Women's doubles	Vivian Hoo Kah Mun; Woon Khe Wei	Malaysia		
Badminton	Men's doubles	Goh V Shem; Tan Wee Kiong	Malaysia		
Cycling	Women's road race	Lizzie Armitstead	England		
Cycling	Men's road race	Geraint Thomas	Wales		
Hockey	Men's tournament	Australia men's national field hockey team	Australia		
Netball	Women's tournament	Australia national netball team	Australia		
Squash	Mixed doubles	David Palmer; Rachael Grinham	Australia		
Squash	Men's doubles	Cameron Pilley; David Palmer	Australia		
