= Kenya at the 2014 Commonwealth Games =

- CGF code: KEN
- CGA: National Olympic Committee of Kenya

in Glasgow, Scotland
- Flag bearer: Mercy Obiero
- Medals Ranked 9th: Gold 10 Silver 10 Bronze 5 Total 25

Commonwealth Games appearances (overview)
- 1954; 1958; 1962; 1966; 1970; 1974; 1978; 1982; 1986; 1990; 1994; 1998; 2002; 2006; 2010; 2014; 2018; 2022; 2026; 2030

Kenya competed in the 2014 Commonwealth Games in Glasgow, Scotland from 23 July – 3 August 2014.

== Medalists ==
Medal	Name	Sport	Event	Date
Gold	Flomena Cheyech Daniel	Athletics	Women's marathon	July 27
Gold	Caleb Ndiku	Athletics	Men's 5000 metres	July 27
Gold	Faith Chepngetich Kipyegon	Athletics	Women's 1500 metres	July 29
Gold	Joyce Chepkirui	Athletics	Women's 10,000 metres	July 29
Gold	Purity Cherotich Kirui	Athletics	Women's 3000 metres steeplechase	July 30
Gold	Eunice Jepkoech Sum	Athletics	Women's 800 metres	August 1
Gold	Jonathan Ndiku	Athletics	Men's 3000 metres steeplechase	August 1
Gold	James Kiplagat Magut	Athletics	Men's 1500 metres	August 2
Gold	Julius Kiplagat Yego	Athletics	Men's javelin throw	August 2
Gold	Mercy Cherono	Athletics	Women's 5000 metres	August 2
Silver	Caroline Kilel	Athletics	Women's marathon	July 27
Silver	Stephen Kwelio Chemlany	Athletics	Men's marathon	July 27
Silver	Isiah Kiplangat Koech	Athletics	Men's 5000 metres	July 27
Silver	Florence Kiplagat	Athletics	Women's 10,000 metres	July 29
Silver	Milcah Chemos Cheywa	Athletics	Women's 3000 metres steeplechase	July 30
Silver	David Rudisha	Athletics	Men's 800 metres	July 31
Silver	Josphat Kipkoech Bett	Athletics	Men's 10,000 metres	August 1
Silver	Jairus Birech	Athletics	Men's 3000 metres steeplechase	August 1
Silver	Janet Kisa	Athletics	Women's 5000 metres	August 2
Silver	Ronald Kwemoi	Athletics	Men's 1500 metres	August 2
Bronze	Emily Chebet	Athletics	Women's 10,000 metres	July 29
Bronze	Joan Kipkemoi	Athletics	Women's 3000 metres steeplechase	July 30
Bronze	Ezekiel Kemboi Cheboi	Athletics	Men's 3000 metres steeplechase	August 1
Bronze	Benson Gicharu Njangiru	Boxing	Men's Bantamweight	August 1
Bronze	Joyce Wambui Njuguna	Weightlifting	Women's +61 kg	August 2

== Athletics ==
Men

Athlete	Event	Round 1		Semifinal		Final	
Athlete	Event	Result	Rank	Result	Rank	Result	Rank
Stephen Wafula Barasa	100 m	10.81	7	did not advance			
Tony Chirchir	100 m	10.85	7	did not advance			
Walter Moenga	100 m	10.84	7	did not advance			
Jonathan Kipchumba Sum	100 m (T37)	13.39	5	—		did not advance	
Collins Omae Gichana	200 m	21.90	7	did not advance			
Carvin Nkanata	200 m	20.65	2 Q	20.65	3	did not advance	
Solomon Odongo Buoga	400 m	DQ					
Boniface Mucheru	400 m	DNS					
Mark Mutai	400 m	47.60	4	did not advance			
Evans Kipkorir	800 m	1:50.88	3 Q	1:47.35	4 q	1:46.09	4
Ferguson Cheruiyot Rotich	800 m	1:48.70	2 Q	1:46.88	2 Q	1:47.34	9
David Rudisha	800 m	1:46.89	1 Q	1:46.61	1 Q	1:45.48	2nd place, silver medalist(s)
Ronald Kwemoi	1500 m	3:39.90	1 Q	—		3:39.53	2nd place, silver medalist(s)
James Kiplagat Magut	1500 m	3:40.79	3 Q	—		3:39.31	1st place, gold medalist(s)
Elijah Motonei Manangoi	1500 m	3:41.63	6 q	—		3:45.47	12
Samuel Kuria Ngige	1500 m (T54)	3:42.53 PB	5 q	—		3:49.79	10
Henry Caleb Otieno Odiyo	1500 m (T54)	3:58.51 PB	7	—		did not advance	
Joseph Kitur Kiplimo	5000 m	—				13:17.49	4
Isiah Kiplangat Koech	5000 m	—				13:14.06	2nd place, silver medalist(s)
Caleb Mwangangi Ndiku	5000 m	—				13:12.07	1st place, gold medalist(s)
Josphat Bett Kipkoech	10,000 m	—				27:56.14	2nd place, silver medalist(s)
Charles Cheruiyot	10,000 m	—				27:59.91	5
Peter Kirui	10,000 m	—				27:58.24	4
Nicholas Bett	400 metres hurdles	51.21	5	—		did not advance	
Boniface Mucheru	400 metres hurdles	49.67	1 Q	—		49.99	6
Jairus Birech	3,000 metres steeplechase	—				8:12.68	2nd place, silver medalist(s)
Ezekiel Kemboi Cheboi	3,000 metres steeplechase	—				8:19.73	3rd place, bronze medalist(s)
Jonathan Ndiku	3,000 metres steeplechase	—				8:10.44	1st place, gold medalist(s)
Walter Moenga; Carvin Nkanata; Tony Chirchir; Collins Omae Gichana	4 x 100 metres relay	40.32	4	—		did not advance	
Mark Muttai; Solomon Odongo Buoga; Nicholas Brett; Boniface Mucheru	4 x 400 metres relay	Disqualified		—		did not advance	
Stephen Kwelio Chemlany	Marathon	—				2:11:58	2nd place, silver medalist(s)
John Eriku Kelai	Marathon	—				2:12:41	5
Eric Ndiema	Marathon	—				2:13:44	6

Athlete	Event	Qualification		Final	
Athlete	Event	Distance	Rank	Distance	Rank
Elijah Kimitei	Long jump	No Mark		did not advance	
Tera Kiplangat	Long jump	7.61	12 q	7.45	11
Elijah Kiplagat Kimitei	Triple jump	15.84	12 q	15.45	9
Isaac Yego	Triple jump	No Mark		did not advance	
Mathieu Kiplagat Sawe	High jump	2.11	18	did not advance	
Alexander Kiprotich	Javelin throw	68.91 SB	17	did not advance	
Julius Yego	Javelin throw	82.83	2 Q	83.87	1st place, gold medalist(s)

Women

Athlete	Event	Heat		Semifinal		Final	
Athlete	Event	Result	Rank	Result	Rank	Result	Rank
Sabina Mukoswa	100 m	12.53	7	did not advance			
Milcent Ndoro	100 m	12.18 PB	7	did not advance			
Nelly Nasimiyu Munialo	100 m (T12)	15.10	2	—		did not advance	
Maureen Jelagat Maiyo	400 m	53.21	3 Q	52.97	5	did not advance	
Jacinter Shikanda	400 m	54.81	6	did not advance			
Janeth Jepkosgei Busienei	800 m	2.05.37	3 Q	02:04.60	7	did not advance	
Agatha Kimaswai	800 m	2.04.64	5	did not advance			
Eunice Jepkoech Sum	800 m	2.02.36	1 Q	02:01.38	1 Q	2:00.31	1st place, gold medalist(s)
Selah Busienei	1500 metres	4:08.85 =PB	4 Q	—		4:17.88	12
Faith Chepngetich Kipyegon	1500 metres	4:05.77	1 Q	—		4:08.94	1st place, gold medalist(s)
Hellen Onsando Obiri	1500 metres	4:04.43 GR	1 Q	—		4:10.84	6
Rahel Akoth Alar	1500 m (T54)	4:53.93 PB	7	—		did not advance	
Eunice Adhiambo Otieno	1500 m (T54)	4:53.65 PB	6	—		did not advance	
Caroline Wanjira	1500 m (T54)	5:01.89 PB	7	—		did not advance	
Mercy Cherono	5000 metres	—				15:07.21	1st place, gold medalist(s)
Janet Kisa	5000 metres	—				15:08.90	2nd place, silver medalist(s)
Margaret Muriuki	5000 metres	—				15:10.38 SB	4
Emily Chebet	10,000 metres	—				32:10.82 PB	3rd place, bronze medalist(s)
Joyce Chepkirui	10,000 metres	—				32:09.35 PB	1st place, gold medalist(s)
Florence Kiplagat	10,000 metres	—				32:09.48	2nd place, silver medalist(s)
Florence Wasike	400 metres hurdles	59.29	7	—		did not advance	
Milcah Chemos Cheywa	3000 metres steeplechase	—				9:31.30 SB	2nd place, silver medalist(s)
Joan Kipkemoi	3000 metres steeplechase	—				9:33.34	3rd place, bronze medalist(s)
Purity Cherotich Kirui	3000 metres steeplechase	—				9:30.96	1st place, gold medalist(s)
Milicent Ndoro; Sabina Mukoswa; Koki Manunga; Maureen Thomas	4 x 100 metres relay	46.00	5	—		did not advance	
Jacinter Shakanda; Koki Manunga; Florence Wasike; Maureen Jelaghat Maiyo	4 x 400 metres relay	3:37.45	5	—		did not advance	
Flomena Cheyech Daniel	Marathon	—				2:26:45	1st place, gold medalist(s)
Caroline Kilel	Marathon	—				2:27:10	2nd place, silver medalist(s)
Philes Ongori	Marathon	—				did not finish	

Athlete	Event	Qualification		Final	
Athlete	Event	Distance	Position	Distance	Position
Gladys Musyoki	Long jump	6.04	20	did not advance	
Lucy Omondi	Hammer throw	47.70	17	did not advance	
Linda Oseso	Hammer throw	58.82 PB	11 q	52.75	12

== Badminton ==
Mixed team

Pool B

Pos	Team	Pld	W	L	GF	GA	GD	PF	PA	PD	Pts	Qualification
1	India	3	3	0	30	0	+30	630	195	+435	3	Quarterfinals
2	Ghana	3	2	1	12	19	−7	457	586	−129	2	
3	Uganda	3	1	2	11	21	−10	473	593	−120	1	
4	Kenya	3	0	3	9	22	−13	414	600	−186	0	

Source: glasgow2014.com

Kenya
2
Commonwealth Arena, Glasgow
24 July

Uganda
3

			1	2	3
1	(Kenya) (Uganda)	Lavina Sabastian Martins / Joseph Matheri Githitu; Wilson Tukire / Margaret Nankabirwa	21; 19	14; 21	13; 21
2	(Kenya) (Uganda)	Victor Odera Munga; Edwin Ekiring	17; 21	7; 21
3	(Kenya) (Uganda)	Mercy Mwethya Joseph; Daisy Nakalyango	21; 14	21; 15
4	(Kenya) (Uganda)	Patrick Kinyua Mbogo / Joseph Matheri Githitu; Edwin Ekiring / Wilson Tukire	17; 21	13; 21
5	(Kenya) (Uganda)	Mercy Mwethya Joseph / Lavina Sabastian Martins; Daisy Nakalyango / Margaret Nankabirwa	21; 19	21; 17

Kenya
2
Commonwealth Arena, Glasgow
24 July

Ghana
3

			1	2	3
1	(Kenya) (Ghana)	Victor Odera Munga / Lavina Sabastian Martins; Daniel Sam / Stella Amasah	17; 21	15; 21
2	(Kenya) (Ghana)	Joseph Matheri Githitu; Emmanuel Donkor	12; 21	14; 21
3	(Kenya) (Ghana)	Mercy Mwethya Joseph; Evelyn Botwe	21; 11	21; 10
4	(Kenya) (Ghana)	Patrick Kinyua Mbogo / Victor Odera Munga; Daniel Sam / Emmanuel Donkor	14; 21	15; 21
5	(Kenya) (Ghana)	Mercy Mwethya Joseph / Lavina Sabastian Martins; Stella Amasah / Evelyn Botwe	21; 17	21; 16

India
5
Commonwealth Arena, Glasgow
25 July

Kenya
0

			1	2	3
1	(India) (Kenya)	Srikanth Kidambi / Jwala Gutta; Patrick Kinyua Mbogo / Mercy Joseph	21; 8	21; 8
2	(India) (Kenya)	Parupalli Kashyap; Victor Odera Munga	21; 7	21; 8
3	(India) (Kenya)	P. C. Thulasi; Lavina Martins	21; 4	21; 2
4	(India) (Kenya)	R.M.V. Gurusaidutt / Pranav Chopra; Matheri Joseph Githitu / Patrick Kinyua Mbogo	21; 5	21; 6
5	(India) (Kenya)	P. V. Sindhu / Jwala Gutta; Lavina Martins / Mercy Joseph	21; 4	21; 5

== Cycling ==
=== Mountain biking ===
Athlete	Event	Time	Rank
Samson Gichuru	Men's cross-country	LAP	24
Benard Kabiro	Men's cross-country	LAP	32
Antony Muite	Men's cross-country	LAP	29
Joyce Nyaruri	Women's cross-country	DNF	
Mary Mburu	Women's cross-country	DNF	
Mary Muchina	Women's cross-country	DNF	

=== Road ===
Women

Athlete	Event	Time	Rank
Doreen Musoliza Lwimbuli	Road race	DNF	
Joyce Nyaruri Matara	Road race	DNF	
Jane Njeri Mwangi	Road race	DNF	
Joyce Muthoni Mwangi	Road race	DNF	

== Judo ==
Men

Athlete	Event	Round of 32	Round of 16	Quarterfinals	Semifinals	Repechage	Final / BM	
Athlete	Event	Opposition Result	Opposition Result	Opposition Result	Opposition Result	Opposition Result	Opposition Result	Rank
Anthony Njagi	−66 kg	Weithers (BAR); L 0000–1000	did not advance					
Kinyanjui	−73 kg	Vui (PNG); L 010-010	did not advance					
James Ganzo	−73 kg	Bye	Nelson (PNG); W 0023–0002	Bensted (AUS); L 0001–1000	Did not advance	Fleming (NIR); L 0002-1000	Did not advance	7
John Kirimi	−81 kg	Bye	Livesey (ENG); L 0002–1001	did not advance				
Joshuah Omondi	−81 kg	Bye	Nicola (CYP); L 0000–1100	did not advance				
Levy Sang	−90 kg	Hall (ENG); L 0000–1000	did not advance					
Evans Kengara	−100 kg	Burton (SCO); L 0000–1000	did not advance					

Women

Athlete	Event	Round of 16	Quarterfinal	Semifinal	Repechage	Final / BM	
Athlete	Event	Opposition Result	Opposition Result	Opposition Result	Opposition Result	Opposition Result	Rank
Alice Muragu	−78 kg	—	Mballa Atanga (CMR); L 0001-1010	Did not advance	Rose (SEY); L 000-100	Did not advance	7
Esther Ratugi	+78 kg	—	Widanalage (SRI); W 1011-0000	Adlington (SCO); L 0004-1002	Bye	R Kaur (IND); L 0003-0000	5

== Rugby sevens ==
Kenya has qualified a rugby sevens team.

Team	Pld	W	D	L	PF	PA	PD	Pts	Qualification
South Africa	3	3	0	0	106	0	+106	9	Medal competition
Kenya	3	2	0	1	63	25	+38	7	Medal competition
Cook Islands	3	1	0	2	33	88	−55	5	Bowl competition
Trinidad and Tobago	3	0	0	3	15	104	−89	3	Bowl competition

26 July 2014
11:16

Kenya	28–0	Cook Islands
	Report

Ibrox Stadium, Glasgow

26 July 2014
19:52

Kenya	35–5	Trinidad and Tobago
	Report

Ibrox Stadium, Glasgow

26 July 2014
22:10

South Africa	20–0	Kenya
	Report

Ibrox Stadium, Glasgow

== Shooting ==
Women

Athlete	Event	Qualification		Final	
Athlete	Event	Points	Rank	Points	Rank
Linet Awuor Owiti	10 metre air pistol	331	27	did not advance	

== Swimming ==
Men

Athlete	Event	Heat		Semifinal		Final	
Athlete	Event	Time	Rank	Time	Rank	Time	Rank
Steven Maina	50 m freestyle	26.08	52	did not advance			
Issa Mohamed	50 m freestyle	24.34	31	did not advance			
Tory Pragassa	50 m freestyle	25.10	39	did not advance			
Jason Dunford	100 m freestyle	50.60	11 Q	50.78	16	did not advance	
Steven Maina	100 m freestyle	55.41	43	did not advance			
Issa Mohamed	100 m freestyle	53.96	32	did not advance			
Hamdan Bayusuf	50 m backstroke	27.53	19	did not advance			
Hamdan Bayusuf	100 m backstroke	1:00.07	23	did not advance			
Steven Maina	200 m backstroke	2:14.90	17	—		did not advance	
Micah Fernandes	50 m breaststroke	30.08	21	did not advance			
Tory Pragassa	50 m breaststroke	30.73	26	did not advance			
Micah Fernandes	100 m breaststroke	1:07.09	23	did not advance			
Tory Pragassa	100 m breaststroke	1:09.26	26	did not advance			
Micah Fernandes	200 m breaststroke	2:24.15	16	—		did not advance	
Jason Dunford	50 m butterfly	23.76	5 Q	24.03	9	did not advance	
Issa Mohamed	50 m butterfly	26.00	26	did not advance			
Jason Dunford	100 m butterfly	53.27	5 Q	52.94	7 Q	52.71	7
Issa Mohamed	100 m butterfly	58.05	22	did not advance			

Women

Athlete	Event	Heat		Semifinal		Final	
Athlete	Event	Time	Rank	Time	Rank	Time	Rank
Sylvia Brunlehner	50 m freestyle	26.86	18	did not advance			
Anita Field	50 m freestyle	29.25	=48	did not advance			
Danielle Awori	100 m freestyle	1:02.90	34	did not advance			
Sylvia Brunlehner	100 m freestyle	58.78	22	did not advance			
Ger Ogot	100 m freestyle	1:04.89	38	did not advance			
Ann Wacuka	100 metre freestyle S8	2:17.11	6 Q	—		2:04.03	6
Danielle Awori	50 m backstroke	32.41	23	did not advance			
Anita Field	50 m backstroke	32.86	27	did not advance			
Talisa Lanoe	50 m backstroke	31.92	19	did not advance			
Danielle Awori	100 m backstroke	1:08.63	22	did not advance			
Anita Field	100 m backstroke	1:11.08	24	did not advance			
Talisa Lanoe	100 m backstroke	1:07.18	=16^{[a]}	did not advance			
Talisa Lanoe	200 m backstroke	2:26.12	13	—		did not advance	
Rebecca Kamau	50 m breaststroke	33.83	19	did not advance			
Martha Opiyo	50 m breaststroke	36.81	32	did not advance			
Rebecca Kamau	100 m breaststroke	1:14.92	23	did not advance			
Martha Opiyo	100 m breaststroke	1:23.64	37	did not advance			
Sylvia Brunlehner	50 m butterfly	28.79	24	did not advance			
Anita Field	50 m butterfly	31.84	43	did not advance			
Ger Ogot	50 m butterfly	31.31	40	did not advance			
Ger Ogot	100 m butterfly	1:12.81	30	did not advance			
Martha Opiyo	100 m butterfly	1:10.21	28	did not advance			
Rebecca Kamau	200 m individual medley	2:26.66	20	—		did not advance	
Martha Opiyo	200 m individual medley	2:38.18	24	—		did not advance	

^{a} Talisa Lanoe finished in equal 16th position in the heats alongside Northern Ireland's Danielle Hill. A swim-off was held between the two competitors which Hill won and was awarded with the 16th and last qualification place in to the semifinal.

== Triathlon ==
Athlete	Event	Swim (1.5 km)	Bike (40 km)	Run (10 km)	Total Time	Rank
Swaleh Balala	Men's	22:36	Lapped			
Vincent Onyango	Men's	did not finish				
Jessie de Boer	Women's	27:37	Lapped			
Hanifa Said	Women's	did not finish				

== Weightlifting ==
Men

Athlete	Event	Snatch	Clean & Jerk	Total	Rank
Webstar Lukose	77 kg	110	132	242	21
Stephen Opondo	85 kg	106	147	253	17
James Adede	105 kg	115	145	260	10

Women

Athlete	Event	Snatch	Clean & Jerk	Total	Rank
Mercy Obiero	69 kg	80	107	187	8

Powerlifting

Athlete	Event	Total	Rank
Samson Okutto	Men's 72 kg	175.6	5
Gabriel Magu Wanjinku	Men's 72 kg	130.5	12
Flomena Jepkoech	Women's 61 kg	did not start	
Joyce Wambui Njuguna	Women's +61 kg	68.6	3rd place, bronze medalist(s)

== Wrestling ==
Men's freestyle

Athlete	Event	Round of 32	Round of 16	Quarterfinal	Semifinal	Repechage	Final / BM	
Athlete	Event	Opposition Result	Opposition Result	Opposition Result	Opposition Result	Opposition Result	Opposition Result	Rank
John Kariuki	−61 kg	—	Essindi Sengui (CMR); L 2-14	did not advance				
Jacone Munene	−65 kg	—	van Rensburg (RSA); 0-10	did not advance				
Peter Omenda	−86 kg	—	Bye	Dick (NGR); L 0-10	Did not advance	—	Hietbrink (RSA); L 0-10	5
Hollis Mkanga	−125 kg	—	Bye	Jarvis (CAN); L 1-11	Did not advance	—	Xxx (ENG); L 1-12	5

Women's freestyle

Athlete	Event	Round of 16	Quarterfinal	Semifinal	Repechage	Final / BM	
Athlete	Event	Opposition Result	Opposition Result	Opposition Result	Opposition Result	Opposition Result	Rank
Leah Ndungu	−63 kg	Bye	Spiteri (ENG); L 0-10	did not advance			
Emily Mbogo	−69 kg	—	Molongwana (RSA); L 0-4	did not advance			
