= Athletics at the 2014 Commonwealth Games – Men's 1500 metres =

Men's 1500 metres at the Commonwealth Games

The Men's 1500 metres at the 2014 Commonwealth Games, as part of the athletics programme, was held at Hampden Park between 1 and 2 August 2014.

== Results ==
=== Preliminaries ===
==== Heat 1 ====
Rank	Order	Name	Result	Notes	Qual.
1	5	Nick Willis (NZL)	3:40.76		Q
2	10	Jeffrey Riseley (AUS)	3:40.79		Q
3	7	James Kiplagat Magut (KEN)	3:40.79		Q
4	9	Chris O'Hare (SCO)	3:40.80		Q
5	3	John Bazili Baynit (TAN)	3:40.93		q
6	2	Ronald Musagala (UGA)	3:41.24		q
7	11	Zane Robertson (NZL)	3:43.02		
8	12	Jake Wightman (SCO)	3:43.87		
9	8	Richard Peters (ENG)	3:44.10		
10	6	Danny Mooney (NIR)	3:45.79		
11	1	Lee Emanuel (ENG)	3:46.29		
12	13	Kefasi Chitsala (MAW)	3:55.95		
13	4	Deonne Nicol-Samuel (SVG)	3:58.40		

==== Heat 2 ====
Rank	Order	Name	Result	Notes	Qual.
1	2	Ronald Kwemoi (KEN)	3:39.90		Q
2	9	Charlie Grice (ENG)	3:40.09		Q
3	5	Johan Cronje (RSA)	3:40.17		Q
4	3	Chris Gowell (WAL)	3:40.30		Q
5	1	Julian Matthews (NZL)	3:40.33		q
6	8	Elijah Motonei Manangoi (KEN)	3:41.63		q
7	6	Ryan Gregson (AUS)	3:41.91		
8	12	David Bishop (SCO)	3:43.10		
9	4	Harvey Dixon (GIB)	3:44.67	NR	
10	10	Dotto Ramadhani Ikangaa (TAN)	3:46.29	PB	
11	13	Chauncy Master (MAW)	3:46.59		
12	11	Andipas Georasi (PNG)	4:05.30	PB	
	7	Alberto Mamba (MOZ)	DNS		

=== Final ===
Rank	Order	Name	Result	Notes
1st place, gold medalist(s)	2	James Kiplagat Magut (KEN)	3:39.31	
2nd place, silver medalist(s)	12	Ronald Kwemoi (KEN)	3:39.53	
3rd place, bronze medalist(s)	6	Nick Willis (NZL)	3:39.60	
4	5	Johan Cronje (RSA)	3:39.65	
5	8	Jeffrey Riseley (AUS)	3:40.27	
6	9	Chris O'Hare (SCO)	3:40.63	
7	11	Charlie Grice (ENG)	3:41.58	
8	3	John Bazili Baynit (TAN)	3:41.74	
9	4	Julian Matthews (NZL)	3:41.84	
10	7	Chris Gowell (WAL)	3:42.10	
11	1	Ronald Musagala (UGA)	3:42.42	
12	10	Elijah Motonei Manangoi (KEN)	3:45.47	
