= Athletics at the 2014 Commonwealth Games – Women's hammer throw =

Women's hammer throw at the Commonwealth Games

The Women's hammer throw at the 2014 Commonwealth Games, as part of the athletics programme, took place at Hampden Park on 27 and 28 July 2014.

== Results ==
=== Qualification ===
Final qualification mark was set at 65 metres, and athletes reaching that marked qualified for the final. Where less than twelve made the mark, the first twelve athletes were to qualify for the final as of right. In the event, only three qualified automatically, and nine reached the final without making the mark.

Canada's Sultana Frizell was the best mark from the first round, at 68.92 metres, a new Commonwealth Games record

| Rank | Name | #1 | #2 | #3 | Result | Notes |
|---|---|---|---|---|---|---|
| 1 | Sultana Frizell (CAN) | 68.92 | | | 68.92 | Q, GR |
| 2 | Julia Ratcliffe (NZL) | 67.96 | | | 67.96 | Q |
| 3 | Sophie Hitchon (ENG) | 65.31 | | | 65.31 | Q |
| 4 | Carys Parry (WAL) | 64.72 | 63.22 | – | 64.72 | q |
| 5 | Susan McKelvie (SCO) | x | 62.00 | x | 62.00 | q |
| 6 | Rachel Hunter (SCO) | 60.96 | 61.64 | 61.91 | 61.91 | q |
| 7 | Gabrielle Neighbour (AUS) | 55.25 | 59.61 | 61.23 | 61.23 | q |
| 8 | Sarah Holt (ENG) | 61.05 | x | x | 61.05 | q |
| 9 | Shaunagh Brown (ENG) | 59.37 | 57.42 | 57.91 | 59.37 | q |
| 10 | Lara Nielsen (AUS) | 59.28 | 58.76 | 57.40 | 59.28 | q |
| 11 | Linda Oseso (KEN) | 58.82 | x | x | 58.82 | q, PB |
| 12 | Myra Perkins (SCO) | 57.70 | 57.69 | 57.70 | 57.70 | q |
| 13 | Queen Obisesan (NGR) | 57.16 | 56.99 | 56.75 | 57.16 | |
| 14 | Paraskevi Theodorou (CYP) | x | x | 57.00 | 57.00 | |
| 15 | Natalie Grant (JAM) | x | 56.10 | x | 56.10 | |
| 16 | Vanessa Levy (JAM) | 50.29 | x | 47.32 | 50.29 | |
| 17 | Lucy Omondi (KEN) | 47.70 | x | 44.33 | 47.70 | |

=== Final ===
| Rank | Name | #1 | #2 | #3 | #4 | #5 | #6 | Result | Notes |
|---|---|---|---|---|---|---|---|---|---|
| 1st place, gold medalist(s) | Sultana Frizell (CAN) | 70.55 | 70.29 | 68.53 | 69.89 | 71.97 | 70.60 | 71.97 | GR |
| 2nd place, silver medalist(s) | Julia Ratcliffe (NZL) | 68.35 | 68.68 | 69.96 | 69.33 | 69.47 | x | 69.96 | |
| 3rd place, bronze medalist(s) | Sophie Hitchon (ENG) | 67.59 | x | 64.46 | x | 66.19 | 68.72 | 68.72 | |
| 4 | Sarah Holt (ENG) | 60.68 | 62.79 | 65.67 | 64.87 | 65.48 | x | 65.67 | SB |
| 5 | Carys Parry (WAL) | x | 64.58 | 62.96 | 64.38 | 64.19 | 65.37 | 65.37 | |
| 6 | Susan McKelvie (SCO) | 63.76 | x | 59.32 | 60.64 | 61.61 | 59.45 | 63.76 | |
| 7 | Rachel Hunter (SCO) | x | 62.18 | 60.50 | 63.29 | 61.19 | 60.51 | 63.29 | |
| 8 | Gabrielle Neighbour (AUS) | 60.65 | 59.44 | 57.92 | 60.62 | 61.84 | 60.65 | 61.84 | |
| 9 | Lara Nielsen (AUS) | 59.25 | 60.18 | 59.78 | —N/a | —N/a | —N/a | 60.18 | |
| 10 | Myra Perkins (SCO) | 59.12 | 58.27 | 60.16 | —N/a | —N/a | —N/a | 60.16 | |
| 11 | Shanaugh Brown (ENG) | x | 55.67 | 58.67 | —N/a | —N/a | —N/a | 58.67 | |
| 12 | Linda Oseso (KEN) | x | 52.75 | 52.27 | —N/a | —N/a | —N/a | 52.75 | |
