= Athletics at the 2014 Commonwealth Games – Men's 10,000 metres =

Men's 10,000 metres at the Commonwealth Games

The Men's 10,000 metres at the 2014 Commonwealth Games, as part of the athletics programme, was held at Hampden Park on 1 August 2014.

== Results ==
Rank	Order	Name	Result	Notes
1st place, gold medalist(s)	5	Moses Ndiema Kipsiro (UGA)	27:56.11	
2nd place, silver medalist(s)	17	Josphat Bett Kipkoech (KEN)	27:56.14	SB
3rd place, bronze medalist(s)	9	Cameron Levins (CAN)	27:56.23	
4	3	Peter Kirui (KEN)	27:58.24	SB
5	24	Charles Cheruiyot (KEN)	27:59.91	PB
6	16	Mohammed Ahmed (CAN)	28:02.96	SB
7	19	Jake Robertson (NZL)	28:03.70	
8	20	Timothy Toroitich (UGA)	28:03.79	
9	15	Eric Sebahire (RWA)	28:03.88	PB
10	2	Felicien Muhitira (RWA)	28:17.07	PB
11	1	Moses Kibet (UGA)	28:30.78	
12	25	Andrew Lemoncello (SCO)	28:36.63	SB
13	23	Cyriaque Ndayikengurukiye (RWA)	28:40.44	PB
14	8	Luke Caldwell (SCO)	28:47.39	PB
15	11	Adam Bitchell (WAL)	28:47.94	PB
16	7	Ben St Lawrence (AUS)	28:49.41	
17	22	Wilbaldo Peter Malley (TAN)	28:51.94	
18	26	Harry Summers (AUS)	29:00.56	
19	10	Paul Pollock (NIR)	29:11.46	
20	13	Callum Hawkins (SCO)	29:12.52	
21	12	Thabo Ntlaloe (LES)	29:15.91	
22	6	Keith Gerrard (IOM)	29:46.85	
23	18	Mothimokholo Hatasi (LES)	30:03.17	PB
24	21	Rethabile Molefi (LES)	30:48.36	
25	14	Dewi Griffiths (WAL)	31:28.81	
	4	Jonathan Mellor (ENG)	DNF	
