= Athletics at the 2014 Commonwealth Games – Women's 5000 metres =

Women's 5000 metres at the Commonwealth Games

The Women's 5000 metres at the 2014 Commonwealth Games, as part of the athletics programme, was held at Hampden Park on 2 August 2014.

== Results ==
Rank	Order	Name	Result	Notes
1st place, gold medalist(s)	2	Mercy Cherono (KEN)	15:07.21	
2nd place, silver medalist(s)	5	Janet Kisa (KEN)	15:08.90	
3rd place, bronze medalist(s)	11	Joanne Pavey (ENG)	15:08.96	
4	13	Margaret Muriuki (KEN)	15:10.38	SB
5	8	Eloise Wellings (AUS)	15:14.99	SB
6	9	Laura Whittle (SCO)	15:33.72	
7	16	Emily Brichacek (AUS)	15:39.96	
8	1	Emelia Gorecka (ENG)	15:40.03	
9	15	Beth Potter (SCO)	15:44.38	
10	3	Jessica O'Connell (CAN)	15:45.33	
11	10	Helen Clitheroe (ENG)	15:55.00	
12	17	Elinor Kirk (WAL)	15:57.67	
13	4	Lucy van Dalen (NZL)	15:58.43	
14	12	Stephanie Twell (SCO)	16:30.66	
15	14	Sarah Mercier (GUE)	16:31.05	NR
16	6	Juliana Sakat (GHA)	18:04.61	
17	7	Sharon Firisua (SOL)	18:45.18	NR
