= Athletics at the 2014 Commonwealth Games – Women's 1500 metres =

Women's 1500 metres at the Commonwealth Games

The Women's 1500 metres at the 2014 Commonwealth Games, as part of the athletics programme, was held at Hampden Park between 28 and 29 July 2014.

The winning margin was 0.30 seconds equalling the winning margin from this event at the Auckland games in 1990. As of 2024, these are the closest finals in the women's 1500 metres at these games.

== Results ==
=== Preliminaries ===
==== Heat 1 ====
| Rank | Order | Name | Result | Notes | Qual. |
|---|---|---|---|---|---|
| 1 | 5 | Hellen Onsando Obiri (KEN) | 4:04.43 | GR | Q |
| 2 | 4 | Nikki Hamblin (NZL) | 4:05.08 | SB | Q |
| 3 | 8 | Laura Muir (SCO) | 4:05.19 | | Q |
| 4 | 7 | Hannah England (ENG) | 4:05.62 | SB | Q |
| 5 | 6 | Melissa Duncan (AUS) | 4:05.76 | PB | q |
| 6 | 3 | Kaila McKnight (AUS) | 4:06.06 | SB | q |
| 7 | 1 | Nicole Sifuentes (CAN) | 4:06.61 | SB | q |
| 8 | 2 | Natalia Evangelidou (CYP) | 4:16.05 | PB | |

==== Heat 2 ====
| Rank | Order | Name | Result | Notes | Qual. |
|---|---|---|---|---|---|
| 1 | 2 | Faith Kipyegon (KEN) | 4:05.77 | | Q |
| 2 | 6 | Kate van Buskirk (CAN) | 4:07.74 | | Q |
| 3 | 4 | Laura Weightman (ENG) | 4:08.58 | | Q |
| 4 | 9 | Selah Busienei (KEN) | 4:08.85 | =PB | Q |
| 5 | 5 | Jemma Simpson (ENG) | 4:09.27 | | q |
| 6 | 3 | Zoe Buckman (AUS) | 4:11.56 | | |
| 7 | 8 | Lucy van Dalen (NZL) | 4:14.86 | | |
| 8 | 1 | Sarah Mercier (GUE) | 4:24.05 | NR | |
| 9 | 7 | Winnie Nanyondo (UGA) | DNS | | |

=== Final ===
| Rank | Order | Name | Result | Notes |
|---|---|---|---|---|
| 1st place, gold medalist(s) | 12 | Faith Kipyegon (KEN) | 4:08.94 | |
| 2nd place, silver medalist(s) | 2 | Laura Weightman (ENG) | 4:09.24 | |
| 3rd place, bronze medalist(s) | 9 | Kate van Buskirk (CAN) | 4:09.41 | |
| 4 | 1 | Nicole Sifuentes (CAN) | 4:10.48 | |
| 5 | 11 | Nikki Hamblin (NZL) | 4:10.77 | |
| 6 | 5 | Hellen Onsando Obiri (KEN) | 4:10.84 | |
| 7 | 10 | Hannah England (ENG) | 4:11.10 | |
| 8 | 7 | Kaila McKnight (AUS) | 4:12.77 | |
| 9 | 6 | Jemma Simpson (ENG) | 4:12.93 | |
| 10 | 4 | Melissa Duncan (AUS) | 4:14.10 | |
| 11 | 8 | Laura Muir (SCO) | 4:14.21 | |
| 12 | 3 | Selah Busienei (KEN) | 4:17.88 | |
