= Moses Kibet =

Ugandan runner (born 1991)

Personal information
- Born: 23 March 1991 (age 34) Suam, Uganda

Sport
- Sport: Athletics
- Event(s): 5000 metres, 10,000 metres

Moses Kibet (born 23 March 1991) is a Ugandan middle- and long-distance runner. He represented his country at the 2009, 2011, and 2015 World Championships.

== International competitions ==
Year	Competition	Venue	Position	Event	Notes
Representing Uganda
2008	World Junior Championships	Bydgoszcz, Poland	17th (h)	1500 m	3:50.82
2008	Commonwealth Youth Games	Pune, India	1st	5000 m	14:10.86
2009	World Championships	Berlin, Germany	29th (h)	5000 m	13:52.38
2010	World Junior Championships	Moncton, Canada	33rd (h)	1500 m	3:50.53
2010	World Junior Championships	Moncton, Canada	4th	5000 m	13:36.59
2011	World Championships	Daegu, South Korea	30th (h)	5000 m	14:05.15
2014	World Half Marathon Championships	Copenhagen, Denmark	29th	Half marathon	1:02:02
2014	Commonwealth Games	Glasgow, United Kingdom	15th	5000 m	13:49.81
2014	Commonwealth Games	Glasgow, United Kingdom	11th	10,000 m	28:30.78
2015	World Championships	Beijing, China	–	10,000 m	DNF

== Personal bests ==
Outdoor

- 1500 metres – 3:43.75 (Nijmegen 2009)
- 3000 metres – 8:05.04 (Nijmegen 2008)
- 5000 metres – 13:15.18 (Heusden-Zolder 2011)
- 10,000 metres – 28:05.71 (Ferrara 2014)
- 15 kilometres – 43:24 (Copenhagen 2014)
- 20 kilometres – 58:42 (Copenhagen 2014)
- Half marathon – 1:01:37 (Lisbon 2016)
