= Athletics at the 2014 Commonwealth Games – Men's 5000 metres =

Men's 5000 metres at the Commonwealth Games

The Men's 5000 metres at the 2014 Commonwealth Games, as part of the athletics programme, was held at Hampden Park on 27 July 2014.

== Results ==
Rank	Athlete	Time	Notes
1st place, gold medalist(s)	Caleb Ndiku (KEN)	13:12.07	
2nd place, silver medalist(s)	Isiah Kiplangat Koech (KEN)	13:14.06	
3rd place, bronze medalist(s)	Zane Robertson (NZL)	13:16.52	SB
4	Joseph Kitur Kiplimo (KEN)	13:17.49	SB
5	Mohammed Ahmed (CAN)	13:18.88	PB
6	Andy Vernon (ENG)	13:22.32	
7	Tom Farrell (ENG)	13:23.96	
8	Moses Kipsiro (UGA)	13:28.23	
9	Jake Robertson (NZL)	13:29.69	SB
10	Nick Willis (NZL)	13:34.46	
11	Timothy Toroitich (UGA)	13:35.02	SB
12	Collis Birmingham (AUS)	13:35.44	
13	Luke Caldwell (SCO)	13:43.75	
14	Fabiano Nelson Sulle (TAN)	13:44.65	PB
15	Moses Kibet (UGA)	13:49.81	
16	Cyriaque Ndayikengurukiye (RWA)	13:50.55	PB
17	Pontien Ntawuyirushintege (RWA)	14:03.93	PB
18	Wilbaldo Peter Malley (TAN)	14:10.92	
19	Chauncy Master (MAW)	14:11.61	PB
20	Kefasi Chitsala (MAW)	14:26.01	
21	Mothimokholo Hatasi (LES)	14:44.93	
22	Thabo Ntlaloe (LES)	14:47.01	
23	Kabelo Lesia (LES)	15:08.91	
24	Roseefelo Siosi (SOL)	16:55.33	
