= Emma Montiel =

Gibraltarian long-distance runner

Personal information
- Born: 12 July 1975 (age 49)

Sport
- Country: Gibraltar
- Event: Long-distance running

Emma Montiel (born 12 July 1975) is a Gibraltarian long-distance runner. In 2018, she competed in the women's half marathon at the 2018 IAAF World Half Marathon Championships held in Valencia, Spain. She also competed at the 2016 IAAF World Half Marathon Championships held in Cardiff, United Kingdom.

In 2014, she represented Gibraltar at the 2014 Commonwealth Games held in Glasgow, Scotland in the women's 10,000 metres event. She finished in last place out of 13 competitors.
