= Athletics at the 2014 Commonwealth Games – Women's 10,000 metres =

Women's 10,000 metres at the Commonwealth Games

The Women's 10,000 metres at the 2014 Commonwealth Games, as part of the athletics programme, was held at Hampden Parkin Glasgow on 29 July 2014.

The winning margin was 0.13 seconds which as of 2024 remains the only time the women's 10,000 metres was won by less than half a second at these games.

== Results ==
Rank	Order	Name	Result	Notes
1st place, gold medalist(s)	1	Joyce Chepkirui (KEN)	32:09.35	
2nd place, silver medalist(s)	10	Florence Kiplagat (KEN)	32:09.48	
3rd place, bronze medalist(s)	13	Emily Chebet (KEN)	32:10.82	
4	9	Kate Avery (ENG)	32:33.35	PB
5	12	Beth Potter (SCO)	32:33.36	PB
6	4	Linet Toroitich Chebet (UGA)	32:41.95	NR
7	2	Sonia Samuels (ENG)	32:57.96	
8	7	Vanice Chemutai (UGA)	33:11.98	
9	5	Elinor Kirk (WAL)	33:22.40	
10	6	Clementine Mukandanga (RWA)	34:12.31	PB
11	3	Claudette Mukasakindi (RWA)	34:52.86	
12	8	Tonya Nero (TRI)	35:48.63	SB
13	11	Emma Montiel (GIB)	37:26.85	
