= Athletics at the 2014 Commonwealth Games – Men's 3000 metres steeplechase =

Men's 3000 metres steeplechase at the Commonwealth Games

The Men's 3000 metres steeplechase at the 2014 Commonwealth Games, as part of the athletics programme, took place at Hampden Park on 1 August 2014.

== Results ==
Rank	Order	Name	Result	Notes
1st place, gold medalist(s)	2	Jonathan Ndiku (KEN)	8:10.44	GR
2nd place, silver medalist(s)	5	Jairus Birech (KEN)	8:12.68	
3rd place, bronze medalist(s)	3	Ezekiel Kemboi Cheboi (KEN)	8:19.73	
4	9	Matthew Hughes (CAN)	8:21.88	
5	10	James Wilkinson (ENG)	8:24.98	
6	6	Chris Winter (CAN)	8:29.83	
7	8	Luke Gunn (ENG)	8:45.99	
8	1	Stephen Lisgo (SCO)	9:05.13	
9	7	James Nipperess (AUS)	9:16.76	
	4	Taylor Milne (CAN)	DQ	
