= Athletics at the 2014 Commonwealth Games – Women's 3000 metres steeplechase =

Women's 3000 metres steeplechase at the Commonwealth Games

The Women's 3000 metres steeplechase at the 2014 Commonwealth Games, as part of the athletics programme, was held at Hampden Park on 30 July 2014.

== Results ==
Rank	Order	Name	Result	Notes
1st place, gold medalist(s)	9	Purity Cherotich Kirui (KEN)	9:30.96	
2nd place, silver medalist(s)	11	Milcah Chemos Cheywa (KEN)	9:31.30	SB
3rd place, bronze medalist(s)	5	Joan Kipkemoi (KEN)	9:33.34	
4	4	Madeline Heiner (AUS)	9:34.01	PB
5	7	Genevieve LaCaze (AUS)	9:37.04	PB
6	10	Eilish McColgan (SCO)	9:44.65	SB
7	8	Racheal Bamford (ENG)	9:45.51	PB
8	3	Pippa Woolven (ENG)	9:47.97	PB
9	2	Victoria Mitchell (AUS)	9:49.05	
10	1	Lennie Waite (SCO)	9:51.93	
11	6	Kerry O'Flaherty (NIR)	9:55.94	
