= Rwanda at the 2014 Commonwealth Games =

- CGF code: RWA
- CGA: Rwanda National Olympic and Sports Committee

in Glasgow, Scotland
- Competitors: 20 in 5 sports
- Flag bearer: Theogene Hakizimana
- Medals: Gold 0 Silver 0 Bronze 0 Total 0

Commonwealth Games appearances (overview)
- 2010; 2014; 2018; 2022; 2026; 2030

Rwanda competed in the 2014 Commonwealth Games in Glasgow, Scotland from 23 July to 3 August 2014.

== Athletics ==
Key

- Note–Ranks given for track events are within the athlete's heat only
- Q = Qualified for the next round
- q = Qualified for the next round as a fastest loser or, in field events, by position without achieving the qualifying target
- NR = National record
- N/A = Round not applicable for the event

Men
Track & road events

Athlete	Event	Heat		Semifinal		Final	
Athlete	Event	Result	Rank	Result	Rank	Result	Rank
Robert Bagina	800 m	1:55.31	23	did not advance			
Emmanuel Ntakiyimana	800 m	1:55.61	24	did not advance			
Potien Ntawuyirushintege	5000 m	—				14:03.93	17
Cyriaque Ndayikengurukiye	5000 m	—				13:50.55	16
Cyriaque Ndayikengurukiye	10000 m	—				28:40.44	13
Felicien Muhitira	10000 m	—				28:17.07	10
Eric Sebahire	10000 m	—				28:03.88	9
Dieudonne Disi	Marathon	—				2:19:04	18
Jean Mvuyekure	Marathon	—				2:26:40	21

Women
Track & road events

Athlete	Event	Final	
Athlete	Event	Result	Rank
Clementine Mukandanga	10000 m	34:12.31	10
Claudette Mukasakindi	10000 m	34:52.86	11

== Boxing ==
Men

Athlete	Event	Round of 32	Round of 16	Quarterfinals	Semifinals	Final	
Athlete	Event	Opposition Result	Opposition Result	Opposition Result	Opposition Result	Opposition Result	Rank
Olivier Nshingiro	Lightweight	Bye	Lartey (GHA); L 0 - 3	did not advance			
Jean Bikorimana	Middleweight	Prince (TRI); L 0 - 3	did not advance				

== Cycling ==
=== Road ===
Men

Athlete	Event	Time	Rank
Janvier Hadi	Road race	DNF	
Janvier Hadi	Time trial	54:44.18	19
Gasore Hategeka	Road race	DNF	
Valens Ndayisenga	Road race	DNF	
Valens Ndayisenga	Time trial	56:38.87	23
Adrien Niyonshuti	Road race	DNF	
Adrien Niyonshuti	Time trial	DNS	
Jean Nsengimana	Road race	DNF	
Bonaventure Uwizeyimana	Road race	DNF	

== Swimming ==
Men

Athlete	Event	Heat		Semifinal		Final	
Athlete	Event	Time	Rank	Time	Rank	Time	Rank
Patrick Rukundo	50 m freestyle	27.30	64	did not advance			
Patrick Rukundo	100 m freestyle	1:03.36	63	did not advance			
Patrick Rukundo	50 m breaststroke	34.33	37	did not advance			
Patrick Rukundo	50 m butterfly	31.46	50	did not advance			

== Weightlifting ==
Powerlifting

Athlete	Event	Result	Rank
Theogene Hakizimana	Men's +72 kg	158.1	8
