= Susan McKelvie =

Scottish athlete

Susan McKelvie (born 15 June 1985) is a Scottish hammer thrower from Edinburgh. She is currently ranked first in Scotland, and throws for Edinburgh Athletic Club, Scotland and Great Britain. She represented her country at the 2014 Commonwealth Games in Glasgow. Currently a PE teacher, she is training with Alan Bertram. Her personal best throw is 65.03 metres (213.4 ft), set in Birmingham on 20 August 2011.
