= Joan Kipkemoi =

Kenyan long-distance runner

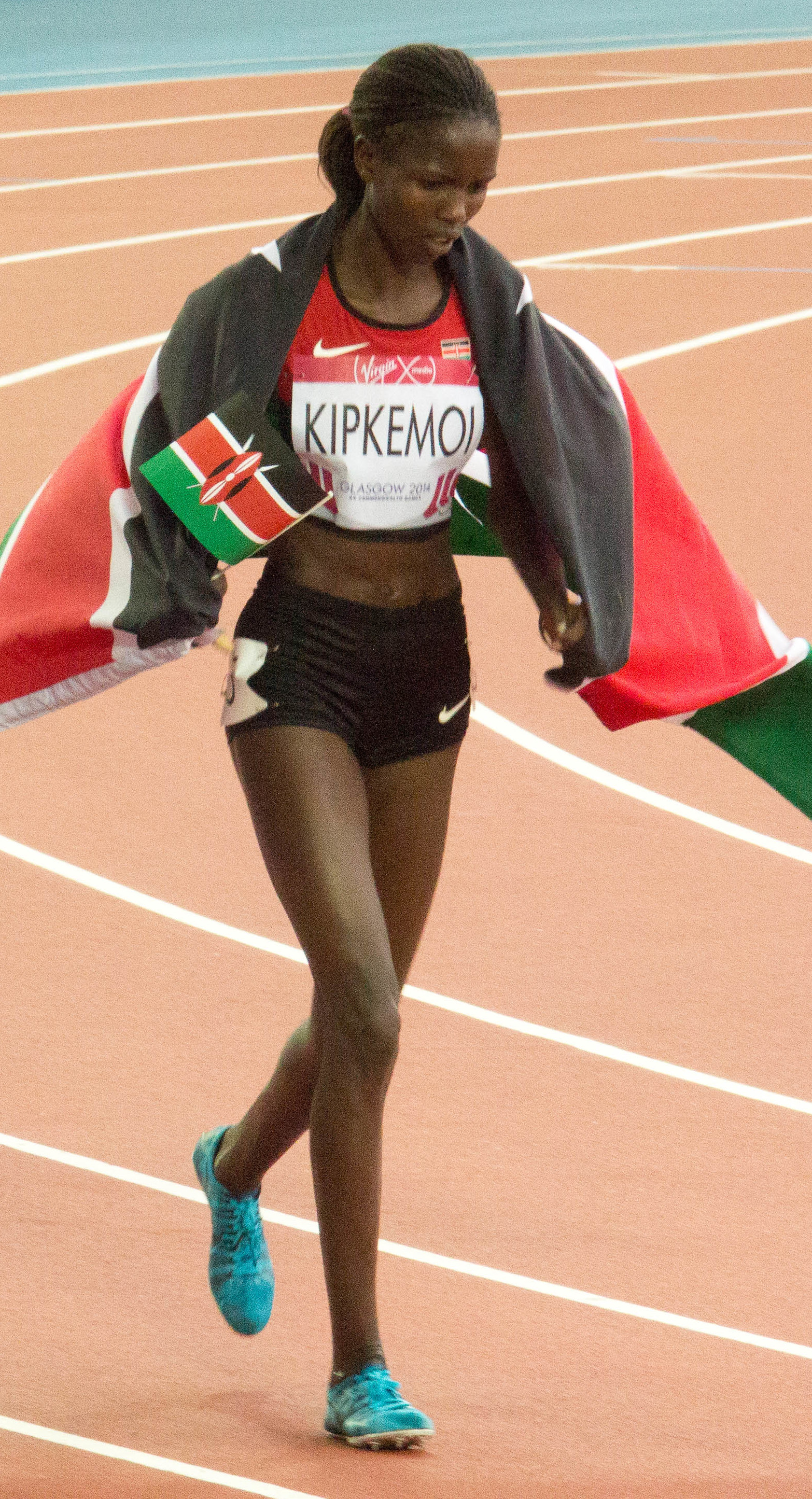
- Joan Kipkemoi in 2014

Medal record

Women's athletics

Representing Kenya

Commonwealth Games
Bronze medal – third place	2014 Glasgow	3000 m s'chase

Joan Kipkemoi Rotich (also known as Joan Chepkemoi or Joanne Kipkemoi; born 27 November 1993) is a Kenyan long-distance runner who specialises in the 3000 metres steeplechase.

Born in Kericho, Kenya, she first emerged at national level in 2014. At the Kenyan Athletics Championships she ran a personal best time of 9:44.00 minutes for the steeplechase to finish second behind Purity Kirui.

This gained her selection for the Kenyan team at the 2014 Commonwealth Games. At the competition she ran a personal best of 9:33.34 minutes to place third in the 3000 m steeplechase final. Her performance made it a Kenyan medal sweep, as her compatriots Kirui and Milcah Chemos Cheywa took the top two spots.
