= James Adede =

Kenyan weightlifter

Personal information
- Nationality: Kenyan
- Born: 31 October 1986 (age 38)
- Height: 1.62 m (5 ft 4 in)
- Weight: 92 kg (203 lb)

Sport
- Country: Kenya
- Sport: Weightlifting

James Omondi Adede (born 31 October 1986) is a Kenyan Olympic weightlifter. He represented his country at the 2016 Summer Olympics. He is coached by David Adeyemo of Nigeria, and John Ogolla.
