= Swimming at the 2014 Commonwealth Games – Men's 50 metre freestyle =

Men's 50 metre freestyle at the 2014 Commonwealth Games
- Venue: Tollcross International Swimming Centre
- Dates: 28 July 2014 (heats & semis); 29 July 2014 (final)
- Competitors: 69 from 40 nations
- Winning time: 21.92

Medalists
| gold medal | Benjamin Proud | England |
| silver medal | Cameron McEvoy | Australia |
| bronze medal | James Magnussen | Australia |

The men's 50 metre freestyle event at the 2014 Commonwealth Games as part of the swimming programme took place on 28 and 29 July at the Tollcross International Swimming Centre in Glasgow, Scotland.

The medals were presented by David Downie, President of Scottish Swimming and the quaichs were presented by Mike Summers, Chairman of the Falkland Islands Overseas Games Association.

== Records ==
Prior to this competition, the existing world and Commonwealth Games records were as follows.

| World record | César Cielo (BRA) | 20.91 | São Paulo, Brazil | 18 December 2009 |
| Commonwealth record | Ashley Callus (AUS) | 21.19 | Canberra, Australia | 26 November 2009 |
| Games record | Brent Hayden (CAN) | 22.01 | Delhi, India | 9 October 2010 |

The following records were established during the competition:

| Date | Event | Name | Nationality | Time | Record |
|---|---|---|---|---|---|
| 28 July | Semifinal | Benjamin Proud | England | 21.76 | GR |

== Results ==
=== Heats ===
| Rank | Heat | Lane | Name | Nationality | Time | Notes |
|---|---|---|---|---|---|---|
| 1 | 9 | 3 | Cameron McEvoy | Australia | 22.04 | Q |
| 2 | 9 | 5 | Matthew Abood | Australia | 22.09 | Q |
| 3 | 8 | 5 | Benjamin Proud | England | 22.21 | Q |
| 4 | 7 | 4 | James Magnussen | Australia | 22.33 | Q |
| 5 | 9 | 4 | George Bovell | Trinidad and Tobago | 22.37 | Q |
| =6 | 8 | 4 | Roland Schoeman | South Africa | 22.54 | Q |
| =6 | 8 | 6 | Richard Schaffers | Scotland | 22.54 | Q |
| 8 | 7 | 5 | Adam Brown | England | 22.66 | Q |
| 9 | 7 | 3 | Roy-Allan Burch | Bermuda | 22.68 | Q |
| 10 | 8 | 3 | Bradley Tandy | South Africa | 22.78 | Q |
| 11 | 9 | 6 | Brett Fraser | Cayman Islands | 22.79 | Q |
| 12 | 7 | 6 | Yuri Kisil | Canada | 22.87 | Q |
| 13 | 8 | 2 | Miles Munro | Guernsey | 22.94 | Q |
| 14 | 9 | 2 | James Disney-May | England | 23.04 | Q |
| 15 | 8 | 1 | Bradley Vincent | Mauritius | 23.20 | Q |
| 16 | 9 | 7 | Curtis Coulter | Northern Ireland | 23.23 | Q |
| 17 | 7 | 2 | Elvis Burrows | Bahamas | 23.24 | |
| 18 | 9 | 1 | Clement Lim | Singapore | 23.27 | |
| 19 | 6 | 7 | Jordan Augier | Saint Lucia | 23.43 | |
| 20 | 8 | 7 | Jevon Atkinson | Jamaica | 23.55 | |
| 21 | 8 | 8 | David Thompson | Northern Ireland | 23.79 | |
| =22 | 6 | 4 | Otto Putland | Wales | 23.81 | |
| =22 | 9 | 8 | Quah Zheng Wen | Singapore | 23.81 | |
| 24 | 7 | 7 | Conor Munn | Northern Ireland | 23.88 | |
| 25 | 6 | 8 | William Clark | Fiji | 23.91 | |
| 26 | 6 | 5 | Tom Gallichan | Jersey | 23.97 | |
| 27 | 6 | 3 | Meli Malani | Fiji | 23.98 | |
| 28 | 7 | 8 | Joshua Daniel | Saint Lucia | 24.01 | |
| 29 | 5 | 5 | Mathieu Marquet | Mauritius | 24.12 | |
| 30 | 7 | 1 | Lim Ching Hwang | Malaysia | 24.27 | |
| =31 | 5 | 6 | Issa Mohamed | Kenya | 24.34 | |
| =31 | 6 | 1 | Ifalemi Sau Paea | Tonga | 24.34 | |
| =31 | 6 | 6 | Cherantha de Silva | Sri Lanka | 24.34 | |
| 34 | 5 | 4 | Tom Bielich | Isle of Man | 24.51 | |
| 35 | 5 | 8 | Stanford Kawale | Papua New Guinea | 24.56 | |
| 36 | 6 | 2 | Mahfizur Rahman Sagor | Bangladesh | 24.63 | |
| 37 | 4 | 6 | Igor Mogne | Mozambique | 24.87 | |
| 38 | 2 | 8 | Alex Bregazzi | Isle of Man | 25.08 | |
| 39 | 4 | 5 | Tory Pragassa | Kenya | 25.10 | |
| 40 | 4 | 4 | Shakil Fakir | Mozambique | 25.11 | |
| 41 | 4 | 3 | Adam Viktora | Seychelles | 25.13 | |
| 42 | 5 | 3 | Hilal Hemed Hilal | Tanzania | 25.24 | |
| 43 | 5 | 2 | James Sanderson | Gibraltar | 25.33 | |
| 44 | 4 | 1 | Chris Regis | Grenada | 25.46 | |
| 45 | 2 | 2 | Brandon Schuster | Samoa | 25.53 | |
| 46 | 4 | 2 | Kwaku Addo | Ghana | 25.72 | |
| =47 | 2 | 7 | Joshua Tibatemwa | Uganda | 25.78 | |
| =47 | 3 | 6 | Dean Hoffman | Seychelles | 25.78 | |
| 49 | 3 | 4 | Andrew Hopkin | Grenada | 25.98 | |
| 50 | 3 | 3 | Sikandar Khan | Pakistan | 26.02 | |
| 51 | 3 | 2 | Mark Hoare | Swaziland | 26.03 | |
| 52 | 4 | 8 | Steven Maina | Kenya | 26.08 | |
| 53 | 1 | 4 | Matthew Shone | Zambia | 26.11 | |
| 54 | 2 | 4 | Collin Akara | Papua New Guinea | 26.22 | |
| 55 | 3 | 1 | Abbiw Jackson | Ghana | 26.25 | |
| 56 | 3 | 5 | Nishwan Ibrahim | Maldives | 26.40 | |
| 57 | 4 | 7 | Milimo Mweetwa | Zambia | 26.41 | |
| 58 | 3 | 8 | Corey Ollivierre | Grenada | 26.49 | |
| 59 | 2 | 5 | Nikolas Sylvester | Saint Vincent and the Grenadines | 26.64 | |
| 60 | 5 | 1 | Mohamed Adnan | Maldives | 27.08 | |
| 61 | 3 | 7 | Nana Antwi | Ghana | 27.12 | |
| =62 | 1 | 5 | Ben Dillon | Saint Helena | 27.14 | |
| =62 | 2 | 1 | Haris Bandey | Pakistan | 27.14 | |
| 64 | 2 | 6 | Patrick Rukundo | Rwanda | 27.30 | |
| 65 | 1 | 3 | Tong Li Panuve | Tonga | 27.51 | |
| 66 | 2 | 3 | Arnold Kisulo | Uganda | 27.66 | |
| 67 | 1 | 2 | Storm Halbich | Saint Vincent and the Grenadines | 27.78 | |
| 68 | 1 | 6 | Shane Cadogan | Saint Vincent and the Grenadines | 28.41 | |
| | 5 | 7 | Emidio Cuna | Mozambique | | DNS |

=== Semifinals ===
| Rank | Heat | Lane | Name | Nationality | Time | Notes |
|---|---|---|---|---|---|---|
| 1 | 2 | 5 | Benjamin Proud | England | 21.76 | Q, GR |
| 2 | 2 | 4 | Cameron McEvoy | Australia | 21.94 | Q |
| 3 | 1 | 4 | Matthew Abood | Australia | 22.07 | Q |
| 4 | 2 | 3 | George Bovell | Trinidad and Tobago | 22.22 | Q |
| 5 | 1 | 5 | James Magnussen | Australia | 22.23 | Q |
| 6 | 1 | 3 | Roland Schoeman | South Africa | 22.26 | Q |
| 7 | 1 | 2 | Bradley Tandy | South Africa | 22.34 | Q |
| 8 | 1 | 6 | Adam Brown | England | 22.55 | Q |
| 9 | 1 | 7 | Yuri Kisil | Canada | 22.57 | |
| 10 | 2 | 6 | Richard Schaffers | Scotland | 22.59 | |
| 11 | 2 | 2 | Roy-Allan Burch | Bermuda | 22.71 | |
| 12 | 2 | 1 | Miles Munro | Guernsey | 22.82 | |
| 13 | 2 | 7 | Brett Fraser | Cayman Islands | 22.87 | |
| 14 | 1 | 8 | Curtis Coulter | Northern Ireland | 23.02 | |
| 15 | 2 | 8 | Bradley Vincent | Mauritius | 23.09 | |
| 16 | 1 | 1 | James Disney-May | England | 23.26 | |

=== Final ===
| Rank | Lane | Name | Nationality | Time | Notes |
|---|---|---|---|---|---|
| 1st place, gold medalist(s) | 4 | Benjamin Proud | England | 21.92 | |
| 2nd place, silver medalist(s) | 5 | Cameron McEvoy | Australia | 22.00 | |
| 3rd place, bronze medalist(s) | 2 | James Magnussen | Australia | 22.10 | |
| 4 | 3 | Matthew Abood | Australia | 22.14 | |
| 5 | 6 | George Bovell | Trinidad and Tobago | 22.31 | |
| 6 | 7 | Roland Schoeman | South Africa | 22.36 | |
| 7 | 1 | Bradley Tandy | South Africa | 22.43 | |
| 8 | 8 | Adam Brown | England | 22.62 | |
