= Jonathan Ndiku =

Kenyan long-distance runner (born 1991)

Medal record

Men's athletics

Representing Kenya

African Championships
Silver medal – second place	2014 Marrakesh	3000 m st.

Commonwealth Games
Gold medal – first place	2014 Glasgow	3000 m st.

World Junior Championships
Gold medal – first place	2008 Bydgoszcz	3000 m st.
Gold medal – first place	2010 Moncton	3000 m st.

Jonathan Muia Ndiku (born 18 September 1991) is a Kenyan long-distance runner who specialises in the 3000 metres steeplechase. He has a personal best of 8:07.75 minutes. He was the gold medallist in the event at the 2014 Commonwealth Games, where he broke the Commonwealth Games record.

As a youth Ndiku ran the fastest steeplechase time for an under-17 athlete. He went on to win back-to-back titles at the IAAF World Junior Championships in Athletics in 2008 and 2010 – the first ever to do so. He was also the African junior steeplechase champion in 2009. Based in Japan with the Hitachi Cable team, he has also represented Kenya at the 2013 IAAF World Cross Country Championships.

== Career ==
=== Youth and junior career ===
Born in Machakos, he began running seriously around 2004 in the hope he could make a living out of the sport. Ndiku made his international debut at the 2007 World Youth Championships in Athletics, coming fourth in the 2000 metres steeplechase event. His technique was poor and his coach, Paul Mutwii, turned to Boniface Teren, the Kenyan national steeplechase coach, for help. Working with Teren, Ndiku's technique over the barriers greatly improved and one year later he won the gold medal at the 2008 World Junior Championships in Athletics, beating Uganda's Benjamin Kiplagat who had built up a sizeable lead in the early stages. Ndiku's winning time of 8:17.28 minutes was enough to rank the 16-year-old in the top 25 athletes in the world that year, as well as being the fastest ever recorded by a youth category athlete. His flat speed also improved, as he won the 1500 metres at the Commonwealth Youth Games that year. He also competed in Japan that year. After signing up with the Hitachi Cable corporate running team, he set track bests of 7:54.04 minutes for the 3000 metres, 13:21.17 minutes for the 5000 metres and 28:08.28 minutes for the 10,000 metres.

He won the steeplechase title at the 2009 African Junior Athletics Championships, despite having lost one of his running spikes in the first half of the race. Returning to Japanese track for Hitachi Cable, he won the 1500 m title at the All-Japan Corporate Track and Field Championships in a personal best of 3:41.83 minutes and was runner-up over 5000 m with another best time of 13:11.99 minutes. In addition, he set a 10,000 m best of 27:37.72 minutes in October – a time which ranked him in the top 25 that year.

He opened 2010 with a 1500 m win at the Hyogo Relays. He entered the steeplechase at the Kenyan Athletics Championships and was the national runner-up to Richard Mateelong. Still eighteen years old and in the junior category, he set about defending his title at the 2010 World Junior Championships in Athletics. He was the clear winner with ten seconds over the runner-up, fellow Kenyan Albert Kiptoo Yator. This made Ndiku the first athlete to defend the title in the competition's history. Having extended his country's winning streak in the event since 1986, he remarked "This race is our culture. It's a Kenyan race." Success also came in flat races that year as he won both the 1500 m and 5000 m Japan Corporate Championship titles, including a personal best of 3:39.27 minutes.

=== Senior career ===
Ndiku began to establish himself as a steeplechaser in the senior ranks in 2011. He competed on the 2011 IAAF Diamond League circuit and set a personal best of 8:07.75 minutes for sixth place at the Herculis meeting – a time which ranked him the ninth fastest in the world that year. He also ranked third at the DN Galan and fifth at the Weltklasse Zürich. He was twice runner-up at the Japanese Corporate Championships. His 2012 season was more low-key and contained few races, with wins at the Hyogo Relays and the Japanese Corporate steeplechase being the highlights. Still, his time of 8:17.88 minutes at the Meeting Areva ranked him in the top 25 for the event. He gained his first senior selection for Kenya at the 2013 IAAF World Cross Country Championships, but failed to finish the race. He completed a Japanese Corporate double over the 5000 m and 3000 m steeplechase, but his season's best time of 8:18.78 minutes was not an improvement on the previous year for the 22-year-old.

In the 2014 season Ndiku emerged as a top senior level athlete. In the steeplechase he opened with a run of 8:10.72 minutes (his fastest time since 2011) which brought him third place at the IAAF World Challenge Beijing behind Paul Kipsiele Koech and Jairus Birech. He followed this with a runner-up finish at the national championships (behind Birech) and a top three finish at the Athletissima Diamond League meeting. He was chosen for the 2014 Commonwealth Games and was the least favoured entrant of the Kenyan team behind world-leader Birech and reigning world and Olympic champion Ezekiel Kemboi. However, Ndiku completed an upset by keeping with the pair before pulling ahead in the final lap to win the gold medal in a Games record time of 8:10.44 minutes.

== Personal bests ==
- 1500 metres – 3:39.27 min (2010)
- 3000 metres – 7:39.63 min (2014)
- 5000 metres – 13:11.99 min (2009)
- 10,000 metres – 27:37.72 min (2009)
- 2000 metres steeplechase – 5:37.30 min (2007)
- 3000 metres steeplechase – 8:07.75 min (2011)
