= Swimming at the 2014 Commonwealth Games – Women's 50 metre breaststroke =

Women's event at the 2014 Commonwealth Games

Women's 50 metre breaststroke at the 2014 Commonwealth Games
- Venue: Tollcross International Swimming Centre
- Dates: 24 July 2014 (heats & semis); 25 July 2014 (final)
- Competitors: 35 from 23 nations
- Winning time: 30.59

Medalists
gold medal	Leiston Pickett	Australia
silver medal	Alia Atkinson	Jamaica
bronze medal	Corrie Scott	Scotland

The women's 50 metre breaststroke event at the 2014 Commonwealth Games as part of the swimming programme took place on 24 and 25 July at the Tollcross International Swimming Centre in Glasgow, Scotland.

The medals were presented by Sophie, Countess of Wessex and the quaichs were presented by Michael Fennell, honorary life vice-president of the Commonwealth Games Federation and president of the Jamaica Olympic Association.

== Records ==
Prior to this competition, the existing world and Commonwealth Games records were as follows.

World record	Rūta Meilutytė (LTU)	29.48	Barcelona, Spain	3 August 2013
Commonwealth record	Sarah Katsoulis (AUS)	30.16	Rome, Italy	2 August 2009
Games record	Jade Edmistone (AUS)	30.51	Melbourne, Australia	16 March 2006

The following records were established during the competition:

Date	Event	Name	Nationality	Time	Record
24 July	Semifinal	Alia Atkinson	Jamaica	30.17	GR

== Results ==
=== Heats ===
Rank	Heat	Lane	Name	Nationality	Time	Notes
1	3	4	Alia Atkinson	Jamaica	30.49	Q
2	4	4	Sophie Taylor	England	30.56	Q
3	3	5	Corrie Scott	Scotland	30.64	Q
4	5	4	Leiston Pickett	Australia	30.70	Q
5	4	6	Sycerika McMahon	Northern Ireland	31.12	Q
6	5	5	Sally Hunter	Australia	31.13	Q
7	5	3	Tera van Beilen	Canada	31.31	Q
8	4	3	Kathryn Johnstone	Scotland	31.38	Q
9	5	6	Tara-Lynn Nicholas	South Africa	31.48	Q
10	4	5	Lorna Tonks	Australia	31.70	Q
11	3	3	Andrea Strachan	Scotland	31.90	Q
12	3	6	Laura Kinley	Isle of Man	31.97	Q
13	5	2	Molly Renshaw	England	32.72	Q
14	3	8	Bethan Sloan	Wales	33.22	Q
15	5	7	Samantha Yeo	Singapore	33.26	Q
16	4	7	Niamh Robinson	Isle of Man	33.28	Q
17	3	2	Erika Kong	Malaysia	33.51	
18	4	2	Christina Loh	Malaysia	33.64	
19	2	2	Rebecca Kamau	Kenya	33.83	
20	2	3	Jamila Lunkuse	Uganda	34.62	
21	4	1	Irene Chrysostomou	Cyprus	34.68	
22	3	1	Izzy Joachim	Saint Vincent and the Grenadines	34.80	
23	3	7	Tilka Paljk	Zambia	35.19	
24	2	5	Lianna Swan	Pakistan	35.72	NR
25	2	4	Oreoluwa Cherebin	Grenada	35.78	
26	2	7	Mahfuza Khatun	Bangladesh	35.88	
27	5	8	Nadia Adrianna Redza Goh	Malaysia	35.95	
28	5	1	Barbara Vali-Skelton	Papua New Guinea	36.13	
29	4	8	Tegan McCarthy	Papua New Guinea	36.32	
30	2	8	Jocelyn Flynn	Papua New Guinea	36.44	
31	2	1	Nadeera Jayasekera	Sri Lanka	36.52	
32	1	5	Martha Opiyo	Kenya	36.81	
33	1	4	Mariam Foum	Tanzania	37.61	
34	2	6	Anum Bandey	Pakistan	38.93	
35	1	3	Aishath Sajina	Maldives	40.81	

=== Semifinals ===
Rank	Heat	Lane	Name	Nationality	Time	Notes
1	2	4	Alia Atkinson	Jamaica	30.17	Q, GR
2	1	5	Leiston Pickett	Australia	30.64	Q
3	2	6	Tera van Beilen	Canada	30.74	Q
4	2	5	Corrie Scott	Scotland	30.79	Q
5	1	4	Sophie Taylor	England	30.86	Q
6	1	6	Kathryn Johnstone	Scotland	31.12	Q
7	1	2	Lorna Tonks	Australia	31.44	Q
8	2	7	Andrea Strachan	Scotland	31.52	Q
9	2	3	Sycerika McMahon	Northern Ireland	31.56	
10	1	3	Sally Hunter	Australia	31.60	
11	1	7	Laura Kinley	Isle of Man	32.05	
12	2	2	Tara-Lynn Nicholas	South Africa	32.32	
13	2	1	Molly Renshaw	England	32.47	
14	2	8	Samantha Yeo	Singapore	32.83	
15	1	8	Niamh Robinson	Isle of Man	33.38	
16	1	1	Bethan Sloan	Wales	33.87	

=== Final ===
Rank	Lane	Name	Nationality	Time	Notes
1st place, gold medalist(s)	5	Leiston Pickett	Australia	30.59	
2nd place, silver medalist(s)	4	Alia Atkinson	Jamaica	30.67	
3rd place, bronze medalist(s)	6	Corrie Scott	Scotland	30.75	
4	2	Sophie Taylor	England	31.08	
5	3	Tera van Beilen	Canada	31.22	
6	7	Kathryn Johnstone	Scotland	31.47	
7	1	Lorna Tonks	Australia	31.48	
8	8	Andrea Strachan	Scotland	31.99	
