= Athletics at the 2014 Commonwealth Games – Women's 100 metres (T12) =

The Women's 100 metres (T12) at the 2014 Commonwealth Games as part of the athletics programme was held at Hampden Park on 28 July 2014. The event was open to Para-sport athletes competing in the T12 classification, with heavily impaired vision, but T11 athletes were also allowed to enter, though no points system was used for parity. T12 and T11 athletes require running guides. The guides of those athletes that finished in the top three also received medals.

== Results ==
=== First round ===
The first round consisted of three heats, with qualification to the finals for the first athlete in each heat and the fastest loser over the three heats.

==== Heat 1 ====
Rank	Lane	Name	Reaction Time	Result	Notes	Qual.
1	8	Maria Muchavo (MOZ); Anelton Tinga (guide)	0.278	13.40		Q
2	4	Selina Litt (ENG); Ryan Henry-Asquith (guide)	0.284	14.28		
3	6	Anna Kambinda (NAM)		15.63	SB	
				Wind: -0.9 m/s		

==== Heat 2 ====
Rank	Lane	Name	Reaction Time	Result	Notes	Qual.
1	6	Libby Clegg (SCO); Mikhail Huggins (guide)	0.158	12.23		Q
2	8	Lahja Ishitile (NAM); David Ndeilenga (guide)	0.358	13.40	SB	q
3	3	Hanah Ngendo Mwangi (KEN)	0.197	14.51		
				Wind: +1.0 m/s		

==== Heat 3 ====
Rank	Lane	Name	Reaction Time	Result	Notes	Qual.
1	5	Tracey Hinton (WAL); Steffan Hughes (guide)	0.204	13.79	SB	Q
2	1	Nelly Nasimiyu Munialo (KEN)	0.329	15.10		
3	7	Joyleen Jeffrey (PNG)	0.226	15.16		
4	4	Johanna Katjikuru (NAM)	0.355	15.38	SB	
				Wind: -1.1 m/s		

=== Final ===
Rank	Lane	Name	Reaction Time	Result	Notes	Qual.
1st place, gold medalist(s)	4	Libby Clegg (SCO); Mikhail Huggins (guide)	0.171	12.20	WL	Q
2nd place, silver medalist(s)	6	Maria Muchavo (MOZ); Anelton Tinga (guide)	0.208	13.33		
3rd place, bronze medalist(s)	2	Lahja Ishitile (NAM); David Ndeilenga (guide)	0.252	13.48		
4	8	Tracey Hinton (WAL); Steffan Hughes (guide)	0.217	13.65	SB	
				Wind: -0.3 m/s		
