= Jairus Birech =

Kenyan steeplechase runner (1992–2025)

Medal record

Men's athletics

Representing Kenya

Commonwealth Games
Silver medal – second place	2014 Glasgow	3000 m s'chase

African Championships
Gold medal – first place	2014 Marrakesh	3000 m s'chase

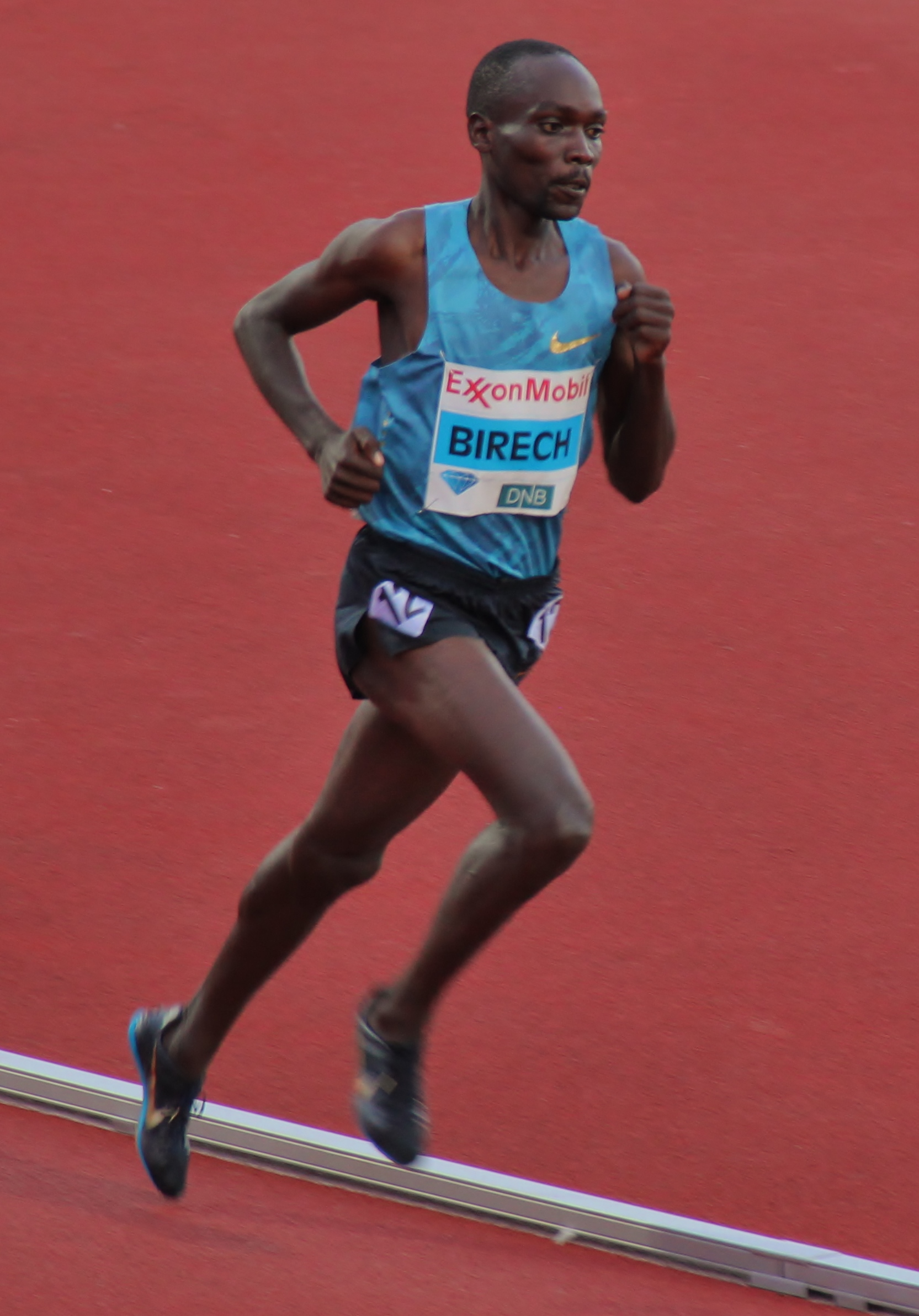
Birech at the 2015 Bislett Games

Jairus Kipchoge Birech (14 December 1992 – 18 September 2025) was a Kenyan steeplechase runner. He held personal best time of 7:58.41 minutes for the 3000 metres steeplechase, which ranked him among the top ten of all time. He was the gold medallist at the 2014 African Championships in Athletics and silver medallist at the 2014 Commonwealth Games.

Birech was a silver medallist at the African Junior Athletics Championships in 2011 and went on to place fourth at the 2011 All-Africa Games. He competed frequently on the IAAF Diamond League and was the 2014 Diamond Race winner. He was the fastest steeplechaser in the world in 2014.

== Biography ==
Born in Uasin Gishu on 14 December 1992, Birech began competing in the steeplechase as a teenager and dipped under nine minutes for the 3000 metres steeplechase for the first time in 2010, recording 8:50.0 minutes in Nairobi. He made his breakthrough at international level in the 2011 season. He started with his first medal for Kenya at the 2011 African Junior Athletics Championships, where he was the silver medallist in a Kenyan 1–2 with Gilbert Kirui. His European debut resulted in a victory at the Miners Day Meeting in Velenje. He ran at his first Diamond League race soon after and his personal best time of 8:11.31 minutes (for fifth at the Meeting Areva in Paris) ranked him thirteenth in the world that year, marking him out as one of Kenya's emerging talents. He won at the Barcelona Meeting and finished fifth at the DN Galan Diamond League. In his senior debut for Kenya, at the age of eighteen, he came fourth behind an Ethiopian trio in the steeplechase at the 2011 All-Africa Games.

He began his 2012 season in Australia and won at the Sydney Track Classic. Another win came at the Kawasaki Super Meet, where he broke the meeting record. At the Doha Diamond League meet he set a personal best of 8:06.72 minutes, but this was only enough for fourth in a quick race. He found himself behind Kenyan opposition on several occasions that year, coming in third at the Golden Gala, fourth at the Olympic trials, Meeting Areva and Memorial Van Damme, and fifth at Herculis. He performed better towards the end of the season, placing second to Paul Kipsiele Koech at the Athletissima meet, winning at the Birmingham Grand Prix, and setting a meet record at the Hanžeković Memorial. His best run of 8:03.43 minutes ranked him fifth in the world that year, behind four other Kenyans.

Birech beat Emmanuel Bett in a sprint finish at the Cross Internacional de Itálica in January 2013. He won on the track in May, improving the meet record at the Seiko Golden Grand Prix in Tokyo. On the 2012 IAAF Diamond League circuit he appeared regularly in the steeplechase but only twice made the top three (third at the London Grand Prix and second at the Weltklasse Zürich). A fourth-place at the Kenyan trials saw him miss a major tournament again and slip down the end-of-year steeplechase rankings, coming in ninth for 2013. He performed well in long-distance races, however, coming runner-up at the Cross Internacional de Venta de Baños and fourth in a 10K best of 29:00 minutes at the BOclassic.

He had a breakthrough in the 2014 Diamond League season. After a fourth-place finish in Doha, he had back-to-back wins in Rome and at the Bislett Games, running a personal best and world-lead of 8:02.37 minutes in the latter. He was a narrow second to Koech at the IAAF World Challenge Beijing, but came out on top in national competition at the Kenyan Athletics Championships. He was the world's dominant steeplechaser that year, losing only once between June and September. At the major events of the year, he was the favourite for the 2014 Commonwealth Games but was upset by fellow Kenyan Jonathan Ndiku, who beat Birech by two seconds, but he reversed that placing at the 2014 African Championships in Athletics to take the continental gold medal. On the circuit, he won the Diamond League races in Lausanne, Monaco, and Birmingham before going on to win the series final at the Memorial Van Damme, setting a new best of 7:58.41 minutes in the process. This mark made him the eleventh man to complete the distance in under eight minutes and placed him tenth on the all-time list.

== Personal life and death ==
Birech was married to Gladys Kimaiyo and had two children. He died on 18 September 2025 from an undisclosed illness after being in hospital for almost two weeks. He was 32.
