= Swimming at the 2014 Commonwealth Games – Women's 200 metre individual medley =

Women's 200 metre individual medley at the 2014 Commonwealth Games
- Venue: Tollcross International Swimming Centre
- Dates: 27 July 2014
- Competitors: 25 from 15 nations
- Winning time: 2:08.21 GR

Medalists
gold medal	Siobhan-Marie O'Connor	England
silver medal	Alicia Coutts	Australia
bronze medal	Hannah Miley	Scotland

The women's 200 metre individual medley event at the 2014 Commonwealth Games as part of the swimming programme took place on 27 July at the Tollcross International Swimming Centre in Glasgow, Scotland.

The medals were presented by Louise Martin, Honorary Secretary of the Commonwealth Games Federation, Immediate Past Chair of Commonwealth Games Scotland and vice-chair of Glasgow 2014 and the quaichs were presented by Dr Fiona McEwan, vice-chair of Commonwealth Games Scotland.

== Records ==
Prior to this competition, the existing world and Commonwealth Games records were as follows.

World record	Ariana Kukors (USA)	2:06.15	Rome, Italy	27 July 2009
Commonwealth record	Stephanie Rice (AUS)	2:07.03	Rome, Italy	27 July 2009
Games record	Alicia Coutts (AUS)	2:09.70	Delhi, India	4 October 2010

== Results ==
=== Heats ===
Rank	Heat	Lane	Name	Nationality	Time	Notes
1	3	4	Siobhan-Marie O'Connor	England	2:11.42	Q
2	4	4	Alicia Coutts	Australia	2:12.00	Q
3	2	5	Hannah Miley	Scotland	2:12.45	Q
4	4	5	Aimee Willmott	England	2:12.55	Q
5	4	3	Erika Seltenreich-Hodgson	Canada	2:14.55	Q
6	3	5	Emily Seebohm	Australia	2:14.66	Q
7	2	4	Sophie Allen	England	2:14.68	Q
8	4	6	Sydney Pickrem	Canada	2:14.95	Q
9	2	6	Marlies Ross	South Africa	2:15.17	
10	2	3	Marni Oldershaw	Canada	2:15.66	
11	3	6	Sycerika McMahon	Northern Ireland	2:16.14	
12	3	3	Kotuku Ngawati	Australia	2:17.04	
13	3	2	Rachel Williams	Wales	2:17.70	
14	4	2	Rene Warnes	South Africa	2:19.56	
15	2	2	Zara Bailey	Jamaica	2:19.83	
16	4	7	Samantha Yeo	Singapore	2:21.01	
17	3	7	Erika Kong	Malaysia	2:23.09	
18	4	1	Niamh Robinson	Isle of Man	2:23.75	
19	1	4	Matelita Buadromo	Fiji	2:26.00	
20	3	1	Rebecca Kamau	Kenya	2:26.66	
21	4	8	Lara Butler	Cayman Islands	2:27.49	
22	2	7	Nadia Adrianna Redza Goh	Malaysia	2:29.33	
23	1	5	Lianna Swan	Pakistan	2:36.19	
24	1	3	Martha Opiyo	Kenya	2:38.18	
	2	1	Bethany Firth	Northern Ireland		DNS

=== Final ===
Rank	Lane	Name	Nationality	Time	Notes
1st place, gold medalist(s)	4	Siobhan-Marie O'Connor	England	2:08.21	GR
2nd place, silver medalist(s)	5	Alicia Coutts	Australia	2:10.30	
3rd place, bronze medalist(s)	3	Hannah Miley	Scotland	2:10.74	
4	6	Aimee Willmott	England	2:11.25	
5	2	Erika Seltenreich-Hodgson	Canada	2:11.76	
6	1	Sophie Allen	England	2:12.01	
7	7	Emily Seebohm	Australia	2:14.37	
8	8	Sydney Pickrem	Canada	2:14.91	
