= Julian Matthews =

New Zealand middle-distance runner

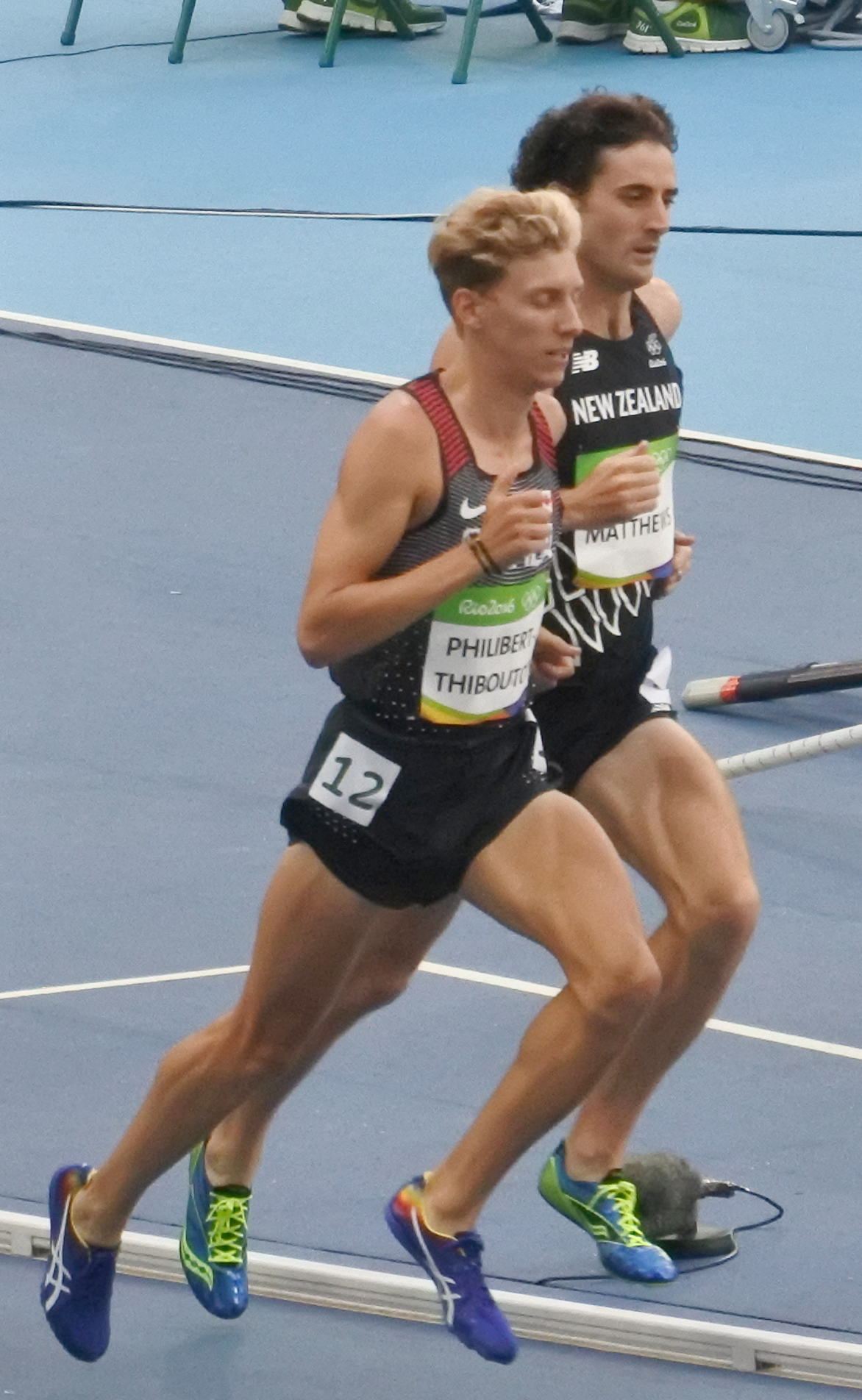
- Matthews (right) at the 2016 Olympics

Personal information
- Full name: Julian Francis Matthews
- Born: 21 July 1988 (age 38) Nelson, New Zealand
- Height: 1.84 m (6 ft 0 in)
- Weight: 73 kg (161 lb)

Sport
- Country: New Zealand
- Sport: Track and field
- Event: 1500 m
- Club: The Very Nice Track Club (Ann Arbor, U.S.)
- Coached by: Ron Warhurst

Julian Francis Matthews (born 21 July 1988) is a New Zealand middle distance runner who represented his country at the 2016 Summer Olympics.

== Early life ==
Born in Nelson in 1988, Matthews was educated at Nelson College from 2002 to 2006, representing the school at basketball as well as athletics. In 2006 he won the New Zealand secondary schools 1500 m title.

His grandfather, Trevor Wright, was a national basketball coach, and his mother played basketball for New Zealand; thus Matthews took up basketball as his first sport, and eventually was included into the national junior team. He changed to athletics because he wanted to have more personal control, that is, to move from team to individual sports.

== United States college career ==
=== Auburn University ===
In 2008, Matthews took up an athletics scholarship at Auburn University in Alabama, where he ran cross country and track. He placed 175th at the 2008 NCAA championships 10 km cross country, and 38th in the same race at the NCAA South Regional meet. On the track he achieved a personal best of 3:46.79 in finishing fourth in the 1500 m at the War Eagle Invitational meet on 17 April 2009.

=== Providence College ===
After a year at Auburn, Matthews transferred to Providence College in Rhode Island. In the 2009–10 season, he finished 176th in the NCAA championships 10 km cross country and 9th in the NCAA championships 1500 m (outdoors). On 10 May 2010, he ran a personal best time of 3:43.95 for the 1500 m at the Swarthmore Last Chance meet.

The following season, he came 130th in the NCAA 10 km cross country. At the Boston University Valentine invitational on 14 February 2011, Matthews became the 34th New Zealander and second person from Nelson (after Rod Dixon) to run a sub-four-minute mile, recording a time of 3:58.57 indoors.

In the 2011–12 season, he was 93rd in the NCAA 10 km cross country, recorded two sub-four-minute miles (one indoors and one outdoors), and was a member of the Providence team that won the distance medley relay at the Big East championships. Representing Tasman, he won the 2012 New Zealand 1500 m national championship in Auckland, recording a time of 3:54.37 in a slow, tactical race.

In his final year at Providence, Matthews improved his personal best for the mile to 3:58.14 on 14 February 2013, won the 1000 m races at the Big East championships and URI Sorlien Invitational meet, and was a member of the winning distance medley relay team at the New England championships. He graduated from Providence College in 2013.

== 2014 Commonwealth Games ==
Matthews qualified for the New Zealand team for the 2014 Commonwealth Games in Glasgow by twice meeting the 'B' qualifying standard for the 1500 m, first running 3:38.59 on 13 July 2013 at Heusden, Belgium, and then 3:38.20 at the USATF high performance meet in Eagle Rock, California, on 15 May 2014. In his 1500 m heat at Glasgow, Matthews finished fifth in a time of 3:40.33 and progressed to the final as a fastest loser. In the final, he clocked 3:41.84 to finish ninth.

== Personal bests ==
Matthews' personal best times are as follows:

Event	Time	Venue	Date
800 m	1:50.22	Gainesville, USA	15 May 2009
1000 m (indoor)	2:24.80	New York, USA	15 February 2012
1500 m	3:36.14	Swarthmore, PA, USA	17 May 2016
Mile (indoor)	3:58.14	Boston, USA	14 February 2013
3000 m	8:17.25	New York, USA	27 May 2013
