= Uganda at the 2014 Commonwealth Games =

- CGF code: UGA
- CGA: Uganda Olympic Committee
- Website: nocuganda.com

in Glasgow, Scotland
- Flag bearer: Charles Ssekyaaya
- Medals Ranked 18th: Gold 1 Silver 0 Bronze 4 Total 5

Commonwealth Games appearances (overview)
- 1954; 1958; 1962; 1966; 1970; 1974; 1978; 1982; 1986; 1990; 1994; 1998; 2002; 2006; 2010; 2014; 2018; 2022; 2026; 2030

Uganda competed in the 2014 Commonwealth Games in Glasgow, Scotland from 23 July to 3 August 2014.

== Athletics ==
Men

Athlete	Event	Round 1		Semifinal		Final	
Athlete	Event	Result	Rank	Result	Rank	Result	Rank
Alli Ngaimoko	400 m	DNS					
Emmanuel Tugumisirize	400 m	46.73	3 q	46.57	8	Did not advance	
Ronald Musagala	800 m	1:48.23	2 Q	1:45.98	2 Q	1:47.19	8
Ronald Musagala	1500 m	3:41.24	6 q	—N/a		3:42.42	11
Moses Kibet	5000 m	—N/a				13:49.81	15
Moses Kipsiro	5000 m	—N/a				13:28.23	8
Timothy Toroitich	5000 m	—N/a				13:35.02	11
Moses Kibet	10,000 m	—N/a				28:30.78	11
Moses Kipsiro	10,000 m	—N/a				27:56.11	1st place, gold medalist(s)
Timothy Toroitich	10,000 m	—N/a				28:03.79	8
Anthony Okiror; Denis Opio; Alli Ngaimoko; Emmanuel Tugumisirize	4 x 400 metres relay	Disqualified		—N/a		Did not advance	
Abraham Kiplimo	Marathon	—N/a				2:12:23	3rd place, bronze medalist(s)
Philip Kiplimo	Marathon	—N/a				2:14:09	8
Munyo Solomon Mutai	Marathon	—N/a				2:12:26	4

Athlete	Event	Qualification		Final	
Athlete	Event	Distance	Rank	Distance	Rank
Ismail Mugumya	Discus throw (F42/44)	—N/a		16.17	14

Women

Athlete	Event	Round 1		Semifinal		Final	
Athlete	Event	Result	Rank	Result	Rank	Result	Rank
Halimah Nakaayi	400 m	57.51	8	Did not advance			
Emily Nanziri	400 m	59.02	8	Did not advance			
Leni Shida	400 m	54.77	4 q	54.30	7	Did not advance	
Winnie Nanyondo	800 m	2.05.29	2 Q	2:02.83	2 Q	2:01.39	3rd place, bronze medalist(s)
Winnie Nanyondo	1500 metres	Did not start		—N/a		Did not advance	
Linet Toroitich Chebet	10,000 metres	—N/a				32:41.95 NR	6
Vanice Chemutai	10,000 metres	—N/a				33:11.98	8
	4 x 400 metres relay	Did not start		—N/a		Did not advance	

== Badminton ==
Mixed team

Pool B

Pos	Team	Pld	W	L	GF	GA	GD	PF	PA	PD	Pts	Qualification
1	India	3	3	0	30	0	+30	630	195	+435	3	Quarterfinals
2	Ghana	3	2	1	12	19	−7	457	586	−129	2	
3	Uganda	3	1	2	11	21	−10	473	593	−120	1	
4	Kenya	3	0	3	9	22	−13	414	600	−186	0	

Source: glasgow2014.com

Kenya
2
Commonwealth Arena, Glasgow
24 July

Uganda
3

			1	2	3
1	(Kenya) (Uganda)	Lavina Sabastian Martins / Joseph Matheri Githitu; Wilson Tukire / Margaret Nankabirwa	21; 19	14; 21	13; 21
2	(Kenya) (Uganda)	Victor Odera Munga; Edwin Ekiring	17; 21	7; 21
3	(Kenya) (Uganda)	Mercy Mwethya Joseph; Daisy Nakalyango	21; 14	21; 15
4	(Kenya) (Uganda)	Patrick Kinyua Mbogo / Joseph Matheri Githitu; Edwin Ekiring / Wilson Tukire	17; 21	13; 21
5	(Kenya) (Uganda)	Mercy Mwethya Joseph / Lavina Sabastian Martins; Daisy Nakalyango / Margaret Nankabirwa	21; 19	21; 17

India
5
Commonwealth Arena, Glasgow
24 July

Uganda
0

			1	2	3
1	(India) (Uganda)	R. M. V. Gurusaidutt / P. V. Sindhu; Wilson Tukire / Daisy Nakalyango	21; 4	21; 6
2	(India) (Uganda)	Srikanth Kidambi; Edwin Ekiring	21; 10	21; 8
3	(India) (Uganda)	P. C. Thulasi; Margaret Nankabirwa	21; 3	21; 1
4	(India) (Uganda)	Akshay Dewalkar / Pranav Chopra; Edwin Ekiring / Wilson Tukire	21; 6	21; 8
5	(India) (Uganda)	Jwala Gutta / Ashwini Ponnappa; Margaret Nankabirwa / Daisy Nakalyango	21; 4	21; 8

Uganda
2
Commonwealth Arena, Glasgow
25 July

Ghana
3

			1	2	3
1	(Uganda) (Ghana)	Wilson Tukire / Margaret Nankabirwa; Daniel Sam / Stella Amasah	16; 21	12; 21
2	(Uganda) (Ghana)	Edwin Ekiring; Emmanuel Donkor	21; 14	21; 15
3	(Uganda) (Ghana)	Daisy Nakalyango; Evelyn Botwe	21; 8	21; 14
4	(Uganda) (Ghana)	Edwin Ekiring / Wilson Tukire; Daniel Sam / Emmanuel Donkor	17; 21	14; 21
5	(Uganda) (Ghana)	Daisy Nakalyango / Margaret Nankabirwa; Evelyn Botwe / Stella Amasah	21; 15	17; 21	24; 26

== Rugby sevens ==
Uganda has qualified a rugby sevens team.

Team	Pld	W	D	L	PF	PA	PD	Pts	Qualification
Australia	3	3	0	0	120	19	+101	9	Medal competition
England	3	2	0	1	104	15	+89	7	Medal competition
Uganda	3	1	0	2	22	97	−75	5	Bowl competition
Sri Lanka	3	0	0	3	21	136	−115	3	Bowl competition

26 July 2014
13:12

Australia	43–5	Uganda
	Report

Ibrox Stadium, Glasgow

26 July 2014
18:24

England	40–0	Uganda
	Report

Ibrox Stadium, Glasgow

26 July 2014
20:42

Sri Lanka	14–17	Uganda
	Report

Ibrox Stadium, Glasgow

== Swimming ==
Men

Athlete	Event	Heat		Semifinal		Final	
Athlete	Event	Time	Rank	Time	Rank	Time	Rank
Joshua Tibatemwa	50 m freestyle	25.78	=47	Did not advance			
Arnold Kisulo	50 m freestyle	27.66	66	Did not advance			
Arnold Kisulo	50 m backstroke	30.73	29	Did not advance			
Arnold Kisulo	100 m backstroke	1:06.41	31	Did not advance			
Joshua Tibatemwa	50 m breaststroke	33.72	34	Did not advance			
Joshua Tibatemwa	100 m breaststroke	1:16.49	31	Did not advance			
Arnold Kisulo	50 m butterfly	28.61	43	Did not advance			

Women

Athlete	Event	Heat		Semifinal		Final	
Athlete	Event	Time	Rank	Time	Rank	Time	Rank
Jamila Lunkuse	50 m freestyle	27.43	27	Did not advance			
Jamila Lunkuse	50 m breaststroke	34.62	20	Did not advance			
Jamila Lunkuse	100 m breaststroke	1:15.11	24	Did not advance			

== Weightlifting ==
Men

Athlete	Event	Snatch	Clean & jerk	Total	Rank
Charles Ssekyaaya	62 kg	113	142	255	10
Kalidi Batuusa	85 kg	121	145	266	14

Women

Athlete	Event	Snatch	Clean & jerk	Total	Rank
Becky Namusoke	+75 kg	86	115	201	9

Powerlifting

Athlete	Event	Total	Rank
Baabu Baambumba	Men's +72 kg	113.3	13
Vaster Kyalimpa	Women's +61 kg	DNF	
