= Tory Pragassa =

Kenyan swimmer

Personal information
- Full name: Tory Michael Pragassa
- Born: 14 October 1996 (age 29) Nairobi, Kenya
- Height: 1.83 m (6 ft 0 in)
- Weight: 90 kg (200 lb)

Sport
- Country: Kenya
- Sport: Swimming
- Event: 50m breaststroke
- Club: Poseidon Swim Club
- Coached by: John Wroe

Achievements and titles
- Commonwealth finals: Glasgow 2014 (heats)

Tory Michael Pragassa (born 14 October 1996) is a Kenyan swimmer. He competed at the 2014 Commonwealth Games in Glasgow, but did not qualify for the semi-finals of any of his events, finishing 26th in both the 50m breaststroke and 100m breaststroke heats, and 39th in the 50m freestyle heats.

== Early career ==
Pragassa broke five national junior records at the 2012 CASA Inter Clubs Swimming Championship in Mombasa. On 4 June 2012, he clocked 2:06.50 in the 14–15 years' 200m freestyle, beating the previous junior and boys' 2:06.55 record set by David Dunford on 13 March 2004. He then clocked 0:35.81 in the 10–11 years' 50m backstroke event, just shading the boys' 0:35.83 record set by Jason Dunford on 21 February 1998. He shattered the previous junior and boys' 2:23.20 individual medley record set by Kim Jin-woo on 4 October 1998, setting a new time of 2:20.10.

The following year, he won a silver medal at the CANA Zone 3–4 Championships in Lusaka, Zambia, posting a time of 31.93 seconds in the 15–16 years' 50m backstroke event.
