= Athletics at the 2014 Commonwealth Games =

- Dates: 27 July – 2 August 2014
- Host city: Glasgow, Scotland
- Venue: Hampden Park
- Events: 50
- Participation: – athletes from – nations
- Records set: 8 games records

Athletics was one of ten core sports that appeared at the 2014 Commonwealth Games in Glasgow. As a founding sport, athletics has appeared consistently since its introduction at the 1911 Inter-Empire Games; the recognised precursor to the Commonwealth Games.

The competition took place between Sunday 27 July and Saturday 2 August at the temporarily modified Hampden Park, Scotland's national football stadium. The programme commenced with 42km195m marathon, which started and finished at Glasgow Green and included 6 parathletics events throughout. Racewalking events were dropped from the programme for 2014 – a move condemned by walking athletes.

The meet was dominated, in terms of golds won, by Kenya, Jamaica who won 10 gold medals apiece and Australia with eight gold medals, though gold and other medals were distributed among 21 teams, and England took away the most medals, 27 including 13 silver medals.

Kenya dominated the distance events, and Jamaica the sprint events, but both also won throwing events for the first time. Host nation Scotland won 4 medals, including gold for Libby Clegg in the T(12) 100 m for athletes with a vision impairment.

Nigeria's Blessing Okagbare took two golds and a silver medal in the three sprint events, the most successful individual athlete at the meet. Jamaican sprint Olympic and World champions Usain Bolt and Shelly-Ann Fraser-Pryce both decided to forgo the individual sprint events, but appeared on the final evening of the meet to win golds in the relays.

== Preparation ==
In preparation for hosting the Commonwealth Games Athletics events, the modified Hampden Park held the full-test Sainsbury's Grand Prix Diamond League event, usually held in London, on Saturday 12 July and Sunday 13 July 2014.

== Medal summary ==
=== Men ===
Event	Gold		Silver		Bronze	
100 metres	Kemar Bailey-Cole; Jamaica	10.00	Adam Gemili; England	10.10	Nickel Ashmeade; Jamaica	10.12
200 metres	Rasheed Dwyer; Jamaica	20.14	Warren Weir; Jamaica	20.26	Jason Livermore; Jamaica	20.32
400 metres	Kirani James; Grenada	44.24; GR	Wayde van Niekerk; South Africa	44.68	Lalonde Gordon; Trinidad and Tobago	44.78
800 metres	Nijel Amos; Botswana	1:45.18	David Rudisha; Kenya	1:45.48	André Olivier; South Africa	1:46.03
1500 metres	James Kiplagat Magut; Kenya	3:39.31	Ronald Kwemoi; Kenya	3:39.53	Nick Willis; New Zealand	3:39.60
5000 metres	Caleb Ndiku; Kenya	13:12.07	Isiah Kiplangat Koech; Kenya	13:14.06	Zane Robertson; New Zealand	13:16.52
10,000 metres	Moses Kipsiro; Uganda	27:56.11	Josphat Bett Kipkoech; Kenya	27:56.14	Cameron Levins; Canada	27.56.23
110 metres hurdles	Andrew Riley; Jamaica	13.32	William Sharman; England	13.36	Shane Brathwaite; Barbados	13.49
400 metres hurdles	Cornel Fredericks; South Africa	48.50	Jehue Gordon; Trinidad and Tobago	48.75	Jeffery Gibson; Bahamas	48.78
3000 metres steeplechase	Jonathan Ndiku; Kenya	8:10.44	Jairus Birech; Kenya	8:12.68	Ezekiel Kemboi Cheboi; Kenya	8:19.73
4 × 100 metres relay	Jamaica; Jason Livermore; Kemar Bailey-Cole; Nickel Ashmeade; Usain Bolt; Kimmari Roach^{†} Julian Forte^{†}	37.58; GR	England; Adam Gemili; Harry Aikines-Aryeetey; Richard Kilty; Danny Talbot; James Ellington^{†} Andrew Robertson^{†}	38.02	Trinidad and Tobago; Keston Bledman; Marc Burns; Rondel Sorrillo; Richard Thompson	38.10
4 × 400 metres relay	England; Conrad Williams; Michael Bingham; Daniel Awde; Matthew Hudson-Smith; Nigel Levine^{†}	3:00.46	Bahamas; Latoy Williams; Michael Mathieu; Alonzo Russell; Chris Brown; Andretti Bain^{†}	3:00.51	Trinidad and Tobago; Lalonde Gordon; Jarrin Solomon; Renny Quow; Zwede Hewitt; Jehue Gordon^{†}	3:01.51
Marathon	Michael Shelley; Australia	2:11:15; PB	Stephen Chemlany; Kenya	2:11:58	Abraham Kiplimo; Uganda	2:12:23
High jump	Derek Drouin; Canada	2.31 m	Kyriakos Ioannou; Cyprus	2.28 m	Michael Mason; Canada	2.25 m
Pole vault	Steven Lewis; England	5.55 m	Luke Cutts; England	5.55 m	Shawnacy Barber; Canada	5.45 m
Long jump	Greg Rutherford; England	8.20 m	Zarck Visser; South Africa	8.12 m	Rushwahl Samaai; South Africa	8.08 m
Triple jump	Khotso Mokoena; South Africa	17.20 m	Tosin Oke; Nigeria	16.84 m	Arpinder Singh; India	16.63 m
Shot put	O'Dayne Richards; Jamaica	21.61 m GR	Tom Walsh; New Zealand	21.19 m	Tim Nedow; Canada	20.59 m
Discus throw	Vikas Gowda; India	63.64 m	Apostolos Parellis; Cyprus	63.32 m	Jason Morgan; Jamaica	62.34 m
Hammer throw	James Steacy; Canada	74.16 m	Nick Miller; England	72.99 m	Mark Dry; Scotland	71.64 m
Javelin throw	Julius Yego; Kenya	83.87 m	Keshorn Walcott; Trinidad and Tobago	82.67 m	Hamish Peacock; Australia	81.75 m
Decathlon	Damian Warner; Canada	8282 pts	Ashley Bryant; England	8109 pts	Kurt Felix; Grenada	8070 pts NR

- ^{†} = Athletes who ran in the heats of the relay, but not in the final

==== Men's para-sport ====
Event	Gold		Silver		Bronze	
100 metres (T37)	Fanie van der Merwe; South Africa	11.65	Charl Du Toit; South Africa	11.89	Rhys Jones; Wales	12.04
1500 metres (T54)	David Weir; England	3:21.67	Kurt Fearnley; Australia	3:23.08	Alex Dupont; Canada	3:23.26
Discus throw (F42/44)	Dan Greaves; England	59.21 m	Aled Davies; Wales	46.83 m	Richard Okigbazi; Nigeria	39.38 m

=== Women ===
Event	Gold		Silver		Bronze	
100 metres	Blessing Okagbare; Nigeria	10.85; GR	Veronica Campbell Brown; Jamaica	11.03	Kerron Stewart; Jamaica	11.07
200 metres	Blessing Okagbare; Nigeria	22.25	Jodie Williams; England	22.50	Bianca Williams; England	22.58
400 metres	Stephenie Ann McPherson; Jamaica	50.67	Novlene Williams-Mills; Jamaica	50.86	Christine Day; Jamaica	51.09
800 metres	Eunice Sum; Kenya	2:00.51	Lynsey Sharp; Scotland	2:01.34	Winnie Nanyondo; Uganda	2:01.38
1500 metres	Faith Kipyegon; Kenya	4:08.94	Laura Weightman; England	4:09.24	Kate Van Buskirk; Canada	4:09.41
5000 metres	Mercy Cherono; Kenya	15:07.21	Janet Kisa; Kenya	15:08.90	Joanne Pavey; England	15:08.96
10,000 metres	Joyce Chepkirui; Kenya	32:09.35	Florence Kiplagat; Kenya	32:09.48	Emily Chebet; Kenya	32:10.82
100 metres hurdles	Sally Pearson; Australia	12.67	Tiffany Porter; England	12.80	Angela Whyte; Canada	13.02
400 metres hurdles	Kaliese Spencer; Jamaica	54.10	Eilidh Child; Scotland	55.02	Janieve Russell; Jamaica	55.64
3000 metres steeplechase	Purity Kirui; Kenya	9:30.96	Milcah Cheywa; Kenya	9:31.30	Joan Kipkemoi; Kenya	9:33.34
4 × 100 metres relay	Jamaica; Kerron Stewart; Veronica Campbell Brown; Schillonie Calvert; Shelly-Ann Fraser-Pryce; Elaine Thompson^{†}	41.83; GR	Nigeria; Gloria Asumnu; Blessing Okagbare; Dominique Duncan; Lawretta Ozoh; Patience Okon George^{†}	42.92	England; Asha Philip; Bianca Williams; Jodie Williams; Ashleigh Nelson; Anyika Onuora^{†} Louise Bloor^{†}	43.10
4 × 400 metres relay	Jamaica; Christine Day; Novlene Williams-Mills; Anastasia le-Roy; Stephanie McPherson; Janieve Russell^{†} Shericka Williams^{†}	3:23.82; GR	Nigeria; Patience Okon George; Regina George; Ada Benjamin; Folashade Abugan; Funke Oladoye^{†} Omolara Omotoso^{†}	3:24.71	England; Christine Ohuruogu; Shana Cox; Kelly Massey; Anyika Onuora; Emily Diamond^{†} Margaret Adeoye^{†}	3:27.24
Marathon	Flomena Cheyech Daniel; Kenya	2:26:45	Caroline Kilel; Kenya	2:27:10	Jessica Trengove; Australia	2:30:12; PB
High jump	Eleanor Patterson; Australia	1.94 m	Isobel Pooley; England	1.92 m PB	Levern Spencer; Saint Lucia	1.92 m
Pole vault	Alana Boyd; Australia	4.50 m	Sally Peake; Wales	4.25 m	Alysha Newman; Canada; Sally Scott; England	3.80 m
Long jump	Ese Brume; Nigeria	6.56 m	Jazmin Sawyers; England	6.54 m	Christabel Nettey; Canada	6.49 m
Triple jump	Kimberly Williams; Jamaica	14.21 m	Laura Samuel; England	14.09 m	Ayanna Alexander; Trinidad and Tobago	14.01 m
Shot put	Valerie Adams; New Zealand	19.88 m	Cleopatra Borel; Trinidad and Tobago	18.57 m	Julie Labonte; Canada	17.58 m
Discus throw	Dani Samuels; Australia	64.88 m	Seema Antil Punia; India	61.61 m	Jade Lally; England	60.48 m
Hammer throw	Sultana Frizell; Canada	71.97 m GR	Julia Ratcliffe; New Zealand	69.96 m	Sophie Hitchon; England	68.72 m
Javelin throw	Kim Mickle; Australia	65.96 m GR	Sunette Viljoen; South Africa	63.19 m	Kelsey-Lee Roberts; Australia	62.95 m
Heptathlon	Brianne Theisen-Eaton; Canada	6597 pts	Jessica Zelinka; Canada	6270 pts	Jessica Taylor; England	5826 pts

- ^{†} = Athletes who ran in the heats of the relay, but not in the final

==== Women's para-sport ====
Event	Gold		Silver		Bronze	
100 metres (T12)	Libby Clegg; Scotland	12.20	Maria Muchavo; Mozambique	13.33	Lahja Ishitile; Namibia	13.48
1500 metres (T54)	Angela Ballard; Australia	3:59.20	Diane Roy; Canada	3:59.55	Jade Jones; England	4:00.19
Long jump (F37/38)	Jodi Elkington; Australia	4.39 m	Bethy Woodward; England	4.00 m	Johanna Benson; Namibia	3.82 m

=== Medal table ===
* Host nation (Scotland)

Rank	Nation	Gold	Silver	Bronze	Total
1	Kenya	10	10	3	23
2	Jamaica	10	3	6	19
3	Australia	8	1	3	12
4	England	5	13	9	27
5	Canada	5	2	10	17
6	South Africa	3	4	2	9
7	Nigeria	3	3	1	7
8	New Zealand	1	2	2	5
9	Scotland*	1	2	1	4
10	India	1	1	1	3
11	Uganda	1	0	2	3
12	Grenada	1	0	1	2
13	Botswana	1	0	0	1
14	Trinidad and Tobago	0	3	4	7
15	Wales	0	2	1	3
16	Cyprus	0	2	0	2
17	Bahamas	0	1	1	2
18	Mozambique	0	1	0	1
19	Namibia	0	0	2	2
20	Barbados	0	0	1	1
20	Saint Lucia	0	0	1	1
Totals (21 entries)		50	50	51	151

== Schedule ==
Over the 10 days of competition there were 44 medal events plus an additional 6 para-sport disciplines.

Date	Time	Stage	Gender	Event
27 July 2014 (Sunday)	09:00–13:00	Classification	Both	Men's Marathon (09:00)
27 July 2014 (Sunday)	09:00–13:00	Classification	Both	Women's marathon (09:30)
27 July 2014 (Sunday)	14:30–18:00	Preliminary	Men	100 m (Round 1 and 2)
27 July 2014 (Sunday)	14:30–18:00	Preliminary	Men	Shot Put
27 July 2014 (Sunday)	14:30–18:00	Preliminary	Women	100 m (Round 1)
27 July 2014 (Sunday)	14:30–18:00	Preliminary	Women	400 m (Round 1)
27 July 2014 (Sunday)	14:30–18:00	Preliminary	Women	Hammer Throw
27 July 2014 (Sunday)	14:30–18:00	Classification	Men	5000 m
27 July 2014 (Sunday)	14:30–18:00	Classification	Women	Para-Sport Long Jump (F37/38)
28 July 2014 (Monday)	10:00–13:00	Preliminary	Men	Para-Sport 100 m (T37) (Round 1)
28 July 2014 (Monday)	10:00–13:00	Preliminary	Men	400 m (Round 1)
28 July 2014 (Monday)	10:00–13:00	Preliminary	Men	High Jump
28 July 2014 (Monday)	10:00–13:00	Preliminary	Men	Hammer Throw
28 July 2014 (Monday)	10:00–13:00	Preliminary	Women	Para-Sport 100 m (T12) (Round 1)
28 July 2014 (Monday)	10:00–13:00	Preliminary	Women	1500 m (Round 1)
28 July 2014 (Monday)	10:00–13:00	Classification	Men	Para-Sport Discus Throw (F42/44)
28 July 2014 (Monday)	10:00–13:00	Classification	Men	Decathlon: 100 m, Long Jump & Shot Put
28 July 2014 (Monday)	19:00–22:00	Preliminary	Women	Triple Jump
28 July 2014 (Monday)	19:00–22:00	Classification	Men	100 m (semifinal & final)
28 July 2014 (Monday)	19:00–22:00	Classification	Men	Para-Sport 100 m (T37)
28 July 2014 (Monday)	19:00–22:00	Classification	Men	Shot Put
28 July 2014 (Monday)	19:00–22:00	Classification	Men	Decathlon: 400 m & High Jump
28 July 2014 (Monday)	19:00–22:00	Classification	Women	100 m (semifinal & final)
28 July 2014 (Monday)	19:00–22:00	Classification	Women	400 m (semifinal)
28 July 2014 (Monday)	19:00–22:00	Classification	Women	Para-Sport 100 m (T12)
28 July 2014 (Monday)	19:00–22:00	Classification	Women	Hammer Throw
29 July 2014 (Tuesday)	10:00–13:15	Preliminary	Men	Para-Sport 1500 m (T54) (Round 1)
29 July 2014 (Tuesday)	10:00–13:15	Preliminary	Men	800 m (Round 1)
29 July 2014 (Tuesday)	10:00–13:15	Preliminary	Men	110 m Hurdles (Round 1)
29 July 2014 (Tuesday)	10:00–13:15	Preliminary	Men	400 m Hurdles (Round 1)
29 July 2014 (Tuesday)	10:00–13:15	Preliminary	Men	Long Jump
29 July 2014 (Tuesday)	10:00–13:15	Preliminary	Women	Para-Sport 1500 m (T54) (Round 1)
29 July 2014 (Tuesday)	10:00–13:15	Preliminary	Women	Shot Put
29 July 2014 (Tuesday)	10:00–13:15	Preliminary	Women	Javelin Throw
29 July 2014 (Tuesday)	10:00–13:15	Classification	Men	Decathlon: 110 m Hurdles, Pole Vault & Discus Throw
29 July 2014 (Tuesday)	10:00–13:15	Classification	Women	Heptathlon: 100 m Hurdles & High Jump
29 July 2014 (Tuesday)	19:00–22:30	Classification	Men	400 m (semifinal)
29 July 2014 (Tuesday)	19:00–22:30	Classification	Men	110 m Hurdles
29 July 2014 (Tuesday)	19:00–22:30	Classification	Men	Hammer Throw
29 July 2014 (Tuesday)	19:00–22:30	Classification	Men	Decathlon: 1500 m & Javelin Throw
29 July 2014 (Tuesday)	19:00–22:30	Classification	Women	400 m
29 July 2014 (Tuesday)	19:00–22:30	Classification	Women	1500 m
29 July 2014 (Tuesday)	19:00–22:30	Classification	Women	10,000 m
29 July 2014 (Tuesday)	19:00–22:30	Classification	Women	Triple Jump
29 July 2014 (Tuesday)	19:00–22:30	Classification	Women	Heptathlon: 200 m & Shot Put
30 July 2014 (Wednesday)	10:00–13:00	Preliminary	Men	200 m (Round 1)
30 July 2014 (Wednesday)	10:00–13:00	Preliminary	Men	Pole Vault
30 July 2014 (Wednesday)	10:00–13:00	Preliminary	Men	Discus Throw
30 July 2014 (Wednesday)	10:00–13:00	Preliminary	Women	400 m Hurdles (Round 1)
30 July 2014 (Wednesday)	10:00–13:00	Preliminary	Women	High Jump
30 July 2014 (Wednesday)	10:00–13:00	Preliminary	Women	Long Jump
30 July 2014 (Wednesday)	10:00–13:00	Classification	Men	400 m Hurdles (semifinal)
30 July 2014 (Wednesday)	10:00–13:00	Classification	Women	Heptathlon: Long Jump
30 July 2014 (Wednesday)	19:00–22:15	Preliminary	Men	200 m (Round 2)
30 July 2014 (Wednesday)	19:00–22:15	Preliminary	Women	200 m (Round 1)
30 July 2014 (Wednesday)	19:00–22:15	Classification	Men	800 m (semifinal)
30 July 2014 (Wednesday)	19:00–22:15	Classification	Men	400 m
30 July 2014 (Wednesday)	19:00–22:15	Classification	Men	High Jump
30 July 2014 (Wednesday)	19:00–22:15	Classification	Men	Long Jump
30 July 2014 (Wednesday)	19:00–22:15	Classification	Women	3000 m Steeplechase
30 July 2014 (Wednesday)	19:00–22:15	Classification	Women	Shot Put
30 July 2014 (Wednesday)	19:00–22:15	Classification	Women	Javelin Throw
30 July 2014 (Wednesday)	19:00–22:15	Classification	Women	Heptathlon: 800 m & Javelin Throw
31 July 2014 (Thursday)	19:00–22:30	Preliminary	Women	800 m (Round 1)
31 July 2014 (Thursday)	19:00–22:30	Preliminary	Women	100 m Hurdles (Round 1)
31 July 2014 (Thursday)	19:00–22:30	Preliminary	Women	Pole Vault
31 July 2014 (Thursday)	19:00–22:30	Preliminary	Women	Discus Throw
31 July 2014 (Thursday)	19:00–22:30	Classification	Men	200 m (semifinal & final)
31 July 2014 (Thursday)	19:00–22:30	Classification	Men	Para-Sport 1500 m (T54)
31 July 2014 (Thursday)	19:00–22:30	Classification	Men	800 m
31 July 2014 (Thursday)	19:00–22:30	Classification	Men	400 m Hurdles
31 July 2014 (Thursday)	19:00–22:30	Classification	Men	Discus Throw
31 July 2014 (Thursday)	19:00–22:30	Classification	Women	200 m (semifinal & final)
31 July 2014 (Thursday)	19:00–22:30	Classification	Women	Para-Sport 1500 m (T54)
31 July 2014 (Thursday)	19:00–22:30	Classification	Women	400 m Hurdles
31 July 2014 (Thursday)	19:00–22:30	Classification	Women	Long Jump
1 August 2014 (Friday)	19:00–22:30	Preliminary	Men	1500 m (Round 1)
1 August 2014 (Friday)	19:00–22:30	Preliminary	Men	4 × 100 m relay (Round 1)
1 August 2014 (Friday)	19:00–22:30	Preliminary	Men	4 × 400 m relay (Round 1)
1 August 2014 (Friday)	19:00–22:30	Preliminary	Men	Triple Jump
1 August 2014 (Friday)	19:00–22:30	Preliminary	Men	Javelin Throw
1 August 2014 (Friday)	19:00–22:30	Preliminary	Women	4 × 100 m relay (Round 1)
1 August 2014 (Friday)	19:00–22:30	Preliminary	Women	4 × 400 m relay (Round 1)
1 August 2014 (Friday)	19:00–22:30	Classification	Men	3000 m Steeplechase
1 August 2014 (Friday)	19:00–22:30	Classification	Men	10,000 m
1 August 2014 (Friday)	19:00–22:30	Classification	Men	Pole Vault
1 August 2014 (Friday)	19:00–22:30	Classification	Women	100 m Hurdles
1 August 2014 (Friday)	19:00–22:30	Classification	Women	800 m
1 August 2014 (Friday)	19:00–22:30	Classification	Women	High Jump
1 August 2014 (Friday)	19:00–22:30	Classification	Women	Discus Throw
2 August 2014 (Saturday)	19:00–22:30	Classification	Men	4 × 100 m relay
2 August 2014 (Saturday)	19:00–22:30	Classification	Men	4 × 400 m relay
2 August 2014 (Saturday)	19:00–22:30	Classification	Men	1500 m
2 August 2014 (Saturday)	19:00–22:30	Classification	Men	Triple Jump
2 August 2014 (Saturday)	19:00–22:30	Classification	Men	Javelin Throw
2 August 2014 (Saturday)	19:00–22:30	Classification	Women	4 × 100 m relay
2 August 2014 (Saturday)	19:00–22:30	Classification	Women	4 × 400 m relay
2 August 2014 (Saturday)	19:00–22:30	Classification	Women	5000 m
2 August 2014 (Saturday)	19:00–22:30	Classification	Women	Pole Vault

== Doping ==
Doping controls were undertaken on competing athletes during the games. Amantle Montsho, a Botswana 400 metres runner and defending Commonwealth Games champion, was the first competitor from the athletics programme to fail a drugs test. After finishing fourth in the 400 m final, her "A" sample came back positive for methylhexanamine, a banned stimulant, and she was provisionally suspended pending investigation.
