= New Zealand at the 2014 Commonwealth Games =

- CG code: NZL
- CGA: New Zealand Olympic Committee
- Website: www.olympic.org.nz

in Glasgow, Scotland
- Competitors: 238 in 17 sports
- Flag bearers: Valerie Adams (opening); Richie Patterson (closing)
- Officials: Rob Waddell (chef de mission)
- Medals Ranked 6th: Gold 14 Silver 14 Bronze 17 Total 45

Commonwealth Games appearances (overview)
- 1930; 1934; 1938; 1950; 1954; 1958; 1962; 1966; 1970; 1974; 1978; 1982; 1986; 1990; 1994; 1998; 2002; 2006; 2010; 2014; 2018; 2022; 2026; 2030

New Zealand competed at the 2014 Commonwealth Games in Glasgow, from 23 July to 3 August 2014. It was the nation's 20th appearance at the Commonwealth Games, having competed at every Games since their inception in 1930. The New Zealand Olympic Committee registered the complete team on 8 July 2014, with 239 athletes competing at the Games across all 17 sports. The team was reduced to 238 prior to the opening ceremony, after judoka Patti Grogan withdrew due to an unspecified health issue.

New Zealand left Glasgow with 45 medals, including 14 golds, across 14 sports. It was the third-equal largest medal haul by the country, tying with the 2002 Games in Manchester and behind the 1950 and 1990 Games, both hosted by New Zealand in Auckland. In gold medals, the total was second only to the Auckland 1990 Games. One-third of the nation's medals were won in cycling; no medals were won in badminton, table tennis or triathlon.

== Officials ==
On 14 December 2012, Rob Waddell was appointed New Zealand's chef de mission for the 2014 Commonwealth Games and 2016 Summer Olympics.

== Medal tables ==
Medal	Name	Sport	Event	Date
Gold	Eddie Dawkins; Ethan Mitchell; Sam Webster	Cycling – Track	Men's team sprint	24 July
Gold	Sam Webster	Cycling – Track	Men's sprint	25 July
Gold	Tom Scully	Cycling – Track	Men's points race	26 July
Gold	Shane Archbold	Cycling – Track	Men's scratch race	27 July
Gold	Jo Edwards	Lawn bowls	Women's singles	27 July
Gold	Sophie Pascoe	Swimming	Women's 100 m breaststroke SB9	27 July
Gold	Sally Johnston	Shooting	Women's 50 m rifle prone	28 July
Gold	Richie Patterson	Weightlifting	Men's 85 kg	28 July
Gold	Anton Cooper	Cycling – MTB	Men's cross-country	29 July
Gold	Lauren Boyle	Swimming	Women's 400 m freestyle	29 July
Gold	Sophie Pascoe	Swimming	Women's 200 m individual medley SM10	29 July
Gold	Valerie Adams	Athletics	Women's shot put	30 July
Gold	Linda Villumsen	Cycling – Road	Women's time trial	31 July
Gold	David Nyika	Boxing	Men's light heavyweight	2 August
Silver	Adrian Leat	Judo	Men's 73 kg	25 July
Silver	Moira de Villiers	Judo	Women's 70 kg	25 July
Silver	Simon van Velthooven	Cycling – Track	Men's time trial	26 July
Silver	Sam Webster	Cycling – Track	Men's keirin	27 July
Silver	New Zealand rugby sevens team: Pita Ahki; Scott Curry; Sam Dickson; DJ Forbes; Bryce Heem; Akira Ioane; Gillies Kaka; Ben Lam; Tim Mikkelson; Declan O'Donnell; Sherwin Stowers; Joe Webber	Rugby sevens	Men's event	27 July
Silver	Tom Walsh	Athletics	Men's shot put	28 July
Silver	Julia Ratcliffe	Athletics	Women's hammer throw	28 July
Silver	Lauren Boyle	Swimming	Women's 800 m freestyle	28 July
Silver	Samuel Gaze	Cycling – MTB	Men's cross-country	29 July
Silver	Stanislav Chalaev	Weightlifting	Men's 105 kg	30 July
Silver	Lynda Bennett; Mark Noble; Barry Wynks	Lawn bowls	Open para-sport triples	31 July
Silver	David Light	Boxing	Men's heavyweight	2 August
Silver	Jack Bauer	Cycling – Road	Men's road race	3 August
Silver	New Zealand netball team (Silver Ferns): Jodi Brown; Leana de Bruin; Shannon Francois; Katrina Grant; Ellen Halpenny; Anna Harrison; Joline Henry; Casey Kopua; Laura Langman; Cathrine Latu; Liana Leota; Maria Tutaia	Netball	Tournament	3 August
Bronze	Shane Archbold; Pieter Bulling; Dylan Kennett; Marc Ryan	Cycling – Track	Men's team pursuit	24 July
Bronze	Darcina Manuel	Judo	Women's 57 kg	24 July
Bronze	Eddie Dawkins	Cycling – Track	Men's sprint	25 July
Bronze	Marc Ryan	Cycling – Track	Men's individual pursuit	25 July
Bronze	Matt Archibald	Cycling – Track	Men's time trial	26 July
Bronze	Aaron Gate	Cycling – Track	Men's points race	26 July
Bronze	Jason Koster	Judo	Men's 100 kg	26 July
Bronze	Tim Slyfield	Judo	Men's 100 kg	26 July
Bronze	Zane Robertson	Athletics	Men's 5000 metres	27 July
Bronze	Mandy Boyd; Selina Goddard; Amy McIlroy; Val Smith	Lawn bowls	Women's four	27 July
Bronze	Joelle King	Squash	Women's singles	28 July
Bronze	Tracey Lambrechs	Weightlifting	Women's +75 kg	30 July
Bronze	Sam Belkin	Wrestling	Men's freestyle 97 kg	30 July
Bronze	Tayla Ford	Wrestling	Women's freestyle 58 kg	30 July
Bronze	David Bishop	Gymnastics	Men's floor	31 July
Bronze	Nick Willis	Athletics	Men's 1500 m	2 August
Bronze	New Zealand women's hockey team (Black Sticks): Sam Charlton; Sophie Cocks; Rhiannon Dennison; Gemma Flynn; Krystal Forgesson; Katie Glynn; Jordan Grant; Rose Keddell; Olivia Merry; Stacey Michelsen; Emily Naylor; Anita Punt; Sally Rutherford; Liz Thompson; Petrea Webster; Kayla Whitelock	Hockey	Women's tournament	2 August

Medals by sport
Sport	Gold medal	Silver medal	Bronze medal	Total
Cycling	6	4	5	15
Swimming	3	1	0	4
Athletics	1	2	2	5
Lawn bowls	1	1	1	3
Weightlifting	1	1	1	3
Boxing	1	1	0	2
Shooting	1	0	0	1
Judo	0	2	3	5
Netball	0	1	0	1
Rugby sevens	0	1	0	1
Wrestling	0	0	2	2
Gymnastics	0	0	1	1
Hockey	0	0	1	1
Squash	0	0	1	1
Total	14	14	17	45

Medals by date
Date	Gold medal	Silver medal	Bronze medal	Total
24 July	1	0	2	3
25 July	1	2	2	5
26 July	1	1	4	6
27 July	3	2	2	7
28 July	2	3	1	6
29 July	3	1	0	4
30 July	1	1	3	5
31 July	1	1	1	3
1 August	0	0	0	0
2 August	1	1	2	4
3 August	0	2	0	2
Total	14	14	17	45

== Athletics ==
The NZOC announced the first athletes on 7 April, with additional athletes added on 5 May, 4 June, 19 June and 4 July. Marathon runner Kim Smith pulled out of the Games on 27 June due to a foot injury.

Track

Athlete(s)	Event	Heats		Semifinal		Final	
Athlete(s)	Event	Result	Rank	Result	Rank	Result	Rank
Nikki Hamblin	Women's 800 m	2:03.32	4 q	2:02.87	3 Q	2:02.43	7
Angie Smit	Women's 800 m	2:03.28	5 q	2:01.97	3 Q	2:01.94	5
Julian Matthews	Men's 1500 m	3:40.33	5 q	—N/a		3:41.84	9
Zane Robertson	Men's 1500 m	3:43.02	7	—N/a		Did not advance	
Nick Willis	Men's 1500 m	3:40.76	1 Q	—N/a		3:39.60	3rd place, bronze medalist(s)
Nikki Hamblin	Women's 1500 m	4:05.08	2 Q	—N/a		4:10.77	5
Lucy van Dalen	Women's 1500 m	4:14.86	7	—N/a		Did not advance	
Jake Robertson	Men's 5000 m	—N/a				13:29.69	9
Zane Robertson	Men's 5000 m	—N/a				13:16.52	3rd place, bronze medalist(s)
Nick Willis	Men's 5000 m	—N/a				13:34.46	10
Lucy van Dalen	Women's 5000 m	—N/a				15:58.43	13
Jake Robertson	Men's 10,000 m	—N/a				28:03.70	7
Zoe Ballantyne; Portia Bing; Brooke Cull; Louise Jones; Kristie Baillie; Katherine Camp	Women's 4 × 400 m relay	3:34.62 NR	6	—N/a		Did not advance	

Field - Jumps

Athlete(s)	Event	Qualifying		Final	
Athlete(s)	Event	Result	Rank	Result	Rank
Sarah Cowley	Women's high jump	1.85 m	5 Q	1.86 m	9

Field - Throws

Athlete(s)	Event	Qualifying		Final	
Athlete(s)	Event	Result	Rank	Result	Rank
Siositina Hakeai	Women's discus throw	57.19 m	4 Q	58.67 m	4
Julia Ratcliffe	Women's hammer throw	67.96 m	2 Q	69.96 m	2nd place, silver medalist(s)
Stuart Farquhar	Men's javelin throw	78.54 m	3 Q	78.14 m	5
Jacko Gill	Men's shot put	19.54 m	4 q	18.05 m	11
Tomas Walsh	Men's shot put	21.24 m NR	1 Q	21.19 m	2nd place, silver medalist(s)
Valerie Adams	Women's shot put	—N/a		19.88 m	1st place, gold medalist(s)

Combined

Athlete(s)	Event	100m	Long Jump	Shot Put	High Jump	400m	110m Hurdles	Discus	Pole Vault	Javelin	1,500m	Final	
Athlete(s)	Event	100m	Long Jump	Shot Put	High Jump	400m	110m Hurdles	Discus	Pole Vault	Javelin	1,500m	Result	Rank
Scott McLaren	Men's decathlon	734; 11.59 s	644; 6.26 m	750; 14.35 m	610; 1.78 m	0 DNS	Withdrew						
Brent Newdick	Men's decathlon	821; 11.18 s	866; 7.22 m	726; 13.96 m	740; 1.93 m	687; 52.87 s	794; 15.47 s	717; 42.58 m	0 DNS	Withdrew			

== Badminton ==
The NZOC announced the team on 7 May 2014.

Individual events

Player(s)	Event	Round of 64	Round of 32	Round of 16	Quarter Final	Semi Final	Final	Rank
Player(s)	Event	Opposition Result	Opposition Result	Opposition Result	Opposition Result	Opposition Result	Opposition Result	Rank
Joe Wu	Men's singles	Dullewa (SRI); L 21–23 17–21	Did not advance					
Michael Fowke	Men's singles	Sarim (MDV); W 21–9 21–10	Karunaratna (SRI); L 9–21 18–21	Did not advance				
Michelle Chan	Women's singles	Bye	Rathnasiri (SRI); W 17–21 21–7 21–12	Turner (WAL); W 21–10 21–11	Gilmour (SCO); L 9–21 10–21	Did not advance		
Anna Rankin	Women's singles	Bye	Marritt (IOM); W 21–14 21–11	Joseph (KEN); W 21–5 21–13	Sindhu (IND); L 10–21 9–21	Did not advance		
Kevin Dennerly-Minturn; Oliver Leydon-Davis	Men's doubles	Bye	Ekiring & Tukire (UGA); W 21–10 21–7	Font & Gwilt (WAL); L WO	Did not advance			
Anna Rankin; Madeleine Stapleton	Women's doubles	—N/a	Amasah & Bowte (GHA); W 21–10 21–3	Rathnasiri & Weerasinghe (SRI); L 20–22 21–18 19–21	Did not advance			
Kevin Dennerly-Minturn; Madeleine Stapleton	Mixed doubles	Jaffray & Williams (FAI); W 21–9 21–2	Donkor & Archer (GHA); W 21–16 21–12	Singapore; L ret	Did not advance			
Oliver Leydon-Davis; Susannah Leydon-Davis	Mixed doubles	Gwilt & Thomas (WAL); W 16–21 21–13 21–10	Chan & Lai (MAS); L 11–21 21–18 13–21	Did not advance				

Mixed team

Pool C

Pos	Team	Pld	W	L	GF	GA	GD	PF	PA	PD	Pts	Qualification
1	Scotland	3	3	0	30	0	+30	636	283	+353	3	Quarterfinals
2	New Zealand	3	2	1	20	10	+10	562	408	+154	2	
3	Guernsey	3	1	2	7	26	−19	409	666	−257	1	
4	Seychelles	3	0	3	6	27	−21	410	660	−250	0	

Source: glasgow2014.com

New Zealand
5
Commonwealth Arena, Glasgow
24 July

Guernsey
0

			1	2	3
1	(New Zealand) (Guernsey)	Oliver Leydon-Davis / Susannah Leydon-Davis; Daniel Penney / Gayle Lloyd	21; 9	21; 14
2	(New Zealand) (Guernsey)	Joe Wu; Stuart Hardy	21; 6	21; 8
3	(New Zealand) (Guernsey)	Michelle Chan; Elena Johnson	21; 12	21; 9
4	(New Zealand) (Guernsey)	Kevin Dennerly-Minturn / Oliver Leydon-Davis; Stuart Hardy / Daniel Penney	21; 10	21; 12
5	(New Zealand) (Guernsey)	Michelle Chan / Madeleine Stapleton; Elena Johnson / Gayle Lloyd	21; 16	21; 13

New Zealand
5
Commonwealth Arena, Glasgow
24 July

Seychelles
0

			1	2	3
1	(New Zealand) (Seychelles)	Oliver Leydon-Davis / Susannah Leydon-Davis; Georgie Cupidon / Juliette Ah-Wan	21; 8	21; 12
2	(New Zealand) (Seychelles)	Joe Wu; Kervin Ghislain	21; 13	21; 7
3	(New Zealand) (Seychelles)	Michelle Chan; Allisen Camille	21; 5	21; 9
4	(New Zealand) (Seychelles)	Kevin Dennerly-Minturn / Oliver Leydon-Davis; Georgie Cupidon / Steve Malcouzanne	21; 9	22; 20
5	(New Zealand) (Seychelles)	Michelle Chan / Madeleine Stapleton; Juliette Ah-Wan / Allisen Camille	21; 0	21; 0

Scotland
5
Commonwealth Arena, Glasgow
25 July

New Zealand
0

			1	2	3
1	(Scotland) (New Zealand)	Robert Blair / Imogen Bankier; Oliver Leydon-Davis / Susannah Leydon-Davis	21; 8	21; 10
2	(Scotland) (New Zealand)	Kieran Merrilees; Joe Wu	21; 13	21; 17
3	(Scotland) (New Zealand)	Kirsty Gilmour; Michelle Chan	21; 15	23; 21
4	(Scotland) (New Zealand)	Robert Blair / Paul van Rietvelde; Kevin Dennerly-Minturn / Oliver Leydon-Davis	23; 21	23; 21
5	(Scotland) (New Zealand)	Imogen Bankier / Kirsty Gilmour; Anna Rankin / Madeleine Stapleton	21; 4	21; 11

== Boxing ==
The NZOC announced its initial seven-member boxing team on 29 May 2014, adding two extra members a week later on 6 June.

Men

Athlete	Event	Round of 32	Round of 16	Quarter Final	Semi Final	Final	Rank
Athlete	Event	Opposition Result	Opposition Result	Opposition Result	Opposition Result	Opposition Result	Rank
Chad Milnes	Lightweight	Chakma (BAN); W 3–0	Shaningwa (NAM); W 3–0	Cordina (WAL); L 0–3	Did not advance		
Leroy Hindley	Light welterweight	Al Amin (BAN); W 2–0	Williams (BAH); W TKO	Jonas (NAM); L 0–3	Did not advance		
Bowyn Morgan	Welterweight	Benson (SCO); W 2–1	Tswiige (BOT); W 2–1	Fitzgerald (ENG); L 1–2	Did not advance		
Eric Finau	Middleweight	Falekaono (TON); W 3–0	Lusizi (RSA); L 0–3	Did not advance			
David Nyika	Light heavyweight	Sizani (RSA); W 2–0	Forrest (SCO); W 3–0	Sangwan (IND); W 3–0	McGlinchy (NIR); W 3–0	St Pierre (MRI); W	1st place, gold medalist(s)
David Light	Heavyweight	—N/a	Omar (MAS); W KO	Okoth (KEN); W 3–0	Lavelle (SCO); W 2–1	El Mais (CAN); L	2nd place, silver medalist(s)
Patrick Mailata	Super heavyweight	—N/a	Goodall (AUS); L 0–3	Did not advance			

Women

Athlete	Event	Round of 16	Quarter Final	Semi Final	Final	Rank
Athlete	Event	Opposition Result	Opposition Result	Opposition Result	Opposition Result	Rank
Alexis Pritchard	Lightweight	Spicer (DMA); L 0–3	Did not advance			
Magan Maka	Middleweight	Bye	Fortin (CAN); L 0–3	Did not advance		

== Cycling ==
=== Mountain biking ===
Athlete	Event	Time	Rank
Anton Cooper	Men's cross-country	1:38:26	1st place, gold medalist(s)
Sam Gaze	Men's cross-country	1:38:29	2nd place, silver medalist(s)
Kate Fluker	Women's cross-country	1:44:56	8
Karen Hanlen	Women's cross-country	1:43:31	6

=== Road ===
The NZOC announced an eleven-member team on 8 May 2014. James Oram pulled out of the team on 10 June, while Hayden Roulston pulled out on 16 June due to injury.

Road race

Athlete	Event	Time	Rank
Shane Archbold	Men's road race	DNF	
Jack Bauer	Men's road race	4:14:26	2nd place, silver medalist(s)
Greg Henderson	Men's road race	4:18:20	7
Mike Northey	Men's road race	DNF	
Tom Scully	Men's road race	DNF	
Jesse Sergent	Men's road race	DNF	
Rushlee Buchanan	Women's road race	2:44:12	14
Emily Collins	Women's road race	DSQ	
Joanne Kiesanowski	Women's road race	2:44:12	9
Jaime Nielsen	Women's road race	2:44:12	16
Reta Trotman	Women's road race	2.44:12	15
Linda Villumsen	Women's road race	2:39:57	5

Time trial

Athlete	Event	Time	Rank
Jesse Sergent	Men's time trial	48:33.73	5
Jaime Nielsen	Women's time trial	43:29.85	4
Reta Trotman	Women's time trial	44:30.12	11
Linda Villumsen	Women's time trial	42:25.46	1st place, gold medalist(s)

=== Track ===
The NZOC announced the initial fourteen-member team on 17 April 2014. Two additional team members were added on 28 May and 10 June.

Sprint

Athlete(s)	Event	Qualifying		Heats	Quarter Final	Semifinal	Final	
Athlete(s)	Event	Time	Rank	Opposition Time	Opposition Time	Opposition Time	Opposition Time	Rank
Matt Archibald	Men's sprint	10.055	5 Q	Oliva (WAL); W 10.621	Lewis (AUS); L	Did not advance		
Eddie Dawkins	Men's sprint	9.818	2 Q	Kenny (ENG); W 10.606	Crampton (ENG); W	Webster (NZL); L	Lewis (AUS); W	3rd place, bronze medalist(s)
Sam Webster	Men's sprint	9.933	3 Q	Skinner (SCO); W 10.308	Awang (MAS); W	Dawkins (NZL); W	Kenny (ENG); W	1st place, gold medalist(s)
Stephanie McKenzie	Women's sprint	11.336	4 Q	—N/a	Mustapa (MAS); L	Did not advance		
Eddie Dawkins; Ethan Mitchell; Sam Webster	Men's team sprint	43.254	1	—N/a			England; 43.181 GR	1st place, gold medalist(s)

Keirin

Athlete(s)	Event	Qualifying	Repechage	Semifinal	Final
Athlete(s)	Event	Time Rank	Time Rank	Time Rank	Time Rank
Eddie Dawkins	Men's keirin	2 Q	Bye	2 Q	6
Simon Van Velthooven	Men's keirin	3 R	3	Did not advance	
Sam Webster	Men's keirin	10.577; 1 Q	Bye	10.426; 1 Q	2nd place, silver medalist(s)

Time trial

Athlete(s)	Event	Time	Rank
Matt Archibald	Men's time trial	1:01.162	3rd place, bronze medalist(s)
Simon Van Velthooven	Men's time trial	1:01.060	2nd place, silver medalist(s)
Stephanie McKenzie	Women's time trial	34.444	4

Pursuit

Athlete(s)	Event	Qualifying		Final	
Athlete(s)	Event	Time	Rank	Opposition Time	Rank
Patrick Bevin	Men's individual pursuit	4:26.909	7	Did not advance	
Dylan Kennett	Men's individual pursuit	4:26.930	8	Did not advance	
Marc Ryan	Men's individual pursuit	4:22.511	4 Q	Doull (WAL); W 4:23.559	3rd place, bronze medalist(s)
Lauren Ellis	Women's individual pursuit	3:39.716	9	Did not advance	
Jaime Nielsen	Women's individual pursuit	3:34.342	5	Did not advance	
Georgia Williams	Women's individual pursuit	3:45.334	16	Did not advance	
Shane Archbold; Pieter Bulling; Dylan Kennett; Marc Ryan	Men's team pursuit	4:00.501	3	Canada	3rd place, bronze medalist(s)

Points race

Athlete(s)	Event	Qualifying		Final	
Athlete(s)	Event	Points	Rank	Points	Rank
Shane Archbold	Men's points race	20	3 Q	14	9
Aaron Gate	Men's points race	23	4 Q	82	3rd place, bronze medalist(s)
Tom Scully	Men's points race	28	1 Q	98	1st place, gold medalist(s)
Rushlee Buchanan	Women's points race	—N/a		28	=5
Lauren Ellis	Women's points race	—N/a		25	=7
Georgia Williams	Women's points race	—N/a		1	=13

Scratch race

Athlete(s)	Event	Qualifying	Final
Shane Archbold	Men's scratch race		1st place, gold medalist(s)
Dylan Kennett	Men's scratch race		12
Tom Scully	Men's scratch race		8
Rushlee Buchanan	Women's scratch race	—N/a	12
Lauren Ellis	Women's scratch race	—N/a	9
Georgia Williams	Women's scratch race	—N/a	20

== Diving ==
Athlete	Event	Qualifying		Final	
Athlete	Event	Points	Rank	Points	Rank
Li Feng Yang	Men's 3 m springboard	375.30	9 Q	320.10	12
Li Feng Yang	Men's 10 m platform	391.70	7	379.95	8
Liam Stone	Men's 1 m springboard	343.35	6 Q	382.10	7
Liam Stone	Men's 3 m springboard	351.55	14	Did not advance	
Li Feng Yang; Liam Stone	Men's synchronised 3 m springboard	—N/a		336.42	6

== Gymnastics ==
The NZOC announced the team on 13 June 2014.

=== Artistic ===
==== Men ====
Team

Athlete	Event	Apparatus						Total	Rank
Athlete	Event	Floor	Pommel horse	Rings	Vault	Parallel bars	Horizontal bar	Total	Rank
David Bishop	Team	14.366	12.533	12.933	13.816	13.033	12.066	78.747	11 Q
Kristofer Done	Team	12.100	12.566	13.300	13.633	13.933	12.866	78.398	12 Q
Mikhail Koudinov	Team	13.258	13.083	13.333	13.366	13.566	10.333	76.939	17 Q
Reid McGowan	Team	—N/a	11.033	—N/a		12.900	13.133	—N/a	
Matthew Palmer	Team	11.933	—N/a	14.500	13.566	—N/a		—N/a	
Total	Team	39.724	38.182	41.133	41.015	40.532	38.065	238.651	6

Individual all-around

Athlete	Event	Apparatus						Total	Rank
Athlete	Event	Floor	Pommel horse	Rings	Vault	Parallel bars	Horizontal bar	Total	Rank
David Bishop	Individual all-around	12.833	12.666	12.566	14.125	13.400	13.666	79.256	12
Kristofer Done	Individual all-around	12.166	12.466	13.333	13.633	14.300	13.900	79.798	10
Mikhail Koudinov	Individual all-around	14.100	12.800	13.533	13.966	14.666	12.666	81.731	8

Individual

Athlete	Event	Points	Rank
David Bishop	Floor	14.550	3rd place, bronze medalist(s)
Matthew Palmer	Rings	14.166	8

==== Women ====
Courtney McGregor suffered a knee injury and withdrew from participating on 28 July, the day of the first event.

Team

Athlete	Event	Apparatus				Total	Rank
Athlete	Event	Floor	Vault	Uneven bars	Balance beam	Total	Rank
Brittany Robertson	Team	12.958	13.966	11.866	11.700	50.490	13 Q
Mackenzie Slee	Team	—N/a	13.466	—N/a		—N/a	
Charlotte Sullivan	Team	13.466	13.800	11.766	12.766	51.798	9 Q
Anna Tempero	Team	—N/a		11.733	—N/a	—N/a	
Total	Team	26.424	41.232	35.365	24.466	127.487	12

Individual all-around

Athlete	Event	Apparatus				Total	Rank
Athlete	Event	Floor	Vault	Uneven bars	Balance beam	Total	Rank
Brittany Robertson	Individual all-around	12.733	13.700	12.433	11.816	50.682	12
Charlotte Sullivan	Individual all-around	11.800	13.366	12.066	11.866	49.098	16

Individual

Athlete	Event	Points	Rank
Charlotte Sullivan	Floor	13.033	7

=== Rhythmic ===
Athlete	Event	Apparatus				Total	Rank
Athlete	Event	Hoop	Ball	Clubs	Ribbon	Total	Rank
Amelia Coleman	Women's individual all-around	11.100	10.650	11.900	11.400	45.050	23
Kelly McDonald	Women's individual all-around	11.700	10.275	9.600	9.125	40.700	26

== Hockey ==
=== Men ===
Team

Phil Burrows, Marcus Child, Simon Child, Dean Couzins (c), Steve Edwards, Nick Haig, Andy Hayward, Blair Hilton, Hugo Inglis, Devon Manchester, Shea McAleese, Shay Neal, Arun Panchia, Alex Shaw, Bradley Shaw, Blair Tarrant

Pool B

Team	Pld	W	D	L	GF	GA	GD	Pts	Qualification
New Zealand	4	4	0	0	19	3	+16	12	Semi-finals
England	4	3	0	1	18	5	+13	9	Semi-finals
Canada	4	1	0	3	5	9	−4	3	
Malaysia	4	1	0	3	6	18	−12	3	
Trinidad and Tobago	4	1	0	3	6	19	−13	3	

Source: FIH

24 July 2014
21:00

New Zealand	3–1	Canada
Hayward 3'; Panchia 58'; A. Shaw 64'	Report	Panesar 20'

Umpires:
Martin Madden (SCO)
Eric Koh (MAS)

26 July 2014
09:00

New Zealand	8–0	Trinidad and Tobago
Burrows 7'; Haig 24', 34'; Neal 30', 68'; S. Child 40'; Inglis 54'; A. Shaw 59'	Report

Umpires:
Raghu Prasad (IND)
Will Drury (WAL)

29 July 2014
09:00

New Zealand	2–1	England
Hayward 51'; S. Child 68'	Report	Dixon 59'

Umpires:
Adam Kearns (AUS)
Peter Wright (RSA)

31 July 2014
11:00

Malaysia	1–6	New Zealand
Rahim 59'	Report	Hayward 4', 48'; B. Shaw 29'; Haig 42'; Inglis 45'; McAleese 49'

Umpires:
Dan Barstow (ENG)
Haider Rasool (PAK)

Semifinal

2 August 2014
12:15

New Zealand	2–3	India
S. Child 2'; Haig 18'	Report	R. Singh 28'; Ra. Singh 42'; A. Singh 47'

Umpires:
Adam Kearns (AUS)
Dan Barstow (ENG)

Bronze medal match

3 August 2014
10:00

(bronze) England	3–3	New Zealand
Brogdon 29'; Jackson 30', 38'	Report	S. Child 12', 59'; Hayward 33'
Penalties
Jackson (penalty shoot-out scored); Catlin (penalty shoot-out scored); Middleton (penalty shoot-out scored); Jackson (penalty shoot-out scored)	4–2	(penalty shoot-out scored) Inglis; (penalty shoot-out missed) Hilton; (penalty shoot-out scored) Edwards; (penalty shoot-out missed) S. Child

Umpires:
Adam Kearns (AUS)
Peter Wright (RSA)

=== Women ===
The NZOC announced the team on 26 June 2014.

Team

Sam Charlton, Sophie Cocks, Rhiannon Dennison, Gemma Flynn, Krystal Forgesson, Katie Glynn, Jordan Grant, Rose Keddell, Olivia Merry, Stacey Michelsen, Emily Naylor, Anita Punt, Sally Rutherford, Liz Thompson, Petrea Webster, Kayla Whitelock (c)

Pool A

Team	Pld	W	D	L	GF	GA	GD	Pts	Qualification
New Zealand	4	4	0	0	25	1	+24	12	Semi-finals
South Africa	4	3	0	1	22	4	+18	9	Semi-finals
India	4	2	0	2	20	8	+12	6	
Canada	4	1	0	3	6	13	−7	3	
Trinidad and Tobago	4	0	0	4	1	48	−47	0	

25 July 2014
19:00

New Zealand	14–0	Trinidad and Tobago
Punt 3', 39'; Naylor 5'; Forgesson 5', 37', 49', 50'; Keddell 8'; Cocks 15'; Glynn 27', 42', 67'; Whitelock 35'; Webster 52'	Report

Umpires:
Alex Walker (SCO)
Wendy Stewart (CAN)

27 July 2014
16:00

India	0–3	New Zealand
	Report	Flynn 3'; Punt 47', 53'

Umpires:
Kylie Seymour (AUS)
Nur Hafizah Azman (MAS)

28 July 2014
21:00

South Africa	1–2	New Zealand
Bright 33'	Report	Punt 12'; Forgesson 51'

Umpires:
Kylie Seymour (AUS)
Dino Willox (WAL)

30 July 2014
14:00

New Zealand	6–0	Canada
Punt 1', 60'; Webster 16'; Forgesson 23', 48'; Whitelock 41'	Report

Umpires:
Nor Hafizah Azman (MAS)
Annelize Rostron (RSA)

Semifinal

1 August 2014
14:30

New Zealand	1–1	England
Glynn 68'	Report	Owsley 28'
Penalties
Whitelock (penalty shoot-out scored); Punt (penalty shoot-out missed); Glynn (penalty shoot-out missed); Michelsen (penalty shoot-out missed)	1–3	Twigg (penalty shoot-out scored); Danson (penalty shoot-out scored); Gilbert (penalty shoot-out scored); Bray (penalty shoot-out missed)

Umpires:
Annelize Rostron (RSA)
Kylie Seymour (AUS)

Bronze medal match

2 August 2014
18:00

South Africa	2–5	New Zealand (bronze)
Cox 24'; Taylor 49'	Report	Punt 6'; Forgesson 27'; Grant 55', 68'; Flynn 63'

Umpires:
Sarah Wilson(SCO)
Kylie Seymour (AUS)

== Judo ==
The NZOC announced the team on 16 May 2014.

Athlete	Event	Round of 32	Round of 16	Quarter Final	Semifinal / Repechage	Final / Bronze medal	Rank
Athlete	Event	Opposition Result	Opposition Result	Opposition Result	Opposition Result	Opposition Result	Rank
Chanel Kavanagh	Women's 48 kg	—N/a	Bye	Okey (BAR); L 0001–0102	Monabang (CMR); L 0001–1011	Did not advance	
Darcina Manuel	Women's 57 kg	—N/a	Bye	Inglis (SCO); L 0003–0011	Sylva (MRI); W 0001–0003	Klimkait (CAN); W 1001–0001	3rd place, bronze medalist(s)
Moira de Villiers	Women's 70 kg	—N/a	Bye	Burgess (CAN); W 1010–0000	Arscott (AUS); W 0000–0002	Fletcher (AUS); L 0000–1000	2nd place, silver medalist(s)
Adrian Leat	Men's 73 kg	Dodge (WAL); W	Mbarouk (TAN); W 1000–0002	Nartey (GHA); W 1000–0003	van Zyl (RSA); W 1100–0001	Williams (ENG); L 0002–0102	2nd place, silver medalist(s)
Mark Brewer	Men's 81 kg	Bye	Philoe (SEY); W 1010–0000	Krieber-Gagnon (CAN); L 0001–0000	Nicola (CYP); L 0001–1000	Did not advance	
Ivica Pavlinic	Men's 81 kg	Bye	Burt (CAN); L 0000–1000	Did not advance			
Ryan Dill-Russell	Men's 90 kg	—N/a	Bye	Wickramage (SRI); W 1000–0002	Piontek (RSA); L 0001–1002	Hall (ENG); L 0001–1002	5
Jason Koster	Men's 100 kg	—N/a	Bye	Pathania (IND); W 1020–0003	Burton (SCO); L 1100–0001	Didler (AUS); W 0001–0003	3rd place, bronze medalist(s)
Tim Slyfield	Men's 100 kg	—N/a	Bye	Rancev (WAL); W 0013–0001	Hussain Shah (PAK); L 0003–0002	Pathania (IND); W 1001–0002	3rd place, bronze medalist(s)
Samuel Rosser	Men's +100 kg	—N/a	Bye	Kumar (IND); W 1010–0000	Sherrington (SCO); 0000–1001	Shaw (WAL); 0002–1001	5

== Lawn bowls ==
Men

Athlete	Event	Group stage							Quarterfinals	Semifinals	Final / BM	
Athlete	Event	Opposition Score	Opposition Score	Opposition Score	Opposition Score	Opposition Score	Opposition Score	Rank	Opposition Score	Opposition Score	Opposition Score	Rank
Shannon McIlroy	Singles	Gabriel (SAM); W 21–10	McHugh (NIR); W 21–7	Juni (PNG); W 21–13	Callus (MLT); W 21–2	Christian (NFI); W 21–20	de Sousa (JER); L 19–21	1 Q	Tolchard (ENG); W 21–12	Bester (CAN); L 10–21	Sherriff (AUS); L 8–21	4
Richard Girvan; Blake Signal	Pairs	Niue; W 14–11	South Africa; W 16–8	Zambia; W 25–10	Scotland; L 11–19	—N/a		2 Q	Scotland; L 9–25	Did not advance		
Ali Forsyth; Shannon McIlroy; Tony Grantham	Triples	Guernsey; W 16–13	Norfolk Island; W 29–6	Zambia; W 26–10	Canada; W 20–16	Jersey; W 22–9	—N/a	1 Q	South Africa; L 17–19	Did not advance		
Ali Forsyth; Richard Girvan; Blake Signal; Tony Grantham	Four	Norfolk Island; W 26–9	Malaysia; D 14–14	Papua New Guinea; L 12–16	Australia; L 9–16	—N/a		3	Did not advance			

Women

Athlete	Event	Group stage					Quarterfinals	Semifinals	Final / BM	
Athlete	Event	Opposition Score	Opposition Score	Opposition Score	Opposition Score	Rank	Opposition Score	Opposition Score	Opposition Score	Rank
Jo Edwards	Singles	Saikia (IND); W 21–10	Rereiti (NIU); W 21–8	Ahmad (MAS); W 21–17	Anderson (NFI); W 21–16	1 Q	Anderson (NFI); W 21–17	McMillen (NIR); W 21–8	Melmore (ENG); W 21–15	1st place, gold medalist(s)
Jo Edwards; Val Smith	Pairs	Kenya; W 21–14	India; W 24–11	Fiji; W 16–9	Jersey; W 18–13	1 Q	Northern Ireland; L 10–14	Did not advance		
Mandy Boyd; Selina Goddard; Amy McIlroy	Triples	Cook Islands; W 21–7	Zambia; W 22–10	Fiji; W 21–11	Canada; W 23–12	1 Q	Wales; L 13–14	Did not advance		
Mandy Boyd; Selina Goddard; Amy McIlroy; Val Smith	Four	Zambia; W 22–13	Wales; W 13–6	—N/a		1 Q	Zambia; W 16–5	Malaysia; L 11–13	Scotland; W 21–15	3rd place, bronze medalist(s)

Para

Athlete	Event	Group stage				Semifinal	Final / BM	
Athlete	Event	Opposition Score	Opposition Score	Opposition Score	Rank	Opposition Score	Opposition Score	Rank
Peter Blick; Sue Curran; Christine Foster; David Stallard	Mixed para pairs	Malaysia; W 11–8	South Africa; L 7–14	Canada; W 20–10	2 BM	—N/a	Australia; L 11–14	4
Lynda Bennett; Mark Noble; Barry Wynks	Open para triples	Australia; W 11–8	South Africa; D 10–10	—N/a	2 Q	Scotland; W	South Africa; L 11–13	2nd place, silver medalist(s)

== Netball ==
The NZOC announced the team on 10 June 2014.

Team

Jodi Brown, Leana de Bruin, Shannon Francois, Katrina Grant, Ellen Halpenny, Anna Harrison, Joline Henry, Casey Kopua (c), Laura Langman, Cathrine Latu, Liana Leota, Maria Tutaia

Pool A

Team	Pld	W	L	PF	PA	PD	Pts	Qualification
New Zealand	5	5	0	337	151	+186	10	Semi-finals
Jamaica	5	4	1	344	184	+160	8	Semi-finals
Malawi	5	3	2	299	244	+55	6	
Northern Ireland	5	2	3	211	286	−75	4	
Scotland	5	1	4	165	268	−103	2	
Saint Lucia	5	0	5	141	364	−223	0	

Source: glasgow2014.com

25 July 2014
09:30

Report
New Zealand
50 – 47
Malawi

SECC Precinct
Umpires:
Sharon Kelly (AUS)
Terrence Peart (JAM)
Reserve umpire:
Tracy Smith (ENG)
Brown 8/14 (57%)
Latu 30/31 (97%)
Tutaia 12/15 (80%)

Kumwenda 38/39 (97%)
Ngwira 0/1 (0%)
Simtowe 9/11 (82%)

26 July 2014
11:30

Report
Scotland
14 – 71
New Zealand

SECC Precinct
Umpires:
Tracy Smith (ENG)
Gary Burgess (ENG)
Reserve umpire:
Terrence Peart (JAM)
Gallagher 3/7 (43%)
MacDonald 1/3 (33%)
McNeill 0/2 (0%)
Pettitt 10/16 (63%)

Brown 14/22 (64%)
Halpenny 14/18 (78%)
Latu 30/31 (97%)
Tutaia 13/17 (76%)

27 July 2014
19:00

Report
Northern Ireland
29 – 78
New Zealand

SECC Precinct
Umpires:
Michelle Phippard (AUS)
Marie-Louw van der Merve (RSA)
Reserve umpire:
Clare McCabe (AUS)
Lennon 17/22 (77%)
McCullough 5/14 (36%)
Somerville 7/9 (78%)

Brown 45/52 (87%)
Francois 0/1 (0%)
Latu 32/34 (94%)
Tutaia 1/2 (50%)

29 July 2014
11:30

Report
New Zealand
88 – 19
Saint Lucia

SECC Precinct
Umpires:
Theresa Prince (RSA)
Gary Burgess (ENG)
Reserve umpire:
Terrence Peart (JAM)
Brown 54/66 (82%)
Halpenny 15/18 (83%)
Leota 19/26 (73%)

Altifois-Fenelon 1/1 (100%)
Hippolyte 4/5 (80%)
Laurencin 1/1 (100%)
Maxwell 13/21 (62%)

30 July 2014
11:30

Report
New Zealand
50 – 42
Jamaica

SECC Precinct
Umpires:
Sharon Kelly (AUS)
Michelle Phippard (AUS)
Reserve umpire:
Clare McCabe (AUS)
Brown 29/41 (71%)
Halpenny 21/28 (75%)

Beckford 7/8 (88%)
Reid 35/39 (90%)

Semifinal

2 August 2014
10:00

Report
New Zealand
35 – 34
England

SECC Precinct
Umpires:
Sharon Kelly (AUS)
Michelle Phippard (AUS)
Reserve umpire:
Rachael Ayre (AUS)
Brown 16/20 (80%)
Halpenny 4/6 (67%)
Tutaia 15/25 (60%)

K. Corbin 14/22 (64%)
Harten 20/25 (80%)

Gold medal match

3 August 2014
12:30

Report
(silver) New Zealand
40 – 58
Australia (gold)

SSE Hydro
Umpires:
Ian Fuller (ENG)
Gary Burgess (ENG)
Reserve umpire:
Terrence Peart (JAM)
Brown 11/16 (69%)
Latu 7/7 (100%)
Tutaia 22/31 (71%)

Bassett 49/53 (92%)
Medhurst 9/11 (82%)

== Rugby sevens ==
The NZOC announced the team on 7 July 2014.

Team

Pita Ahki, Scott Curry, Sam Dickson, DJ Forbes (c), Bryce Heem, Akira Ioane, Gillies Kaka, Ben Lam, Tim Mikkelson, Declan O'Donnell, Sherwin Stowers, Joe Webber

Pool A

Team	Pld	W	D	L	PF	PA	PD	Pts	Qualification
New Zealand	3	3	0	0	115	14	+101	9	Medal competition
Scotland	3	2	0	1	91	22	+69	7	Medal competition
Canada	3	1	0	2	73	65	+8	5	Bowl competition
Barbados	3	0	0	3	5	183	−178	3	Bowl competition

26 July 2014
10:32

New Zealand	39–0	Canada
	Report

Ibrox Stadium, Glasgow

26 July 2014
13:56

New Zealand	17–14	Scotland
	Report

Ibrox Stadium, Glasgow

26 July 2014
20:20

New Zealand	59–0	Barbados
	Report

Ibrox Stadium, Glasgow

Quarter final

27 July 2014
12:06

New Zealand	19–7	Kenya
	Report

Ibrox Stadium, Glasgow

Semi-final

27 July 2014
18:44

New Zealand	19–7	Australia
	Report

Ibrox Stadium, Glasgow

Gold medal match

27 July 2014
21:37

New Zealand	12–17	South Africa
	Report

Ibrox Stadium, Glasgow, Scotland

== Shooting ==
Men

Athlete	Event	Qualification		Semifinal		Final	
Athlete	Event	Points	Rank	Points	Rank	Points	Rank
Ricky Zhao	10 m air pistol	559	18	Did not advance			
Ricky Zhao	50 m pistol	505	17	Did not advance			
Martin Hunt	50 m rifle prone	615.4	13	—N/a		Did not advance	
Ryan Taylor	50 m rifle prone	619.3	6 Q	—N/a		118.5	6
Miles Brown-Cole	Trap	106	18	Did not advance			
Mike Collings	Queen's prize individual	—N/a				378-27v	20
John Snowden	Queen's prize individual	—N/a				383-21v	18
Mike Collings; John Snowden	Queen's prize pairs	—N/a				583-44v	8

Women

Athlete	Event	Qualification		Semifinal		Final	
Athlete	Event	Points	Rank	Points	Rank	Points	Rank
Jenna McKenzie	10 m air rifle	403.8	20	Did not advance			
Jenna McKenzie	50 m rifle prone	—N/a				612.2	14
Sally Johnston	50 m rifle prone	—N/a				620.7 GR	1st place, gold medalist(s)
Jenna McKenzie	50 m rifle three positions	568	=7 Q	—N/a		385.6	7
Natalie Rooney	Trap	67	=4 Q	9	4 BM	12	4

== Squash ==
The NZOC announced the team on 20 May 2013.

Singles

Player(s)	Event	Round of 64	Round of 32	Round of 16	Quarter Final	Semifinal	Final	Rank
Player(s)	Event	Opposition Result	Opposition Result	Opposition Result	Opposition Result	Opposition Result	Opposition Result	Rank
Paul Coll	Men's singles	Kamara (SLE); W 11–0 11–5 11–7	Ghosal (IND); L 4–11 4–11 7–11	Did not advance				
Campbell Grayson	Men's singles	Bains (KEN); W 11–0 11–4 11–1	Franklin (BER); W 11–1 11–1 11–4	Ndhlovu (ZAM); W 11–4 11–6 11–4	Ghosal (IND); L 11–8 11–7 6–11 8–11 6–11	Did not advance		
Martin Knight	Men's singles	Suwaris (SRI); W 11–0 11–6 11–3	Moran (SCO); W 11–4 11–3 9–11 11–6	Willstrop (ENG); L 5–11 5–11 5–11	Did not advance			
Joelle King	Women's singles	Bye	Taylor (JER); W 11–2 11–3 11–2	Chinappa (IND); W 11–3 11–8 8–11 11–5	Perry (NIR); W 11–6 11–4 11–6	David (MAS); L 6–11 8–11 5–11	Waters (ENG); W 11–7 11–7 11–5	3rd place, bronze medalist(s)
Megan Craig	Women's singles	Bye	Madhani (KEN); W 11–1 11–2 11–2	David (MAS); L 7–11 6–11 5–11	Did not advance			
Amanda Landers-Murphy	Women's singles	Bye	Duncalf (ENG); L 2–11 0–11 8–11	Did not advance				

Doubles

Player(s)	Event	Group stage				Round of 16	Quarter Final	Semifinal	Final	Rank
Player(s)	Event	Opposition Result	Opposition Result	Opposition Result	Rank	Opposition Result	Opposition Result	Opposition Result	Opposition Result	Rank
Lance Beddoes; Paul Coll	Men's doubles	Graham & Gray (NFI); W 11–3 11–1	Karwalski & Cuskelly (AUS); L 5–11 8–11	Gunawardena & Suwaris (SRI); W 11–8 11–0	2 Q	Grayson & Knight (NZL); W 11–7 11–10	Selby & Willstrop (ENG); L 8–11 11–6 9–11	Did not advance		
Campbell Grayson; Martin Knight	Men's doubles	Kamara & Fayia (SLE); W WO	Franklin & Kyme (BER); W 11–5 11–3	—N/a	1 Q	Beddoes & Coll (NZL); L 7–11 10–11	Did not advance			
Megan Craig; Kylie Lindsay	Women's doubles	David & Low (MAS); L 11–7 10–11 6–11	Methsarani & Udangawa (SRI); W 11–4 11–1	Pallikal & Chinappa (IND); L 5–11 4–11	3	Did not advance				
Joelle King; Amanda Landers-Murphy	Women's doubles	Morove & Boyce (PNG); W 11–3 11–3	Waters & Beddoes (ENG); L 11–8 2–11 8–11	Clark & Gillen-Buchert (SCO); W 11–6 11–2	2 Q	—N/a	Pallikal & Chinappa (IND); L 9–11 5–11	Did not advance		
Paul Coll; Amanda Landers-Murphy	Mixed doubles	Mateku & Webb (PNG); W 11–2 11–4	Sandhu & Chinappa (IND); L 8–11 10–11	—N/a	2 Q	Clyne & Gillen-Buchert (SCO); W 11–9 9–11 11–5	Pilley & Brown (AUS); L 1–11 8–11	Did not advance		
Joelle King; Martin Knight	Mixed doubles	N. Taylor & S. Taylor (JER); W WO	Moran & Clark (SCO); W 11–3 11–3	—N/a	1 Q	Bong & Arnold (MAS); W 11–1 11–6	Sandhu & Chinappa (IND); W 7–11 11–8 11–6	Barker & Waters (ENG); L 3–11 6–11	Pilley & Brown (AUS); L 11–8 9–11 8–11	4

== Swimming ==
The NZOC announced the swimming team on 11 April 2014.

Men

Athlete	Event	Heat		Semifinal		Final	
Athlete	Event	Time	Rank	Time	Rank	Time	Rank
Mitchell Donaldson	200 m freestyle	1:49.76	11	—N/a		Did not advance	
Mitchell Donaldson	200 m individual medley	2:01.32	10	—N/a		Did not advance	
Dylan Dunlop-Barrett	200 m freestyle	1:50.23	14	—N/a		Did not advance	
Dylan Dunlop-Barrett	400 m freestyle	3:53.35	12	—N/a		Did not advance	
Corey Main	100 m backstroke	54.40	4 Q	54.28	5 Q	54.40	6
Corey Main	200 m backstroke	1:57.86	3 Q	—N/a		1:57.79	4
Glenn Snyders	50 m breaststroke	27.45	4 Q	27.43	6 Q	27.53	5
Glenn Snyders	100 m breaststroke	1:00.75	3 Q	59.98	4 Q	1:00.64	5
Glenn Snyders	200 m breaststroke	2:12.16	9	—N/a		Did not advance	
Matthew Stanley	200 m freestyle	1:47.16	5 Q	—N/a		1:48.11	7
Matthew Stanley	400 m freestyle	3:52.81	11	—N/a		Did not advance	
Dylan Dunlop-Barrett*; Ewan Jackson; Steven Kent; Corey Main; Matthew Stanley	4 × 100 m freestyle relay	3:20.94	6 Q	—N/a		3:19.88	7
Mitchell Donaldson; Dylan Dunlop-Barrett; Ewan Jackson; Steven Kent*; Matthew Stanley	4 × 200 m freestyle relay	7:19.69	4 Q	—N/a		7:14.63	5
Steven Kent; Corey Main; Glenn Snyders; Matthew Stanley	4 × 100 m medley relay	3:39.39	4 Q	—N/a		3:36.80	5

Women

Athlete	Event	Heat		Semifinal		Final	
Athlete	Event	Time	Rank	Time	Rank	Time	Rank
Lauren Boyle	200 m freestyle	1:56.82 NR	3 Q	—N/a		1:57.00	4
Lauren Boyle	400 m freestyle	4:07.06	1 Q	—N/a		4:04.47 GR	1st place, gold medalist(s)
Lauren Boyle	800 m freestyle	8:24.85	2 Q	—N/a		8:20.59	2nd place, silver medalist(s)
Nikita Howarth	100 m freestyle S8	1:21.50	5 Q	—N/a		1:19.36	5
Nikita Howarth	100 m breaststroke SB9	1:33.15	7 Q	—N/a		1:33.21	7
Samantha Lee	100 m butterfly	1:00.29	12 Q	1:00.27	12	Did not advance	
Samantha Lee	200 m butterfly	2:13.63	11	—N/a		Did not advance	
Samantha Lucie-Smith	100 m freestyle	55.71	8 Q	56.09	12	Did not advance	
Samantha Lucie-Smith	200 m freestyle	1:59.63	13	—N/a		Did not advance	
Samantha Lucie-Smith	400 m freestyle	4:16.48	15	—N/a		Did not advance	
Emma Robinson	200 m freestyle	2:01.78	16	—N/a		Did not advance	
Emma Robinson	800 m freestyle	8:41.02	=10 (Note: Emma Robinson finished in equal tenth position in the heats alongside Scotland's Aisha Thornton. Robinson defeated Thornton by less than a second in a swim-off between the two competitors to determine the second reserve for the final.)	—N/a		Did not advance	
Sophie Pascoe	100 m breaststroke SB9	1:19.71	1 Q	—N/a		1:19.36	1st place, gold medalist(s)
Sophie Pascoe	200 m individual medley SM10	2:30.12	1 Q	—N/a		2:27.74	1st place, gold medalist(s)
Laura Quilter	50 m butterfly	26.92	=10 Q	27.00	11	Did not advance	
Natasha Hind*; Samantha Lee; Samantha Lucie-Smith; Laura Quilter; Ellen Quirke	4 × 100 m freestyle relay	3:45.32	4 Q	—N/a		3:43.83	4
Lauren Boyle; Natasha Hind*; Samantha Lee; Samantha Lucie-Smith; Emma Robinson	4 × 200 m freestyle relay	8:02.28	2 Q	—N/a		7:57.47	4

Qualifiers for the latter rounds (Q) of all events were decided on a time only basis, therefore positions shown are overall results versus competitors in all heats.
* – Indicates athlete swam in the preliminaries but not in the final race.

== Table tennis ==
The NZOC announced the men's team on 6 June 2014, and the women's team on 18 June 2014.

Singles

Player(s)	Event	Group stage			Round of 64	Round of 32	Round of 16	Quarter Final	Semifinal	Final	Rank
Player(s)	Event	Opposition Result	Opposition Result	Rank	Opposition Result	Opposition Result	Opposition Result	Opposition Result	Opposition Result	Opposition Result	Rank
John Cordue	Men's singles	Deshappriya (SRI); L 1–4	Lewis (GUY); W 4–1	2	Did not advance						
Teng Teng Liu	Men's singles	Sepa Simoi (PNG); W 4–0	Naseem (MDV); W 4–0	1 Q	Drinkhall (ENG); L 1–4	Did not advance					
Phillip Xiao	Men's singles	Kasanda (ZAM); W 4–0	Mafabi (UGA); W 4–2	1 Q	Gao (SIN); L 0–4	Did not advance					
Chunli Li	Women's singles	Bye			Mogey (NIR); W 4–0	Beh (MAS); L 3–4	Did not advance				
Karen Li	Women's singles	Bye			Ho (MAS); W 4–0	Zhang (CAN); L 0–4	Did not advance				
Annie Yang	Women's singles	Grant (SLE); W 4–0	Ludlow (NIR); W 4–2	1 Q	Batra (IND); L 0–4	Did not advance					

Doubles

Player(s)	Event	Round of 64	Round of 32	Round of 16	Quarter Final	Semifinal	Final	Rank
Player(s)	Event	Opposition Result	Opposition Result	Opposition Result	Opposition Result	Opposition Result	Opposition Result	Rank
John Cordue; Peter Jackson	Men's doubles	McCreery & Robinson (NIR); L 1–3	Did not advance					
Jenny Hung; Annie Yang	Women's doubles	Phillips & Thomas (WAL); L 0–3	Did not advance					
Chunli Li; Karen Li	Women's doubles	Felix & Harvey (BAR); W 3–0	Lee & Ho (MAS); W 3–0	Feng & Yu (SIN); L 1–3	Did not advance			
Peter Jackson; Sun Yang	Mixed doubles	Henzell & Miao (AUS); W 0–3	Did not advance					
Teng Teng Liu; Karen Li	Mixed doubles	Band & le Maistre (JER); W 3–0	Shetty & Batra (IND); W 3–0	Pitchford & Ho (ENG); L 0–3	Did not advance			
John Cordue; Annie Yang	Mixed doubles	David & Lowe (GUY); L 2–3	Did not advance					
Phillip Xiao; Jenny Hung	Mixed doubles	Lartey & Kwabi (GHA); W 3–1	Ho & Luo (CAN); L 0–3	Did not advance				

Team

- John Cordue
- Peter Jackson
- Shane Laugesen
- Teng Teng Liu
- Phillip Xiao
- Jenny Hung
- Chunli Li
- Karen Li
- Sun Yang
- Annie Yang

== Triathlon ==
Individual events

Athlete	Event	Swim (1.5 km)	Bike (40 km)	Run (10 km)	Total	Rank
Tom Davison	Men's	18:55	1:18:32	DNF		
Tony Dodds	Men's	18:42	59:11	33:08	1:51:58	10
Ryan Sissons	Men's	18:40	59:14	34:10	1:53:01	13
Andrea Hewitt	Women's	19:47	1:03:44	34:51	1:59:25	4
Kate McIlroy	Women's	20:23	1:06:10	38:40	2:06:20	12
Nicky Samuels	Women's	19:39	1:03:55	39:16	2:03:52	10

Mixed relay

Athletes	Event	Total Times per Athlete (Swim 250 m, Bike 6 km, Run 1.6 km)	Total Group Time	Rank
Andrea Hewitt; Tony Dodds; Nicky Samuels; Ryan Sissons	Mixed relay	18:59; 17:45; 19:13; 18:45	1:14:42	5

== Weightlifting ==
The NZOC announced the team on 12 June 2014.

Men

Athlete	Event	Snatch	Clean & Jerk	Total	Rank
Lou Guinares	–56 kg	90 kg	116 kg	206 kg	7
Ianne Guiñares	–62 kg	109 kg	137 kg	246 kg	12
Cody Cole	–69 kg	122 kg	150 kg	272 kg	10
Mark Spooner	–69 kg	126 kg	162 kg	288 kg	6
Mathew Madsen	–77 kg	128 kg	172 kg	300 kg	6
Saxon Gregory-Hunt	–85 kg	130 kg	165 kg	295 kg	9
Richie Patterson	–85 kg	151 kg	184 kg	335 kg	1st place, gold medalist(s)
Stanislav Chalaev	–105 kg	155 kg	186 kg	341 kg	2nd place, silver medalist(s)

Women

Athlete	Event	Snatch	Clean & Jerk	Total	Rank
Phillipa Hale	–53 kg	79 kg	95 kg	174 kg	5 (Note: Hale originally placed 6th, but moved to 5th when Nigeria's Chika Amalaha tested positive for banned substances and was stripped of her gold medal.)
Lauren Roberts	–63 kg	79 kg	91 kg	170 kg	11
Bailey Rogers	–75 kg	75 kg	100 kg	175 kg	7
Tracey Lambrechs	+75 kg	101 kg	136 kg	237 kg	3rd place, bronze medalist(s)

== Wrestling ==
Only freestyle wrestling events are being held in Glasgow.

The NZOC announced the team on 23 May 2014.

Athlete	Event	Round of 16	Quarter Final	Semifinal	Final/BM	Rank
Athlete	Event	Opposition Result	Opposition Result	Opposition Result	Opposition Result	Rank
Soukananh Thongsinh	Men's 61 kg	Arzu (WAL); W 4–1	Daniel (NGR); L 0–4	Did not advance		
Craig Miller	Men's 65 kg	Adroit (MRI); W 5–0	Perera (SRI); L 1–4	Did not advance		
Stephen Hill	Men's 86 kg	Kumar (IND); L 0–4	Did not advance			
Sam Belkin	Men's 97 kg	Bye	Hosen (BAN); W 5–0	Gill (CAN); L 1–4	McCloskey (NIR); W 4–0	3rd place, bronze medalist(s)
Marcus Carney	Men's 125 kg	Bye	Moraandage (SRI); W 4–0	Tomar (IND); L 1–4	Boltic (NGR); L 0–4	5
Tayla Ford	Women's 58 kg	Bye	Holland (AUS); W 5–0	Adeniyi (NGR); L 1–4	Grundy (ENG); W 5–0	3rd place, bronze medalist(s)

== See also ==
- 2014 Commonwealth Games
