= Cycling at the 2014 Commonwealth Games – Men's sprint =

Cycling Track – Men's sprint at the 2014 Commonwealth Games
- Venue: Sir Chris Hoy Velodrome
- Dates: 24–25 July 2014
- Competitors: 28 from 13 nations

Medalists
gold medal	Sam Webster	New Zealand
silver medal	Jason Kenny	England
bronze medal	Eddie Dawkins	New Zealand

The Men's sprint at the 2014 Commonwealth Games, was part of the cycling programme, which took place on 24 and 25 July 2014.

== Results ==
=== Qualification ===
Rank	Rider	Time	Avg speed (km/h)	Notes
1	Matthew Glaetzer (AUS)	9.779	73.627	Q, GR
2	Eddie Dawkins (NZL)	9.818	73.334	Q
3	Sam Webster (NZL)	9.933	72.485	Q
4	Peter Lewis (AUS)	9.975	72.180	Q
5	Matthew Archibald (NZL)	10.055	71.606	Q
6	Philip Hindes (ENG)	10.108	71.230	Q
7	Mohd Azizulhasni Awang (MAS)	10.158	70.880	Q
8	Lewis Oliva (WAL)	10.171	70.789	Q
9	Njisane Phillip (TRI)	10.188	70.671	Q
10	Callum Skinner (SCO)	10.198	70.602	Q
11	Jason Kenny (ENG)	10.206	70.546	Q
12	Matthew Crampton (ENG)	10.213	70.498	Q
13	Muhammad Edrus Md Yunos (MAS)	10.257	70.195	
14	John Paul (SCO)	10.308	69.848	
15	Hugo Barrette (CAN)	10.316	69.794	
16	Bernard Esterhuizen (RSA)	10.317	69.787	
17	Vincent De Haître (CAN)	10.411	69.157	
18	Chris Pritchard (SCO)	10.412	69.150	
19	Joseph Veloce (CAN)	10.428	69.044	
20	Mohd Rizal Tisin (MAS)	10.575	68.085	
21	Quincy Alexander (TRI)	10.774	66.827	
22	Amarjit Nagi (IND)	11.114	64.783	
23	Amrit Singh (IND)	11.193	64.325	
24	Javed Mounter (BAR)	11.243	64.039	
25	Alan Baby (IND)	11.885	60.580	
26	Jedidiah Amoako-Ackah (GHA)	12.678	56.791	
27	Iftekhar Refat (BAN)	14.156	50.861	
28	Tarikul Islam (BAN)	14.199	50.707	

=== First round ===
Heat	Rank	Rider	Time	Avg speed (km/h)	Notes
1	1	Matthew Glaetzer (AUS)	10.252	70.230	Q
1	2	Matthew Crampton (ENG)			R
2	1	Eddie Dawkins (NZL)	10.606	67.886	Q
2	2	Jason Kenny (ENG)			R
3	1	Sam Webster (NZL)	10.308	69.848	Q
3	2	Callum Skinner (SCO)			R
4	1	Peter Lewis (AUS)	10.363	69.477	Q
4	2	Njisane Phillip (TRI)			R
5	1	Matthew Archibald (NZL)	10.621	67.790	Q
5	2	Lewis Oliva (WAL)			R
6	1	Azizulhasni Awang (MAS)	10.382	69.350	Q
6	2	Philip Hindes (ENG)			R

=== First round repechage ===
Heat	Rank	Rider	Time	Avg speed (km/h)	Notes
1	1	Matthew Crampton (ENG)	10.733	73.627	Q
1	2	Njisane Phillip (TRI)			
1	3	Philip Hindes (ENG)			
2	1	Jason Kenny (ENG)	10.735	67.070	Q
2	2	Callum Skinner (SCO)			
2	3	Lewis Oliva (WAL)			

=== Quarter-finals ===
Heat	Rank	Rider	Race 1	Race 2	Race 3	Notes
1	1	Jason Kenny (ENG)	10.909	10.405		Q
1	2	Matthew Glaetzer (AUS)				
2	1	Eddie Dawkins (NZL)	10.534	10.467		Q
2	2	Matthew Crampton (ENG)				
3	1	Sam Webster (NZL)	10.419	10.364		Q
3	2	Azizulhasni Awang (MAS)				
4	1	Peter Lewis (AUS)	10.644	10.314		Q
4	2	Matthew Archibald (NZL)				

=== Semi-finals ===
Heat	Rank	Rider	Race 1	Race 2	Race 3	Notes
1	1	Jason Kenny (ENG)		10.318	10.258	Q
1	2	Peter Lewis (AUS)	10.554			
2	1	Sam Webster (NZL)	10.931	10.163		Q
2	2	Eddie Dawkins (NZL)				

=== 5th–8th Places ===
Rank	Rider	Time	Avg speed (km/h)	Notes
5	Matthew Glaetzer (AUS)	10.507	68.525	
6	Matthew Archibald (NZL)			
7	Azizulhasni Awang (MAS)			
8	Matthew Crampton (ENG)			

=== Finals ===
Rank	Rider	Race 1	Race 2	Race 3	Notes
Gold Medal Races
1st place, gold medalist(s)	Sam Webster (NZL)	10.120 (71.146 km/h)		10.408 (69.177 km/h)	
2nd place, silver medalist(s)	Jason Kenny (ENG)		10.466 (68.794 km/h)		
Bronze Medal Races
3rd place, bronze medalist(s)	Eddie Dawkins (NZL)	10.551 (68.239 km/h)	10.502 (68.558 km/h)		
4	Peter Lewis (AUS)				
