= Barbados at the 2014 Commonwealth Games =

- CG code: BAR
- CGA: Barbados Olympic Association
- Website: olympic.org.bb

in Glasgow, Scotland
- Competitors: 61 in 12 sports
- Flag bearer: Shane Brathwaite
- Medals Ranked =35th: Gold 0 Silver 0 Bronze 1 Total 1

Commonwealth Games appearances (overview)
- 1954; 1958; 1962; 1966; 1970; 1974; 1978; 1982; 1986; 1990; 1994; 1998; 2002; 2006; 2010; 2014; 2018; 2022; 2026; 2030

Barbados competed in the 2014 Commonwealth Games in Glasgow, Scotland from 23 July – 3 August 2014.

== Athletics ==
Men

Athlete	Event	Round 1		Semifinal		Final	
Athlete	Event	Result	Rank	Result	Rank	Result	Rank
Ramon Gittens	100 m	10.34	2 Q	10.15	4 q	10.25	8
Ryan Brathwaite	110 m hurdles	13.48	1 Q	—N/a		13.63	5
Shane Brathwaite	110 m hurdles	13.54	2 Q	—N/a		13.49	3rd place, bronze medalist(s)
Greggmar Swift	110 m hurdles	13.57	1 Q	—N/a		13.74	6
Ryan Brathwaite; Shane Brathwaite; Ramon Gittens; Greggmar Swift	4 × 100 m relay						

Women

Athlete	Event	Round 1		Semifinal		Final	
Athlete	Event	Result	Rank	Result	Rank	Result	Rank
Jade Bailey	100 m	11.64	3 Q	11.74	8	Did not advance	
Jade Bailey	200 m	23.75	2 Q	24.04	6	Did not advance	
Kierre Beckles	100 m hurdles	13.32	3 q	13.38	6	Did not advance	

== Badminton ==
Men

Athlete	Event	Round of 64	Round of 32	Round of 16	Quarterfinals	Semifinals	Final	
Athlete	Event	Opposition Result	Opposition Result	Opposition Result	Opposition Result	Opposition Result	Opposition Result	Rank
Andre Padmore	Singles	P Vijayanath (SRI)						
Dakeil Thorpe	Singles	J Quintal (NFI)						
Andre Padmore; Dakeil Thorpe	Doubles	Bye	R Smith/R Middleton (AUS)					

Women

Athlete	Event	Round of 64	Round of 32	Round of 16	Quarterfinals	Semifinals	Final	
Athlete	Event	Opposition Result	Opposition Result	Opposition Result	Opposition Result	Opposition Result	Opposition Result	Rank
Mariama Eastmond	Singles	V Kessler (AUS)						
Shari Watson	Singles	L Minto (FAI)						
Mariama Eastmond; Shari Watson	Doubles	—N/a	M Beruwalage/N Murukkuwadura (SRI)					

Mixed

Athlete	Event	Group stage			Round of 64	Round of 32	Round of 16	Quarterfinals	Semifinals	Final	
Athlete	Event	Opposition Result	Opposition Result	Rank	Opposition Result	Opposition Result	Opposition Result	Opposition Result	Opposition Result	Opposition Result	Rank
Mariama Eastmond; Dakeil Thorpe	Doubles	—N/a			G Palmer/R Williams (JAM)						
Shari Watson; Andre Padmore	Doubles	—N/a			S Hardy/G Lloyd (GUE)						

Mixed team

Pool A

Pos	Team	Pld	W	L	GF	GA	GD	PF	PA	PD	Pts	Qualification
1	Malaysia	2	2	0	20	0	+20	420	202	+218	2	Quarterfinals
2	Sri Lanka	2	1	1	10	10	0	342	292	+50	1	Quarterfinals
3	Barbados	2	0	2	0	20	−20	152	420	−268	0	

Source: glasgow2014.com

Malaysia
5
Commonwealth Arena, Glasgow
24 July

Barbados
0

			1	2	3
1	(Malaysia) (Barbados)	Chan Peng Soon / Lai Pei Jing; Andre Padmore / Shari Watson	21; 11	21; 6
2	(Malaysia) (Barbados)	Chong Wei Feng; Dakeil Thorpe	21; 6	21; 7
3	(Malaysia) (Barbados)	Tee Jing Yi; Mariama Eastmond	21; 8	21; 3
4	(Malaysia) (Barbados)	Tan Wee Kiong / Goh V Shem; Dakeil Thorpe / Andre Padmore	21; 6	21; 8
5	(Malaysia) (Barbados)	Woon Khe Wei / Vivian Hoo; Mariama Eastmond / Shari Watson	21; 8	21; 7

Sri Lanka
5
Commonwealth Arena, Glasgow
25 July

Barbados
0

			1	2	3
1	(Sri Lanka) (Barbados)	Niluka Karunaratne / Thilini Hendahewa; Shari Watson / Dakeil Thorpe	21; 9	21; 4
2	(Sri Lanka) (Barbados)	Dinuka Karunaratne; Andre Padmore	21; 8	21; 7
3	(Sri Lanka) (Barbados)	Thilini Hendahewa; Mariama Eastmond	21; 11	21; 9
4	(Sri Lanka) (Barbados)	Niluka Karunaratne / Dinuka Karunaratne; Mariama Eastmond / Dakeil Thorpe	21; 5	21; 7
5	(Sri Lanka) (Barbados)	Achini Rathnasiri / Upuli Weerasinghe; Mariama Eastmond / Shari Watson	21; 12	21; 10

== Boxing ==
Men

Athlete	Event	Round of 32	Round of 16	Quarterfinals	Semifinals	Final		
Athlete	Event	Opposition Result	Opposition Result	Opposition Result	Opposition Result	Opposition Result	Opposition Result	Rank
Ricardo Blackman	Flyweight							
Cobia Breedy	Lightweight							
Anderson Emmanuel	Heavyweight							

== Cycling ==
=== Road ===
Athlete	Event	Result	Rank
Jamol Eastmond	Road race		
Jesse Kelly	Road race		
Darren Matthews	Road race		

=== Track ===
Sprint

Athlete	Event	Qualification		Round 1	Repechage 1	Quarterfinals	Semifinals	Final	
Athlete	Event	Time Speed (km/h)	Rank	Opposition Time Speed (km/h)	Opposition Time Speed (km/h)	Opposition Time Speed (km/h)	Opposition Time Speed (km/h)	Opposition Time Speed (km/h)	Rank
Javed Mounter	Men's sprint	11.243; 64.039	24	Did not advance					

Keirin

Athlete	Event	1st Round	Repechage	2nd Round	Final
Athlete	Event	Rank	Rank	Rank	Rank
Javed Mounter	Men's keirin	7 R	5	Did not advance	

Time trial

Athlete	Event	Time	Rank
Jesse Kelly	Men's time trial	1:10.545	15

Team sprint

Athlete	Event	Qualification		Final	
Athlete	Event	Time Speed (km/h)	Rank	Opposition Time Speed (km/h)	Rank
Jamol Eastmond; Jesse Kelly; Javed Mounter	Men's team sprint	49.239	8	Did not advance	

Points race

Athlete	Event	Qualification		Final	
Athlete	Event	Points	Rank	Points	Rank
Jamol Eastmond	Men's points race	-20	16	Did not advance	
Darren Matthews	Men's points race	6	5 Q	22	8

Scratch race

Athlete	Event	Qualification	Final
Athlete	Event	Rank	Rank
Jamol Eastmond	Men's scratch race	DNF	Did not advance
Jesse Kelly	Men's scratch race	DNF	Did not advance
Darren Matthews	Men's scratch race	7	9

== Judo ==
Men

Athlete	Event	Round of 32	Round of 16	Quarterfinals	Semifinals	Repechage	Bronze medal	Final	
Athlete	Event	Opposition Result	Opposition Result	Opposition Result	Opposition Result	Opposition Result	Opposition Result	Opposition Result	Rank
Asa Weithers	-66 kg	Njagi (KEN); W 1000–0000	Nandal (IND); L 0000–1001	Did not advance					
Kyle Maxwell	-73 kg	Nelson (PNG); L 000–100	Did not advance						

Women

Athlete	Event	Quarterfinals	Semifinals	Repechage	Bronze medal	Final	
Athlete	Event	Opposition Result	Opposition Result	Opposition Result	Opposition Result	Opposition Result	Rank
Onoh-Obasi Okey	−48 kg	Kavanagh (NZL); W 0102-0002	Renicks (SCO); L 000-100	Bye	Meyer (AUS); L 000-000	Did not advance	5

== Netball ==
Pool B

Team	Pld	W	L	PF	PA	PD	Pts	Qualification
Australia	5	5	0	322	185	+137	10	Semi-finals
England	5	4	1	293	160	+133	8	Semi-finals
South Africa	5	3	2	249	222	+27	6	
Wales	5	2	3	199	255	−56	4	
Trinidad and Tobago	5	1	4	167	282	−115	2	
Barbados	5	0	5	162	288	−126	0	

Source: glasgow2014.com

24 July 2014
17:00

Report
Trinidad and Tobago
38 – 37
Barbados

SECC Precinct
Umpires:
Jonathan Bredin (NZL)
Michelle Phippard (AUS)
Reserve umpire:
Theresa Prince (RSA)
Barker 4/5 (80%)
Cooper 16/21 (76%)
McCollin 18/21 (86%)

Browne 8/8 (100%)
Piggott 7/11 (64%)
Thomas 19/26 (73%)
Wharton 3/6 (50%)

26 July 2014
15:00

Report
South Africa
57 – 36
Barbados

SECC Precinct
Umpires:
Sharon Kelly (AUS)
Joshua Bowring (AUS)
Reserve umpire:
Rachael Ayre (AUS)
Bootha 20/25 (80%)
Holtzhausen 11/12 (92%)
Myburgh 9/12 (75%)
Potgieter 17/19 (89%)

Browne 23/27 (85%)
Piggott 11/20 (55%)
Thomas 2/3 (67%)

27 July 2014
11:30

Report
Barbados
27 – 77
Australia

SECC Precinct
Umpires:
Jonathan Bredin (NZL)
Ian Fuller (ENG)
Reserve umpire:
Tracy Smith (ENG)
Browne 6/7 (86%)
Piggott 2/4 (50%)
Thomas 8/11 (73%)
Wharton 11/12 (92%)

Caldwell 35/39 (90%)
Thwaits 42/50 (84%)

28 July 2014
09:30

Report
Wales
47 – 35
Barbados

SECC Precinct
Umpires:
Sharon Kelly (AUS)
Gary Burgess (ENG)
Reserve umpire:
Marie-Louw Van Der Merve (RSA)
James 7/10 (70%)
Lewis 21/30 (70%)
Moseley 19/29 (66%)

Browne 21/27 (78%)
Thomas 14/20 (70%)

30 July 2014
19:00

Report
Barbados
27 – 69
England

SECC Precinct
Umpires:
Yvonne Morgan (NZL)
Terrence Peart (JAM)
Reserve umpire:
Theresa Prince (RSA)
Browne 4/6 (67%)
Piggott 17/23 (74%)
Thomas 1/6 (17%)
Wharton 5/6 (83%)

Dunn 25/30 (83%)
Harten 33/36 (92%)
Housby 11/12 (92%)

== Rugby sevens ==
Barbados replaced Nigeria in the rugby sevens competition after that country withdrew.

Team	Pld	W	D	L	PF	PA	PD	Pts	Qualification
New Zealand	3	3	0	0	115	14	+101	9	Medal competition
Scotland	3	2	0	1	91	22	+69	7	Medal competition
Canada	3	1	0	2	73	65	+8	5	Bowl competition
Barbados	3	0	0	3	5	183	−178	3	Bowl competition

26 July 2014
12:50

Canada	68–5	Barbados
	Report

Ibrox Stadium, Glasgow

26 July 2014
18:02

Scotland	56–0	Barbados
	Report

Ibrox Stadium, Glasgow

26 July 2014
20:20

New Zealand	59–0	Barbados
	Report

Ibrox Stadium, Glasgow

== Shooting ==
Men

Athlete	Event	Qualification		Final	
Athlete	Event	Result	Rank	Result	Rank
Bernard Chase	10 metre air pistol	552	21	Did not advance	
Bernard Chase	50 metre pistol	491	20	Did not advance	
Ronald Livingstone Sargeant	10 metre air pistol	532	26	Did not advance	
Ronald Livingstone Sargeant	50 metre pistol	479	21	Did not advance	
Marlon Best	10 m air rifle	562.3	19	Did not advance	
Marlon Best	50 metre rifle prone	588.2	33	Did not advance	
Marlon Best	50 m rifle 3 positions	1049	15	Did not advance	
Louis Estwick	50 metre rifle prone	574.7	34	Did not advance	

== Swimming ==
Men

Athlete	Event	Heat		Semifinal		Final	
Athlete	Event	Result	Rank	Result	Rank	Result	Rank
Christopher Courtis	200 m freestyle	1:57.34	26	—N/a		Did not advance	
Christopher Courtis	50 m backstroke	27.70	20	Did not advance			
Christopher Courtis	100 m backstroke	59.71	22	Did not advance			
Christopher Courtis	200 m backstroke	2:13.18	15	—N/a		Did not advance	

Women

Athlete	Event	Heat		Semifinal		Final	
Athlete	Event	Result	Rank	Result	Rank	Result	Rank
Lani Cabrera	200 m freestyle	2:07.02	23	—N/a		Did not advance	
Alexis Clarke	200 m freestyle	2:14.36	27	—N/a		Did not advance	
Lani Cabrera	400 m freestyle	4:26.74	20	—N/a		Did not advance	
Alexis Clarke	400 m freestyle	4:43.90	22	—N/a		Did not advance	
Lani Cabrera	800 m freestyle	9.01.10	16	—N/a		Did not advance	
Alexis Clarke	800 m freestyle	9.38.74	17	—N/a		Did not advance	

== Table tennis ==
Men

Athlete	Event	Group stage				Round of 64	Round of 32	Round of 16	Quarterfinals	Semifinals	Final	
Athlete	Event	Opposition Result	Opposition Result	Opposition Result	Rank	Opposition Result	Opposition Result	Opposition Result	Opposition Result	Opposition Result	Opposition Result	Rank
Mark-Anthony Dowell	Singles			—N/a								
Kevin Farley	Singles			—N/a								
Trevor Farley	Singles			—N/a								
Kevin Farley; Trevor Farley	Doubles	—N/a										
Mark-Anthony Dowell; Kevin Farley; Trevor Farley	Team					—N/a						

Women

Athlete	Event	Group stage				Round of 64	Round of 32	Round of 16	Quarterfinals	Semifinals	Final	
Athlete	Event	Opposition Result	Opposition Result	Opposition Result	Rank	Opposition Result	Opposition Result	Opposition Result	Opposition Result	Opposition Result	Opposition Result	Rank
Sherrice Felix	Singles			—N/a								
Krystle Harvey	Singles			—N/a								
Anthonette Riley	Singles			—N/a								
Sherrice Felix; Krystle Harvey	Doubles	—N/a										
Sherrice Felix; Krystle Harvey; Anthonette Riley	Team					—N/a						

Mixed

Athlete	Event	Round of 64	Round of 32	Round of 16	Quarterfinals	Semifinals	Final	
Athlete	Event	Opposition Result	Opposition Result	Opposition Result	Opposition Result	Opposition Result	Opposition Result	Rank
Mark-Anthony Dowell; Sherrice Felix	Doubles							
Kevin Farley; Krystle Harvey	Doubles							
Trevor Farley; Anthonette Riley	Doubles							

== Triathlon ==
Athlete	Event	Swim (1.5 km)	Bike (40 km)	Run (10 km)	Total Time	Rank
Jason Wilson	Men's	18:37	59:19	36:30	1:55:21	18
Matthew Wright	Men's	18:56	1:02:01	34:52	1:56:51	20

== Weightlifting ==
Men

Athlete	Event	Snatch	Clean & jerk	Total	Rank
Brien Best	77 kg	115	142	257	16
Ivorn McKnee	105 kg	155	Did not finish		
