= Cycling at the 2014 Commonwealth Games – Men's keirin =

Cycling Track – Men's Keirin at the 2014 Commonwealth Games
- Venue: Sir Chris Hoy Velodrome
- Dates: 27 July 2014
- Competitors: 27 from 12 nations

Medalists
gold medal	Matthew Glaetzer	Australia
silver medal	Sam Webster	New Zealand
bronze medal	Mohd Azizulhasni Awang	Malaysia

The Men's Keirin at the 2014 Commonwealth Games, as part of the cycling programme, was held on 27 July 2014.

== Results ==
=== First round ===
==== Heat 1 ====
Rank	Rider	Notes
1	Peter Lewis (AUS)	Q
2	Bernard Esterhuizen (RSA)	Q
3	Simon van Velthooven (NZL)	R
4	Joseph Veloce (CAN)	R
5	Jason Kenny (ENG)	R
6	Amarjit Nagi (IND)	R

==== Heat 2 ====
Rank	Rider	Notes
1	Matthew Glaetzer (AUS)	Q
2	Mohd Azizulhasni Awang (MAS)	Q
3	Lewis Oliva (WAL)	R
4	Callum Skinner (SCO)	R
5	Kian Emadi (ENG)	R
6	Alan Baby (IND)	R
	Njisane Phillip (TRI)	DNS

==== Heat 3 ====
Rank	Rider	Notes
1	Sam Webster (NZL)	Q
2	John Paul (SCO)	Q
3	Matthew Crampton (ENG)	R
4	Hugo Barrette (CAN)	R
5	Muhammad Edrus Md Yunos (MAS)	R
6	Amrit Singh (IND)	R
7	Jedidiah Amoako-Ackah (GHA)	R

==== Heat 4 ====
Rank	Rider	Notes
1	Chris Pritchard (SCO)	Q
2	Edward Dawkins (NZL)	Q
3	Josiah Ng (MAS)	R
4	Shane Perkins (AUS)	R
5	Vincent De Haître (CAN)	R
6	Quincy Alexander (TRI)	R
7	Javed Mounter (BAR)	R

=== Repechages ===
==== Heat 1 ====
Rank	Rider	Notes
1	Shane Perkins (AUS)	Q
2	Muhammad Edrus Md Yunos (MAS)	
3	Simon van Velthooven (NZL)	
4	Alan Baby (IND)	

==== Heat 2 ====
Rank	Rider	Notes
1	Hugo Barrette (CAN)	Q
2	Lewis Oliva (WAL)	
3	Kian Emadi (ENG)	
4	Amarjit Nagi (IND)	
5	Javed Mounter (BAR)	

==== Heat 3 ====
Rank	Rider	Notes
1	Matthew Crampton (ENG)	Q
2	Jason Kenny (ENG)	
3	Callum Skinner (SCO)	
4	Quincy Alexander (TRI)	
5	Jedidiah Amoako-Ackah (GHA)	

==== Heat 4 ====
Rank	Rider	Notes
1	Josiah Ng (MAS)	Q
2	Joseph Veloce (CAN)	
3	Vincent De Haître (CAN)	
4	Njisane Phillip (TRI)	
5	Amrit Singh (IND)	

=== Semifinal round ===
==== Heat 1 ====
Rank	Rider	Notes
1	Mohd Azizulhasni Awang (MAS)	Q
2	Peter Lewis (AUS)	Q
3	Shane Perkins (AUS)	Q
4	Chris Pritchard (SCO)	
5	Josiah Ng (MAS)	
6	John Paul (SCO)	

==== Heat 2 ====
Rank	Rider	Notes
1	Sam Webster (NZL)	Q
2	Edward Dawkins (NZL)	Q
3	Matthew Glaetzer (AUS)	Q
4	Matthew Crampton (ENG)	
5	Hugo Barrette (CAN)	
6	Bernard Esterhuizen (RSA)	

=== Finals ===
==== 1st to 6th ====
Rank	Rider
1st place, gold medalist(s)	Matthew Glaetzer (AUS)
2nd place, silver medalist(s)	Sam Webster (NZL)
3rd place, bronze medalist(s)	Mohd Azizulhasni Awang (MAS)
4	Shane Perkins (AUS)
5	Peter Lewis (AUS)
6	Edward Dawkins (NZL)

==== 7th to 12th ====
Rank	Rider
7	Hugo Barrette (CAN)
8	Bernard Esterhuizen (RSA)
9	Chris Pritchard (SCO)
10	Matthew Crampton (ENG)
11	John Paul (SCO)
12	Josiah Ng (MAS)
