= Cycling at the 2014 Commonwealth Games – Men's 1 km time trial =

Cycling Track – Men's 1 km time trial at the 2014 Commonwealth Games
- Venue: Sir Chris Hoy Velodrome
- Dates: 26 July 2014
- Competitors: 18 from 12 nations

Medalists
gold medal	Scott Sunderland	Australia
silver medal	Simon van Velthooven	New Zealand
bronze medal	Matt Archibald	New Zealand

The Men's 1 km time trial at the 2014 Commonwealth Games, was part of the cycling programme, which took place on 26 July 2014.

== Results ==
Rank	Rider	Time	Average Speed (km/h)
1st place, gold medalist(s)	Scott Sunderland (AUS)	1:00.675 GR	59.332
2nd place, silver medalist(s)	Simon van Velthooven (NZL)	1:01.060	58.958
3rd place, bronze medalist(s)	Matt Archibald (NZL)	1:01.162	58.860
4	Ed Clancy (ENG)	1:01.439	58.594
5	Kian Emadi (ENG)	1:01.641	58.402
6	Bernard Esterhuizen (RSA)	1:02.414	57.679
7	Vincent De Haître (CAN)	1:03.317	56.856
8	Bruce Croall (SCO)	1:03.356	56.821
9	Steven Burke (ENG)	1:03.449	56.738
10	Quincy Alexander (TRI)	1:03.679	56.533
11	Josiah Ng (MAS)	1:04.309	55.979
12	Mohd Rizal Tisin (MAS)	1:04.747	55.601
13	Amrit Singh (IND)	1:06.903	53.809
14	Amarjit Nagi (IND)	1:08.117	52.850
15	Jesse Kelly (BAR)	1:10.545	51.031
16	Alan Baby (IND)	1:10.579	51.006
17	Alomgir Alomgir (BAN)	DNS	
18	Jedidiah Amoako-Ackah (GHA)	DNS	
