= Cycling at the 2014 Commonwealth Games – Men's scratch race =

Cycling Track – Men's scratch race at the 2014 Commonwealth Games
- Venue: Sir Chris Hoy Velodrome
- Dates: 27 July 2014
- Competitors: 36 from 14 nations

Medalists
gold medal	Shane Archbold	New Zealand
silver medal	Glenn O'Shea	Australia
bronze medal	Remi Pelletier	Canada

The Men's scratch race at the 2014 Commonwealth Games, as part of the cycling programme, took place on 27 July 2014.

== Results ==
=== Qualification ===
Heat 1

Rank	Rider	Laps Down	Notes
1	Andy Tennant (ENG)		
2	Peter Kennaugh (IOM)		
3	Zachary Bell (CAN)		
4	Glenn O'Shea (AUS)		
5	Martyn Irvine (NIR)	-1	
6	Nolan Hoffman (RSA)	-1	
7	Darren Matthews (BAR)	-1	
8	James McCallum (SCO)	-1	
9	Remi Pelletier (CAN)	-1	
10	Jonathan Mould (WAL)	-1	
11	Shane Archbold (NZL)	-1	
12	Thomas Scully (NZL)	-1	
	Jyme Bridges (ANT)	-1	DNF
	Geron Williams (GUY)	-1	DNF
	Amit Kumar (IND)	-1	DNF
	Sombir (IND)	-1	DNF
	Oneil Samuels (JAM)	-2	DNF
	Evan Carstens (RSA)	-1	DNF
	Steven Burke (ENG)	-1	DNS

Heat 2

Rank	Rider	Laps Down	Notes
1	Dylan Kennett (NZL)		
2	Evan Oliphant (SCO)		
3	Luke Davison (AUS)		
4	Joseph Kelly (IOM)		
5	Alex Edmondson (AUS)	-1	
6	Mark Christian (IOM)	-1	
7	Marloe Rodman (JAM)	-1	
8	Aidan Caves (CAN)	-1	
9	Mark Stewart (SCO)	-1	
10	Ed Clancy (ENG)	-1	
11	Sam Harrison (WAL)	-1	
12	Owain Doull (WAL)	-1	
	Jamol Eastmond (BAR)	-1	DNF
	Jesse Kelly (BAR)	-1	DNF
	Muhammad I'maadi Abd Aziz (BRU)	-1	DNF
	Scott Savory (GUY)	-1	DNF
	Shreedhar Savanur (IND)	-1	DNF
	Kellan Gouveris (RSA)	-1	DNF

=== Finals ===
Rank	Rider	Laps Down	Notes
1st place, gold medalist(s)	Shane Archbold (NZL)		
2nd place, silver medalist(s)	Glenn O'Shea (AUS)		
3rd place, bronze medalist(s)	Remi Pelletier (CAN)		
4	Mark Christian (IOM)		
5	Joseph Kelly (IOM)	-1	
6	Mark Stewart (SCO)	-1	
7	Sam Harrison (WAL)	-1	
8	Thomas Scully (NZL)	-1	
9	Darren Matthews (BAR)	-1	
10	Zachary Bell (CAN)	-1	
11	Ed Clancy (ENG)	-1	
12	Dylan Kennett (NZL)	-1	
13	Peter Kennaugh (IOM)	-1	
14	Martyn Irvine (NIR)	-2	
15	Owain Doull (WAL)	-2	
	Luke Davison (AUS)	-2	DNF
	Alex Edmondson (AUS)	-1	DNF
	Aidan Caves (CAN)	-1	DNF
	Andy Tennant (ENG)	-2	DNF
	Marloe Rodman (JAM)	-1	DNF
	Nolan Hoffman (RSA)	-1	DNF
	James McCallum (SCO)	-1	DNF
	Evan Oliphant (SCO)	-1	DNF
	Jonathan Mould (WAL)		DNF
