= Swimming at the 2014 Commonwealth Games – Women's 200 metre freestyle =

Women's 200 metre freestyle at the 2014 Commonwealth Games
- Venue: Tollcross International Swimming Centre
- Dates: 24 July 2014
- Competitors: 29 from 14 nations
- Winning time: 1:55.57 GR

Medalists
gold medal	Emma McKeon	Australia
silver medal	Siobhan-Marie O'Connor	England
bronze medal	Bronte Barratt	Australia

The women's 200 metre freestyle event at the 2014 Commonwealth Games as part of the swimming programme took place on 24 July at the Tollcross International Swimming Centre in Glasgow, Scotland.

The medals were presented by Gideon Sam, vice-president of the Commonwealth Games Federation and President of the South African Sports Confederation and Olympic Committee and the quaichs were presented by John Mason, board member of Glasgow 2014.

== Records ==
Prior to this competition, the existing world and Commonwealth Games records were as follows.

World record	Federica Pellegrini (ITA)	1:52.98	Rome, Italy	29 July 2009
Commonwealth record	Joanne Jackson (ENG)	1:55.54	Rome, Italy	28 July 2009
Games record	Caitlin McClatchey (SCO)	1:57.25	Melbourne, Australia	16 March 2006

The following records were established during the competition:

Date	Event	Name	Nationality	Time	Record
24 July	Heat	Siobhan-Marie O'Connor	England	1:56.58	GR
24 July	Heat	Emma McKeon	Australia	1:56.57	GR
24 July	Final	Emma McKeon	Australia	1:55.57	GR

== Results ==
=== Heats ===
Rank	Heat	Lane	Name	Nationality	Time	Notes
1	4	4	Emma McKeon	Australia	1:56.57	Q, GR
2	3	4	Siobhan-Marie O'Connor	England	1:56.58	Q, GR
3	3	3	Lauren Boyle	New Zealand	1:56.82	Q, NR
4	4	3	Jazmin Carlin	Wales	1:57.61	Q
5	3	5	Brittany MacLean	Canada	1:57.75	Q
6	4	5	Karin Prinsloo	South Africa	1:58.38	Q
7	4	2	Samantha Cheverton	Canada	1:58.61	Q
8	2	4	Bronte Barratt	Australia	1:58.71	Q
9	2	3	Caitlin McClatchey	Scotland	1:59.04	
10	2	5	Brittany Elmslie	Australia	1:59.18	
11	4	6	Ellie Faulkner	England	1:59.40	
12	2	6	Rebecca Turner	England	1:59.62	
13	3	6	Samantha Lucie-Smith	New Zealand	1:59.63	
14	3	2	Alyson Ackman	Canada	1:59.86	
15	2	7	Ellena Jones	Wales	2:00.12	
16	2	2	Emma Robinson	New Zealand	2:01.78	
17	4	7	Rachel Williams	Wales	2:01.84	
18	4	1	Lynette Lim	Singapore	2:03.91	
19	3	8	Joanna Evans	Bahamas	2:04.19	
20	3	7	Quah Ting Wen	Singapore	2:05.08	
21	4	8	Amanda Lim	Singapore	2:06.24	
22	2	1	Rachel Bethel	Northern Ireland	2:07.01	
23	1	4	Lani Cabrera	Barbados	2:07.02	
24	1	3	Matelita Buadromo	Fiji	2:07.77	
25	1	5	Olivia Plateau de Maroussen	Mauritius	2:07.98	
26	2	8	Danielle Hill	Northern Ireland	2:10.82	
27	1	6	Alexis Clarke	Barbados	2:14.36	
28	1	2	Aminath Shajan	Maldives	2:28.45	
	3	1	Sycerika McMahon	Northern Ireland		DNS

=== Final ===
Rank	Lane	Name	Nationality	Time	Notes
1st place, gold medalist(s)	4	Emma McKeon	Australia	1:55.57	GR
2nd place, silver medalist(s)	5	Siobhan-Marie O'Connor	England	1:55.82	
3rd place, bronze medalist(s)	8	Bronte Barratt	Australia	1:56.62	
4	3	Lauren Boyle	New Zealand	1:57.00	
5	2	Brittany MacLean	Canada	1:57.20	
6	6	Jazmin Carlin	Wales	1:57.26	
7	1	Samantha Cheverton	Canada	1:57.79	
8	7	Karin Prinsloo	South Africa	1:58.95	
