= Swimming at the 2014 Commonwealth Games – Women's 400 metre freestyle =

Women's 400 metre freestyle at the 2014 Commonwealth Games
- Venue: Tollcross International Swimming Centre
- Dates: 29 July 2014
- Competitors: 22 from 11 nations
- Winning time: 4:04.47 GR

Medalists
gold medal	Lauren Boyle	New Zealand
silver medal	Jazmin Carlin	Wales
bronze medal	Bronte Barratt	Australia

The women's 400 metre freestyle event at the 2014 Commonwealth Games as part of the swimming programme took place on 29 July at the Tollcross International Swimming Centre in Glasgow, Scotland.

The medals were presented by Maureen Campbell, Director of Commonwealth Games Scotland and Chair of Scottish Swimming and the quaichs were presented by Paul Bush, Director of Commonwealth Games Scotland and former chief executive officer of Scottish Swimming.

== Records ==
Prior to this competition, the existing world and Commonwealth Games records were as follows.

World record	Federica Pellegrini (ITA)	3:59.15	Rome, Italy	26 July 2009
Commonwealth record	Joanne Jackson (ENG)	4:00.60	Rome, Italy	26 July 2009
Games record	Rebecca Adlington (ENG)	4:05.68	Delhi, India	8 October 2010

The following records were established during the competition:

Date	Event	Name	Nationality	Time	Record
29 July	Final	Lauren Boyle	New Zealand	4:04.47	GR

== Results ==
=== Heats ===
Rank	Heat	Lane	Name	Nationality	Time	Notes
1	3	4	Lauren Boyle	New Zealand	4:07.06	Q
2	3	3	Remy Fairweather	Australia	4:07.35	Q
3	3	5	Bronte Barratt	Australia	4:08.81	Q
4	2	3	Brittany MacLean	Canada	4:08.84	Q
5	2	2	Hannah Miley	Scotland	4:09.30	Q
6	2	4	Jazmin Carlin	Wales	4:09.76	Q
7	3	1	Samantha Cheverton	Canada	4:09.88	Q
8	3	2	Ellie Faulkner	England	4:10.94	Q
9	2	5	Jessica Ashwood	Australia	4:11.23	
10	3	8	Ellena Jones	Wales	4:12.06	
11	2	6	Aimee Willmott	England	4:12.28	
12	3	6	Caitlin McClatchey	Scotland	4:15.36	
13	3	7	Tabitha Baumann	Canada	4:16.02	
14	1	4	Sycerika McMahon	Northern Ireland	4:16.21	
15	2	7	Samantha Lucie-Smith	New Zealand	4:16.48	
16	1	5	Joanna Evans	Bahamas	4:17.81	
17	2	8	Khoo Cai Lin	Malaysia	4:19.47	
18	2	1	Rebecca Turner	England	4:20.55	
19	1	3	Lynette Lim	Singapore	4:22.92	
20	1	2	Lani Cabrera	Barbados	4:26.74	
21	1	6	Rachel Bethel	Northern Ireland	4:34.30	
22	1	7	Alexis Clarke	Barbados	4:43.90	

=== Final ===
Rank	Lane	Name	Nationality	Time	Notes
1st place, gold medalist(s)	4	Lauren Boyle	New Zealand	4:04.47	GR
2nd place, silver medalist(s)	7	Jazmin Carlin	Wales	4:05.16	
3rd place, bronze medalist(s)	3	Bronte Barratt	Australia	4:06.02	
4	2	Hannah Miley	Scotland	4:06.21	
5	6	Brittany MacLean	Canada	4:06.53	
6	5	Remy Fairweather	Australia	4:07.65	
7	8	Ellie Faulkner	England	4:08.92	
8	1	Samantha Cheverton	Canada	4:09.85	
