= Cycling at the 2014 Commonwealth Games – Men's points race =

Cycling Track – Men's points race at the 2014 Commonwealth Games
- Venue: Sir Chris Hoy Velodrome
- Dates: 26 July 2014
- Competitors: 34 from 15 nations

Medalists
gold medal	Thomas Scully	New Zealand
silver medal	Peter Kennaugh	Isle of Man
bronze medal	Aaron Gate	New Zealand

The Men's points race at the 2014 Commonwealth Games, as part of the cycling programme, took place on 26 July 2014.

== Results ==
=== Qualifying ===
Heat 1

Rank	Name	Sprint Points	Lap Points	Total Score	Notes
1	Thomas Scully (NZL)	8	20	28	Q
2	Jonathan Mould (WAL)	8	20	28	Q
3	Shane Archbold (NZL)	–	20	20	Q
4	Remi Pelletier (CAN)	11	–	11	Q
5	Darren Matthews (BAR)	6	–	6	Q
6	Mark Stewart (SCO)	6	–	6	Q
7	Andy Tennant (ENG)	5	–	5	Q
8	Joseph Kelly (IOM)	4	–	4	Q
9	Evan Oliphant (SCO)	3	–	3	Q
10	Glenn P O'Shea (AUS)	3	–	3	Q
11	Kellan Gouveris (RSA)	1	–	1	Q
12	Owain Doull (WAL)	1	–	1	Q
13	Theuns van der Bank (RSA)	10	−20	−10	
14	Oneil Samuels (JAM)	–	−40	−40	
15	Jyme Bridges (ANT)	–	−60	−60	
16	Shreedhar Savanur (IND)	–	−40	−	DNF
17	Scott Savory (GUY)	−	−	−	DNF

Heat 2

Rank	Name	Sprint Points	Lap Points	Total Score	Notes
1	Peter Kennaugh (IOM)	9	20	29	Q
2	Mark Christian (IOM)	8	20	28	Q
3	Jack Bobridge (AUS)	8	20	28	Q
4	Aaron Gate (NZL)	3	20	23	Q
5	Zachary Bell (CAN)	6	20	20	Q
6	Sam Harrison (WAL)	9	–	9	Q
7	Miles Scotson (AUS)	7	–	7	Q
8	Alistair Rutherford (SCO)	6	–	6	Q
9	Nolan Hoffman (RSA)	5	–	5	Q
10	Aidan Caves (CAN)	4	–	4	Q
11	Marloe Rodman (JAM)	3	–	3	Q
12	Martyn Irvine (NIR)	3	–	3	Q
13	Muhammad I'maadi Abd Aziz (BRU)	1	–	1	
14	Amit Kumar (IND)	–	–	0	
15	Sombir (IND)	–	–	0	
16	Jamol Eastmond (BAR)	–	−20	−20	
17	Geron Williams (GUY)	–	−20	−20	

=== Finals ===
Rank	Name	Sprint Number												Lap Points			Total Score
Rank	Name	1	2	3	4	5	6	7	8	9	10	11	12	+	-	Balance	Total Score
1st place, gold medalist(s)	Thomas Scully (NZL)		3	3	5			5		5		2		60		60	98
2nd place, silver medalist(s)	Peter Kennaugh (IOM)			1				3	2	2	3	1	3	60		60	84
3rd place, bronze medalist(s)	Aaron Gate (NZL)	3		5			5							60		60	82
4	Owain Doull (WAL)						2			3		5		60		60	75
5	Zachary Bell (CAN)											3		40		40	45
6	Jack Bobridge (AUS)				1			1						40		40	42
7	Glenn P O'Shea (AUS)		5			5								20		20	30
8	Darren Matthews (BAR)												2	20		20	22
9	Shane Archbold (NZL)						3		5				5				14
10	Evan Oliphant (SCO)														20	-20	-20
11	Mark Stewart (SCO)				3						1			20	60	-40	-34
12	Miles Scotson (AUS)	2													40	-40	DNF
13	Aidan Caves (CAN)		2												40	-40	DNF
14	Remi Pelletier (CAN)								1		5			20	60	-40	DNF
15	Andy Tennant (ENG)						1										DNF
16	Marloe Rodman (JAM)	1													20	-20	DNF
17	Martyn Irvine (NIR)			2										20	20		DNF
18	Kellan Gouveris (RSA)					1									40	-40	DNF
19	Nolan Hoffman (RSA)														40	-40	DNF
20	Alistair Rutherford (SCO)	5													60	-60	DNF
21	Sam Harrison (WAL)												1	20	20		DNF
22	Jonathan Mould (WAL)		1			2								20	20	-20	DNF
23	Mark Christian (IOM)				2			2		1				60	20	40	DNF
24	Joseph Kelly (IOM)					3			3		2				40	-40	DNF
