= Swimming at the 2014 Commonwealth Games – Men's 200 metre freestyle =

Men's 200 metre freestyle at the 2014 Commonwealth Games
- Venue: Tollcross International Swimming Centre
- Dates: 25 July 2014
- Competitors: 37 from 24 nations
- Winning time: 1:45.08

Medalists
gold medal	Thomas Fraser-Holmes	Australia
silver medal	Cameron McEvoy	Australia
bronze medal	Calum Jarvis	Wales

The men's 200 metre freestyle event at the 2014 Commonwealth Games as part of the swimming programme took place on 25 July at the Tollcross International Swimming Centre in Glasgow, Scotland.

The medals were presented by Prince Edward, Earl of Wessex, Vice-Patron of the Commonwealth Games Federation and the quaichs were presented by Councillor Archie Graham, Board member Glasgow 2014.

== Records ==
Prior to this competition, the existing world and Commonwealth Games records were as follows.

World record	Paul Biedermann (GER)	1:42.00	Rome, Italy	28 July 2009
Commonwealth record	Ian Thorpe (AUS)	1:44.06	Fukuoka, Japan	25 July 2001
Games record	Ian Thorpe (AUS)	1:44.71	Manchester, England	31 July 2002

== Results ==
=== Heats ===
Rank	Heat	Lane	Name	Nationality	Time	Notes
1	5	4	Cameron McEvoy	Australia	1:46.39	Q
2	4	4	Thomas Fraser-Holmes	Australia	1:47.01	Q
3	3	5	Calum Jarvis	Wales	1:47.10	Q
4	5	5	Robert Renwick	Scotland	1:47.15	Q
5	5	3	Matthew Stanley	New Zealand	1:47.16	Q
6	4	5	James Guy	England	1:47.21	Q
7	3	4	David McKeon	Australia	1:47.99	Q
=8	3	3	Nick Grainger	England	1:48.98	QSO
=8	3	6	Ryan Cochrane	Canada	1:48.98	QSO
=8	4	3	Ieuan Lloyd	Wales	1:48.98	QSO
11	4	6	Mitchell Donaldson	New Zealand	1:49.76	
12	4	1	Jordan Sloan	Northern Ireland	1:50.01	
13	4	2	Dylan Carter	Trinidad and Tobago	1:50.09	
14	5	2	Dylan Dunlop-Barrett	New Zealand	1:50.23	
15	3	2	Coleman Allen	Canada	1:50.31	
16	3	7	Danny Yeo	Singapore	1:50.71	
17	5	7	Calvyn Justus	South Africa	1:50.73	
18	5	6	Lewis Coleman	England	1:50.75	
19	4	7	Lim Ching Hwang	Malaysia	1:51.39	
20	5	1	Kevin Yeap	Malaysia	1:51.42	
21	5	8	Otto Putland	Wales	1:52.06	
22	4	8	Sajan Prakash	India	1:53.82	
23	3	1	Quah Zheng Wen	Singapore	1:53.88	
24	2	4	Alex Bregazzi	Isle of Man	1:56.49	
25	2	5	Geoffrey Butler	Cayman Islands	1:57.13	
26	2	3	Christopher Courtis	Barbados	1:57.34	
27	3	8	Tom Gallichan	Jersey	1:58.01	
28	2	1	Igor Mogne	Mozambique	1:59.85	
29	2	6	Colin Bensadon	Gibraltar	2:00.99	
30	2	7	Brandon Schuster	Samoa	2:03.13	
31	2	2	Adam Viktora	Seychelles	2:04.65	
32	1	4	Israr Hussain	Pakistan	2:06.05	
33	1	3	Ammaar Ghadiyali	Tanzania	2:08.94	
34	1	5	Nisar Ahmed	Pakistan	2:12.14	
35	2	8	Nishwan Ibrahim	Maldives	2:12.60	
36	1	2	Tong Li Panuve	Tonga	2:12.70	
37	1	6	Dean Hoffman	Seychelles	2:14.60	

==== Qualification swim-off ====
Rank	Lane	Name	Nationality	Time	Notes
1	3	Nick Grainger	England	1:48.29	Q
2	4	Ieuan Lloyd	Wales	1:48.96	
3	5	Ryan Cochrane	Canada	1:49.28	

=== Final ===
Rank	Lane	Name	Nationality	Time	Notes
1st place, gold medalist(s)	5	Thomas Fraser-Holmes	Australia	1:45.08	
2nd place, silver medalist(s)	4	Cameron McEvoy	Australia	1:45.56	
3rd place, bronze medalist(s)	3	Calum Jarvis	Wales	1:46.53	
4	1	David McKeon	Australia	1:46.74	
5	6	Robert Renwick	Scotland	1:46.79	
6	7	James Guy	England	1:46.84	
7	2	Matthew Stanley	New Zealand	1:48.11	
8	8	Nick Grainger	England	1:49.69	
