= Swimming at the 2014 Commonwealth Games – Women's 800 metre freestyle =

Women's 800 metre freestyle at the 2014 Commonwealth Games
- Venue: Tollcross International Swimming Centre
- Dates: 27 July 2014 (heats); 28 July 2014 (final)
- Competitors: 18 from 10 nations
- Winning time: 8:18.11 GR

Medalists
gold medal	Jazmin Carlin	Wales
silver medal	Lauren Boyle	New Zealand
bronze medal	Brittany MacLean	Canada

The women's 800 metre freestyle event at the 2014 Commonwealth Games as part of the swimming programme took place on 27 and 28 July at the Tollcross International Swimming Centre in Glasgow, Scotland.

The medals were presented by Robert Smith, Baron Smith of Kelvin, Chairman of Glasgow 2014 and the quaichs were presented by Kenn Banks, President of the Commonwealth Games Association of Anguilla.

== Records ==
Prior to this competition, the existing world and Commonwealth Games records were as follows.

World record	Katie Ledecky (USA)	8:11.00	Shenandoah, United States	22 June 2014
Commonwealth record	Rebecca Adlington (ENG)	8:14.10	Beijing, China	16 August 2008
Games record	Tracey Wickham (AUS)	8:24.62	Edmonton, Canada	3 August 1978

The following records were established during the competition:

Date	Event	Name	Nationality	Time	Record
27 July	Heat	Jazmin Carlin	Wales	8.22.69	GR
28 July	Final	Jazmin Carlin	Wales	8:18.11	GR

== Results ==
=== Heats ===
Rank	Heat	Lane	Name	Nationality	Time	Notes
1	3	4	Jazmin Carlin	Wales	8:22.69	Q, GR
2	2	4	Lauren Boyle	New Zealand	8:24.85	Q
3	2	3	Alanna Bowles	Australia	8:25.19	Q
4	2	5	Brittany MacLean	Canada	8:27.32	Q
5	3	5	Jessica Ashwood	Australia	8:34.21	Q
6	3	7	Camilla Hattersley	Scotland	8:36.15	Q
7	3	2	Hannah Miley	Scotland	8:36.16	Q
8	3	6	Laura Crockart	Australia	8:37.22	Q
9	3	1	Ellena Jones	Wales	8:37.64	
=10	2	2	Aisha Thornton	Scotland	8:41.02	
=10	2	7	Emma Robinson	New Zealand	8:41.02	
12	3	8	Joanna Evans	Bahamas	8:41.39	
13	2	6	Tabitha Baumann	Canada	8:44.94	
14	2	1	Khoo Cai Lin	Malaysia	8:54.45	
15	1	4	Lynette Lim	Singapore	8:58.53	
16	1	5	Lani Cabrera	Barbados	9:01.10	
17	1	3	Alexis Clarke	Barbados	9:38.74	
	3	3	Ellie Faulkner	England		DNS

==== Second reserve swim-off ====
Rank	Lane	Name	Nationality	Time	Notes
1	5	Emma Robinson	New Zealand	8:41.94	
2	4	Aisha Thornton	Scotland	8:42.85	

=== Final ===
Rank	Lane	Name	Nationality	Time	Notes
1st place, gold medalist(s)	4	Jazmin Carlin	Wales	8:18.11	GR
2nd place, silver medalist(s)	5	Lauren Boyle	New Zealand	8:20.59	
3rd place, bronze medalist(s)	6	Brittany MacLean	Canada	8:20.91	
4	3	Alanna Bowles	Australia	8:24.74	
5	1	Hannah Miley	Scotland	8:28.15	
6	2	Jessica Ashwood	Australia	8:29.32	
7	7	Camilla Hattersley	Scotland	8:33.83	
8	8	Laura Crockart	Australia	8:41.64	
