= Erraid Davies =

Scottish swimmer

Personal information
- Born: 9 February 2001 (age 25) Dundee, Scotland

Sport
- Sport: Swimming
- Strokes: Breaststroke
- Club: Delting Dolphins swimming club
Medal record
Event	1st	2nd	3rd
Commonwealth Games	0	0	1
Total	0	0	1
Representing Scotland
Commonwealth Games
Bronze medal – third place	2014 Glasgow	100m Breaststroke SB9

Erraid Davies (born 9 February 2001 in Dundee, Scotland) is a Scottish swimmer from Skeld in Shetland. In 2014 at the age of 13 she became the youngest person to compete for Scotland in the Commonwealth Games and achieved a bronze medal in the SB9 category for 100m breaststroke. Her parents are Joyce and David Davies, and she has two older sisters.

== Disability ==
Davies was diagnosed with Perthes disease, a hip problem, at the age of four and was in a wheelchair for another four years.

== Swimming ==
Since being diagnosed and advised not to do any weight-bearing exercise she took up swimming so she could stay fit. She swam her first mile before the age of six.

Davies is a member of the Delting Dolphins swimming club based in Brae, which claims to be "the most northerly active swimming club in the UK". Davies trains in the afternoons and evenings in a 16.66m pool, which is a third of the length of the Olympic-sized pool in which she won her bronze medal. In June 2016 Davies was notified that she was no longer eligible to perform as a Para-sport swimmer as her impairment was now not serious enough.
