= Emma Robinson (New Zealand swimmer) =

New Zealand swimmer

Personal information
- Full name: Emma Kay Robinson
- Born: 26 September 1994 (age 32) Wellington, New Zealand

Sport
- Country: New Zealand
- Sport: Swimming
- Club: Capital Swim Club

Emma Kay Robinson (born 26 September 1994) is a New Zealand swimmer who competed for her country at the 2016 Summer Olympics in Rio de Janeiro, Brazil. She competed in the women's 800 metre freestyle but did not qualify for the final.

== Personal life ==
Robinson was born on 26 September 1994 in Wellington, New Zealand. Of Māori descent, Robinson affiliates to the Ngāpuhi iwi. She studied at the Victoria University of Wellington, where she was awarded a Blue for swimming.

== Career ==
Robinson is a member of the Capital Swim Club in Wellington. In 2013, she swam at the 15th FINA World Championships held in Barcelona, Spain. Competing in the women's 10 km open water event she placed 34th in a time of two hours one minute 47.6 seconds. In the 5 km event she finished 24th in a time of 57 minutes 29.5 seconds.

She competed at the 2014 Commonwealth Games held in Glasgow, Scotland. She swam in the 200 metre and 800 metre freestyle and in the 4 × 200 metre freestyle relay. In the 800 metre event she finished joint tenth fastest in the heats and won a swim off against Aisha Thornton of Scotland to be the second reserve for the final.

In February 2015 she moved her training base to TSS Aquatics in Southport, Queensland, Australia, after the Wellington High Performance Centre was closed and the national coach David Lyles was fired. She swam at the 16th FINA World Championships held in Kazan, Russia. In the 400 m freestyle she placed 28th in the heats in a time of four minutes 16.43 seconds. In the 800 m freestyle she finished 27th in a time of eight minutes 44.86 seconds.

At the 2016 New Zealand open swimming championships Robinson swam a personal best time of 8:31.27 in the 800 metre freestyle event to qualify for the 2016 Summer Olympics. She was subsequently selected alongside Lauren Boyle in the event.
