= Gymnastics at the 2014 Commonwealth Games – Men's floor =

Men's floor at the 2014 Commonwealth Games
- Venue: SSE Hydro
- Dates: 31 July 2014
- Competitors: 8 from 7 nations
- Winning score: 15.533

Medalists
gold medal	Max Whitlock	England
silver medal	Scott Morgan	Canada
bronze medal	David Bishop	New Zealand

The men's individual floor exercise competition of the 2014 Commonwealth Games took place on July 31 at the SSE Hydro arena in Glasgow, Scotland.

== Results ==
=== Qualification ===
Qualification took place on July 28 as part of the team and individual qualification event.

=== Final ===
Position	Gymnast	D Score	E Score	Penalty	Total
1st place, gold medalist(s)	Max Whitlock (ENG)	6.700	8.833		15.533
2nd place, silver medalist(s)	Scott Morgan (CAN)	6.400	8.733		15.133
3rd place, bronze medalist(s)	David Bishop (NZL)	5.700	8.850		14.550
4	Daniel Keatings (SCO)	6.000	8.633	0.1	14.533
5	Clinton Purnell (WAL)	5.800	8.566		14.366
6	Ashish Kumar (IND)	6.600	7.300	0.1	13.800
7	Wah Toon Hoe (SIN)	5.900	7.933	0.1	13.733
8	Kristian Thomas (ENG)	5.800	7.866		13.366
