= David Bishop (gymnast) =

New Zealand gymnast (born 1990)

- Born: 13 January 1990 (age 36) Auckland, New Zealand
- Height: 1.78 m (5 ft 10 in)

Gymnastics career
- Discipline: Men's artistic gymnastics
- Country represented: New Zealand
- Gym: Tri Star
- Head coach: David Phillips
Medal record
Men's artistic gymnastics
Representing New Zealand
Commonwealth Games
Bronze medal – third place	2014 Glasgow	Floor

David Bishop (born 13 January 1990) is a New Zealand gymnast. He competed in the Men's floor event at the 2014 Commonwealth Games where he won the bronze medal.

David trained at Tri Star gymnastics club in Auckland, coached by David Phillips (a former Commonwealth Games medallist for New Zealand)
