= Chris Pritchard (cyclist) =

English presenter and cyclist

Personal information
- Full name: Chris Pritchard
- Born: 2 January 1983 (age 43) Sheffield, South Yorkshire, United Kingdom
- Height: 6 ft 0 in (183 cm)
- Weight: 83 kg (183 lb)

Cycling career
- Sport: Cycling
- Current team: Wahoo E-Sports Team
- Disciplines: Road, Track, Virtual
- Role: Rider
- Rider type: Sprinter

Amateur teams
- ?: Stealth RT
- ?: Yasumitsu Schlaap
- ?: Science in Sport
- 2012: Cycle Premier RT
- Sep 2013 -: Glasgow Life-Track Cycling
- 2019 - 2020: TeamCyclingHub
- 2020 -: Wahoo LeCol

Professional team
- 2011: Endura Racing

Chris Pritchard (born 2 January 1983) is a presenter and a former professional cyclist who has competed on the track and the road. Born in Sheffield, England, Pritchard took up competitive cycling at the age of 25 after previously racing motorcycles.

He moved to the Cycle Premier Race Team in 2012 after a season blighted with injury for Endura Racing in 2011. He subsequently joined the Glasgow Life Track Cycling Team in September 2013. Pritchard represented Scotland at the 2010 Commonwealth Games and the 2014 Commonwealth Games in Glasgow, where he attracted attention for proposing to his girlfriend immediately after finishing his final race in the keirin competition. He qualifies to compete for Scotland through his mother, a native of Linwood, Renfrewshire.

Following a successful streaming service, Chris decided to create his own cycling-themed news show, in which he discusses the latest cycling-related news stories.
