= Lauren Boyle =

New Zealand swimmer (born 1987)

Lauren Boyle MNZM
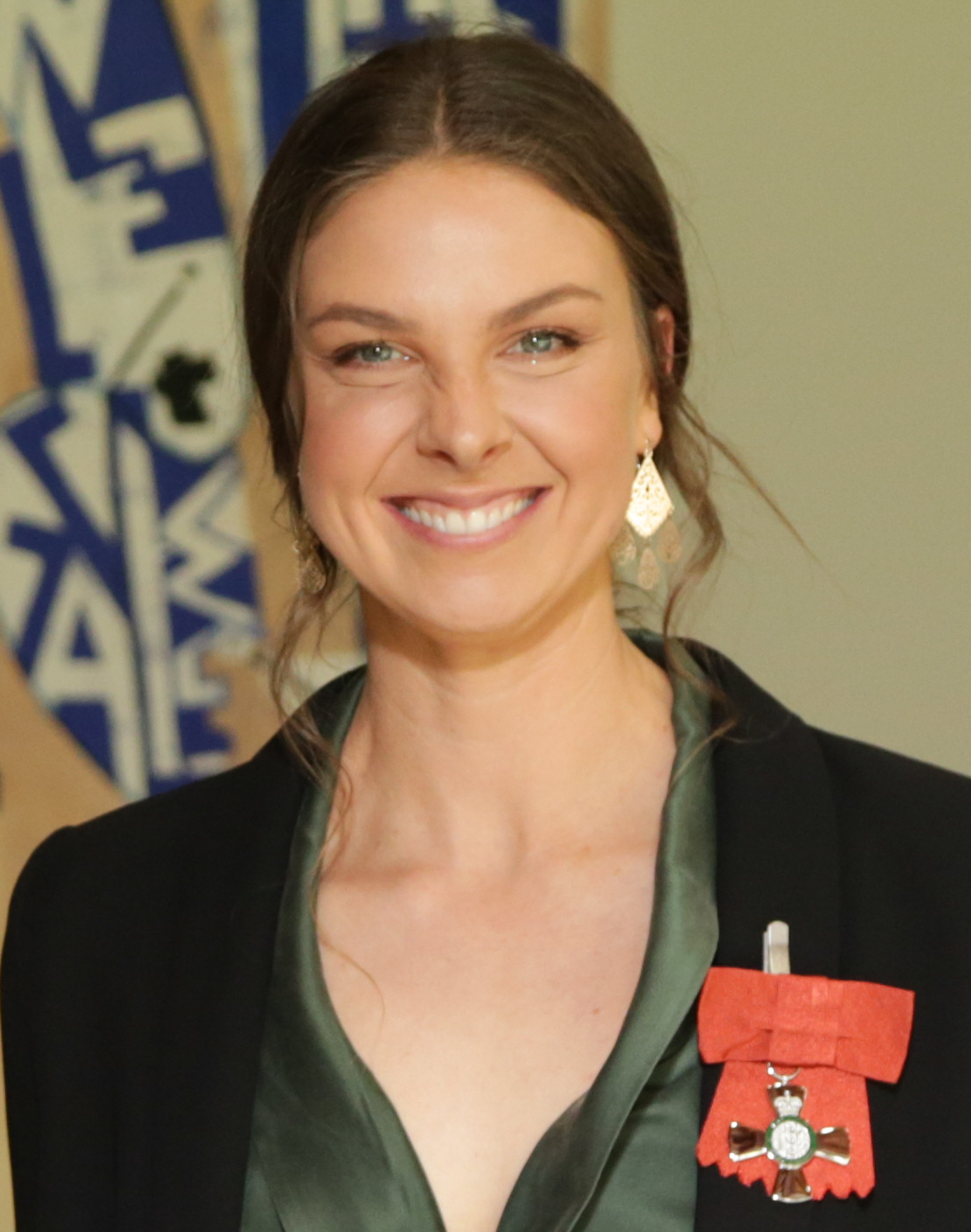
- Boyle in 2020

Personal information
- Full name: Lauren Marie Boyle
- Born: 14 December 1987 (age 38) Auckland, New Zealand
- Height: 6 ft 0 in (1.83 m)
- Weight: 67 kg (148 lb)

Sport
- Country: New Zealand
- Sport: Swimming
- Event: Freestyle
- College team: University of California, Berkeley
Medal record
Women's swimming
Representing New Zealand
Event	1st	2nd	3rd
World Championships (LC)	0	2	3
World Championships (SC)	1	0	1
Pan Pacific Championships	0	2	1
Commonwealth Games	1	2	1
Summer Universiade	2	2	1
Total	4	8	7
World Championships (LC)
Silver medal – second place	2015 Kazan	800 m freestyle
Silver medal – second place	2015 Kazan	1500 m freestyle
Bronze medal – third place	2013 Barcelona	400 m freestyle
Bronze medal – third place	2013 Barcelona	800 m freestyle
Bronze medal – third place	2013 Barcelona	1500 m freestyle
World Championships (SC)
Gold medal – first place	2012 Istanbul	800 m freestyle
Bronze medal – third place	2012 Istanbul	400 m freestyle
Pan Pacific Championships
Silver medal – second place	2014 Gold Coast	800 m freestyle
Silver medal – second place	2014 Gold Coast	1500 m freestyle
Bronze medal – third place	2014 Gold Coast	400 m freestyle
Commonwealth Games
Gold medal – first place	2014 Glasgow	400m freestyle
Silver medal – second place	2010 Delhi	4×200m freestyle
Silver medal – second place	2014 Glasgow	800m freestyle
Bronze medal – third place	2006 Melbourne	4×200m freestyle
Summer Universiade
Gold medal – first place	2011 Shenzhen	400 m freestyle
Gold medal – first place	2011 Shenzhen	800 m freestyle
Silver medal – second place	2011 Shenzhen	200 m freestyle
Silver medal – second place	2011 Shenzhen	4×200 m freestyle
Bronze medal – third place	2011 Shenzhen	1500 m freestyle

Lauren Marie Boyle MNZM (born 14 December 1987) is a former competitive swimmer from New Zealand. She has competed at three Commonwealth Games and three Olympic Games.

== Career ==
Boyle won a bronze medal with Helen Norfolk, Alison Fitch and Melissa Ingram in the 4 × 200 m freestyle relay at the 2006 Commonwealth Games.

At the 2008 Olympic Games she was a member of the New Zealand 4 × 200 m freestyle relay team which was disqualified in the heats.

She won a silver medal with Penelope Marshall, Amaka Gessler and Natasha Hind in the 4 × 200 m freestyle relay at the 2010 Commonwealth Games.

At the 2012 Olympics in London, Boyle was fourth fastest in the heats of the 400m freestyle in a New Zealand record 4:03.63. In the final she finished 8th. In the 800m heats she swam 8:25.91, also a New Zealand record, qualifying fifth fastest for the final. In the final she swam another record of 8:22.72 to finish fourth, 2.40 seconds from the bronze medal which went to defending champion and world record holder Rebecca Adlington.

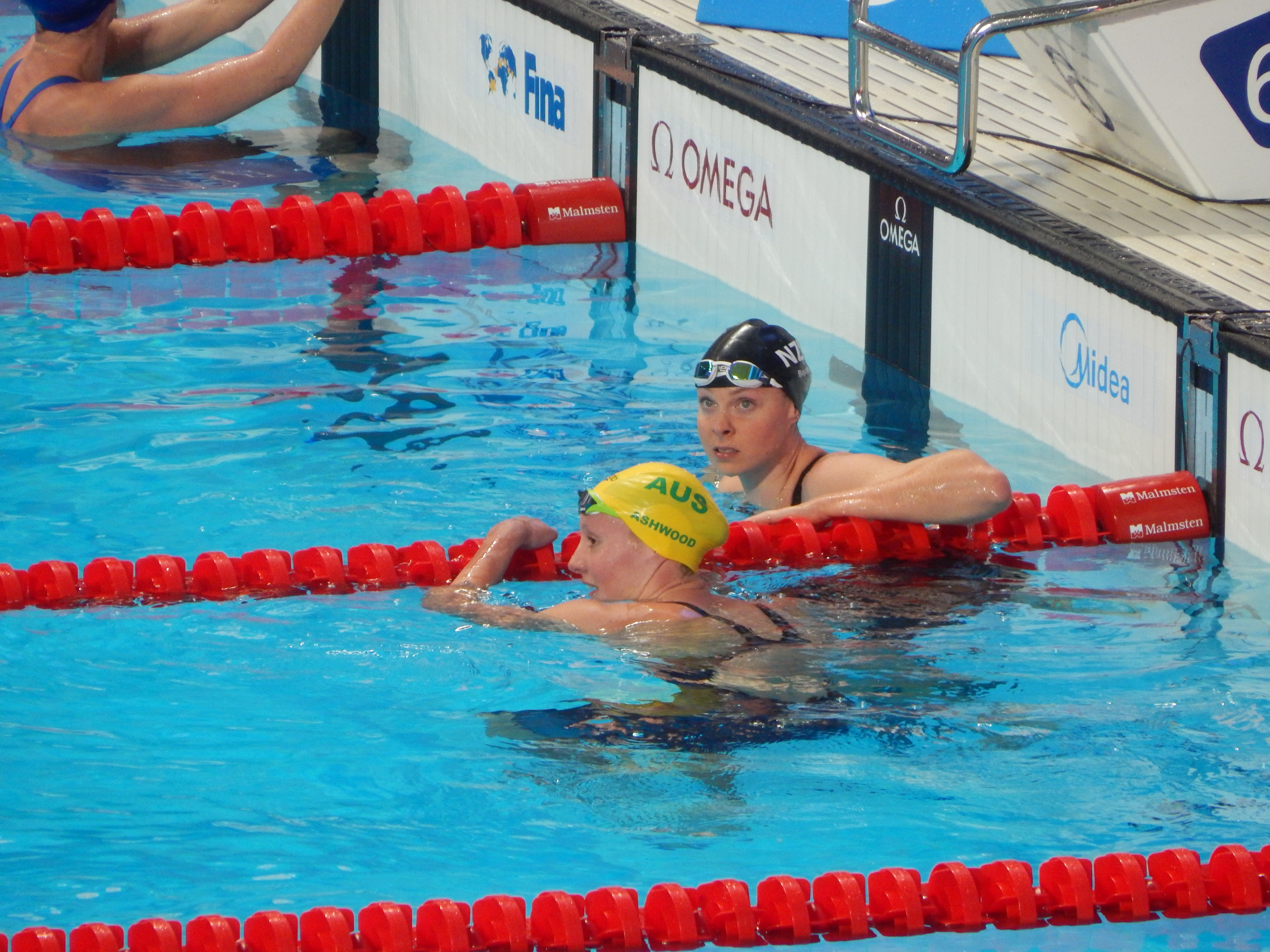
Boyle (black cap) and Jessica Ashwood (yellow cap) at the 2015 World Aquatics Championships

In August 2013, Boyle claimed three medals at the FINA World Swimming Championships in Barcelona, becoming only the second New Zealander to achieve this feat (after Danyon Loader in 1994).

At the 2014 Commonwealth Games, Boyle won gold in the 400m freestyle and a silver medal in the 800m freestyle. She also finished fourth in the final of the 200m freestyle after breaking the New Zealand record in the heats. In the 400 m freestyle, she set a new Games record in the final.

At the Wellington Winter Short Course meet in August 2014 Boyle broke the World Short Course record in the women's 1500m freestyle with a time of 15:22.68.

At the 2016 Summer Olympics, Boyle was 14th fastest in the semi-finals of the 400 m freestyle, and did not make the final. In the 800 m freestyle, she was 0.29 of a second off making the final.

Boyle is a graduate of the University of California, Berkeley. She announced her retirement from competitive swimming on 1 August 2017 due to ongoing injury problems.

In the 2020 New Year Honours, Boyle was appointed a Member of the New Zealand Order of Merit, for services to swimming.

== See also ==
- List of World Aquatics Championships medalists in swimming (women)
- List of Commonwealth Games medallists in swimming (women)
- World record progression 1500 metres freestyle

Records
Preceded by Mireia Belmonte	Women's 1500 metre freestyle world record holder (short course); 9 August 2014 – 12 December 2014	Succeeded by Mireia Belmonte
