= Chanel Kavanagh =

New Zealand judoka (born 1995)

Chanel Kavanagh (born 24 April 1995) is a judoka from New Zealand. She competed in the 2014 Commonwealth Games in Glasgow, Scotland.

Kavanagh was born in Tauranga in 1995. She started judo lessons at the Tauranga Judo Club, where her father Kevin is a coach, when she was seven years old. She competed at the 2013 World Cup OJU, finishing third, and at the 2014 Oceania Championships, finishing second in the under-48kg open event and winning the junior (under 21 years old) event. Prior to the 2014 Commonwealth Games, Kavanagh was ranked second in the Commonwealth in women's judo.

Kavanagh is an early childhood education student at the University of Waikato in Tauranga.
