= Tom Scully (cyclist) =

New Zealand racing cyclist

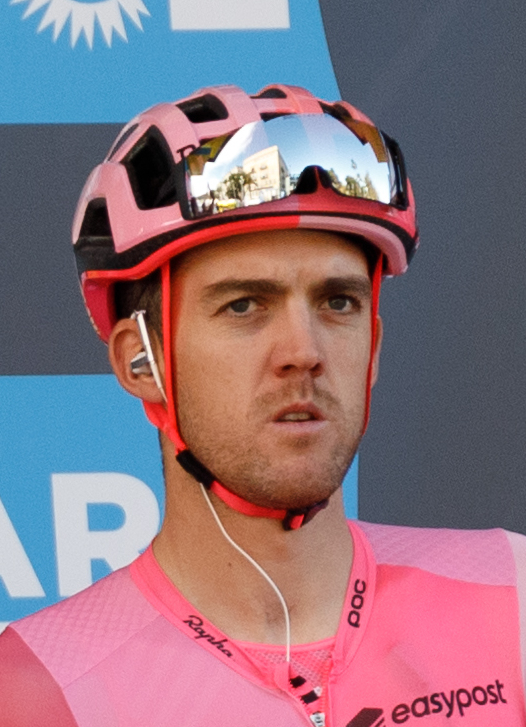
- Scully in 2023

Personal information
- Full name: Thomas Scully
- Nickname: Scud
- Born: 14 January 1990 (age 36) Invercargill, New Zealand
- Height: 1.88 m (6 ft 2 in)
- Weight: 85 kg (187 lb; 13 st 5 lb)

Cycling career
- Sport: Cycling
- Disciplines: Road; Track
- Role: Rider

Amateur team
- 2012: Garmin–Sharp (stagiaire)

Professional teams
- 2011–2012: Chipotle–Garmin Development Team
- 2013: Team Raleigh
- 2014–2015: Madison Genesis
- 2016: Drapac Professional Cycling
- 2017–2023: Cannondale–Drapac
Medal record
Representing New Zealand
Men's bicycle racing
World Championships
Silver medal – second place	2014 Cali	Points race
Commonwealth Games
Gold medal – first place	2014 Glasgow	Points race

Thomas Scully (born 14 January 1990) is a New Zealand professional road racing cyclist, who last rode for UCI WorldTeam EF Education–EasyPost. He previously competed on the track; he won the silver medal in the Men's points race at the 2014 UCI Track Cycling World Championships in Cali, Colombia, and the gold medal in the same event at the 2014 Commonwealth Games in Glasgow, Scotland, United Kingdom.

In October 2015, Scully transitioned to the road by joining Drapac Professional Cycling's line-up for the 2016 season.

== Major results ==
2012
3rd Paris–Roubaix Espoirs
2013
7th Rutland–Melton CiCLE Classic
10th Overall Tour de Normandie

1st Prologue

2014
1st Points race, Commonwealth Games
2nd Points race, UCI Track World Championships
2nd Rutland–Melton CiCLE Classic
2015
3rd Overall Tour de Normandie
6th London Nocturne
2016
1st Stage 3 Boucles de la Mayenne
2nd Time trial, National Road Championships
2017
1st Stage 4 Route du Sud
2019
3rd Road race, National Road Championships

=== Grand Tour general classification results timeline ===
Grand Tour	2017	2018	2019	2020	2021
Giro d'Italia	—	DNF	—	—	—
Tour de France	—	129	135	—	—
Vuelta a España	153	—	—	—	125

Legend
—	Did not compete
DNF	Did not finish
IP	In progress
