= Matt Archibald =

New Zealand cyclist

Personal information
- Full name: Matthew Archibald
- Born: 20 May 1986 (age 40) Hamilton, New Zealand

Cycling career
- Sport: Cycling
- Discipline: Track cycling
Medal record
Representing New Zealand
Men's bicycle racing
Commonwealth Games
Bronze medal – third place	2014 Glasgow	Time trial
World Championships
Bronze medal – third place	2015 Saint-Quentin-en-Yvelines	Time trial

Matthew "Matt" Archibald (born 20 May 1986) is a New Zealand racing cyclist.

He won the bronze medal in the Men's 1 km time trial at the 2014 Commonwealth Games. He won the bronze medal in the same event at the 2015 UCI Track Cycling World Championships.
