= Dylan Dunlop-Barrett =

New Zealand swimmer (born 1991)

Personal information
- Born: March 17, 1991 (age 35) Hāwera, Taranaki

Sport
- Sport: Swimming

Dylan Dunlop-Barrett (born 17 March 1991) is a New Zealand swimmer. He competed in the 4 × 200 metre freestyle relay event at the 2012 Summer Olympics. The New Zealand team completed the race on 31 July finishing 8th with a time of 7:17:18. Dylan had the 2nd fastest leg completing his 200 metres in 1:49.51. The other members of his team are Matthew Stanley, Steven Kent and Andy Macmillan.

He also competed in the 200 and 400 m freestyle events at the 2014 Commonwealth Games, along with the 4 × 100 m and 4 × 200 m freestyle relays.

Dunlop-Barrett won the Sportsperson of the Year overall award at the Taranaki Sports Awards in 2012. He announced his retirement from competitive swimming in 2015.
