= Shane Archbold =

New Zealand racing cyclist

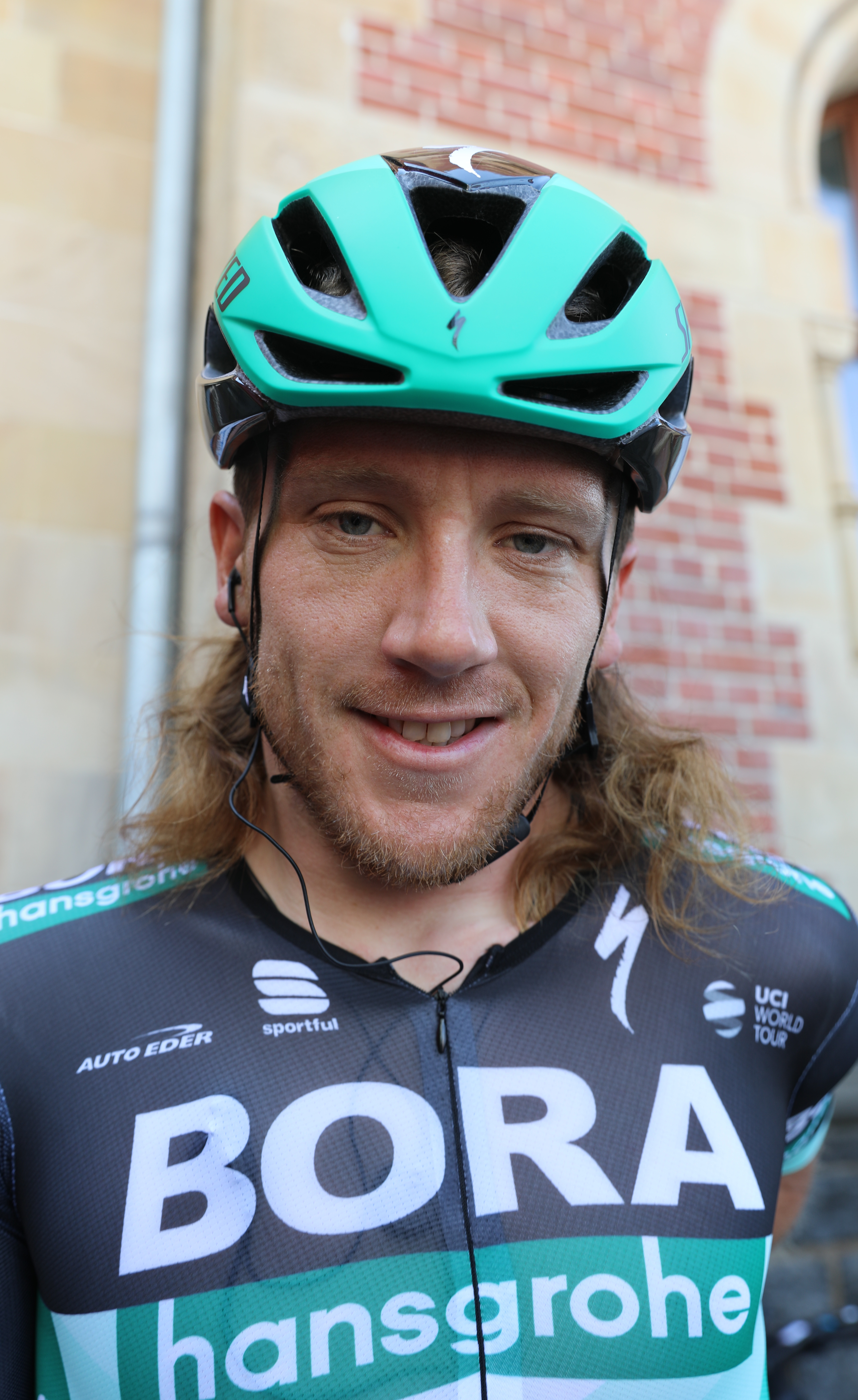
- Shane Archbold (2019).

Personal information
- Full name: Shane William Archbold
- Nicknames: Novie; The Flying Mullet
- Born: 2 February 1989 (age 37) Timaru, New Zealand
- Height: 1.82 m (6 ft 0 in)
- Weight: 80 kg (176 lb)

Cycling career
- Sport: Cycling
- Current team: Retired
- Disciplines: Track; Road
- Role: Rider
- Rider type: Lead out man

Amateur teams
- 2007: Calder Stewart Pink Batts
- 2008: Peak Fuel
- 2008: Kelford – Reiker
- 2010–2011: Powernet

Professional teams
- 2012: Marco Polo Cycling–Donckers Koffie
- 2013–2014: An Post–Chain Reaction
- 2015–2017: Bora–Argon 18
- 2018: Aqua Blue Sport
- 2019: EvoPro Racing
- 2019: Bora–Hansgrohe
- 2020–2021: Deceuninck–Quick-Step
- 2022–2023: Bora–Hansgrohe

Major wins
- One-day races and Classics National Road Race Championships (2020)
Medal record
Representing New Zealand
Men's track cycling
World Championships
| Silver medal – second place | 2011 Apeldoorn | Omnium |
Commonwealth Games
| Gold medal – first place | 2014 Glasgow | Scratch race |
| Bronze medal – third place | 2014 Glasgow | Team pursuit |

Shane William Archbold (born 2 February 1989) is a New Zealand former professional racing cyclist who competed as a professional from 2012 to 2023.

== Career ==
Born in Timaru, Archbold competed in the men's omnium at the 2012 Summer Olympics, and won the gold medal in the men's scratch race at the 2014 Commonwealth Games, along with bronze in the men's team pursuit.

He was named in the start list for the 2016 Tour de France. During the 2016 Tour de France Shane crashed early on in the 17th stage and broke his pelvis but he struggled on to finish the stage. However, he was forced to withdraw from the race four days from the finish. In October 2017 it was announced that Archbold would join Aqua Blue Sport for the 2018 season.

In August 2018, he was without a professional road team because Aqua Blue Sport folded. He decided to team up with Aaron Gate to return to track cycling and participated in Six Day London and Six Day Melbourne of 2018–19 Six Day Series with the eye of entering madison event in 2020 Tokyo Olympics. In August 2019, he was named in the startlist for the 2019 Vuelta a España.

== Major results ==
2005
1st Time trial, National Novice Road Championships
2006
2nd Team pursuit, UCI Junior Track World Championships
2007
National Junior Track Championships

1st Individual pursuit
1st Points race

Australian Youth Olympic Festival

1st Points race
3rd Individual pursuit

1st Stage 4 Tour du Pays de Vaud
2008
1st Stage 4 Tour de Vineyards
2011
1st Stage 4 Mi-Août en Bretagne
2nd Omnium, UCI Track World Championships
10th Overall Rás Tailteann
2013
1st Six Days of Fiorenzuola (with Dylan Kennett)
1st Stage 2 Rás Tailteann
2014
Commonwealth Games

1st Scratch
3rd Team pursuit

2nd Omnium, Fenioux Piste International
9th Rutland–Melton CiCLE Classic
2015
2nd Classica Corsica
3rd Grand Prix d'Isbergues
5th Omloop van het Houtland
8th Rund um Köln
2017
7th Coppa Bernocchi
2018
6th Road race, Commonwealth Games
7th Grand Prix de Denain
2019
1st Stage 2 Czech Cycling Tour
2020
1st Road race, National Road Championships
3rd Overall Okolo Slovenska
2021
9th Grote Prijs Marcel Kint
2022
National Road Championships

1st Criterium
8th Road race

=== Grand Tour general classification results timeline ===
| Grand Tour | 2016 | 2017 | 2018 | 2019 | 2020 |
|---|---|---|---|---|---|
| Giro d'Italia | — | — | — | — | — |
| Tour de France | DNF | — | — | — | — |
| Vuelta a España | — | — | — | 151 | — |

Legend
| — | Did not compete |
| DNF | Did not finish |
