= Jesse Kelly =

American radio personality

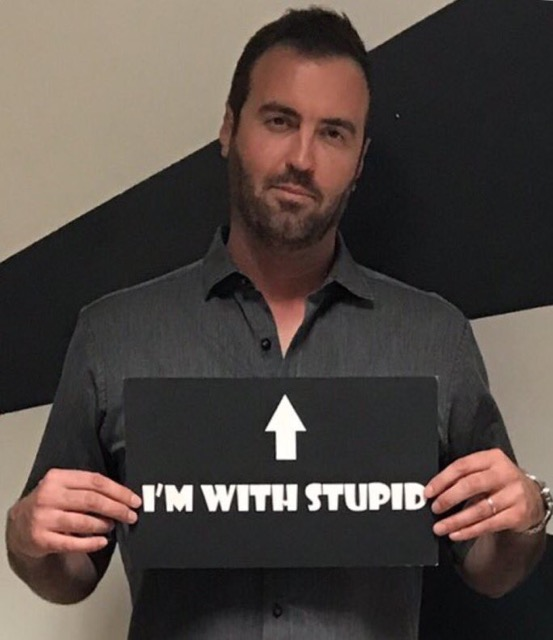
- Kelly in 2017
- Born: July 20, 1981 (age 45); Steubenville, Ohio, USA
- Occupations: Radio personality; broadcaster; writer
- Employer(s): Premiere Networks iHeartMedia; KPRC
- Political party: Republican
- Spouse: Aubrey Yarbrough (m. 2011)
- Children: 2
- Website: jessekellyshow.com

Jesse Kelly is an American conservative radio host, political commentator, and former political candidate. An avowed anti-communist, he hosts the nationally syndicated talk radio program The Jesse Kelly Show. Kelly is known for his blunt commentary on politics, culture, and veteran issues from a right-wing perspective.

== Early life and education ==
Kelly was born July 20, 1981, in Steubenville, Ohio, in the state's Rust Belt region. He graduated from Bozeman High School and attended Montana State University, leaving to enlist in the U.S. Marine Corps in 2000.

== Military career ==
Kelly served as an infantry Marine, being deployed to Iraq in 2003 during Operation Iraqi Freedom as part of the Second Persian Gulf War.

Kelly received an honorable discharge in 2004 after four years of service. Following his military service, he worked as a project manager in his family's construction business in Arizona.

== Political career ==
Kelly, a member of the Republican Party, ran for Congress in Arizona twice. In 2010, he campaigned for Arizona's 8th congressional district with no prior political experience, winning the Republican primary but losing the general election to incumbent Democrat Gabrielle Giffords 47.3–48.8%.

In 2012, following Giffords' resignation, Kelly ran in the special election for the same district, winning the Republican primary but losing the general election to Democrat Ron Barber, 45.4–52.3%.

Kelly additionally entered the regular 2012 election for Arizona's 2nd congressional district but withdrew before the Republican primary on August 28.

== Media career ==
Kelly began his radio career in 2018, hosting a one-hour show on KPRC 950 AM in Houston, Texas, which later expanded to two hours. The Jesse Kelly Show debuted in national syndication in April 2020 through Key Networks and was picked up by Premiere Networks in 2021. The Premiere Networks contract was renewed for a three-year period in April 2024. Noted for keeping American up on "hot topics and issues. From news and politics, to business and social issues," Premiere stated, "the U.S. Marine combat veteran shares his unique and entertaining perspective, unfiltered opinions and trademark humor as he discusses the latest headlines and welcomes a variety of guests and experts." The renewal continued their broadcast of the show to "more than 200 stations in top markets nationwide".

As of 2021, he also hosted the digital TV show I'm Right with Jesse Kelly on The First TV.

Kelly is active on social media, with over 350,000 followers on Twitter (now X) as of 2024, where he shares political commentary. He has appeared as a commentator on major networks and received nominations and awards in the radio industry. He reported live on the 2024 Republican National Convention in Milwaukee, along with his friends and fellow radio hosts Clay Travis and Buck Sexton.

Kelly is a long-time friend of conservative pundits Tucker Carlson and Megyn Kelly, and has promoted them on his television show, and been a frequent guest on both Carlson's and Kelly's podcasts, including after the attempted assassination of Donald Trump in Pennsylvania. He later joined them on their respective live tours in 2024 and 2025.

== Books ==
- Kelly, Jesse (June 6, 2023). The Anti-Communist Manifesto. New York, New York: Threshold Editions. ISBN 978-1-6680-1088-4.
  - A USA Today review adds, "Featuring practical tools and tactics to not only identify communists but also defend the United States from this malicious enemy, The Anti-Communist Manifesto is an instructive guide for all patriots."
