= Peter Lewis (cyclist) =

Australian cyclist

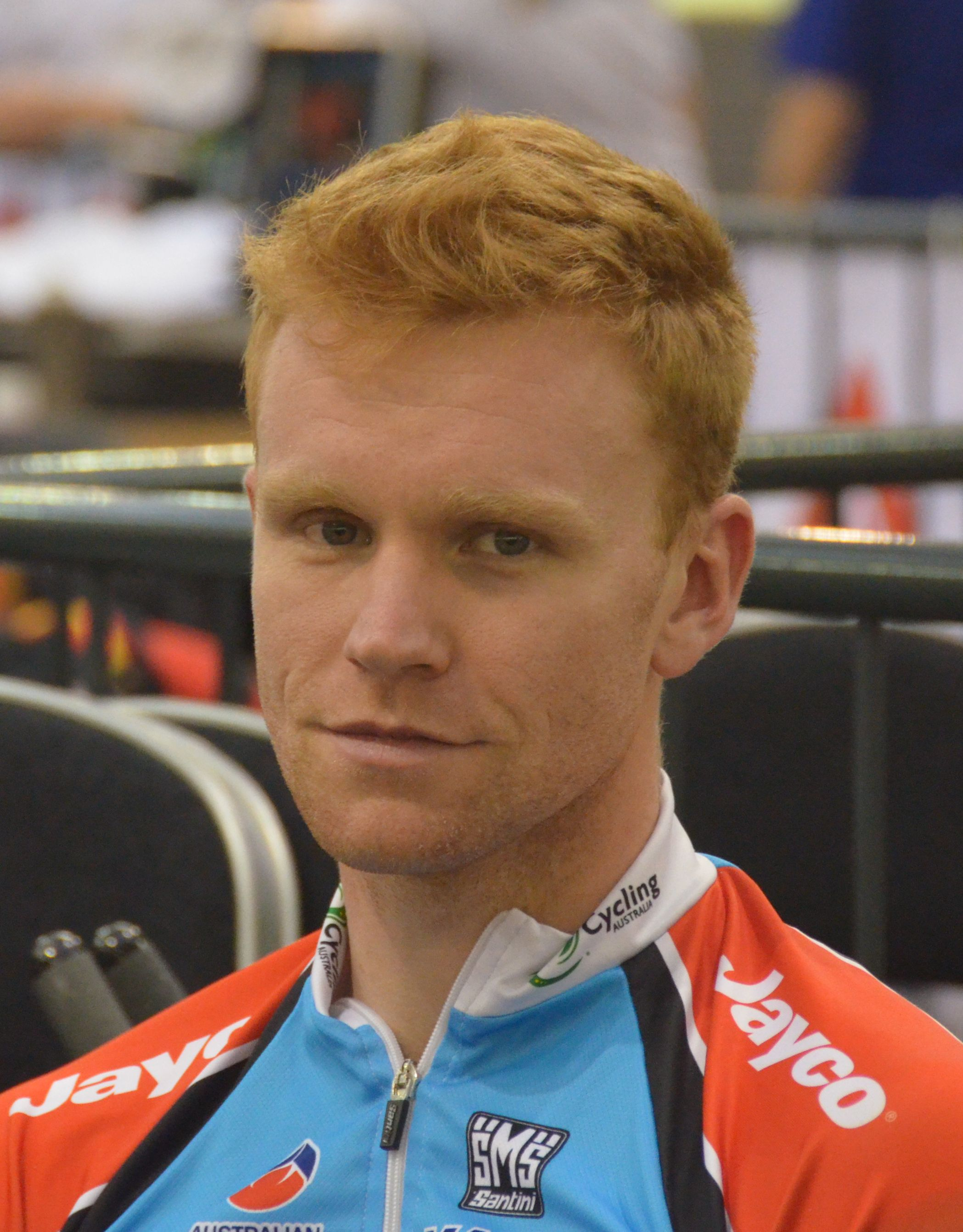

Personal information
- Born: 1 February 1990 (age 36) Newcastle, New South Wales, Australia

Cycling career
- Sport: Cycling
- Role: Rider

Peter Lewis (born 1 February 1990) is an Australian professional racing cyclist. He rode at the 2015 UCI Track Cycling World Championships.
