= Samantha Lucie-Smith =

New Zealand swimmer

Personal information
- Born: July 26, 1992 (age 33)

Sport
- Sport: Swimming

Samantha Lucie-Smith (born 26 July 1992) is a New Zealand swimmer. She competed in the 4 × 200 metre freestyle relay event at the 2012 Summer Olympics.
