= Bernard Esterhuizen =

South African track cyclist

Bernard Esterhuizen (born 4 October 1992) is a South African track cyclist. At the 2012 Summer Olympics, he competed in the Men's sprint.

He was a precocious cyclist, and began racing on the track from the age of eight, inspired by his father’s world master’s championship titles.

Beginning in 2009, Esterhuizen was based at the UCI World Cycling Centre in Aigle, Switzerland. He specialized in sprints, being noted for his “explosive racing” in shorter distances. He was chosen to compete in the 2010 at the youth Olympic Festival held in Australia. That year he raced at the Commonwealth Games in the Keirin but crashed. He won in the 1 kilometre (0.62 mi) time trial at the 2010 UCI Juniors Track World Championships. He qualified for the London Olympics by an 18th place ranking in sprints for 2011 and 2012.

He has been a star with Team South Africa.
