= Lani Cabrera =

Barbadian swimmer (born 1993)

Personal information
- Full name: Lani Rose Cabrera
- Nationality: Barbadian
- Born: 22 April 1993 (age 33)

Sport
- Sport: Swimming

Lani Rose Cabrera (born 22 April 1993) is a Barbadian swimmer. She competed in the women's 400 metre freestyle event at the 2016 Summer Olympics where she ranked 30th with a time of 4:28.95. She did not advance to the semifinals.
