= England at the 2014 Commonwealth Games =

- CG code: ENG
- CGA: Commonwealth Games England
- Website: weareengland.org

in Glasgow, Scotland
- Competitors: 416 in 18 sports
- Flag bearers: Opening: Nick Matthew; Closing: Kate Richardson-Walsh
- Medals Ranked 1st: Gold 58 Silver 59 Bronze 57 Total 174

Commonwealth Games appearances (overview)
- 1930; 1934; 1938; 1950; 1954; 1958; 1962; 1966; 1970; 1974; 1978; 1982; 1986; 1990; 1994; 1998; 2002; 2006; 2010; 2014; 2018; 2022; 2026; 2030

England competed at the 2014 Commonwealth Games in Glasgow, Scotland, between 23 July and 3 August 2014. Commonwealth Games England named a team of 416 athletes consisting of 216 men and 200 women across the 18 disciplines.

England topped the medal table with 58 gold medals, 59 silver medals and 57 bronze medals.

== Medal table (top three) ==
Rank	Nation	Gold	Silver	Bronze	Total
1	England	58	59	57	174
2	Australia	49	42	46	137
3	Canada	32	16	34	82
Totals (3 entries)		139	117	137	393

== Administration ==
On 11 September 2013, Commonwealth Games England announced the appointment of Chef-de-Mission Jan Paterson and her support team.

- Jan Paterson – Chef-de-Mission
- Graeme Dell – Deputy Chef-de-Mission for operations
- Hilda Gibson – Deputy Chef-de-Mission for planning
- Don Parker – Deputy Chef-de-Mission for sport
- Claire Furlong – Head of media
- Mo Diprose – Head of commercial operations

On 20 November 2013, Commonwealth Games England announced the appointment of Team Leaders for the 18 sports.

- Alexei Evangulov – Aquatics–Diving
- Dawn Peart – Aquatics–Swimming
- Peter Stanley – Athletics
- Jens Grill – Badminton
- John Hallam – Boxing
- Keith Reynolds – Cycling
- Mike Weinstock – Gymnastics
- Danny Kerry – Hockey
- Karen Roberts – Judo
- John Bell – Lawn bowls
- Sarah Gandon – Netball
- Nadine Cooke – Rugby 7s
- Martyn White – Shooting
- Louise Pickford – Squash
- John Pett – Table tennis
- James Taylor – Triathlon
- Maggie Lynes – Weightlifting
- Shaun Morley – Wrestling

== Medallists ==
Medal	Name	Sport	Event	Date
Gold	Jodie Stimpson	Triathlon	Women's triathlon	24 July
Gold	Sophie Thornhill; Helen Scott (pilot)	Cycling	Women's tandem sprint B	24 July
Gold	Alistair Brownlee MBE	Triathlon	Men's triathlon	24 July
Gold	Ashley McKenzie	Judo	Men's 60 kg	24 July
Gold	Colin Oates	Judo	Men's 66 kg	24 July
Gold	Nekoda Smythe-Davis	Judo	Women's 57 kg	24 July
Gold	Joanna Rowsell MBE	Cycling	Women's individual pursuit	24 July
Gold	Danny Williams	Judo	Men's 73 kg	25 July
Gold	Ben Proud	Swimming	Men's 50 metre butterfly	25 July
Gold	Megan Fletcher	Judo	Women's 70 kg	25 July
Gold	Owen Livesey	Judo	Men's 81 kg	25 July
Gold	Chris Walker-Hebborn	Swimming	Men's 100 metre backstroke	25 July
Gold	Vicky Holland; Jonathan Brownlee; Jodie Stimpson; Alistair Brownlee MBE	Triathlon	Mixed relay	26 July
Gold	Zoe Smith	Weightlifting	Women's 58 kg	26 July
Gold	David Luckman; Parag Patel FRCS	Shooting	Queen's prize pairs	26 July
Gold	Fran Halsall	Swimming	Women's 50 metre freestyle	26 July
Gold	Adam Peaty	Swimming	Men's 100 metre breaststroke	26 July
Gold	Charlotte Kerwood	Shooting	Women's double trap	27 July
Gold	Steve Scott	Shooting	Men's double trap	27 July
Gold	Sophie Thornhill; Helen Scott (pilot)	Cycling	Women's tandem 1km time trial B	27 July
Gold	Laura Trott OBE	Cycling	Women's points race	27 July
Gold	Siobhan-Marie O'Connor	Swimming	Women's 200 metre individual medley	27 July
Gold	Fran Halsall	Swimming	Women's 50 metre butterfly	27 July
Gold	Dan Greaves	Athletics	Men's discus throw (F42/44)	28 July
Gold	Nick Matthew	Squash	Men's singles	28 July
Gold	Oliver Hynd MBE	Swimming	Men's 200 metre individual medley SM8	28 July
Gold	Sophie Taylor	Swimming	Women's 100 metre breaststroke	28 July
Gold	Louis Smith MBE; Kristian Thomas; Max Whitlock; Nile Wilson; Sam Oldham	Gymnastics	Men's artistic team all-around	29 July
Gold	David Luckman	Shooting	Queen's prize individual	29 July
Gold	Daniel Rivers	Shooting	Men's 50 metre rifle three positions	29 July
Gold	Ruby Harrold; Kelly Simm; Hannah Whelan; Claudia Fragapane; Becky Downie	Gymnastics	Women's artistic team all-around	29 July
Gold	Ben Proud	Swimming	Men's 50 metre freestyle	29 July
Gold	Chris Walker-Hebborn; Adam Peaty; Adam Barrett; Adam Brown	Swimming	Men's 4 × 100 metre medley relay	29 July
Gold	Max Whitlock	Gymnastics	Men's artistic individual all-around	30 July
Gold	Jack Laugher	Diving	Men's 1 metre springboard	30 July
Gold	Alicia Blagg; Rebecca Gallantree	Diving	Women's synchronised 3 metre springboard	30 July
Gold	Greg Rutherford MBE	Athletics	Men's long jump	30 July
Gold	Claudia Fragapane	Gymnastics	Women's artistic individual all-around	30 July
Gold	Alex Dowsett	Cycling	Men's road time trial	31 July
Gold	Max Whitlock	Gymnastics	Men's floor	31 July
Gold	Claudia Fragapane	Gymnastics	Women's vault	31 July
Gold	Rebecca Downie	Gymnastics	Women's uneven bars	31 July
Gold	Sophie Tolchard; Ellen Falkner; Sian Honnor	Lawn bowls	Women's triples	31 July
Gold	David Weir CBE	Athletics	Men's 1500 metres (T54)	31 July
Gold	Jack Laugher; Chris Mears	Diving	Men's synchronised 3 metre springboard	1 August
Gold	Claudia Fragapane	Gymnastics	Women's floor	1 August
Gold	Steve Lewis	Athletics	Men's pole vault	1 August
Gold	Nile Wilson	Gymnastics	Men's horizontal bar	1 August
Gold	Paul Drinkhall; Joanna Drinkhall	Table tennis	Mixed doubles	2 August
Gold	Nicola Adams MBE	Boxing	Women's flyweight	2 August
Gold	Scott Fitzgerald	Boxing	Men's welterweight	2 August
Gold	Savannah Marshall	Boxing	Women's middleweight	2 August
Gold	Antony Fowler	Boxing	Men's middleweight	2 August
Gold	Conrad Williams; Michael Bingham; Daniel Awde; Matthew Hudson-Smith	Athletics	Men's 4 × 400 metres relay	2 August
Gold	Tom Daley	Diving	Men's 10 metre platform	2 August
Gold	Joe Joyce	Boxing	Men's super heavyweight	2 August
Gold	Lizzie Armitstead	Cycling	Women's road race	3 August
Gold	Chris Adcock; Gabby Adcock	Badminton	Mixed doubles	3 August
Silver	Jonathan Brownlee	Triathlon	Men's triathlon	24 July
Silver	Aimee Willmott	Swimming	Women's 400 metre individual medley	24 July
Silver	Sir Bradley Wiggins CBE; Ed Clancy MBE; Steven Burke MBE; Andy Tennant	Cycling	Men's team pursuit	24 July
Silver	Philip Hindes MBE; Jason Kenny OBE; Kian Emadi	Cycling	Men's team sprint	24 July
Silver	Kelly Edwards	Judo	Women's 52 kg	24 July
Silver	Siobhan-Marie O'Connor	Swimming	Women's 200 metre freestyle	24 July
Silver	Siobhan-Marie O'Connor; Francesca Halsall; Amy Smith; Rebecca Turner	Swimming	Women's 4 × 100 metre freestyle relay	24 July
Silver	Jason Kenny OBE	Cycling	Men's sprint	25 July
Silver	Tom Reed	Judo	Men's 81 kg	25 July
Silver	Steph Slater	Swimming	Women's 100 metre freestyle S8	25 July
Silver	Siobhan-Marie O'Connor	Swimming	Women's 100 metre butterfly	25 July
Silver	Gemma Gibbons	Judo	Women's 78 kg	26 July
Silver	Thomas Hamer	Swimming	Men's 200 metre freestyle S14	26 July
Silver	Jodie Myers	Judo	Women's +78 kg	26 July
Silver	Matthew French	Shooting	Men's double trap	27 July
Silver	Bethy Woodward	Athletics	Women's long jump (T37/38)	27 July
Silver	Natalie Melmore	Lawn bowls	Women's singles	27 July
Silver	Laura Massaro	Squash	Women's singles	28 July
Silver	Andrew Baggaley; Paul Drinkhall; Liam Pitchford; Daniel Reed; Sam Walker	Table Tennis	Men's team	28 July
Silver	James Willstrop	Squash	Men's singles	28 July
Silver	Chris Adcock; Gabby Adcock; Andrew Ellis; Chris Langridge; Peter Mills; Heather Olver; Rajiv Ouseph; Kate Robertshaw; Lauren Smith; Sarah Walker	Badminton	Mixed team	28 July
Silver	Aimee Willmott	Swimming	Women's 200 metre butterfly	28 July
Silver	Adam Peaty	Swimming	Men's 50 metre breaststroke	28 July
Silver	Adam Gemili	Athletics	Men's 100 metres	28 July
Silver	Aaron Heading	Shooting	Men's trap	29 July
Silver	Yana Rattigan	Wrestling	Women's freestyle 48 kg	29 July
Silver	Lauren Quigley	Swimming	Women's 50 metre backstroke	29 July
Silver	Laura Samuel	Athletics	Women's triple jump	29 July
Silver	William Sharman	Athletics	Men's 110 metres hurdles	29 July
Silver	Ashley Bryant	Athletics	Men's decathlon	29 July
Silver	Lauren Quigley; Sophie Taylor; Siobhan-Marie O'Connor; Francesca Halsall	Swimming	Women's 4 × 100 metre medley relay	29 July
Silver	Laura Weightman	Athletics	Women's 1500 metres	29 July
Silver	Nick Miller	Athletics	Men's hammer throw	29 July
Silver	Sarah Barrow; Tonia Couch	Diving	Women's 10 m synchronised platform	30 July
Silver	Ruby Harrold	Gymnastics	Women's artistic individual all-around	30 July
Silver	Emma Pooley	Cycling	Women's road time trial	31 July
Silver	Max Whitlock	Gymnastics	Men's pommel horse	31 July
Silver	Jodie Williams	Athletics	Women's 200 metres	31 July
Silver	Jack Laugher	Diving	Men's 3 metre springboard	31 July
Silver	Jazmin Sawyers	Athletics	Women's long jump	31 July
Silver	Jamie-Lea Winch; Natalie Melmore	Lawn bowls	Women's pairs	1 August
Silver	Kristian Thomas	Gymnastics	Men's vault	1 August
Silver	Kristian Thomas	Gymnastics	Men's horizontal bar	1 August
Silver	Nile Wilson	Gymnastics	Men's parallel bars	1 August
Silver	Stuart Airey; Jamie Chestney; Andrew Knapper; John McGuinness	Lawn bowls	Men's fours	1 August
Silver	Tom Daley; James Denny	Diving	Men's synchronised 10 metre platform	1 August
Silver	Isobel Pooley	Athletics	Women's high jump	1 August
Silver	Tiffany Porter	Athletics	Women's 100 metres hurdles	1 August
Silver	Luke Cutts	Athletics	Men's pole vault	1 August
Silver	Natalie Blake	Weightlifting	Women's 61 kg	2 August
Silver	Liam Pitchford; Tin-Tin Ho	Table tennis	Mixed doubles	2 August
Silver	Jenny Duncalf; Laura Massaro	Squash	Women's doubles	2 August
Silver	Qais Ashfaq	Boxing	Men's bantamweight	2 August
Silver	Adam Gemili; Harry Aikines-Aryeetey; Richard Kilty; Danny Talbot	Athletics	Men's 4 × 100 metres relay	2 August
Silver	England women's field hockey team: Giselle Ansley; Sophie Bray; Alex Danson; Susie Gilbert; Maddie Hinch (g); Lily Owsley; Sam Quek; Kate Richardson-Walsh (c); Zoe Shipperley; Susannah Townsend; Georgie Twigg; Laura Unsworth; Ellie Watton; Hollie Webb; Nicola White; Lucy Wood	Hockey	Women's tournament	2 August
Silver	Emma Pooley	Cycling	Women's road race	3 August
Silver	Chris Langridge; Heather Olver	Badminton	Mixed doubles	3 August
Silver	Peter Barker; Alison Waters	Squash	Mixed doubles	3 August
Silver	Adrian Grant; Nick Matthew	Squash	Men's doubles	3 August
Bronze	Jessica Varnish	Cycling	Women's 500 m time trial	24 July
Bronze	Vicky Holland	Triathlon	Women's triathlon	24 July
Bronze	Andrew Willis	Swimming	Men's 200 metre breaststroke	24 July
Bronze	James Guy	Swimming	Men's 400 metre freestyle	24 July
Bronze	Daniel Rivers	Shooting	Men's 10 m air rifle	25 July
Bronze	Katie Jemima Yeats-Brown	Judo	Women's 63 kg	25 July
Bronze	Faith Pitman	Judo	Women's 63 kg	25 July
Bronze	Liam Tancock	Swimming	Men's 100 metre backstroke	25 July
Bronze	Adam Brown; James Disney-May; Adam Barrett; Ben Proud	Swimming	Men's 4 × 100 metre freestyle relay	25 July
Bronze	Mick Gault OBE	Shooting	Men's 10 m air pistol	26 July
Bronze	Rory Warlow	Shooting	Men's skeet	26 July
Bronze	Gary Hall	Judo	Men's 90 kg	26 July
Bronze	Molly Renshaw	Swimming	Women's 200 metre breaststroke	26 July
Bronze	Siobhan-Marie O'Connor; Amelia Maughan; Ellie Faulkner; Rebecca Turner	Swimming	Women's 4 × 200 metre freestyle relay	26 July
Bronze	Rachel Parish	Shooting	Women's double trap	27 July
Bronze	Jessica Varnish	Cycling	Women's sprint	27 July
Bronze	Liam Tancock	Swimming	Men's 50 metre backstroke	27 July
Bronze	Peter Barker	Squash	Men's singles	28 July
Bronze	Kenneth Parr	Shooting	Men's 50 metre rifle prone	28 July
Bronze	Andrew Knapper; Sam Tolchard	Lawn bowls	Men's pairs	28 July
Bronze	Caroline Povey	Shooting	Women's trap	28 July
Bronze	Sophie Hitchon	Athletics	Women's hammer throw	28 July
Bronze	Adam Barrett	Swimming	Men's 100 metre butterfly	28 July
Bronze	Kristian Callaghan	Shooting	Men's 25 metre rapid fire pistol	29 July
Bronze	Parag Patel	Shooting	Queen's prize individual	29 July
Bronze	Mike Grundy	Wrestling	Men's freestyle 74 kg	29 July
Bronze	Chinu Xxx	Wrestling	Men's freestyle 125 kg	29 July
Bronze	Nile Wilson	Gymnastics	Men's artistic individual all-around	30 July
Bronze	Leon Rattigan	Wrestling	Men's freestyle 97 kg	30 July
Bronze	Jessica Taylor	Athletics	Women's heptathlon	30 July
Bronze	Ben Watson	Weightlifting	Men's 105 kg	30 July
Bronze	Hannah Whelan	Gymnastics	Women's artistic individual all-around	30 July
Bronze	Louisa Porogovska	Wrestling	Women's freestyle 55 kg	31 July
Bronze	Louis Smith MBE	Gymnastics	Men's pommel horse	31 July
Bronze	Jade Jones	Athletics	Women's 1500m – T54	31 July
Bronze	Bianca Williams	Athletics	Women's 200 metres	31 July
Bronze	Oliver Dingley	Diving	Men's 3 metre springboard	31 July
Bronze	Ruby Harrold	Gymnastics	Women's uneven bars	31 July
Bronze	Bob Love; David Fisher; Paul Brown	Lawn bowls	Open para-sport triples	31 July
Bronze	Nick Robinson-Baker; Freddie Woodward	Diving	Men's synchronised 3 metre springboard	1 August
Bronze	Max Whitlock	Gymnastics	Men's parallel bars	1 August
Bronze	Samuel Maxwell	Boxing	Men's light welterweight	1 August
Bronze	Jade Lally	Athletics	Women's discus throw	1 August
Bronze	Daniel Reed; Kelly Sibley	Table tennis	Mixed doubles	2 August
Bronze	Emma Beddoes; Alison Waters	Squash	Women's doubles	2 August
Bronze	Ali Jawad	Weightlifting	Men's 72 kg	2 August
Bronze	Hannah Starling	Diving	Women's 3 metre springboard	2 August
Bronze	Liam Pitchford	Table tennis	Men's singles	2 August
Bronze	Jo Pavey	Athletics	Women's 5000 metres	2 August
Bronze	Sally Scott	Athletics	Women's pole vault	2 August
Bronze	Christine Ohuruogu MBE; Shana Cox; Kelly Massey; Anyika Onuora	Athletics	Women's 4 × 400 metres relay	2 August
Bronze	Asha Philip; Bianca Williams; Jodie Williams; Ashleigh Nelson	Athletics	Women's 4 × 100 metres relay	2 August
Bronze	Chris Langridge; Peter Mills	Badminton	Men's doubles	2 August
Bronze	Gabby Adcock; Lauren Smith	Badminton	Women's doubles	2 August
Bronze	England men's field hockey team: Alastair Brogdon; Nicholas Catlin; David Condon; Adam Dixon; Daniel Fox; Mark Gleghorne; Michael Hoare; Ashley Jackson; Iain Lewers; Simon Mantell; Harry Martin; Barry Middleton (c); George Pinner (g); Phil Roper; Henry Weir; Ollie Willars	Hockey	Men's tournament	3 August
Bronze	Daryl Selby; James Willstrop	Squash	Men's doubles	3 August
Bronze	Scott Thwaites	Cycling	Men's road race	3 August

Medals by sport
Sport	1st place, gold medalist(s)	2nd place, silver medalist(s)	3rd place, bronze medalist(s)	Total
Athletics	5	13	9	27
Badminton	1	2	2	5
Boxing	5	1	1	7
Cycling	6	5	3	14
Diving	4	3	3	10
Gymnastics	9	5	5	19
Hockey	0	1	1	2
Judo	6	4	3	13
Lawn bowls	1	3	2	6
Netball	0	0	0	0
Rugby sevens	0	0	0	0
Shooting	5	2	8	15
Squash	1	5	3	9
Swimming	10	10	8	28
Table tennis	1	2	2	5
Triathlon	3	1	1	5
Weightlifting	1	1	2	4
Wrestling	0	1	4	5
Total	58	59	57	174

Medals by day
Day	1st place, gold medalist(s)	2nd place, silver medalist(s)	3rd place, bronze medalist(s)	Total
24 July	7	7	4	18
25 July	5	4	5	14
26 July	5	3	5	13
27 July	6	3	3	12
28 July	4	7	6	17
29 July	6	9	4	19
30 July	5	2	5	12
31 July	6	5	7	18
1 August	4	9	4	17
2 August	8	6	11	25
3 August	2	4	3	9
Total	58	59	57	174

== Athletics ==
On 14 May 2014, Commonwealth Games England announced that Steve Way and Amy Whitehead had been selected to compete in the men's and women's marathons respectively. On 16 June, Commonwealth Games England announced a track and field team of 129 athletes including the previously selected marathon runners. On 8 July, Commonwealth Games England announced that heptathlete Morgan Lake had withdrawn from the team to concentrate on the World Junior Athletics Championships. Grace Clements has been selected to replace her. Following medical advice heptathlete Katarina Johnson-Thompson withdrew from the team due to injury on 21 July. On the eve of the opening ceremony, sprinter Dwain Chambers announced his withdrawal from the 4 × 100 metres relay squad, to concentrate on running the individual 100 metres at the 2014 European Athletics Championships in Zurich eight days later. On the same day, Jessica Tappin was announced as Johnson-Thompson's replacement in the heptathlon. Meghan Beesley (400m hurdles) and Chris Thompson (10000m) withdrew due to injury. Laura Wake was named as a replacement for Beesley. Having been selected to compete in the 5000m and 10000m at the European Athletics Championships, Jo Pavey withdrew from the 10000m, although she still competed in the 5000m. Kate Avery was selected to replace her in the 10000m. On the first day of the Games it was announced that Mo Farah CBE had withdrawn from the team due to illness.

Key

- Note – Ranks given for track events are within the athlete's heat only
- Q = Qualified for the next round
- q = Qualified for the next round as a fastest loser or, in field events, by position without achieving the qualifying target
- NR = National record
- N/A = Round not applicable for the event
- Bye = Athlete not required to compete in round

Men

Track & road events

Athlete	Event	Heat		Semifinal		Final	
Athlete	Event	Result	Rank	Result	Rank	Result	Rank
Harry Aikines-Aryeetey	100 m	10.33	3 q	10.25	4	did not advance	
Adam Gemili	100 m	10.15	1 Q	10.07	1 Q	10.10	2nd place, silver medalist(s)
Richard Kilty	100 m	10.34	=2 Q	10.27	6	did not advance	
Daniel Hooker	100 m (T37)	13.09	4 q	—N/a		13.15	7
Chris Clarke	200 m	20.71	2 Q	20.71	6	did not advance	
James Ellington	200 m	20.73	2 Q	20.66	4	did not advance	
Danny Talbot	200 m	20.56	1 Q	20.47	2 Q	20.45	7
Michael Bingham	400 m	45.80	2 Q	45.71	4	did not advance	
Nigel Levine	400 m	46.35	4 q	46.57	5	did not advance	
Martyn Rooney	400 m	45.57	1 Q	45.22	1 Q	45.15	4
Mukhtar Mohammed	800 m	1:49.13	4 q	1:51.91	7	did not advance	
Andrew Osagie	800 m	DQ		did not advance			
Michael Rimmer	800 m	1:47.64	2 Q	1:47.70	5 q	1:46.71	7
Lee Emanuel	1500 m	3:46.29	11	—N/a		did not advance	
Charlie Grice	1500 m	3:40.09	2 Q	—N/a		3:41.58	7
Richard Peters	1500 m	3:44.10	9	—N/a		did not advance	
Will Smith	1500 m (T54)	3:24.80	3 Q	—N/a		3:25.04	5
David Weir CBE	1500 m (T54)	3:28.24	1 Q	—N/a		3:21.67	1st place, gold medalist(s)
Tom Farrell	5000 m	—N/a				13:23.96	7
Andy Vernon	5000 m	—N/a				13:22.32	6
Jonny Mellor	10000 m	—N/a				DNF	
Lawrence Clarke	110 m hurdles	13.63	2 Q	—N/a		13.84	8
Will Sharman	110 m hurdles	13.49	2 Q	—N/a		13.36	2nd place, silver medalist(s)
Andy Turner	110 m hurdles	DQ		—N/a		did not advance	
Niall Flannery	400 m hurdles	49.97	4 q	—N/a		49.46	4
Sebastian Rodger	400 m hurdles	50.71	4	—N/a		did not advance	
Richard Yates	400 m hurdles	49.80	2 Q	—N/a		50.13	7
Luke Gunn	3000 m steeplechase	—N/a				8:45.99	7
James Wilkinson	3000 m steeplechase	—N/a				8:24.98	5
James Ellington; Harry Aikines-Aryeetey; Richard Kilty; Andy Robertson (Heat); Adam Gemili; Harry Aikines-Aryeetey; Richard Kilty; Danny Talbot (Final)	4 × 100 m relay	38.78	1 Q	—N/a		38.02	2nd place, silver medalist(s)
Daniel Awde; Matthew Hudson-Smith; Nigel Levine; Conrad Williams (Heat); Conrad Williams; Michael Bingham; Daniel Awde; Matthew Hudson-Smith (Final)	4 × 400 m relay	3:03.01	1 Q	—N/a		3:00.46	1st place, gold medalist(s)
Ben Moreau	Marathon	—N/a				2:16:50	14
Nicholas Torry	Marathon	—N/a				2:16:34	13
Steve Way	Marathon	—N/a				2:15:16	10

Field Events

Athlete	Event	Qualification		Final	
Athlete	Event	Distance	Rank	Distance	Rank
JJ Jegede	Long jump	7.66	11 q	7.81	7
Greg Rutherford MBE	Long jump	8.05	1 Q	8.20	1st place, gold medalist(s)
Chris Tomlinson	Long jump	7.89	6 q	7.99	5
Nathan Douglas	Triple jump	16.05	9 q	14.56	11
Nathan Fox	Triple jump	16.17	6 q	16.26	6
Phillips Idowu MBE	Triple jump	16.70	2 Q	16.45	5
Chris Baker	High jump	2.20	=1 q	2.25	4
Martyn Bernard	High jump	2.20	=9 q	2.21	=5
Tom Parsons	High jump	2.20	=9 q	2.16	13
Luke Cutts	Pole vault	—N/a		5.55	2nd place, silver medalist(s)
Max Eaves	Pole vault	—N/a		NM	—
Steve Lewis	Pole vault	—N/a		5.55	1st place, gold medalist(s)
Scott Rider	Shot put	18.40	10 q	18.12	10
Carl Myerscough	Discus throw	59.95	7 q	59.88	7
Tom Norman	Discus throw	55.31	14	did not advance	
Dan Greaves	Discus throw (F42/44)	—N/a		59.21	1st place, gold medalist(s)
Joe Dunderdale	Javelin throw	69.22	15	did not advance	
Benji Pearson	Javelin throw	66.77	18	did not advance	
Nick Miller	Hammer throw	72.76	1 Q	72.99	2nd place, silver medalist(s)
Alex Smith	Hammer throw	72.34	2 Q	70.99	4
Amir Williamson	Hammer throw	68.42	6 q	69.38	6

Combined events – Decathlon

Athlete	Event	100 m	LJ	SP	HJ	400 m	110H	DT	PV	JT	1500 m	Final	Rank
Martin Brockman	Result	11.54	6.93	13.84	2.05	50.83	15.65	37.85	4.50	42.15	5:11.42	7010	13
Martin Brockman	Points	744	1541	2260	3110	3887	4660	5281	6041	6514	7010	7010	13
Ashley Bryant	Result	11.10	7.56	14.07	1.99	49.07	14.92	43.45	4.70	66.24	4:38.24	8109	2nd place, silver medalist(s)
Ashley Bryant	Points	838	1788	2521	3315	4173	5032	5767	6586	7418	8109	8109	2nd place, silver medalist(s)
John Lane	Result	10.71	7.50	14.12	1.99	48.13	14.64	38.96	4.90	52.25	4:54.95	7922	4
John Lane	Points	926	1861	2597	3391	4294	5188	5831	6711	7333	7922	7922	4

Women

Track & road events

Athlete	Event	Heat		Semifinal		Final	
Athlete	Event	Result	Rank	Result	Rank	Result	Rank
Sophie Papps	100 m	11.53	3 Q	11.61	7	did not advance	
Asha Philip	100 m	11.47	2 Q	11.21	2 Q	11.18	4
Bianca Williams	100 m	11.37	2 Q	11.34	3 q	11.31	6
Selina Litt & Ryan Henry-Asquith (Guide)	100 m (T12)	14.28	2	—N/a		did not advance	
Anyika Onuora	200 m	23.19	2 Q	23.02	2 Q	22.64	4
Bianca Williams	200 m	22.97	1 Q	23.17	1 Q	22.58	3rd place, bronze medalist(s)
Jodie Williams	200 m	23.42	1 Q	22.64	2 Q	22.50	2nd place, silver medalist(s)
Margaret Adeoye	400 m	53.98	2 Q	52.48	3	did not advance	
Shana Cox	400 m	53.00	3 Q	52.57	5	did not advance	
Kelly Massey	400 m	52.34	3 Q	52.19	2 Q	53.08	8
Jessica Judd	800 m	2.02.16	2 Q	2:02.26	1 Q	2:01.91	4
Jenny Meadows	800 m	2.02.53	1 Q	2:02.29	5 q	2:02.43	7
Marilyn Okoro	800 m	2:03.90	5 q	2:06.75	8	did not advance	
Hannah England	1500 m	4:05.62	4 Q	—N/a		4:11.10	7
Jemma Simpson	1500 m	4:09.27	5 q	—N/a		4:12.93	9
Laura Weightman	1500 m	4:08.58	3 Q	—N/a		4:09.24	2nd place, silver medalist(s)
Jade Jones	1500 m (T54)	3:53.37	3 Q	—N/a		4:00.19	3rd place, bronze medalist(s)
Lauren Rowles	1500 m (T54)	4:08.99	5 q	—N/a		4:11.34	9
Shelly Woods	1500 m (T54)	4:00.82	1 Q	—N/a		4:06.26	6
Helen Clitheroe	5000 m	—N/a				15:55.00	11
Emelia Gorecka	5000 m	—N/a				15:40.03	8
Jo Pavey	5000 m	—N/a				15:08.96	3rd place, bronze medalist(s)
Kate Avery	10000 m	—N/a				32:33.35	4
Sonia Samuels	10000 m	—N/a				32:57.96	7
Tiffany Porter	100 m hurdles	12.84	1 Q	—N/a		12.80	2nd place, silver medalist(s)
Serita Solomon	100 m hurdles	13.38	3	—N/a		did not advance	
Hayley McLean	400 m hurdles	DQ		—N/a		did not advance	
Ese Okoro	400 m hurdles	57.99	5	—N/a		did not advance	
Laura Wake	400 m hurdles	58.29	5	—N/a		did not advance	
Racheal Bamford	3000 m steeplechase	—N/a				9:45.51	7
Pippa Woolven	3000 m steeplechase	—N/a				9:47.97	8
Asha Philip; Anyika Onuora; Louise Bloor; Ashleigh Nelson (Heat); Asha Philip; Bianca Williams; Jodie Williams; Ashleigh Nelson (Final)	4 × 100 m relay	43.33	2 Q	—N/a		43.10	3rd place, bronze medalist(s)
Emily Diamond; Shana Cox; Margaret Adeoye; Christine Ohuruogu MBE (Heat); Christine Ohuruogu MBE; Shana Cox; Kelly Massey; Anyika Onuora (Final)	4 × 400 m relay	3:27.88	1 Q	—N/a		3:27.24	3rd place, bronze medalist(s)
Louise Damen	Marathon	—N/a				2:32:59	7
Alyson Dixon	Marathon	—N/a				DNF	
Amy Whitehead	Marathon	—N/a				2:35:06	9

Field events

Athlete	Event	Qualification		Final	
Athlete	Event	Distance	Position	Distance	Position
Shara Proctor	Long jump	6.51	4 q	NM	—
Jazmin Sawyers	Long jump	6.39	6 q	6.54	2nd place, silver medalist(s)
Lorraine Ugen	Long jump	6.30	11 q	6.39	5
Fiona Clarke	Long jump (F37/38)	—N/a		3.79	8
Bethany Woodward	Long jump (F37/38)	—N/a		4.00	2nd place, silver medalist(s)
Yamile Aldama	Triple jump	13.29	7 q	DNS	
Chioma Matthews	Triple jump	13.14	10 q	13.46	8
Laura Samuel	Triple jump	13.54	3 Q	14.09	2nd place, silver medalist(s)
Bethan Partridge	High jump	1.81	=14	did not advance	
Isobel Pooley	High jump	1.85	=1 q	1.94	2nd place, silver medalist(s)
Katie Byres	Pole vault	—N/a		NM	—
Sally Scott	Pole vault	—N/a		3.80	= (bronze)
Eden Francis	Shot put	—N/a		16.57	6
Sophie McKinna	Shot put	—N/a		16.59	5
Rachel Wallader	Shot put	—N/a		16.83	4
Eden Francis	Discus throw	55.05	7 q	55.80	7
Jade Lally	Discus throw	57.13	5 Q	60.48	3rd place, bronze medalist(s)
Izzy Jeffs	Javelin throw	—N/a		53.77	9
Freya Jones	Javelin throw	—N/a		51.36	10
Goldie Sayers	Javelin throw	—N/a		57.68	7
Shaunagh Brown	Hammer throw	59.37	9 q	58.67	11
Sophie Hitchon	Hammer throw	65.31	3 Q	68.72	3rd place, bronze medalist(s)
Sarah Holt	Hammer throw	61.05	8 q	65.67	4

Combined events – Heptathlon

Athlete	Event	100H	HJ	SP	200 m	LJ	JT	800 m	Final	Rank
Grace Clements	Result	14.54	1.75	12.66	27.04	5.80	41.97	2:22.80	5512	7
Grace Clements	Points	903	1819	2524	3232	4021	4726	5512	5512	7
Jessica Tappin	Result	13.51	1.69	11.92	24.74	5.46	36.91	2:11.65	5695	6
Jessica Tappin	Points	1049	1891	2547	3458	4146	4754	5695	5695	6
Jessica Taylor	Result	13.81	1.75	11.95	24.42	6.16	33.89	2:17.59	5826	3rd place, bronze medalist(s)
Jessica Taylor	Points	1005	1921	2579	3520	4419	4969	5826	5826	3rd place, bronze medalist(s)

== Badminton ==
On 5 June Commonwealth Games England named a squad of 10 to compete in Glasgow.

Individual

Athlete	Event	Round of 64	Round of 32	Round of 16	Quarterfinals	Semifinals	Final	Rank
Athlete	Event	Opposition Score	Opposition Score	Opposition Score	Opposition Score	Opposition Score	Opposition Score	Rank
Rajiv Ouseph	Men's singles	C Mulenga (ZAM); W 2–0	S Edoo (MRI); W 2–0	Huang C (SIN); W 2–0	K Merrilees (SCO); W 2–0	K Parupalli (IND); L 1–2	Bronze final R. M. V. Gurusaidutt (IND); L 1–2	4
Sarah Walker	Women's singles	Bye	S Watson (BAR); W 2–0	E Cann (JER); W 2–1	M Li (CAN); L 0–2	did not advance		

Doubles

Athletes	Event	Round of 64	Round of 32	Round of 16	Quarterfinals	Semifinals	Final	Rank
Athletes	Event	Opposition Score	Opposition Score	Opposition Score	Opposition Score	Opposition Score	Opposition Score	Rank
Chris Adcock & Andrew Ellis	Men's doubles	Bye	D Clark & R Stewart (FAI); W 2–0	T Murphy & T Stephenson (NIR); W 2–0	D Font & O Gwilt (WAL); W 2–1	Tan W K & Goh V S (MAS); L 0–2	Bronze final C Langridge & P Mills (ENG); L 0–2	4
Chris Langridge & Peter Mills	Men's doubles	Bye	A Malan & W Viljoen (RSA); W 2–0	Liew D & Chan P S (MAS); W 2–0	R Tam & G Warfe (AUS); W 2–0	D B Chrisnanta & C Triyachart (SIN); L 1–2	Bronze final C Adcock & A Ellis (ENG); W 2–0	3rd place, bronze medalist(s)
Gabby Adcock & Lauren Smith	Women's doubles	—N/a	I Bankier & K Gilmour (SCO); W 2–1	Fu M & V Neo (SIN); W 2–0	A Bruce & P Chan (CAN); W 0–2	V Hoo & Woon K W (MAS); L 0–2	Bronze final Lim Y L & L P Jing (MAS); W 2–1	3rd place, bronze medalist(s)
Heather Olver & Kate Robertshaw	Women's doubles	—N/a	D Nakalyango & M Nankabirwa (UGA); W 2–0	Lim Y L & L P Jing (MAS); L 0–2	did not advance			
Chris Adcock & Gabby Adcock	Mixed doubles	Bye	T Murphy & A Stephenson (NIR); W 2–0	Tan W K & V Hoo (MAS); W 2–0	C Triyachart & Yao L (SIN); W 2–0	R Blair & I Bankier (SCO); W 2–0	C Langridge & H Olver (ENG); W 2–0	1st place, gold medalist(s)
Chris Langridge & Heather Olver	Mixed doubles	Bye	P K Mbogo & M Joseph (KEN); W 2–0	J Tho & J Guan (AUS); W 2–0	T Ng & A Bruce (CAN); W 2–0	P S Chang & L P Jing (MAS); W 2–1	C Adcock & G Adcock (ENG); L 0–2	2nd place, silver medalist(s)

Mixed team

Pool F

Pos	Team	Pld	W	L	GF	GA	GD	PF	PA	PD	Pts	Qualification
1	England	3	3	0	30	1	+29	638	305	+333	3	Quarterfinals
2	Jersey	3	2	1	20	12	+8	558	518	+40	2	
3	Northern Ireland	3	1	2	11	23	−12	528	629	−101	1	
4	Mauritius	3	0	3	4	29	−25	412	684	−272	0	

Source: glasgow2014.com

England
5
Commonwealth Arena, Glasgow
24 July

Northern Ireland
0

			1	2	3
1	(England) (Northern Ireland)	Chris Adcock / Gabby Adcock; Ciaran Chambers / Sinead Chambers	21; 8	21; 17
2	(England) (Northern Ireland)	Rajiv Ouseph; Tony Stephenson	21; 5	21; 9
3	(England) (Northern Ireland)	Sarah Walker; Alannah Stephenson	21; 9	8; 21	21; 13
4	(England) (Northern Ireland)	Peter Mills / Chris Langridge; Tony Stephenson / Tony Murphy	21; 11	21; 9
5	(England) (Northern Ireland)	Kate Robertshaw / Heather Olver; Sinead Chambers / Caroline Black	21; 7	21; 10

England
5
Commonwealth Arena, Glasgow
25 July

Jersey
0

			1	2	3
1	(England) (Jersey)	Chris Langridge / Heather Olver; Mark Constable / Mariana Agathangelou	21; 7	21; 13
2	(England) (Jersey)	Rajiv Ouseph; Alexander Hutchings	21; 8	21; 8
3	(England) (Jersey)	Sarah Walker; Elizabeth Cann	21; 15	21; 13
4	(England) (Jersey)	Chris Adcock / Andrew Ellis; Mark Constable / Alexander Hutchings	21; 7	21; 12
5	(England) (Jersey)	Lauren Smith / Gabby Adcock; Solen Pasturel / Mariana Agathangelou	21; 8	21; 10

England
5
Commonwealth Arena, Glasgow
26 July

Mauritius
0

			1	2	3
1	(England) (Mauritius)	Rajiv Ouseph; Julien Paul	21; 10	21; 8
2	(England) (Mauritius)	Sarah Walker; Kate Foo Kune	21; 8	21; 9
3	(England) (Mauritius)	Chris Langridge / Peter Mills; Sahir Edoo / Aatish Lubah	21; 14	21; 9
4	(England) (Mauritius)	Kate Robertshaw / Heather Olver; Nicki Chan-Lam / Yeldy Louison	21; 5	21; 6
5	(England) (Mauritius)	Chris Langridge / Heather Olver; Aatish Lubah / Kate Foo Kune	21; 7	21; 9

Quarterfinal

Sri Lanka
0
Commonwealth Arena, Glasgow
26 July

England
3

			1	2	3
1	(Sri Lanka) (England)	Dinuka Karunaratna / Thilini Hendahewa; Chris Adcock / Gabby Adcock	13; 21	10; 21
2	(Sri Lanka) (England)	Niluka Karunaratne; Rajiv Ouseph	15; 21	16; 21
3	(Sri Lanka) (England)	Thilini Hendahewa; Sarah Walker	14; 21	14; 21

Semifinal

India
0
Commonwealth Arena, Glasgow
27 July

England
3

			1	2	3
1	(India) (England)	Akshay Dewalkar / Jwala Gutta; Chris Adcock / Gabby Adcock	16; 21	21; 16	11; 21
2	(India) (England)	Kashyap Parupalli; Rajiv Ouseph	16; 21	19; 21
3	(India) (England)	Akshay Dewalkar / Pranav Chopra; Chris Adcock / Andrew Ellis	21; 12	13; 21	16; 21

Final

Malaysia
3
Commonwealth Arena, Glasgow
28 July

England
1

			1	2	3
1	(Malaysia) (England)	Chan Peng Soon / Lai Pei Jing; Chris Adcock / Gabby Adcock	14; 21	26; 28
2	(Malaysia) (England)	Chong Wei Feng; Rajiv Ouseph	21; 17	19; 21	21; 19
3	(Malaysia) (England)	Goh V Shem / Tan Wee Kiong; Chris Adcock / Andrew Ellis	21; 19	21; 17
4	(Malaysia) (England)	Tee Jing Yi; Sarah Walker	21; 16	21; 17

== Boxing ==
Commonwealth Games England named a squad of 11 boxers on 18 June.

Men

Athlete	Event	Round of 32	Round of 16	Quarterfinals	Semifinals	Final	
Athlete	Event	Opposition Result	Opposition Result	Opposition Result	Opposition Result	Opposition Result	Rank
Charlie Edwards	Flyweight	Bye	R McFadden (SCO); L 0–3	did not advance			
Qais Ashfaq	Bantamweight	Bye	N Thamahane (LES); W 3–0	J Ham (SCO); W 3–0	B G Njangiru (KEN); W 3–0	M Conlan (NIR); L 0–3	2nd place, silver medalist(s)
Pat McCormack	Lightweight	J Cordina (WAL); L 1–2	did not advance				
Samuel Maxwell	Light welterweight	I Falekaono (TON); W TKO	D Okoth (KEN); W 3–0	M Kumar (IND); W 3–0	J Taylor (SCO); L 0–3	Did not advance	3rd place, bronze medalist(s)
Scott Fitzgerald	Welterweight	R Bastien (LCA); W KO	A Mohammed (GHA); W 3–0	B Morgan (NZL); W 2–1	T Mbenge (RSA); W 3–0	M Jangra (IND); W 3–0	1st place, gold medalist(s)
Antony Fowler	Middleweight	K Spanos (CYP); W 3–0	K Smith (SCO); W 3–0	N O Abaka (KEN); W 3–0	B Muziyo (ZAM); W 3–0	V Vijender (IND); W 3–0	1st place, gold medalist(s)
Warren Baister	Heavyweight	—N/a	S Ward (NIR); W 2–1	S El-Mais (CAN); L 1–2	did not advance		
Joe Joyce	Super heavyweight	—N/a	K Agnes (SEY); W 3–0	R Henderson (SCO); W TKO	M Sekabembe (UGA); W DSQ	J Goodall (AUS); W 3–0	1st place, gold medalist(s)

Sekabembe was disqualified after failing his medical test. Joyce was thus sent through to the final automatically.

Women

Athlete	Event	Round of 16	Quarterfinals	Semifinals	Final	
Athlete	Event	Opposition Result	Opposition Result	Opposition Result	Opposition Result	Rank
Nicola Adams	Flyweight	O Oladeji (NGR); W 3–0	E de Silva (SRI); W 3–0	M Bujold (CAN); W 3–0	M Walsh (NIR); W 2–1	1st place, gold medalist(s)
Natasha Jonas	Lightweight	S Watts (AUS); L 0–0	did not advance			
Savannah Marshall	Middleweight	P Rani (IND); W 3–0	P Morake (BOT); W 3–0	E Ogoke (NGR); W 3–0	A Fortin (CAN); W 0–0	1st place, gold medalist(s)

== Cycling ==
A squad of 31 cyclists was announced by Commonwealth Games England on 11 June. On 27 June British Cycling in collaboration with Team England confirmed that Sir Bradley Wiggins would compete on the track as well as in the road events. On 18 July, Commonwealth Games England announced that Jon Dibben had withdrawn from both the road and track teams due to injury. While he was not replaced in the track team a substitute could be named to the road squad. Russell Downing was named as the replacement for Dibben, while Sir Bradley Wiggins revealed that he would only compete in the track events at the Games. David Fletcher withdrew due to injury and was replaced by Liam Killeen in the men's mountain biking.

=== Road ===
Athlete	Event	Time	Rank
Russell Downing	Men's road race	4:17:34	4
Alex Dowsett	Men's road race	DNF	
Tom Moses	Men's road race	DNF	
Paul Oldham	Men's road race	DNF	
Ian Stannard	Men's road race	DNF	
Scott Thwaites	Men's road race	4:14:26	3rd place, bronze medalist(s)
Lizzie Armitstead	Women's road race	2:38:43	1st place, gold medalist(s)
Hannah Barnes	Women's road race	2:44:12	12
Lucy Garner	Women's road race	2:44:12	19
Dani King MBE	Women's road race	2:44:12	11
Emma Pooley	Women's road race	2:39:08	2nd place, silver medalist(s)
Laura Trott OBE	Women's road race	2:44:12	20
Steve Cummings	Men's time trial	49:14.86	7
Alex Dowsett	Men's time trial	47:41.78	1st place, gold medalist(s)
Emma Pooley	Women's time trial	42:31.49	2nd place, silver medalist(s)
Joanna Rowsell MBE	Women's time trial	44:45.87	13

=== Track ===
Sprint

Athlete	Event	Qualification		Round 1	Repechage	Quarterfinals	Semifinals	Final	
Athlete	Event	Time speed (km/h)	Rank	Opposition time speed (km/h)	Opposition time speed (km/h)	Opposition time	Opposition time	Opposition time	Rank
Matt Crampton	Men's sprint	10.213; 70.498	12 Q	M Glaetzer (AUS); L	N Phillip (TRI); P Hindes (ENG); W 10.733; 67.082	E Dawkins (NZL); L, L	Did not advance	5th – 8th classification M Glaetzer (AUS); M Archibald (NZL); A Awang (MAS); L	8
Philip Hindes MBE	Men's sprint	10.108; 71.230	6 Q	A Awang (MAS); L	M Crampton (ENG); N Phillip (TRI); L	did not advance			
Jason Kenny OBE	Men's sprint	10.206; 70.546	11 Q	E Dawkins (NZL); L	C Skinner (SCO); L Oliva (WAL); W 10.735; 67.070	M Glaetzer (AUS); W 10.909, W 10.405	P Lewis (AUS); L, W 10.318, W 10.258	S Webster (NZL); L, W 10.466, L	2nd place, silver medalist(s)
Dannielle Khan	Women's sprint	11.661	8 Q	—N/a		S Morton (AUS); L, L	Did not advance	5th–8th classification V Williamson (ENG); S McKenzie (NZL); J Davis (SCO); L	7
Jess Varnish	Women's sprint	11.279	3 Q	—N/a		V Williamson (ENG); W 11.942, W 12.099	A Meares (AUS); L, L	Bronze final F Mustapa (MAS); W 11.944, W 11.856	3rd place, bronze medalist(s)
Victoria Williamson	Women's sprint	11.529	6 Q	—N/a		J Varnish (ENG); L, L	Did not advance	5th–8th classification S McKenzie (NZL); D Khan (ENG); J Davis (SCO); W 12.356	5
Sophie Thornhill; Helen Scott (Pilot)	Women's tandem sprint B	11.277 GR; 63.846	1 Q	—N/a			F Johnson & H Takos (Pilot) (AUS); W 12.390, W 12.318	A McGlynn & L Haston (Pilot) (SCO); W 12.021, W 12.319	1st place, gold medalist(s)
Kian Emadi; Philip Hindes MBE; Jason Kenny OBE	Men's team sprint	43.730	2 Q	—N/a				New Zealand; L 43.706	2nd place, silver medalist(s)

Pursuit

Athlete	Event	Qualification		Final	
Athlete	Event	Time	Rank	Opponent Results	Rank
Steven Burke MBE	Men's pursuit	4:31.752	10	did not advance	
Andy Tennant	Men's pursuit	4:23.723	5	did not advance	
Dani King MBE	Women's pursuit	3:38.084	8	did not advance	
Joanna Rowsell MBE	Women's pursuit	3:29.038 GR	1 Q	A Edmondson (AUS); W 3:31.615	1st place, gold medalist(s)
Laura Trott OBE	Women's pursuit	3:35.213	6	did not advance	
Steven Burke MBE; Ed Clancy MBE; Andy Tennant; Sir Bradley Wiggins CBE	Men's team pursuit	3:59.249	2 Q	Australia; L 4:00.136	2nd place, silver medalist(s)

Time trial

Athlete	Event	Time	Rank
Steven Burke MBE	Men's time trial	1:03.449	9
Ed Clancy MBE	Men's time trial	1:01.439	4
Kian Emadi	Men's time trial	1:01.641	5
Dannielle Khan	Women's time trial	35.420	6
Jess Varnish	Women's time trial	34.267	3rd place, bronze medalist(s)
Victoria Williamson	Women's time trial	35.465	7
Sophie Thornhill; Helen Scott (Pilot)	Women's tandem time trial B	1:08.187 GR	1st place, gold medalist(s)

Points race

Athlete	Event	Qualification		Final	
Athlete	Event	Points	Rank	Points	Rank
Andy Tennant	Men's point race	5	7 Q	DNF	
Dani King MBE	Women's points race	—N/a		25	7
Joanna Rowsell MBE	Women's points race	—N/a		0	17
Laura Trott OBE	Women's points race	—N/a		37	1st place, gold medalist(s)

Scratch race

Athlete	Event	Qualification	Final
Athlete	Event	Rank	Rank
Steven Burke MBE	Men's scratch race	DNS	Did not advance
Ed Clancy MBE	Men's scratch race	10 Q	11
Andy Tennant	Men's scratch race	1 Q	DNF
Dani King MBE	Women's scratch race	—N/a	4
Joanna Rowsell MBE	Women's scratch race	—N/a	19
Laura Trott OBE	Women's scratch race	—N/a	11

Keirin

Athlete	Event	Round 1	Repechage	Semifinals	Final
Athlete	Event	Rank	Rank	Rank	Rank
Matt Crampton	Men's keirin	3 R	1 Q	4	10
Kian Emadi	Men's keirin	5 R	3	did not advance	
Jason Kenny OBE	Men's keirin	5 R	2	did not advance	

=== Mountain bike ===
Athlete	Event	Time	Rank
Liam Killeen	Men's cross country	1:41:57	6
Paul Oldham	Men's cross country	1:43:29	9
Alice Barnes	Women's cross country	1:43:27	5
Beth Crumpton	Women's cross country	1:46:04	9
Annie Last	Women's cross country	1:42:34	4

== Diving ==
On 13 June Commonwealth Games England announced a squad of 15 divers. In addition it was revealed that permission had been sought from the Commonwealth Games Federation to include 13-year-old Victoria Vincent – the British 10m platform diving champion – in the squad as she failed to meet the minimum age criteria of 14 for most international diving events. On 19 June it was confirmed that permission had been granted for her to compete and as a consequence she was the youngest member of England's team in Glasgow. On 18 July, Commonwealth Games England announced that Daniel Goodfellow and Matty Lee had both withdrawn from the diving squad due to injury and would not be replaced.

Men

Athlete	Event	Preliminaries		Final	
Athlete	Event	Points	Rank	Points	Rank
Chris Mears	1 m springboard	383.40	3 Q	396.20	4
Freddie Woodward	1 m springboard	365.45	4 Q	340.05	10
Jack Laugher	1 m springboard	435.50	1 Q	449.90	1st place, gold medalist(s)
Jack Laugher	3 m springboard	465.30	1 Q	449.70	2nd place, silver medalist(s)
James Denny	3 m springboard	394.05	6 Q	410.90	6
Oliver Dingley	3 m springboard	387.05	8 Q	425.20	3rd place, bronze medalist(s)
Tom Daley	10 m platform	488.85	1 Q	516.55	1st place, gold medalist(s)
James Denny	10 m platform	408.40	6 Q	397.65	6
Matthew Dixon	10 m platform	365.65	10 Q	366.15	9
Jack Laugher; Chris Mears	3 m synchronised springboard	—N/a		431.94	1st place, gold medalist(s)
Nick Robinson-Baker; Freddie Woodward	3 m synchronised springboard	—N/a		364.41	3rd place, bronze medalist(s)
Tom Daley; James Denny	10 m synchronised platform	—N/a		399.36	2nd place, silver medalist(s)

Women

Athlete	Event	Preliminaries		Final	
Athlete	Event	Points	Rank	Points	Rank
Alicia Blagg	1 m springboard	237.05	11 Q	257.50	10
Rebecca Gallantree	1 m springboard	260.35	6 Q	259.20	9
Hannah Starling	1 m springboard	252.40	8 Q	264.05	7
Alicia Blagg	3 m springboard	300.70	6 Q	300.95	7
Rebecca Gallantree	3 m springboard	266.25	11 Q	292.20	10
Hannah Starling	3 m springboard	311.05	4 Q	316.95	3rd place, bronze medalist(s)
Sarah Barrow	10 m platform	290.60	9 Q	315.80	9
Tonia Couch	10 m platform	337.00	3 Q	335.70	5
Victoria Vincent	10 m platform	297.30	8 Q	299.50	10
Alicia Blagg; Rebecca Gallantree	3 m synchronised springboard	—N/a		300.24	1st place, gold medalist(s)
Sarah Barrow; Tonia Couch	10 m synchronised platform	—N/a		307.92	2nd place, silver medalist(s)

== Gymnastics ==
On 17 June Commonwealth Games England named a squad of 10 artistic and 3 rhythmic gymnasts.

=== Artistic ===
Men
All-around

Athlete	Event	Qualification								Final							
Athlete	Event	F	PH	R	V	PB	HB	Total	Rank	F	PH	R	V	PB	HB	Total	Rank
Sam Oldham	Individual	15.325 Q	12.100	14.533 Q	14.500	—N/a				—N/a							
Louis Smith MBE	Individual	—N/a	15.700 Q	—N/a		14.133	—N/a			—N/a							
Kristian Thomas	Individual	14.466	—N/a	14.000	15.100 Q	—N/a	15.033 Q	—N/a		—N/a							
Max Whitlock	Individual	15.600 Q	15.733 Q	14.433 Q	15.333	14.500 Q	14.766	90.365	1 Q	15.466	15.866	14.733	14.500	14.966	15.100	90.631	1st place, gold medalist(s)
Nile Wilson	Individual	14.458	13.633	14.383	14.500	14.833 Q	14.800 Q	86.607	2 Q	14.600	13.833	14.633	14.700	15.433	14.766	87.695	3rd place, bronze medalist(s)
Sam Oldham; Louis Smith MBE; Kristian Thomas; Max Whitlock; Nile Wilson	Team	—N/a								45.391	45.066	43.349	44.933	43.466	44.599	266.804	1st place, gold medalist(s)

Individual events

Athlete	Apparatus	Score	Rank
Louis Smith MBE	Pommel horse	14.966	3rd place, bronze medalist(s)
Max Whitlock	Pommel horse	15.966	2nd place, silver medalist(s)
Kristian Thomas	Vault	14.499	2nd place, silver medalist(s)
Max Whitlock	Rings	14.566	5
Nile Wilson	Rings	14.466	7
Max Whitlock	Parallel bars	15.066	3rd place, bronze medalist(s)
Nile Wilson	Parallel bars	15.433	2nd place, silver medalist(s)
Kristian Thomas	Horizontal bar	14.966	2nd place, silver medalist(s)
Nile Wilson	Horizontal bar	14.966	1st place, gold medalist(s)
Max Whitlock	Floor	15.533	1st place, gold medalist(s)
Kristian Thomas	Floor	13.366	8

Sam Oldham originally qualified but pulled out due to injury. He was replaced by Nile Wilson who qualified in reserve.
Sam Oldham originally qualified but pulled out due to injury. He was replaced by Kristian Thomas who qualified in reserve.

Women
All-around

Athlete	Event	Qualification						Final					
Athlete	Event	F	V	UB	BB	Total	Rank	F	V	UB	BB	Total	Rank
Rebecca Downie	Individual	—N/a		14.683 Q	13.200 Q	—N/a		—N/a					
Claudia Fragapane	Individual	14.733 Q	14.641 Q	13.333	14.033 Q	56.740	1 Q	14.733	14.733	13.700	12.966	56.132	1st place, gold medalist(s)
Ruby Harrold	Individual	13.466	14.733	13.400 Q	12.466	54.065	3 Q	13.700	14.800	14.566	12.166	55.232	2nd place, silver medalist(s)
Kelly Simm	Individual	12.466	14.600 Q	—N/a				—N/a					
Hannah Whelan	Individual	13.700 Q	14.300	12.333	13.033	53.366	5 Q	13.500	14.066	13.100	14.033	54.699	3rd place, bronze medalist(s)
Rebecca Downie; Claudia Fragapane; Ruby Harrold; Kelly Simm; Hannah Whelan	Team	—N/a						41.899	43.974	41.416	40.266	167.555	1st place, gold medalist(s)

Individual events

Athlete	Apparatus	Score	Rank
Rebecca Downie	Balance beam	9.833	8
Claudia Fragapane	Balance beam	13.133	5
Kelly Simm	Vault	14.199	5
Claudia Fragapane	Vault	14.633	1st place, gold medalist(s)
Rebecca Downie	Uneven bars	14.666	1st place, gold medalist(s)
Ruby Harrold	Uneven bars	14.366	3rd place, bronze medalist(s)
Hannah Whelan	Floor	13.133	6
Claudia Fragapane	Floor	14.541	1st place, gold medalist(s)

=== Rhythmic ===
All-around

Athlete	Event	Qualification						Final					
Athlete	Event	Hoop	Ball	Clubs	Ribbon	Total	Rank	Hoop	Ball	Clubs	Ribbon	Total	Rank
Mimi-Isabella Cesar	Individual	12.850	13.225	11.300	12.450	49.825	14	did not advance					
Lynne Hutchison	Individual	10.950	12.900	13.350	13.900 Q	51.100	12 Q	12.900	11.950	13.275	12.900	51.025	12
Stephani Sherlock	Individual	14.150 Q	13.525 Q	12.550	13.200	53.425	11 Q	13.550	13.025	12.050	12.550	51.175	11
Mimi-Isabella Cesar; Lynne Hutchison; Stephani Sherlock	Team	—N/a						37.950	39.650	37.200	39.550	132.100	4

Individual finals

Athlete	Event	Total	Rank
Lynne Hutchison	Ribbon	13.550	5
Stephani Sherlock	Ball	12.950	7
Stephani Sherlock	Hoop	13.875	7

== Hockey ==
Two squads totalling 32 players were named by England Hockey on 27 June. On 18 July, Commonwealth Games England announced that Tim Whiteman had withdrawn from the men's team due to injury with Ollie Willars named as his replacement.

=== Men's tournament ===
The men's squad consists of:

- Alastair Brogdon
- Nicholas Catlin
- David Condon
- Adam Dixon
- Daniel Fox
- Mark Gleghorne
- Michael Hoare
- Ashley Jackson
- Iain Lewers
- Simon Mantell
- Harry Martin
- Barry Middleton (Captain)
- George Pinner (GK)
- Phil Roper
- Henry Weir
- Ollie Willars

Pool B

Team	Pld	W	D	L	GF	GA	GD	Pts	Qualification
New Zealand	4	4	0	0	19	3	+16	12	Semi-finals
England	4	3	0	1	18	5	+13	9	Semi-finals
Canada	4	1	0	3	5	9	−4	3	
Malaysia	4	1	0	3	6	18	−12	3	
Trinidad and Tobago	4	1	0	3	6	19	−13	3	

Source: FIH

24 July 2014
19:00

England	6–1	Trinidad and Tobago
Jackson 7'; Lewers 25'; Gleghorne 27'; Catlin 51'; Roper 59'; Middleton 64'	Report	Pierre 29'

Umpires:
Gareth Greenfield (NZL)
Gavin Caldecott (CAN)

27 July 2014
21:00

Malaysia	1–8	England
Saabah 26'	Report	Jackson 5', 44', 56', 61'; Dixon 50'; Gleghorne 64'; Roper 68'; Brogdon 69'

Umpires:
Raghu Prasad (IND)
Martin Madden (SCO)

29 July 2014
09:00

New Zealand	2–1	England
Hayward 51'; S. Child 68'	Report	Dixon 59'

Umpires:
Adam Kearns (AUS)
Peter Wright (RSA)

31 July 2014
09:00

England	3–1	Canada
Jackson 25', 54'; Middleton 36'	Report	Tupper 68'

Umpires:
Martin Madden (SCO)
Eric Koh (MAS)

Semifinal

2 August 2014
10:00

Australia	4–1	England
White 3'; Orchard 12'; Ciriello 62'; Ockenden 69'	Report	Martin 52'

Umpires:
Martin Madden (SCO)
Peter Wright (RSA)

Bronze final

3 August 2014
10:00

(bronze) England	3–3	New Zealand
Brogdon 29'; Jackson 30', 38'	Report	S. Child 12', 59'; Hayward 33'
Penalties
Jackson (penalty shoot-out scored); Catlin (penalty shoot-out scored); Middleton (penalty shoot-out scored); Jackson (penalty shoot-out scored)	4–2	(penalty shoot-out scored) Inglis; (penalty shoot-out missed) Hilton; (penalty shoot-out scored) Edwards; (penalty shoot-out missed) S. Child

Umpires:
Adam Kearns (AUS)
Peter Wright (RSA)

=== Women's tournament ===
The women's squad consists of:

- Giselle Ansley
- Sophie Bray
- Alex Danson
- Susie Gilbert
- Maddie Hinch (GK)
- Lily Owsley
- Sam Quek
- Kate Richardson-Walsh (Captain)
- Zoe Shipperley
- Susannah Townsend
- Georgie Twigg
- Laura Unsworth
- Ellie Watton
- Hollie Webb
- Nicola White
- Lucy Wood

Pool B

Team	Pld	W	D	L	GF	GA	GD	Pts	Qualification
Australia	4	4	0	0	25	0	+25	12	Semi-finals
England	4	3	0	1	9	4	+5	9	Semi-finals
Scotland	4	2	0	2	5	11	−6	6	
Malaysia	4	0	1	3	0	11	−11	1	
Wales	4	0	1	3	0	13	−13	1	

24 July 2014
11:00

England	2–0	Wales
Danson 29'; White 63'	Report

Umpires:
Aleesha Unka (NZL)
Ayana McClean (TRI)

27 July 2014
11:00

England	5–0	Malaysia
Watton 17'; Ansley 35+'; Bray 42'; Danson 50'; Webb 70'	Report

Umpires:
Annelize Rostron (RSA)
Wendy Stewart (CAN)

28 July 2014
14:00

Australia	3–0	England
Kenny 12', 50'; Smith 13'	Report

Umpires:
Aleesha Unka (NZL)
Sarah Wilson (SCO)

30 July 2014
09:00

Scotland	1–2	England
Kidd 32'	Report	Danson 16'; Townsend 28'

Umpires:
Wendy Stewart (CAN)
Miskarmalia Ariffin (SIN)

Semifinal

1 August 2014
14:30

New Zealand	1–1	England
Glynn 68'	Report	Owsley 28'
Penalties
Whitelock (penalty shoot-out scored); Punt (penalty shoot-out missed); Glynn (penalty shoot-out missed); Michelsen (penalty shoot-out missed)	1–3	Twigg (penalty shoot-out scored); Danson (penalty shoot-out scored); Gilbert (penalty shoot-out scored); Bray (penalty shoot-out missed)

Umpires:
Annelize Rostron (RSA)
Kylie Seymour (AUS)

Final

2 August 2014
20:15

(gold) Australia	1–1	England (silver)
Kenny 70'	Report	Owsley 48'
Penalties
Eastham (penalty shoot-out scored); White (penalty shoot-out missed); Parker (penalty shoot-out scored); Kenny (penalty shoot-out missed); Blyth (penalty shoot-out scored)	3–1	(penalty shoot-out scored) Twigg; (penalty shoot-out missed) Danson; (penalty shoot-out missed) Gilbert; (penalty shoot-out missed) White

Umpires:
Dino Willox (WAL)
Wendy Stewart (CAN)

== Judo ==
Commonwealth Games England confirmed that a squad of 14 judoka has been selected on 13 May. On 18 July, Commonwealth Games England announced that Ben Fletcher (100 kg) had withdrawn from the team due to injury and that a replacement would be nominated. The following day, Commonwealth Games England announced that Danny Williams (73 kg) had been selected to replace him. Caroline Kinane (78 kg) has withdrawn due to injury and been replaced by Katie Jemima Yeats-Brown (63 kg).

Men

Athlete	Event	Round of 32	Round of 16	Quarterfinals	Semifinals	Repechage	Bronze medal	Final	
Athlete	Event	Opposition Result	Opposition Result	Opposition Result	Opposition Result	Opposition Result	Opposition Result	Opposition Result	Rank
Ashley McKenzie	−60 kg	—N/a	Bye	J Buchanan (SCO); W 0011–0002	N Sigauque (MOZ); W 1000–0001	—N/a		N Chana (IND); W 0101–0103	1st place, gold medalist(s)
Colin Oates	−66 kg	Bye	M Fikri (MAS); W 1000–0001	M Nandal (IND); W 1001–0000	J Millar (SCO); W 1001–0002	—N/a		A Krassas (CYP); W 1010–0002	1st place, gold medalist(s)
Jan Gosiewski	−73 kg	C Thompson (NIR); W 1001–0002	P Dawson (SCO); L 0003–0002	did not advance					
Danny Williams	−73 kg	C Ireland (WAL); W 002–000	A Dickens (AUS); W 0100–0012	E Fleming (NIR); W 1001–0002	J Bensted (AUS); W 0000–0001	—N/a		A Leat (NZL); W 0010–0000	1st place, gold medalist(s)
Owen Livesey	−81 kg	Bye	J Kirimi (KEN); W 1001–0002	B Munyonga (ZAM); W 101–000	J Burt (CAN); W 100–000	—N/a		T Reed (ENG); W 0000–0000	1st place, gold medalist(s)
Tom Reed	−81 kg	Bye	EJ Omgba Fouda (CMR); W 101–000	R Nicola (CYP); W 100–000	L Krieber-Gagnon (CAN); W 100–000	—N/a		O Livesey (ENG); L 0000–0000	2nd place, silver medalist(s)
Gary Hall	−90 kg	—N/a	L Sang (KEN); W 100–000	M Anthony (AUS); L 000–011	Did not advance	S Ombiongno (CMR); W 100–001	R Dill-Russell (NZL); W 1002–0001	Did not advance	3rd place, bronze medalist(s)

Women

Athlete	Event	Round of 16	Quarterfinals	Semifinals	Repechage	Bronze medal	Final	
Athlete	Event	Opposition Result	Opposition Result	Opposition Result	Opposition Result	Opposition Result	Opposition Result	Rank
Kelly Edwards	−52 kg	J Lewis (WAL); W 100–000	C Legentil (MRI); W 0000–0001	L Kearney (NIR); W 0000–0001	—N/a		L Renicks (SCO); L 000–100	2nd place, silver medalist(s)
Nekoda Smythe-Davis	−57 kg	Bye	K Powell (WAL); W 1000–0001	J Klimkait (CAN); W 0001–0002	—N/a		S Inglis (SCO); W 1011–0001	1st place, gold medalist(s)
Faith Pitman	−63 kg	Bye	B Valois Fortier (CAN); L 0001–0013	Did not advance	M Bezzina (MLT); W 100–000	K Haecker (AUS); W 0100–0001	Did not advance	3rd place, bronze medalist(s)
Katie Jemima Yeats-Brown	−63 kg	S Szogedi (GHA); W 0102–0001	K Haecker (AUS); L 0000–1011	Did not advance	G Choudhary (IND); W 1000–0002	B Valois Fortier (CAN); W 1000–0001	Did not advance	3rd place, bronze medalist(s)
Megan Fletcher	−70 kg	Bye	A Renaud-Roy (CAN); W 0001–0002	S Conway (SCO); W 0020–0010	—N/a		M de Villiers (NZL); W 0100–0000	1st place, gold medalist(s)
Gemma Gibbons	−78 kg	—N/a	B Rose (SEY); W 0101–0000	H M Atangana (CMR); W 0100–0000	—N/a		N Powell (WAL); L 0002–0102	2nd place, silver medalist(s)
Jodie Myers	+78 kg	—N/a	R Kaur (IND); W 0100–0000	A Laprovidence (MRI); W 0100–0000	—N/a		S Adlington (SCO); L 0000–0013	2nd place, silver medalist(s)

== Lawn bowls ==
On 30 May Commonwealth Games England announced the selection of a squad of 15 bowlers and 2 directors to assist the visually impaired competitors in the B2/B3 Mixed Pair. On the same day Bowls England confirmed that "the two directors are classed as athletes for the first time and will be eligible to receive any medals won."

Men

Athlete	Event	Group Stage						Quarterfinal	Semifinal	Final	
Athlete	Event	Opposition Score	Opposition Score	Opposition Score	Opposition Score	Opposition Score	Rank	Opposition Score	Opposition Score	Opposition Score	Rank
Sam Tolchard	Singles	R Weale (WAL); W 21–12	D Tagelagi (NIU); W 21–9	A Sherriff (AUS); L 18–21	N W Njuguna (KEN); W 21–20	—N/a	2 Q	S McIlroy (NZL); L 9–12	did not advance		
Andrew Knapper; Sam Tolchard	Pairs	India; W 19–12	Fiji; W 20–17	Wales; W 21–10	—N/a		1 Q	Northern Ireland; W 15–14	Scotland; L 15–16	Bronze final Namibia; W 19–12	3rd place, bronze medalist(s)
Stuart Airey; Jamie Chestney; John McGuinness	Triples	Falkland Islands; W 31–8	Malaysia; W 15–13	Pakistan; W 24–9	Australia; L 15–17	Papua New Guinea; W 22–13	2 Q	Wales; L 15–16	did not advance		
Stuart Airey; Jamie Chestney; Andrew Knapper; John McGuinness	Fours	Cook Islands; W 22–11	Jersey; W 14–12	Zambia; W 19–9	Northern Ireland; D 12–12	—N/a	1 Q	Northern Ireland; W 18–11	India; W 14–12	Scotland; L 8–16	2nd place, silver medalist(s)

Women

Athlete	Event	Group Stage						Quarterfinal	Semifinal	Final	
Athlete	Event	Opposition Score	Opposition Score	Opposition Score	Opposition Score	Opposition Score	Rank	Opposition Score	Opposition Score	Opposition Score	Rank
Natalie Melmore	Singles	C Spiteri (MLT); W 21–7	A Adam (SAM); W 21–20	M N Ndungu (KEN); W 21–14	L Greechan (JER); W 21–10	C McMillen (NIR); L 12–21	2 Q	C Brown (SCO); W 21–20	C Piketh (RSA); W 21–18	J Edwards (NZL); L 15–21	2nd place, silver medalist(s)
Natalie Melmore; Jamie-Lea Winch	Pairs	Cook Islands; W 15–13	Canada; W 14–13	Wales; D 15–15	—N/a		2 Q	Norfolk Island; W 17–12	Northern Ireland; W 19–14	South Africa; L 17–20	2nd place, silver medalist(s)
Ellen Falkner; Sian Honnor; Sophie Tolchard	Triples	Northern Ireland; W 18–12	Papua New Guinea; L 14–20	Scotland; W 21–9	—N/a		2 Q	Malaysia; W 24–6	Wales; W 18–13	Australia; W 22–4	1st place, gold medalist(s)
Ellen Falkner; Sian Honnor; Sophie Tolchard; Jamie-Lea Winch	Fours	Canada; W 21–11	Norfolk Island; W 22–7	South Africa; W 15–14	—N/a		1 Q	South Africa; L 10–12	did not advance		

Para-bowls

Athlete	Event	Group Stage				Semifinal	Final	
Athlete	Event	Opposition Score	Opposition Score	Opposition Score	Rank	Opposition Score	Opposition Score	Rank
Steve Simmons; Guide: Jeffrey Smith; Doreen Flanders; Guide: Moira Sheehan	Pairs	Australia; W 17–13	Scotland; L 7–10	Wales; L 7–12	3	did not advance		
Paul Brown; David Fisher; Bob Love	Triples	Wales; W 14–10	Malaysia; W 19–9	Scotland; L 14–22	2 Q	South Africa; L 9–15	Bronze final Scotland; W 16–12	3rd place, bronze medalist(s)

== Netball ==
On 1 July, England Netball named a squad of 12 to compete in Glasgow. In the absence of current captain Pamela Cookey due to injury Jade Clarke led the team.

The squad consists of Ama Agbeze, Sara Bayman, Eboni Beckford-Chambers, Jade Clarke (Captain), Kadeen Corbin, Sasha Corbin, Rachel Dunn, Stacey Francis, Serena Guthrie, Joanne Harten, Helen Housby and Geva Mentor.

Pool B

Team	Pld	W	L	PF	PA	PD	Pts	Qualification
Australia	5	5	0	322	185	+137	10	Semi-finals
England	5	4	1	293	160	+133	8	Semi-finals
South Africa	5	3	2	249	222	+27	6	
Wales	5	2	3	199	255	−56	4	
Trinidad and Tobago	5	1	4	167	282	−115	2	
Barbados	5	0	5	162	288	−126	0	

Source: glasgow2014.com

25 July 2014
11:30

Report
England
65 – 25
Wales

SECC Precinct
Umpires:
Marie-Louw Van Der Merve (RSA)
Joshua Bowring (AUS)
Reserve umpire:
Michelle Phippard (AUS)
Corbin 7/10 (70%)
Dunn 20/22 (91%)
Harten 33/43 (77%)
Housby 5/9 (56%)

James 11/16 (69%)
Lewis 5/10 (50%)
Moseley 9/15 (60%)
Thomas 0/4 (0%)

26 July 2014
09:30

Report
Australia
49 – 48
England

SECC Precinct
Umpires:
Yvonne Morgan (NZL)
Jonathan Bredin (NZL)
Reserve umpire:
Marie-Louw Van Der Merve (RSA)
Bassett 36/52 (69%)
Caldwell 2/5 (40%)
Medhurst 11/13 (85%)

Corbin 19/24 (79%)
Harten 29/37 (78%)

27 July 2014
17:00

Report
England
41 – 35
South Africa

SECC Precinct
Umpires:
Rachael Ayre (AUS)
Terrence Peart (JAM)
Reserve umpire:
Yvonne Morgan (NZL)
Corbin 5/10 (50%)
Dunn 16/18 (89%)
Harten 20/29 (69%)

Bootha 27/32 (84%)
Holtzhausen 8/15 (53%)
Myburgh 2/3 (67%)

29 July 2014
09:30

Report
England
70 – 24
Trinidad and Tobago

SECC Precinct
Umpires:
Marie-Louw Van Der Merve (RSA)
Clare McCabe (AUS)
Reserve umpire:
Yvonne Morgan (NZL)
Corbin 16/19 (84%)
Dunn 8/10 (80%)
Harten 35/43 (81%)
Housby 11/12 (92%)

Cooper 13/16 (81%)
McCollin 4/6 (67%)
Wilson 7/11 (64%)

30 July 2014
19:00

Report
Barbados
27 – 69
England

SECC Precinct
Umpires:
Yvonne Morgan (NZL)
Terrence Peart (JAM)
Reserve umpire:
Theresa Prince (RSA)
Browne 4/6 (67%)
Piggott 17/23 (74%)
Thomas 1/6 (17%)
Wharton 5/6 (83%)

Dunn 25/30 (83%)
Harten 33/36 (92%)
Housby 11/12 (92%)

Semifinal

2 August 2014
10:00

Report
New Zealand
35 – 34
England

SECC Precinct
Umpires:
Sharon Kelly (AUS)
Michelle Phippard (AUS)
Reserve umpire:
Rachael Ayre (AUS)
Brown 16/20 (80%)
Halpenny 4/6 (67%)
Tutaia 15/25 (60%)

K. Corbin 14/22 (64%)
Harten 20/25 (80%)

Bronze final

3 August 2014
10:00

Report
England
48 – 52
Jamaica (bronze)

SSE Hydro
Umpires:
Jonathan Bredin (NZL)
Sharon Kelly (AUS)
Reserve umpire:
Michelle Phippard (AUS)
Corbin 22/26 (85%)
Harten 26/29 (90%)

Aiken 44/52 (85%)
Beckford 8/15 (53%)

== Rugby sevens ==
The Rugby Football Union announced their squad of 12 for the Commonwealth Games on 10 July.

The squad consists of Dan Bibby, John Brake, Mark Bright, Phil Burgess, Mike Ellery, Charlie Hayter, Christian Lewis-Platt, Tom Mitchell (Captain), Dan Norton, Tom Powell, James Rodwell and Marcus Watson.

Pool D

Team	Pld	W	D	L	PF	PA	PD	Pts	Qualification
Australia	3	3	0	0	120	19	+101	9	Medal competition
England	3	2	0	1	104	15	+89	7	Medal competition
Uganda	3	1	0	2	22	97	−75	5	Bowl competition
Sri Lanka	3	0	0	3	21	136	−115	3	Bowl competition

26 July 2014
13:34

England	57–0	Sri Lanka
	Report

Ibrox Stadium, Glasgow

26 July 2014
18:24

England	40–0	Uganda
	Report

Ibrox Stadium, Glasgow

26 July 2014
21:48

England	7–15	Australia
	Report

Ibrox Stadium, Glasgow

Quarterfinal

27 July 2014
12:50

Samoa	15–14	England
	Report

Ibrox Stadium, Glasgow

Plate competition semifinal

27 July 2014
18:22

England	15–12	Scotland
	Report

Ibrox Stadium, Glasgow

Plate competition final

27 July 2014
20:38

Wales	15–17	England
	Report

Ibrox Stadium, Glasgow

== Shooting ==
British Shooting announced the squad for some of the rifle and pistol events on 23 April with the remainder of the squad to be named on 8 May. The squad for the clay target events was eventually announced on 10 June.

Men
Pistol/Small bore

Athlete	Event	Qualification		Final	
Athlete	Event	Points	Rank	Points	Rank
Mick Gault OBE	10 m air pistol	569	5 Q	176.5	3rd place, bronze medalist(s)
Stewart Nangle	10 m air pistol	578	2 Q	135.9	5
Kristian Callaghan	25 m rapid fire pistol	559	4 Q	17	3rd place, bronze medalist(s)
Kristian Callaghan	50 m pistol	547	2 Q	128.0	5
Mick Gault OBE	50 m pistol	529	13	did not advance	
Kenny Parr	10 m air rifle	623.4	2 Q	140.3	5
Daniel Rivers	10 m air rifle	623.6	1 Q	182.4	3rd place, bronze medalist(s)
Kenny Parr	50 m rifle prone	620.8	2 Q	182.0	3rd place, bronze medalist(s)
Daniel Rivers	50 m rifle prone	611.4	20	did not advance	
Kenny Parr	50 m rifle 3 positions	1154	3 Q	401.9	6
Daniel Rivers	50 m rifle 3 positions	1157	1 Q	452.9 FGR	1st place, gold medalist(s)

Shotgun

Athlete	Event	Qualification		Semifinals		Final/BM	
Athlete	Event	Points	Rank	Points	Rank	Points	Rank
Aaron Heading	Trap	119	2 Q	14	2 QG	9	2nd place, silver medalist(s)
Dave Sipling	Trap	101	23	did not advance			
Matthew French	Double trap	132	3 Q	27	2 QG	29	2nd place, silver medalist(s)
Steve Scott	Double trap	132	4 Q	27	1 QG	30	1st place, gold medalist(s)
Mike Gilligan	Skeet	112	14	did not advance			
Rory Warlow	Skeet	118	6 Q	12	3 QB	14	3rd place, bronze medalist(s)

Full bore

Athlete	Event	Stage 1	Stage 2	Stage 3	Total	
Athlete	Event	Points	Points	Points	Points	Rank
David Luckman	Individual	104–11v	149–21v	148–10v	401–42v GR	1st place, gold medalist(s)
Parag Patel FRCS	Individual	103–13v	149–17v	142–5v	394–35v	3rd place, bronze medalist(s)
David Luckman; Parag Patel FRCS	Pairs	300–43v	295–34v	—N/a	595–77v GR	1st place, gold medalist(s)

Women
Pistol/Small bore

Athlete	Event	Qualification		Semifinals		Final	
Athlete	Event	Points	Rank	Points	Rank	Points	Rank
Gerri Buckley	10 metre air pistol	366	17	—N/a		did not advance	
Victoria Mullin	10 metre air pistol	365	18	—N/a		did not advance	
Gerri Buckley	25 m pistol	569	6 Q	8	8	did not advance	
Victoria Mullin	25 m pistol	562	10	did not advance			
Sheree Cox	10 m air rifle	406.8	15	—N/a		did not advance	
Larissa Sykes	10 m air rifle	406.6	16	—N/a		did not advance	
Lina Jones	50 m rifle prone	—N/a				615.4	5
Sharon Lee	50 m rifle prone	—N/a				609.8	16
Sheree Cox	50 m rifle 3 positions	558	16	—N/a		did not advance	
Hannah Pugsley	50 m rifle 3 positions	562	13	—N/a		did not advance	

Shotgun

Athlete	Event	Qualification		Semifinals		Final/BM	
Athlete	Event	Points	Rank	Points	Rank	Points	Rank
Charlotte Kerwood	Trap	64	10	did not advance			
Caroline Povey	Trap	67	5 Q	11	3 QB	12	3rd place, bronze medalist(s)
Charlotte Kerwood	Double trap	—N/a				94	1st place, gold medalist(s)
Rachel Parish	Double trap	—N/a				91	3rd place, bronze medalist(s)
Sarah Gray	Skeet	65	6 Q	13(1)	3 QB	12	4
Amber Hill	Skeet	65	7	did not advance			

== Squash ==
Initially England Squash & Racketball announced a squad of 9 for the games on 4 June. Sarah Kippax was later added to the team on 16 June.

Individual

Athlete	Event	Round of 128	Round of 64	Round of 32	Round of 16	Quarterfinals	Semifinals	Final	Rank
Athlete	Event	Opposition Score	Opposition Score	Opposition Score	Opposition Score	Opposition Score	Opposition Score	Opposition Score	Rank
Nick Matthew (1)	Men's singles	Bye	X Koenig (MRI); W 3–0	C Binnie (JAM); W 3–0	A Clyne (SCO); W 3–0	Chris Simpson (GUE); W 3–0	P Barker (ENG); W 3–0	J Willstrop (ENG); W 3–2	1st place, gold medalist(s)
James Willstrop (2)	Men's singles	Bye	N Kyme (BER); W 3–0	A Brindle (GIB); W 3–0	M Knight (NZL); W 3–0	I Yuen (MAS); W 3–0	S Ghosal (IND); W 3–0	N Matthew (ENG); L 2–3	2nd place, silver medalist(s)
Peter Barker (3)	Men's singles	Bye	M Chilambwe (ZAM); W 3–0	M Mangaonkar (IND); W 3–0	M N Mohd Adnan (MAS); W 3–0	C Pilley (AUS); W 3–0	N Matthew (ENG); L 0–3	Bronze final S Ghosal (IND); W 3–1	3rd place, bronze medalist(s)
Laura Massaro (2)	Women's singles	—N/a	Bye	L Vai (PNG); W 3–0	N Fernandes (GUY); W 3–1	W W Low (MAS); W 3–0	A Waters (ENG); W 3–1	N David (MAS); L 0–3	2nd place, silver medalist(s)
Alison Waters (4)	Women's singles	—N/a	Bye	E Webb (PNG); W 3–0	R Grinham (AUS); W 3–1	D Pallikal (IND); W 3–1	L Massaro (ENG); L 1–3	Bronze final J King (NZL); L 0–3	4
Jenny Duncalf (8)	Women's singles	—N/a	Bye	A Landers-Murphy (NZL); W 3–0	S Cornett (CAN); W 3–0	N David (MAS); L 1–3	did not advance		

Doubles

Athletes	Event	Group Stage				Round of 16	Quarterfinal	Semifinal	Final	Rank
Athletes	Event	Opposition Score	Opposition Score	Opposition Score	Rank	Opposition Score	Opposition Score	Opposition Score	Opposition Score	Rank
Adrian Grant & Nick Matthew (1)	Men's doubles	Arjoon & Seth (GUY); W 2–0	Hindle & Zammit-Lewis (MLT); W 2–0	Walsh & Wei (PNG); W 2–0	1 Q	Binnie & Burrowes (JAM); W 2–0	Creed & Evans (WAL); W 2–0	Clyne & Leitch (SCO); W 2–0	Palmer & Pilley (AUS); L 1–2	2nd place, silver medalist(s)
Daryl Selby & James Willstrop (3)	Men's doubles	Lengwe & Ndhlovu (ZAM); W 2–0	Brindle & Navas (GIB); W 2–0	Bailey & Doyle (SVG); W 2–0	1 Q	Fitzgerald & Haley (WAL); W 2–0	Beddoes & Coll (NZL); W 2–1	Palmer & Pilley (AUS); L 0–2	Bronze final Clyne & Leitch (SCO); W 2–0	3rd place, bronze medalist(s)
Jenny Duncalf & Laura Massaro (1)	Women's doubles	Evans & Saffery (WAL); W 2–0	Vai & Webb (PNG); W 2–0	Knaggs & Sample (TRI); W 2–0	1 Q	—N/a	Camilleri & Urquhart (AUS); W 2–0	Beddoes & Waters (ENG); W 2–0	Pallikal & Chinappa (IND); L 0–2	2nd place, silver medalist(s)
Emma Beddoes & Alison Waters (3)	Women's doubles	King & Landers-Murphy (NZL); W 2–1	Clark & Gillen-Buchert (SCO); W 2–0	Boyce & Morova (PNG); W 2–0	1 Q	—N/a	David & Low (MAS); W 2–0	Duncalf & Massaro (ENG); L 0–2	Bronze final Brown & Grinham (AUS); W 2–0	3rd place, bronze medalist(s)
Alison Waters & Peter Barker (4)	Mixed doubles	Evans & Creed (WAL); W 2–1	Knaggs & Ramasra (TRI); W 2–0	Sultana & Zammit-Lewis (MLT); W 2–0	1 Q	Craig & Perry (NIR); W 2–1	Selby & Kippax (ENG); W 2–1	Knight & King (NZL); W 2–0	Palmer & Grinham (AUS); L 0–2	2nd place, silver medalist(s)
Daryl Selby & Sarah Kippax (6)	Mixed doubles	Saffery & Evans (WAL); W 2–1	Sample & Wilson (TRI); W 2–0	Florens & Koenig (MRI); W 2–0	1 Q	Delierre & Cornett (CAN); W 2–0	Waters & Barker (ENG); L 1–2	did not advance		

== Swimming ==
On 7 May Commonwealth Games England announced a squad of 39 swimmers consisting of 20 men and 19 women.

Men

Athlete	Event	Heat		Semifinal		Final	
Athlete	Event	Time	Rank	Time	Rank	Time	Rank
Adam Brown	50 m freestyle	22.66	8 Q	22.55	8 Q	22.62	8
James Disney-May	50 m freestyle	23.04	14 Q	23.26	16	did not advance	
Benjamin Proud	50 m freestyle	22.21	3 Q	21.76 GR	1 Q	21.92	1st place, gold medalist(s)
Adam Brown	100 m freestyle	49.60	3 Q	49.47	5 Q	49.63	6
James Disney-May	100 m freestyle	50.25	9 Q	50.01	8 Q	49.96	8
Benjamin Proud	100 m freestyle	50.69	=14 Q	50.06	9	did not advance	
Lewis Coleman	200 m freestyle	1:50.75	18	—N/a		did not advance	
Nick Grainger	200 m freestyle	1:48.98	=8 Q^{[a]}	—N/a		1:49.69	8
James Guy	200 m freestyle	1:47.21	6 Q	—N/a		1:46.84	6
Thomas Hamer	200 m freestyle S14	2:02.11	3 Q	—N/a		2:00.27	2nd place, silver medalist(s)
Daniel Fogg	400 m freestyle	3:55.98	15	—N/a		did not advance	
James Guy	400 m freestyle	3:47.27	6 Q	—N/a		3:44.58	3rd place, bronze medalist(s)
Daniel Fogg	1500 m freestyle	15:10.88	=6 Q	—N/a		15:13.72	7
Jay Lelliott	1500 m freestyle	15:11.89	8 Q	—N/a		15:05.83	6
Max Litchfield	1500 m freestyle	15:33.87	12	—N/a		did not advance	
Liam Tancock	50 m backstroke	25.49	5 Q	25.21	5 Q	24.98	3rd place, bronze medalist(s)
Chris Walker-Hebborn	50 m backstroke	25.12	1 Q	24.92	2 Q	25.14	4
Liam Tancock	100 m backstroke	54.51	5 Q	53.49	2 Q	53.75	= (bronze)
Chris Walker-Hebborn	100 m backstroke	53.30 GR	1 Q	53.57	3 Q	53.12 GR	1st place, gold medalist(s)
Roberto Pavoni	200 m backstroke	DNS		—N/a		did not advance	
Adam Peaty	50 m breaststroke	27.00 GR	1 Q	26.99	2 Q	26.78	2nd place, silver medalist(s)
James Wilby	50 m breaststroke	28.36	11 Q	28.60	11	did not advance	
Adam Peaty	100 m breaststroke	59.47 GR	1 Q	59.16 GR	1 Q	58.94 GR	1st place, gold medalist(s)
James Wilby	100 m breaststroke	1:01.40	7 Q	1:00.94	8 Q	1:01.07	7
Andrew Willis	100 m breaststroke	1:01.48	8 Q	1:01.35	9	did not advance	
Adam Peaty	200 m breaststroke	2:10.80	5 Q	—N/a		2:10.02	4
James Wilby	200 m breaststroke	2:11.62	6 Q	—N/a		2:11.53	6
Andrew Willis	200 m breaststroke	2:10.50 GR	4 Q	—N/a		2:09.87	3rd place, bronze medalist(s)
Adam Barrett	50 m butterfly	23.68	4 Q	23.41	4 Q	23.43	4
Benjamin Proud	50 m butterfly	23.17	1 Q	23.16	1 Q	22.93 GR	1st place, gold medalist(s)
Adam Barrett	100 m butterfly	53.13	4 Q	52.00	1 Q	51.93	3rd place, bronze medalist(s)
James Guy	100 m butterfly	53.28	6 Q	52.78	6 Q	52.63	6
Joseph Roebuck	100 m butterfly	53.67	11 Q	53.29	10	did not advance	
Roberto Pavoni	200 m butterfly	1:58.49	8 Q	—N/a		1:58.03	7
Joseph Roebuck	200 m butterfly	1:59.14	10	—N/a		did not advance	
Lewis Coleman	200 m individual medley	2:04.63	14	—N/a		did not advance	
Roberto Pavoni	200 m individual medley	1:59.79	4 Q	—N/a		1:59.30	5
Joseph Roebuck	200 m individual medley	2:00.46	5 Q	—N/a		1:59.33	6
Oliver Hynd MBE	200 m individual medley SM8	2:26.94	1 Q	—N/a		2:22.86	1st place, gold medalist(s)
Max Litchfield	400 m individual medley	4:25.08	12	—N/a		did not advance	
Roberto Pavoni	400 m individual medley	4:15.26	3 Q	—N/a		4:14.42	4
Adam Barrett; Adam Brown; Lewis Coleman*; James Disney-May; Benjamin Proud; Chris Walker-Hebborn*	4 × 100 m freestyle relay	3:18.83	2 Q	—N/a		3:16.37	3rd place, bronze medalist(s)
Lewis Coleman; Daniel Fogg*; Nick Grainger; James Guy; Jay Lelliott*; Max Litchfield*; Roberto Pavoni*; Josh Walsh	4 × 200 m freestyle relay	7:25.04	6 Q	—N/a		7:12.66	4
Adam Barrett; Adam Brown; James Disney-May*; James Guy*; Adam Peaty; Liam Tancock*; Chris Walker-Hebborn; James Wilby*	4 × 100 m medley relay	3:38.39	3 Q	—N/a		3:31.51 GR	1st place, gold medalist(s)

^{a} Nick Grainger finished in equal eighth position in the heats alongside Canada's Ryan Cochrane and Ieuan Lloyd from Wales. A swim-off was held between the three competitors which Grainger won and was awarded with the eighth and last qualification place in to the final.

Women

Athlete	Event	Heat		Semifinal		Final	
Athlete	Event	Time	Rank	Time	Rank	Time	Rank
Francesca Halsall	50 m freestyle	24.31 GR	1 Q	24.14 GR	1 Q	23.96 GR	1st place, gold medalist(s)
Jess Lloyd	50 m freestyle	25.64	11 Q	25.59	10	did not advance	
Amy Smith	50 m freestyle	25.08	6 Q	25.09	6 Q	25.37	8
Francesca Halsall	100 m freestyle	54.42	=3 Q	54.88	5 Q	53.99	4
Amy Smith	100 m freestyle	55.99	10 Q	55.77	9	did not advance	
Rebecca Turner	100 m freestyle	56.02	11 Q	55.95	11	did not advance	
Stephanie Slater	100 m freestyle S8	1:07.38	2 Q	—N/a		1:05.73	2nd place, silver medalist(s)
Ellie Faulkner	200 m freestyle	1:59.40	11	—N/a		did not advance	
Siobhan-Marie O'Connor	200 m freestyle	1:56.58	2 Q	—N/a		1:55.82	2nd place, silver medalist(s)
Rebecca Turner	200 m freestyle	1:59.62	12	—N/a		did not advance	
Ellie Faulkner	400 m freestyle	4:10.94	8 Q	—N/a		4:08.92	7
Rebecca Turner	400 m freestyle	4:20.55	18	—N/a		did not advance	
Aimee Willmott	400 m freestyle	4:12.28	11	—N/a		did not advance	
Ellie Faulkner	800 m freestyle	DNS		—N/a		did not advance	
Jessica Fullalove	50 m backstroke	29.43	11 Q	29.42	11	did not advance	
Lauren Quigley	50 m backstroke	28.39	3 Q	27.72	2 Q	27.69	2nd place, silver medalist(s)
Elizabeth Simmonds	50 m backstroke	29.00	7 Q	28.63	7 Q	28.54	6
Jessica Fullalove	100 m backstroke	1:01.58	11 Q	1:01.20	11	did not advance	
Lauren Quigley	100 m backstroke	1:00.67	4 Q	1:00.37	8 Q	1:00.19	4
Elizabeth Simmonds	100 m backstroke	1:00.79	6 Q	59.98	=4 Q	1:00.26	5
Jessica Fullalove	200 m backstroke	2:15.95	9	—N/a		did not advance	
Lauren Quigley	200 m backstroke	2:13.45	8 Q	—N/a		2:09.51	5
Elizabeth Simmonds	200 m backstroke	2:10.81	2 Q	—N/a		2:09.29	4
Molly Renshaw	50 m breaststroke	32.72	13 Q	32.47	13	did not advance	
Sophie Taylor	50 m breaststroke	30.56	2 Q	30.86	5 Q	31.08	4
Sophie Allen	100 m breaststroke	1:10.95	17	did not advance			
Molly Renshaw	100 m breaststroke	1:10.29	13 Q	1:09.39	12	did not advance	
Sophie Taylor	100 m breaststroke	1:07.77	1 Q	1:07.20	2 Q	1:06.35	1st place, gold medalist(s)
Danielle Lowe	200 m breaststroke	2:33.88	13	—N/a		did not advance	
Molly Renshaw	200 m breaststroke	2:25.75	2 Q	—N/a		2:25.00	3rd place, bronze medalist(s)
Sophie Taylor	200 m breaststroke	2:30.66	11	—N/a		did not advance	
Francesca Halsall	50 m butterfly	25.64 GR	1 Q	25.36 GR	1 Q	25.20 GR	1st place, gold medalist(s)
Rachael Kelly	50 m butterfly	26.92	=10 Q	26.68	10	did not advance	
Amy Smith	50 m butterfly	26.44	=5 Q	26.43	6 Q	26.24	4
Tilly Gray	100 m butterfly	1:01.03	13 Q	1:00.66	13	did not advance	
Rachael Kelly	100 m butterfly	58.67	5 Q	59.02	8 Q	58.61	5
Siobhan-Marie O'Connor	100 m butterfly	58.24	3 Q	57.57	1 Q	57.45	2nd place, silver medalist(s)
Tilly Gray	200 m butterfly	2:14.68	12	—N/a		did not advance	
Elena Sheridan	200 m butterfly	2:12.39	10	—N/a		did not advance	
Aimee Willmott	200 m butterfly	2:09.60	4 Q	—N/a		2:08.07	2nd place, silver medalist(s)
Sophie Allen	200 m individual medley	2:14.68	7 Q	—N/a		2:12.01	6
Siobhan-Marie O'Connor	200 m individual medley	2:11.42	1 Q	—N/a		2:08.21 GR	1st place, gold medalist(s)
Aimee Willmott	200 m individual medley	2:12.55	4 Q	—N/a		2:11.25	4
Danielle Lowe	400 m individual medley	4:48.09	7 Q	—N/a		4:48.95	8
Aimee Willmott	400 m individual medley	4:39.50	2 Q	—N/a		4:33.01 NR	2nd place, silver medalist(s)
Francesca Halsall; Jess Lloyd*; Amelia Maughan*; Siobhan-Marie O'Connor; Lauren Quigley*; Amy Smith; Rebecca Turner	4 × 100 m freestyle relay	3:40.88	2 Q	—N/a		3:35.72	2nd place, silver medalist(s)
Ellie Faulkner; Jess Lloyd*; Amelia Maughan; Siobhan-Marie O'Connor; Rebecca Turner; Aimee Willmott*	4 × 200 m freestyle relay	8:02.64	3 Q	—N/a		7:52.45	3rd place, bronze medalist(s)
Francesca Halsall; Rachael Kelly*; Siobhan-Marie O'Connor; Lauren Quigley; Molly Renshaw*; Elizabeth Simmonds*; Amy Smith*; Sophie Taylor	4 × 100m medley relay	4:04.56	2 Q	—N/a		3:57.03	2nd place, silver medalist(s)

Qualifiers for the latter rounds (Q) of all events were decided on a time only basis, therefore positions shown are overall results versus competitors in all heats.
* – Indicates athlete swam in the preliminaries but not in the final race.

== Table tennis ==
On 5 June Table Tennis England announced a squad of 10 for the games.

Singles

Athletes	Event	Preliminary round			First round	Second round	Third round	Quarterfinal	Semifinal	Final	Rank
Athletes	Event	Opposition Score	Opposition Score	Rank	Opposition Score	Opposition Score	Opposition Score	Opposition Score	Opposition Score	Opposition Score	Rank
Andrew Baggaley	Men's singles	Bye				Shakirin (MAS); W 4–0	Z Wang (CAN); L 0–4	did not advance			
Liam Pitchford	Men's singles	Bye				P McCreery (NIR); W 4–0	B Abiodun (NGR); W 4–0	S Ghosh (IND); W 4–2	N Gao (SIN); L 3–4	Bronze final S Kamal (IND); W 4–2	3rd place, bronze medalist(s)
Paul Drinkhall	Men's singles	Bye				T Liu (NZL); W 4–1	R Jenkins (WAL); W 4–0	S Kamal (IND); L 1–4	did not advance		
Joanna Drinkhall	Women's singles	Bye				O Edem (NGR); W 4–0	N Owen (WAL); L 1–4	did not advance			
Tin-Tin Ho	Women's singles	A Lukaaya (UGA); W 4–0	S Shareef (MDV); W 4–0	1 Q	Bye	M Yu (SIN); L 1–4	did not advance				
Kelly Sibley	Women's singles	Bye				S K Ng (MAS); W WO	Y Lin (SIN); L 1–4	did not advance			

Doubles

Athletes	Event	First round	Second round	Third round	Fourth round	Quarterfinal	Semifinal	Final	Rank
Athletes	Event	Opposition Score	Opposition Score	Opposition Score	Opposition Score	Opposition Score	Opposition Score	Opposition Score	Rank
Paul Drinkhall; Liam Pitchford	Men's doubles	Bye	D Abrefa & F Lartey (GHA); W 3–0	H Hu & X Yan (AUS); W 3–1	—N/a	Q Aruna & S Toriola (NGR); W 3–2	N Gao & H Li (SIN); L 1–3	Bronze final Z Yang & J Zhan (SIN); L 2–3	4
Daniel Reed; Sam Walker	Men's doubles	Bye	S Akayade & E Commey (GHA); W 3–1	N Cameron & S Doherty (SCO); W 3–0	—N/a	S Kamal & A A Arputharaj (IND); L 1–3	did not advance		
Joanna Drinkhall; Kelly Sibley	Women's doubles	Bye	S Clare & Y Foster (JAM); W 3–0	I Madurangi & E Warusawithana (SRI); W 3–0	—N/a	S Kumeresan & M S Patkar (IND); W 3–1	T Feng & M Yu (SIN); L 0–3	Bronze final A Luo & M Zhang (CAN); L 2–3	4
Tin-Tin Ho; Karina Le Fevre	Women's doubles	Bye	J A Blake & N Cummings (GUY); W WO	J F Lay & M Miao (AUS); L 0–3	—N/a	did not advance			
Paul Drinkhall; Joanna Drinkhall	Mixed doubles	Bye	G Sultan & A Benstrong (SEY); W 3–1	X Yan & Z Zhang (AUS); W 3–0	A Ho & A Luo (CAN); W 3–2	N Gao & Y Lin (SIN); W 3–1	D Reed & K Sibley (ENG); W 3–2	L Pitchford & T Ho (ENG); W 3–2	1st place, gold medalist(s)
Liam Pitchford; Tin-Tin Ho	Mixed doubles	Bye	H Lulu & P Matariki (VAN); W 3–0	R Jenkins & C Carey (WAL); W 3–0	T Liu & K Li (NZL); W 3–0	Z Wang & M Zhang (CAN); W 3–2	J Zhan & T Feng (SIN); W 3–2	P Drinkhall & J Drinkhall (ENG); L 2–3	2nd place, silver medalist(s)
Daniel Reed; Kelly Sibley	Mixed doubles	Bye	A Yogarajah & W Gukhool (MRI); W 3–0	N Cameron & G Edwards (SCO); W 3–0	H Li & M Yu (SIN); W 3–0	S Kamal & S Kumaresan (IND); W 3–2	P Drinkhall & J Drinkhall (ENG); L 2–3	Bronze final J Zhan & T Feng (SIN); W 3–1	3rd place, bronze medalist(s)
Sam Walker; Karina Le Fevre	Mixed doubles	Bye	M A Dowell & A Riley (BAR); W 3–0	S Ghosh & P Ghatak (IND); W 3–2	W Henzell & M Miao (AUS); L 2–3	did not advance			

Team

Athletes	Event	Preliminary round				First round	Quarterfinal	Semifinal	Final	Rank
Athletes	Event	Opposition Score	Opposition Score	Opposition Score	Rank	Opposition Score	Opposition Score	Opposition Score	Opposition Score	Rank
Andrew Baggaley; Paul Drinkhall; Liam Pitchford; Daniel Reed; Sam Walker	Men's team	Jamaica; W 3–0	Trinidad and Tobago; W 3–0	Barbados; W 3–0	=1 Q	Bye	Wales; W 3–0	India; W 3–1	Singapore; L 1–3	2nd place, silver medalist(s)
Joanna Drinkhall; Hannah Hicks; Tin-Tin Ho; Karina Le Fevre; Kelly Sibley	Women's team	Ghana; W 3–0	Trinidad and Tobago; W 3–0	Tanzania; W 3–0	1 Q	Bye	Malaysia; L 2–3	did not advance		

== Triathlon ==
Individual

Athlete	Event	Swim (1.5 km)	Trans 1	Bike (40 km)	Trans 2	Run (10 km)	Total time	Rank
Alistair Brownlee MBE	Men's	18:00	0:34	58:34	0:24	31:09	1:48:50	1st place, gold medalist(s)
Jonathan Brownlee	Men's	17:58	0:34	58:45	0:23	31:21	1:49:01	2nd place, silver medalist(s)
Aaron Harris	Men's	18:39	0:34	59:12	0:23	32:01	1:50:49	6
Lucy Hall	Women's	19:33	0:35	1:04:03	0:26	40:36	2:05:13	11
Vicky Holland	Women's	19:35	0:35	1:04:00	0:24	34:37	1:59:11	3rd place, bronze medalist(s)
Jodie Stimpson	Women's	19:37	0:32	1:04:01	0:25	34:21	1:58:56	1st place, gold medalist(s)

Mixed Relay

Athletes	Event	Total times per athlete (Swim 250 m, Bike 6 km, Run 1.6 km)	Total group time	Rank
Vicky Holland; Jonathan Brownlee; Jodie Stimpson; Alistair Brownlee MBE	Mixed relay	18:59; 17:29; 19:20; 17:36	1:13:24	1st place, gold medalist(s)

== Weightlifting ==
On 30 May Commonwealth Games England announced the selection of a squad of 16 weightlifters and powerlifters.

Men

Athlete	Event	Weight lifted		Total	Rank
Athlete	Event	Snatch	Clean & jerk	Total	Rank
Jaswant Shergill	62 kg	110	140	250	11
Christopher Freebury	69 kg	130	150	280	8
Shaun Clegg	69 kg	124	—	—	—
Jack Oliver	77 kg	142	171	313	4
Bradley Burrowes	85 kg	140	—	—	—
Owen Boxall	94 kg	150	181	331	4
Sonny Webster	94 kg	147	180	327	5
Ben Watson	105 kg	157	180	337	3rd place, bronze medalist(s)

Women

Athlete	Event	Weight lifted		Total	Rank
Athlete	Event	Snatch	Clean & jerk	Total	Rank
Joanne Calvino	48 kg	66	84	150	5
Zoe Smith	58 kg	92	118	210	1st place, gold medalist(s)
Emily Godley	63 kg	88	108	196	5
Sarah Davies	63 kg	83	105	188	7
Rebekah Tiler	69 kg	91	118	209	4
Mercy Brown	75 kg	91	112	203	4

Powerlifting

Athlete	Event	Total lifted	Factored weight	Rank
Natalie Blake	Women's 61 kg	95.0	100.2	2nd place, silver medalist(s)
Ali Jawad	Men's 72 kg	194.0 WR	209.4	3rd place, bronze medalist(s)

== Wrestling ==
Commonwealth Games England announced a squad of 13 wrestlers on 8 June.

Men's freestyle

Athlete	Event	Round of 32	Round of 16	Quarterfinal	Semifinal	Repechage	Final / BM	
Athlete	Event	Opposition Result	Opposition Result	Opposition Result	Opposition Result	Opposition Result	Opposition Result	Rank
Omar Tafail	−57 kg	—N/a	Bye	E Welson (NGR); L0–4	Did not advance	Bye	Bronze final C Pilling (WAL); L 1–3	4
Sasha Madyarchyk	−61 kg	—N/a	B Bajrang (IND); L 0–4	did not advance		M Plaatjies (RSA); W 5–0	Bronze final A Daniel (NGR); L 1–4	4
George Ramm	−61 kg	—N/a	D Swart (AUS); W 4–1	V Etko (SCO); L 1–4	did not advance			
Phillip Roberts	−65 kg	—N/a	M Salman (PAK); L 1–3	did not advance				
Michael Grundy	−74 kg	Bye	R Djoumessi (CMR); W 4–0	G Meyer (RSA); W 3–1	Q Abbas (PAK); L 0–5	—N/a	Bronze final D Galea (MLT); W 4–0	3rd place, bronze medalist(s)
Leon Rattigan	−97 kg	—N/a	A Shikongo (NAM); W 3–1	U Tariq (PAK); W 3–1	S Kadian (IND); L 1–3	—N/a	Bronze final S Tamerau (NGR); W 4–1	3rd place, bronze medalist(s)
Chinu Xxx	−125 kg	—N/a	C K Mbianga (CMR); W 3–1	Z Anwar (PAK); W 3–1	K Jarvis (CAN); L 1–4	—N/a	Bronze final H O Mkanga (KEN); W 4–1	3rd place, bronze medalist(s)

Women's freestyle

Athlete	Event	Round of 16	Quarterfinal	Semifinal	Final / BM	
Athlete	Event	Opposition Result	Opposition Result	Opposition Result	Opposition Result	Rank
Yana Rattigan	−48 kg	—N/a	F Robertson (SCO); W 5–0	R Muambo (CMR); W 5–0	Vinesh (IND); L 1–3	2nd place, silver medalist(s)
Louisa Porogovska	−55 kg	Bye	C Murphy (SCO); W 3–0	B Kumari (IND); L 0–5	Bronze final K Marsh (SCO); W 3–1	3rd place, bronze medalist(s)
Olga Butkevych	−58 kg	Bye	B R Stone (CAN); L 1–3	did not advance		
Sarah Grundy	−58 kg	N Gordon (RSA); W 3–1	A Adeniyi (NGR); L 0–4	Did not advance	Bronze final T Ford (NZL); L 0–5	4
Chloe Spiteri	−63 kg	Bye	L W Ndgundu (KEN); W 4–0	D Lappage (CAN); L 0–4	Bronze final B Oborududu (NGR); L 1–3	4

Athlete	Event	Nordic round				
Athlete	Event	Opposition Result	Opposition Result	Opposition Result	Opposition Result	Rank
Sophie Edwards	−75 kg	E Wiebe (CAN); L 0–4	A Ali (CMR); L 0–4	Jyoti (IND); L 1–4	B Onyebuchi (NGR); L 0–4	5
