= Swimming at the 2014 Commonwealth Games – Men's 100 metre freestyle =

Men's 100 metre freestyle at the 2014 Commonwealth Games
- Venue: Tollcross International Swimming Centre
- Dates: 26 July 2014 (heats & semis); 27 July 2014 (final)
- Competitors: 66 from 37 nations
- Winning time: 48.11

Medalists
gold medal	James Magnussen	Australia
silver medal	Cameron McEvoy	Australia
bronze medal	Tommaso D'Orsogna	Australia

The men's 100 metre freestyle event at the 2014 Commonwealth Games as part of the swimming programme took place on 26 and 27 July at the Tollcross International Swimming Centre in Glasgow, Scotland.

The medals were presented by Cliff Williams, Secretary General of The Antigua and Barbuda Olympic Association and the quaichs were presented by Steve Montgomery, Managing Director of First ScotRail.

== Records ==
Prior to this competition, the existing world and Commonwealth Games records were as follows.

World record	César Cielo (BRA)	46.91	Rome, Italy	30 July 2009
Commonwealth record	Eamon Sullivan (AUS)	47.05	Beijing, China	13 August 2008
Games record	Brent Hayden (CAN)	47.98	Delhi, India	7 October 2010

== Results ==
=== Heats ===
Rank	Heat	Lane	Name	Nationality	Time	Notes
1	9	4	James Magnussen	Australia	48.47	Q
2	8	4	Cameron McEvoy	Australia	49.46	Q
3	7	4	Adam Brown	England	49.60	Q
4	8	6	Leith Shankland	South Africa	49.64	Q
5	9	6	Dylan Carter	Trinidad and Tobago	49.72	Q
6	9	5	Tommaso D'Orsogna	Australia	49.73	Q
7	7	3	Yuri Kisil	Canada	49.85	Q
8	9	3	Calum Jarvis	Wales	50.05	Q
9	8	3	James Disney-May	England	50.25	Q
10	8	7	Bradley Vincent	Mauritius	50.59	Q
11	7	7	Jason Dunford	Kenya	50.60	Q
12	9	2	Curtis Coulter	Northern Ireland	50.63	Q
13	8	1	Otto Putland	Wales	50.66	Q
=14	7	5	Benjamin Proud	England	50.69	Q
=14	9	7	Clayton Jimmie	South Africa	50.69	Q
16	8	5	Roy-Allan Burch	Bermuda	50.84	Q
17	9	1	Clement Lim	Singapore	50.93	
18	8	2	David Thompson	Northern Ireland	51.15	
19	7	6	Caydon Muller	South Africa	51.27	
20	7	8	Welson Sim	Malaysia	51.51	
21	3	2	Lim Ching Hwang	Malaysia	51.65	
22	7	2	Danny Yeo	Singapore	51.84	
23	6	4	Tom Gallichan	Jersey	52.00	
24	1	4	Jevon Atkinson	Jamaica	52.03	
25	9	8	Miles Munro	Guernsey	52.06	
26	6	2	Ifalemi Sau Paea	Tonga	52.76	
27	6	5	Mathieu Marquet	Mauritius	52.94	
28	6	3	Mahfizur Rahman Sagor	Bangladesh	52.97	
29	8	8	Alexandre Bakhtiarov	Cyprus	52.99	
30	6	6	Conor Munn	Northern Ireland	53.30	
31	6	7	Joshua Daniel	Saint Lucia	53.55	
32	5	7	Issa Mohamed	Kenya	53.96	
33	5	4	Alex Bregazzi	Isle of Man	54.00	
34	6	1	Tom Bielich	Isle of Man	54.01	
35	5	6	Meli Malani	Fiji	54.05	
36	5	1	Igor Mogne	Mozambique	54.10	
37	5	5	James Sanderson	Gibraltar	54.61	
=38	4	5	Shakil Fakir	Mozambique	55.08	
=38	6	8	Cherantha de Silva	Sri Lanka	55.08	
=40	4	4	William Clark	Fiji	55.09	
=40	5	2	Stanford Kawale	Papua New Guinea	55.09	
42	3	1	Adam Viktora	Seychelles	55.10	
43	5	3	Steven Maina	Kenya	55.41	
44	3	6	Abeiku Jackson	Ghana	56.47	
45	4	6	Brandon Schuster	Samoa	56.59	
46	4	1	Abbiw Jackson	Ghana	56.87	
47	4	2	J'air Smith	Antigua and Barbuda	57.08	
48	3	4	Ammaar Ghadiyali	Tanzania	57.50	
49	1	5	Chris Regis	Grenada	57.74	
50	3	8	Matthew Shone	Zambia	57.97	
51	3	5	Sikandar Khan	Pakistan	57.99	
52	3	7	Dean Hoffman	Seychelles	58.07	
53	4	3	Israr Hussain	Pakistan	58.36	
54	1	3	Andrew Hopkin	Grenada	58.50	
55	4	8	Nishwan Ibrahim	Maldives	58.74	
56	2	4	Collin Akara	Papua New Guinea	59.18	
57	3	3	Nikolas Sylvester	Saint Vincent and the Grenadines	59.43	
58	2	3	Tong Li Panuve	Tonga	1:00.34	
59	4	7	Mohamed Adnan	Maldives	1:01.24	
60	2	2	Storm Halbich	Saint Vincent and the Grenadines	1:01.90	
61	2	7	Dillon Gooding	Saint Vincent and the Grenadines	1:01.93	
62	2	1	Ben Dillon	Saint Helena	1:01.94	
63	2	6	Patrick Rukundo	Rwanda	1:03.36	
	2	5	Nana Antwi	Ghana		DNS
	5	8	Emidio Cuna	Mozambique		DNS
	7	1	Ieuan Lloyd	Wales		DNS

=== Semifinals ===
Rank	Heat	Lane	Name	Nationality	Time	Notes
1	2	4	James Magnussen	Australia	48.21	Q
2	1	4	Cameron McEvoy	Australia	48.60	Q
3	1	3	Tommaso D'Orsogna	Australia	49.05	Q
4	1	5	Leith Shankland	South Africa	49.35	Q
5	2	5	Adam Brown	England	49.47	Q
6	2	3	Dylan Carter	Trinidad and Tobago	49.50	Q
7	2	6	Yuri Kisil	Canada	49.53	Q
8	2	2	James Disney-May	England	50.01	Q
9	1	1	Benjamin Proud	England	50.06	
10	1	6	Calum Jarvis	Wales	50.09	
11	1	8	Roy-Allan Burch	Bermuda	50.26	
12	1	7	Curtis Coulter	Northern Ireland	50.48	
13	2	8	Clayton Jimmie	South Africa	50.50	
14	1	2	Bradley Vincent	Mauritius	50.52	
15	2	1	Otto Putland	Wales	50.61	
16	2	7	Jason Dunford	Kenya	50.78	

=== Final ===
Rank	Lane	Name	Nationality	Time	Notes
1st place, gold medalist(s)	4	James Magnussen	Australia	48.11	
2nd place, silver medalist(s)	5	Cameron McEvoy	Australia	48.34	
3rd place, bronze medalist(s)	3	Tommaso D'Orsogna	Australia	49.04	
4	1	Yuri Kisil	Canada	49.27	
5	7	Dylan Carter	Trinidad and Tobago	49.56	
6	2	Adam Brown	England	49.63	
7	6	Leith Shankland	South Africa	49.81	
8	8	James Disney-May	England	49.96	
