= Swimming at the 2014 Commonwealth Games – Men's 4 × 100 metre freestyle relay =

Men's 4 × 100 metre freestyle relay at the 2014 Commonwealth Games
- Venue: Tollcross International Swimming Centre
- Dates: 25 July 2014
- Competitors: 62 from 13 nations
- Winning time: 3:13.44 GR

Medalists
gold medal	Tommaso D'Orsogna; Matthew Abood; James Magnussen; Cameron McEvoy; Ned McKendry*; Kenneth To*; Jayden Hadler*	Australia
silver medal	Chad le Clos; Roland Schoeman; Leith Shankland; Caydon Muller; Clayton Jimmie*; Calvyn Justus*	South Africa
bronze medal	Adam Brown; James Disney-May; Adam Barrett; Benjamin Proud; Lewis Coleman*; Chris Walker-Hebborn*	England

The men's 4 × 100 metre freestyle relay event at the 2014 Commonwealth Games as part of the swimming programme took place on 25 July at the Tollcross International Swimming Centre in Glasgow, Scotland.

The medals were presented by Councillor Sadie Docherty, Lord Provost of Glasgow and the quaichs were presented by Fiona Kerr, Managing Director of First Glasgow.

== Records ==
Prior to this competition, the existing world and Commonwealth Games records were as follows.

World record	United States; Michael Phelps (47.51); Garrett Weber-Gale (47.02); Cullen Jones (47.65); Jason Lezak (46.06)	3:08.24	Beijing, China	11 August 2008
Commonwealth record				
Games record	Australia; Kyle Richardson (49.23); Eamon Sullivan (47.49); Tommaso D'Orsogna (48.63); James Magnussen (48.57)	3:13.92	Delhi, India	4 October 2010

The following records were established during the competition:

Date	Event	Nation	Swimmers	Time	Record
25 July	Final	Australia	Tommaso D'Orsogna (49.26); Matthew Abood (48.77); James Magnussen (47.49); Cameron McEvoy (47.92)	3:13.44	GR

== Results ==
=== Heats ===
Rank	Heat	Lane	Nation	Swimmers	Time	Notes
1	2	4	Australia	Ned McKendry (49.58); Kenneth To (49.53); Jayden Hadler (49.27); Matthew Abood (48.53)	3:16.91	Q
2	2	5	England	Lewis Coleman (51.25); Chris Walker-Hebborn (50.08); Adam Barrett (49.12); James Disney-May (48.83)	3:18.83	Q
3	1	2	Scotland	Jack Thorpe (50.10); Richard Schafers (49.59); Kieran McGuckin (49.69); Jak Scott (50.22)	3:19.60	Q
4	2	2	South Africa	Leith Shankland (49.54); Clayton Jimmie (50.11); Caydon Muller (49.80); Calvyn Justus (50.52)	3:19.97	Q
5	1	4	Canada	Yuri Kisil (49.52); Coleman Allen (50.16); Russell Wood (50.43); Evan White (50.38)	3:20.49	Q
6	1	6	New Zealand	Ewan Jackson (51.04); Steven Kent (49.95); Corey Main (49.53); Dylan Dunlop-Barrett (50.42)	3:20.94	Q
7	2	7	Singapore	Joseph Schooling (50.05); Danny Yeo (51.34); Quah Zheng Wen (51.19); Clement Lim (50.08)	3:22.66	Q
8	1	7	Wales	Calum Jarvis (50.25); Otto Putland (50.81); Xavier Mohammed (50.93); Ieuan Lloyd (50.96)	3:22.95	Q
9	2	6	Northern Ireland	Jordan Sloan (50.80); David Thompson (50.84); Conor Munn (53.03); Curtis Coulter (49.17)	3:23.84	
10	1	3	Malaysia	Lim Ching Hwang (52.36); Welson Sim (50.90); Vernon Lee (52.32); Kevin Yeap (52.20)	3:27.78	
11	1	5	Guernsey	Miles Munro (50.75); Thomas Hollingsworth (52.78); Ben Lowndes (53.10); Jeremy Osborne (51.80)	3:28.43	
12	2	3	Isle of Man	Grant Halsall (53.23); Guy Davies (55.91); Alex Bregazzi (54.89); Tom Bielich (53.28)	3:37.31	
13	2	1	Zambia	Ralph Goveia (55.05); Matthew Shone (58.75); Milimo Mweetwa (1:00.33); Alexandros Axiotis (55.49)	3:49.62	

=== Final ===
Rank	Lane	Nation	Swimmers	Time	Notes
1st place, gold medalist(s)	4	Australia	Tommaso D'Orsogna (49.26); Matthew Abood (48.77); James Magnussen (47.49); Cameron McEvoy (47.92)	3:13.44	GR
2nd place, silver medalist(s)	6	South Africa	Chad le Clos (48.53); Roland Schoeman (48.78); Leith Shankland (48.14); Caydon Muller (49.72)	3:15.17	
3rd place, bronze medalist(s)	5	England	Adam Brown (49.47); James Disney-May (48.81); Adam Barrett (49.04); Benjamin Proud (49.05)	3:16.37	
4	3	Scotland	Robert Renwick (49.80); Richard Schafers (49.25); Kieran McGuckin (49.39); Duncan Scott (49.22)	3:17.66	
5	2	Canada	Yuri Kisil (49.77); Coleman Allen (50.27); Russell Wood (50.52); Evan White (49.12)	3:19.68	
6	8	Wales	Calum Jarvis (49.82); Otto Putland (49.95); Xavier Mohammed (50.25); Ieuan Lloyd (49.57)	3:19.82	
7	7	New Zealand	Matthew Stanley (49.97); Corey Main (50.00); Steven Kent (49.50); Ewan Jackson (50.41)	3:19.88	
8	1	Singapore	Joseph Schooling (50.24); Danny Yeo (50.17); Quah Zheng Wen (50.56); Clement Lim (50.01)	3:20.98	NR
