= Swimming at the 2014 Commonwealth Games – Men's 100 metre butterfly =

Men's 100 metre butterfly at the 2014 Commonwealth Games
- Venue: Tollcross International Swimming Centre
- Dates: 27 July 2014 (heats & semis); 28 July 2014 (final)
- Competitors: 38 from 26 nations
- Winning time: 51.29 GR

Medalists
gold medal	Chad le Clos	South Africa
silver medal	Joseph Schooling	Singapore
bronze medal	Adam Barrett	England

The men's 100 metre butterfly event at the 2014 Commonwealth Games as part of the swimming programme took place on 27 and 28 July at the Tollcross International Swimming Centre in Glasgow, Scotland.

The medals were presented by Bruce Robertson, Vice-President of the Commonwealth Games Federation and Swimming at the 1974 Commonwealth Games – Men's 100 metre butterfly|1974 Commonwealth bronze medallist in this event and the quaichs were presented by Paul Bush, Director of Commonwealth Games Scotland and former Chief Executive Officer of Scottish Swimming.

== Records ==
Prior to this competition, the existing world and Commonwealth Games records were as follows.

World record	Michael Phelps (USA)	49.82	Rome, Italy	1 August 2009
Commonwealth record	Jason Dunford (KEN)	50.78	Rome, Italy	31 July 2009
Games record	Geoff Huegill (AUS)	51.69	Delhi, India	8 October 2010

The following records were established during the competition:

Date	Event	Name	Nationality	Time	Record
24 July	Final	Chad le Clos	South Africa	51.29	GR

== Results ==
=== Heats ===
Rank	Heat	Lane	Name	Nationality	Time	Notes
1	5	4	Chad le Clos	South Africa	52.68	Q
2	5	5	Jayden Hadler	Australia	52.81	Q
3	4	4	Chris Wright	Australia	52.89	Q
4	4	3	Adam Barrett	England	53.13	Q
5	3	5	Jason Dunford	Kenya	53.27	Q
6	5	3	James Guy	England	53.28	Q
7	4	5	Tom Laxton	Wales	53.45	Q
8	3	4	Tommaso D'Orsogna	Australia	53.53	Q
=9	3	3	Joseph Schooling	Singapore	53.58	Q
=9	5	6	Coleman Allen	Canada	53.58	Q
11	4	6	Joseph Roebuck	England	53.67	Q
12	5	2	Evan White	Canada	53.98	Q
13	4	2	Grant Halsall	Isle of Man	54.00	Q
14	3	2	Dylan Carter	Trinidad and Tobago	54.21	Q
15	4	7	Quah Zheng Wen	Singapore	54.46	Q
16	3	6	Gamal Assaad	Canada	54.62	Q
17	5	7	Sajan Prakash	India	55.58	
18	5	1	Ifalemi Sau-Paea	Tonga	55.62	
19	4	1	Ralph Goveia	Zambia	56.33	
20	3	1	Thomas Hollingsworth	Guernsey	56.68	
21	3	7	Curtis Coulter	Northern Ireland	57.20	
22	2	4	Issa Mohamed	Kenya	58.05	
23	4	8	Mathieu Marquet	Mauritius	58.29	
24	2	5	Igor Mogne	Mozambique	58.56	
25	5	8	Cherantha de Silva	Sri Lanka	59.25	
26	2	3	Alex Bregazzi	Isle of Man	59.69	
27	3	8	James Sanderson	Gibraltar	1:00.65	
28	2	6	Stanford Kawale	Papua New Guinea	1:00.67	
29	2	2	Meli Malani	Fiji	1:00.91	
30	2	7	Adam Viktora	Seychelles	1:01.13	
31	1	4	Abeiku Jackson	Ghana	1:01.40	
32	2	1	Haris Bandey	Pakistan	1:04.37	
33	1	3	Collin Akara	Papua New Guinea	1:05.09	
34	1	6	Nishwan Ibrahim	Maldives	1:05.22	
35	1	2	Ammaar Ghadiyali	Tanzania	1:06.21	
36	1	5	Mohamed Adnan	Maldives	1:09.76	
37	1	7	Dillon Gooding	Saint Vincent and the Grenadines	1:11.86	
	2	8	Emidio Cuna	Mozambique		DNS

=== Semifinals ===
Rank	Heat	Lane	Name	Nationality	Time	Notes
1	1	5	Adam Barrett	England	52.00	Q
2	2	4	Chad le Clos	South Africa	52.12	Q
3	2	2	Joseph Schooling	Singapore	52.22	Q
4	2	5	Chris Wright	Australia	52.58	Q
5	1	6	Tommaso D'Orsogna	Australia	52.74	Q
6	1	3	James Guy	England	52.78	Q
7	2	3	Jason Dunford	Kenya	52.94	Q
8	1	4	Jayden Hadler	Australia	53.12	Q
9	2	6	Tom Laxton	Wales	53.14	
10	2	7	Joseph Roebuck	England	53.29	
11	1	7	Evan White	Canada	53.54	
12	1	2	Coleman Allen	Canada	53.63	
13	2	1	Grant Halsall	Isle of Man	54.15	
14	2	8	Quah Zheng Wen	Singapore	54.29	
15	1	8	Gamal Assaad	Canada	54.40	
16	1	1	Dylan Carter	Trinidad and Tobago	54.45	

=== Final ===
Rank	Lane	Name	Nationality	Time	Notes
1st place, gold medalist(s)	5	Chad le Clos	South Africa	51.29	GR
2nd place, silver medalist(s)	3	Joseph Schooling	Singapore	51.69	NR
3rd place, bronze medalist(s)	4	Adam Barrett	England	51.93	
4	8	Jayden Hadler	Australia	52.42	
5	2	Tommaso D'Orsogna	Australia	52.45	
6	7	James Guy	England	52.63	
7	1	Jason Dunford	Kenya	52.71	
8	6	Chris Wright	Australia	52.88	
