= Athletics at the 2014 Commonwealth Games – Men's discus throw (F42/44) =

The Men's discus throw F42/44 at the 2014 Commonwealth Games as part of the athletics programme was held at Hampden Park on 28 July 2014.

Rank	Athlete	Class	1	2	3	4	5	6	Best	Score	Notes
1st place, gold medalist(s)	Dan Greaves (ENG)	F44	48.65	54.94	59.21	x	56.82	x	59.21		
2nd place, silver medalist(s)	Aled Davies (WAL)	F42	44.77	46.83	45.88	43.54	45.31	45.55	46.83		
3rd place, bronze medalist(s)	Richard Okigbazi (NGR)	F42	33.48	39.38	36.43	38.98	38.89	38.32	39.28		PB
4	Jai Deep (IND)	F42	38.68	38.18	38.04	38.22	38.19	37.62	38.68		
5	Lean Simon (RSA)	F44	46.37	46.39	x	x	42.99	x	46.39		AR
6	Sunday Ezeh (NGR)	F44	x	44.04	44.89	41.76	36.62	41.43	44.89		PB
7	Paul Raison (AUS)	F44	44.44	x	42.01	44.19	x	44.35	44.44		
8	Don Elgin (AUS)	F44	34.40	37.37	37.72	37.66	37.05	x	37.72		PB
9	Wesly Gallath Arachchige (SRI)	F44	34.07	36.74	34.95				36.74		
10	Chandrasena Mapatunage (SRI)	F44	34.81	32.31	34.19				34.81		
11	Mario Arimond (MRI)	F42	23.59	23.95	24.85				24.85		PB
12	Etchegaray Nguluwe (NAM)	F44	24.64	28.88	28.16				28.88		PB
13	Martin Gereo (PNG)	F44	24.11	23.57	23.62				24.11		PB
14	Ismail Mugumya (UGA)	F	15.53	x	16.17				16.17		

WR World Record, GR Commonwealth Games Record, SB Season Best, PB Personal Best, DNS Did not start, DQ Disqualified, DNF Did not finish, AR Area Record
