= Gymnastics at the 2014 Commonwealth Games – Women's uneven bars =

Women's uneven bars at the 2014 Commonwealth Games
- Venue: SSE Hydro
- Dates: 31 July 2014
- Competitors: 8 from 5 nations
- Winning score: 14.666

Medalists
gold medal	Becky Downie	England
silver medal	Larissa Miller	Australia
bronze medal	Ruby Harrold	England

The women's individual uneven bars competition of the 2014 Commonwealth Games took place on July 31 at the SSE Hydro arena in Glasgow, Scotland.

== Results ==
=== Qualification ===
Qualification took place on July 28, as part of the team and individual qualification event.

=== Final ===
Position	Gymnast	D Score	E Score	Penalty	Total
1st place, gold medalist(s)	Becky Downie (ENG)	6.400	8.266		14.666
2nd place, silver medalist(s)	Larissa Miller (AUS)	6.100	8.466		14.566
3rd place, bronze medalist(s)	Ruby Harrold (ENG)	6.300	8.066		14.366
4	Ellie Black (CAN)	5.500	8.200		13.700
5	Georgia-Rose Brown (AUS)	5.700	7.866		13.566
6	Kirsten Beckett (RSA)	4.700	8.233		12.933
7	Elizabeth Beddoe (WAL)	5.300	6.333		11.633
8	Raer Theaker (WAL)	3.100	5.233		8.333
