= Gymnastics at the 2014 Commonwealth Games – Men's pommel horse =

Men's pommel horse at the 2014 Commonwealth Games
- Venue: SSE Hydro
- Dates: 31 July 2014
- Competitors: 8 from 5 nations
- Winning score: 16.058

Medalists
gold medal	Daniel Keatings	Scotland
silver medal	Max Whitlock	England
bronze medal	Louis Smith	England

The men's individual pommel horse exercise competition of the 2014 Commonwealth Games took place on July 31 at the SSE Hydro arena in Glasgow, Scotland.

== Results ==
=== Qualification ===
Qualification took place on July 28 as part of the team and individual qualification event.

=== Final ===
Position	Gymnast	D Score	E Score	Penalty	Total
1st place, gold medalist(s)	Daniel Keatings (SCO)	7.200	8.858		16.058
2nd place, silver medalist(s)	Max Whitlock (ENG)	7.400	8.566		15.966
3rd place, bronze medalist(s)	Louis Smith (ENG)	6.800	8.166		14.966
4	Jac Davies (WAL)	6.000	8.800		14.800
5	Daniel Purvis (SCO)	6.100	8.416		14.516
6	Zi Jie Gabriel Gan (SIN)	5.700	8.566		14.266
7	Anderson Loran (CAN)	5.800	7.800		13.600
8	Clinton Purnell (WAL)	4.800	8.166		12.966
