= Gymnastics at the 2014 Commonwealth Games – Men's artistic individual all-around =

Men's artistic individual all-around at the 2014 Commonwealth Games
- Venue: SSE Hydro
- Dates: 30 July 2014
- Competitors: 24 from 10 nations
- winning score: 90.631

Medalists
gold medal	Max Whitlock	England
silver medal	Daniel Keatings	Scotland
bronze medal	Nile Wilson	England

The Men's artistic individual all-around competition at the 2014 Commonwealth Games was held on 30 July at the SSE Hydro.

England's Max Whitlock won the gold medal with a total score of 90.631 points. Scotland's Daniel Keatings won silver with 88.298 points, while Nile Wilson, also from England, won bronze with 87.965 points. Whitlock led throughout the competition to win his first major all-around gold. Of his win, Whitlock said "It feel absolutely unbelievable. I've had goosebumps all over my body the whole competition and the atmosphere has been unbelievable an the support has been great but to finish on top of the podium is an amazing feeling."

== Final results ==
Position	Gymnast	Floor (gymnastics)	Pommel horse	Rings (gymnastics)	Vault (gymnastics)	Parallel bars	Horizontal bar	Total
Gold medal	Max Whitlock (ENG)	15.466	15.866	14.733	14.500	14.966	15.100	90.631
Silver medal	Daniel Keatings (SCO)	14.800	15.533	14.100	14.333	14.766	14.766	88.298
Bronze medal	Nile Wilson (ENG)	14.600	13.833	14.633	14.700	15.433	14.766	87.965
4	Daniel Purvis (SCO)	15.300	12.833	14.400	14.666	14.200	13.466	84.865
5	Naoya Tsukahara (AUS)	13.933	12.833	14.733	14.466	14.141	13.633	83.739
6	Frank Baines (SCO)	14.633	12.825	13.966	13.900	14.066	12.966	82.356
7	Clinton Purnell (WAL)	14.366	13.133	14.233	14.333	12.900	13.333	82.298
8	Mikhail Koudinov (NZL)	14.100	12.800	13.533	13.966	14.666	12.666	81.731
9	Luke Wadsworth (AUS)	13.900	12.233	13.733	14.300	13.800	13.666	81.632
10	Kristofer Done (NZL)	12.166	12.466	13.333	13.633	14.300	13.900	79.798
11	Sean O'Hara (AUS)	13.666	11.833	13.000	13.833	14.133	12.966	79.431
12	David Bishop (NZL)	12.833	12.666	12.566	14.125	13.400	13.666	79.256
13	Iwan Mepham (WAL)	12.033	12.133	13.466	13.500	13.666	12.833	77.631
14	Rakesh Patra (IND)	11.433	10.733	14.266	14.000	14.333	12.666	77.431
15	Panagiotis Aristotelous (CYP)	12.700	12.066	13.566	13.858	12.933	12.300	77.423
16	Tiaan Grobler (RSA)	13.066	12.400	13.766	13.366	12.433	12.333	77.364
17	Aditya Singh Rana (IND)	13.500	11.800	12.466	14.033	13.266	12.275	77.340
18	Ashish Kumar (IND)	13.650	12.533	12.100	13.333	12.133	13.333	77.082
19	Stefanos Loucaides (CYP)	12.833	11.433	12.966	13.166	13.566	12.733	76.697
20	Harry Owen (WAL)	13.300	12.700	12.900	13.300	12.966	11.275	76.441
21	Xenios Papaevripidou (CYP)	13.166	11.366	10.975	13.383	13.700	13.466	76.056
22	Siphesihle Biyase (RSA)	12.466	12.566	11.800	13.800	12.966	12.200	75.798
23	Zi Jie Gabriel Gan (SIN)	13.033	13.450	11.133	13.366	12.866	10.933	74.781
24	William Albert (TRI)	10.700	8.566	13.866	13.566	11.700	11.933	70.331
