= Daniel Awde =

British runner and former decathlete

Personal information
- Nationality: British
- Born: 22 June 1988 (age 38) Hammersmith, Greater London, England
- Height: 1.82 m (5 ft 11 1/2 in)
- Weight: 75 kg (165 lb)

Sport
- Event(s): Decathlon, 400 metres
- Club: Woodford Green with Essex Ladies
- Coached by: Chris Zah
Medal record
Commonwealth Games
Representing England
Gold medal – first place	2014 Glasgow	4 × 400 m relay

Daniel "Dan" Awde /ɔːd/ (born 22 June 1988 in Hammersmith, London) is a British 400 metres runner and former decathlete who has twice competed at the Summer Olympic Games.

In 2002 Awde, who competes for the Woodford Green with Essex Ladies athletics club, won the bronze medal in the under-15 event at the South of England Indoor Pentathlon competition. In 2007 he finished first in the junior event at the inaugural England Combined Events Championships.

He was selected to represent Great Britain at the 2008 Summer Olympics in Beijing after his training partner, former World Championship silver medallist Dean Macey, failed to achieve the qualifying standard. Macey subsequently retired from competition. Awde had achieved the decathlon 'B' qualifying standard of 7700 twice, first at the England Championships in Birmingham, where he improved his personal best by 416 points to 7704, then at the European Cup in Finland. Before going to Beijing he had what he described as an "inspirational" conversation with two-times Olympic decathlon champion Daley Thompson who is friends with Awde's coach Greg Richards.

In the decathlon competition at the 2008 Olympics, Awde finished 21st in the overall standings. The gold medal was won by American Bryan Clay. Awde set a new personal best in the pole vault at 4.90 m, the seventh best result for any athlete in the event. He had the fastest time of any athlete in the 400 metres, his time of 47.16 seconds earning him 950 points. Awde finished with 7516 points, 1275 behind Clay's winning total of 8791.

Awde missed the 2010 Commonwealth Games due to injury. He was selected to represent Great Britain in the 2012 Summer Olympics. In the first event (100 m sprint) Daniel won his heat with a personal best of 10.71 seconds but was then forced to withdraw from the competition with a knee injury during the long jump.

For the 2014 season Awde switched from the decathlon to the 400 metres, joining coach Chris Zah's training group based at Mile End, and winning a bronze at the UK Indoor Championships. He was subsequently selected for the England 4 × 400 m relay squad for the 2014 Commonwealth Games in Glasgow, which went on to win gold.

Awde has been in the filming industry to perform stunts in movies like Angel Has Fallen, Dolittle, F9, Hitman's Wife's Bodyguard, Black Widow, No Time to Die, The King's Man, and was the running body double for Chris Evans in Captain America: The First Avenger.
