= Karina Le Fevre =

English table tennis player (born 1993)

Personal information
- Nationality: England
- Born: 17 July 1993 (age 33) Stockton-on-Tees, England

Sport
- Club: Ormesby

Karina Le Fevre (born 17 July 1993) is a female international table tennis player from England.

== Table tennis career ==
She represented England at the 2010 World Table Tennis Championships and 2016 World Table Tennis Championships in the Corbillon Cup (women's team event).

She competed in the 2014 Commonwealth Games and plays for the Ormesby Club.

== See also ==
- List of England players at the World Team Table Tennis Championships
