= Adam Barrett (swimmer) =

British swimmer (born 1992)

Personal information
- Born: 30 July 1992 (age 33) Reading, Berkshire, England
- Height: 1.90 m (6 ft 3 in)
- Weight: 85 kg (187 lb)

Sport
- Sport: Swimming
Medal record
Representing Great Britain
European Championships (LC)
Gold medal – first place	2014 Berlin	4×100 m medley
Representing England
Commonwealth Games
Gold medal – first place	2014 Glasgow	4×100 m medley
Bronze medal – third place	2014 Glasgow	4×100 m freestyle
Bronze medal – third place	2014 Glasgow	100 m butterfly

Adam Barrett (born 30 July 1992) is an English butterfly and freestyle swimmer. In 2014, he swam the butterfly leg for the 4×100 m medley relay teams that won gold medals at the Commonwealth Games and European Championships.
