= Ruby Harrold =

British artistic gymnast

- Full name: Ruby Esther Harrold
- Born: 4 June 1996 (age 30) Stevenage, Hertfordshire, England
- Spouse: Spencer Hollander (m. 2025)

Gymnastics career
- Discipline: Women's artistic gymnastics
- Country represented: Great Britain England
- College team: LSU (2016–20)
- Club: The Academy
- Head coach: Liz Kincaid
- Assistant coach: Nia Edwards
- Music: My Number One by Elena Paparizou (2012–13)
- Retired: 2020
- World ranking: All Around 4 (2013–14) Bars 36 (2012)
Medal record
Representing Great Britain
World Championships
Bronze medal – third place	2015 Glasgow	Team
European Championships
Silver medal – second place	2014 Sofia	Team
Silver medal – second place	2016 Bern	Team
Representing England
Commonwealth Games
Gold medal – first place	2014 Glasgow	Team
Silver medal – second place	2014 Glasgow	All-around
Bronze medal – third place	2014 Glasgow	Uneven bars

Ruby Esther Harrold Hollander (née Harrold; born 4 June 1996) is a British artistic gymnast who was a member of the British Olympic team for the 2016 Summer Olympics in Rio de Janeiro, Brazil. Harrold was also a reserve athlete for the 2012 Summer Olympics team. She was a member of the British team that won the bronze medal in the team final at the 2015 World Artistic Gymnastics Championships. Following her retirement from elite gymnastics after the 2016 Summer Olympics, Harrold became a member of the LSU Tigers women's gymnastics team, having received a full athletic scholarship to attend Louisiana State University, beginning Fall of 2016.

== Gymnastics career ==
=== 2010 ===
In April, Harrold competed at the 2010 European Women's Artistic Gymnastics Championships in Birmingham, United Kingdom. She contributed an all-around score of 50.600 towards the British team's fifth-place finish.

In July, Harrold competed at the British Championships in Guildford, United Kingdom. She placed fourth in the all-around with a score of 52.800. In event finals, she placed first on vault, scoring 13.620, and seventh on floor, scoring 12.250.

=== 2011 ===
In May, Harrold participated in the British teams competition in Guildford, United Kingdom. She contributed an all-around score of 50.300 toward the academy's fifth-place finish.

In July, Harrold competed at the British Championships in Liverpool, United Kingdom. She placed second in the uneven bars final with a score of 13.250.

=== 2012 ===
In May, Harrold competed at the 2012 European Women's Artistic Gymnastics Championships in Brussels, Belgium as a replacement for her injured teammate Imogen Cairns. She contributed a vault score of 14.566 and an uneven bars score of 14.333 towards the British team's fourth-place finish. Harrold placed seventh in the uneven bars final with a score of 14.366. She said, "It was an amazing competition, a really good atmosphere and we competed really well as a team. We know each other really well having practiced side by side for weeks and it all went to plan."

At the end of June, Harrold competed at the British Championships in Liverpool, United Kingdom. This was the third and final Olympic Trial to decide the gymnasts that would represent the United Kingdom at the Olympics. She placed third in the uneven bars final with a score of 14.300.

=== 2013 ===
At the 2013 European Artistic Gymnastics Championships in Moscow, Russia, Harrold qualified to the individual all-around, uneven bars, and balance beam finals. In the all-around final, she finished 8th with a total score of 54.633, becoming the first British woman ever to produce a top-10 performance in an all-around European Championships final. In the balance beam final, she finished 6th after a solid performance which earned her a 13.633. She qualified 5th into the uneven bars final with a score of 14.133 but fell in the final, finishing 8th with a score of 12.900.

At the 2013 World Artistic Gymnastics Championships, Harrold finished 17th in the all-around and seventh in uneven bars.

=== 2014 ===
Harrold competed at the 2014 Commonwealth Games. She contributed an all-around score of 54.065 towards England's first-place finish. She finished second in the individual all-around with a score of 55.232. Harrold won bronze in the uneven bars final with a score of 14.366. Her teammate, Becky Downie, won gold.

==== World championships ====
In October, Harrold competed at the 2014 World Artistic Gymnastics Championships in Nanning, China, it was her second appearance at a World Championship event after first competing at the 2013 World Artistic Gymnastics Championships in Antwerp, Belgium. In qualification, Harrold contributed scores of 14.600 on vault, 14.733 on uneven bars, 13.700 on the balance beam and 13.733 on the floor for an all-around score of 56.766 and helping team Great Britain qualify in 4th place, a record breaking qualifying position for the team. Harrold, qualified in 9th place for the all-around competition and in 10th place for the uneven bars final. Due to the two-per-country rule, Tan Jiaxin of China, who qualified in 3rd place behind Yao Jinnan and Huang Huidan and Ekaterina Kramarenko of Russia, who also qualified in 9th place behind Aliya Mustafina and Daria Spiridonova, could not proceed to the finals.

In the team final, Harrold competed on three events, vault scoring 14.800, the uneven bars scoring 14.066 and the floor exercise scoring 13.700 contributing to Great Britain's team total of 168.495 and their 6th-place finish. In the All-Around final, Harrold finished in 11th place, improving on her 17th-place finish at the 2013 World Championships. She scored 14.683 on vault, 14.400 on the uneven bars, 13.066 on the balance beam and 13.466 on the floor exercise to finish with a total of 55.615, just behind teammate Claudia Fragapane in 10th place. Harrold also competed in her second World Championship uneven bars final after her first final in 2013. With an unfortunate fall during the middle of her routine, Harrold placed 8th with a score 13.666, behind her teammate Becky Downie, who finished in 5th place.

=== 2015 ===
In January, it was confirmed that Harrold would compete at the 2015 AT&T American Cup, her first appearance at the competition, alongside compatriot Claudia Fragapane. The event was set in Arlington, Texas on 7 March. However, by 20 January, due to a minor injury, Harrold pulled out of the American Cup and was replaced by Natsumi Sasada of Japan.

Harrold returned to competition at the British Team Championships, where she helped The Academy finish in third place, contributing a score of 14.000 on the vault, 13.850 on the balance beam and 12.500 on the floor exercise.

Later in that month, Harrold competed with Rebecca Tunney at the World Challenge Cup in Osijek, Croatia. She won a gold medal in the uneven bars final with a score of 14.125, 0.850 clear from silver medalist Annika Urvikko.

On 12 November 2015, she signed the National Letter of Intent to Louisiana State University.

=== 2016 ===
In July, Harrold was named to Great Britain's women's gymnastics team for the 2016 Summer Olympics in Rio de Janeiro, along with Becky Downie, Ellie Downie, Claudia Fragapane, and Amy Tinkler. The team finished in fifth place.

On 22 August 2016, Harold announced her retirement from the international gymnastic team, but would still compete at college level in the United States for Louisiana State University.
