= Adam Brown (swimmer) =

British swimmer

Personal information
- Full name: Adam Thorp Brown
- National team: Great Britain
- Born: 16 January 1989 (age 37) Cambridge, England
- Height: 1.96 m (6 ft 5 in)
- Weight: 95 kg (209 lb)

Sport
- Sport: Swimming
- Strokes: Freestyle
- Club: Hatfield Swimming Club
- College team: Auburn University
Medal record
Men's swimming
Representing England
Commonwealth Games
Gold medal – first place	2014 Glasgow	4x100 m medley relay
Silver medal – second place	2010 Delhi	4×100 m freestyle
Bronze medal – third place	2010 Delhi	4×100 m medley
Bronze medal – third place	2014 Glasgow	4x100 m freestyle relay

Adam Thorp Brown (born 16 January 1989) is an English competition swimmer who has represented Great Britain at the Olympics and FINA world championships, and England at the Commonwealth Games. Brown specialises in the 50-metre and 100-metre freestyle sprint swimming events.

He moved to Australia to the Gold Coast, Queensland to attend The Southport School in 2006, from which he graduated in December 2007. Brown accepted an athletic scholarship to attend Auburn University in Auburn, Alabama, where he swam for coach Brett Hawke's Auburn Tigers swimming and diving team in National Collegiate Athletic Association (NCAA) and Southeastern Conference (SEC) competition from 2008 to 2011.

He has been a part of the British senior national team since 2008 where he represented Great Britain at the 2008 Summer Olympics in the 4×100-metre freestyle relay. He also represented Great Britain at the 2009 World Championships in Rome, Italy. He was a part of the English team at the 2010 Commonwealth Games in Delhi, India. He swam for Great Britain at the 2011 World Championships in Shanghai, China. The following year he got to represent Great Britain at the 2012 Olympic Games in London. In 2013 he went on to compete at the 2013 World Championships in Barcelona.

At the 2014 Commonwealth Games, he was part of the England team that won a gold in the 4 x 100 m medley relay in a new Games record, and bronze in the 4 x 100 m freestyle relay.

== Results ==
- 2008-Beijing Olympic Games-4 × 100 m Freestyle Relay-8th Place
- 2009-Rome World Championships-50m Freestyle-40th
- 2009-Rome World Championships-100m Freestyle-28th
- 2009-Rome World Championships-4 × 100 m Freestyle Relay-7th
- 2010-Delhi Commonwealth Games-50m Freestyle-6th
- 2010-Delhi Commonwealth Games-100m Freestyle-8th
- 2010-Delhi Commonwealth Games-4 × 100 m Freestyle Relay-SILVER MEDAL
- 2010-Delhi Commonwealth Games-4 × 100 m Medley Relay (heats only)-BRONZE MEDAL
- 2011-Shanghai World Championships-50m Freestyle-13th
- 2011-Shanghai World Championships-100m Freestyle-21st
- 2011-Shanghai World Championships-4 × 100 m Freestyle Relay-8th
- 2011-Shanghai World Championships-4 × 100 m Medley Relay-6th
- 2012-London Olympic Games-50m Freestyle-20th
- 2012-London Olympic Games-100m Freestyle-20th
- 2012-London Olympic Games-4 × 100 m Medley Relay-4th
- 2013-Barcelona World Championships-50m Freestyle-17th
- 2013-Barcelona World Championships-100m Freestyle-9th
- 2013-Barcelona World Championships-4 × 100 m Medley Relay-9th

== Best Times ==
Event	Time (LCM)	Time (SCM)	Time (SCY)
50 Freestyle	21.92	21.37	18.72
100 Freestyle	48.48	46.75	41.75
50 Butterfly	23.96	25.33	-
100 Butterfly	54.94	53.33	46.17
