= James Disney-May =

British swimmer (born 1992)

Personal information
- Full name: James Disney-May
- National team: Great Britain
- Born: 4 August 1992 (age 34) Chertsey, England
- Height: 1.92 m (6 ft 4 in)
- Weight: 78 kg (172 lb; 12.3 st)

Sport
- Sport: Swimming
- Strokes: Freestyle
- College team: Auburn University

James Disney-May (born 4 August 1992) is an English competitive swimmer.

He has represented Great Britain in the Olympic Games, and competed for England in the Commonwealth Games. At the 2012 Summer Olympics in London, he swam for the British team in the men's 4×100-metre freestyle relay.

== Personal life ==
Disney-May attended Millfield School from 2005 to 2010.

James Disney-May represented Great Britain at the 2012 London Olympics, competing in the 4x100m freestyle relay and contributing to a 12th-place finish in the preliminary rounds. His collegiate swimming career at Auburn University included two NCAA championships, 12 All-American honors, and seven SEC titles in both individual and relay events. He also received All-SEC First Team honors in 2012 and 2013, along with inclusion in the SEC Academic Honor Roll.

During his senior season (2013-14), he competed in six events at the NCAA Championships, where he earned his second national title as part of the 400 freestyle relay team. He also contributed to Auburn’s school record in the 800 freestyle relay, while securing NCAA automatic qualifying times in the 50 free, 100 free, and 100 backstroke. His collegiate record includes multiple relay and individual achievements, placing him among Auburn’s top-ten performers in the 200 freestyle and 100 backstroke.

In December 2022 Disney-May was sentenced to 21 months in jail spending 6 months in remand with 18 months suspended after pleading guilty to domestic assault against his fiancé. He was also told to attend counseling sessions, be electronically tracked for four months and had a four year restraining order banning him from contacting his partner and her parents.
