= Viktor Bankin =

Ukrainian sport shooter (born 1990)

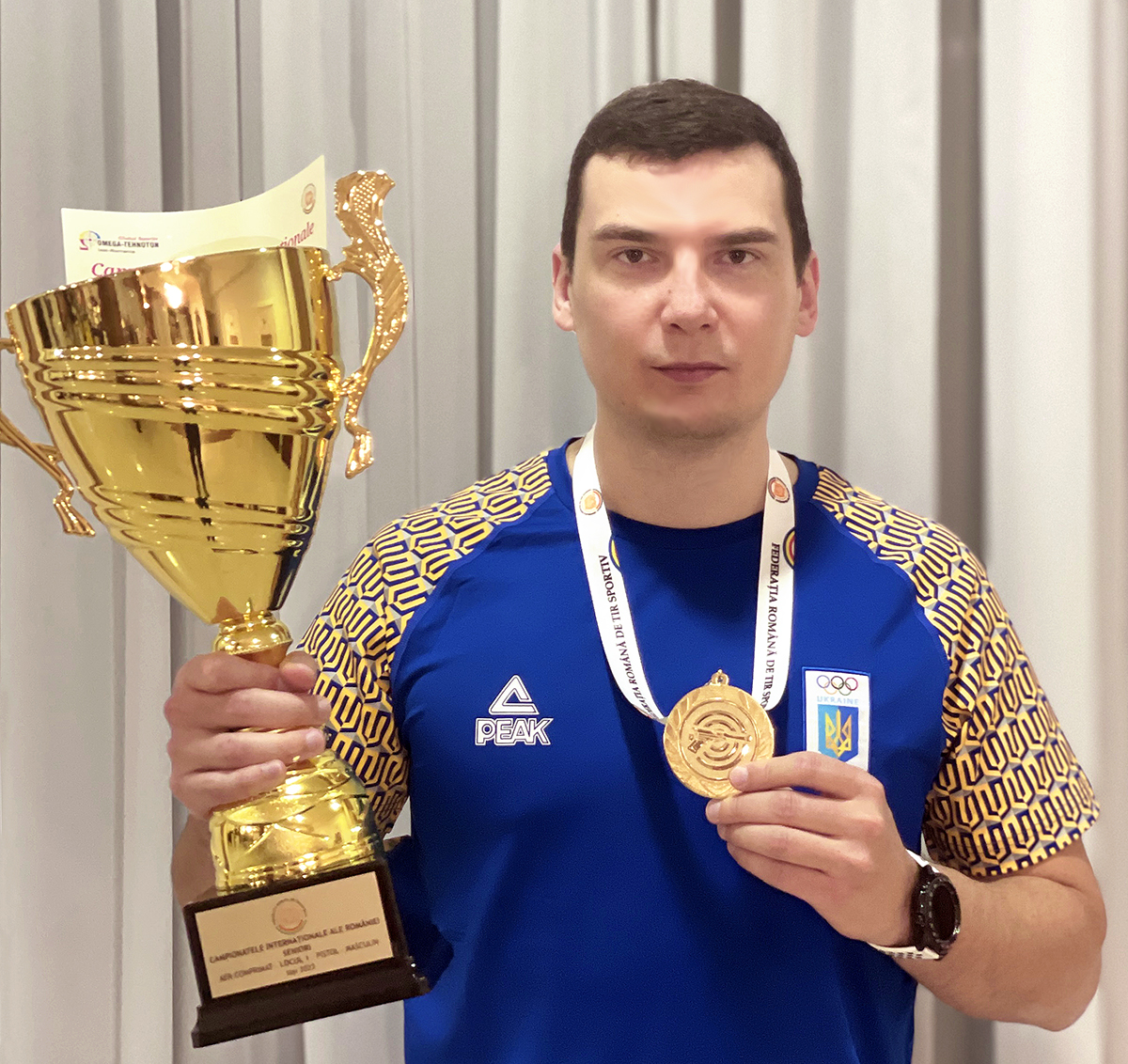

Personal information
- Full name: Viktor Viktorovych Bankin
- Nationality: Ukraine
- Born: 24 August 1990 (age 35) Kyiv, Ukraine
- Height: 1.85 m (6 ft 1 in)
- Weight: 84 kg (185 lb)

Sport
- Country: Ukraine
- Sport: Shooting
- Event(s): AP60, APM, FP, APMIX, APTEAMM
- Club: Armed Forces of Ukraine
- Coached by: Zinovii Grinberg; Volodymyr Ivanchuk
Medal record
Men's shooting
Representing Ukraine
Event	1st	2nd	3rd
World Championships	0	0	1
European Championships	3	3	4
ISSF Grand Prix	1	1	0
World Championships
Bronze medal – third place	2022 Cairo	50 m pistol
Bronze medal – third place	2025 Cairo	50 m meter pistol team
European Championships
Gold medal – first place	2014 Moskow	10 m air pistol team
Gold medal – first place	2018 Gyor	10 m air pistol team
Gold medal – first place	2019 Bologna	50 m pistol team
Gold medal – first place	2025 Châteauroux	50 m Pistol Team
Silver medal – second place	2017 Baku	50 m pistol team
Silver medal – second place	2017 Maribor	10 m air pistol team
Silver medal – second place	2024 Győr	10 m air pistol team
Bronze medal – third place	2013 Osijek	10 m air pistol team
Bronze medal – third place	2019 Bologna	50 m pistol
Bronze medal – third place	2021 Osijek	50 m pistol open event
Bronze medal – third place	2023 Tallinn	10 m air pistol team
Bronze medal – third place	2025 Osijek	10 m air pistol team
Bronze medal – third place	2025 Châteauroux	50 m Pistol

Viktor Bankin (Ukrainian: Віктор Вікторович Банькін; born 24 August 1990 in Kyiv, Ukraine) is a Ukrainian sport shooter, Master of Sports of Ukraine, World Class.

== Career ==
He started shooting at the age of 10, and from the age of 12 he began to participate in competitions. Studied at the Kyiv City School of Higher Sports Mastery.

Since 2009, he has been serving in the Armed Forces of Ukraine, an athlete-instructor of the Central Sports Club of the AFU, a member of the Ukrainian army shooting team.

In 2010, as part of the team, he set a Ukrainian record among juniors in the 10 meter air pistol (1735 points).

Bankin is a three-time champion of the European Championship (2014, 2018 and 2019).

In 2022, Viktor Bankin became World Championships bronze medalist in the 50 meters pistol event.

Member of the Ukrainian Shooting Federation and the National Shot Shooting Team of Ukraine.

== Awards ==
- Prize of the Cabinet of Ministers of Ukraine for Special Achievements of Youth in the Development of Ukraine (2015).
