= 2025 King's Prize =

2025 edition of the Sovereign's Prize

King's Prize at the 2025 Imperial Meeting
- Venue: National Shooting Centre
- Location: Bisley, United Kingdom
- Dates: 23 – 26 July
- Competitors: 800
- Total prize money: £250

The 2025 King's Prize is a major fullbore target rifle competition which took place at the National Shooting Centre in Bisley, Surrey from 23 July to 26 July. It was the 156th edition of the Sovereign's Prize and was the final event of the 2025 Imperial Meeting.

== Stage I ==
The first stage of the competition, consisting of 3 shoots of 7 shots to count at 300, 500 and 600 yards, was won by English rifleman Glyn Barnett with a score of 105.20v out of a possible 105.21v. TJ Bourne came second and ANR Walker came third, both with a score of 105.19v. The top 300 competitors proceed to Stage II.
