= 2010 in shooting =

This article lists the main target shooting events and their results for 2010.

== World Events ==
=== International Shooting Sport Federation ===
==== ISSF World Shooting Championships ====
- July 29 - August 10: 2010 ISSF World Shooting Championships held in Munich, Germany.

==== ISSF World Cup ====
- 2010 ISSF World Cup

=== FITASC ===
2010 Results

=== 2010 Summer Youth Olympics ===
- August 22-25: Shooting at the 2010 Summer Youth Olympics held at the Singapore Sports School.

=== Commonwealth Games ===
- October 9-13: Shooting at the 2010 Commonwealth Games held at the Dr. Karni Singh Shooting Range in Delhi, India
- February 19-27: 2010 Commonwealth Shooting Championships served as the test event for the Commonwealth Games later in the year

== Regional Events ==
=== Americas ===
==== Central American and Caribbean Games ====
- July 18-25: Shooting at the 2010 Central American and Caribbean Games held in Mayaguez, Puerto Rico.

==== Shooting Championships of the Americas ====
- 2010 Shooting Championships of the Americas, Rio de Janeiro, Brazil

==== South American Games ====
- March 20-26: Shooting at the 2010 South American Games

=== Asia ===
==== Asian Shooting Championships ====
- March 27 - April 6: 2010 Asian Clay Shooting Championships held in Bangkok, Thailand

==== Asian Games ====
- November 13-24: Shooting at the 2010 Asian Games held in Guangzhou, China.

=== Europe ===
==== European Shooting Confederation ====
- March 6-14: 2010 European 10 m Events Championships held in Meråker, Norway.
- 2010 European Shotgun Championships held in Kazan, Russia.

== National Events ==
=== United Kingdom ===
==== NRA Imperial Meeting ====
- July, held at the National Shooting Centre, Bisley
  - Queen's Prize winner: David Calvert (NIR)
  - Grand Aggregate winner: DC Luckman
  - Ashburton Shield winners: Epsom College
  - Kolapore Winners: Great Britain (GBR)
  - National Trophy Winners: Scotland (SCO)
  - Elcho Shield winners: England (ENG)
  - Vizianagram winners: House of Commons

==== NSRA National Meeting ====
- August, held at the National Shooting Centre, Bisley
  - Earl Roberts British Prone Champion: Michelle Smith (GBR)

=== USA ===
- 2010 NCAA Rifle Championships, won by Alaska Nanooks
