= 2019 in shooting =

This article lists the main target shooting events and their results for 2019.

== World Events ==
=== International Shooting Sport Federation ===
==== ISSF World Cup ====
- 2019 ISSF World Cup
- 2019 ISSF Junior World Cup

=== International Confederation of Fullbore Rifle Associations ===
2019 ICFRA World Long Range Championships - Seddon Range, Trentham, New Zealand
Event	Gold	Silver	Bronze
Palma Trophy	Australia	Great Britain	United States
Individual	S Negus (AUS)	M Bailey (AUS)	DC Luckman (GBR)
Under-21 Champion	L Rettmer (USA)		
Under-25 Champion	C Schwebel (AUS)		
Veterans Champion	M Buchanan (AUS)		
Super-Veterans Champion	J Rhynard (USA)		

=== International Practical Shooting Confederation ===
- August 3-10: 2019 IPSC Rifle World Shoot in Karlskoga, Sweden

=== FITASC ===
2019 Results

=== Island Games ===
- July: Shooting at the 2019 Island Games in Gibraltar

=== Military World Games ===
- October 19-25: Shooting at the 2019 Military World Games in Wuhan, China

=== Summer Universiade ===
- July 4-9: Shooting at the 2019 Summer Universiade in Naples, Italy

== Regional Events ==
=== Africa ===
==== African Games ====
- August 25-30: Shooting at the 2019 African Games in Morocco

==== African Shooting Championships ====
- November 17-25: 2019 African Shooting Championships in Tipasa, Algeria

=== Americas ===
==== Pan American Games ====
- August 8-10: Shooting at the 2019 Pan American Games in Lima, Peru

==== Parapan American Games ====
- Shooting at the 2019 Parapan American Games in Lima, Peru

=== Asia ===
==== Asian Shooting Championships ====
- March 25-April 2: 2019 Asian Airgun Championships in Taiwan
- November 5-13: 2019 Asian Shooting Championships in Qatar
- September 20-30: 2019 Asian Shotgun Championships in Kazakhstan

==== Oceania Shooting Championships ====
- November 2-8: 2019 Oceania Shooting Championships in Australia

==== Pacific Games ====
- July 15-19: Shooting at the 2019 Pacific Games in Samoa

==== Southeast Asian Games ====
- December 2-10: Shooting at the 2019 Southeast Asian Games in Lubao, Philippines

=== Europe ===
==== European Games ====
- June 22-28: Shooting at the 2019 European Games in Minsk, Belarus

==== European Shooting Confederation ====
- March 17-24: 2019 European 10 m Events Championships in Osijek, Croatia
- September 12-23: 2019 European Shooting Championships in Bologna & Tolmezzo, Italy
- September 3-17: 2019 European Shotgun Championships in Lonato del Garda, Italy
- July 8-15: 2019 European Running Target Championships in Gyenesdiás, Hungary

==== "B Matches" ====
- September 14-15: first AirOShoot Super Final held in Herent, Belgium
- January 31 - February 2: InterShoot in Den Haag, Netherlands
- December 11-14: RIAC held in Strassen, Luxembourg

== National Events ==
=== United Kingdom ===
==== NRA Imperial Meeting ====
- July, held at the National Shooting Centre, Bisley
  - Queen's Prize winner: GCD Barnett (GBR)
  - Grand Aggregate winner: ANR Walker
  - Ashburton Shield winners: Royal Grammar School, Guildford
  - Kolapore Winners: Great Britain (GBR)
  - National Trophy Winners: England (ENG)
  - Elcho Shield winners: England (ENG)
  - Vizianagram winners: House of Lords

==== NSRA National Meeting ====
- August, held at the National Shooting Centre, Bisley
  - Earl Roberts British Prone Champion: Theo Dodds (GBR)

=== USA ===
- 2019 NCAA Rifle Championships, won by TCU Horned Frogs
