= 2018 in shooting =

This article lists the main target shooting events and their results for 2018.

== World Events ==
=== International Shooting Sport Federation ===
==== ISSF World Shooting Championships ====
- September 2 - 14: 2018 ISSF World Shooting Championships held in Changwon, South Korea.

==== ISSF World Cup ====
- 2018 ISSF World Cup
- 2018 ISSF Junior World Cup

=== International Practical Shooting Confederation ===
- 2018 IPSC Action Air World Shoot
- 2018 IPSC Shotgun World Shoot

=== FITASC ===
2018 Results

=== Commonwealth Games ===
- April 8 - 14: Shooting at the 2018 Commonwealth Games, Gold Coast, Australia

== Regional Events ==
=== Americas ===
==== Shooting Championships of the Americas ====
- November 3 - 10: 2018 Shooting Championships of the Americas, Guadalajara, Mexico

=== Asia ===
==== Asian Shooting Championships ====
- November 2 - 12: 2018 Asian Airgun Championships
- November 2 - 12: 2018 Asian Shotgun Championships

==== Asian Games ====
- August 19 - 28: Shooting at the 2018 Asian Games

=== Europe ===
==== European 10metre Event Championships ====
- February 16 - 26: 2018 European 10 m Events Championships held in Győr, Hungary.
- 10m Men's Air Rifle
  - (gold) : Vladimir Maslennikov (RUS)
  - (silver) : Alexander Dryagin (RUS)
  - (bronze) : Petar Gorša (CRO)
- 10m Women's Air Rifle
  - (gold) : Stine Nielsen (DEN)
  - (silver) : Katarzyna Komorowska (POL)
  - (bronze) : Manon Smeets (NED)
- 10m Men's Air Pistol
  - (gold) : Yusuf Dikeç (TUR)
  - (silver) : Artem Chernousov (RUS)
  - (bronze) : João Costa (POR)
- 10m Women's Air Pistol
  - (gold) : Céline Goberville (FRA)
  - (silver) : Zorana Arunović (SRB)
  - (bronze) : Bobana Veličković Momčilović (SRB)

==== European Shotgun Championships ====
- July 30 - August 13: 2018 European Shotgun Championships

==== Mediterranean Games ====
- June 23 - 24: Shooting at the 2018 Mediterranean Games

==== "B Matches" ====
- February 1-4: InterShoot in Den Haag, Netherlands
- December 12-15: RIAC held in Strassen, Luxembourg

== National Events ==
=== United Kingdom ===
==== NRA Imperial Meeting ====
- July, held at the National Shooting Centre, Bisley
  - Queen's Prize winner: David Luckman (GBR)
  - Grand Aggregate winner: J Corbett
  - Ashburton Shield winners: Sedbergh School
  - Kolapore Winners: Great Britain (GBR)
  - National Trophy Winners: England (ENG)
  - Elcho Shield winners: England (ENG)
  - Vizianagram winners: House of Commons

==== NSRA National Meeting ====
- August, held at the National Shooting Centre, Bisley
  - Earl Roberts British Prone Champion: Jonathan Andrews (GBR)

=== USA ===
- 2018 NCAA Rifle Championships, won by Kentucky Wildcats
