= 2014 in shooting =

This article lists the main target shooting events and their results for 2014.

== World Events ==
=== International Shooting Sport Federation ===
==== ISSF World Shooting Championships ====
- September 6-20: 2014 ISSF World Shooting Championships held in Granada, Spain.

==== ISSF World Cup ====
- 2014 ISSF World Cup

=== World Shooting Para Sport Championships ===
- July 18-26: 2014 IPC Shooting World Championships held in Suhl, Germany

=== International Practical Shooting Confederation ===
- 2014 IPSC Handgun World Shoot

=== FITASC ===
2014 Results

=== 2014 Summer Youth Olympics ===
- August 17-22: Shooting at the 2014 Summer Youth Olympics, held in Nanjing, China

=== Commonwealth Games ===
- July 25-29: Shooting at the 2014 Commonwealth Games, Barry Buddon, Scotland

== Regional Events ==
=== Americas ===
==== Central American & Caribbean Games ====
- November 15-24: Shooting at the 2014 Central American and Caribbean Games held in Veracruz, Mexico

==== Shooting Championships of the Americas ====
- 2014 Shooting Championships of the Americas

==== South American Games ====
- Shooting at the 2014 South American Games held in Viña del Mar, Chile

=== Asia ===
==== Asian Shooting Championships ====
- March 7-13: 2014 Asian Airgun Championships
- November 1-10: 2014 Asian Shotgun Championships

==== Asian Games ====
- September 20-30: Shooting at the 2014 Asian Games

=== Europe ===
==== European Shooting Confederation ====
- February 26 - March 3: 2014 European 10 m Events Championships held in Moscow, Russia.
- June 16-27: 2014 European Shotgun Championships held in Sarlóspuszta, Hungary

==== "B Matches" ====
- February 6-8: InterShoot in Den Haag, Netherlands
- RIAC held in Strassen, Luxembourg

== National Events ==
=== United Kingdom ===
==== NRA Imperial Meeting ====
- July, held at the National Shooting Centre, Bisley
  - Queen's Prize winner: RCT Jeens (GBR)
  - Grand Aggregate winner: PG Kent
  - Ashburton Shield winners: Wellington College
  - Kolapore Winners: Great Britain (GBR)
  - National Trophy Winners: England (ENG)
  - Elcho Shield winners: England (ENG)
  - Vizianagram winners: House of Lords

==== NSRA National Meeting ====
- August, held at the National Shooting Centre, Bisley
  - Earl Roberts British Prone Champion: Ken Bowley (GBR)

=== USA ===
- 2014 NCAA Rifle Championships, won by West Virginia Mountaineers
