= 2022 in shooting =

This article lists the main target shooting events and their results for 2022.

== World Events ==
=== International Shooting Sport Federation ===
==== ISSF World Shooting Championships ====
- October 12-27: 2022 ISSF World Shooting Championships held in Egypt.
- September 19 - October 12: 2022 World Shotgun Championships held in Osijek, Croatia
- August 2-9: 2022 World Running Target Championships held at the Centre National de Tir in Châteauroux, France

==== ISSF World Cup ====
- 2022 ISSF World Cup

=== World Shooting Para Sport Championships ===
- November 6-17: 2022 World Shooting Para Sport Championships held in Al Ain, United Arab Emirates

=== International Practical Shooting Confederation ===
- November 27 - December 3: 2022 IPSC Handgun World Shoot held in Pattaya, Thailand,

=== FITASC ===
- 2022 Results

=== 2021 Islamic Solidarity Games ===
- August 10-15: Shooting at the 2021 Islamic Solidarity Games held in Konya, Turkey. This event was postponed from 2021 due to COVID-19.

== Regional Events ==
=== Americas ===
==== Bolivarian Games ====
- June 27 - July 3: Shooting at the 2022 Bolivarian Games held in Valledupar, Colombia

==== South American Games ====
- October 9-14: Shooting at the 2022 South American Games held in Asunción, Paraguay.

=== Asia ===
==== Asian Shooting Championships ====
- November 9 - 19: 2022 Asian Airgun Championships held in Daegu, South Korea

==== Southeast Asian Games ====
- May 16-22: Shooting at the 2021 Southeast Asian Games held in Hanoi, Vietnam

=== Europe ===
==== European Shooting Confederation ====
- March 18-27: 2022 European 10 m Events Championships held in Hamar, Norway.
- July 25-30: 2022 European 300 m Rifle Championships in Zagreb, Croatia.
- August 24 - September 12: 2022 European Shotgun Championships in Larnaca, Cyprus.
- September 5-8: 2022 European 25/50 m Events Championships held in Wrocław, Poland.

==== Mediterranean Games ====
- June 28 - July 3: Shooting at the 2022 Mediterranean Games held in Hassi Ben Okba, Algeria

==== "B Matches" ====
- December 8-12: RIAC held in Strassen, Luxembourg

== National Events ==
=== United Kingdom ===
==== NRA Imperial Meeting ====
- July, held at the National Shooting Centre, Bisley
  - Queen's Prize winner: Alice Good (GBR)
  - Grand Aggregate winner: Parag Patel (GBR)
  - Ashburton Shield winners: Bradfield College
  - Kolapore Winners: Great Britain (GBR)
  - National Trophy Winners: England (ENG)
  - Vizianagram winners: House of Commons

==== NSRA National Meeting ====
- August, held at the National Shooting Centre, Bisley
  - Earl Roberts British Prone Champion: Lina Jones (GBR)

=== USA ===
- 2022 NCAA Rifle Championships, won by Kentucky Wildcats
