= Allhallows College =

Location
- Rousdon; Lyme Regis, Devon, DT7 3RA; England
- Coordinates: 50°43′34″N 2°56′13″W

Information
- Type: Public school Private day and boarding school
- Established: c. 1515
- Closed: 1998
- Headmaster: Keith Moore
- Gender: Mixed
- Age: 11 to 18
- Former pupils: Old Honitonians

Allhallows College, previously known as Allhallows School, was a British public school for boys in Devon, in the west of England. Predominantly a boarding school, but with some day boys, it was founded in Honiton about 1515, moved to a new home at Rousdon in the 1930s, and was closed in 1998, after a fall in the number of boys had led to a financial crisis.

Although Lyme Regis is in Dorset, the new school site was over the county boundary in Devon. However, the postal address was "Near Lyme Regis, Dorset", which has led to confusion.

== History ==
The school was founded about 1515 in Honiton, probably as a chantry school where priests taught boys to read Latin so that they could sing in the choir. Later still it became a grammar school for the sons of the local gentry. Its origins in Honiton are the reason former pupils are still known as Old Honitonians, or OHs. The school was named after its neighbour All Hallows, a roadside chapel for travellers built sometime before 1327 and now the oldest existing secular building in Honiton.

By the 1930s there was an increase in traffic through Honiton, which lay on the main route to Cornwall, which became a serious hazard to the school, with premises on both sides of the main road. The headmaster of the day, George Shallow, found a new site in the shape of a large Victorian country house with over 350 acres of land on the coast at Rousdon, a few miles to the West of Lyme Regis. This stood on the cliffs of what was later called the Jurassic Coast, now a World Heritage Site. The house had been built in the 1870s for Sir Henry Peek, 1st Baronet, by the architect Sir Ernest George, who also built Southwark Bridge in London. (Among Sir Ernest's pupils was the even more famous architect Sir Edwin Lutyens). In 1870, Sir Henry purchased the village of Rousdon, rebuilt the church and built the village school. He then commissioned Ernest George to design a mansion to take advantage of the superb position 152.4m/500 feet above the sea. Being a distance from the nearest town, the house had to be self-sufficient with laundry, coach houses, harness rooms, wine cellars, bowling alley, rifle range, china stores, bake houses, larders, museum, observatory, walled garden, tennis courts, farm buildings and numerous cottages to house the estate population, which at the end of the 19th Century extended to about 600.

Sir Henry Peek was a governor of Holloway prison, and many of the floors were inlaid with mosaics created by the inmates. Sir Henry's famous collection of stuffed birds reputedly had an example of every bird to have landed on the British Isles. The building was a few hundred yards from the cliff-edge overlooking the massive landslip from 1839 and had extensive grounds, even if the location was remote. Inevitably not all the necessary facilities were there and though improvement work started this was brought to a halt by the Second World War. The school was not to acquire a proper gymnasium, swimming pool or cricket pavilion until some years after the war.

In the two decades after the Second World War the school gained a national reputation in shooting, attending Bisley on a regular basis and winning the inter-schools Ashburton Shield several times. This was thanks to the work of James Turner who had been a pupil at the school and then after university joined the staff as chemistry master. During the war he had worked on ballistics and he used this knowledge to train a series of first-class shots. He stayed with the school all his life, ending up with a short spell in the headmaster's chair, and then in retirement raising funds. He was one of several masters who devoted their lives to the school including G. S. Napier ('Nap') who spent over a hundred terms there after the First World War.

Around 1970 the school became one of the first public schools to admit girls and it prospered into the 1980s. However, in the 1990s it went into a decline, with the number of pupils decreasing significantly, from almost 300 to fewer than half that number. One reason for this may have been the school's remote location, at a time when parents expected to see a lot more of their children than had been traditional in the old public school era.

== Closure ==
The school ran into financial difficulty in 1994. A group of Old Honitonians put together a plan and secured some financial backing to attempt a rescue. A new entity, Allhallows College, was established as a company limited by guarantee and registered as a charity. The recession of the early 1990s proved severe, and several West Country schools were closed; the same fate befell Allhallows College despite the efforts of staff and the board of directors. The college was closed at the end of Autumn term 1998. There is continuing controversy among Old Honitonians as to whether the closure was the best decision for the school or necessary.

== Notable former pupils ==
- Lieutenant Colonel Sir Guy Acland, Army officer
- Battiscombe Gunn, Egyptologist
- Marshal of the RAF Sir Arthur Harris, 'Bomber' Harris of the Second World War
- David Holmes, BBC reporter
- Darryl Hunt, musician, member of The Pogues
- Sir John Lister-Kaye, 8th Bt., OBE, naturalist, writer, lecturer, founder of Aigas Field Centre
- Sidney Olivier. cricketer and Royal Navy officer
- Nicholas Pennell, actor
- Ernest Smythe, cricketer and Indian Army officer
- General Sir Walter Venning, former Quartermaster-General to the Forces
- Sir Richard van der Riet Woolley, Astronomer Royal
- Mark Lui (Chinese: 雷頌德), composer and producer of Cantopop music in Hong Kong
- Tim Dutton, Actor
- Major General James Chiswell, CB, CBE, MC, British Army Officer
- General Sir Roger Neil Wheeler, GCB, CBE, British Army Officer

== Sources ==
- Design Brief for the breakup of the Rousdon Estate
- Education: School League Tables for 1998
- Old Honitonians website
- Video
- Peek Devon Estates
- Allhallows Museum, Honiton
