= Gallery Rifle Shooting =

Gallery rifle shooting
- Highest governing body: International Gallery Rifle Federation (IGRF)

Presence
- Olympic: No
- Paralympic: No

Gallery rifle shooting or gallery rifle and pistol shooting is a popular shooting sport throughout the world. In countries such as the UK, Ireland, Germany, South Africa and Australia national and international competitions are regularly undertaken. The discipline commonly uses rifles shot at short and medium distances chambered for traditional pistol calibers such as .22 Long Rifle, .38 and .357 calibers, .44 and .45. It is popular in countries where traditional pistol shooting is difficult or not possible. In the UK Long Barreled Pistols (LBPs) and Long Barreled Revolvers (LBRs) are also part of the overall discipline.

Country specific national governing bodies (NGBs) are responsible for the discipline within that country. The International gallery rifle Federation (IGRF) promotes the development of gallery rifle competitive shooting worldwide, supervises international matches and supports a common set of rules. Individual member countries who have an interest in International gallery rifle shooting are free to join the IGRF. It currently has five member countries.

== Description ==
Most gallery rifle events are shot at distances between 10 meters and 50 meters although a few do go out to 300 meters. There is a large selection of gallery rifle events which only require range space out to 25 meters so the discipline is easily accessible and can be shot on indoor ranges. The most common shooting position is standing unsupported but some events do test the competitor's skills from other positions such as kneeling, sitting or from the weak shoulder or hand. Some competitions are deliberate precision events whilst others require the competitor to shoot and reload quite quickly. The targets can be stationary or turning at set intervals. Some targets are moving and reactive (e.g. steel plates).

Classification rules allow rifles to be fitted with either iron sights, scopes or red dot sights. Targets vary according to the event being shot. Targets range from traditional concentric circle 'bullseye' targets to various styles of disruptive pattern designs. Targets may be fixed facing the shooters or set on turning target mechanisms which are requires for rapid and snap shooting events.

Many events are also shot in classes or divisions which allow people to compete equally among their peers. The classification system is administered by the country specific NGBs.

== Governance and rules ==
The National Rifle Association is the governing body for gallery rifle Shooting in the UK and produces a rulebook which is generally adopted as the standard throughout the world. Other NGBs will inherit and modify as appropriate for local use. For other IGRF member nations governance is managed as follows:

- Ireland – National Association of Sporting Rifle and Pistol Clubs (NASRPC)
- Germany – Bund der Militär- und Polizeischützen e.V (BDMP)
- South Africa – South African Hunters and Game Conservation Association (SA Hunters)
- Australia – Sporting Shooters Association of Australia (SSAA)

== Equipment ==
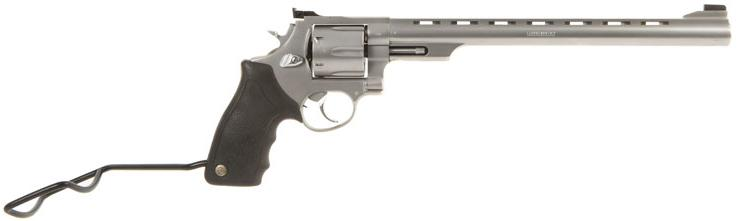
Long barrelled firearms are unique to the UK and are manufactured to comply with firearms legislation. Long barrelled revolvers are part of the gallery rifle and pistol discipline and compete in their own class.

There are four main categories:

- Gallery Rifle Small Bore (GRSB). Most competitors use a semi automatic (self loading) rifle chambered in .22 Long Rifle. In some events, however, it is possible to use pump action, lever action, bolt action or even single shot rifles.
- Gallery Rifle Centre Fire (GRCF). Most shooters use a lever action rifle in a traditional pistol caliber. Examples of the most popular calibers are .38/.357, .44 or .45 Other types of rifle, such as the AR15 in 9mm, with lever release cocking, are gaining popularity.
- Long Barrelled Revolver (LBR) With a minimum overall length of 60 cm and a minimum barrel length of 30 cm these pistol carbines are manufactured to comply with UK firearms regulations. The revolvers are available in a variety of calibers. Most popular are .38/.357 and .44 although some competitors do use the .45 ACP.
- Long Barrelled Pistols (LBP) The LBPs are generally semi automatic, although single shot designs are available and are sometimes used for precision events. Like the LBRs they are modified to comply with UK firearms regulations. Often based on a 1911, with a 300 mm barrel and permanently attached wire stock, increasing the overall length to 620 mm. LBPs are chambered in .22 Long Rifle caliber only, and can be used for all events.

== Events and competitions ==
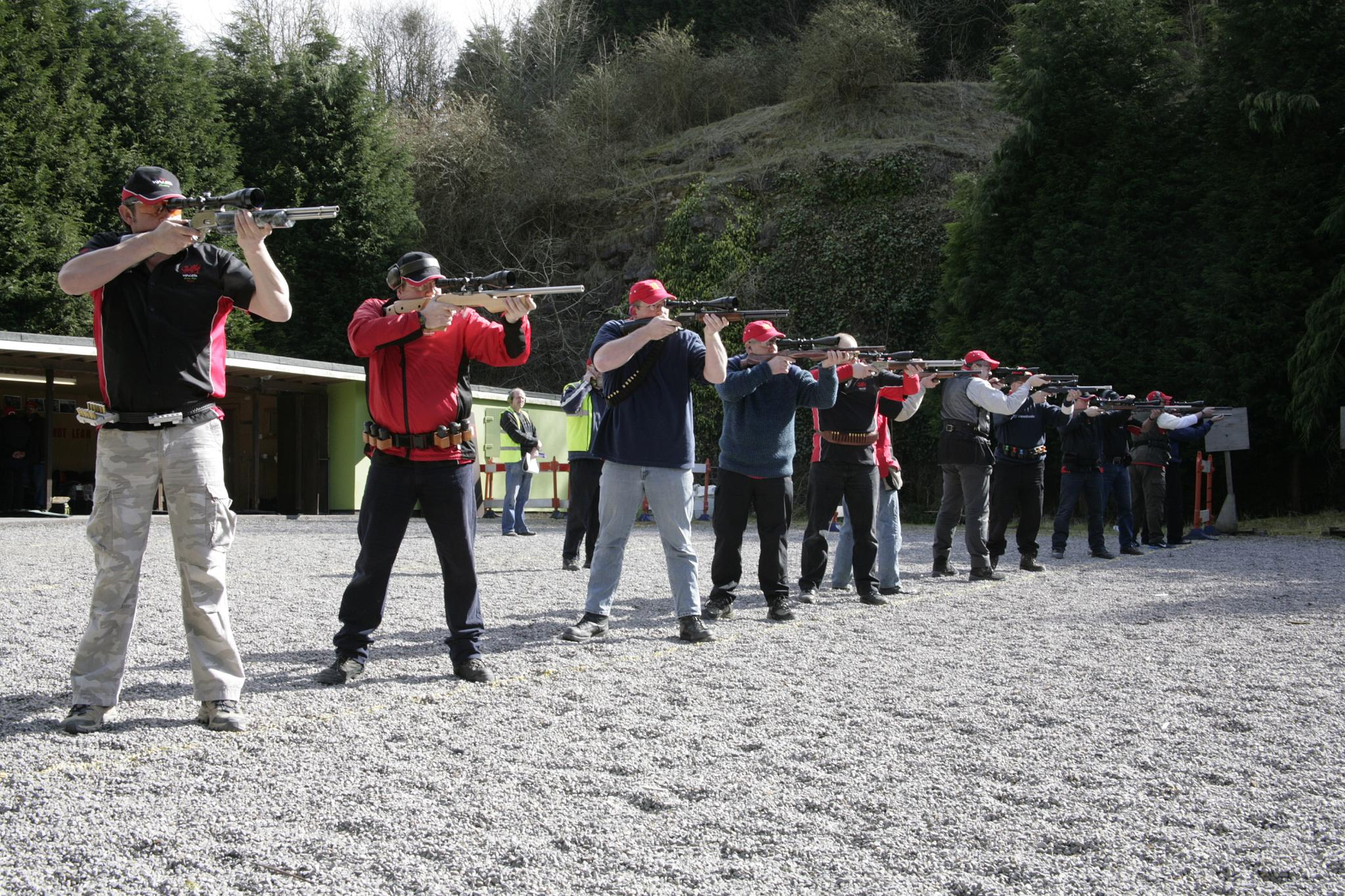
A typical line of competitors shooting a gallery rifle event

A standard set of gallery rifle events exists which have courses of fire and conditions defined in the GR&P Handbook. This allows any club or organisation to run competitions to an international standard. They are essentially broken down into precision style matches and timed matches.

In the UK there are a dozen or more registered national matches held throughout the country. These are open events and scores are recorded into a national database used to specify a shooter's classification.

There are currently four open meetings of similar style and duration held at the National Shooting Centre at Bisley every year. These include the Phoenix meeting held at the end of May and the Gallery Rifle National Championships held at the end of August. The Phoenix meeting is the premier meeting of the year. It attracts over 500 competitors and has a very wide range of events on offer not constrained to just gallery rifle shooting. The National Championships meeting is a little smaller and more focused on the gallery rifle disciplines. This meeting also hosts the GR Home Countries National Match where teams from England, Wales and Scotland compete head to head. The Spring and Autumn meetings start and round off the GR meetings at Bisley respectively.

== List of common events ==
The PL17 target used for rifle and pistol competitions

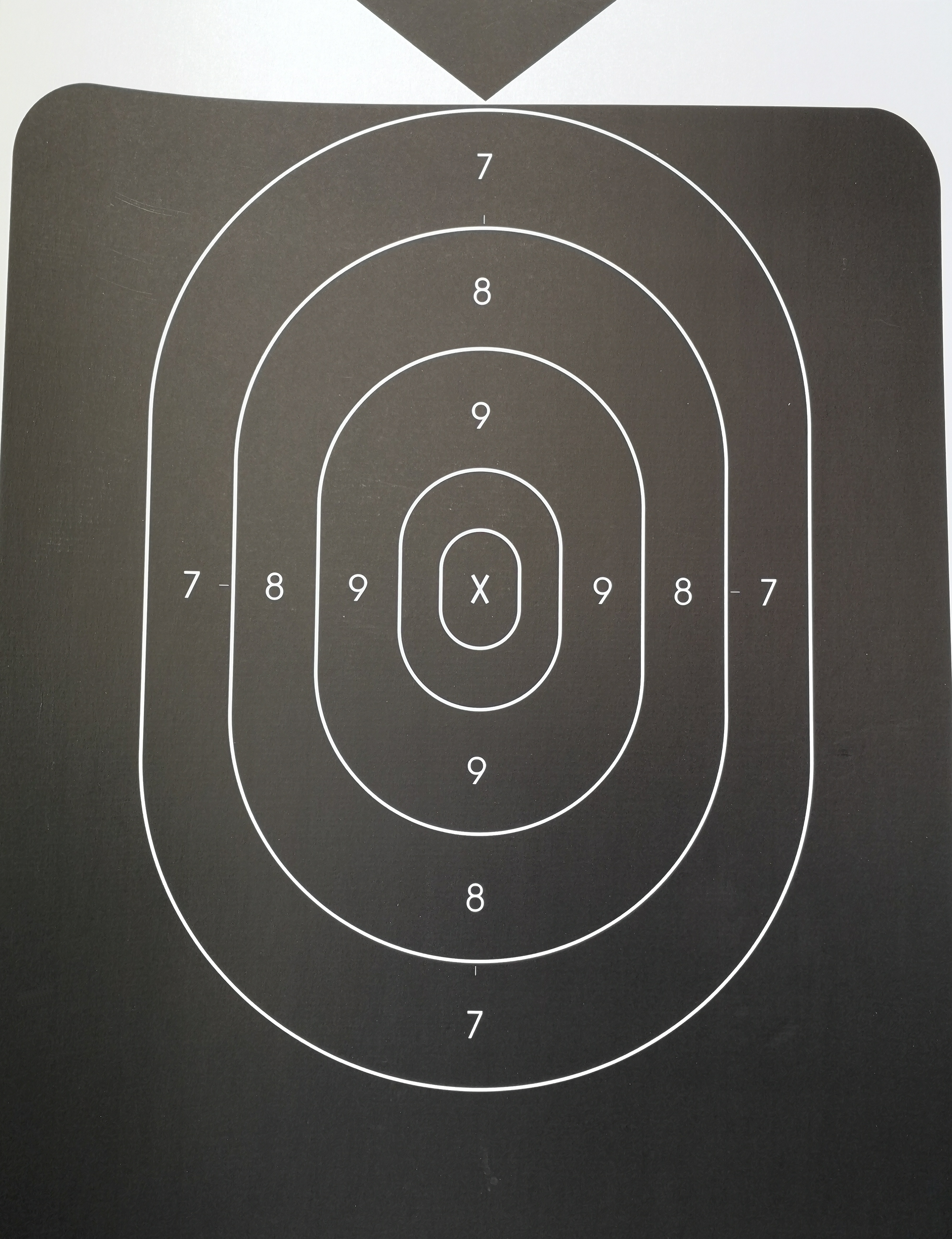
A B1 full size 1500 target

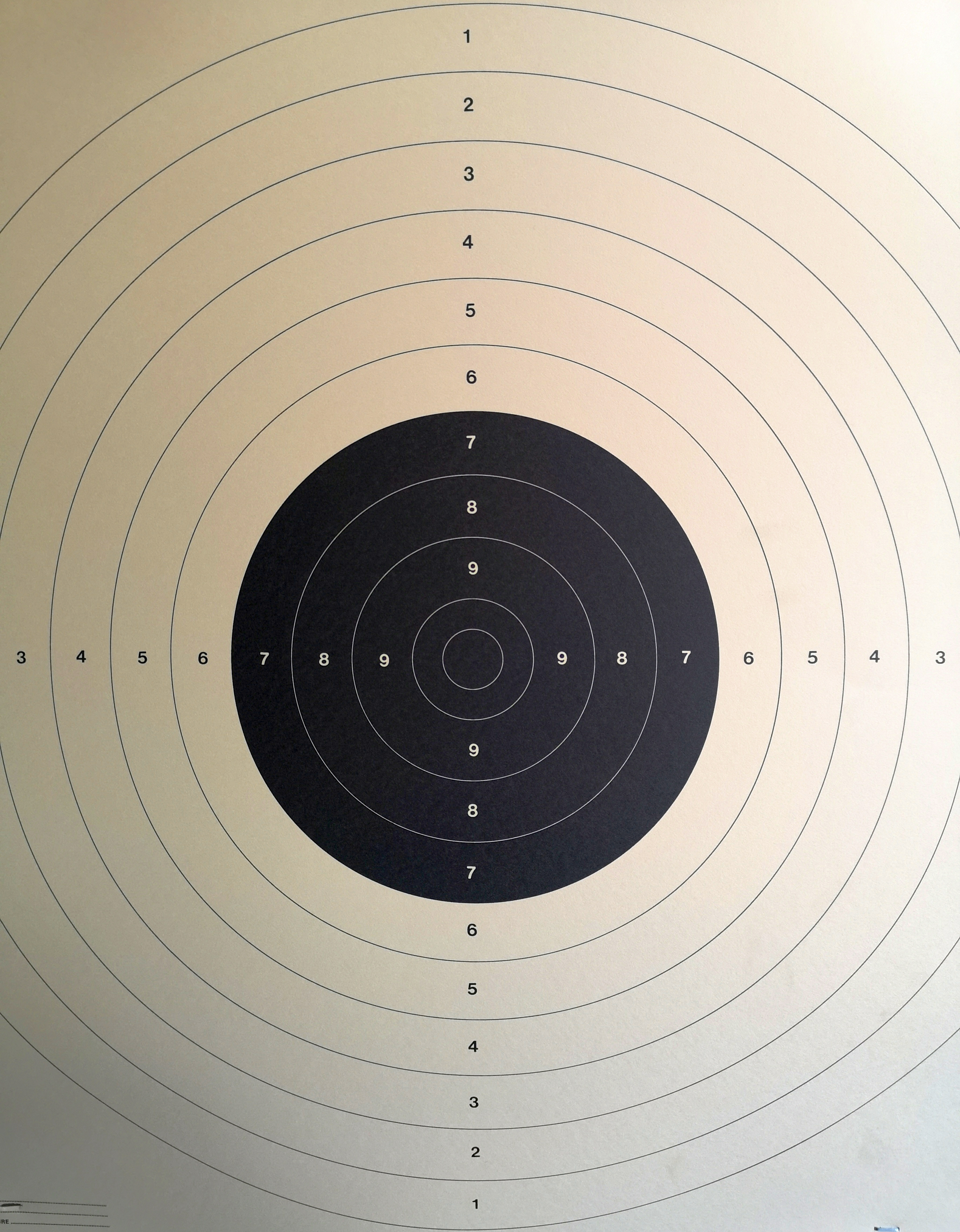
A PL7 Bullseye Target

Competitive meetings offer events for all or a subset of main GR&P gun types - GRCF, GRSB, LBP and LBR. A list of common events is shown. Some events are classified into divisions. The number of divisions varies by event type overall popularity of the event.

Event	Gun Type				Classified	Targets Used	Other names
Event	GRCF	GRSB	LBP	LBR	Classified	Targets Used	Other names
General Events
25m precision	✔	✔	✔	✔		PL7, PL14 (GRSB)	
50m precision	✔	✔	✔	✔		PL7	
America Match	✔	✔	✔	✔		PL7, NRA GR5 (GRSB)	
T&P1	✔	✔	✔	✔	✔	DP2	Timed & Precision 1, Police Pistol 1
T&P2	✔	✔	✔	✔	✔	DP2	Timed & Precision 2, Police Pistol 2
T&P3			✔	✔		TP3	Timed & Precision 3, Police Pistol 3
Multi-Target	✔	✔	✔	✔	✔	DP1	Service Pistol B
Phoenix A	✔	✔	✔	✔	✔	DP1	Service Pistol A
1500	✔	✔	✔	✔	✔	B1	The 1500
1020	✔	✔	✔	✔	✔	B1	The 1020
Bianchi	✔	✔	✔	✔	✔	D1	
WA48			✔	✔		B1	
Advancing Target	✔	✔	✔	✔	✔	DP1	
Granet	✔	✔	✔	✔		PL17	The Granet Match
Silhouettes	✔	✔	✔	✔		PL17	Imperial Silhouettes
Surrenden	✔	✔	✔	✔		PL17	

== See also ==
- List of shooting sports organizations
- National Rifle Association (United Kingdom)
