= Fullbore target rifle =

Shooting sports discipline

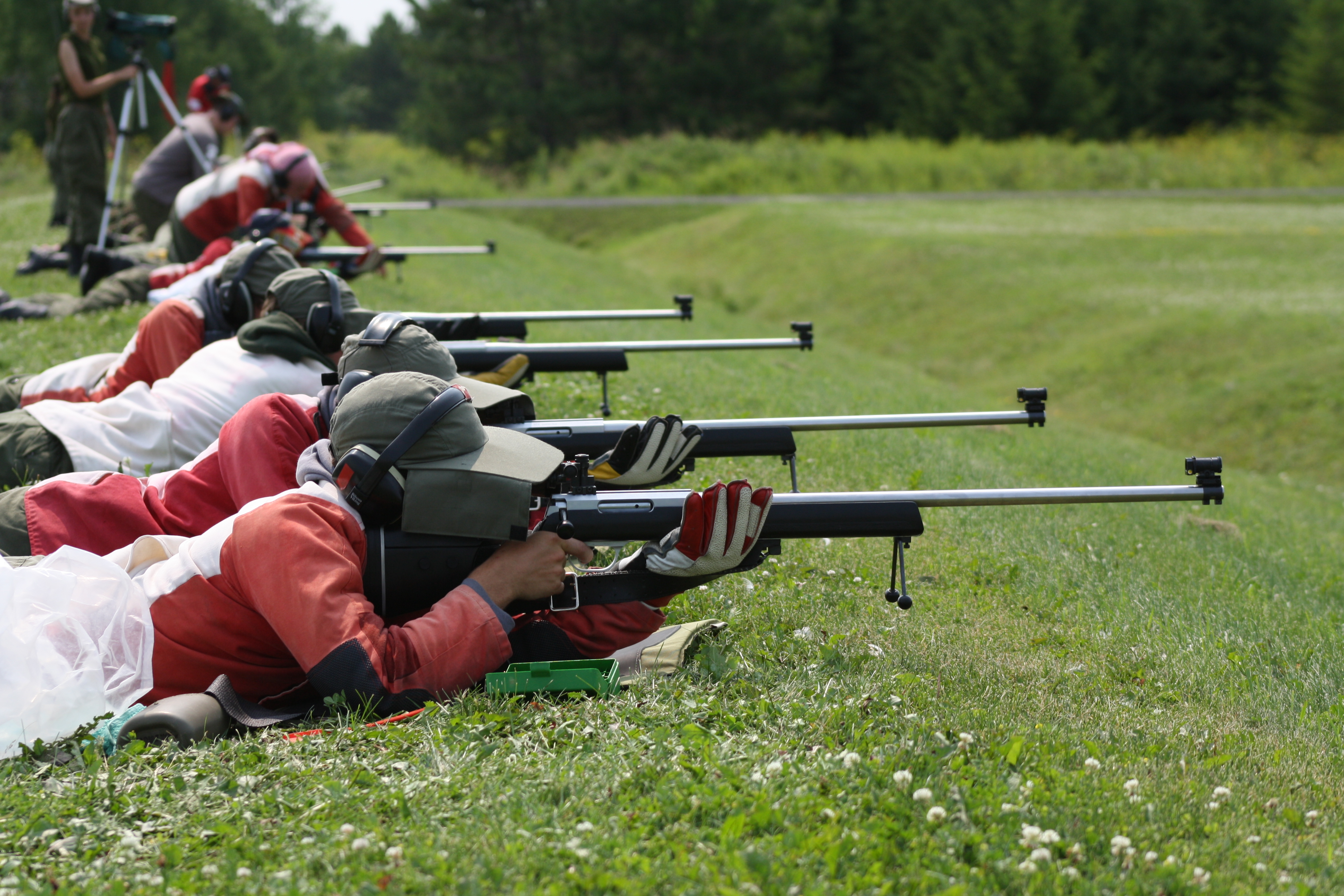
- Fullbore target rifle competition (Palma) in 2011 at Connaught Cadet Training Centre in Ottawa, Canada.
- Highest governing body: ICFRA
- First played: Formally since 1860

Characteristics
- Contact: No
- Team members: Yes or no, depending on competition
- Mixed-sex: Yes
- Type: Shooting sport
- Equipment: Rifle; Jacket; Sling; Ear defenders Cap
- Venue: Rifle range

Presence
- Olympic: Formerly (1900-1924)
- World Championships: Yes

Fullbore target rifle (TR) is a precision rifle shooting-sport discipline governed by the International Confederation of Fullbore Rifle Associations (ICFRA). TR uses single-shot rifles, usually chambered in 7.62mm calibre, with circular "bullseye" targets at distances of 300–1000 yards. The term "fullbore" refers to the relatively large centerfire calibres used. In contrast, smallbore rifle shooting uses firearms chambered for relatively low-powered rimfire cartridges (typically .22LR).

The sport evolved as a British and Commonwealth of Nations discipline in the late 1960s. Its development was heavily influenced by the British National Rifle Association (NRA). Due to this history, it is usually contested amongst the shooting events at the Commonwealth Games, although not at the Olympics. World championships are held on a four-year cycle. The annual NRA Imperial Meeting at Bisley in the UK is globally recognised as an historic annual meeting for the discipline.

Nordic fullbore rifle is a variation arranged by the Scandinavian rifle associations including the National Rifle Association of Norway, DGI Shooting (formerly De Danske Skytteforeninger) and the Swedish Shooting Sport Federation (formerly Frivilliga Skytterörelsen). Nordic field shooting competitions are shot at varied distances out to 600 m.

== Naming conventions ==
Many rifles can be described as "target rifles" or "match rifles" in the general sense (being accurate rifles suitable for shooting targets). Within the context of fullbore rifle shooting, "target rifle" (TR) and "match rifle" (MR) refer to specific classes in NRA and ICFRA competition.

- NRA target rifle – discipline defined by Rule 150 of the British National Rifle Association.
- ICFRA target rifle – discipline defined by ICFRA. Slightly more permissive than NRA TR, rifles can typically be used for either with minor adjustments such as minimum trigger weight. Sometimes referred to as "Palma rifle" (esp. in the United States) in reference to the world championship Palma Match.
- Match rifle – discipline defined by Rule 156 of the British National Rifle Association.
- F-class – discipline using TR-type rifles with rests and telescopic sights

== History ==
Originally derived from service rifle, target rifle was shot with rifles of military origin, and the rules followed the adoption of cartridges by the military – from the .451 Whitworth to the .303 Lee–Metford, and eventually to 7.62 NATO and .308 Winchester. Modifications such as aftermarket stocks and barrels became increasingly common but rifles were nonetheless built around actions of military design. NRA rules required rifles to be "available in quantity", intended to level the playing field and prevent the use of fully customised one-off designs.

In 1970, George Swenson and Laurie Ingram developed the Swing rifle as an alternative to the dominant designs of the day, which were built around the Lee-Enfield No. 4 and Mauser 1898. Alongside the Australian Omark Model 44, the Swing was one of the first actions designed explicitly for target shooting, with attention paid to a short lock time and clean trigger break. The Swing ultimately evolved into the Paramount and RPA Quadlock rifles. The 1970s also saw the development of the Mauser-influenced Musgrave target rifle in South Africa, with the New Zealand made Barnard Model P action entering production in 1982.

Match rifle developed concurrently with target rifle, focussed on longer ranges (1000–1500 yards, where target rifle was contested at 300–1000 yards). The rules were less stringent and allowed more experimentation and deviation from the basic military rifles that designs were based on. Telescopic sights were permitted, and shooters had the choice of shooting prone (lying on their front) or supine (lying on their back).

F-class is a relatively modern development, gaining popularity in the early 2000s. Developed in Canada by George "Farky" Farquharson (from whom "F"-class is derived), it began by resting a TR-compliant rifle on a bipod and adding a telescopic sight. This permitted continued participation amongst older shooters with deteriorating sight, or who could not adopt a typical prone position. With time, innovation led to the creation of the F-open class, which allowed more experimentation than was allowed in F-TR.

== Equipment ==
=== Standardised rifle ===
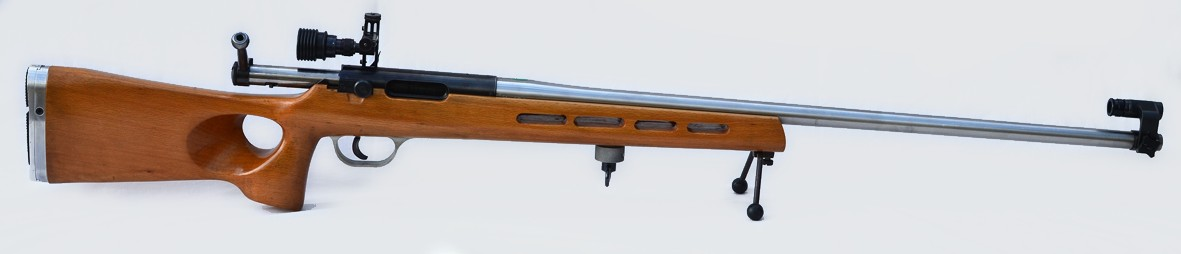
Swing Mk4 target rifle with wooden thumbhole stock

NRA target rifle is characterised by stringent standardisation of rifle characteristics such as sights and calibre. To level the playing field and to make it possible for riflemen of all budgets to compete seriously, the rifle or all its component parts must be 'readily available in quantity'. Rifles are limited to a weight of 6.5 kg and a minimum trigger pull of 1.5 kg. Where a magazine is fitted, it may only be used as a loading platform for single rounds.

Under ICFRA rules, the minimum trigger pull is reduced to 0.5 kg.

=== Sights ===
Aperture sights which are fully adjustable for elevation and windage. A single magnifying lens (known as an "eagle eye") may be used in the front of the foresight to enlarge the image of the target in relation to the foresight element and diopter, without providing a telescopic sight.

=== Calibers ===
.303 British (standard military) was used until the late 1950s when NATO adopted the .308 Winchester/7.62×51mm NATO as the new military interoperable choice of ammunition. Under NRA and ICFRA Rules, .223 Remington/5.56×45 NATO is permitted as an alternative. However, many matches such as the NRA Imperial Meeting require competitors to use issued ammunition - which is typically only offered in .308. The .303 British calibre is still in use by service rifle shooters and was exclusively used by in the Short, Magazine Lee–Enfield (SMLE) No.1 Mk. III and Lee-Enfield No. 4 rifles.

=== Clothing ===
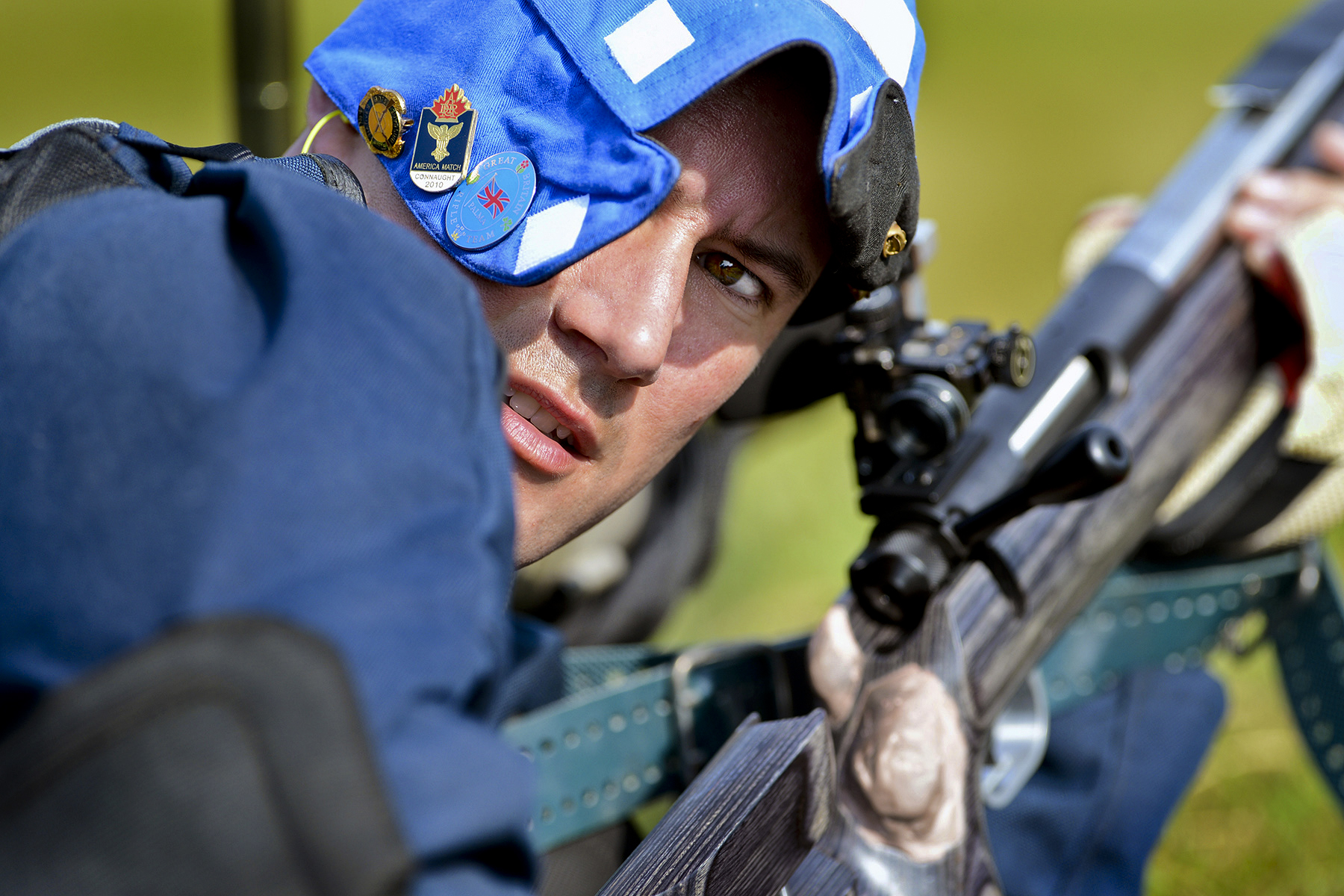
A US shooter with sling and glove visible

Modern target rifle shooters commonly use specialised stiff leather or canvas shooting jackets to maintain a stable prone position. Riflemen also widely wear shooting gloves on their support hand to stabilise the rifle and to protect the hand from a single point sling.

== Competitions ==
World championships have been organised by ICFRA since 2003 and are held on a four-year cycle. Championships for TR-class and F-class are held separately, offset by two years. The TR championship includes both an individual and a team event. The team event is known historically as the Palma Match and the team champions are awarded the Palma Trophy, which dates to 1876.

Fullbore rifle is contested within the Shooting events at the Commonwealth Games. These are the only major multi-sport games to include the discipline, with other events such as the Olympic or Asian games focussing on ISSF-regulated smallbore and air rifle disciplines. The Commonwealth Shooting Federation (CSF) also holds a CSF Championship in the run-up to the Games, serving as a test-event for the games venues and final selection opportunity for games squads.

The Imperial Meeting, organised by the British NRA at the National Shooting Centre, Bisley is regarded as one of the leading target rifle events globally, and has been hugely influential in the development of the sport. National teams routinely travel to the meeting, particularly from Commonwealth nations. The Kolapore Match is contested annually by the international teams in attendance. The Dominion of Canada Rifle Association constructed the Macdonald-Stewart Pavilion (a.k.a. "Canada House") on Bisley Camp in 1897 specifically to accommodate the Canadian team. Bisley's influence is further illustrated by the South African terminology, where target rifle is called "Bisley shooting", the governing body is the South African Bisley Union (SABU) with almost any target shooting competition known as a "Bisley".

In Canada, target rifle competitions at the national level are regulated by the Dominion of Canada Rifle Association.

The annual US national championship is currently held during August at Camp Perry in Port Clinton, Ohio.

== Variations ==
=== Match rifle ===
Match rifle is a long-range target shooting discipline shot at 1,000 to 1,200 yards (approximately 914 to 1,097 meters), peculiar to the UK and several Commonwealth of Nations countries, and run according to rules set out by the British National Rifle Association. The Elcho Shield is an example of an annual match rifle competition.

Match rifle can be thought of as an extreme, experimental version of target rifle (TR).

The key technical differences to target rifle are:

- Telescopic sights are permitted.
- Hand-loaded ammunition is permitted. For .308 / 7.62, match rifle would typically use bullets weighing between 190 and 230 grains, as opposed to the 155 grain bullets normally used in TR
- A rest may be used to steady the hand supporting the rifle (a sling as used in TR is also an option), but the rifle may not be directly supported by a rest or bipod.
- Whilst most people shoot match rifle prone, the supine (“back position”) is permissible and used by a sizeable minority

A small number (who would be unable for medical reasons to shoot prone or supine) shoot seated at tables.

Most shoots involve 15 or 20 shots to count (usually with two convertible sighting shots permitted) at each of 1000, 1100 and 1200 yards. With few ranges extending back to match rifle distances, most shooting in the UK takes place on Stickledown Range at Bisley. Any NRA-compliant target rifle will also be compliant with match rifle rules provided the barrel does not exceed 2.5 kg.

=== F-class rifle ===
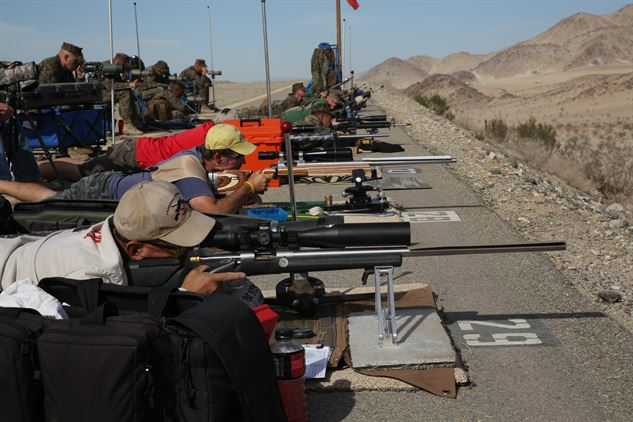
In F-class, telescopic sights, rear bags, and either a bipod or front rest is permitted. The nearest shooter has a bipod, the next one a pedestal rest

F-class is a recent variant of fullbore target rifle which permits optical telescopic sights and shooting rests such as a pedestal rest or a bipod at the front of the rifle and a tightly packed sandbag at the rear of the rifle. Competitions are fired at distances from 300 to 1000 yards. The center of the target has an extra scoring ring which is half the size of the smallest one used in traditional target rifle shooting and each ring scores one point less than it does for target rifle. Competitors can choose to compete in one of the two classes F(Open) or F/TR:

- F-open (open class): All rifle calibres up to 8 mm (0.31 in) may be used, along with a scope, and one can choose between using front rest and rear bag, or a bipod/ backpack, also with a rear bag. The weight limit including optics is 10 kg (22 lb).
- F/TR (F-target rifle): A restricted class permitting a scope, bipod/ backpack and rear bag (no front rest), but the rifle has to be of either calibre .223 Remington or .308 Winchester and the bullet may be of any weight. In addition, the weight limit (including optics) for the rifle is 8.25 kg (18.2 lb). The designation "target rifle" here reflects the original intention that it would appeal to elderly or less physically able TR shooters who wished to remain in the sport while using their original equipment.

== See also ==
- Glossary of target rifle terms
- International Confederation of Fullbore Rifle Associations
- High power rifle and Civilian Marksmanship Program, U.S. variants
