= Shooting at the 2022 Bolivarian Games =

Shooting competitions at the 2022 Bolivarian Games

- Shooting pictogram
- Venue: Polígono Fedetiro Nilo
- Dates: 27 June – 3 July 2022
- Competitors: 95 from 10 nations

Champions
- Guatemala (4 gold, 9 silver, 2 bronze)

Shooting competitions at the 2022 Bolivarian Games in Valledupar, Colombia were held from 27 June to 3 July 2022 at Polígono Fedetiro Nilo in Nilo, a sub-venue outside Valledupar.

Fourteen medal events were contested, six for each men and women and two mixed gender events. A total of 95 athletes (56 men and 39 women) competed in the events. The events were open competitions without age restrictions.

It was planned that a mixed skeet event would be held, but finally did not take place.

Guatemala were the shooting competitions defending champions after having won them in the previous edition in Santa Marta 2017. Guatemala and Peru won 4 gold medals each, however, Guatemala reached seven more silver medals (9–2) than Peru to win the shooting competitions again.

== Participating nations ==
A total of 10 nations (all the 7 ODEBO nations and 3 invited) registered athletes for the shooting competitions. Each nation was able to enter up to 24 athletes (12 per gender), with a maximum of 2 athletes per singles events and a maximum of two teams per mixed events.

- Bolivia (8 athletes)
- Chile (7)
- Colombia (12)
- Ecuador (6)
- El Salvador (8)
- Dominican Republic (4)
- Guatemala (19)
- Panama (6)
- Peru (16)
- Venezuela (9)

== Venue ==
The shooting competitions were held at the Polígono Fedetiro Nilo, headquarters of the Federación Colombiana de Tiro y Caza, in Nilo, department of Cundinamarca.

== Medal summary ==
=== Medal table ===
* Host nation (Host nation)

Rank	Nation	Gold	Silver	Bronze	Total
1	Guatemala	4	9	2	15
2	Peru	4	2	6	12
3	Colombia	2	0	1	3
4	El Salvador	2	0	0	2
5	Chile	1	0	2	3
6	Dominican Republic	1	0	0	1
7	Ecuador	0	3	1	4
8	Venezuela	0	0	3	3
9	Bolivia	0	0	1	1
Totals (9 entries)		14	14	16	44

Source: Bolivarianos Valledupar 2022 – Shooting medals

=== Medalists ===
==== Men's events ====
Event	Gold	Silver	Bronze
10 metre air pistol	Juan Sebastián Rivera; Colombia	José Pablo Vidal; Guatemala	Marko Carrillo; Peru
25 metre rapid fire pistol	Marko Carrillo; Peru	Kevin Altamirano; Peru	Douglas Gómez; Venezuela
10 metre air rifle	Israel Gutierrez; El Salvador	Cristian Morales; Peru	Julio Iemma; Venezuela
50 metre rifle three positions	Cristian Morales; Peru	Kenny Matta; Guatemala	Julio César Iemma; Venezuela
Skeet	Héctor Flores; Chile	Santiago Romero; Guatemala	Nicolás Massoud; Chile
Trap	Eduardo Lorenzo; Dominican Republic	Hebert Brol; Guatemala	Alessandro de Souza Ferreira; Peru

=== Women's events ===
Event	Gold	Silver	Bronze
10 metre air pistol	Juana Rueda; Colombia	Andrea Pérez; Ecuador	Annia Becerra; Peru
25 metre pistol	Brianda Rivera; Peru	Andrea Pérez; Ecuador	Lucía Menéndez; Guatemala
10 metre air rifle	Polymaría Velásquez; Guatemala	Jazmine Matta; Guatemala	Gladys Aguilera; Chile
50 metre rifle three positions	Polymaría Velasquez; Guatemala	Ingrid Vela; Guatemala	Alexia Arenas; Peru
Skeet	Daniella Borda; Peru	Emily Padilla; Guatemala	Madeleine Velasco; Bolivia
Trap	Waleska Soto; Guatemala	Adriana Ruano; Guatemala	Valentina Porcella; Peru

=== Mixed events ===
Event	Gold	Silver	Bronze
10 metre air pistol team	Guatemala (GUA); Kimberly Linares; José Pablo Castillo	Ecuador (ECU); Andrea Pérez; Yautung Cueva	Colombia (COL); Juana Rueda; Alex Peralta
10 metre air pistol team	Guatemala (GUA); Kimberly Linares; José Pablo Castillo	Ecuador (ECU); Andrea Pérez; Yautung Cueva	Guatemala (GUA); Lucía Menéndez; Albino Jiménez
10 metre air rifle team	El Salvador (ESA); Ana Ramírez; Israel Gutierrez	Guatemala (GUA); Jazmine Matta; Douglas Oliva	Peru (PER); Alexia Arenas; Cristian Morales
10 metre air rifle team	El Salvador (ESA); Ana Ramírez; Israel Gutierrez	Guatemala (GUA); Jazmine Matta; Douglas Oliva	Ecuador (ECU); Karina Cruz; Milton Camacho
