= Ashburton Shield =

Rifle marksmanship trophy

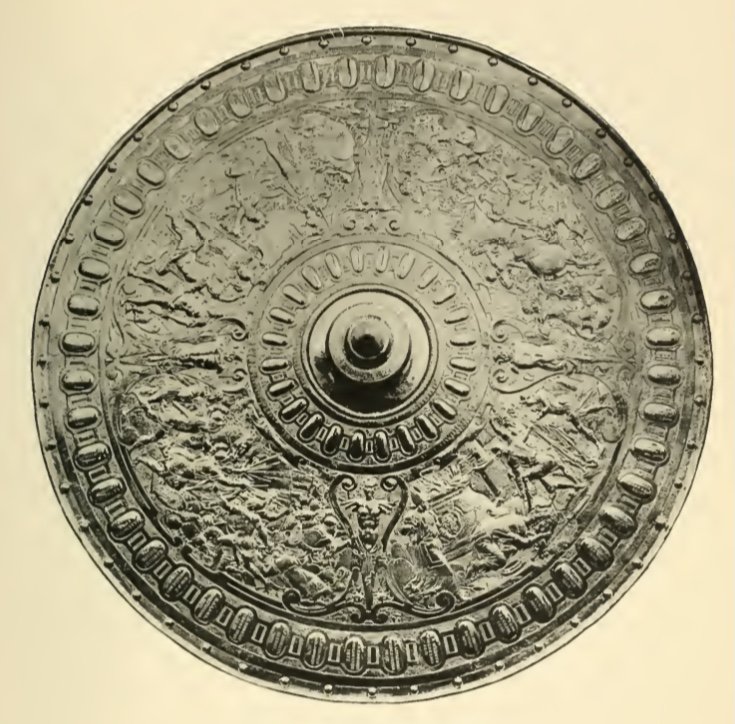
- The Ashburton Shield
- Sport: Fullbore target rifle
- Competition: Ashburton VIII, Schools Imperial Meeting
- Awarded for: Winning Team of VIII
- Location: Bisley Camp
- Country: United Kingdom
- Presented by: National Rifle Association

History
- First award: 1861
- Editions: 151
- First winner: Rugby School
- Most wins: Epsom College (17)
- Most recent: Epsom College (2026)

The Ashburton Shield is an historic trophy for target rifle shooting in the British Isles. It was awarded annually to the winning team of VIII at the Schools' Meeting (previously the Public Schools' Meeting), held at Bisley by the National Rifle Association. The competition was open to teams of cadets from, predominantly, Combined Cadet Force units based in public and private schools. (Note: A separate competition was held the week prior for cadet units not attached to a school (such as the Army Cadet Force), as part of the Inter-Services Cadet Rifle Meeting (ISCRM).)

With the decommissioning of the L81A2 Cadet Target Rifle (CTR), effective 1 January 2026, and removal of fullbore shooting as a recognised cadet activity the Inter Services Cadet Rifle Meeting (ISCRM) and the Combined Cadet Forces (CCF) Schools’ Meeting ceased.

== History ==
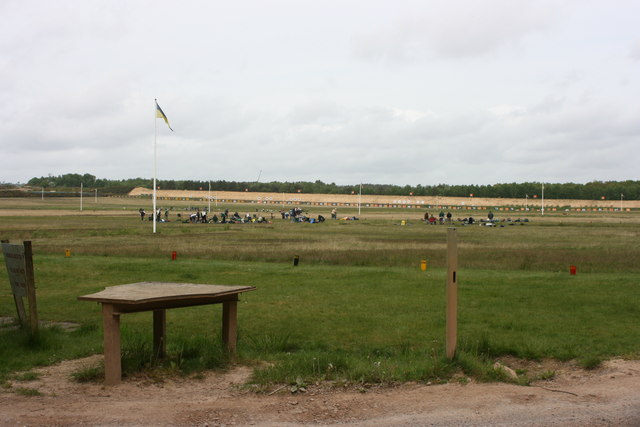
Century Range, Bisley, where the Ashburton Shield has been contested since 1890

The Ashburton Shield was presented by Lord Ashburton in 1861 for competition between the Junior Officers' Training Corps that were run within public schools. This remained the case until the 1948 merger of school cadet units into the Combined Cadet Force. The shield was first contested at the National Rifle Association's second Imperial Meeting. It was mentioned by Edward Walford in 1878 when he wrote of the Meeting, then at Wimbledon:

These annual gatherings are attended by the élite of fashion, and always include a large number of ladies, who generally evince the greatest interest in the target practice of the various competitors, whether it be for the honour of carrying off the Elcho Shield, the Queen's or the Prince of Wales's Prize, or the [Ashburton] shield shot for by our great Public Schools, or the Annual Rifle Match between the Houses of Lords and Commons.

The runner-up team is awarded the Montague-Jones Challenge Trophy, which was first presented in 1947 by the OTC Officers Club in memory of Major Montague-Jones OBE TD, and eight NRA bronze medals. The third place team are awarded eight NRA bronze medals. The Allhallows Salver, presented in 1987 by Allhallows College, is awarded to the coach of the winning school.

The Public Schools' Meeting is considered the pinnacle of inter-school shooting in the UK, and British Pathé featured the event in multiple newsreels. It has been held annually, with the exception of 1915–18 and 1940–45 due to the outbreak of war, and 2020–21 when the meeting was placed in abeyance due to the COVID-19 pandemic. Epsom College hold the record for the most wins, at 17.

Notable winners include 2018 ISSF World Champion Seonaid McIntosh, who was a member of the 2013 winning team from Dollar Academy. McIntosh individually won the Schools Hundred competition.

== Results by year ==
Scores in bold indicate a record for that competition format.

Year	Winner	Score	Runner Up	Score	Third Place	Score
1861	Rugby School					
1862	Harrow School					
1863	Eton College					
1864	Harrow School (2)					
1865	Harrow School (3)					
1866	Harrow School (4)					
1867	Harrow School (5)					
1868	Eton College (2)					
1869	Harrow School (6)					
1870	Harrow School (7)					
1871	Winchester College					
1872	Winchester College (2)					
1873	Winchester College (3)					
1874	Marlborough College					
1875	Harrow School (8)					
1876	Winchester College (4)					
1877	Cheltenham College					
1878	Eton College (3)					
1879	Harrow School (9)					
1880	Eton College (4)					
1881	Cheltenham College (2)					
1882	Charterhouse School					
1883	Charterhouse School (2)					
1884	Clifton College					
1885	Clifton College (2)					
1886	Dulwich College					
1887	Eton College (5)					
1888	Clifton College (3)					
1889	Charterhouse School (3)					
1890	Charterhouse School (4)					
1891	Charterhouse School (5)					
1892	Charterhouse School (6)					
1893	Bradford School					
1894	Rugby School (2)					
1895	Charterhouse School (7)					
1896	Charterhouse School (8)					
1897	Bradford School (2)					
1898	Charterhouse School (9)					
1899	Rossall School					
1900	Dulwich College (2)					
1901	Eton College (6)					
1902	Cheltenham College (3)					
1903	Tonbridge School					
1904	Winchester College (5)					
1905	Harrow School (10)					
1906	Dover College					
1907	Rugby School (2)					
1908	Harrow School (11)					
1909	Rugby School (3)					
1910	Bradford School (3)					
1911	Edinburgh Academy					
1912	Rugby School (4)					
1913	Repton School					
1914	Sedbergh School	496	Eton College	490	Harrow School	490
1915–18	No Competition					
1919	Winchester College (6)					
1920	Charterhouse School (10)					
1921	Sedbergh School (2)					
1922	Lancing College					
1923	Eton College (7)					
1924	Rugby School (5)					
1925	Lancing College (2)					
1926	Clifton College (4)					
1927	Brighton College					
1928	Clifton College (5)					
1929	Glenalmond College					
1930	Winchester College (10)					
1931	Charterhouse School (11)					
1932	King's College School	479	Christ's Hospital	472	Whitgift School	471
1933	Glenalmond College (2)	487	Winchester College	480	Marlborough College	478
1934	King's College School (2)	493	Malvern College	487		
1935	Marlborough College (2)	499	Winchester College	498	Whitgift School	494
1936	Brighton College (2)	477	Denstone College	477	The Glasgow Academy	472
1937	Winchester College (11)	477	Bradfield College	474	Clifton College	467
1938	King's College School (3)	497	Marlborough College	488	Winchester College	486
1939	Cranbrook School	482	King's College School	481	Glenalmond College	473
1940–45	No Competition					
1946	Blundell's School	461	Sedbergh School	460	Eton College	460
1947	Eton College (8)	517	Glenalmond College	509	George Watson's	508
1948	Charterhouse School (12)	500	Allhallows College	498	Bradfield College	496
1949	Glenalmond College (3)	512	Charterhouse School	511	The Leys School	510
1950	The Leys School	513	Epsom College	507	King's College School	507
1951	Allhallows College	511	St Paul's, London	510	Marlborough College	508
1952	Glenalmond College (4)	512	Epsom College	511	Exeter School	510
1953	The Leys School (2)	508	Charterhouse School	505	Allhallows College	504
1954	Allhallows College (2)	524	Uppingham School	515	Marlborough College	514
1955	Winchester College (12)	515	Marlborough College	512	Glenalmond College	512
1956	Blundell's School (2)	515	Victoria College	514	Elizabeth College	513
1957	Uppingham School	529	Elizabeth College	528	Allhallows College	513
1958	Repton School (2)	508	Blundell's School	506	Epsom College	505
1959	St Lawrence College	517	Oakham School	511	Allhallows College	511
1960	Allhallows College (3)	524	Ardingly College	522	Glenalmond College	520
1961	Victoria College	516	Epsom College	512	Glenalmond College	512
1962	Ardingly College	524	Victoria College	519	Oakham School	515
1963	Allhallows College (4)	522	Marlborough College	515	Dean Close School	515
1964	Allhallows College (5)	519	Uppingham School	519	Oakham School	519
1965	Allhallows College (6)	521	Merchant Taylors'	519	Aldenham School	517
1966	Oakham School	502	Harrow School	500	Allhallows College	499
1967	Cranleigh School	522	King's, Canterbury	513	Epsom College	512
1968	Gresham's School	518	Oakham School	517	Cranleigh School	511
1969	Uppingham School (2)	525	Allhallows College	519	Victoria College	515
1970	Bradfield College	515	Clifton College	514	Oakham School	513
1971	Merchant Taylors'	512	Uppingham School	509	St Peter's, York	508
1972	Oakham School (2)	507.38v	Cranleigh School	507.37v	Gresham's School	506.36v
1973	Epsom College	502.28v	Bradfield College	497.32v	Clifton College	496.27v
1974	Clifton College (6)	499	Bedford School	482	Marlborough College	481
1975	Oakham School (2)	499	Christ's Hospital	491	Lancing College	490
1976	Uppingham School (3)		Lancing College		Victoria College	
1977	Allhallows College (7)	505	Epsom College	505	Clifton College	503
1978	Uppingham School (4)	511	Malvern College	505	Oakham School	505
1979	Rugby School (6)	513	Uppingham School	509	Haileybury College	498
1980	Bradfield College (2)	512	Uppingham School	511	Clifton College	509
1981	Uppingham School (4)	508	Elizabeth College	504	Marlborough College	504
1982	Uppingham School (5)	504	Marlborough College	502	St John's School	501
1983	Malvern College	519	Uppingham School	516	Epsom College	515
1984	Bedford School	521	Harrow School	518	Wellington College	516
1985	Bradfield College (3)	525	Oundle School	523	Elizabeth College	518
1986	RGS Guildford	512	Cheltenham College	511	Marlborough College	507
1987	Oakham School (3)	535	Bradfield College	523	Kimbolton School	519
1988	Charterhouse School (13)	508	Dollar Academy	507	Uppingham School	503
1989	Elizabeth College	493	Glenalmond College	492	Wellington College	488
1990	Epsom College (2)	511	Oundle School	507	Marlborough College	504
1991	Epsom College (3)	506.40v	Wellington College	502.30v	Bradfield College	500.34v
1992	Epsom College (4)	512.42v	Marlborough College	507.31v	Bradfield College	505.35v
1993	Epsom College (5)	518.47v	RGS Guildford	518.34v	Elizabeth College	515.37v
1994	Epsom College (6)	525.44v	Wellington College	515.40v	Cheltenham College	513.40v
1995	Uppingham School (6)	462	RGS Guildford	456	Campbell College	451
1996	Sedbergh School (3)	461				
1997	Sedbergh School (4)	480	Cheltenham College	462	Elizabeth College	457
1998	Epsom College (7)	474	Sedbergh School	473	Campbell College	471
1999	Epsom College (8)	491	Campbell College	482	The Oratory School	469
2000	Stamford School	**550.46v**	Epsom College	509.35v	Harrow School	507.23v
2001	Uppingham School (7)	476	Epsom College	468	Sedbergh School	450
2002	Epsom College (9)	486	Uppingham School	479	The Oratory School	474
2003	Stamford School (2)	507.31v	Epsom College	506.32v	Marlborough College	504.29v
2004	Epsom College (10)	511.31v	Marlborough College	508.32v	Uppingham School	505.36v
2005	Dollar Academy	760.43v	Epsom College	747.46v	Stamford School	742.36v
2006	Epsom College (11)	788.59v	Marlborough College	775.46v	The Oratory School	775.45v
2007	Epsom College (12)	**794.63v**	Marlborough College	782.58v	The Oratory School	771.40v
2008	Epsom College (13)	790.75v	Dollar Academy	779.50v	The Oratory School	766.52v
2009	Gresham's School (2)	794.59v	Dollar Academy	774.62v	Elizabeth College	770.52v
2010	Epsom College (14)	762.42v	Gresham's School	762.40v	Cheltenham College	753.39v
2011	Epsom College (15)	762.40v	Cheltenham College	760.46v	Wellington College	752.41v
2012	Wellington College (1)	787.71v	RGS Guildford	770.49v	Epsom College	760.43v
2013	Dollar Academy (2)	757.39v	Epsom College	744.40v	Wellington College	741.41v
2014	Wellington College (2)	755.42v	Epsom College	738.36v	Elizabeth College	736.43v
2015	Ellesmere College	745.42v	Dollar Academy	734.35v	Victoria College	733.31v
2016	Wellington College (3)	761.37v	Dollar Academy	760.53v	Gresham's School	758.42v
2017	Wellington College (4)	772.53v	Elizabeth College	749.38v	Sedbergh School	747.47v
2018	Sedbergh School (5)	761.47v	Victoria College	756.52v	Gresham's School	753.44v
2019	RGS Guildford (2)	759.44v	Gresham's School	756.40v	Sedbergh School	754.48v
2020–21	No Competition					
2022	Bradfield College (4)	691.22v	Sedbergh School	678.18v	Dollar Academy	673.18v
2023	Victoria College (2)	758.35v	Epsom College	744.37v	Bradfield College	740.33v
2024	Epsom College (16)	778.59v	Wellington College	758.40v	Elizabeth College	755.50v
2025	Wellington College (5)	764.48v	Epsom College	752.49v	Gresham's School	742.37v
2026	Epsom College (17)	798.59v	Wellington College	796.77v	Bradfield College	782.53v

== Performances ==
Schools in bold competed for the Ashburton Shield at the 2025 Schools' Meeting.

Wins	School	Years
17	**Epsom College**	1973, 1990–94, 1998–99, 2002, 2004, 2006–08, 2010–11, 2024, 2026
13	**Charterhouse School**	1882–83, 1889–92, 1895–96, 1898, 1920, 1931, 1948, 1988
11	Harrow School	1862, 1864–67, 1969, 1870, 1875, 1879, 1905, 1908
9	Winchester College	1871–73, 1876, 1904, 1919, 1930, 1937, 1955
8	Eton College	1863, 1868, 1878, 1880, 1887, 1901, 1923, 1947
8	**Uppingham School**	1957, 1969, 1976, 1978, 1981–82, 1995, 2001
7	Rugby School	1861, 1894, 1907, 1909, 1912, 1924, 1979
7	Allhallows College	1951, 1954, 1960, 1963–65, 1977
6	Clifton College	1884–85, 1888, 1926, 1928, 1974
5	**Sedbergh School**	1914, 1921, 1996–97, 2018
5	**Wellington College**	2012, 2014, 2016–17, 2025
4	Glenalmond College	1929, 1933, 1949, 1952
4	Oakham School	1966, 1972, 1975, 1987
4	**Bradfield College**	1970, 1980, 1985, 2022
3	Cheltenham College	1877, 1881, 1902
3	Bradford School	1893, 1897, 1910
3	King's College School	1932, 1934, 1938
2	Marlborough College	1874, 1935
2	Dulwich College	1886, 1900
2	Repton School	1913, 1958
2	Lancing College	1922, 1925
2	Brighton College	1927, 1936
2	Blundell's School	1946, 1956
2	The Leys School	1950, 1953
2	**Victoria College**	1961, 2023
2	**Gresham's School**	1968, 2009
2	**RGS Guildford**	1986, 2019
2	Stamford School	2000, 2003
2	**Dollar Academy**	2005, 2013
1	Rossall School	1899
1	**Tonbridge School**	1903
1	Dover College	1906
1	Edinburgh Academy	1911
1	Cranbrook School	1939
1	St Lawrence College	1959
1	Ardingly College	1962
1	Cranleigh School	1967
1	Merchant Taylors'	1971
1	Malvern College	1983
1	Bedford School	1984
1	**Elizabeth College**	1989
1	Ellesmere College	2015
