= Bisley, Surrey =

Village and parish in Surrey, England

Coordinates: 51.330°N 0.640°W

Bisley
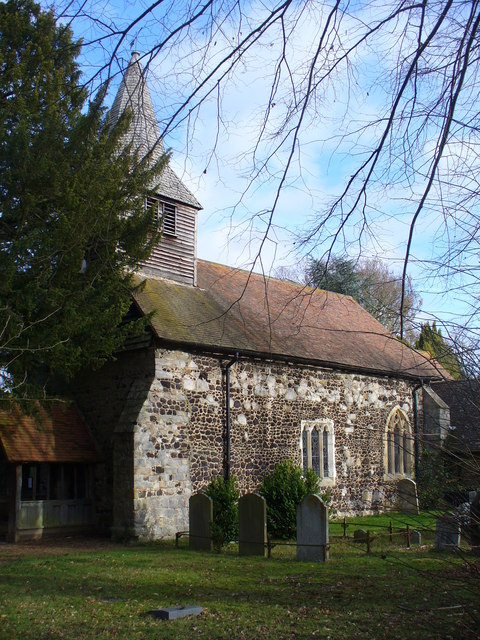
- St John the Baptist Church

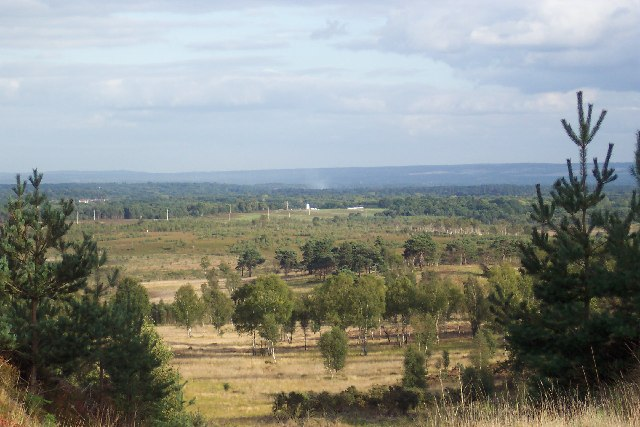
- Bisley Camp

- Location within Surrey
- Area: 3.66 km^{2} (1.41 sq mi)
- Population: 3,965 (Civil Parish)
  - Density: 1,083/km^{2} (2,800/sq mi)
- OS grid reference: SU9560
- Civil parish: Bisley
- District: Surrey Heath
- Shire county: Surrey
- Region: South East
- Country: England
- Sovereign state: United Kingdom
- Post town: Woking
- Postcode district: GU24
- Dialling code: 01483
- Police: Surrey
- Fire: Surrey
- Ambulance: South East Coast
- UK Parliament: Surrey Heath

Bisley /ˈbɪzliː/ is a village and civil parish in the Borough of Surrey Heath in Surrey, England, approximately 25 miles (40 km) southwest of central London. It is midway between Woking (to the east) and Camberley (to the west). The village had a population of 3,965 in the 2011 census.

Much of the west of the parish is covered by an acidic heath, which is used by the Ministry of Defence. The National Shooting Centre, headquarters of the National Rifle Association, is within the historic bounds. Coldingley Men's Prison is also in the village.

The village is close to junction 3 of the M3 motorway. The nearest railway station is at Brookwood, on the South West Main Line.

Bisley is one of 14 parishes in the U.K. to contain a detached portion or exclave.

== History ==
The name 'Bisley' was first recorded in the 10th century as 'Busseleghe'. Its manor was from earliest written records under the feudal lordship of Chertsey Abbey as part of Godley Hundred. It is derived from the old English words 'Bysc', meaning bushes, and 'Leah', a clearing. Therefore, it means clearing where bushes grow or in the bushes. The versions recorded in the 13th century were Busheley and Bussley, from such Westminster and Lambeth Palace rolls as the Assize Rolls.

In medieval times, the village continued to be the southern holding of the Chertsey Abbey estate. The late 12th century church (much of its nave), St John the Baptist, was invested as a proper church in the village by the Abbey monks in the 15th century, who built its mixed brick and timber chancel, since replaced. The church features a medieval bell and a 15th-century porch which is said to have been built from a single oak tree. A nearby spring was once known as the 'Holy Well of St John the Baptist', and was said to have medicinal powers. Its waters were used for local baptisms until the early 20th century. The building is Grade II* listed.

A late Tudor monarch granted the manorial lands and revenues of Woking, Chobham, and Bagshot, having dissolved Chertsey Abbey, to Sir Edward Zouch. Henceforth the descent of Bisley was identical to the other two, and all were by 1911 in the possession of the Earl of Onslow, heirs to many of the lands of the original Earldom of Surrey and Arundel.

Actor Barry Evans attended Bisley boys' school, which was an orphanage run by Shaftesbury Homes.

== Economy ==
=== Coldingley Prison ===
Coldingley Prison – a Category C prison. Several streets were laid out and built-up to house prison officers.

== Amenities ==
=== School and shops ===
The village has Bisley C of E Primary School in the core of the developed part of the village close to its parade of shops, two nursery and a Scout and Guide headquarters. The school's 2013 Ofsted report awarded it a rating of Good.

=== Playing field ===
In the latter half of the 20th century, the Flowers Estate of homes was built, named after flowers of each letter of the alphabet. This adjoins the village's largest playing field. The village football club is the academy and training part of Farnborough Town F.C.

=== National Shooting Centre ===
In 1890, the village became the location for the National Rifle Association's Imperial Meeting (the Association's National Championship), which moved there from Wimbledon. The competition is hosted on the ranges at Bisley Camp having outgrown the Wimbledon Common ranges which had previously been used. The NRA of the UK also moved its headquarters from London to Bisley Camp.

== Sport ==
Bisley is home to Bisley All Stars FC, who are currently a Sunday League club playing in the Surrey & Hants Border League Division 1. They play their home matches at Bisley Recreation Ground. Bisley All Stars currently hold the Isley Cup from their rivals Wisley. It is however highly unlikely it will ever be surrendered given that Wisley F.C. folded at the end of the 2016–17 season.

Despite Bisley All Stars FC finishing the 2017–18 season in 6th place they continue to air their official club song 'Believe' by Cher before and after every game, honouring their 10-year licensing agreement.

Bisley All Stars in their whole club history have never won a penalty shootout.

At the Lord Roberts Centre indoors is a purpose-built Inline Hockey Rink which is used for league and national events by BiSHA and BiPHA.

== Demography and housing ==
2011 Census Homes
Output area	Detached	Semi-detached	Terraced	Flats and apartments	Caravans/temporary/mobile homes	shared between households
(Civil Parish)	676	343	201	89	1	0

The average level of accommodation in the region composed of detached houses was 28%, the average that was apartments was 22.6%.

2011 Census Key Statistics
Output area	Population	Households	% Owned outright	% Owned with a loan	hectares
(Civil Parish)	3,965	1,310	36.3%	51.7%	366

The proportion of households in the civil parish who owned their home outright compares to the regional average of 35.1%. The proportion who owned their home with a loan compares to the regional average of 32.5%. The remaining % is made up of rented dwellings (plus a negligible % of households living rent-free).

== Transport ==
=== Rail ===
The nearest railway station is Brookwood, which has adjoining car parks and fast and slow tracks and a part-non-segregated cycle link. City destinations from Brookwood include Salisbury and Winchester and most popular destination is London.

=== Road ===
The entire parish is bisected by one main road, the A322 road, which develops a dualled status further north where it joins the M3. Its serves as the main link from western Woking to the motorway network and an alternative link for the Guildford area to western destinations.
