= Elcho Shield =

Annual Match Rifle competition

- Sport: Long range Fullbore target rifle
- Competition: The Elcho
- Discipline: Match Rifle
- Awarded for: Winner of Elcho Match
- Location: National Shooting Centre
- Country: United Kingdom
- Presented by: National Rifle Association

History
- First award: 1862
- Editions: 150 (as of 2021 Match)
- First winner: England
- Most recent: England
- Website: gbmatchrifle.org.uk/competitions/elcho/

The Elcho Shield is an annual long range shooting competition between national teams of eight from England, Scotland, Ireland and Wales. The trophy holder was originally able to choose the venue of the competition, however, since the NRA's move to Surrey from Wimbledon in 1890, the competition has been held at National Shooting Centre, Bisley in Surrey, England. It is usually contested during the NRA Imperial Meeting.

The 2021 holder of the trophy is England.

== Course of Fire ==
Each shooter fires fifteen shots at 1,000 yd (910 m), 1,100 yd (1,000 m), and 1,200 yd (1,100 m). Unusually, no "sighting" or practice shots are permitted. The shooters may be coached which allows other team members to judge and make necessary adjustments to the shooter's sights. The rules allow each team two hours at each distance to fire all their shots. The match is most regularly held following the national championships in July each year.

== History ==
The first match, on Wednesday July 9, 1862, was held over 800 yd (730 m), 900 yd (820 m) and 1,000 yd (910 m) solely between Scotland and England. In the event England won by 166 points. Scotland won the trophy for the first time in 1864. As the match was restricted to Volunteers, Ireland was unable to participate - having no Volunteer regiments. After several applications, the NRA permitted the Ulster Rifle Association to send a team and Ireland joined the fray in 1865. Ireland scored their first win in 1873. By this time, the match had become a major sporting event in Victorian England, as important as The Boat Race or the Eton v Harrow cricket match at Lords. Wales did not compete until 1991.

The Elcho Shield is large and distinctive, made from a sheet of iron decorated with repousse scenes to a design by the artist G. F. Watts. It was presented to the National Rifle Association by its founder and president, Lord Elcho.

== See also ==
- International Confederation of Fullbore Rifle Associations (ICFRA), the international sanctioning body for fullbore target rifle
