= Imperial Meeting =

Target shooting competition in the United Kingdom

- Status: Active
- Genre: Sporting event
- Date: July
- Frequency: Annual
- Venue: National Shooting Centre
- Locations: Bisley, Surrey, England
- Country: United Kingdom
- Years active: 166
- Inaugurated: July 1860
- Area: Worldwide
- Organiser: National Rifle Association
- Website: nra.org.uk/imperial

The Imperial Meeting is a target shooting competition organised by the National Rifle Association annually at the Bisley Ranges in England. It is widely regarded as the most prestigious shooting competition in the world.

The Meeting lasts for 3 weeks each July, encompassing inter-service military matches; cadet shooting competitions; the Schools Meeting (culminating in the Ashburton Match); Historic Arms; as well as civilian Match Rifle and Target Rifle competitions. The meeting closes with the Sovereign's Prize.

== History ==
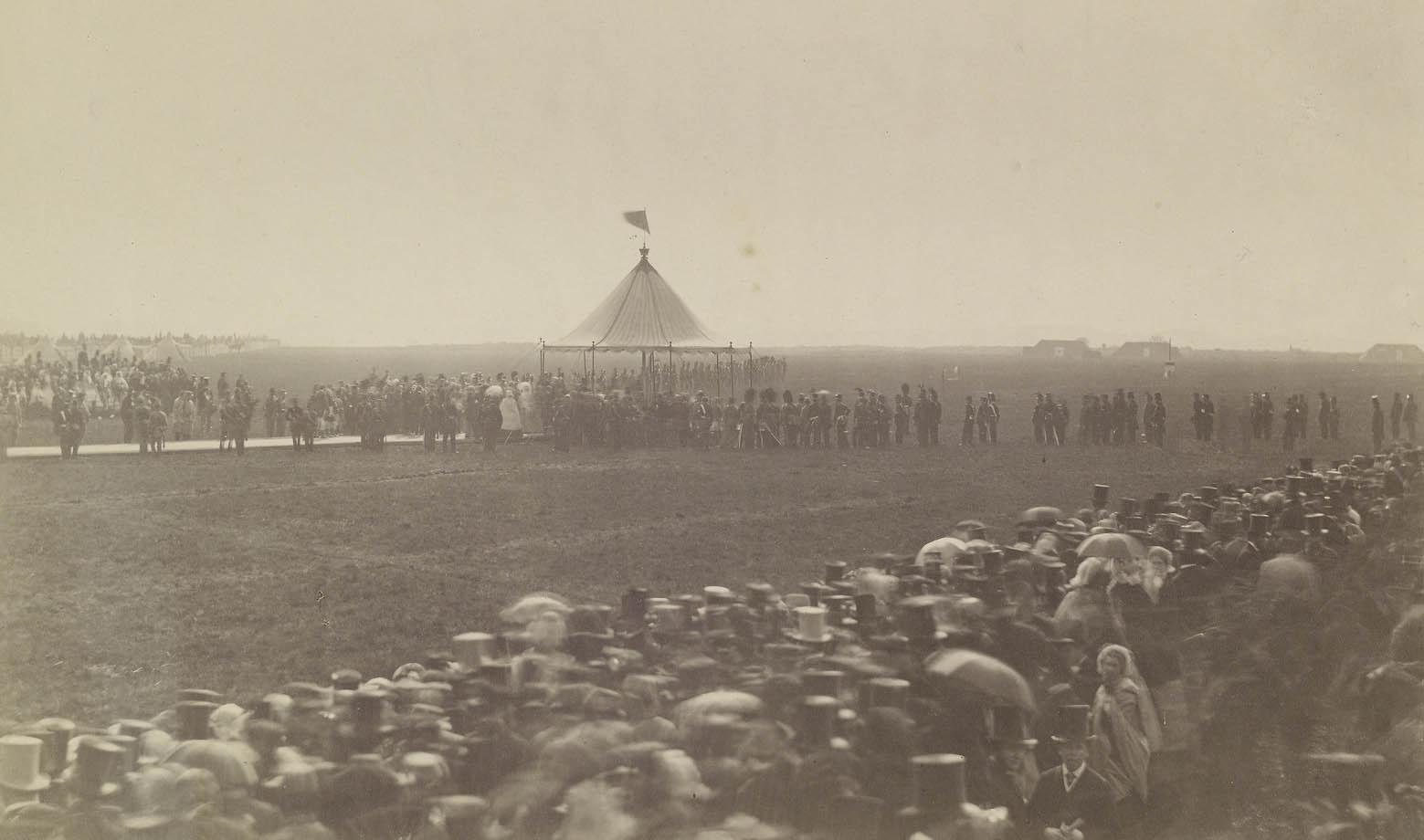
Queen Victoria firing the first shot, Wimbledon 1860

The first Imperial Meeting was contested on Wimbledon Common in 1860. The National Rifle Association had been founded the previous year with the express purpose of running such a competition to improve the standard of marksmanship. Queen Victoria fired the first shot and awarded her "Queen's Prize" of £250 (~£38,000 in 2023) to the best individual marksman. Seventeen-year-old Edward Ross of the 7th North Yorkshire Volunteers was the first winner. The meeting was initially open to members of the Volunteers movement, who would have used the issued service rifle of the day, such as the Snider–Enfield and Martini–Henry.

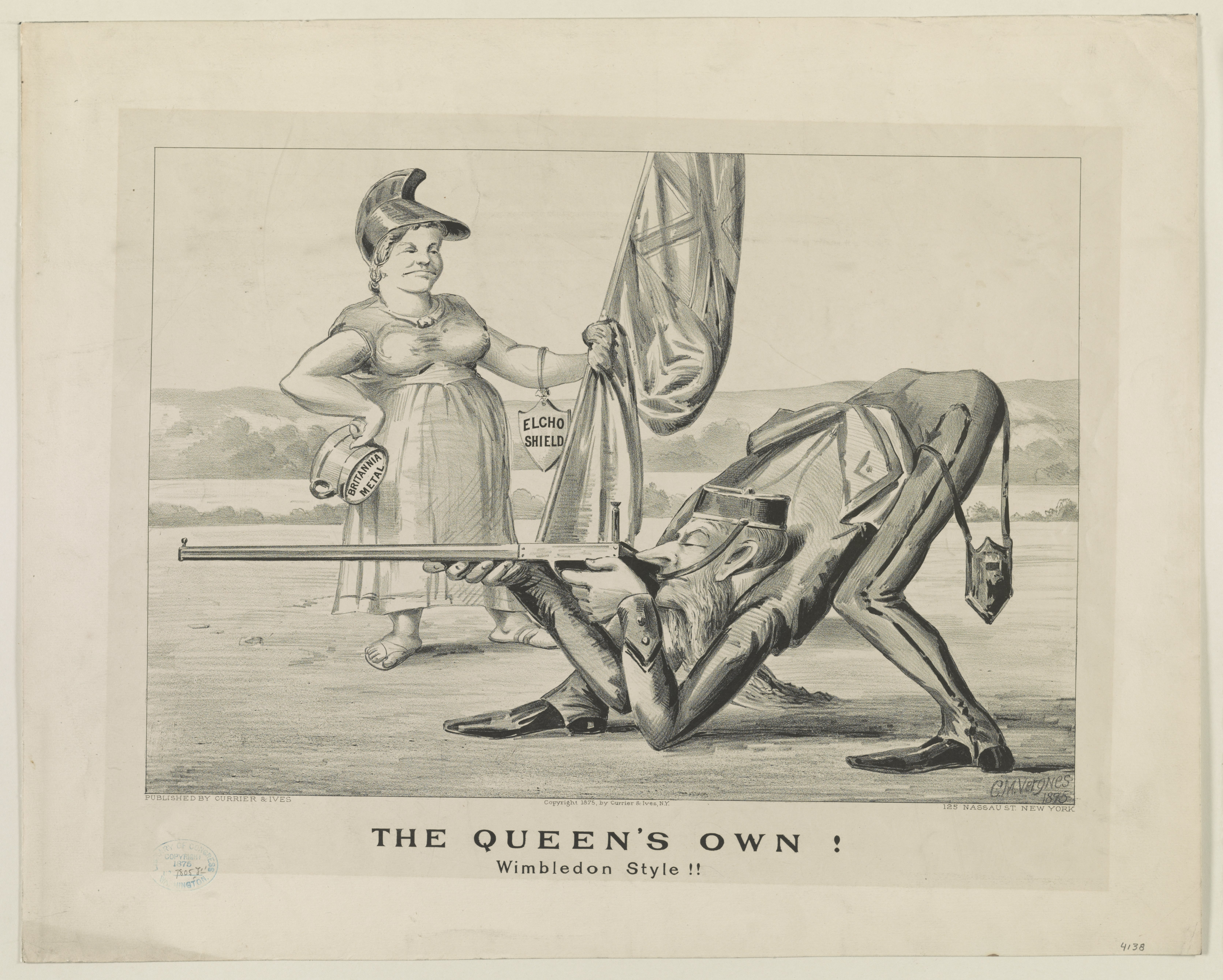
Caricature of an Elcho Shield competitor from a society magazine.

The Imperial Meeting quickly gained significance in high society. In 1878, the society biographer and journalist Edward Walford wrote:

These annual gatherings are attended by the élite of fashion, and always include a large number of ladies, who generally evince the greatest interest in the target practice of the various competitors, whether it be for the honour of carrying off the Elcho Shield, the Queen's or the Prince of Wales's Prize, or the shield shot for by our great Public Schools, or the Annual Rifle Match between the Houses of Lords and Commons.

Key matches such as the Elcho were significant social occasions on par with the Boat Race. Shooters and officials were often household names, and featured or even caricatured in society publications such as Vanity Fair.

The association moved from Wimbledon to Bisley Camp in 1890 after housing development around Wimbledon caused concerns about the ongoing ability to safely operate the ranges.

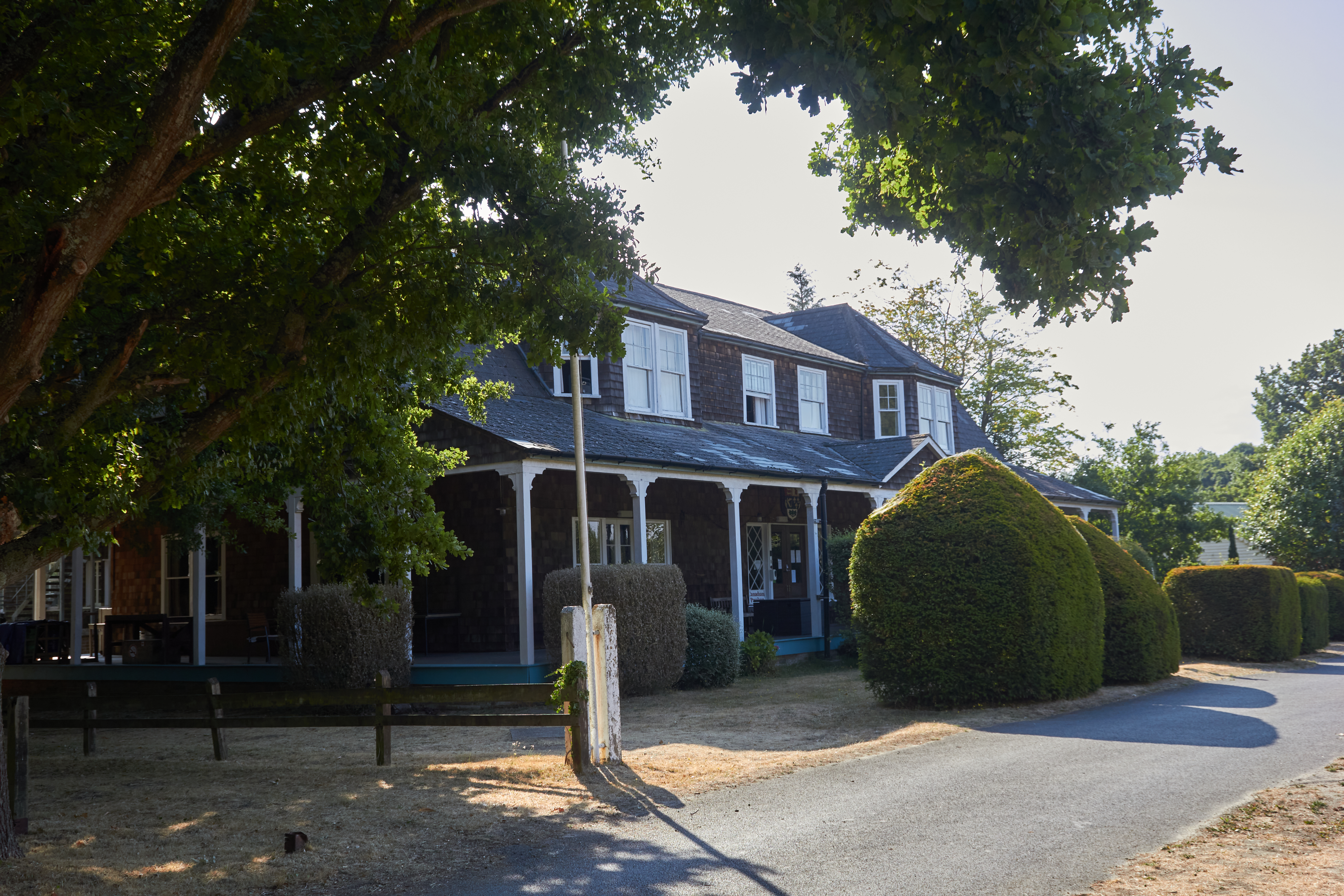
Canada House, National Shooting Centre, England

The NRA and the Imperial Meeting heavily influenced the development of shooting sports around the world, particularly in the British Empire. The formation of the National Rifle Association of Australia was prompted in part by a desire amongst regional associations to send an Australian team to compete at Wimbledon. In 1897 the Dominion of Canada Rifle Association built a pavilion on Bisley Camp to accommodate the Canadian national team whilst competing at the meeting.

In the first half of the twentieth century, the meeting was extensively covered by newsreels including Pathé and Movietone, resulting in an unusually rich heritage of archival footage.

1966 was the last meeting at which the Army provided personnel to mark targets and perform other duties. From 1967, the military operated their own Service competitions, with the Imperial Meeting itself being purely civilian - although many service personnel continued to compete in a private capacity.

The sport became significantly more civilian-oriented through the second half of the twentieth century. Where competitors had typically shot accurised military surplus rifles such as Lee–Enfields, dedicated target rifles such as the Swing were developed, with the Swing becoming the first rifle not of a military design to win the Queen's Prize. The military models were increasingly consigned to specific service rifle and historic arms matches.

In 2019, the NRA celebrated the 150th Imperial Meeting (this was 159 years since 1860, as a result of the Meeting's cancellation during the World Wars).

Due to the COVID-19 pandemic, the 2020 meeting was postponed. However, wishing to keep intact the record of only being interrupted by two World Wars, a "miniature Imperial" was held in stages through September and October. This included the Queen's Prize, which featured a reduced number of finalists qualifying to allow wider spacing on the firing point for social distancing.

== Programme ==
The Imperial Meeting officially takes place during two weeks of July, although there is a build-up of other events including inter-services matches through late June, not all of which are run by the NRA.

Typical Imperial Meeting Programme
Pre-Imperial			Week 1							"Middle Weekend"		Week 2					
W	T	F	Sa	Su	M	T	W	T	F	Sa	Su	M	T	W	T	F	Sa
F-Class																	
			Historic Arms														
		Match Rifle															
					Schools												
								Gallery Rifle									
			Sporting Rifle														
									Target Rifle								
									Pre-Grand			Grand Aggregate				King's Prize	

=== Match Rifle Imperial ===
The match rifle meeting is conducted at ranges between 1000 and 1200 yards during the first week. Match rifle is a less restricted form of target rifle, permitting the use of telescopic sights and other advancements. Competitors may shoot prone or supine (lying on their back). The Elcho Shield is contested on the penultimate day (usually First Wednesday), followed by the Humphry match between Oxford and Cambridge universities on the final day.

=== Schools Imperial ===
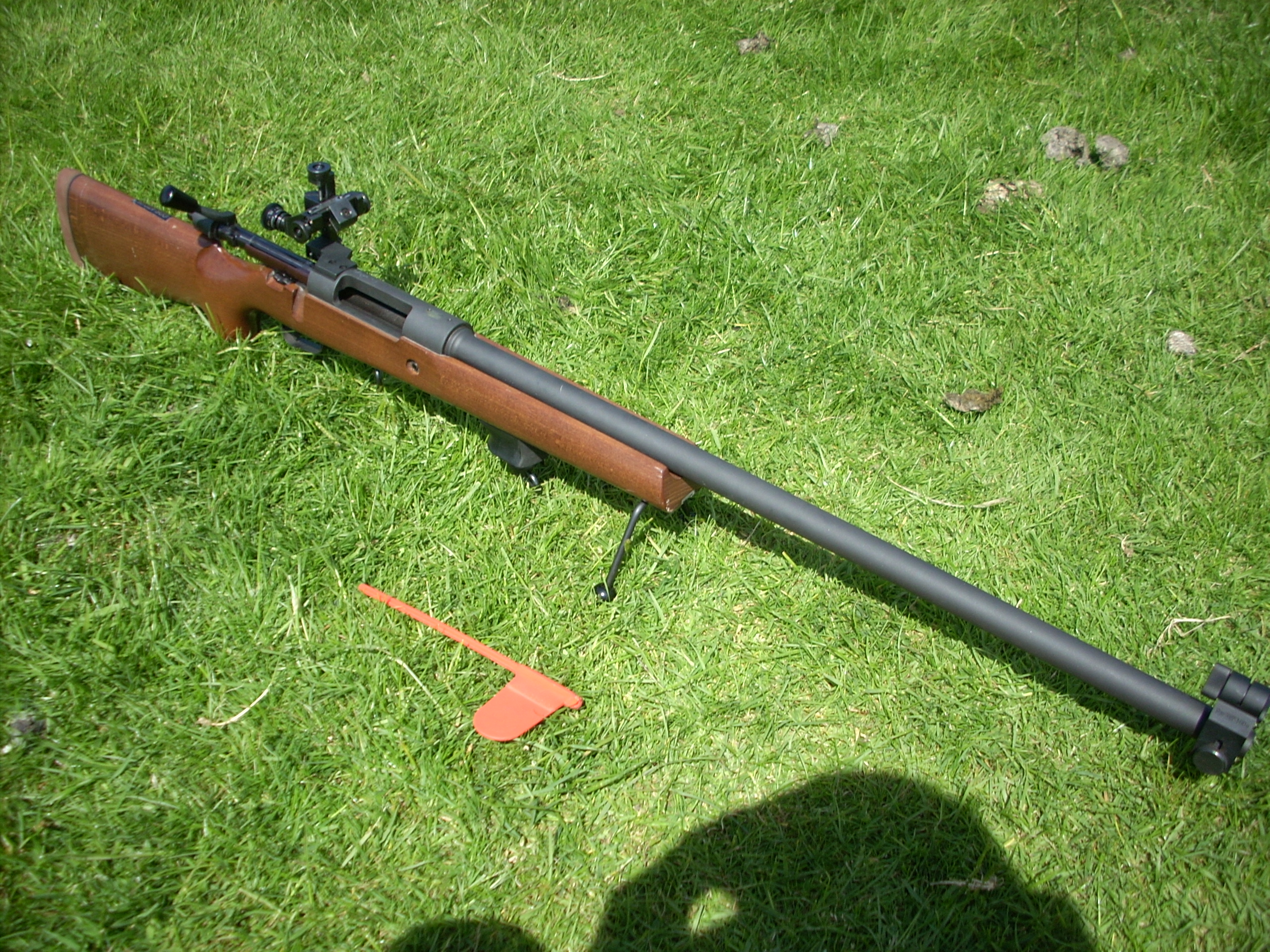
Parker Hale L81 A2 Cadet Target Rifle

The Schools Imperial (or Schools Meeting) was contested during Week 1 by school-based Combined Cadet Forces, using the L81 Cadet Target Rifle (not the SA80-derived L98 Cadet Rifle). It culminated in the Ashburton Shield Match.

With the decommissioning of the L81A2 Cadet Target Rifle (CTR), effective 1 January 2026, and removal of fullbore shooting as a recognised cadet activity the Inter Services Cadet Rifle Meeting (ISCRM) and the Combined Cadet Forces (CCF) Schools’ Meeting ceased.

=== Target Rifle Imperial ===
The discipline of target rifle attracts the largest entry of the meeting. The Target Rifle Imperial runs for nine days through Middle Weekend and Week 2, and is attended by international teams from around the world, with a particular emphasis on Commonwealth nations.

Individual competitors have three main blocks of competition -

- The "Pre-Grand" - an aggregate of matches shot over middle weekend.
- Grand Aggregate - an aggregate shot second Monday to second Thursday
- Sovereign's Prize - contested at the end of Week 2, with the Final on the last day (Saturday).

There are a number of significant team matches, including:

- The Mackinnon - International Teams of 12 firers (1+10 at 900 & 1000yards). British shooters compete for either England, Scotland, Wales or Ireland
- The Kolapore - International Teams of 8 firers (1+10 at 300, 500 & 600yards). British shooters compete as Great Britain
- The National Trophy - Teams of 20 firers from the Home Nations (2+7 at 300, 500 & 600yards).
- The Vizianagram - Teams from the House of Commons and House of Lords (2+10 at 500 & 600yards).

== Trophies and prize money ==
The NRA awards a number of trophies over the course of the meeting, including examples donated from across the former British Empire.

== See also ==
- Bisley – The Queen's Prize – a BBC film following the 1986 Imperial Meeting and Queen's Prize, presented by Brian Glover.
- ICFRA World Championships – Including the Palma Match
