= National Shooting Centre =

Target shooting centre in Bisley, UK

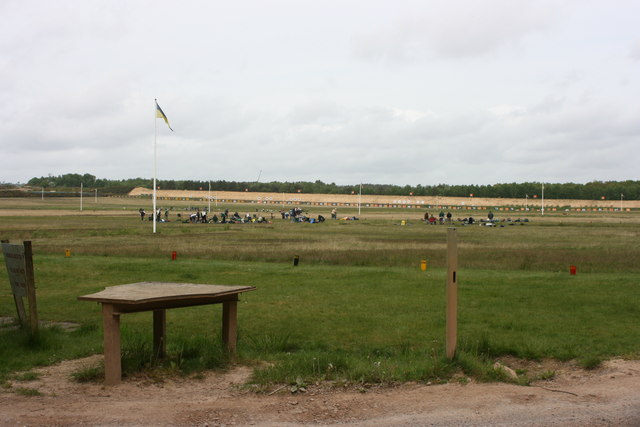
- Century Range at the NSC
- Interactive map of National Shooting Centre
- Location: Brookwood, Surrey, England
- Coordinates: 51.3113°N 0.6554°W
- Owner: National Rifle Association
- Type: Shooting range
- Public transit: Brookwood

Construction
- Opened: 1890
- Renovated: 2002 Commonwealth Games

Website
- www.nationalshootingcentre.co.uk

The National Shooting Centre, commonly referred to as Bisley, is the UK's largest shooting sports complex, comprising several shooting ranges as well as the large Bisley Camp complex of accommodation, clubhouses and support services. The centre is located between the villages of Bisley (from which it takes it colloquial name) and Brookwood in Surrey. The site is wholly owned by the National Rifle Association (NRA).

== History ==
The NRA Imperial Meeting (the Association's national championship) was first held on Wimbledon Common in 1860. In 1890, the village of Bisley became the location for the Imperial Meeting. The headquarters of the British NRA was also moved from Wimbledon to Bisley Camp at that time.

Bisley hosted most of the shooting events in the 1908 Olympic Games, and all the shooting for the 2002 Commonwealth Games. During the 2012 Olympic Games the shooting was held at the Royal Artillery Barracks, Woolwich.

As well as the rifle ranges, there are two clay target shooting complexes; The National Clay Shooting Centre, which caters for trap disciplines such as skeet and down-the-line, and Bisley Shooting Ground, which caters for sporting clays, or simulated game shooting.

Bisley is famous within shooting circles and has been described as the "marksman's Mecca". Some of the buildings within the grounds are from the Victorian era, having been transported there in the re-location from Wimbledon Common. These were previously erected annually at Wimbledon, but were sited permanently from 1890 onwards. The clock tower, Fulton's Gun Shop and the Exhibition Pavilion are particularly fine examples which survive to this day. The site's architecture has been noted in Pevsner's Buildings of England, with buildings used as filming locations in period works and doubling as North American locations. The Camp has been described as "blend[ing] elements reminiscent of a colonial outpost, a museum of cricket pavilions, and a recreational holiday camp." Several buildings on the site are listed, including the Macdonald Stewart Pavilion and the large prefabricated wooden structure housing Fulton's. Better known as "Canada House", the Pavilion was constructed in 1897 by the Dominion of Canada Rifle Association as a home-away-from-home for the Canadian national team when they attended the Imperial Meeting.

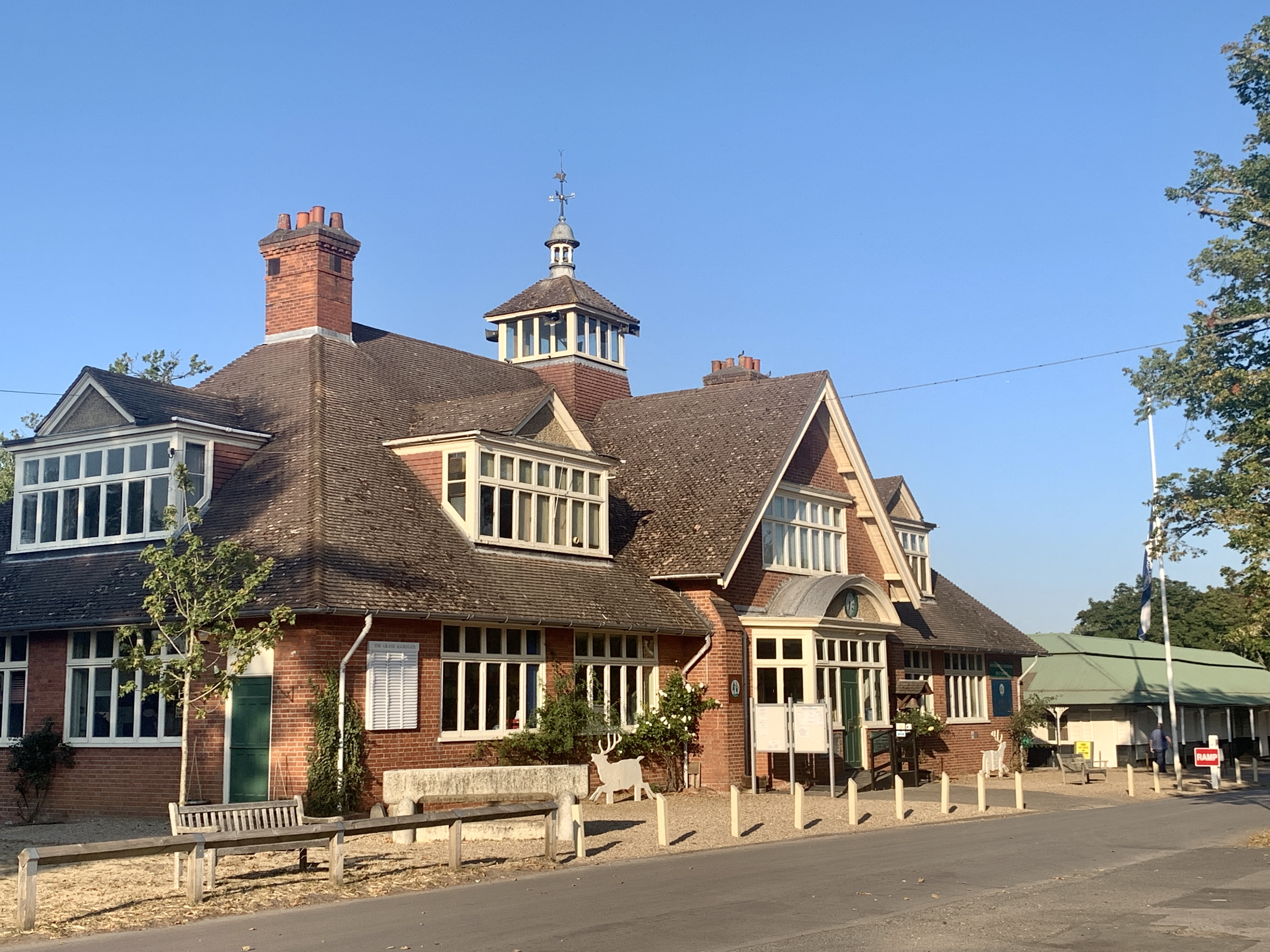
NRA headquarters

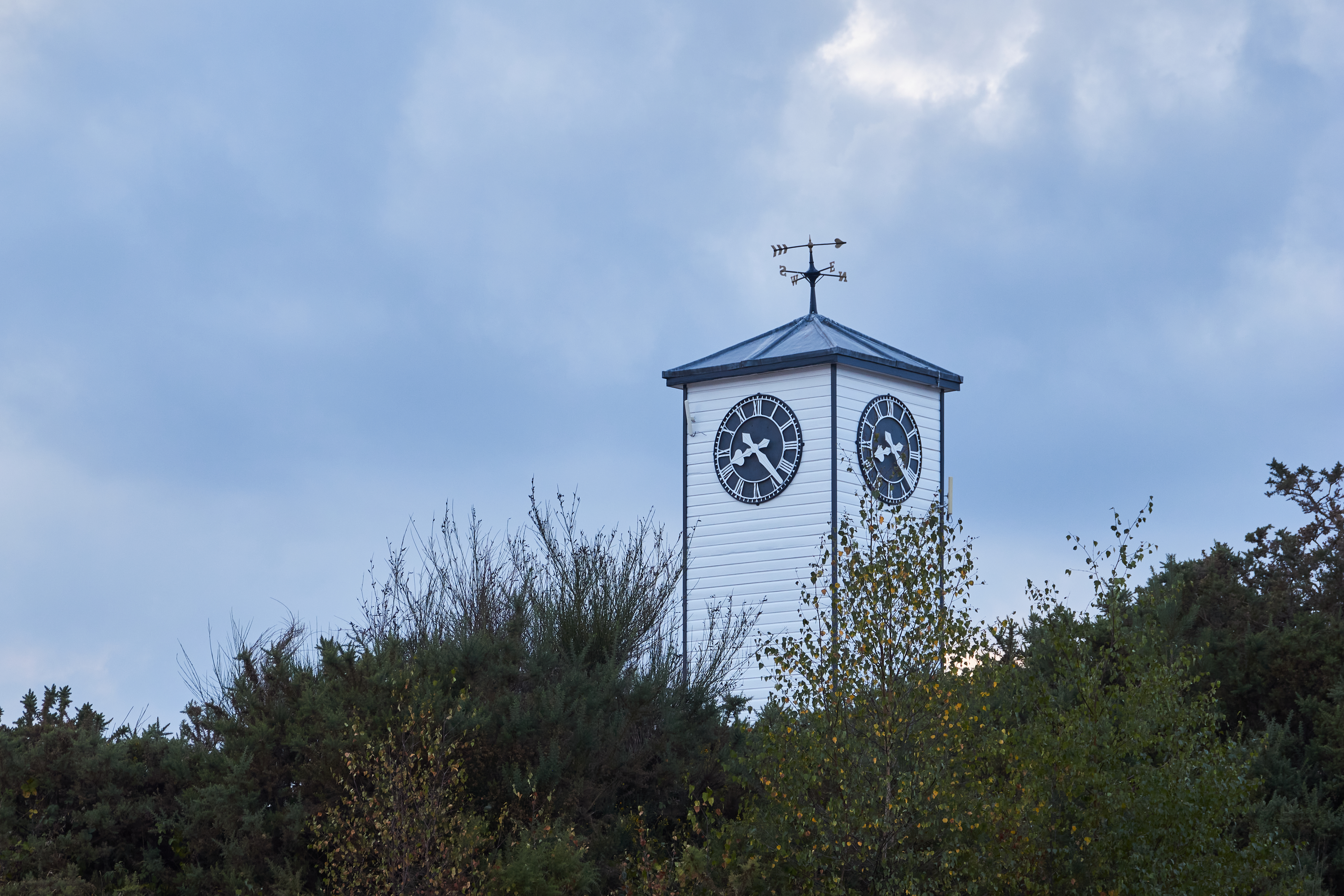
Bisley clock tower

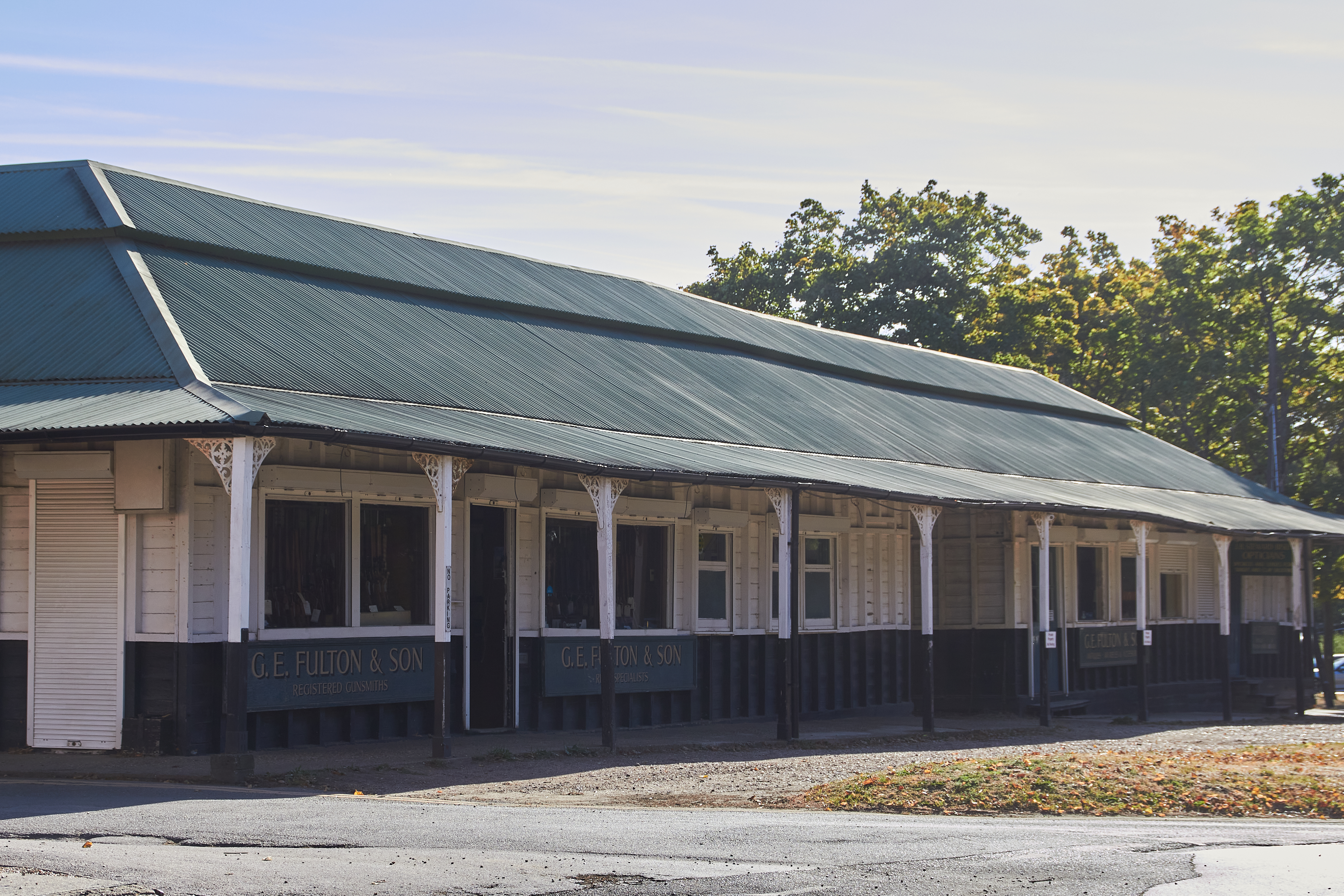
Fulton's Gun Shop

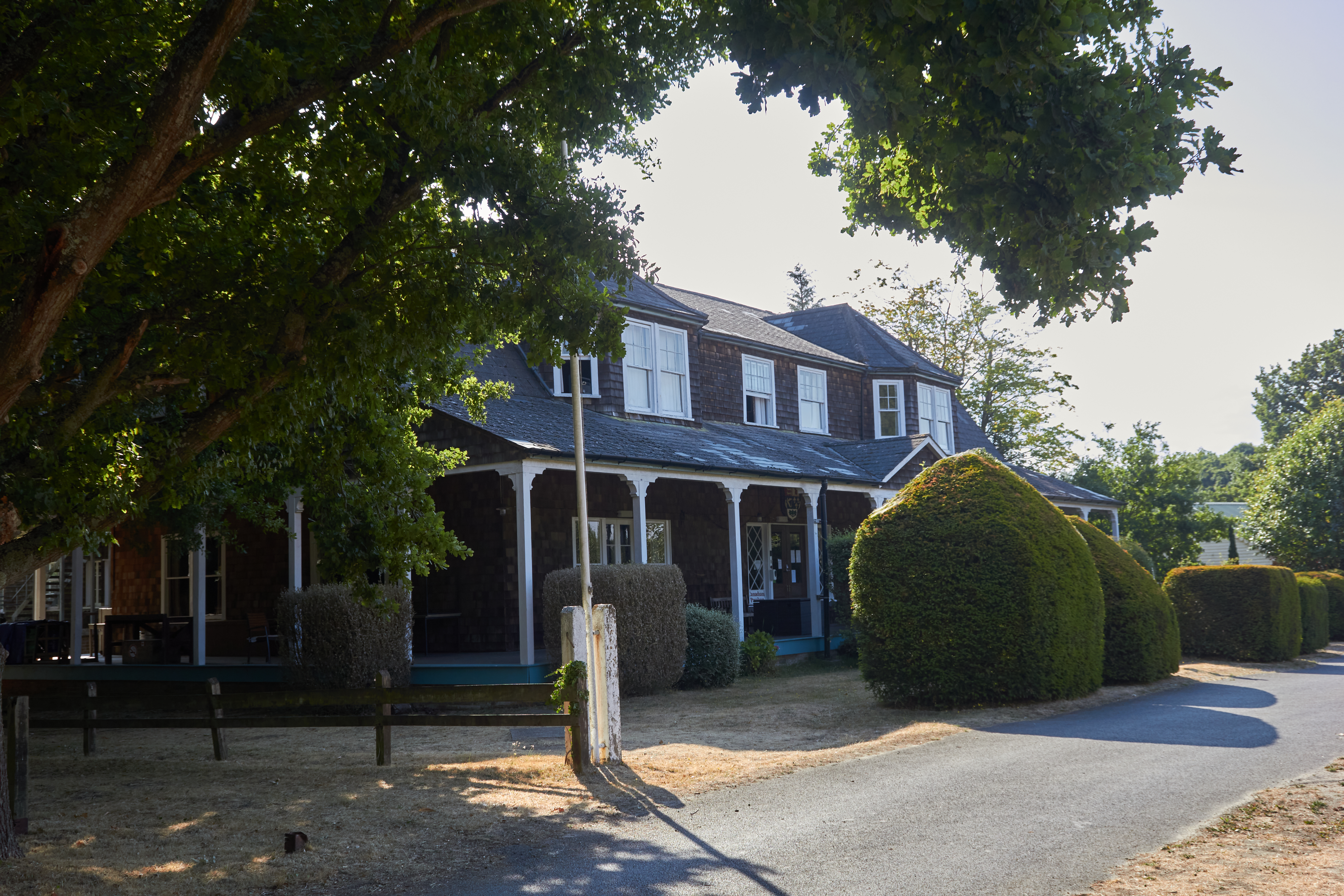
Macdonald–Stewart Pavilion (Canada House)

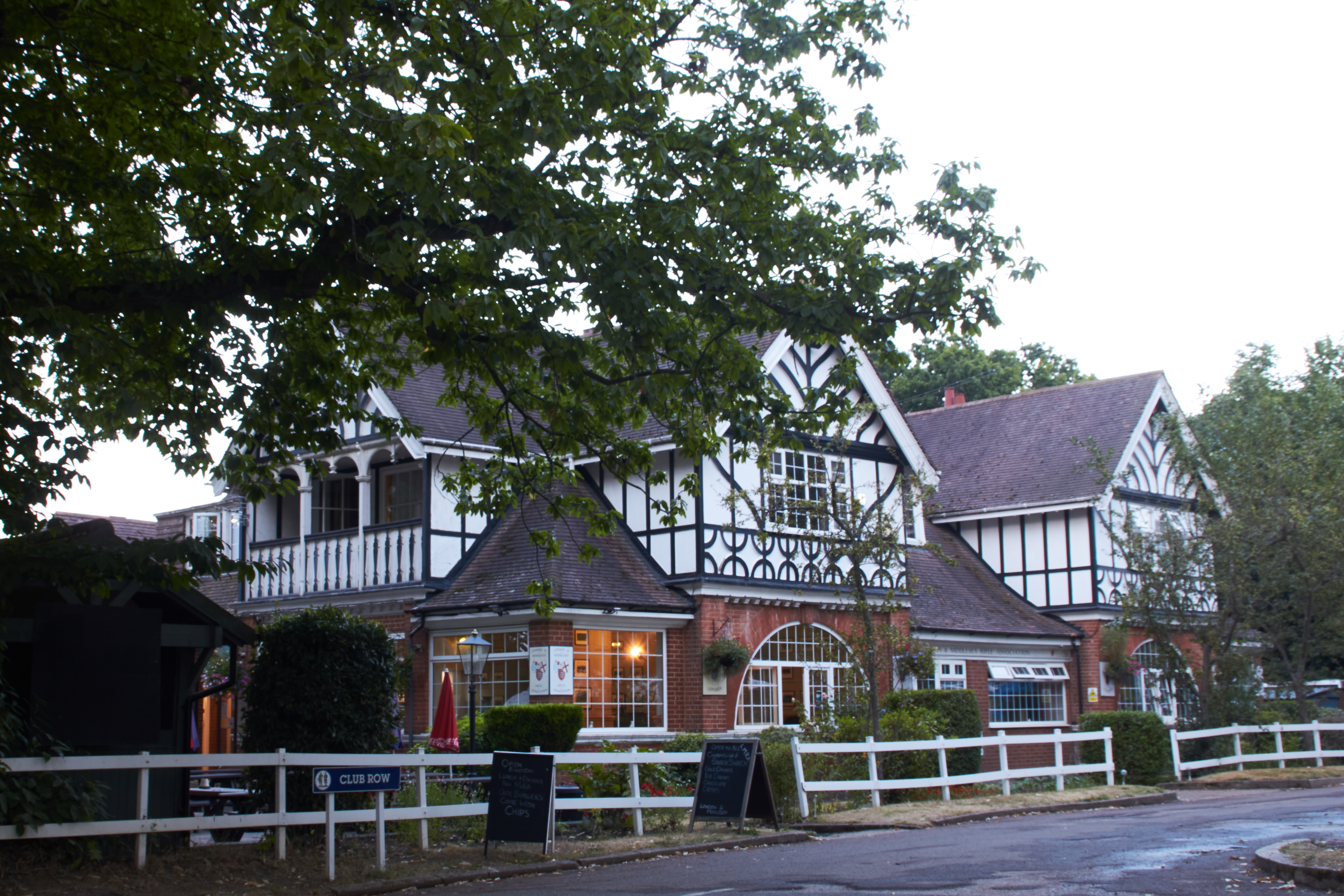
London and Middlesex Rifle Association

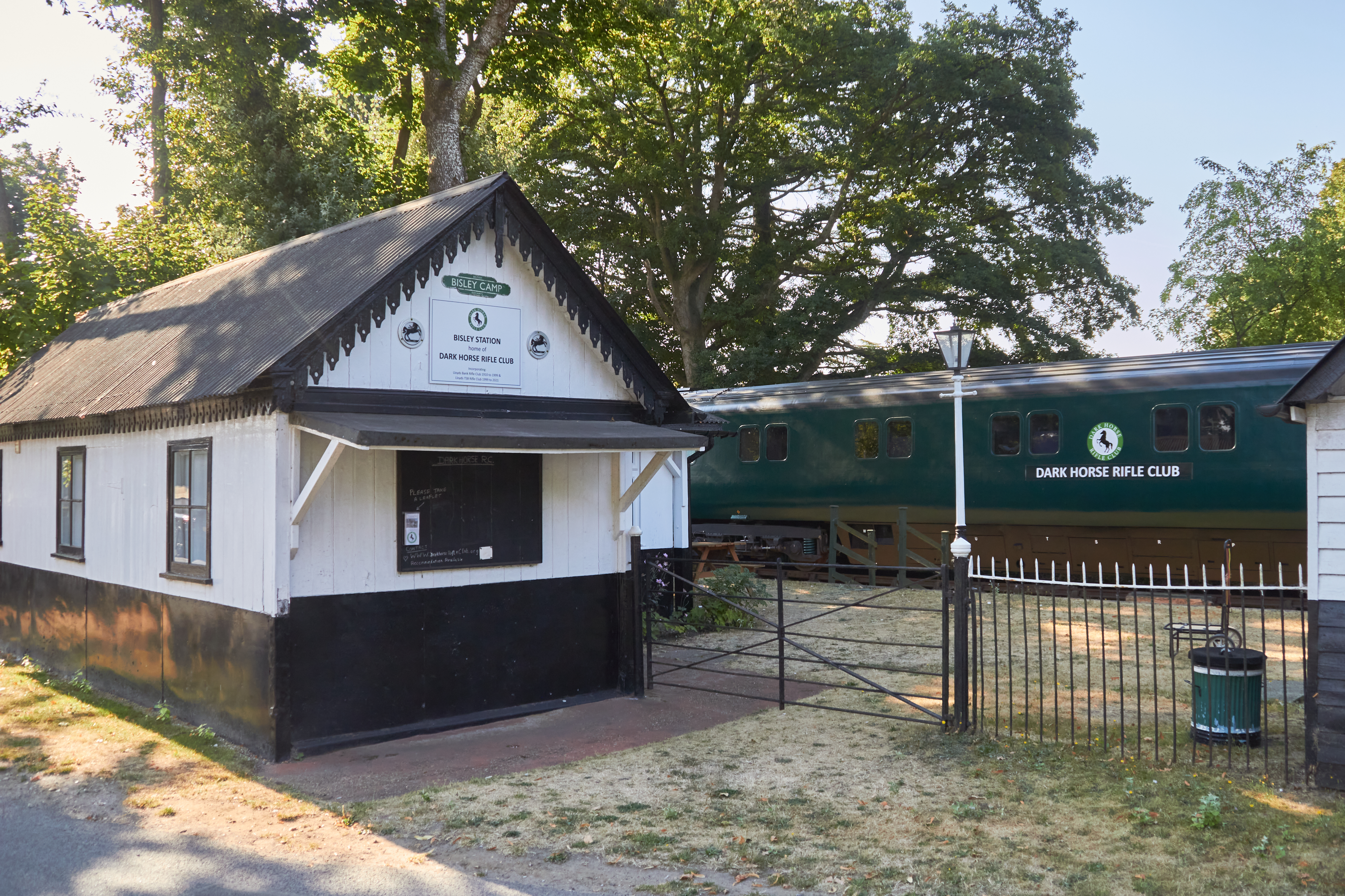
The former Bisley Camp station, now Dark Horse Rifle Club. Accommodation is provided in the sleeper carriage

The camp originally had its own railway branch line which ran from nearby Brookwood station, and was known as the "Bisley Bullet". Services operated for just two weeks a year to support the Imperial Meeting. During the First World War, the line was extended to Pirbright, Deepcut and Blackdown Camps by the War Office. In 1918 is passed into the control of the London & South Western Railway. The Bisley branch was requisitioned again by the military during the Second World War. The extension was dismantled in 1950 and the last train to Bisley ran on 19 July 1952.

In 1894 Colt, the US firearms manufacturer, introduced and sold the Bisley Model of its famous Single Action Army revolver specifically designed for target shooting. This revolver featured a longer grip, a wider hammer spur, a wider trigger and adjustable sights. It was offered in a variety of calibres including .32–20, .38–40, .45 Colt, .44-40.

=== 1990s–present ===
Through the 1990s and 2000s, the condition of the camp declined due to financial difficulties at the NRA. The 2002 Commonwealth Games saw some capital investment to the sports facilities, including the construction of the National Clay Shooting Centre. However, other facilities including the accommodation and camping ablutions declined, with the NRA making significant redundancies in 2011 and 2012.

In 2013, new management within the NRA saw a wholesale change in approach to estate management and a new focus on housekeeping the ablutions and catching up with overdue site maintenance. Many derelict static caravans were evicted from pitches where they had been allowed to stand in arrears, and new stands of "serviced" cabins were constructed, providing mains electricity and plumbing - existing caravans had no utility hookups. Controversially, clubhouse leases were also updated to include the value of the buildings, increasing the leasehold significantly. Since 1890, clubs had paid a ground rent and had built their own clubhouses on the site, but in 2013 the NRA took the view that the landlord (the NRA) – not the tenant – owned the building, with lease renewals reflecting this. Several clubs surrendered their clubhouses, unable to afford the new rates. The tenant of the Artists Rifles Clubhouse fought a high-profile battle in the media, having rejected the outcome of arbitration. It was eventually established that the NRA did own the building, although improvements made by the tenant were to be accounted for in setting the rent. This episode was misreported in national press as involving the "Regimental Clubhouse" of the Artists Rifles Regiment, but the Artists Rifle Club had in fact vacated the building in 1967. The tenant was not connected with the SAS, Artists Rifle Club or the Regimental Association.

The NSC is also the location of Army Operational Shooting Competition, in which members of the British army compete for the King's Medal.

== Ranges ==
The National Shooting Centre has a number of ranges to cater for differing firearms and shooting disciplines.

=== Short Siberia ===
Short Siberia is situated furthest away from the main Camp area on the far side of Century Range. It is a rifle range with twenty-seven 100-yard (91 m) targets and nine 200-yard (180 m) targets.

=== Century Range ===
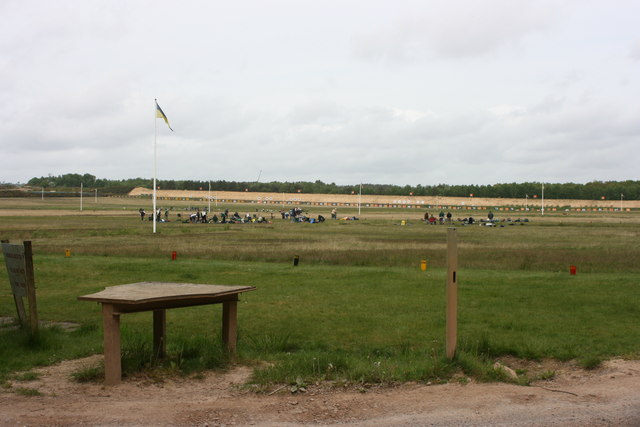
Century Range from the 600 yard firing point with shooters firing at 500 yards

Century Range was the first range built at Bisley when the NRA moved to the site in 1890. It has 108 targets and firing points at distances between 100 and 600 yards (91 and 549 m). Century Range also has facilities for the 300 m discipline and has several butts of electronic targets.

=== Stickledown Range ===
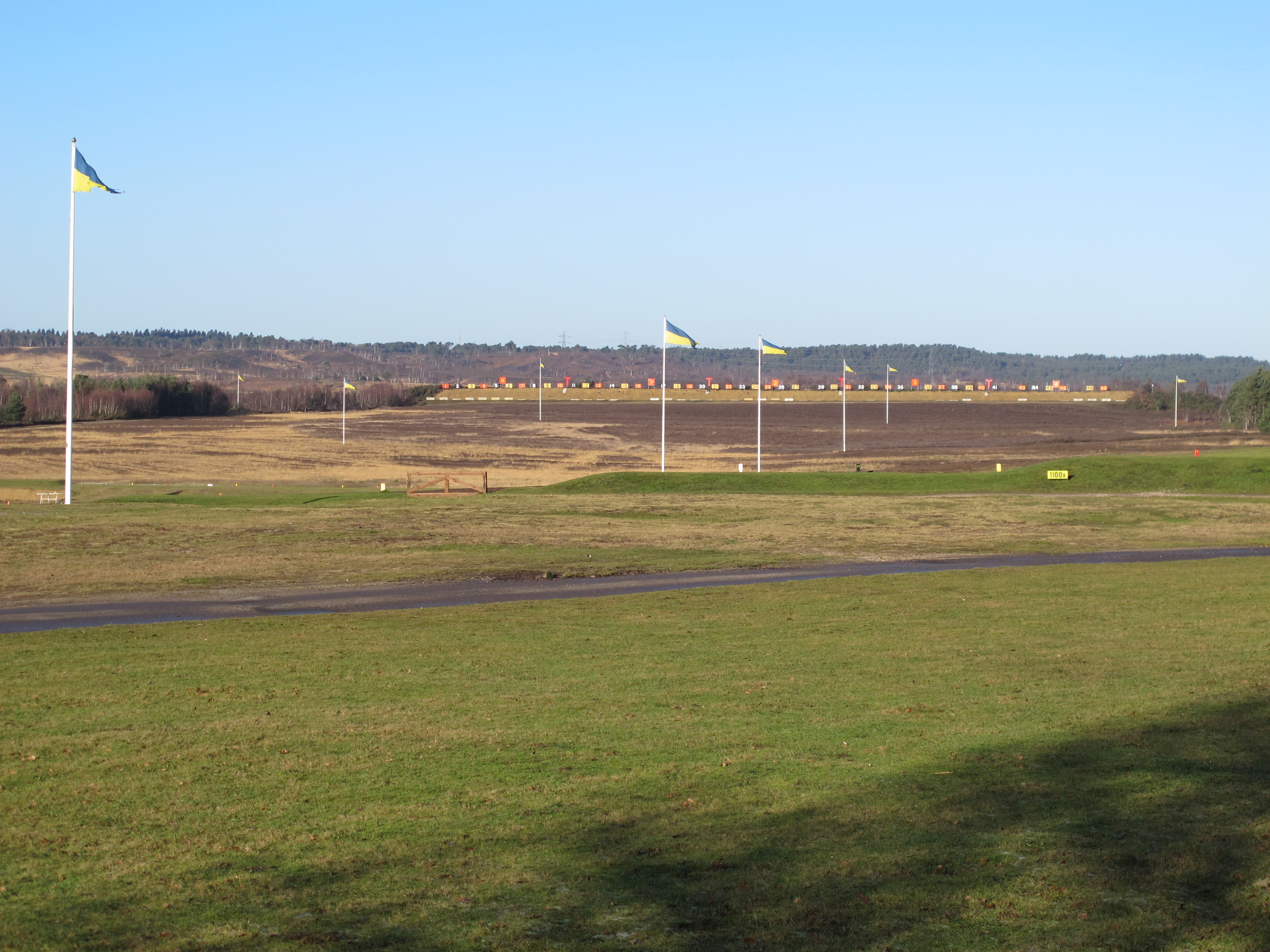
Stickledown Range from the 1200 yard firing point

The longest range on the Bisley Complex, Stickledown is a Gallery Range with 50 targets to be shot at distances from 800 to 1,200 yards (730 to 1,100 metres). Stickledown is also the home of the Bisley Buffalo. Following successful trials in the Spring of 2017, the NRA purchased 11 electronic targets for installation on Stickledown.

=== The Bisley Buffalo ===
The NRA has installed a steel silhouette of a buffalo on its Stickledown range, allowing Bisley shooters the chance to use a reactive target at long range for the first time. "Target 51" on Stickledown consists of a 2.4-by-1.7-metre (7.9 ft × 5.6 ft) steel buffalo silhouette, painted white. It is available from 800, 900 and 1,000 yards (730, 820 and 910 metres) and was installed after consultation with the Single Shot Black Powder Cartridge Rifle Club of Great Britain. Any rifle that fits within the existing Stickledown range restrictions may be used to engage the buffalo.

=== Zero range ===
This range is 71 ft 7 in (21.82 m) long and is available for fullbore rifle prone shooting only. This range is only available to shooters who are also booked to use another range, as it is intended solely for the safe zeroing of a rifle prior to use. This range has three prone only bays, and one benched bay.

=== Winans range ===
Situated next to the zero range, Winans is a no-danger-area (NDA) range divided into two independent bays. Bay A offers 10 turning targets out to 25 metres (82 feet). Bay B offers 6 static targets out to 25 metres (82 feet) and contains a high-velocity canopy and rubber granulate trap. Both bays are suitable for gallery rifle and pistol shooting as well as shotgun slug.

=== Melville range ===
Melville range has a total of five bays. One bay contains seven targets with retrievable mechanisms out to 50 metres (55 yards). Four bays offer gallery rifle and pistol turning targets at 25 and 50 metres (27 and 55 yards). Gallery rifles and pistols only can be shot on this range. Prone .22 calibre rifles can be shot by special arrangement.

=== Cheylesmore range ===
Cheylesmore range is a 25-metre (27 yd) no-danger-area range for gallery rifles and pistols.

== Range restrictions ==
=== Rifle restrictions ===
A maximum muzzle velocity of 1,000 metres per second (3,300 ft/s), a maximum muzzle energy of 4500 J (3319 ft lb).

=== Gallery rifle and pistol restrictions ===
A maximum muzzle velocity of 655 metres per second (2,150 ft/s), a maximum muzzle energy of 2030J (1496 ft lb).

=== High muzzle energy firearms restrictions ===
A maximum muzzle velocity of 1,000 metres per second (3,300 ft/s), a maximum muzzle energy of 7000 J (5160 ft lb). For these there are additional zeroing procedures.

== In popular culture ==
The "famous Century Range at Bisley" is used in target practice by James Bond in Ian Fleming's short story "The Living Daylights" (1962).
