= A. P. Humphry =

English rifle shooter (1850–1916)

Alfred Paget Humphry MVO
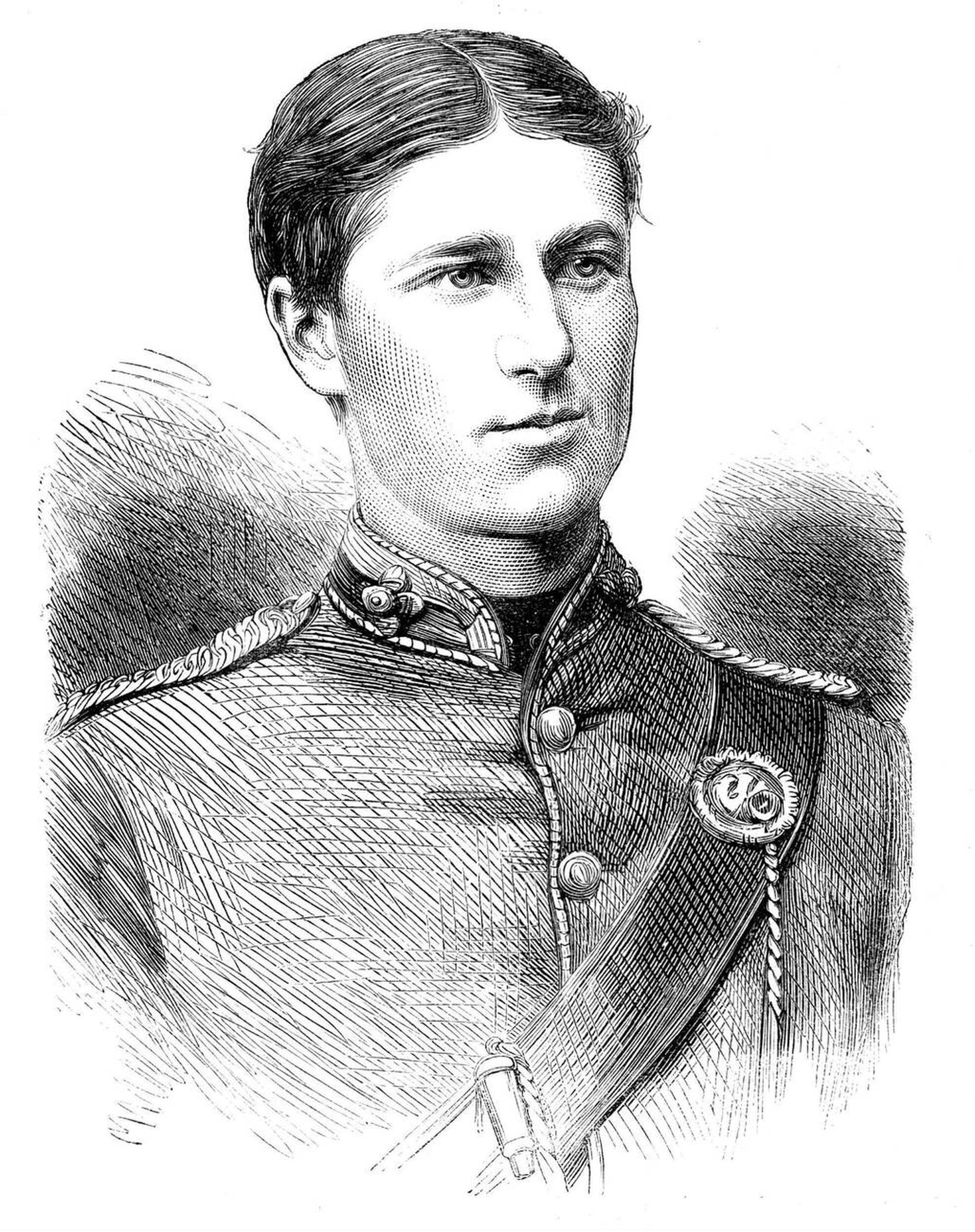
- Drawn from a photograph for the Illustrated London News in 1871

Personal information
- National team: England; Great Britain
- Born: 20 June 1850 Cambridge, England
- Died: 6 October 1916 (aged 66)
- Education: Rugby School; Trinity College, Cambridge
- Occupation: Barrister
- Father: George Murray Humphry
- Military career
- Service: Volunteer Force
- Rank: Colonel
- Units: Cambridge University Rifle Volunteers; 23rd Middlesex (Inns of Court) Rifle Volunteer Corps; 4th (Cambridge University) Volunteer Battalion, The Suffolk Regiment
Sporting achievements
Fullbore rifle shooting
National Rifle Association Meeting
Gold medal – first place	1871	H. M. The Queen's Prize
Silver medal – second place	1875	The Grand Aggregate
Gold medal – first place	1878	The Grand Aggregate

Alfred Paget Humphry MVO (20 June 1850 – 6 October 1916) was an English marksman and lawyer. He was born in Cambridge to George Murray Humphry, a surgeon at the city's Addenbrooke's Hospital. At Rugby School he competed in target rifle shooting, and set the record for an individual score in the match for the Ashburton Shield contested between the public schools. He continued to shoot as an undergraduate at Trinity College, Cambridge, where he was a member of the Cambridge University Rifle Volunteers (CURV). In 1871, during his second year of study, he won the Queen's Prize, the premier contest of the annual meeting of the British National Rifle Association (NRA), then held on Wimbledon Common.

Humphry went on to win several other prizes at Wimbledon, including the Grand Aggregate, the overall ranking of the competitors at the meeting, in 1878. That year, he set a record for the most individual prizes won in a single Wimbledon meeting. He toured twice to the United States with teams representing Great Britain, both captained by Sir Henry Halford, and top-scored at 1,000 yards (910 m) in the British victory of 1882. He also competed for England in the match rifle contest for the Elcho Shield, including two victories in 1872 and 1888. In 1897, upon the death of Halford, The Times wrote that Humphry could claim to have been the best all-round shooter of his generation.

Humphry practised as a barrister, and was called to the bar at Lincoln's Inn of Court in 1875. He became a leading member of the governing council of the NRA, its executive officer in 1881, and its secretary in 1889. He held the ceremonial and administrative position of Senior Esquire Bedell at Cambridge University from 1877 until his resignation in 1913, and several official positions in the town of Cambridge. As an officer in the Volunteer Force, he rose to the rank of colonel and was commanding officer of the CURV from 1886 to 1889. Between 1900 and 1905, he was a member of the War Office Small Arms Committee, which advised the British government on military firearms. He also published books and articles on rifle shooting, the history of the NRA, and Horham Hall, a stately home near Thaxted in Essex he purchased in 1905.

== Early life and education ==
Alfred Paget Humphry was born in Cambridge on 20 June 1850, the son of George Murray Humphry, a prominent surgeon at the city's Addenbrooke's Hospital, and his wife Mary (née McNab). He was educated at Rugby School, a public school in Warwickshire. At Rugby, he shot three times in the annual match for the Ashburton Shield, contested between the public schools of the United Kingdom; he scored the highest of any competitor in 1868. He subsequently studied at Trinity College, Cambridge.

== Rifle shooting career ==
At Cambridge, Humphry shot for the university against Oxford in the short-range Chancellors' Plate each year between 1870 and 1873; the team won twice, in 1870 and 1872, and lost in 1871 and 1874. (Note: In the 1870s, the Chancellors' was contested at the ranges of 200, 500 and 600 yards (180, 460 and 550 metres).) In 1871, as an ensign in F Company of the Cambridge University Rifle Volunteers (CURV) and a second-year undergraduate, he won the Queen's Prize. The Queen's was the premier competition in target rifle shooting in the British Empire, contested as part of the British National Rifle Association's annual meeting then held on Wimbledon Common. His score in the final, contested at the ranges of 800, 900 and 1,000 yards (730, 820 and 910 metres), was 68 out of a possible 84 points. In the same meeting as his Queen's victory, he was part of the victorious Cambridgeshire team in the inter-county China Cup.

In 1875 Humphry placed second in the Grand Aggregate, the overall ranking of the competitors at the Wimbledon Meeting, thereby winning the Silver Cross of the National Rifle Association (NRA). In 1878 he won the Grand Aggregate outright, thereby winning the NRA's Gold Cross. He also won several individual competitions of the association's annual meeting, including two wins each in the Duke of Cambridge (1877 and 1880) and the Curtis and Harvey (1878 and 1880). Apart from his 1871 victory, he qualified three times (in 1872, 1885 and 1877) for the final stage of the Queen's Prize. His performance at the 1878 meeting won him more prizes than any other competitor, either at that meeting or any previous NRA meeting.

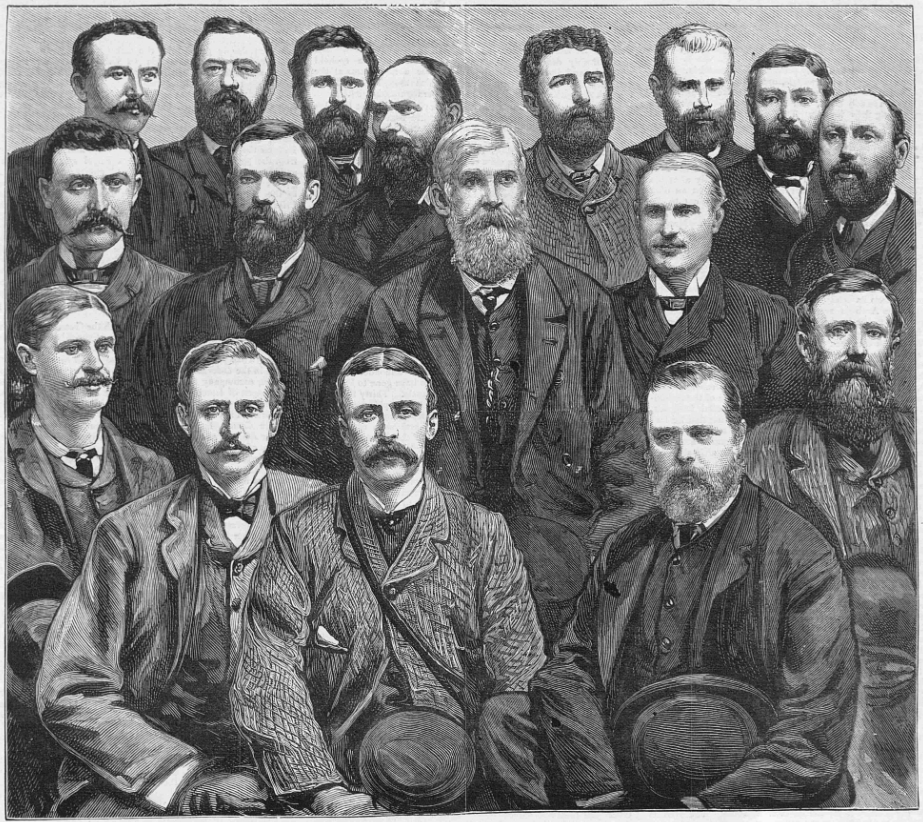
The Great Britain rifle team that toured to the United States in 1882, as depicted in The Graphic. Humphry is in the front row at far left.

In 1877, as a private in the 23rd Middlesex (Inns of Court) Rifle Volunteer Corps, Humphry was part of the touring British team that visited Creedmoor Rifle Range in New York. The British team, led by Sir Henry Halford, were defeated by the United States by 92 out of 2,000 points. In 1882, by then a major, he returned to Creedmoor, again under Halford, with another Great Britain team. Great Britain won the international match against the United States, and Humphry made the top score of all competitors at 1,000 yards (910 m) – an achievement which the American shooter Henry Gildersleeve jokingly attributed to the presence at Creedmoor of Humphry's wife, Elizabeth, who loaded his cartridges for him. (Note: Cornfield 1987, p. 70. For the name of Humphry's wife, see Burke's Peerage 1921, p. 948.)

Humphry was a member, alongside Halford, of the victorious England match rifle teams in 1872 and 1888 matches for the Elcho Shield: his score of 184 in 1888 was the team's lowest. He also shot for England in 1877, when the team placed second behind Ireland. In 1881, Humphry presented a cup to be given as the prize for the long-range match between the universities of Oxford and Cambridge, which had been conducted since 1869 and was shot at Wimbledon for the first time in 1880. The match has been named for him since. (Note: In its original iteration, the Humphry was contested at the ranges of 800, 900 and 1,000 yards (730, 820 and 910 metres) and could be fired with any rifle of no greater than .315 calibre. From 1897, the match changed to match rifle.)

In 1897, upon the death of Halford, The Times suggested that Humphry could claim, in the same way as Horatio Ross and George Charles Gibbs, to have been the best all-round shooter of his generation. By 1899, he had retired from both shooting and military service. In a 1913 volume on sport at British schools and universities, Robert Lyttelton wrote that Humphry was "one of the most famous rifle shots of the world".

== Personal and professional life ==
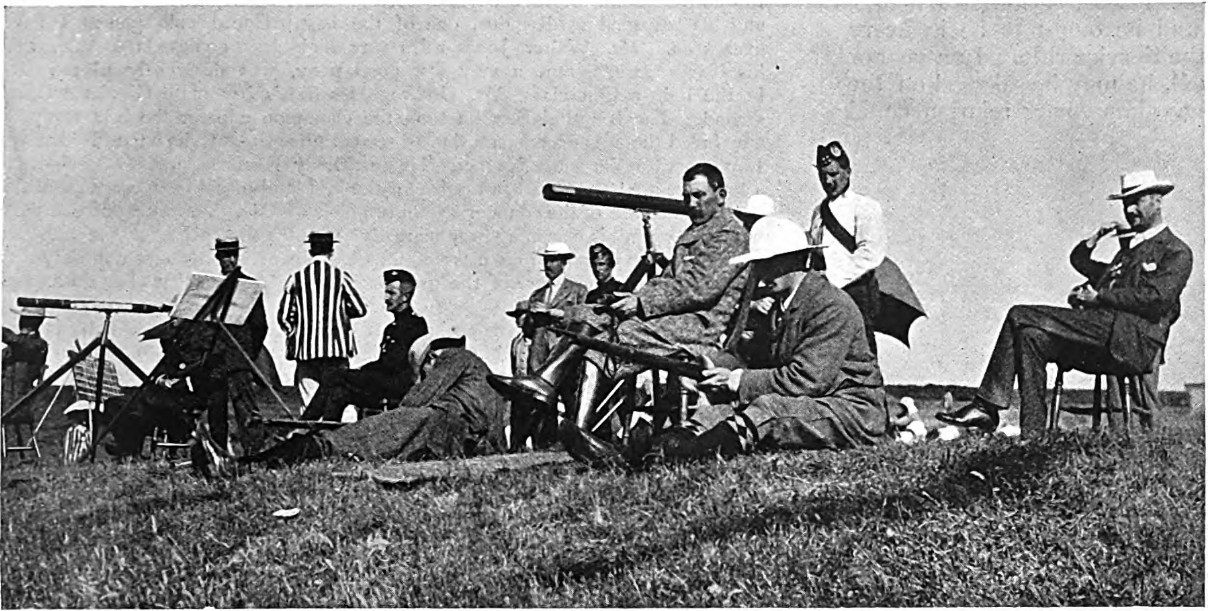
Long-range shooting at Stickledown Range, Bisley, in 1899. Humphry is seated to the right.

Upon graduating from Cambridge, Humphry became a barrister; he was called to the bar at Lincoln's Inn of Court in 1875. In 1876, he published a short book, First Hints on Rifle Shooting. (Note: Hallock 1877, p. 91. The book is Humphry 1876.) He held the ceremonial and administrative position of Senior Esquire Bedell at Cambridge from 1877 until his resignation in 1913. (Note: The Birmingham Daily Post, 10 October 1916, p. 7. For Humphry's resignation, see Cambridge University Calendar 1916–1917, p. 53.) He was also bursar of Selwyn College and steward of Trinity. Outside the university, he was a justice of the peace and a member of the Athenaeum Club of London, the Cambridge County Club, and the Automobile Club of Great Britain. He also served as local secretary, for Cambridge, of the British Medical Association, of which his father was president, and as chairman of the public health committee of Cambridge City Council.

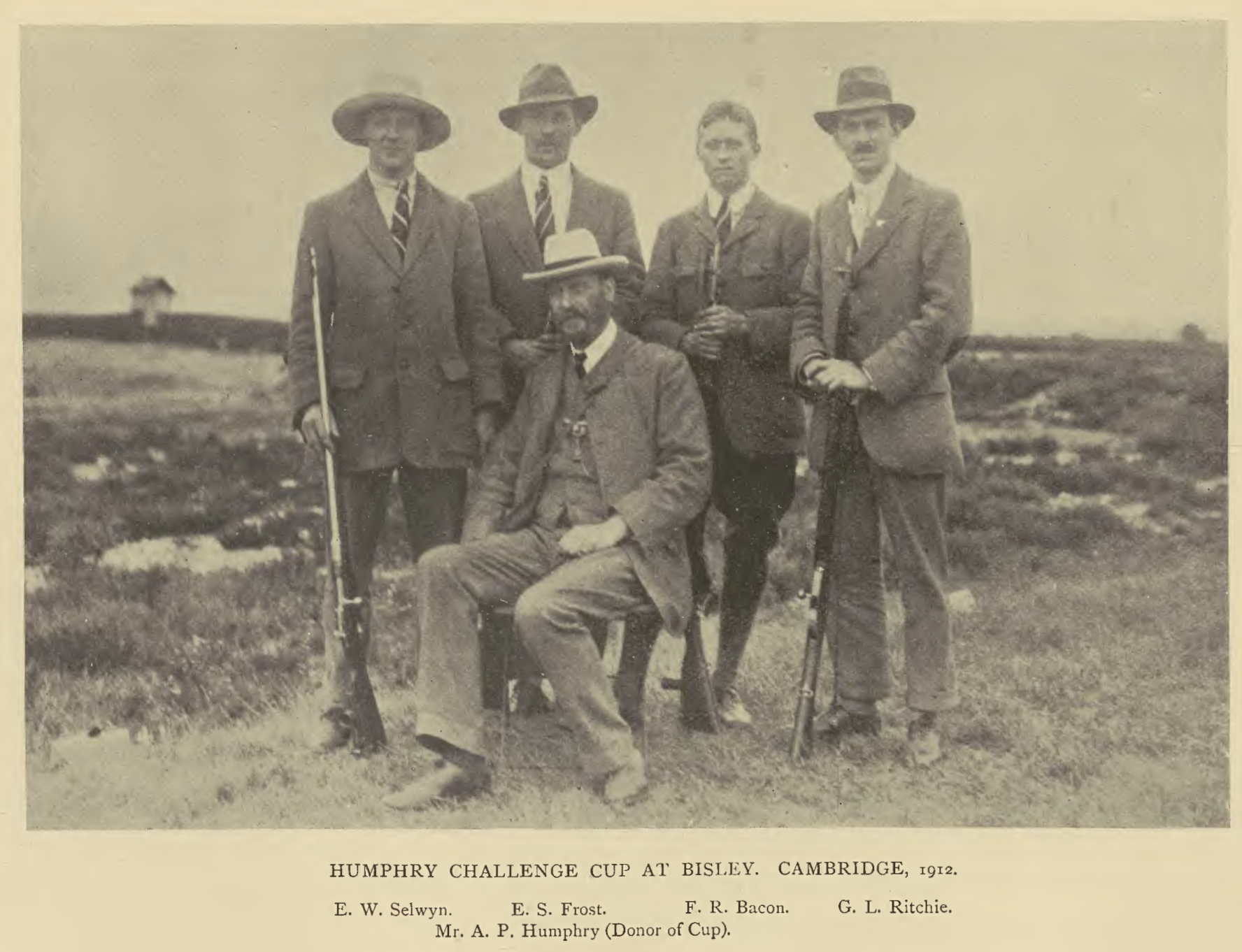
Humphry (seated) with the 1912 Cambridge team for the long-range match against Oxford, for which he donated the trophy in 1880

Humphry was a leading member of the governing council of the NRA, and became the organisation's Executive Officer in 1881. In 1889, the final NRA meeting at Wimbledon was held, and the organisation moved to Bisley Camp in Surrey. Humphry devised a new system, adopted on the NRA's move to Bisley, of indicating the score of a shot on target: a black panel was placed in one of the four corners of a white dummy target, corresponding to the four possible scores for a hit (between two and five points). (Note: Since fullbore shooting is carried out at comparatively long ranges, the targets are marked by workers in trenches below the line of fire, and lowered into them between shots: shooters observe the marked target through a telescope. Under the previous system, the disc used to mark the shot-hole was coloured according to the score: a white disc for a bullseye (five points), a red disc for an inner (four points), a black-and-white disc for a magpie (three points) and a black disc for an outer (two points). This required ranges to be equipped with three different discs, or else to use a single double-sided disc and wave it before marking the shot to indicate different scores.) The association's secretary, Edmond St John-Mildmay, (Note: For St John-Mildmay's first name, see Proceedings of the National Rifle Association, 1879, p. 51 (see also p. 5).) resigned after the end of the last Wimbledon meeting late in 1889; Humphry took the post, by request, on an acting basis, but resigned in 1890, on the grounds that he was unable to perform his duties at the new site. He was made a member of the Royal Victorian Order (an MVO), along with his fellow NRA council members J. A. Barlow and Henry Whitehead, in 1909.

Humphry rose to the rank of colonel in the Volunteers. From 1886 to 1889, he was commanding officer of the CURV, which was redesignated the 4th (Cambridge University) Volunteer Battalion of the Suffolk Regiment in 1888. (Note: Lyttelton 1913, p. 205; Grant 1914, search "Esquire Bedell". For the redesignation of the CURV, see The Cambridge Review, 25 January 1888, p. 160.) During the same years, he was a member of the Cambridgeshire Territorial Forces Association. Between 1900 and 1905, he was a member of the War Office Small Arms Committee, which advised the War Office on technical matters related to military firearms. (Note: LeClair 2019, pp. 55–56. See also "Small Arms Committee". Parliamentary Debates (Hansard). Vol. 21. Parliament of the United Kingdom: House of Commons. 14 February 1911. col. 862.)

In 1913, Humphry published an article in the Journal of the British Archaeological Association on Horham Hall, the stately home near Thaxted in Essex he had bought in 1905. (Note: The article is Humphry 1913. For Humphry's acquisition of the hall, see Munro, Bruce. "Some Stately Homes of North-West Essex". Saffron Walden Historical Society. Grant 1914 confirms that Humphry owned the house by 1906.) In 1914, along with his fellow shooter Thomas Fremantle, 3rd Baron Cottesloe, he published a history of the NRA. (Note: Cornfield 1987, p. 177; the book is Humphry & Fremantle 1914.)

Humphry was married twice; first, on 17 March 1876, to Elizabeth (née Boycott), the daughter of a London doctor, with whom he had three sons (Martin, Stewart and William) and a daughter, Bertha. Elizabeth died on 22 March 1886; Humphry remarried on 1 September 1887 to Clara Edyth (née Murchison), also a London doctor's daughter. They had one son, Alexander Murchison Humphry, and one daughter, Mary. Alexander, as a lieutenant in the Cambridge University Officers' Training Corps, (Note: The CURV had been reorganised as the Cambridge University Officers' Training Corps in 1908, by the Haldane Reforms to the British Army.) won the St George's Prize at Bisley in 1910 with a record score of 139. (Note: Lyttelton 1913, p. 207. For Alexander Humphrey's age, see Burke's Peerage 1921, p. 948. For his score, see The North China Herald, 22 July 1910, p. 180.)

External image
- Gravestone of A. P. and Clara Edyth Humphry at Thaxted churchyard, Essex

Humphry died suddenly on 6 October 1916. He was buried at Thaxted Parish Church, and his memorial service was held in the chapel of Trinity College, Cambridge, on 11 October.

== Works cited ==
=== Newspapers and periodicals ===
- "A Bisley Reverie". Country Life Illustrated. 22 July 1899. pp. 70–72.
- Abbott, Robert Lamb (1887), The Muster Roll of the 1st (Oxford University) V. B.: The Oxfordshire Light Infantry from 1859 to 1887, Oxford
- Bunch, Christopher (Spring 2015). "The Story of Bisley" (PDF). National Rifle Association Journal. Vol. 94, no. 1. pp. 15–20.
- C. (1923). "Rifle Shooting – Methods of Signalling". Journal of the Society for Army Research. 2 (9): 104. JSTOR 44232029.
- The Cambridge University Calendar for the Year 1916–1917, 1916
- "Colonel A. P. Humphry". Birmingham Daily Post. 10 October 1916. p. 3 – via British Newspaper Archive.
- "C. U. R. V." The Cambridge Review. 25 July 1888. p. 160.
- "Death of Sir Henry Halford". The Times. 5 January 1897. Archived from the original on 17 January 2022.
- "Forty-Eighth Annual Meeting Of The British Medical Association (Concluded)". The British Medical Journal. 2 (1025): 298–305. 21 August 1880. JSTOR 25254622.
- Humphry, Alfred Paget (1913). "Horham Hall, Essex". Journal of the British Archaeological Association. 19: 175–180. doi:10.1080/00681288.1913.11893661.
- "The Late Colonel A. P. Humphry". Morning Post. 12 October 1916. p. 7 – via British Newspaper Archive.
- "Late Telegrams". The North China Herald. Vol. 96. 22 July 1910. p. 180 – via Brill Primary Sources.
- "Legal Obituary". The Law Times. Vol. 141. 14 October 1916. p. 417.
- Levsen, Sonja (2008). "Constructing Elite Identities: University Students, Military Masculinity and the Consequences of the Great War in Britain and Germany". Past & Present. 198: 147–183. JSTOR 25096703.
- "Midwives For The Rural And Provincial Poor". The British Medical Journal. 1 (559–560). 7 March 1903. JSTOR 20275598.
- "News and Notes". The Cambridge Review. 18 October 1916.
- "Obituary". The Law Journal. Vol. 51. 14 October 1916. p. 499.
- "Obituary: Sir George Murray Humphry, MD, FRCS, FRS". The British Medical Journal: 975–980. 3 October 1896. JSTOR 20247168.
- "Report". Proceedings of the National Rifle Association: 49–77. 1879.
- "Rifle and Trap Shooting". Forest and Stream. 10 August 1888. p. 84.
- "The Wimbledon Meeting". The Illustrated Sporting and Dramatic News. 27 July 1878. p. 461.
- "The Wimbledon Rifle Meeting". Illustrated London News. 29 July 1871. p. 94 – via British Newspaper Archive.

=== Books and other sources ===
- Burke, Bernard (1921). Thorpe, A. Winton (ed.). A Genealogical and Heraldic History of the Landed Gentry of Great Britain (13th ed.). London: The Burke Publishing Company. OCLC 225803765.
- Cornfield, Susie (1987). The Queen's Prize: The Story of the National Rifle Association. London: Pelham. ISBN 0-7207-1751-5.
- Fremantle, Thomas (1901). The Book of the Rifle. London: Longmans, Green and Co. LCCN 02013540 – via Internet Archive.
- Grant, John, ed. (1914). Essex: Historical, Biographical and Pictorial (PDF). London: The London and Provincial Publishing Co. Ltd. OCLC 1045382475.
- Hallock, Charles (1877). Long-Range Rifle Shooting. New York: Forest and Stream. OCLC 12426742.
- Humphry, Alfred Paget; Fremantle, Thomas (1914). History of the National Rifle Association During Its First Fifty Years, 1859–1909. Cambridge: Bowes. OCLC 59332201.
- Humphry, Alfred Paget (1876). First Hints on Rifle Shooting. London: William Clowes and Sons. OL 23522611M – via Internet Archive.
- LeClair, Daniel (2019). The British Military Revolution of the 19th Century. Jefferson: McFarland. ISBN 978-1-4766-7499-5.
- Lyttelton, Robert Henry (1913). Fifty Years of Sport at Oxford, Cambridge and the Great Public Schools (PDF). Vol. 2. London: W. Southwood. OCLC 3887798.
- Power, D'Arcy (1901). "Humphry, George Murray" . In Lee, Sidney (ed.). Dictionary of National Biography (1st supplement). London: Smith, Elder & Co. pp. 11–13.
- Rook, Arthur; Carlton, Margaret; Cannon, W. Graham (1991). History of Addenbrooke's Hospital, Cambridge. Cambridge University Press. ISBN 0-521-40529-7.
- Rysden, Ogier, ed. (1900). The Book of Blues. London: F. E. Robinson & Co. OCLC 1071263989.
