= Rifle shooting at Cambridge University =

Sporting activity at the University of Cambridge

The sport of rifle shooting at Cambridge University has been practised since at least the early 19th century. Beginning as part of the military training of the Cambridge University Rifle Volunteers, it has since been conducted by a number of student clubs, and is currently carried out predominantly by the Cambridge University Rifle Association and Cambridge University Small Bore Club, with some participation by the Cambridge University Revolver and Pistol Club for the discipline of gallery rifle.

Cambridge shooters compete in a number of Varsity matches against the University of Oxford, which constitute one of the longest-running Oxbridge sporting rivalries. The oldest of these is the Chancellors', currently contested in the discipline of target rifle, which dates to 1862. In 1869, an inter-university long range fixture was set up, which later became the match-rifle Varsity match known as the Humphry. Other Varsity matches include several smallbore fixtures and a gallery rifle match, which replaced the former revolver match in 1997.

Shooting is generally a Half Blue sport at Cambridge, though shooters can be awarded Full Blues for exceptional shooting success. Several Cambridge shooters have become notable in the sport during and after their time at the university, including several winners of the Sovereign's Prize, the most prestigious contest in British target shooting.

== Disciplines and clubs ==
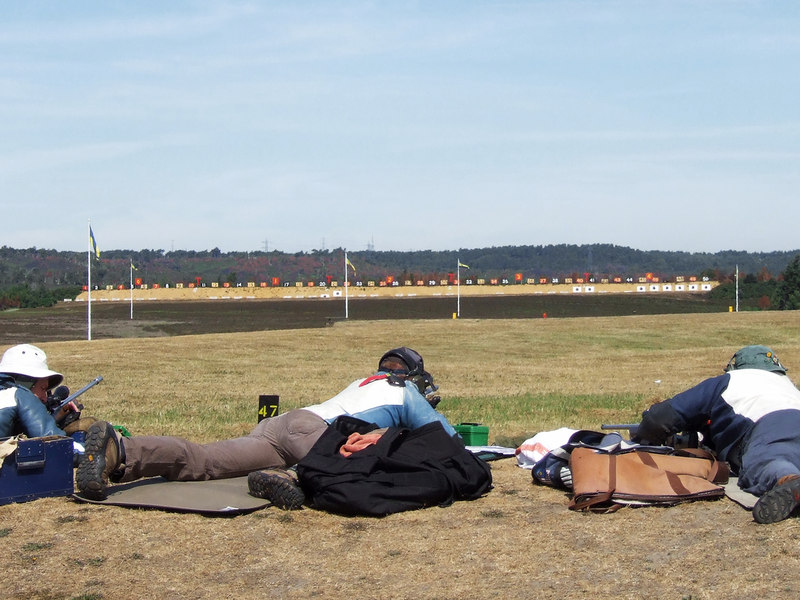
Long-range target rifle shooting on Stickledown Range, Bisley. The jackets, rifles and positions used here are typical of the discipline.

Target rifle shooting in the United Kingdom is traditionally divided into smallbore and fullbore shooting. Smallbore shooting is conducted at shorter ranges, generally between 25 and 100 yards (23 and 91 m), with .22 calibre rifles. As smallbore ranges are often indoors, the competition season runs throughout the year. Fullbore shooting is carried out with larger-calibre rifles (in the modern era, usually .308 calibre) at ranges in the hundreds of yards. The fullbore season runs from March until October, which corresponds approximately to the Easter term of Cambridge University. The discipline of fullbore shooting includes target rifle, shot at shorter ranges — 300–1000 yards (270–910 m) in the modern era — with open sights and strict rules on the positions and equipment permitted, and match rifle, shot at longer ranges — 1000–1200 yards (910–1100 m) — with fewer restrictions on equipment and positions, which include allowing the use of telescopic sights.

Smallbore shooting at Cambridge is conducted by Cambridge University Small-Bore Club, which predominantly operates in the Michaelmas and Lent terms. Fullbore shooting is conducted by the Cambridge University Rifle Association, which largely trains and competes during the Easter term and the 'long vacation' between July and October.

The discipline of gallery rifle, which historically evolved from pistol shooting, is conducted by Cambridge University Revolver and Pistol Club.

Cambridge fullbore shooting, particularly match rifle, maintains close links with the English Eight Club, which administers the England national match rifle team. In 1954, Cambridge undergraduates (along with those of other shooting universities) were granted honorary membership of the English Eight; since 1960, both Oxford and Cambridge Universities have maintained a gun room in the English Eight's clubhouse at Bisley, and have used it as their base on the camp.

== History ==
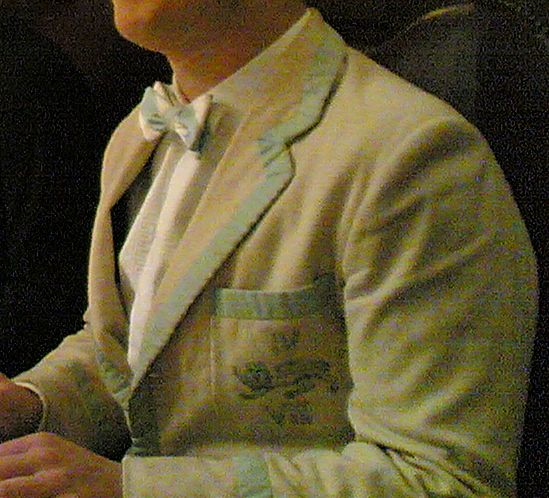
A half blue in rifle shooting: above the lion on the breast pocket, the IV denotes that the holder has shot in the Humphry (match rifle), and the VIII below indicates a cap in the Chancellors' (target rifle).

The first formal shooting club at Cambridge University was formed in 1859, shortly before the 1860 raising of the Cambridge University Rifle Volunteers, a militia unit recruited from the student body. According to a Cambridge rumour, Horatio Ross, one of the great rifle shooters of the nineteenth century, whose son Edward was a member of CURV, once fired from the top of the tower of the Cambridge University Press building at a target 2000 yards away, thereby setting the record for the longest range at which shooting had been conducted in Cambridge.

The CURV, initially part of the Cambridge Rifle Club (which included units from the town's non-student population), first shot on a range on Mill Road, but became an independent organisation on 7 February 1861 and acquired its own range on Grange Road (immediately north of where Leckhampton House was constructed in the 1880s, and opposite what would become Selwyn College) on 30 October. The new range allowed firing at up to 1100 yards (1000 m). It is unclear precisely when the range fell out of use: it was noted on an Ordnance Survey map surveyed in 1950, by which part of the range had been built upon, but is absent from maps from the 1960s.

Prominent Cambridge shots of the nineteenth century included Edward Ross, the winner of the inaugural Queen's Prize in 1860. In 1871, A. P. Humphry equalled Ross's feat of winning the Queen's, and subsequently won the Grand Aggregate in 1878 – successes which made him one of the most famous rifle shooters of his time. The Cambridge University Long Range Rifle Club was founded in 1864, to conduct the two-day 'Cambridge Cup' match rifle meeting. The Long Range Rifle Club is no longer formally associated with the university, but continues to administer the Cambridge Cup competition, now held at Barton Road, to which members of the club and recent alumni of the Oxford and Cambridge rifle teams are invited.

Cambridge University Revolver and Pistol Club was founded in 1907, and competed in its first Varsity match the following year. In 1909, the Cambridge University Rifle Association broke off from the CURV as an independent club. (Note: The date is sometimes given as 1907.) The commanding officer of Cambridge University Officers' Training Corps, the descendant of the CURV, remains ex officio president of CURA.

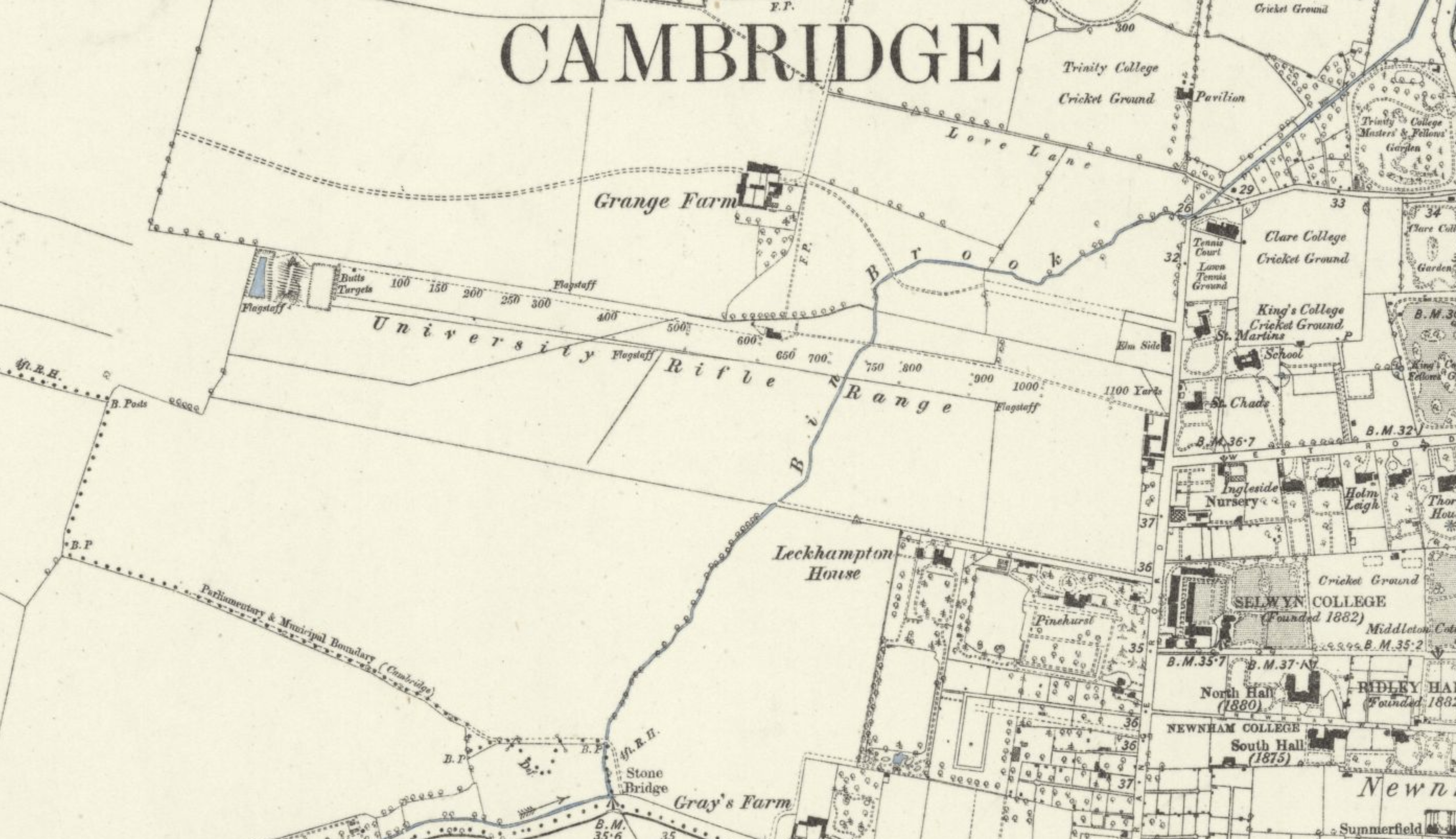
View of the Cambridge University Rifle Ground (opened 1861) on an Ordnance Survey map from 1888.

In a 1913 survey of sport at Oxford, Cambridge and the English public schools, the cricketer and writer Robert Lyttelton noted the nineteenth-century history of shooting at Cambridge, but judged that the sport had "not made much headway" until the foundation of the Officers' Training Corps in 1908. In 1910, A. M. Humphry, a lieutenant in the OTC and son of the Queen's Prize winner, won the St. George's Prize with a record score of 139. Philip Richardson, a Cambridge graduate who made the top 100 shooters of the Sovereign's Final seven times between 1886 and 1907, went on to shoot in the 1908 and 1912 Olympic Games, winning a silver medal in 1908. He later served as chairman of the National Rifle Association's council between 1939 and 1945, and gives his name to a competition shot during the NRA's Imperial Meeting. By 1913, most Cambridge colleges had their own rifle clubs affiliated to CURA, which had a total membership of around 300.

Cambridge University Small-Bore Club existed as a separate club by the 1920s. On 7 March 1952, CUSBC competed by telegram against Harvard University, each team shooting on their own range and sending the results to the other. Harvard won the match by 1581–1554, despite handicapping themselves by firing in the less stable standing and kneeling positions as well as Cambridge's prone.

== Varsity and other matches ==
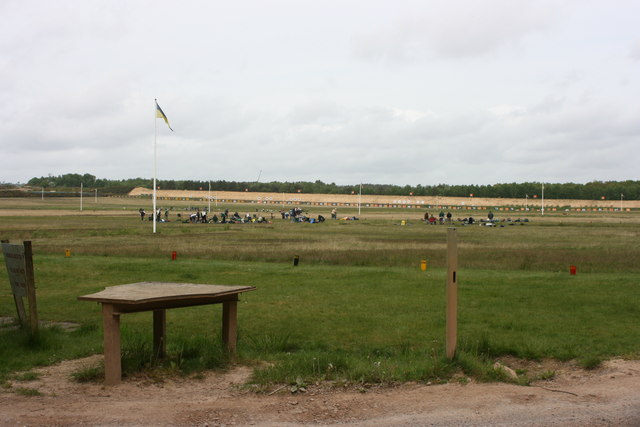
Century Range, Bisley, where the Chancellors' Varsity match is held each July.

There are currently several annual Varsity matches in rifle shooting contested between Cambridge University and Oxford University. The Oxford–Cambridge shooting rivalry is believed to be one of the longest-running Varsity competitions between the two university.

Other than the Heslop and Bentata, the Varsity matches are normally contested during the Imperial Meeting, a series of shooting competitions administered by the British National Rifle Association at Bisley each July.

Both CURA and CUSBC compete in British Universities and Colleges Sport (BUCS). They also compete in matches against clubs, universities and schools throughout the year. (Note: Matches against school teams have included fixtures against Gresham's and Sevenoaks.)

In 1903, a 'Universities' Snap-Shooting Match' was inaugurated in response to the view of Frederick Roberts, then Commander-in-Chief of the Forces, that potential soldiers should be trained in accurate, rapid short-range fire. Each team, consisting of a 'commander' and eight firers, fired from behind cover at head-and-shoulders targets 200 yards (180 m) away, exposed ten times for three seconds each at irregular intervals of between five and ten seconds. The match was contested until at least the 1920s, but no longer takes place.

In addition to the formal Varsity matches, Cambridge compete in three additional annual smallbore fixtures against Oxford. These are the Kensington (2nd VIII), the Ex-Captains' Challenge (3rd VIII) and the Lerman (three-position). An informal black-powder shooting match, known as the Roads Cup, is sometimes contested during the Imperial Meeting. This match is named after Christopher Roads, an ex-Cambridge shooter who donated the trophy in the late 20th century. Within the university, an annual inter-college competition, known as 'Cuppers', is held annually in smallbore shooting.

=== The Chancellors' Challenge Plate ===
In 1862, the chancellors of Oxford and Cambridge universities — William Cavendish and Edward Smith-Stanley — agreed to award a trophy for a shooting match between the two universities: a silver plate set into a large silver stein. The inaugural match was won by Cambridge.

Originally, the match was shot at 200, 500 and 600 yards (180, 460 and 550 m), and seven shots were fired by each shooter. The first matches were shot with muzzle-loading Pattern 1853 Enfield rifles, though breech-loading Snider–Enfield rifles were used from 1871. In 1883, Martini–Henry rifles were introduced, followed by magazine-fed Lee–Enfield rifles in 1897, which remained the standard until the modern era of target shooting in the mid-20th century.

In modern times, it has been contested at 300, 500 and 600 yards (270, 460 and 550 m), with each shooter firing one sighter and ten scoring shots. Any rifle that meets the criteria of the target rifle discipline may be used.

=== The Humphry Challenge Cup ===
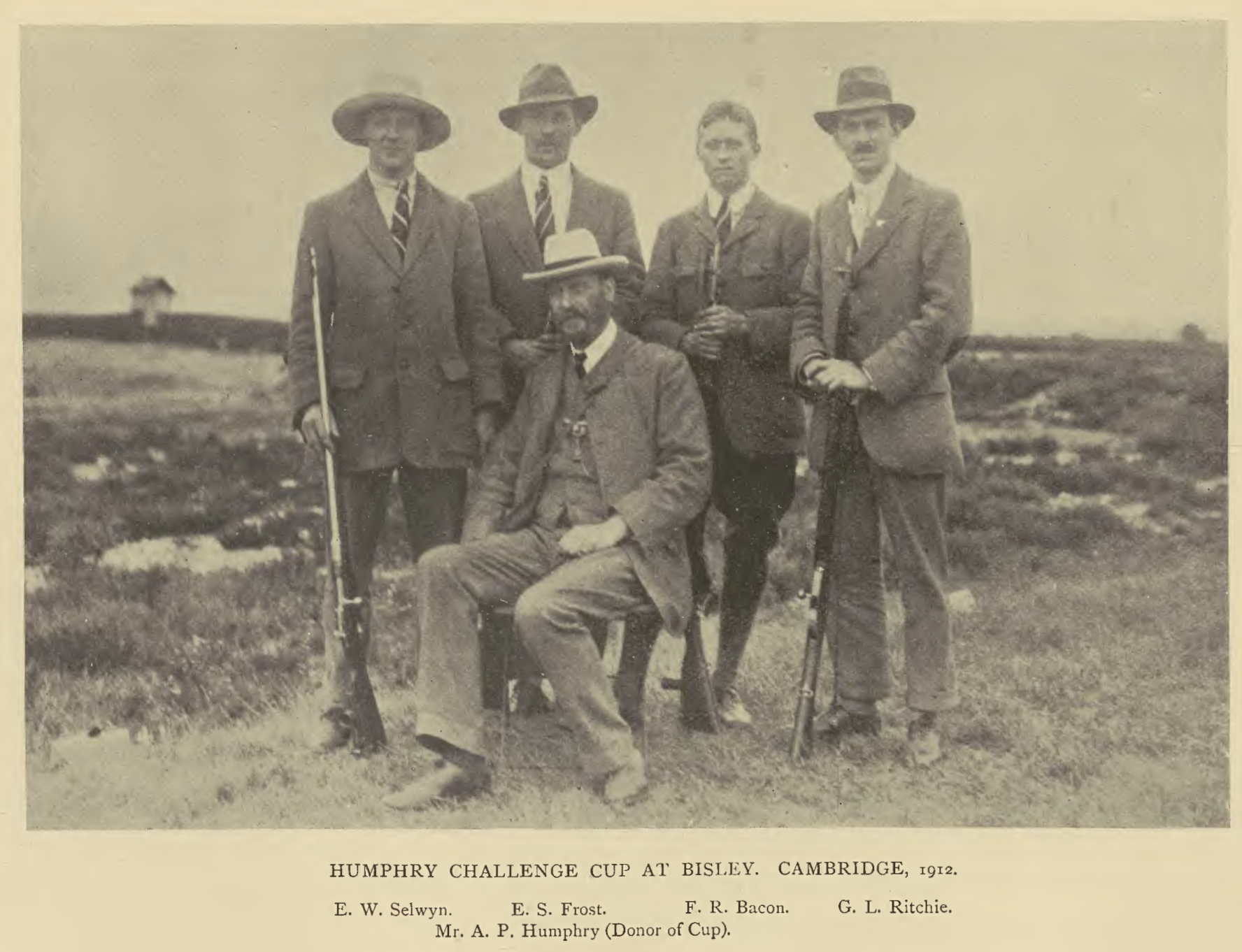
The Cambridge University 'Humphry' team of 1912, photographed at Bisley. In the front of the picture is A. P. Humphry, who donated its trophy in 1881.

The Humphry is the long-range Varsity shooting match, in the discipline originally known as 'any rifle' (to distinguish it from shorter-range shooting, in which all competitors were required to use the same model of rifle) and currently known as match rifle. Its lineage can be traced to the Inter-University Long-Range Match, first contested in 1869. At first, it was shot alternately at Oxford and Cambridge; the match fell into abeyance after 1874, until it was revived at Welwyn in 1878 and moved to the relocated National Rifle Association annual meeting at Wimbledon Common in 1880. In 1881, A. P. Humphry presented a cup to be given as the prize for the match, which has been named for him since. From 1897, the match changed from 'any rifle' to match rifle.

The distance shot for the Humphry, in common with other match rifle competitions, has increased over time as rifles, ammunition and optics have improved. The first matches took place at 800, 900 and 1000 yards (730, 820 and 910 m), which increased to 900, 1000 and 1100 yards (820, 910 and 1010 m) from 1910 and to 1000, 1100 and 1200 yards (910, 1010 and 1100 m) from 1963.

The match is currently shot on Stickledown Range at Bisley. Until 1874, the venue alternated between Cambridge and Oxford; after a lapse in which no match took place between 1875 and 1877, it was shot at Welwyn in 1878 before being added to the programme of the NRA competitions in 1879, first at Wimbledon, and then at Bisley from 1890.

The Humphry is shot between teams of four, with fifteen scoring shots fired at each range by each shooter. Unusually for a modern shooting match, coaches who are not otherwise eligible to shoot in the match may be part of the team, though firers must be current students of the university they represent.

=== The Oxford and Cambridge Match ===
The Oxford and Cambridge Match is contested in gallery rifle. It was first shot informally in 1908, with formal matches beginning at Bisley in 1909.

The match was originally shot with revolvers, and so named the 'Universities Revolver Match'. In this format, each shooter fired twelve shots at each of 20 and 50 yards (18 and 46 m).

The trophy for the match was presented by Ian Heslop in 1929. The match was officially known as the Heslop Cup between 1929 and 1948, and continues to be informally known as 'the Heslop' among CURPC shooters. In 1949, the official name was changed to the 'Oxford and Cambridge Revolver Match', followed by the 'Oxford and Cambridge Pistol Match' in 1962.

Following the UK ban on fullbore pistol shooting in 1997, the match moved to lever-action .357 centre-fire gallery rifles. Each university enters a team of four.

=== The Heslop Cup ===
The annual smallbore Varsity match is held in February. Since the 1920s, it has been named for Ian Heslop, a British naturalist and conservationist who helped Cambridge to a period of dominance in the match between 1923 and 1926.

The Heslop is contested between teams of eight shooters, each shooting two ten-spot cards at 25 yards (23 m), with a total highest possible score of 200. It is traditionally held on a neutral range: in the 21st century, venues have included the National Smallbore Rifle Association at Bisley, The Perse School in Cambridge and Sevenoaks School in Kent.

=== The Bentata Cup ===
The Bentata is the newest of the Varsity matches, contested since around 1990. It is named for David Bentata, an Oxford University alumnus who established the match and donated its trophy.

The match is contested between women's teams of four shooters. It is shot to the same conditions and at the same time as the Heslop, and shooters may shoot the two concurrently, counting their score in the Heslop for both.

== Varsity match results ==
=== Chancellors' ===
Year	Winning Team	Score
1862	Cambridge	372 – ?
1863	Cambridge	402 – ?
1864	Cambridge	415 – ?
1865	Cambridge	314 – ?
1866	Oxford	412 – ?
1867	Oxford	369 – ?
1868	Cambridge	424 – ?
1869	Cambridge	395 – ?
1870	Cambridge	410 – ?
1871	Oxford	433 – ?
1872	Cambridge	520 – ?
1873	Oxford	455 – ?
1874	Oxford	509 – 501
1875	Cambridge	561 – 552
1876	Oxford	552 – ?
1877	Oxford	537 – ?
1878	Cambridge	621 – ?
1879	Cambridge	565 – ?
1880	Cambridge	603 – ?
1881	Oxford	555 – ?
1882	Oxford	471 – ?
1883	Oxford	653 – ?
1884	Cambridge	607 – ?
1885	Cambridge	606 – ?
1886	Cambridge	609 – ?
1887	Oxford	638 – ?
1888	Cambridge	645 – ?
1889	Cambridge	615 – ?
1890	Oxford	598 – ?
1891	Cambridge	637 – ?
1892	Cambridge	611 – ?
1893	Cambridge	671 – 610
1894	Cambridge	665 – ?
1895	Cambridge	624 – ?
1896	Cambridge	606 – ?
1897	Cambridge	715 – ?
1898	Cambridge	724 – ?
1899	Oxford	712 – ?
1900	Oxford	637 – ?
1901	Cambridge	713 – ?
1902	Cambridge	736 – ?
1903	Cambridge	727 – ?
1904	Cambridge	710 – ?
1905	Cambridge	707 – ?
1906	Oxford	691 – ?
1907	Oxford	719 – ?
1908	Cambridge	736 – ?
1909	Oxford	750 – ?
1910	Cambridge	756 – ?
1911	Cambridge	748 – ?
1912	Cambridge	750 – ?
1913	Cambridge	Margin of 5 points
1914	Cambridge	751 – 724
1915	No match	
1916	No match	
1917	No match	
1918	No match	
1919	No match	
1925	Cambridge	
1927	Oxford	
1929	Oxford	1029 – 1028
1940	No match	
1941	No match	
1942	No match	
1943	No match	
1944	No match	
1945	No match	
1998	Cambridge	1150.106v – 1112.80v
1999	Cambridge	1143.107v – 1120.88v
2000	Cambridge	1157.123v – 1111.93v
2001	Cambridge	1142.108v – 1129.110v
2002	Cambridge	1164.116v – 1146.105v
2003	Cambridge	1170.126v – 1164.132v (Note: Record score. Total recorded as 1170.125v but the individual scores add up to 1170.126v.)
2004	Cambridge	1143.108v – 1142.111v
2005	Oxford	1155.112v – 1142.115v
2006	Cambridge	1122.80v – 1109.83v
2007	Cambridge	1133.106v – 1066.64v
2008	Cambridge	1141.99v – 1127.96v
2009	Cambridge	1157.126v – 1133.96v
2010	Cambridge	1153.125v – 965.75v
2011	Cambridge	1149.107v – 1126.85v
2012	Cambridge	1141.100v – 1127.91v
2013	Cambridge	1142.86v – 1115.93v
2014	Oxford	1141.99v – 1111.91v
2015	Cambridge	1148.102v – 1096.83v
2016	Cambridge	1166.128v – 1118.123v
2017	Cambridge	1120.82v – 1079.76v
2018	Cambridge	1155.116v – 1104.62v
2019	Cambridge	1158.111v – 1152.115v
2020	Cambridge	1024.125v – 1000.97v (Note: Seven firers per team only, so maximum possible score is 1050.210v rather than 1200.240v.)
2021	Oxford	1149.112v – 1141.116v
2022	Cambridge	1163.128v – 1101.93v
2023	Oxford	1127.88v – 1121.93v
2024	Cambridge	1137.98v – 1100.83v
2025	Cambridge	1137.99v – 1133.109v

=== Humphry ===
Year	Winning Team	Score
1880	Cambridge	676 – ?
1881	Oxford	717 – ?
1882	Oxford	706 – ?
1883	Oxford	662 – ?
1884	Oxford	634 – ?
1885	Oxford	706 – ?
1886	Oxford	739 – ?
1887	Oxford	638 – ?
1888	Oxford	626 – ?
1889	Oxford	707 – ?
1890	Oxford	750 – ?
1891	Cambridge	791 – ?
1892	Cambridge	746 – 686
1893	Cambridge	761 – ?
1894	Cambridge	795 – ?
1895	Oxford	766 – 726
1896	Cambridge	742 – ?
1897	Cambridge	774 – 633
1898	Oxford	755 – ?
1899	Oxford	758 – ?
1900	Cambridge	731 – 708
1901	Oxford	790 – ?
1902	Oxford	735 – 692
1903	Cambridge	697 – 688
1904	Cambridge	801 – 784
1905	Cambridge	753 – ?
1906	Cambridge	763 – 750
1907	Oxford	760 – 721
1908	Oxford	836 – ?
1909	Cambridge	831 – ?
1910	Cambridge	777 – ?
1911	Oxford	722 – ?
1912	Oxford	763 – ?
1913	Oxford	766 – 711
1914	Oxford	906 – 822
1915	No match	
1916	No match	
1917	No match	
1918	No match	
1919	No match	
1920	Oxford	
1921	Oxford	
1922	Oxford	809 – 797
1923	Oxford	803 – 799
1924	Oxford	
1925	Cambridge	846 – 836
1926	Cambridge	826 – 805
1927	Cambridge	826 – 805
1928	Oxford	805 – 797
1929	Cambridge	
1931	Cambridge	
1932	Cambridge	
1933	Cambridge	
1934	Cambridge	
1935	Cambridge	
1936	Oxford	
1937	Oxford	? – 838
1938	Cambridge	
1939	Oxford	
1940	No match	
1941	No match	
1942	No match	
1943	No match	
1944	No match	
1945	No match	
1951	Oxford	836 – 825
2001	Cambridge	
2002	Cambridge	
2003	Cambridge	
2004	Cambridge	
2005	Cambridge	806.52v – 802.41v
2006	Cambridge	827.59v – 823.60v
2007	Cambridge	854.76v – 846.68v
2008	Cambridge	836.74v – 835.70v
2009	Cambridge	845.64v – 815.46v
2010	Cambridge	783.49v – 732.27v
2011	Cambridge	792.50v – 773.42v
2012	Cambridge	812.57v – 776.43v
2013	Cambridge	836.36v – 816.54v
2014	Cambridge	837.72v – 820.50v
2015	Cambridge	831.71v – 722.33v
2016	Cambridge	858.79v – 781.43v
2017	Cambridge	860.93v – 827.53v
2018	Cambridge	872.93v – 841.68v
2019	Cambridge	837.76v – 816.46v
2020	Oxford	867.83v – 851.85v
2021	Cambridge	835.60v – 832.68v
2022	Cambridge	828.67v – 794.51v
2023	Cambridge	837.66v – 835.67v
2024	Oxford	843.90v – 837.68v
2025	Oxford	835.66v – 827.53v
2026	Cambridge	832.68v – 801.53v

=== Revolver and gallery rifle ===
==== Oxford and Cambridge Match (1998–) ====
Year	Winning Team	Score
1998	Oxford	
1999	Oxford	
2000	Oxford	
2001	Oxford	
2002	Oxford	
2003	Oxford	
2004	Cambridge	709 – ?
2005	Cambridge	710 – 666
2006	Cambridge	736 – 577
2007	Oxford	1099 – 894
2008	Oxford	682 – 639
2009	Oxford	335– 334
2010	Cambridge	722 – 658
2011	Cambridge	739 – 701
2012	Cambridge	742 – 701
2013	Cambridge	1488 – 1389
2014	Cambridge	1492 – 1462
2015	Cambridge	1520 – 1485
2016	Oxford	1536 – 1529
2017	Oxford	1523 – 1499
2018	Oxford	1509 – 1500
2019	Cambridge	1488 – 1322
2022	Oxford	1293.11x – 1172.10x
2023	Cambridge	1292.18x – 1256.9x
2024	Cambridge	2168.33x – 1829.16x
2025	Cambridge	2086.28x – 2075.32x

==== Revolver match (1909–1997) ====
Year	Winning Team	Score
1909	Cambridge	433 – ?
1910	Cambridge	485 – ?
1911	Cambridge	495 – ?
1912	Cambridge	481 – ?
1913	Cambridge	436 – ?
1914	Cambridge	410 – 335
1915	No match	
1916	No match	
1917	No match	
1918	No match	
1919	No match	
1920	Cambridge	102 – ?
1921	Cambridge	264 – ?
1922	Oxford	302 – ?
1923	Cambridge	360 – ?
1924	Cambridge	327 – ?
1925	Cambridge	275 – ?
1926	Cambridge	255 – ?
1927	Cambridge	287 – ?
1928	Cambridge	239 – ?
1929	Cambridge	233– ?
1930	Cambridge	233– ?
1931	Cambridge	250 – ?
1932	Cambridge	242 – ?
1933	Cambridge	235 – ?
1934	Cambridge	257 – ?
1935	Cambridge	247 – ?
1936	Cambridge	206 – ?
1937	Cambridge	219 – ?
1938	Oxford	220 – ?
1939	Cambridge	251 – ?
1940	No match	
1941	No match	
1942	No match	
1943	No match	
1944	No match	
1945	No match	
1946	Cambridge	207 – ?
1947	Cambridge	232 – ?
1948	Cambridge	221 – ?
1949	Oxford	191 – ?
1950	Cambridge	249 – ?
1951	Cambridge	220 – ?
1952	Cambridge	238 – ?
1953	Oxford	222 – ?
1954	Oxford	248 – ?
1955	Oxford	278 – ?
1956	Oxford	295 – ?
1957	Oxford	295 – ?
1958	Cambridge	284 – ?
1959	Oxford	280 – ?
1960	Oxford	331 – ?
1961	Oxford	1418 – ?
1962	Oxford	1393 – ?
1963	Oxford	1356 – ?
1964	Oxford	1394 – ?
1965	Oxford	1396 – ?
1966	Cambridge	1274 – ?
1967	Cambridge	1361 – ?
1968	Oxford	1415 – ?
1969	Cambridge	1297 – ?
1970	Cambridge	1386 – ?
1971	Cambridge	1321 – ?
1972	Cambridge	1416 – ?
1973	Oxford	1356 – ?
1974	Oxford	1333 – ?
1975	Oxford	1338 – ?
1976	Cambridge	1364 – ?
1977	Oxford	1452 – 1344
1978	Cambridge	1397 – 1297
1979	Cambridge	1355 – 1319
1980	Oxford	1395 – ?
1981	Cambridge	1435 – ?
1982	Oxford	1426 – ?
1983	Cambridge	1414 – ?
1984	Oxford	1374 – 1368
1985	Oxford	2154– 1817
1986	Oxford	2162– 2013
1987	Oxford	2073– ?
1988	Oxford	2081 – ?
1989	Oxford	2081 – 1556
1990	Oxford	2045 – 2012
1991	Cambridge	1978 – 1962
1992	Oxford	2095 – ?
1993	Cambridge	1909 – ?
1994	Oxford	2064 – ?
1995	Oxford	1370 – 1300
1996	Oxford	1442 – ?

In 2017, an informal revolver Varsity match was conducted in Switzerland, fired with a revolver used during one of the early 20th-century matches. Cambridge won by 626 to 568.

=== Heslop (smallbore) ===
Year	Winning Team	Score
1923	Cambridge	
1924	Cambridge	
1925	Cambridge	
1926	Cambridge	
1927	Cambridge	
1928	Cambridge	
1929	Cambridge	
1930	Cambridge	
1931	Oxford	
1932	Oxford	
1933	Oxford	
1934	Cambridge	
1935	Cambridge	
1936	Cambridge	
1937	Cambridge	785 – 777
1938	Cambridge	
1939	Cambridge	
1940	No match	
1941	No match	
1942	No match	
1943	No match	
1944	No match	
1945	No match	
1946	Oxford	
1947	Oxford	
1948	Oxford	
1949	Cambridge	
1950	Cambridge	
1951	Cambridge	
1952	Oxford	
1953	Cambridge	
1954	Cambridge	786 – 770
1955	Cambridge	
1956	Cambridge	
1957	Cambridge	
1958	Cambridge	
1959	Cambridge	
1960	Cambridge	
1961	Cambridge	
1962	Cambridge	
1963	Cambridge	792–778
1964	Cambridge	782 – 777
1965	Oxford	
1966	Cambridge	
1967	Cambridge	
1968	Cambridge	
1969	Cambridge	
1970	Cambridge	
1971	Cambridge	
1972	Cambridge	
1973	Cambridge	
1974	Cambridge	
1975	Cambridge	
1976	Oxford	
1977	Cambridge	
1978	Cambridge	
1979	Cambridge	
1980	Cambridge	
1981	Oxford	
1982	Cambridge	
1983	Draw	
1984	Cambridge	
1985	Cambridge	
1986	Cambridge	
1987	Oxford	
1988	Oxford	
1989	Oxford	
1990	Cambridge	
1991	Cambridge	
1992	Cambridge	
1993	Cambridge	
1994	Cambridge	
1995	Cambridge	
1996	Cambridge	
1997	Oxford	
1998	Cambridge	
1999	Cambridge	
2000	Cambridge	
2001	Cambridge	
2003	Oxford	1528 – 1518
2004	Oxford	1530 – 1521
2005	Cambridge	1509 – 1501
2006	Cambridge	
2007	Draw	1528 – 1528
2008	Cambridge	1547 – 1505
2009	Cambridge	1530 – 1508
2010	Cambridge	1511 – 1485
2011	Cambridge	1513 – 1479
2012	Cambridge	1519 – 1499
2013	Cambridge	1515 – 1514
2014	Cambridge	1505 – 1496
2015	Cambridge	1522 – 1473
2016	Cambridge	1526 – 1466
2018	Cambridge	1544 – 1479
2019	Cambridge	1538 – 1496
2020	Cambridge	1555 – 1517
2021	No match	
2022	Cambridge	1525 – 1498
2023	Cambridge	1536 – 1517
2024	Cambridge	1537 – 1526
2025	Cambridge	1541 – 1531
2026	Oxford	1532 – 1513

=== Bentata ===
Year	Winning Team	Score
2003	Oxford	716 – 705
2004	Oxford	722 – 720
2005	Cambridge	748 – 702
2007	Oxford	761 – 751
2008	Cambridge	768 – 706
2009	Cambridge	768 – 706
2010	Cambridge	729 – 716
2012	Cambridge	744 – 691
2013	Cambridge	756 – 690
2014	Cambridge	753 – 719
2015	Cambridge	745 – 687
2016	Oxford	725 – 717
2017	Cambridge	760 – 738
2018	Cambridge	760 – 751
2019	Cambridge	768 – 756
2020	Cambridge	772 – 740
2021	No match	
2022	Cambridge	753 – 718
2023	Oxford	763 – 761
2024	Cambridge	770 – 762
2025	Oxford	763 – 761
2026	Oxford	770 – 754

== Blues and club colours ==
Rifle shooting is a Discretionary Full Blue sport, meaning that shooters who compete in Varsity matches are usually awarded Half Blues, but can be awarded Full Blues if they meet certain additional criteria. To be awarded a Half Blue for smallbore shooting, a shooter must score at least 190 out of 200 in the Heslop or Bentata match; in fullbore, those shooting in the Chancellors' or Humphry are automatically awarded one.

The breast pocket of the Half Blue jacket displays a lion, one of the traditional symbols of Cambridge University. A shooter who has won the Half Blue for competing in the Chancellors' will have the Roman numerals 'VIII' stitched beneath the lion; a shooter who has competed in the Humphry will alternatively or additionally stitch 'IV' above the lion. Those who have won the Half Blue in small-bore shooting stitch the initials 'CUSBC' lowermost upon the pocket.

Shooters who represent the university against Oxford, whether in 1st-team competition or at a lower level, may wear the club colours. These consist of a jacket and matching tie, sometimes with a cap, in maroon and Cambridge blue.

== Notable Cambridge shooters ==
- Alice Good (Emmanuel): winner of the Queen's Prize in 2022.
- Ian Heslop (Corpus Christi; 1904–1970): shooter, naturalist and lepidopterist.
- A. P. Humphry (Trinity; 1850–1916): winner of the Queen's Prize in 1871.
- Henry Jeens: winner of the Queen's Prize in 2004, the year of his graduation.
- Richard Jeens (brother of Henry): winner of the Queen's Prize in 2014.
- Philip W. Richardson: silver medallist in the 1908 Summer Olympics.
- Edward Ross (son of Horatio): a private of the CURV who won the inaugural Queen's Prize in 1860.
- Nick Tremlett: winner of the Queen's Prize in 2009.

== Gallery ==
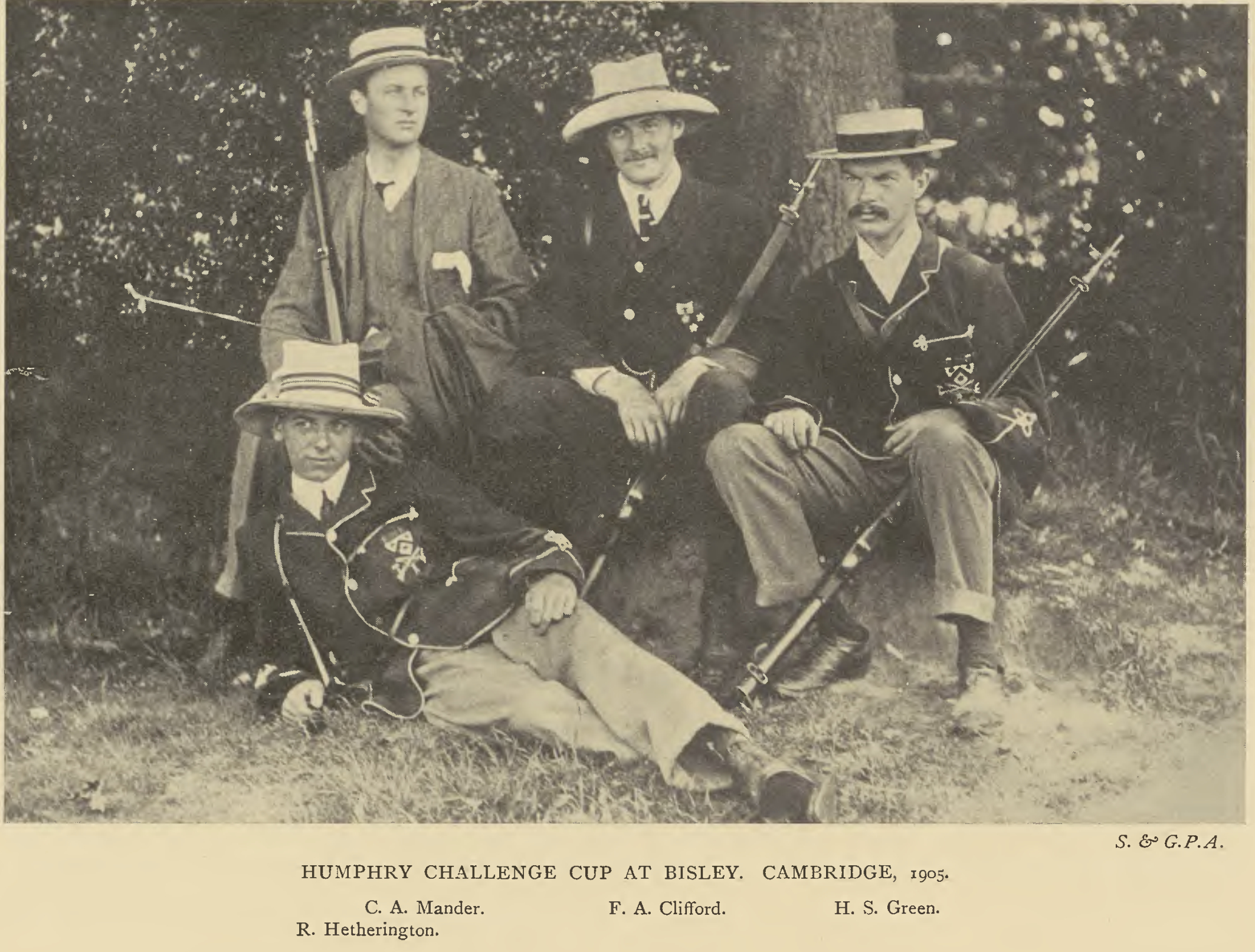
Cambridge University team for the 'Humphry', 1905

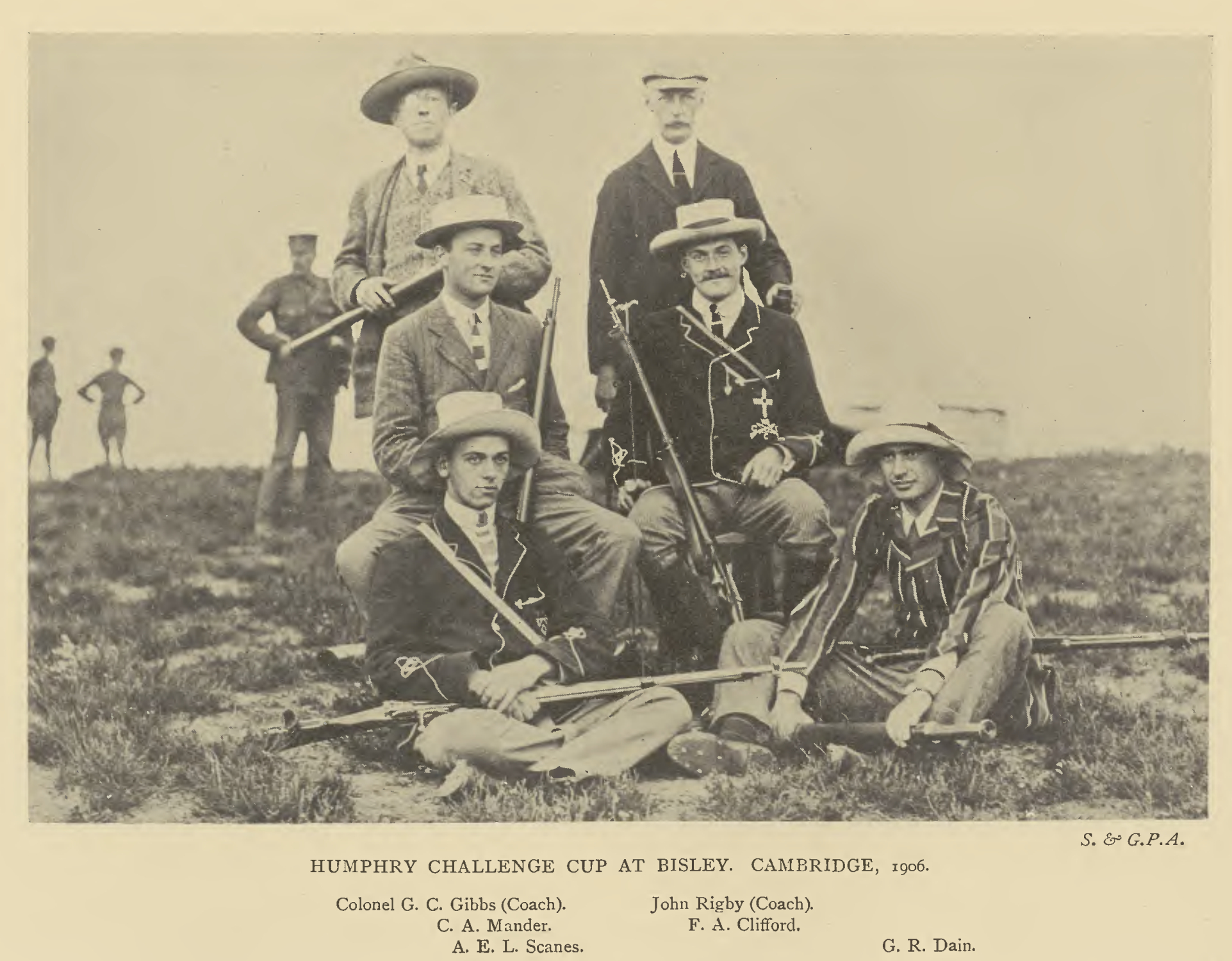
Cambridge University team for the 'Humphry', 1906

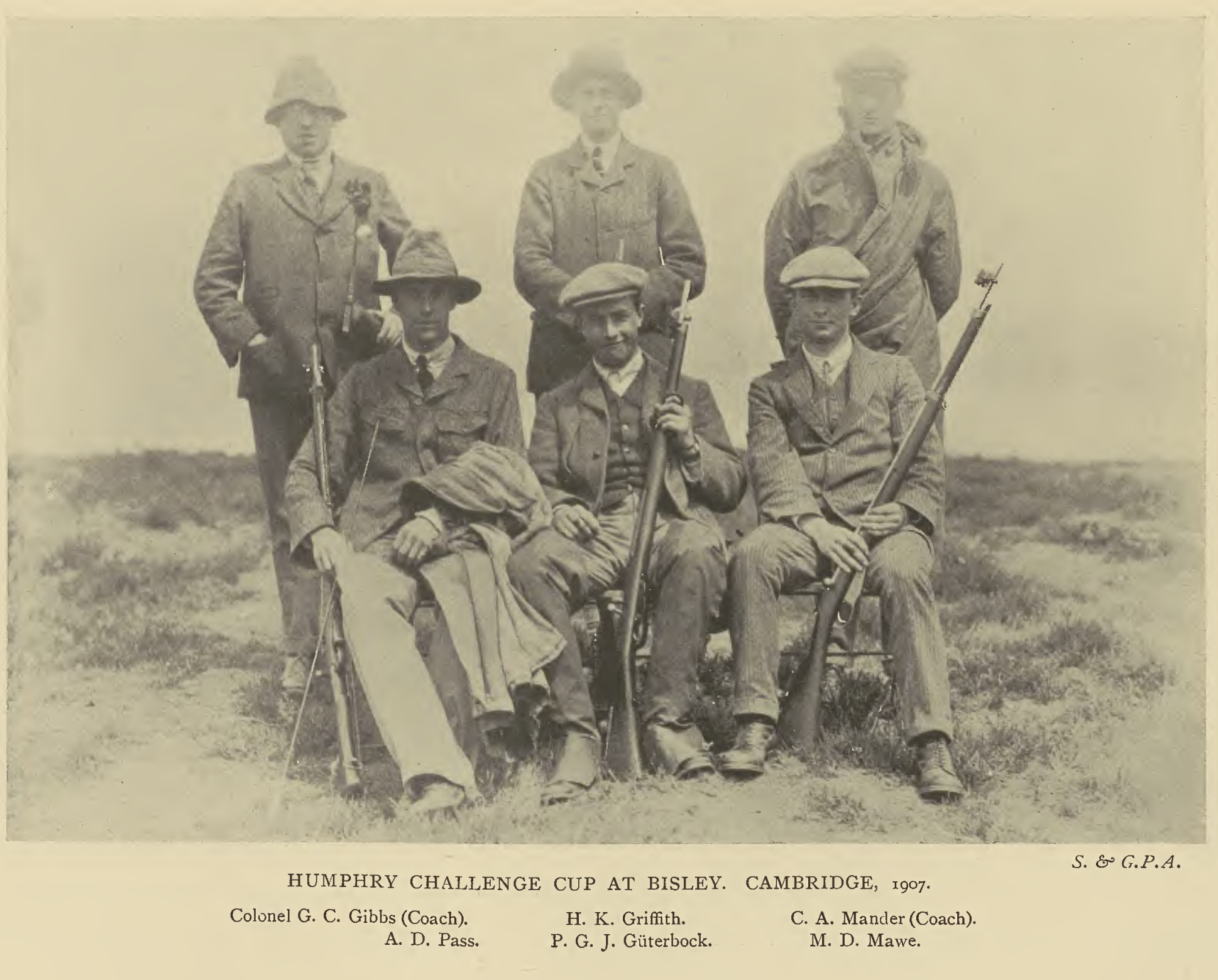
Cambridge University team for the 'Humphry', 1907

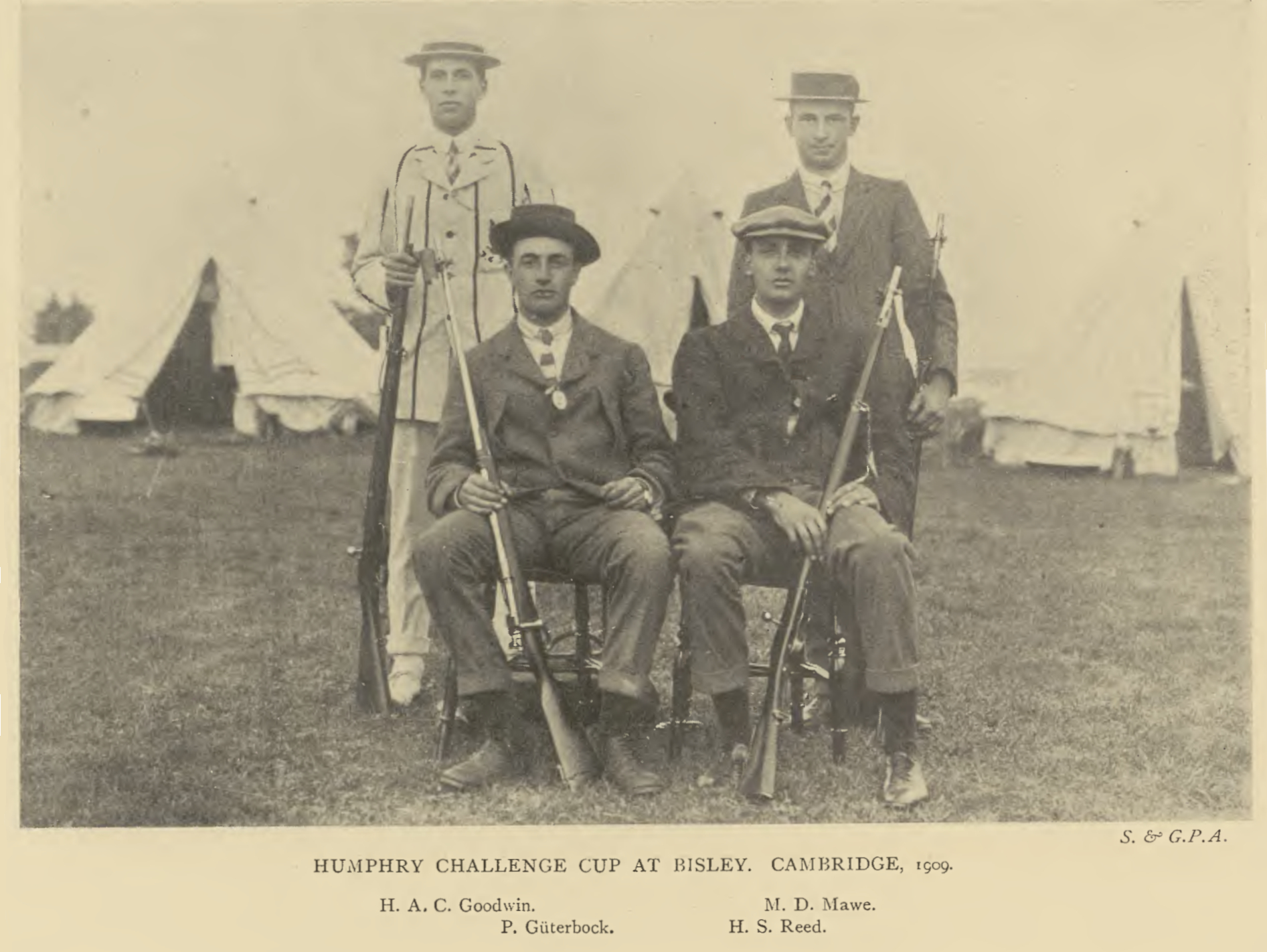
Cambridge University team for the 'Humphry', 1909

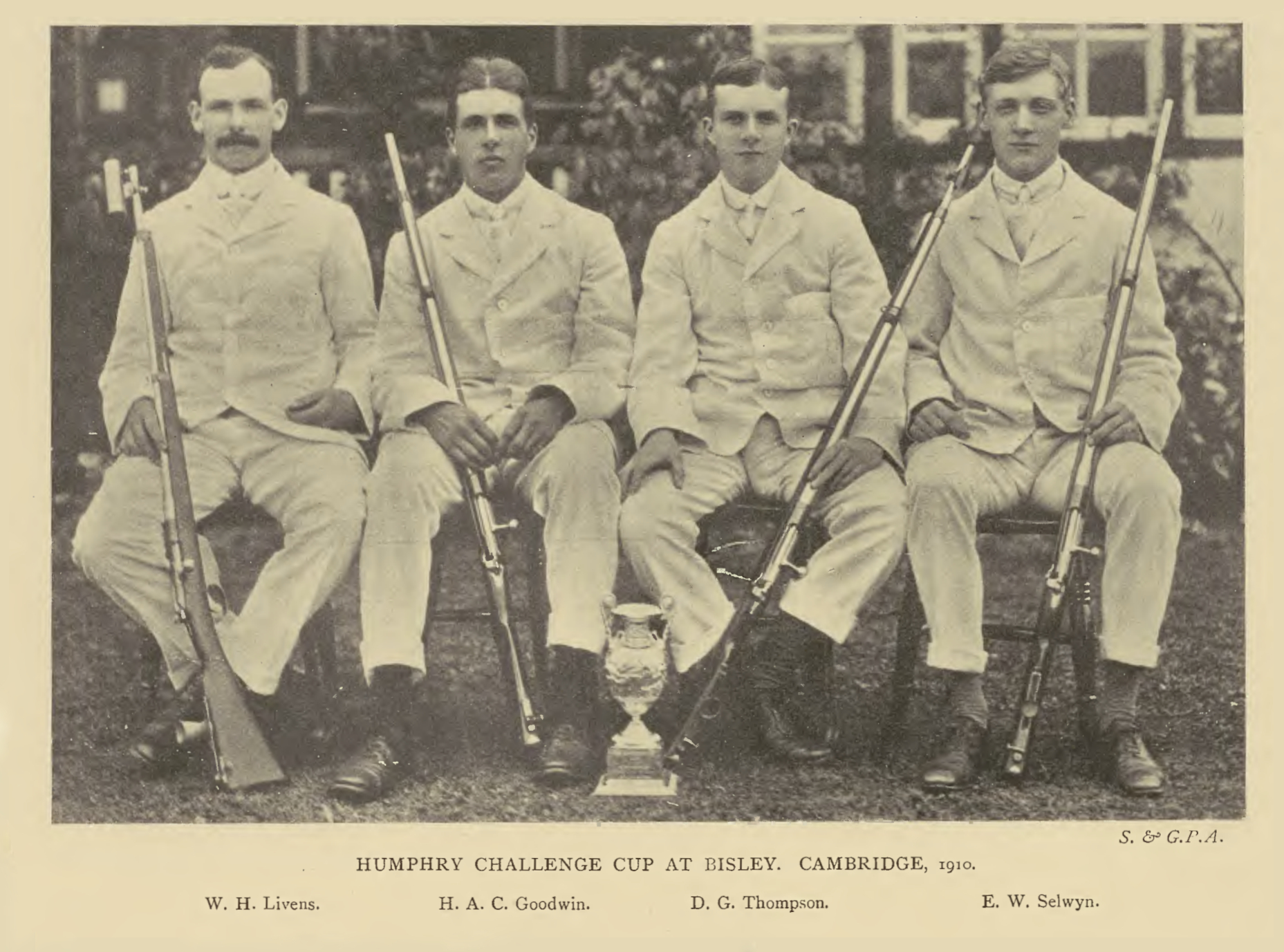
Cambridge University team for the 'Humphry', 1910

== Bibliography ==
=== Period newspapers and reports ===
- "3: The Evening News, Monday". Portsmouth Evening News. 1927-07-11. p. 3.
- Armstrong, Simon; Firth, David (2015-02-20). "Shooting Varsity: CUSBC Blues Beat Oxford for Eighth Year". The Blue Bird. Archived from the original on 2023-03-26.
- "Bisley". Derby Daily Telegraph. 1924-07-16. p. 3.
- "Bisley". Exeter and Plymouth Gazette. 1925-07-15. p. 8.
- "Bisley". Wells Journal. 1907-07-11. p. 5.
- "Bisley". Wells Journal. 1897-07-15. p. 6.
- "Bisley Camp". Worcester Journal. 1895-07-13. p. 3.
- "Bisley, Halford Cup, Oxford and Cambridge and Public Schools". Daily News (London). 1913-07-17. p. 5.
- "The Bisley Meeting, The Humphrey [sic] Cup, Scarcity of Markers". Nottingham Evening Post. 1902-07-15. p. 5.
- "The Bisley Meeting". Bath Chronicle and Weekly Gazette. 1906-07-12. p. 5.
- "The Bisley Meeting". Globe. 1904-07-14. p. 7.
- "Bisley Meeting". Gloucester Citizen. 1926-07-10. p. 6.
- "The Bisley Meeting". Gloucester Citizen. 1903-07-16. p. 3.
- "Bisley Meeting". Gloucester Citizen. 1900-07-10. p. 3.
- "The Bisley Meeting". Sheffield Daily Telegraph. 1892-07-13. p. 5.
- "The Bisley Meeting". Western Gazette. 1913-07-25. p. 12 – via British Newspaper Archive.
- "Bisley Rifle Meeting". Gloucestershire Echo. 1914-07-18. p. 3 – via British Newspaper Archive.
- "Bisley Shooting". Gloucester Citizen. 1925-07-15. p. 7.
- "Bisley Ties". Aberdeen Press and Journal. 1928-07-09. p. 6.
- "Bisley: Wonderful Shooting, St George's First Stage". The Scotsman. 1927-07-13. p. 7.
- "Cambridge Beaten in Humphry Cup at Bisley". Western Chronicle. 1922-07-21. p. 11.
- Cargill Thompson, Alex (Autumn 2023). "Imperial Meeting: Match Rifle Report". National Rifle Association Journal. E (3): 49–50.
- "C. U. Rifle Association". The Cambridge Review. 41 (1027): 436. 1920-06-18. Archived from the original on 2023-03-26.
- Cambridge University Revolver and Pistol Club (2019). "Rifle Varsity". Cambridge University Revolver and Pistol Club. Archived from the original on 2023-03-25.
- Cambridge University Rifle Association and Small Bore Club (2023-03-07). "Facebook: Cambridge University Rifle Association and Small Bore Club". Facebook.
- Cambridge University Small Bore Club (2022-12-31). "Varsity Matches 2022". C.U.S.B.C. News.
- De Launay, Tony (26 July 2004). "Quick Fire Aids Jeens". The Times. Archived from the original on 2026-02-28.
- "Disastrous Experiment". Sheffield Daily Telegraph. 1929-07-17. p. 7.
- Great Britain Match Rifle Team (2021-05-31). "Humphry Challenge Cup". Match Rifle Shooting of Great Britain and Ireland. Archived from the original on 2023-03-26.
- Great Britain Match Rifle Team (2022-07-14). "The Humphry". Match Rifle Shooting of Great Britain and Ireland. Archived from the original on 2023-03-27.
- Gresham's School (2023-02-27). "Our rifle club enjoyed their tour to northern England and Edinburgh". Gresham's School. Archived from the original on 2023-03-25.
- "Late Telegrams". The North China Herald. Vol. 96. 22 July 1910. pp. 179–180.
- "Local and District News". Western Gazette. 1929-11-22. p. 5.
- National Rifle Association (1874). "Prize List and Details of Shooting". Proceedings of the National Rifle Association: 103–170. Archived from the original on 2023-03-26.
- National Rifle Association (1875a). "Prize List and Details of Shooting". Proceedings of the National Rifle Association: 215–222. Archived from the original on 2023-03-26.
- National Rifle Association (1875b). "Tables showing winners of principal prizes since 1860". Proceedings of the National Rifle Association: 127–209. Archived from the original on 2023-03-26.
- National Rifle Association (2021). The NRA Handbook (PDF). Archived from the original (PDF) on 2023-03-24.
- National Rifle Association (2022). "Imperial Meeting Results". Archived from the original on 2023-03-26.
- National Rifle Association (2023). "Imperial Meeting Results". Archived from the original on 2024-07-27.
- National Rifle Association (2024). "Imperial Meeting Results".
- National Rifle Association (2025). "Imperial Meeting Results". Archived from the original on 2025-07-28.
- "Oxford and Cambridge". North Devon Gazette. 1893-07-25. p. 6.
- "Oxford Lay Bisley Bogey". Dundee Chronicle. 1936-07-14. p. 9.
- "Oxford Regain Trophy from Light Blues at Bisley". Aberdeen Press and Journal. 1939-07-21. p. 10.
- "An Oxford Win at Bisley". Oxfordshire Weekly News. 1914-07-22. p. 6.
- Oxford University Rifle Club (2020). "OURC Varsities". Oxford University Rifle Club.
- Oxford University Rifle Club (2019). "Heslop and Bentata 2019". Oxford University Rifle Club.
- Oxford University Rifle Club (2018). "Oxford University Rifle Club: Annual Newsletter 2017–2018" (PDF). Archived from the original (PDF) on 2023-03-26.
- Oxford University Rifle Club (2017). "OURC: Annual Newsletter 2016–2017" (PDF).
- "Rifle Team Beats Cambridge University in Decisive Meet". The Crimson. Harvard University. 1952-03-10. Archived from the original on 2023-03-24.
- Plummer, Mark (2020-03-09). "Shooting: Soke Target Sports Club provide the stage for a University Challenge with a difference". The Hunts Post. Archived from the original on 2023-03-26.
- "Schoolboys at Bisley". Yorkshire Post and Leeds Intelligencer. 1937-07-13. p. 20.
- Sevenoaks School (2016-02-27). "Shooting success vs Cambridge University Rifle Club". Archived from the original on 2023-03-26.
- "Shooting at Bisley". Irish News and Belfast Morning News. 1914-07-25. p. 6 – via British Newspaper Archive.
- "Shooting at Bisley". Oxford Chronicle and Reading Gazette. 1923-07-20. p. 24.
- Smith Archive (2020-05-06). "Cambridge beat Oxford in annual rifle match in London". Archived from the original on 2023-03-26.
- "Undergraduates at Bisley: Oxford Win". Portsmouth Evening News. 1939-07-21. p. 12.
- "The University and Rifle Shooting: Oxford Wins the Humphry Cup". Oxford Chronicle and Reading Gazette. 1921-07-15. p. 20.
- University of Cambridge Sport (2020). "Smallbore Club & Rifle Association". University of Cambridge Sport. Archived from the original on 2023-03-24.
- University of Cambridge Sport (2016). "Rifle Association" (PDF). University of Cambridge Sports Yearbook 2016. p. 112.
- University of Cambridge Sport (2015a). "Revolver and Pistol Club" (PDF). University of Cambridge Sports Yearbook 2015. p. 202. Archived from the original (PDF) on 2023-03-11.
- University of Cambridge Sport (2010). "Small Bore Club" (PDF). University of Cambridge Sports Yearbook 2013. p. 97. Archived from the original (PDF) on 2023-03-11.
- University of Cambridge Sport (2011b). "Small Bore Club" (PDF). University of Cambridge Sports Yearbook 2013. p. 86. Archived from the original (PDF) on 2023-03-11.
- University of Cambridge Sport (2011a). "Revolver and Pistol Club" (PDF). University of Cambridge Sports Yearbook 2013. pp. 75–76. Archived from the original (PDF) on 2023-03-11.
- University of Cambridge Sport (2012b). "Small Bore Club" (PDF). University of Cambridge Sports Yearbook 2013. p. 97. Archived from the original (PDF) on 2023-03-26.
- University of Cambridge Sport (2012a). "Revolver and Pistol Club" (PDF). University of Cambridge Sports Yearbook 2013. pp. 79–80. Archived from the original (PDF) on 2023-03-26.
- University of Cambridge Sport (2013b). "Small-Bore Club" (PDF). University of Cambridge Sports Yearbook 2013. pp. 90–91. Archived from the original (PDF) on 2023-03-26.
- University of Cambridge Sport (2013a). "Revolver and Pistol Club" (PDF). University of Cambridge Sports Yearbook 2013. pp. 80–81. Archived from the original (PDF) on 2023-03-26.
- University of Cambridge Sport (2014b). "Small-Bore Club" (PDF). University of Cambridge Sports Yearbook 2014. p. 97. Archived from the original (PDF) on 2023-03-11.
- University of Cambridge Sport (2014a). "Revolver and Pistol Club" (PDF). University of Cambridge Sports Yearbook 2014. p. 83. Archived from the original (PDF) on 2023-03-11.
- University of Cambridge Sport (2015b). "Small-Bore Club" (PDF). University of Cambridge Sports Yearbook 2015. pp. 120–121. Archived from the original (PDF) on 2023-03-11.

=== Other sources ===
- Abbott, Robert Lamb (1887), The Muster Roll of the 1st (Oxford University) V. B.: The Oxfordshire Light Infantry from 1859 to 1887, Oxford
- Atkinson, Thomas Dinham (1897). Cambridge Described & Illustrated: Being a Short History of the Town and University. London: MacMillan and Company.
- Cambridge University Revolver and Pistol Club (2022-11-08). "About the Club". Cambridge University Revolver and Pistol Club. Archived from the original on 2023-03-25.
- Capturing Cambridge (2020). "University Rifle Ground". Archived from the original on 2022-10-03.
- Doyle, John Andrew (1897). "Ross, Horatio" . In Lee, Sidney (ed.). Dictionary of National Biography. Vol. 49. London: Smith, Elder & Co. pp. 264–265.
- Humphry, A.P.; Fremantle, T.F. (1914). History of the National Rifle Association During Its First Fifty Years, 1859–1909. Bowes.
- Lyttelton, Robert Henry (1913). Fifty Years of Sport at Oxford, Cambridge and the Great Public Schools. Vol. 2. London: W. Southwood. OCLC 3887798.
- Manxman Publishing (2013-05-16). "About Fullbore". Stock Exchange Rifle Club. Archived from the original on 2023-03-24.
- Oates, Matthew (2022). His Imperial Majesty: A Natural History of The Purple Emperor. London: Bloomsbury. ISBN 9781472950161.
- Old Blundellian Club (2022). "OB Club: Shooting". Old Blundellian Club. Archived from the original on 2023-03-26.
- Ordnance Survey (1952). Cambridgeshire Sheet XLVII.NW (Map). Ordnance Survey Six-Inch England and Wales. Archived from the original on 2015-10-16.
- O'Shea, Callum (2022-07-22). "CURA Captain wins highly coveted Queen's Prize!". University of Cambridge Sport. University of Cambridge. Archived from the original on 2023-03-24.
- Paige, Donald (1960). A Map of Cambridge (Map). W. Heffer.
- Pizer, Robin (2009). "The English VIII Clubhouse". The English Eight Club. Archived from the original on 2023-03-24.
- Robinson, Phillip T.; Flacke, Gabriella L.; Hentschel, Knut M. (2017). The Pygmy Hippo Story: West Africa's Enigma of the Rainforest. Oxford University Press. ISBN 9780190611859.
- "Sports Reference: Philip Richardson". Sports Reference. 2008. Archived from the original on 2020-04-18.
