= George Murray Humphry =

English professor and surgeon (1820–1896)

Sir George M. Humphry FRS
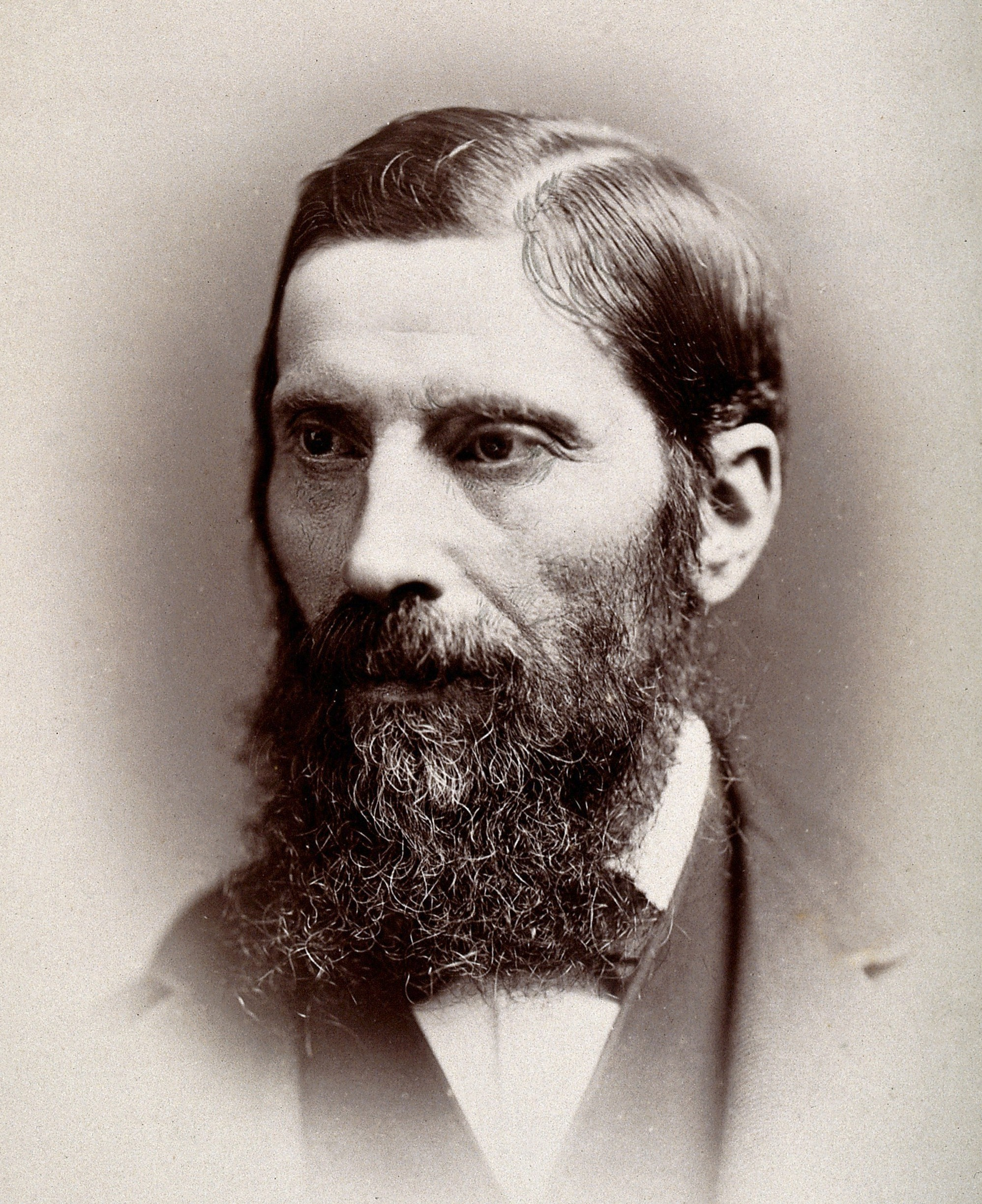
- George Murray Humphry in 1881
- Born: 18 July 1820; Sudbury, Suffolk
- Died: 24 September 1896 (aged 76); Cambridge
- Education: London University; Downing College, Cambridge
- Occupation: Professor of human anatomy
- Known for: Fellow of the Royal Society; Hunterian orator; Rede Lecture
- Children: Alfred Paget Humphry (son)

Sir George Murray Humphry, FRS (18 July 1820 – 24 September 1896) was an English professor of physiology and anatomy at the University of Cambridge, surgeon, gerontologist and medical writer.

== Life ==
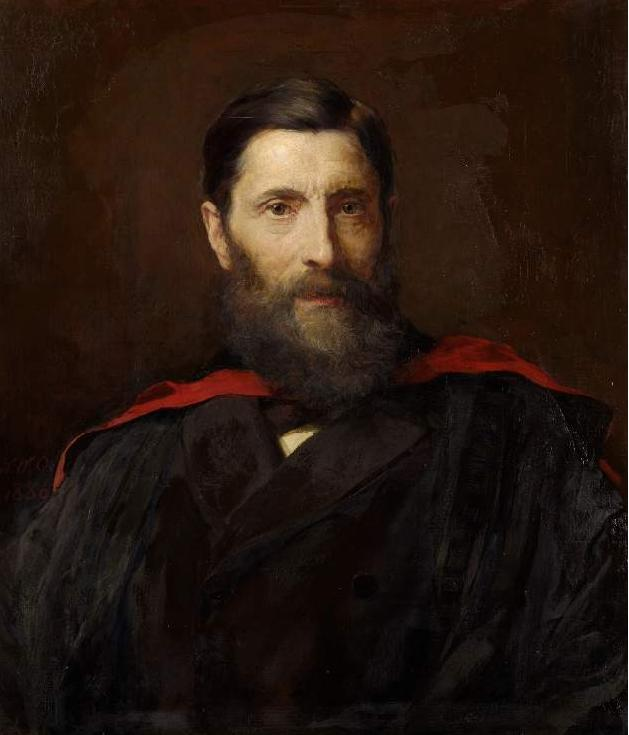
George Murray Humphry, portrait by Walter William Ouless

He was born at Sudbury in Suffolk on 18 July 1820, the third son of William Wood Humphry, a barrister. He was educated at the grammar schools of Sudbury and Dedham, and in 1836 he was apprenticed to John Green Crosse, surgeon to the Norfolk and Norwich Hospital. In 1839 he left Norwich and entered as a student at St Bartholomew's Hospital in London, where he came under the influence of Peter Mere Latham, William Lawrence, and James Paget. He passed the first M.B. examination at the London University in 1840, obtaining the gold medal in anatomy and physiology; but did not present himself for the final examination.

He was admitted a member of the Royal College of Surgeons of England on 19 November 1841, and on 12 May 1842 he became a licentiate of the Society of Apothecaries. In the same year three of the surgeons at Addenbrooke's Hospital, Cambridge, resigned their posts, and on 31 October 1842 Humphry was placed third out of six candidates in a contested election for the vacant posts. This appointment made him the youngest hospital surgeon in England.

He began to give clinical lectures and systematic teaching in surgery. In 1847 he was invited to act as deputy to the professor of anatomy, and he gave the lectures and demonstrations on human anatomy from 1847 to 1866. He entered himself a fellow-commoner at Downing College, Cambridge in 1847, graduating M.B. in 1852 and M.D. in 1859. After the retirement of William Clark, professor of human and comparative anatomy, in 1866, the duties of the chair were recast, and Humphry was elected professor of human anatomy in the university. He held this office until 1883, when he resigned it for the newly founded but unpaid professorship of surgery.

In 1869 he succeeded George Edward Paget, who was then elected president of the council, as the representative of the University of Cambridge on the General Medical Council. In 1880 he delivered the Rede Lecture of the university of Cambridge, taking Man, Past, Present, and Future as the subject of his address. He served on the council of the senate of the university, he was an honorary fellow of Downing, and in 1884 he was elected a professorial fellow of King's College, Cambridge.

At the Royal College of Surgeons of England Humphry filled numerous offices. Elected a fellow on 26 August 1844, when he was still a year below the statutory age, he served as a member of the council from 1864 to 1884, was Arris and Gale lecturer on anatomy and physiology from 1871 to 1873, a member of the court of examiners from 1877 to 1887, and Hunterian orator in 1879. He declined to be nominated for the offices of vice-president and president.

He was elected a Fellow of the Royal Society in 1859, and he served on the council of this society 1870–1. He was long a member of the British Medical Association. In 1867 he presided over the physiological section of the British Association for the Advancement of Science, and in 1870 he gave six lectures on the architecture of the human body as a part of the Fullerian course at the Royal Institution. He took an active part in the formation of the Cambridge Medical Society, and for some time was president. He presided at the annual meetings of the Sanitary Institute of Great Britain, held in London in 1882 and in Glasgow in 1883. In 1887 he was the first president of the Anatomical Society of Great Britain and Ireland, and he served as president of the Pathological Society of London during the years 1891–3. He was knighted in 1891.

Humphry died at his residence, Grove Lodge, on 24 September 1896, and is buried at the Mill Road Cemetery, Cambridge. A bust by Wiles was presented to Addenbrooke's Hospital by the vice-chancellor of the university. A portrait by Miss K. M. Humphry, painted on the occasion of the enrolment of Humphry as a freeman of his native town, was in the public hall at Sudbury, Suffolk.

== Works ==
As an anatomist he was one of the earliest workers who attempted to bring human anatomy into line with morphology. He was the first surgeon in England to remove successfully a tumour from the male bladder. His works were:

- A Treatise on the Human Skeleton, including the Joints’, Cambridge, 1858; the plates were drawn by his wife.
- On the Coagulation of the Blood in the Venous System during Life, Cambridge, 1859.
- The Human Foot and the Human Hand, Cambridge and London, 1861.
- Observations in Myology, Cambridge and London, 1872.
- Cambridge: the Town, University, and Colleges, Cambridge, 1880.
- Old Age: the Results of Information received respecting nearly Nine Hundred Persons who had attained the Age of Eighty Years, including Seventy-four Centenarians, Cambridge, 1889.

Humphry was also founder and co-editor (with Sir William Turner, M.D.) of the Journal of Anatomy and Physiology, Cambridge and London, 1866.

== Family ==
He married, in September 1849, Mary, daughter of Daniel Robert McNab, surgeon, of Epping, by whom he had a daughter and one son, Alfred Paget Humphry, senior Esquire Bedell of the University of Cambridge.
