= Nkalu =

Village in Imo state, Nigeria

Coordinates: 5°24′N 7°40′E

Nkalu, is a village in southeastern Nigeria. It is located near the city of Owerri.
