= Glossary of target rifle terms =

This is a basic glossary of target rifle terms that includes both technical terminology and jargon developed over the years in the sport of target rifle. Where words in a sentence are also defined elsewhere in this article, they appear in italics.

== B ==
Bisley
The main British target rifle range complex. It is considered the 'spiritual home' of target rifle, and hosts the prestigious Imperial Meeting every year.
Bull
The central blackened portion of a target that appears as a dot to the shooter taking aim. It may also refer to the score achieved when a shot lands in the centre of the target.
Butt
Natural or man-made earthwork which sits behind the targets, with the purpose of stopping bullets travelling beyond the range. It is often made of sand. It may also refer to the rear end of a rifle or shotgun stock that rests against the shoulder.

== F ==
Firing point
The area within which competitors lie to shoot at their targets. It is usually covered in grass and at a set distance from the target. It is also divided into individual lanes or targets.

== H ==
Hit
Score achieved when a shot lands in the 1 ring of the target.

== I ==
Inner
Score achieved when a shot lands in the 4 ring of the target.

== M ==
Magpie
Score achieved when a shot lands in the 3 ring of the target. The term originates from 1877, from the marking system used by the British National Rifle Association between 1874 and 1890. The disc used to mark the shot-hole was coloured according to the score: a white disc for a bullseye (five points), a red disc for a centre (four points), a black-and-white disc for an inner (three points) and a black disc for an outer (two points). In reference to the colour of the disk, the three-point ring was renamed "magpie" in 1877, with the term "inner" used for the four-point ring. In modern times, the term is often said to reflect the fact that NRA short-range targets (up to 600 yards) have a black ring for the three-point area, while long-range targets (from 800 yards) have it in white.
Miss
Score achieved when a shot misses the target, scoring 0.

== N ==
NRA
Abbreviation of National Rifle Association.
National Rifle Association
The British national governing body for target rifle.

== O ==
Outer
Score achieved when a shot lands in the 2 ring of the target.

== R ==
RCO
Abbreviation of Range Conducting Officer.
Range Conducting Officer
Official responsible for the management, following of rules and safety on a range.

== V ==
V-Bull
Score achieved when a shot lands in the central bullseye ring of the target, scoring 5.1 points. If scores are tied, the shooter with the highest number of v-bulls wins; hence v-bulls are often written as "5.1" (but do not add to make points: so a score of 75 with eleven v-bulls is written as "75.11")

== See also ==
- Glossary of firearms terms
- Fullbore target rifle
