= Robert Lyttelton =

English cricketer

Personal information
- Full name: The Hon Robert Henry Lyttelton
- Born: 18 January 1854; Westminster, London, England
- Died: 7 November 1939 (aged 85); North Berwick, East Lothian, Scotland
- Height: 6 ft 2 in (1.88 m)
- Batting: Right-handed
- Bowling: Underarm

Domestic team information
- Years: Team
- 1871–1881: Gentlemen of Worcestershire
- 1873–1874: Marylebone Cricket Club
- First-class debut: 19 May 1873 England XI v Cambridge University
- Last First-class: 2 September 1880 I Zingari v Yorkshire

Career statistics
Competition	First-class
Matches	7
Runs scored	67
Batting average	6.09
100s/50s	0/0
Top score	27
Balls bowled	60
Wickets	1
Bowling average	31.00
5 wickets in innings	0
10 wickets in match	0
Best bowling	1/27
Catches/stumpings	2/–
- Source: , 26 November 2011

Robert Henry Lyttelton (18 January 1854 – 7 November 1939) was an English cricketer who appeared in seven first-class matches between 1873 and 1880. A member of the Lyttelton family who were prominent in English cricket in the mid to late 1800s, he did not play county cricket, but appeared for a number of representative sides, in which players were often chosen more for their social status than their cricketing ability. In his later years he was known for his views about sportsmanship in cricket, and he successfully campaigned for changes in the laws of the game to penalise blocking the wicket with the legs. He published two books about cricket and collaborated with others on two more.

== Early life and cricket career ==
Robert Henry Lyttelton was born in Westminster, London on 18 January 1854, the sixth son of George Lyttelton, 4th Baron Lyttelton and his first wife Mary, née Glynne. He was educated at Eton, where he excelled as a sportsman. He was in Oppidan Wall and Keeper of Fives, and played a number of cricket matches for the school during his time there. They included the annual fixture against Harrow in both 1871 and 1872; which Eton won in both years. After leaving Eton he attended Trinity College, Cambridge, from which he graduated with a Bachelor of Arts degree (BA) in 1875 and received his Master of Arts (MA) in 1878. He did not play for Cambridge University, but six of his seven first-class matches were played against the University at Fenner's.

He made his debut in first-class cricket in 1873 for an "England XI", batting at number ten in the first innings, in which he scored two runs, and opening the batting in the second innings, remaining not out with three runs when his team achieved victory; fellow opener Charles Thornton scored 27 runs in the innings. He played in two further first-class matches that year, all in May and all against Cambridge; in the third match, once again representing an "England XI", he claimed his solitary wicket in first-class cricket, dismissing Thomas Latham bowled. Lyttelton reached his highest score in first-class matches the following year for the same side, scoring 27 runs while batting at number ten (in a twelve-per-side contest). He did not appear in first-class cricket in 1875, but returned to Cambridge in 1876, the year after his graduation, to appear for the Gentlemen of England. Playing for the Cambridge side in that match were two of his brothers, Edward and Alfred. The Gentlemen won the match by three wickets, but Edward and Alfred outperformed their brother, who did not bowl, and scored one run in his only batting innings. The Times said of him, "'Bob' Lyttelton, though not famous as a cricketer like some of his brothers owing to a certain slowness of foot, was a close student and an able critic of the game".

Despite playing just seven first-class matches, Lyttelton played a number of cricket matches that were not afforded that prestigious status. He played for the "Gentlemen of Worcestershire", a forerunner to Worcestershire County Cricket Club, and made his debut for them in a match against the "Gentlemen of Herefordshire" while still at Eton. He played alongside three of his brothers during this match; Neville; Arthur and Edward. In an 1874 match for Worcestershire against the Marylebone Cricket Club (MCC), he played as wicket-keeper, and took five catches in the second innings, four of them off the bowling of his brother Alfred, who went on to keep wicket in Test cricket for England. In addition to appearing for Worcestershire, he played for a number of amateur sides, such as the MCC, Free Foresters and I Zingari, for whom he was playing in his final first-class match in 1880.

Lyttelton was a strong believer that blocking the wicket with the legs was unsportsmanlike, and battled to outlaw the manoeuvre for over thirty years, even going so far as suggesting that if the ball strikes any part of the batsman at all in front of the stumps then he should be given out. In his 1928 book The Crisis in Cricket and the "Leg Before Rule", Lyttelton claims that the "curse of modern cricket" is drawn matches, which are caused by artificial pitches and "the pernicious modern habit of covering the stumps with the legs".

== Later life ==
After leaving Cambridge Lyttelton studied farming, on the estate of Lord Wenlock at Escrick, near York. After two years he moved to Birmingham, where he was articled to the solicitors Milward and Co. He qualified as a solicitor in 1882 of which he later became a partner. On 14 July 1884 Lyttelton married the concert singer Edith Santley, daughter of the baritone Charles Santley. She retired from professional singing at the age of 24 when she married. After her death in February 1926, he married, on 19 July 1926, Olive Agneta Clarke. There were no children from either marriage.

Lyttelton joined the Birmingham law firm Brabazon Campbell in 1888, and in 1902 moved to London, joining the solicitors Stow, Preston and Co, which became Stow, Preston and Lyttelton. His nephew George Lyttelton wrote of him, "My uncle Bob was a solicitor – and far the stupidest of all the eight brothers. He did all the family business and cost them thousands through his blundering. … He had in his prime a certain flair for words (e.g. Cobden's match) and he loved rolling over his tongue words like 'reversionary legatee' though the family suspected he didn't know what either of them meant." The reference to "Cobden's match" is to Lyttelton's account of the University Match of 1870, published in the Badminton Library volume, Cricket (1888), which he co-edited with A. G. Steel. The piece was selected for inclusion in The Oxford Book of English Prose.

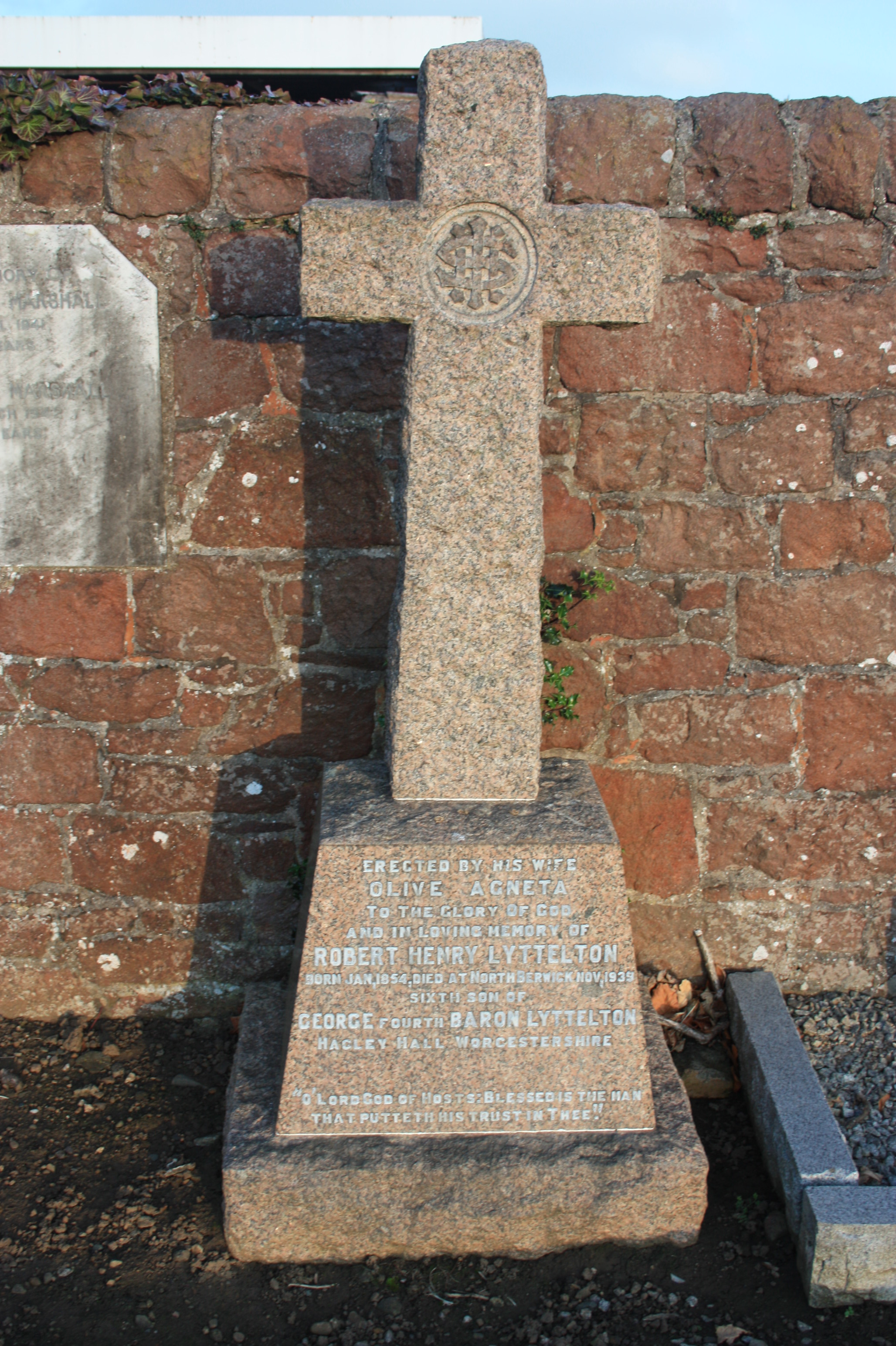
The grave of Robert Henry Lyttelton, North Berwick Cemetery

Lyttelton died on 7 November 1939 in North Berwick in Scotland. An obituarist in The Times wrote, "If cricket did not exist, Bob Lyttelton would have created it. If sportsmen still exist his ghost will give them substance." He is buried in North Berwick Cemetery on the east side of the town. The grave lies against the east boundary wall.

== Publications ==
- Lyttelton, Robert Henry; Steel, A. G. (1888). Cricket. London: Longmans, Green and Co. OCLC 4526814 – via Internet Archive.
- —; et al. (1899). Giants of the Game: being reminiscences of the stars of cricket from Daft down to the present day. London: Ward Lock & Co. OCLC 55774624.
- — (1901). Out-door Games; Cricket & Golf. London: J. M. Dent & Co. OCLC 5276627 – via Internet Archive.
- — (1913). Fifty Years of Sport at Oxford, Cambridge and the Great Public Schools (PDF). London: W. Southwood – via National Library of Scotland.
- — (1928). The Crisis in Cricket and the "Leg Before Rule.". London: Longmans. OCLC 15101993.
