= Shooting competitions for factory and service firearms =

Restricted shooting sports

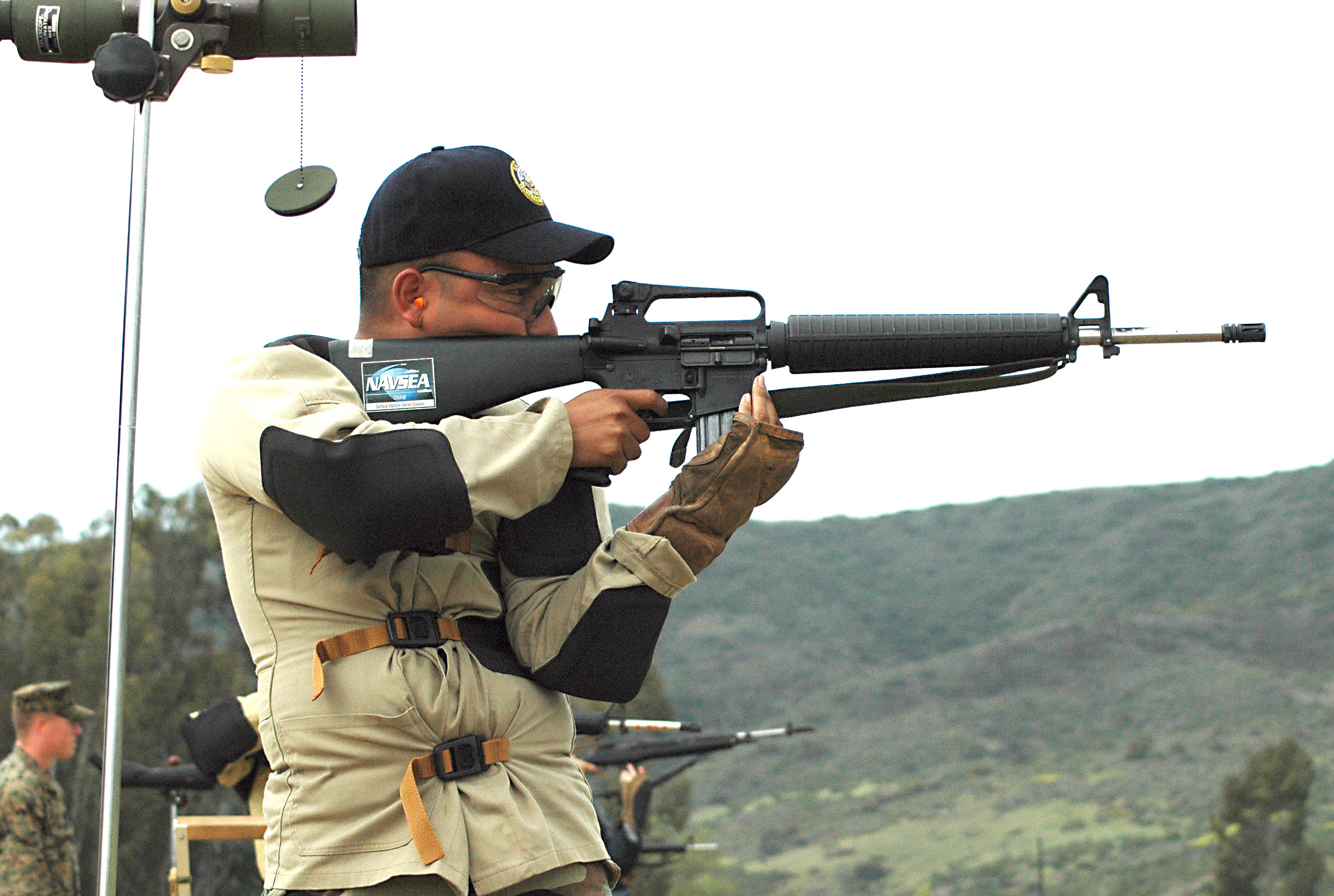
- Service rifle shooting in a standing position at a 2006 marksmanship competition in the U.S.
- Nicknames: Service rifle, Service pistol, Production, Factory, Stock

Characteristics
- Mixed-sex: Yes or no, depending on competition format
- Type: Shooting sport
- Equipment: Handgun or rifle
- Venue: Shooting range

Presence
- Olympic: No
- World Championships: No
- Paralympic: No

Shooting competitions for factory and service firearms refer to a set of shooting disciplines, usually called service rifle, service pistol, production, factory, or stock; where the types of permitted firearms are subject to type approval with few aftermarket modifications permitted. The terms often refer to the restrictions on permitted equipment and modifications rather than the type of match format. The names Service Rifle and Service Pistol stem from that the equipment permitted for these types of competitions traditionally were based on standard issue firearms used by one or several armed forces and civilian versions of these, while the terms production, factory and stock often are applied to more modern disciplines with similar restrictions on equipment classes.

Service firearm competitions can refer to whole disciplines like NRA Service Rifle by NRA in the U.S. and the Tir aux Armes Règlementaires competitions by the French Shooting Federation, or it can refer to a subset of equipment classes within one shooting discipline, such as the Production division in practical shooting, F-Class F/TR (Standard) in F-Class and several national disciplines within bullseye and field shooting. The types of handguns or rifles permitted for these types of competitions are often rugged, versatile and affordable compared to custom competition firearms used in separate equipment classes within the same type of shooting disciplines.

Equipment classes for factory or service firearms are usually restrictive in nature in that most modifications generally are prohibited, and upgrade and replacement parts usually must have been produced by the original equipment manufacturer (OEM). In comparison, other more open equipment classes usually are permissive in nature, permitting most equipment and modifications as long as the firearm still functions safely, while also satisfying some minimum requirements like for instance a weight limit, size restriction or a type of sights (i.e. any iron sights, red dot or scope sight).

== History ==
The modern ISSF 300 meter standard rifle event has roots dating back to at least the 19th century as a service rifle competition, and the early championships had a true army rifle event where the rifle model used was provided at the host country's choice. Today's format created in 1947 allows for custom firearms, and as such is no longer a service rifle competition. However, shooting disciplines requiring equipment type approval continues to enjoy large popularity in several other national and international disciplines due to simple equipment rules. For instance national service rifle competitions are popular in the United States by NRA, the United Kingdom by NRA UK and in Scandinavia.

== Disciplines ==
- The Production division in IPSC, USPSA and other practical shooting disciplines, where handguns used must be listed in a type approval list.
- The Standard class (F/TR) in ICFRA F-Class long range shooting, where the ammunition must be one of the type approved cartridges 7.62mm NATO or 5.56mm NATO.
- Civilian Service Rifle (CSR) in the U.K. by NRA UK.
- NRA Service Rifle in the U.S. by NRA, an equipment class within high power rifle.
- Nordic bullseye rifle and field rifle competitions by the National Rifle Association of Norway (DFS), the Danish Gymnastics and Sports Associations (DGI Shooting) and the Swedish Shooting Sport Association (SvSF).
- Tir aux Armes Règlementaires pistol and rifle competitions by the French Shooting Federation (FFTir).
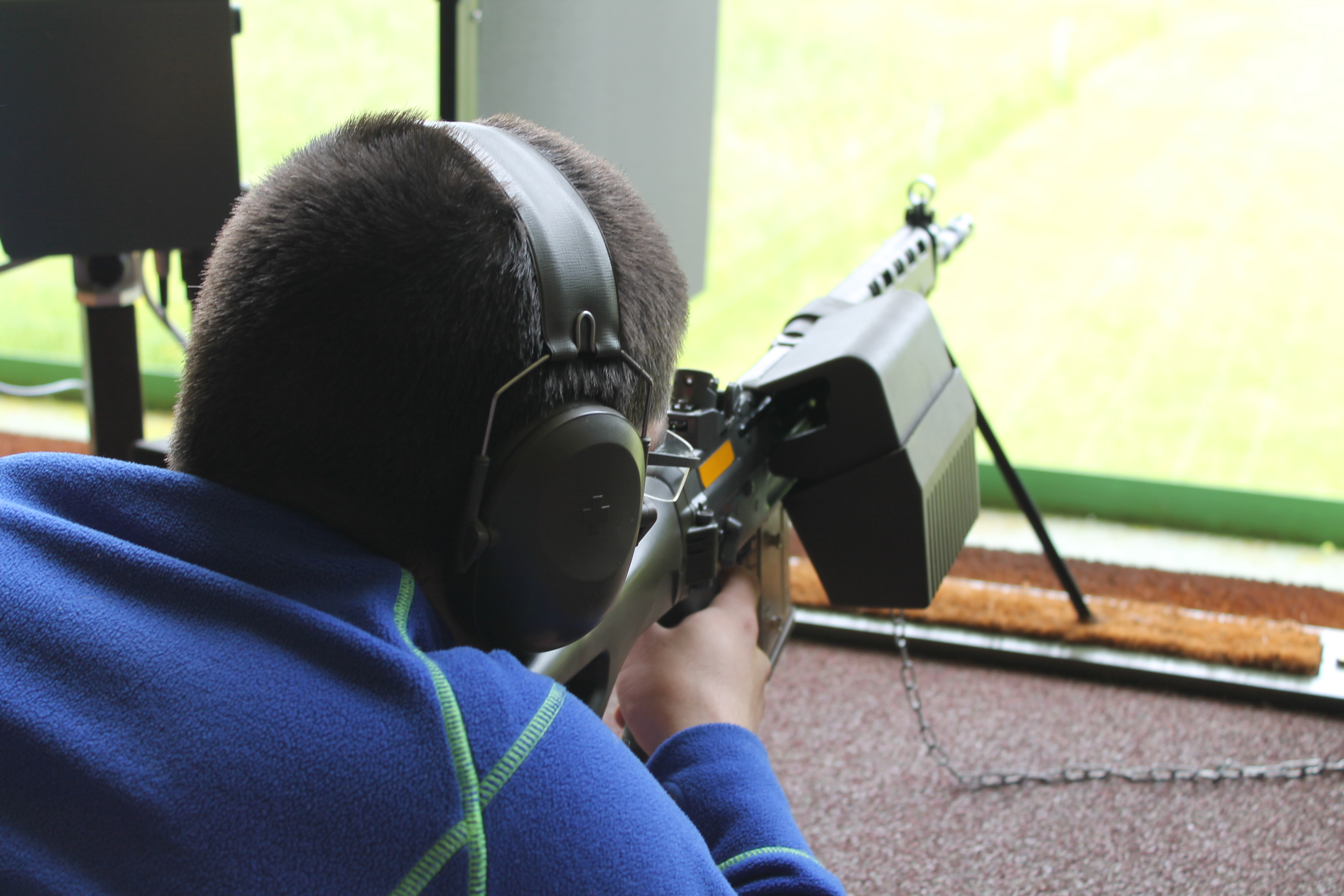
A junior shooter in Switzerland exercising bullseye shooting with a SIG 550. The rifle is equipped with a brass catcher to avoid disturbing other shooters with the ejection.

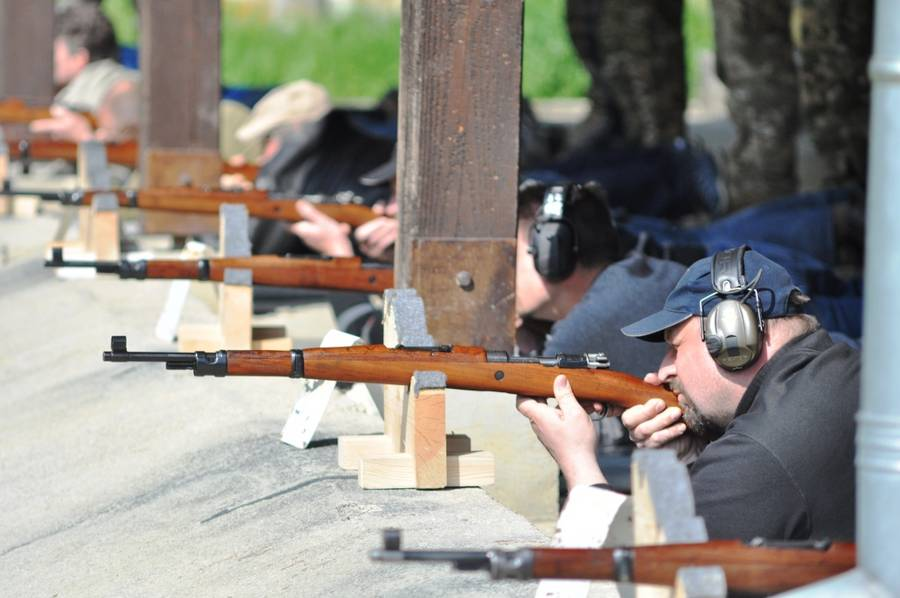
Service rifle shooting in Slovenia with the Zastava M48 rifle.

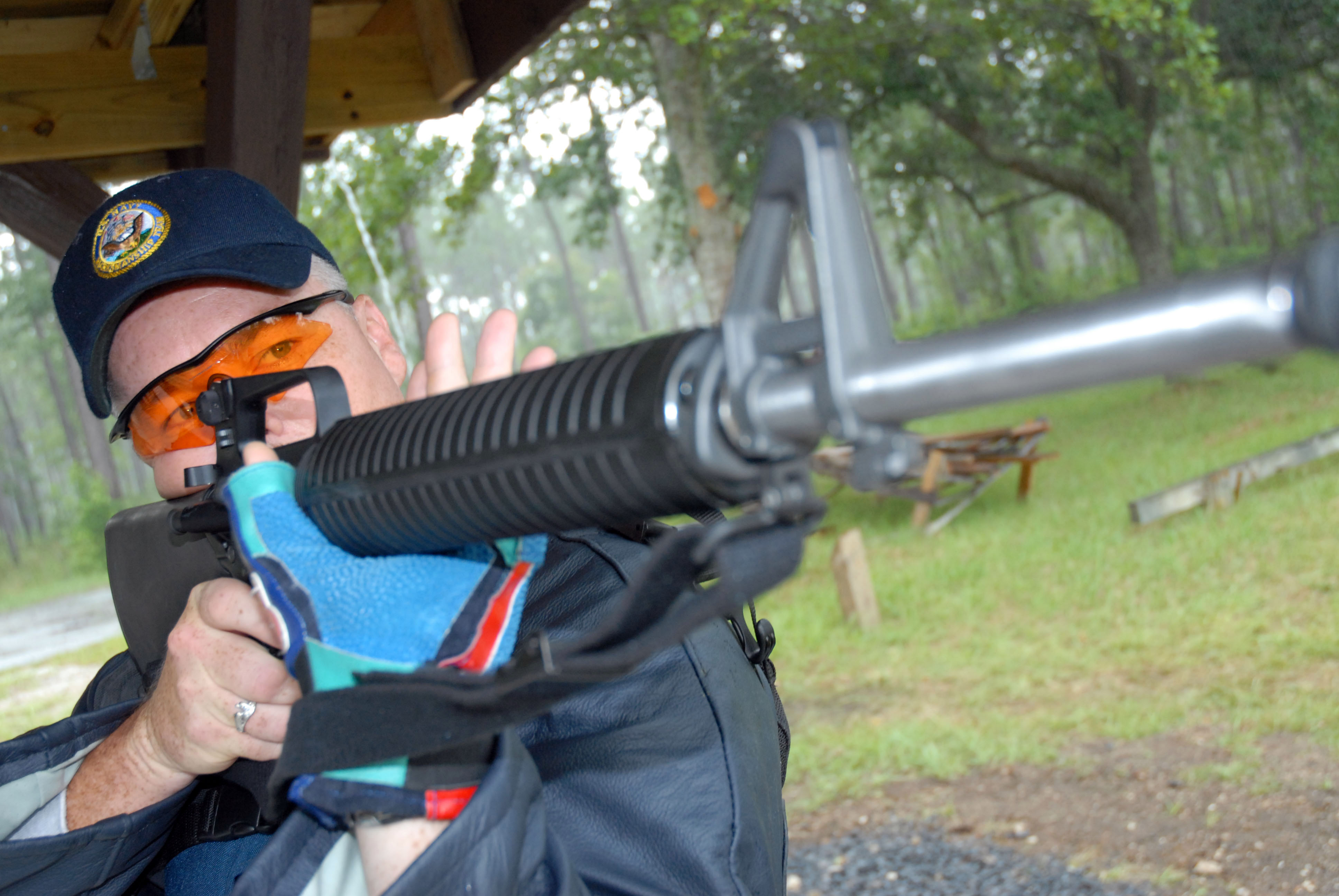
Service rifle shooting in United States with an M16/AR-15 style rifle.

== See also ==
- Marksmanship badges (United States)
- Civilian Marksmanship Program
