= Infanteriegewehr Modell 1842 =

Swiss service rifle

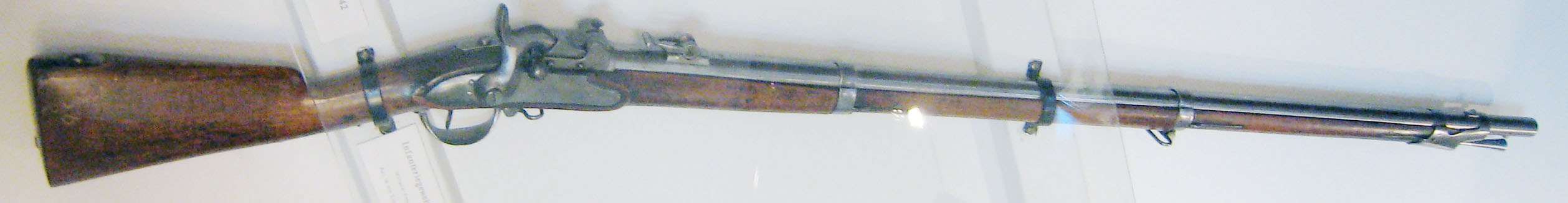
- Type: Service rifle
- Place of origin: Switzerland

Service history
- In service: 1842 – c. 1863 (Swiss service)
- Used by: Armies of the Swiss cantons South African Republic
- Wars: Sonderbund War; Second Boer War

Production history
- Manufacturer: Francotte Liège, Beuret Frères and others
- Variants: Modell 1842; Modell 1842/59 (T.59); Modell 1842/59/67 (T.67)

Specifications
- Mass: 4750 g
- Length: 1470 mm
- Barrel length: 1050 mm
- Caliber: 18 mm (1859 refit to 10.4 mm caliber)
- Action: Caplock
- Feed system: Muzzleloader breech loader (Milbank-Amsler conversion)
- Sights: Adjustable rear sight

The Infanteriegewehr Modell 1842 (English: Infantry rifle, type 1842) was one of the first standardised service rifles used by the Swiss armed forces. It was introduced in 1842 as a result of a decision by the authorities of the Old Swiss Confederacy to standardise the weapons of the then still separate armies of the Swiss Cantons. In 1859, the Swiss Federal Assembly authorized the conversion of infantry rifles.

== Milbank-Amsler conversion ==
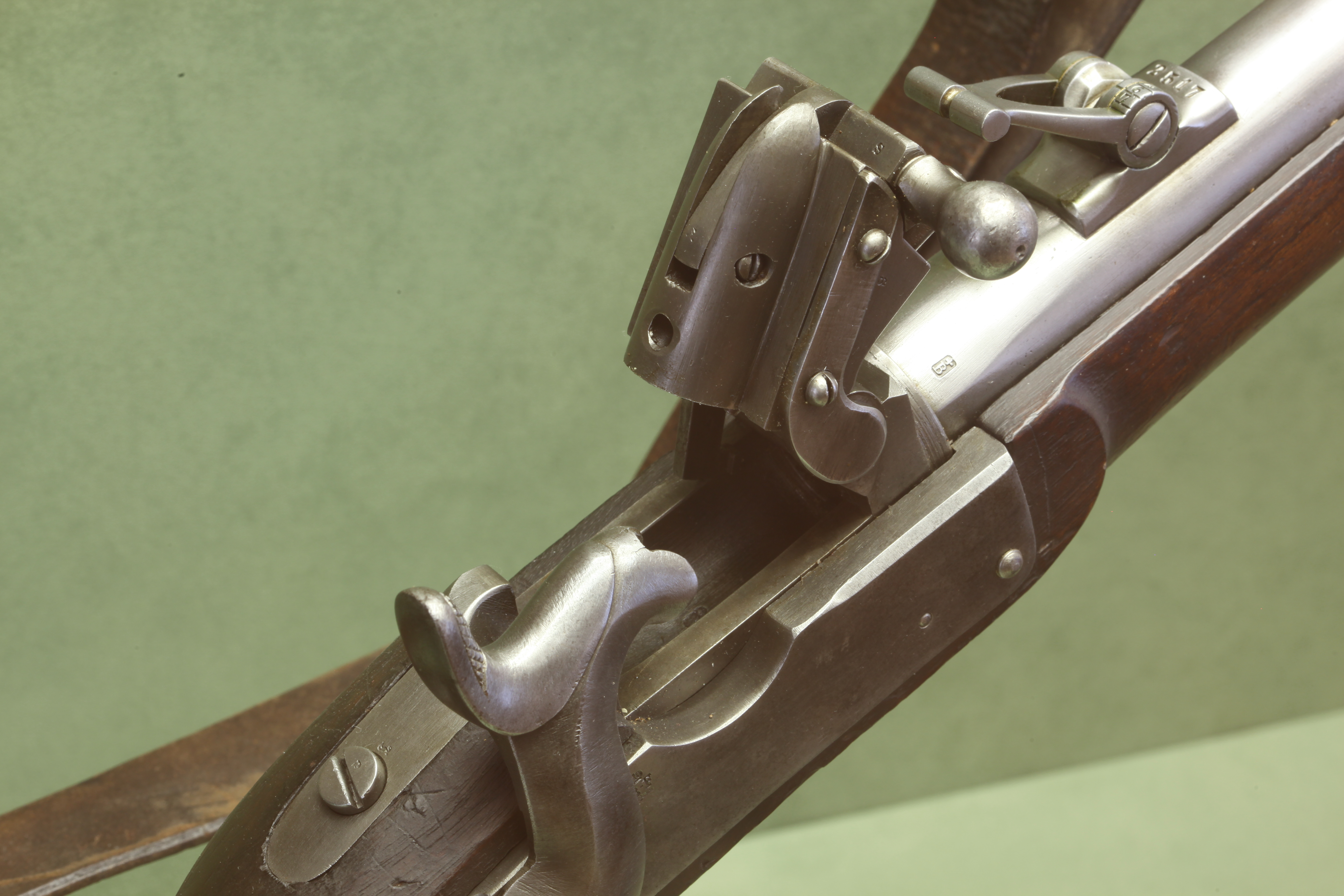
Modified rifle 1842/59/67

The weapon's barrel was rifled in 1859 (T.59) and then modernized again in 1867 (T.67) with a Milbank-Amsler receiver system to convert it to a breech loader. In 1867, the weaponry underwent a further round of modifications and optimization. This large-scale initiative involved the reconfiguration of over 100,000 rifles. The project was primarily driven by the findings of the Austro-Prussian War, known as German Civil War, which confirmed the tactical superiority of breech-loading firearms. The conversion to a breech-loading rifle in this particular model was carried out by the Sulzer company in Winterthur, which retrofitted just over 27,000 rifles.

This variant was used by the Boers during the Boer Wars.
