= Civilian Marksmanship Program =

American federally-chartered firearm marksmanship education program

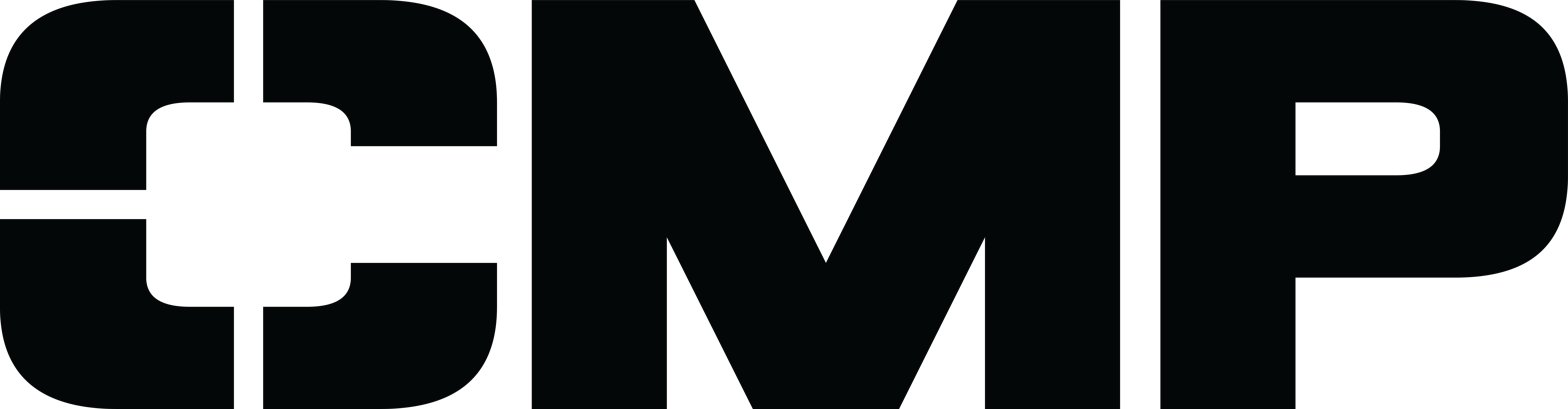
The Civilian Marksmanship Program logo, adopted in April 2025

The Civilian Marksmanship Program (CMP), legally the Corporation for the Promotion of Rifle Practice and Firearms Safety, Inc. (CPRPFS) and formerly the National Board for the Promotion of Rifle Practice (NBPRP), is an American federally-chartered nonprofit 501(c)(3) organization dedicated to training and educating U.S. citizens in the responsible use of firearms and airguns through gun safety training, marksmanship training, and competitions, with a focus on youth programs to help build life skills. The CMP also sells military surplus service rifles formerly used by the United States Armed Forces, airguns, and ammunition. The organization formally dates back to 1916, but the modern CMP was established in 1996.

The CMP operates through a network of affiliated private organizations, shooting clubs, and state associations across every U.S. state which variously offer firearms safety training and marksmanship courses as well as continued practice and competition events. The CPRPFS is a tax-exempt non-profit 501(c)(3) corporation chartered by the United States Congress, but is not an agency of the U.S. government (Title 36, United States Code, Section 40701 et seq.). Apart from a donation of outdated surplus rifles in the United States Army's inventory to the CMP for resale, the CMP receives no federal funding.

The CMP maintains three main offices: CMP North at Camp Perry near Port Clinton, Ohio; CMP South in Anniston, Alabama; and the CMP Talladega Marksmanship Park in Talladega, Alabama.

== History ==
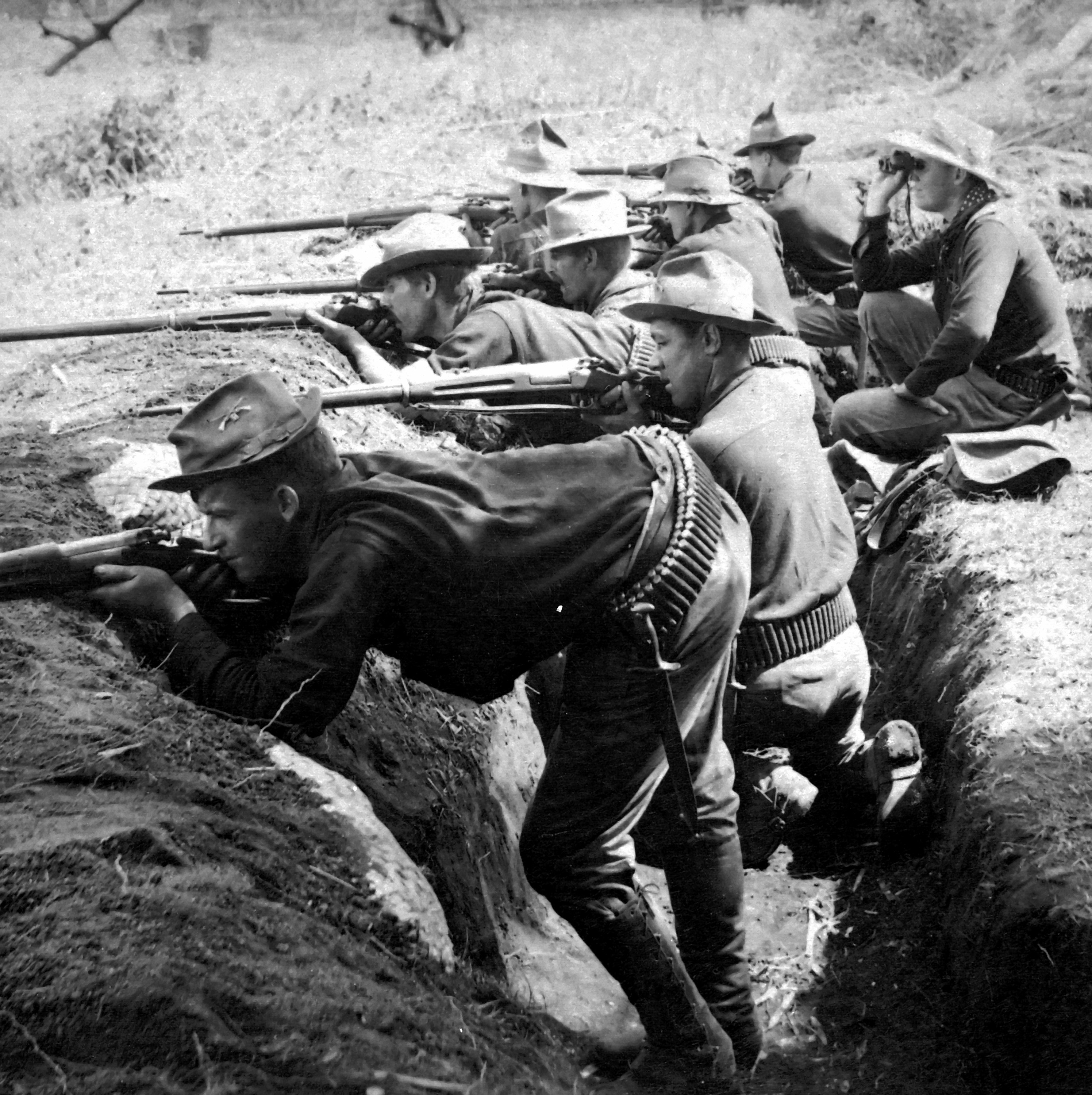
American soldiers aiming their Krag–Jørgensen rifles in 1899 during the Philippine–American War

The CMP originated from the War Department Appropriations Act of 1903, for the purpose of providing civilians an opportunity to learn and practice marksmanship skills should they later be called to serve in the U.S. military. The CMP's formation was precipitated by the military's adoption of the M1903 Springfield rifle which, compared to the preceding Springfield Model 1892–99, featured greatly increased range that facilitated longer-range combat and thus made accuracy and good marksmanship increasingly important. However, the rising urbanization of the Progressive Era, among other factors, led to a decline in long gun use among civilians; many Americans at the time, especially those in cities and suburbs, had no need to learn skills such as hunting, and thus most young Americans had never handled or fired a gun, while those who had were often more familiar with lever action rifles, not the modern bolt action rifles (such as the M1903) that were becoming increasingly popular with militaries across the world. Secretary of War Elihu Root advocated for creating a program to teach civilians how to use firearms and familiarize them with American service rifles before a conflict broke out, instead of having to train wholly inexperienced recruits after the fact.

The National Board for the Promotion of Rifle Practice (NBPRP), an advisory board to the Secretary of the Army, was formed to oversee this training of civilians. Board members were the Assistant Secretary of War, two U.S. Army officers, a U.S. Navy officer, a U.S. Marine Corps officer, eight trustees of the National Rifle Association, and eight civilians selected from various parts of the country. Following the outbreak of World War I in 1914, the NBPRP appointed Colonel S. W. Miller as the first Director of Civilian Marksmanship (DCM) on December 9, 1916. He established the office of the DCM on December 13, 1916 to act as an executive agent of the board.

From 1916 to 1996, the CMP was administered by the NBPRP. Title XVI of the National Defense Authorization Act for Fiscal Year 1996 created the Corporation for the Promotion of Rifle Practice and Firearms Safety (CPRPFS) to replace the NBPRP.

== Programs ==
The Civilian Marksmanship Program cartouche on an M1 Garand

The CMP facilitates training programs focused on promoting safety, responsibility, leadership, and competitive excellence in shooting sports. The organization supports, sponsors, and hosts various rifle and pistol competitions nationwide, such as the National Matches at Camp Perry. Previously, the CMP hosted the United States Olympic trials for ISSF 10 meter air rifle, and it currently hosts the annual Junior Olympic three-position air rifle matches along with several national junior championships. Throughout the year, the CMP conducts camps and clinics, including a summer camp program featuring standing air rifle, three-position air rifle, and three-position smallbore shooting events.

The CMP provides surplus U.S. Army rifles for sale, mostly consisting of historic outdated wood-furniture rifles used by the U.S. military between the 1890s and the 1950s, namely the Springfield Model 1892–99, M1903 Springfield, M1917 Enfield, M1 Garand, and M1 carbine. Since 2018, the CMP 1911 Program has included the M1911 pistol among the CMP's surplus offerings. The CMP also sells .22 caliber sport rifles, air rifles, air pistols, and a variety of ammunition, as well as parts, service, and select customization for different firearms. Any U.S. citizen not otherwise legally prohibited from owning a firearm may purchase a surplus firearm from the CMP provided they are a member of a CMP-affiliated club.

=== Competition Tracker ===
In July 2003, the CMP launched the Competition Tracker, an online results system for shooting sports. Originally designed specifically for the National Trophy matches, the CMP uses Competition Tracker as the official results bulletin of every CMP competition. During the March 2006 JROTC National Championships, the CMP used Competition Tracker alongside Sius Ascor electronic targets to provide real-time results online with a 45-second average delay.

== Military marksmanship badges ==
United States Armed Forces personnel are authorized to wear marksmanship competition badges by each service's regulations. These badges are awarded based on points earned at CMP-sponsored competitions or high placement at special CMP competitions. The following is a list of marksmanship competition badges authorized for wear on U.S. military service uniforms based on points earned at CMP competitions:

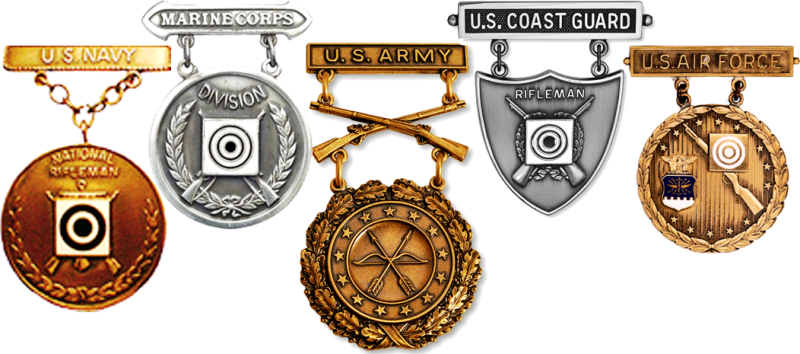
Example of different U.S. Armed Forces Excellence-in-Competition Badges awarded based on "leg points" earned at CMP sanctioned competitions

- U.S. Distinguished International Shooter Badge (All services)
- Distinguished Rifleman Badge (Army, Air Force, and U.S. Civilians)
- Distinguished Marksman Badge (Navy, Marine Corps, and Coast Guard)
- Distinguished Pistol Shot Badge (All services)
- President's Hundred Tab/Brassard (Army, Navy, and Coast Guard)
- Army Excellence In Rifle Competition Badge (Silver or Bronze)
- Army Excellence In Pistol Competition Badge (Silver or Bronze)
- Air Force Excellence In Rifle Competition Badge (Silver with Wreath or Bronze with Wreath)
- Air Force Excellence In Pistol Competition Badge (Silver with Wreath or Bronze with Wreath)
- Navy Excellence-in-Competition Rifle Badge (Gold, Silver, or Bronze)
  - National, Navy, and Fleet
- Navy Excellence-in-Competition Pistol Badge (Gold, Silver, or Bronze)
  - National, Navy, and Fleet
- Marine Corps Rifle Competition Badge (Gold, Silver, or Bronze)
  - National, Marine Corps, and Division
- Marine Corps Pistol Competition Badge (Gold, Silver, or Bronze)
  - National, Marine Corps, and Division
- Coast Guard Rifleman Excellence-in-Competition Badge (Silver or Bronze)
  - National and Coast Guard
- Coast Guard Pistol Shot Excellence in Competition Badge (Silver or Bronze)
  - National and Coast Guard

== See also ==
- High power rifle
- International Confederation of Fullbore Rifle Associations
- International Practical Shooting Confederation
- International Shooting Sport Federation
- National Rifle Association
- National Shooting Sports Foundation
- United States Army Marksmanship Unit
- United States Practical Shooting Association
