= High power rifle =

Shooting sport

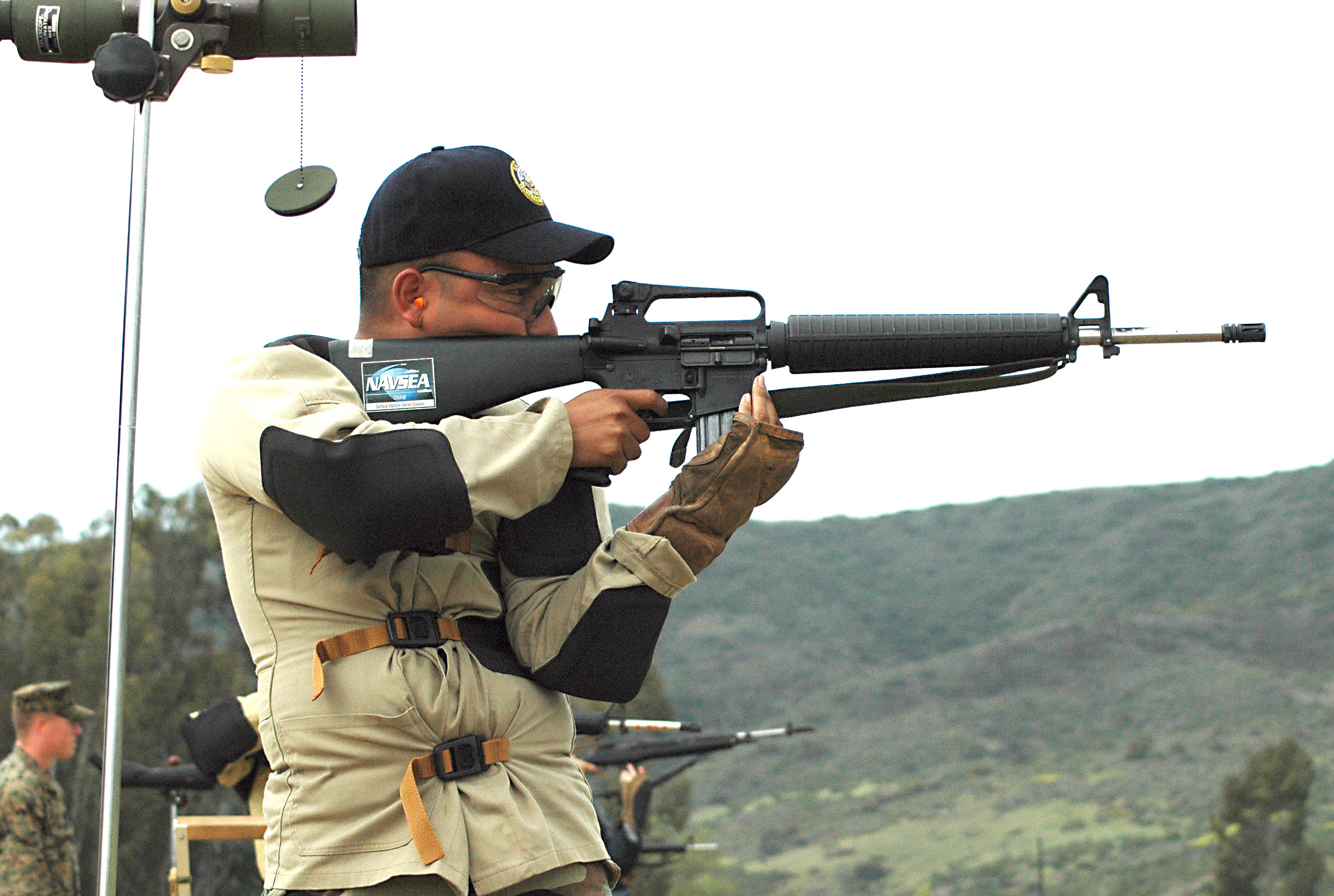
- Shooting in standing position at 500 yards (457.2 meters) at the 2006 Fleet Forces Command (Pacific) Rifle and Pistol Championships, where U.S. Sailors, Marines, Coast Guardsmen and civilians competed in team and individual divisions during an annual marksmanship competition.

Characteristics
- Team members: Yes
- Type: Shooting sport
- Equipment: Fullbore target rifles

High Power Rifle, also called XTC from "Across the Course", is a shooting sport using fullbore target rifles which is arranged in the United States by the National Rifle Association of America (NRA). The sport is divided into classes by equipment, and popular types of matches include Service Rifle (a service firearm competition), Open, Axis and Allies and metallic silhouette. The term High Power Rifle sometimes also includes the international shooting disciplines of Palma and F-Class by the International Confederation of Fullbore Rifle Associations (ICFRA) which are represented by the NRA in the United States.

== Match format ==
The National Match Course of fire for a high power rifle match has four (4) individual stages that comprise an aggregate match:

1. Stage 1: Offhand (Standing) Slow fire (10 shots in 10 minutes), 200 yards
2. Stage 2: Rapid fire (10 shots in 60 seconds with reload), sitting or kneeling, at 200 yards
3. Stage 3: Rapid fire (10 shots in 70 seconds with reload), prone, at 300 yards Shooters load 2 rounds in one magazine and 8 in the other, or 5 and 5 in some instances like match rifle.
4. Stage 4: Slow fire (20 shots in 20 minutes), prone, at 600 yards

There are also Regional Match formats consisting of 80 shots for record or a 100 shot format typically used in State Championship matches. When these formats are used, the same stages are used but there is an increase in the number of rounds fired.

== Scoring ==
Scoring combines from a total aggregate of 50 shots worth 500 points. In addition to points, "X" counts are also used to rank shooters in a match. In the center of each target (within the ten ring) is an "X" ring. If a competitor shoots within this ring they receive the ten points for shooting a ten, but also receive an additional "X" which serves as a tie breaker, if needed. For example, if one competitor ends a match with 487-14X (meaning 487 points with 14 X's) and another shooter ends with 487-20X, then the one that shot 20 X's will finish ahead of the one which only shot 14 X's.

== Equipment classes ==
=== Service Rifle ===
In service rifle matches, a competitor may use an M1 Garand style rifle, an M1A (M14) style rifle, an SR-25 (M110) style rifle, or an AR-15 (M16) style rifle. AR-15 rifles may use a scope up to 4.5 power. The Civilian Marksmanship Program (CMP) Matches also requires shooters to begin in the standing position before moving into the sitting, kneeling, or prone positions for the rapid-fire stages. This is based on the historical origins of military rifle matches and the need to improve and maintain proficiency with military arms for military members and ready civilians for service in times of national need. NRA competitions do not require a competitor to begin in the standing position.

In the 2016 revision of the Civilian Marksmanship Program's "Competition Rules for Service Rifle and Pistol", use of a magnification optic has been authorized, intended to represent the use of the Rifle Combat Optic (RCO) on today's M-16 and M-4 service rifles. Magnified optics are limited to a maximum 4.5x power, and can be of the fixed magnification or variable-zoom type. These optics will also be allowed during the National Matches, hosted in Camp Perry, Ohio. Use of collapsible buttstocks has also been allowed in the 2016 revision.

=== Open ===
In addition to service rifle matches, there are also other types of matches that are typically included in High Power Rifle shooting. These rifles can be fired in a match rifle category. Suitable centerfire rifles may be used, including civilian hunting rifles as well as foreign military rifles as long as they are safe and can meet caliber and magazine capacity requirements to complete the courses of fire. A rifle must have a minimum capacity of 5 rounds and be able to be loaded rapidly via a magazine or stripper clips to be a viable choice for competition use.

=== CMP Games Matches ===
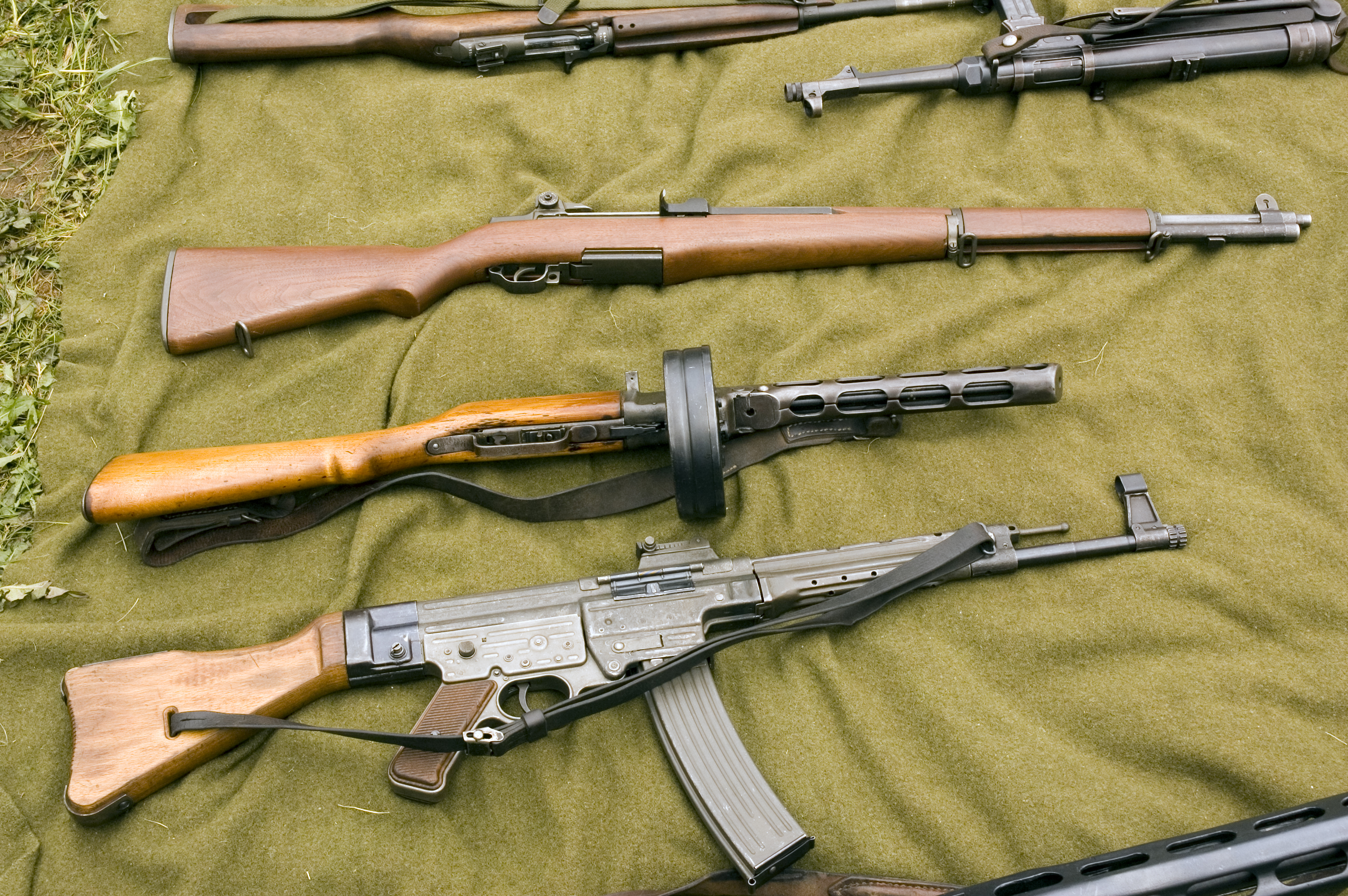
A U.S. M1 Garand, a Soviet PPsh-41 and a German Sturmgewehr 44.

Another style of popular matches is called CMP games. Such matches permit both US service rifles as well as foreign military rifles (e.g., Lee–Enfield, M1 Garand, Arisaka, etc.). These matches are governed by rules and scoring methods that are very similar to U.S. service rifle matches but are limited by the modifications that can be done to them and the distances they are shot. Games matches are shot typically at 200 yards for service rifles, and 100 yards for carbines. There is also a sniper match where period rifles or copies can be used. This is typically fired in a team format out to 600 yards distance.

=== Traditional ===
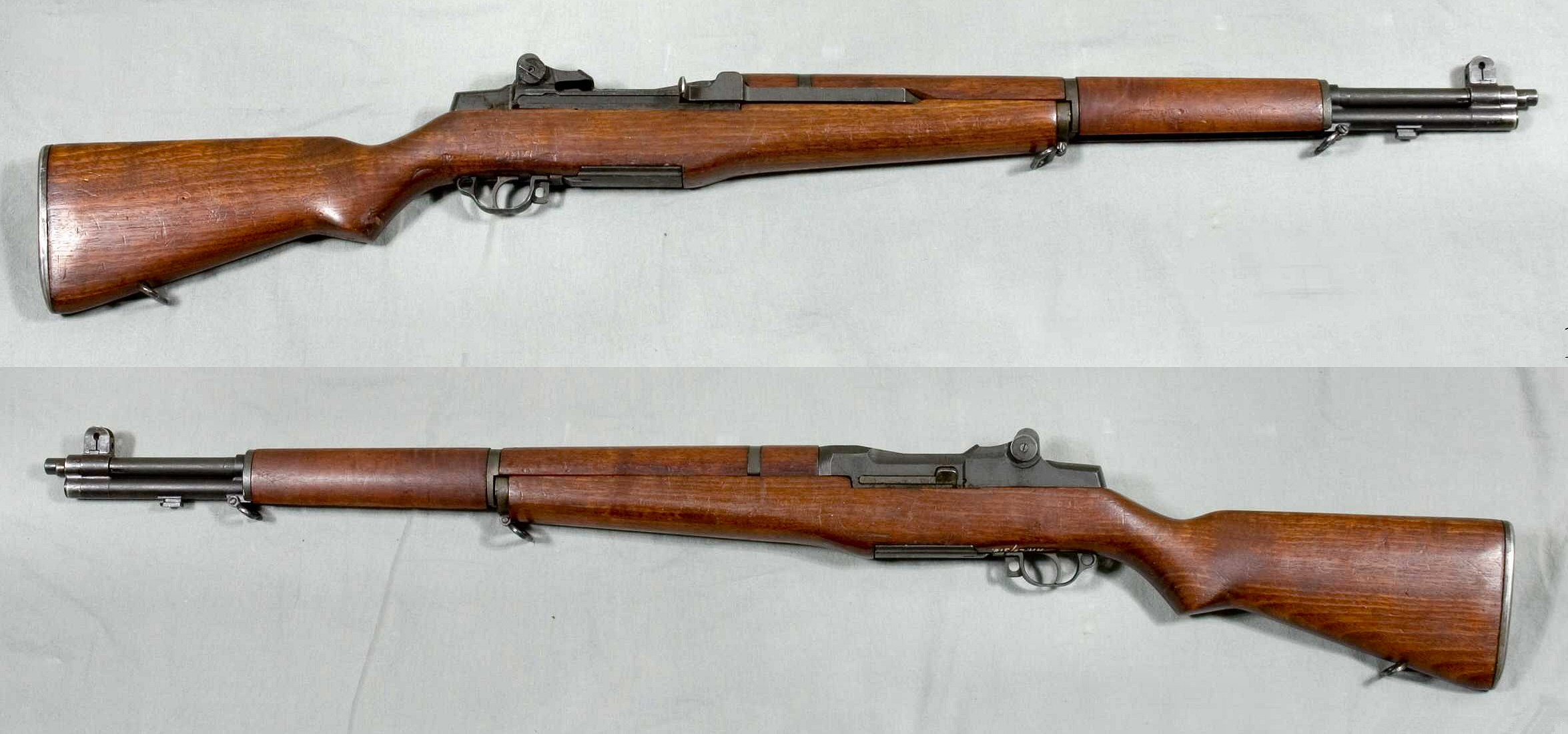
M1 Garand rifle

Traditional High Power Rifle shooting is most commonly done using a rifle with a military web or a Model 1907 leather sling, although custom slings for match rifle are available. A sling is required to be affixed to the rifle for all stages for service rifles. Shooters use a shooting mat, shooting jacket, and wear a specialized glove that is worn on the support hand to dampen pulse, felt recoil, and protect the support hand from the sling which can be very tight during use. The shooting is done at known distances of 100 to 1000 yards from the firing line depending on the format of the match. Some High Power Rifle matches are shot only at 200 yards, such as sometimes seen during specific M1 Garand matches, and Axis and Allies matches, although they are still shot from various positions (standing, sitting/kneeling, prone).

=== F-Class ===
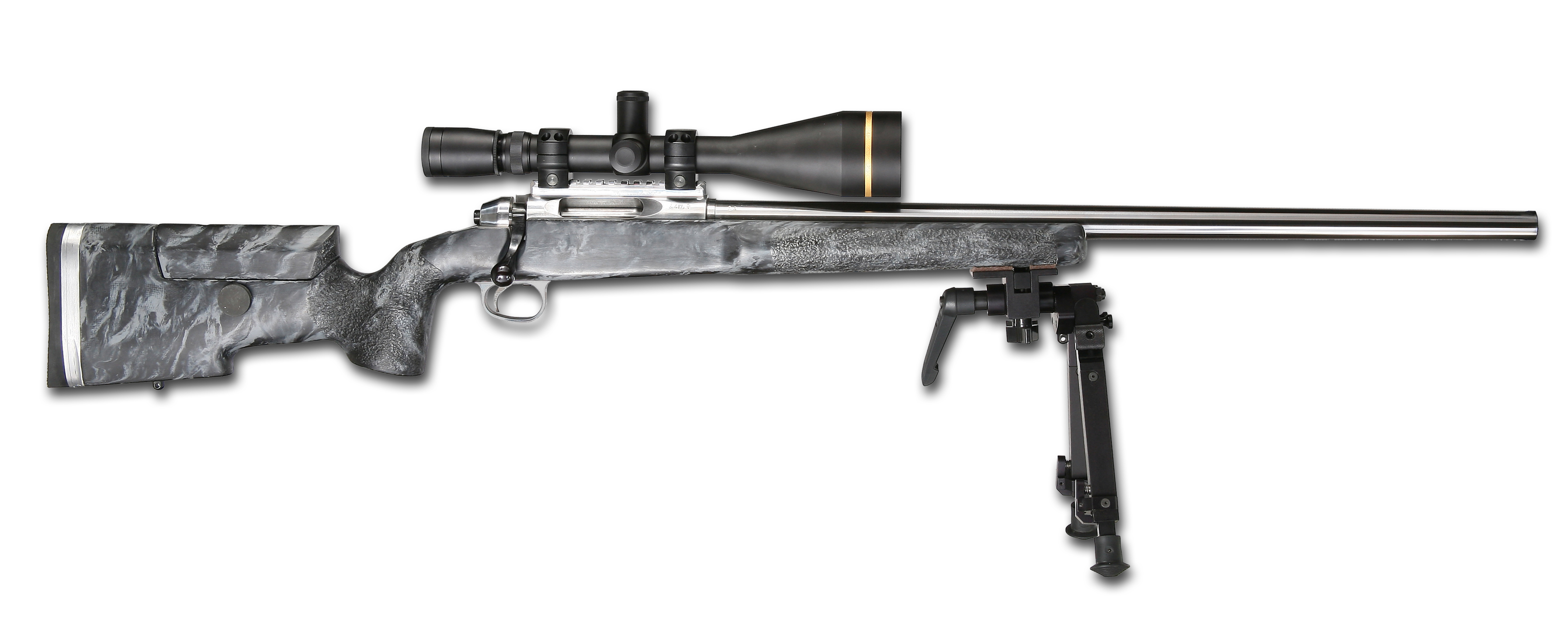
An F-Class Standard rifle with a scope and bipod.

Those matches involving F-Class shooting add additional options, permitting use of a bipod, as well as joystick-equipped rests similar to those used in bench rest shooting.

== Calibers ==
Popular calibers often seen in High Power Rifle matches include various .30 caliber rounds (e.g., .30-06, .308, .303 British, 7.62×39mm, 7.62×54mmR, etc.) In F-Class shooting, calibers even up to .35 are permitted.

== See also ==
- International Confederation of Fullbore Rifle Associations (ICFRA), the international sanctioning body of fullbore target rifle (Palma and F-Class)
- National Rifle Association of America
- Civilian Marksmanship Program
- Project Appleseed
- Marksmanship Badge (United States)
