= Long range shooting =

Shooting discipline

- Highest governing body: International Confederation of Fullbore Rifle Associations (ICFRA)
- Nicknames: Long range

Characteristics
- Equipment: Rifle
- Venue: Shooting range or in the terrain

Presence
- Olympic: No
- World Championships: Yes
- Paralympic: No

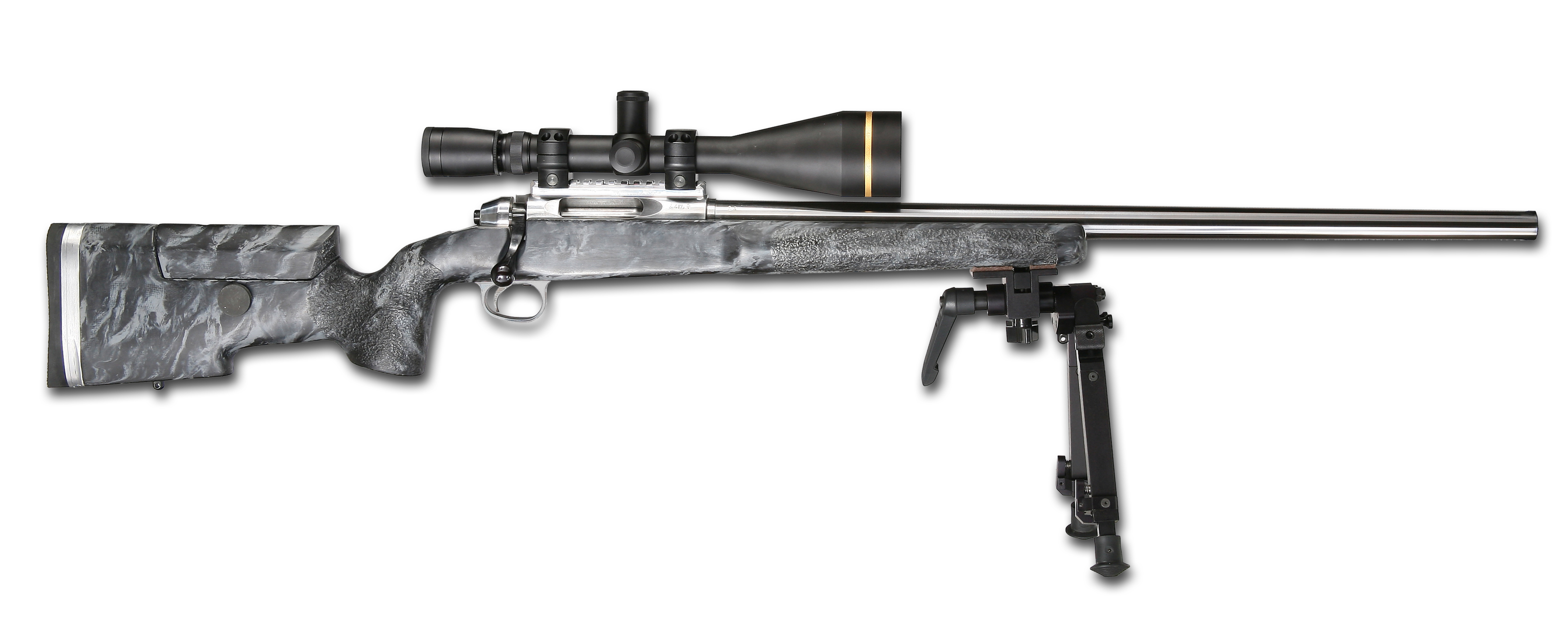
BCM Europearms F Class is a rifle designed for F-Class long range competitions.

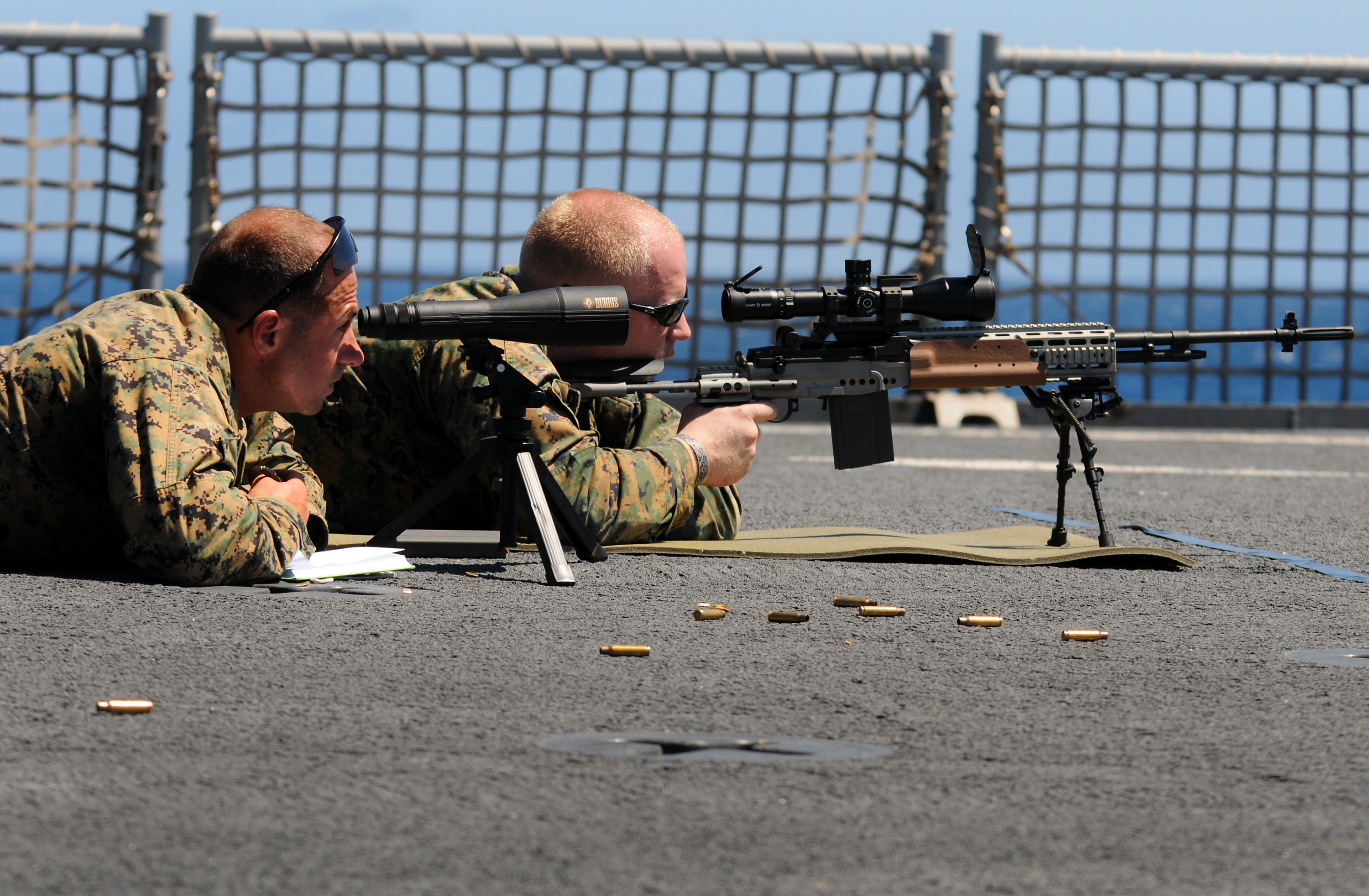
Modern military snipers are often skilled at long range shooting. Behind the shooter lies a spotter, looking for the bullet impact and suggesting adjustments. Teams of spotters and shooters are often used in both civilian and military shooting.

Long range shooting is a collective term for shooting disciplines where the distance to the target is significant enough that the shooter has to put effort into calculating various ballistic factors, especially in regards to the deviating effects of gravity and wind. While shooting at shorter ranges, a shooter only has to slightly adjust the sights to compensate for limited bullet drop at most, but when the range is extended, wind drift will be the first factor affecting precision to the extent that it must be taken into serious account. Some would argue that long range shooting starts where assessment of wind, distance and various atmospheric conditions are equally important for the results as pure shooting skills - meaning that even if one conducts a technically perfect shot, the shooter will miss the target because of incorrect calculations, neglecting to take some elements into consideration, or merely due to unpredictable downrange conditions. It is widely accepted within interdisciplinary circles that for a standard rifle firing full-powered cartridges (e.g. .308 Winchester), "long range" means the target is more than 600 m (660 yd) away,, while "extreme long range" is generally accepted as when the target distance is more than 1,000 m (1,100 yd) away from the shooter.

There are several competitive match circuits that typically consist of targets at long range. Benchrest shooting events are often between 100 and 900 meters (≈ 100 to ≈ 1000 yards), F-Class is typically the same with 300 to 900 meters (≈ 300 to ≈ 1000 yards). A growing form of interdisciplinary shooting, becoming known as Practical Precision, places targets at virtually any distance from 100 to 1800 meters and the scoring is hit/ miss on steel targets of various sizes and from various positions (standing, kneeling, prone). This type of match is quickly becoming more popular than F-Class.

Few complete resources exist for teaching the art of shooting long ranges, but there are some dedicated resources and organizations with education as primary goal.

== Defining "long range" distance classification ==
The distances normally considered to be "long range" is weather- and caliber-dependent, and long range may be defined as stretching the distance at which the firearm and ammunition is capable of making consistent hits. Generally some may claim that for the .22 LR cartridge any distances over 100 metres (110 yd) is considered long range. For centerfire intermediate rifle calibers, some might say that everything over 300 to 400 metres (330 to 440 yd) is considered long range, while some may claim that long range "starts" at 500 metres (550 yd). According to the book Nomad Rifleman's Guide to Extreme Long Range Shooting Fun, mid range is considered 300 to 600 yards, long range is considered 600 yards to 1200 yards, extreme long range (ELR) from 1200 yards to one mile, and extended extreme long range (XELR) beyond 1 mile. It is estimated that fewer people have achieved a 1-mile hit (<4,500) than have summitted Mount Everest.

At the longer ranges the bullets will have a longer flight time, and on days with good lighting and weather conditions one can even see a brief trail of wake behind a supersonic bullet known as a bullet trace, due to turbulences creating visible refractive disturbances in the air. A bullet trace should not be confused with a vapor trail, which is sometimes observed when firing under rare conditions due to changes in air pressure around the bullet. While the bullet trace is usually only observable directly from behind the shooter, a vapor trail from a bullet is observable from any direction. Some believe you really get "the feel" of long range shooting when you have time to see the bullet fly towards the target, and then dive below or swing past, just when you were sure you would hit it. Weather conditions may also affect what is considered long range for a given firearm configuration. For instance a professional shooter may be able to repeatably hit a given size target, i.e. a 100 mm ring, at 1000 meters (0.1 mil target difficulty) in low and predictable wind, while the same 100 mm target may be near impossible to hit in heavy and varying wind at 200 meters (0.5 mil target difficulty).

A spotting scope is often used to observe hits and provide ballistic corrections, and can aid in seeing bullet trace. Bullet trace can often easily be seen in humid weather, but also on cool and sunny days. There are several possible explanations of the phenomenon. The main cause is probably contrails which appear around the bullet due to pressure changes as the bullet travels through the air, thereby causing a short change in the light refraction of the air. In order for the shooter to see their own bullet trace, the bullet trajectory must be within the field of view of their scope sight. In practice this often means the shooter has to dial down the magnification somewhat (i.e. to 10× magnification).

== Calculation of trajectory ==
To succeed at long range shooting, one must have good shooting skill fundamentals, a rifle with good precision and as consistent ammunition as possible (mainly to achieve a consistent muzzle velocity). In addition, a variety of external factors must be taken into account with regard to ballistics calculation, including:

- Wind (both by the shooter and along the whole flight path to the target).
- Bullet shape and weight, trying to achieve the highest possible ballistic coefficient ("BC")
- Air pressure, altitude (Station pressure) and (to a certain degree) humidity
- Temperature (including air, ammunition and barrel temperature)
- Spindrift, an effect caused by the rotation of the bullet
- Coriolis effect, caused by the Earth's rotation
- Mirage, which causes the shooter to hit high and to the side if there is a little wind
- Angle to the target (called "cosine angle"), either up or downhill

etc.

All these parameters can also be used at shorter distances, but the effect they pose is so small that they generally can be disregarded. At short distances the accuracy of the shooter, rifle and ammunition will often mask the very small effect these factors will have.

=== Wind estimation ===
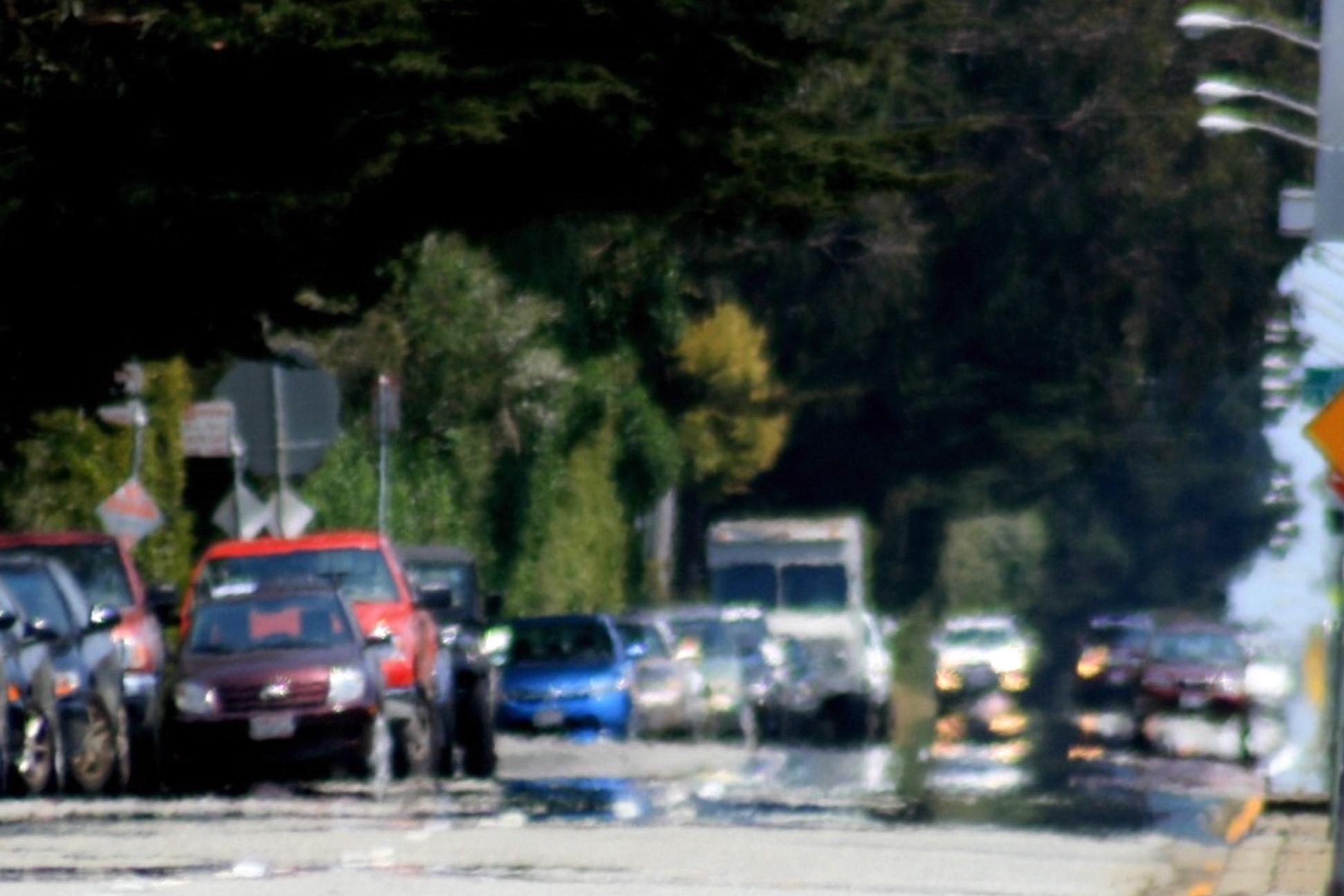
Observing mirage, seen as "waves" above this hot road, is often used to estimate wind speed in long range shooting.

For long range shooting it is important to compensate for the wind by observing the wind's strength and direction, and then adjust the sights accordingly by rules of thumb. Wind force can be estimated by feeling the wind at the shooting position and seeing signs of it in the terrain. For instance, after guessing the wind strength in meters per second (m/s), this wind value can be transferred to a sight correction in number of clicks. This rule of thumb applies to winds that come 90 degree from the side (full value), however winds coming from an angle must be taken into account by applying less sight adjustment.

Long range wind estimation table based on the Beaufort scale

Wind speed (m/s and mph)	Land conditions
Calm <0.3 m/s <1 mph	Smoke rises vertically.
Light Air; 0.3-1.5 m/s 1–3 mph	Direction shown by smoke drift but not by wind vanes.
Light Breeze; 1.6–3.3 m/s 4–7 mph	Wind felt on face; leaves rustle; wind vane moved by wind.
Gentle breeze 3.4–5.5 m/s 8–12 mph	Leaves and small twigs in constant motion; light flags extended.
Moderate breeze 5.5–7.9 m/s 13–18 mph	Raises dust and loose paper; small branches moved.
Fresh breeze 8-10.7 m/s 19–24 mph	Small trees in leaf begin to sway; crested wavelets form on inland waters.
Strong breeze 10.8–13.8 m/s 25–31 mph	Large branches in motion; whistling heard in telegraph wires; umbrellas used with difficulty.

== Competitions ==
There are many different long range disciplines, competing both at known (KD) and unknown distances (UKD), individually or in teams (shooter and spotter). In UKD competitions the marksman must also judge the distances, for example by comparing a known size target with angular mil hashmarks inside their scope (called "milling") to calculate the distance. Sometimes a laser rangefinder may also be used, if permitted.

=== T-Class ===
T-Class shooting, founded in 2014, is a sport mainly focused on competitions with precision rifle systems for various short, medium and long range distances, which may either be known or unknown. Headquarters reside in Bulgaria, and for the purpose of promotion of the sport internationally the organization offers a ruleset which regulates the design and management of competitions.

Competitions consist of several stages, and the competitors have to move between different parts of the stage under a time limitation, quickly assume stable or unstable shooting positions, and use theoretical background to successfully make precise long range shots. The main idea behind T-Class is to create realistic long range shooting competitions which are open to civilian sport shooters, police and military forces. A large emphasis is placed on safe firearm handling. Competitions can be held as either individual or two-person teamwork challenges.

Competitions are divided into six major disciplines:

1. Tactical Sniper. Precision rifle systems (sniper rifles) are used for reproduced but realistic stages with distances from 10 to 1000 meters.
2. Multigun. Each of the stages may combine multiple firearms, such as precision rifles, medium range semi-auto rifles and/or pistols.
3. Extreme Long Range. Precision rifle shooting at distances from 1000 to 1600 meters.
4. Ultra Long Range. Precision rifle shooting at very long distances of 1600 meters or more.
5. Rimfire. Target rifle shooting with .22LR caliber rifles.
6. Support and Backup firearms. Shooting with pistols and medium range semi-auto rifles.

Scoring System

Each target in every exercise is measured in milliradians (mrad) which takes into account its size and distance. There are also no-shoot targets which if struck incur penalties. The mrad system allows the usage of virtually all kinds of shooting targets, like paper, steel or clay targets, golf balls, soda cans, etc. Scoring is made with points attributed to the angular measurements of the target according to pre-defined tables. For some stages of Module 2 and 3, the so-called hit factor is applied (the score on the targets divided by the time used on that stage).

The scoring is calculated by adding results from all the module's stages. The competitor with highest summarized result is awarded with 100 percent. The scoring for the other competitors is made proportionally in relation to the highest summarized score, with calculation up to two decimal places. The calculated sum in percentage from all the three Modules assembles the Match ranking and demonstrates the winner.

=== Precision rifle competition ===
Precision rifle competition is a relatively new long-range competition format which seeks to find a balance between speed and precision, often involving movement and shooting from unusual positions with a time limit, at both known and unknown distances.

Shooting distances can vary from between 10 and 1,000 meters/ yards, and therefore the competitor must know the ballistics of their firearm very well. A competition usually consists of several courses of fire, and requires some physical activity since the shooter has a time limit to move between the various courses of fire. Each course usually has a set maximum time (par time), and the shooter is awarded points according to how many targets he manages to hit during that time. Both cardboard and steel targets are used, and the targets presented are usually relatively small. In the PRS-series for instance, the targets are usually between 0.3-0.9 MIL (3–9 cm at 100 m, approximately 1-3 MOA).

=== F-Class ===
F-Class is a rapidly growing long range shooting discipline internationally governed by the International Confederation of Fullbore Rifle Associations. F-Class carry many similarities to traditional high power rifle, except that it is only fired at distances between 300 and 1200 yards (or meters), and the targets are half the size of regular targets. They compete in two categories:

- F-Open (Open Class): All rifle calibers up to 8.89 mm (0.35 in) may be used, along with a scope, and one can choose between using front rest and rear bag, or a bipod/ backpack. The weight limit including optics is 10 kg (22 lb).
- F-TR ("Target", Standard Class): A restricted class permitting a scope, bipod/ backpack and rear bag (no front rest), but the rifle has to be of either caliber .223 Remington or .308 Winchester. In addition, the weight limit including optics is 8.25 kg (18.2 lb).

== Sight magnification ==
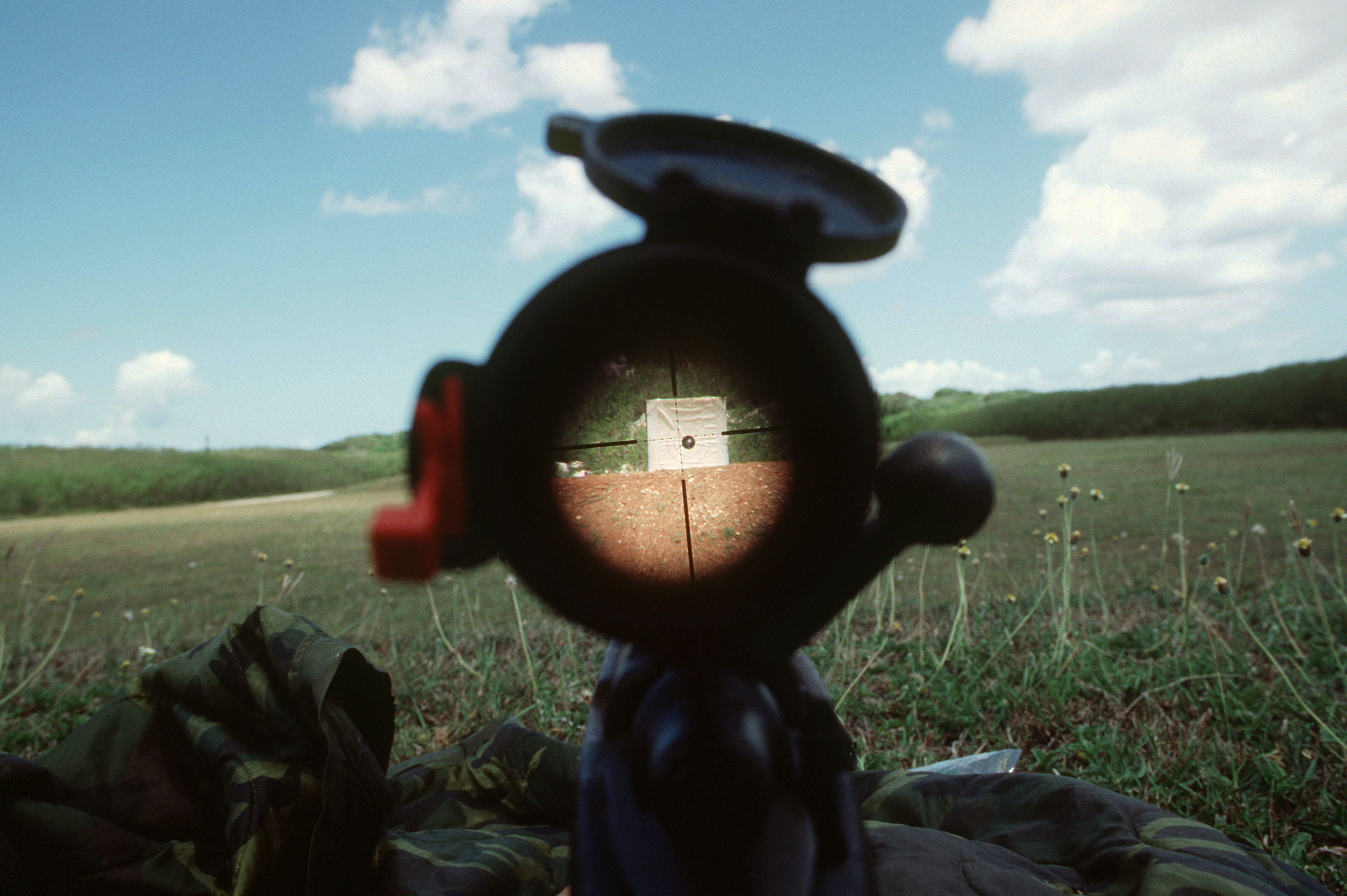
View through a 20x power scope sight with mil-dots at 300 yards (274 meters).

The ideal scope sight magnification for different types of long range shooting depends on application, scope quality and user preference. Different applications may have different shooting distances, light conditions, target sizes and target contrast against the background. Ideally scope magnification should be high enough while still being comfortable and safe to use.

Pros of high scope magnification are:

- Easier to see the target at distance.
- Easier to spot whether the round was a hit or miss, and easier to estimate sight corrections.

Cons of high scope magnification are:

- The sight picture appears to shake easier by movement of the shooter.
- Mirage becomes more visible.
- Less field of view makes it more difficult to initially find the target, and to see the surroundings of the target.
- Less light transmission gives a darker image in the scope when compared to a scope with larger tube and objective diameter or inside the same scope at a lower magnification.
- Smaller exit pupil diameter makes it more difficult to get in the correct position behind the scope.

Mirage is a light distortion caused by temperature differences between the air and ground making it difficult to get a clear sight picture of the target. Mirage becomes more apparent the higher the magnification, but at what magnification mirage starts to become an issue depends on weather conditions.

== See also ==
- Benchrest shooting
- External ballistics
- Longest recorded sniper kills
