= International Confederation of Fullbore Rifle Associations =

Governing body for shooting sports

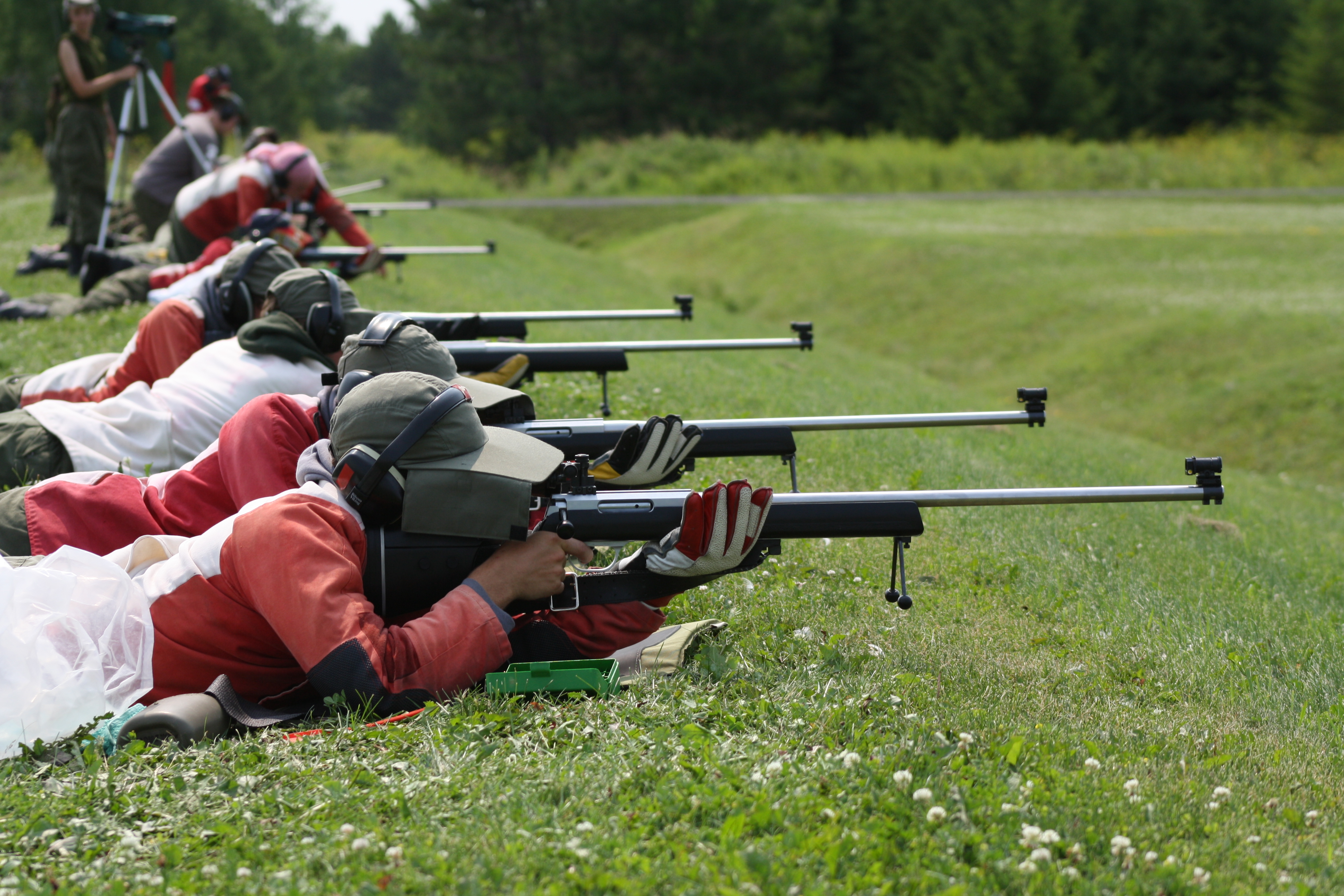
- Sport: Fullbore rifle
- Jurisdiction: International
- Membership: 12 full members, 28 affiliated members, 8 observer members
- Abbreviation: ICFRA
- Founded: July 2003

Official website
- icfra.com

The International Confederation of Fullbore Rifle Associations (ICFRA) is the international association for the fullbore rifle shooting sports of target rifle ('TR') (called 'Palma' rifle in the US) and F-Class, which are long range competitions shot at distances between 300 and 900 meters or 300 to 1,000 yards depending on the range. F-Class shooters often shoot concurrently with the world's long-range TR shooters and use the same targets, except that the F-Class target has an extra ring half the diameter of the smallest in use for TR. ICFRA manages the programme of World Championships and other major matches for Fullbore Rifle and seeks to standardize the competition rules for TR and F-Class around the world.

World Long-Range Rifle Team and Individual Championships for both TR and F-Class are hosted every four years alternately two years apart. The winner of the World Long Range TR Team Championship is awarded the Palma trophy.

== History ==
=== Formation of ICFRA ===
Starting at the 1999 Palma and Individual Long Range World Championship in South Africa, representatives of 14 countries met and a formed a steering committee to form the foundation of an international organization to become the successor of the Palma Council. ICFRA was formally founded in July 2003, and the management of its world championship events in the Palma match and other target rifle events is vested in its World Championship Committee as the successor to the Palma Council; and management of F-Class World Championships is vested in it F-Class Committee. The Palma match shot in 2003 was the first to have the formal status of world team championship.

=== Palma match competitions ===
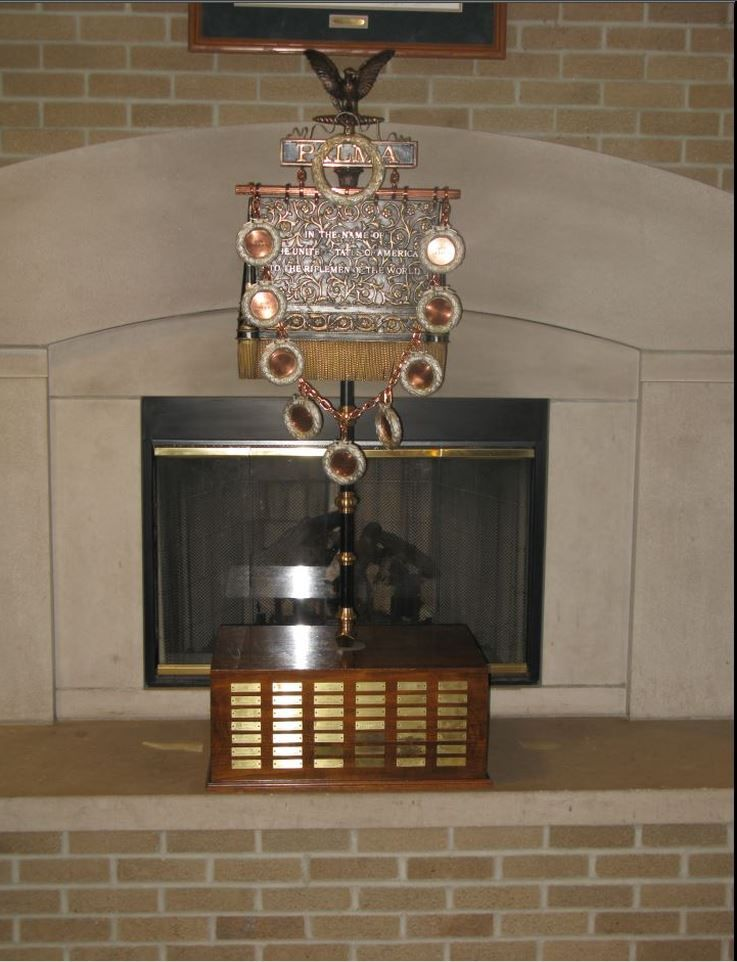
The Palma Trophy

The Palma competition dates from 1876, featuring long-range rifle shooting out to 1,000 yards. The first Palma match was contested by teams from the U.S., Australia, Canada, Scotland and Ireland (with muzzle-loading rifles at that time). The Palma match is the world's second-oldest International Team Match, behind only the America's Cup. The matches continued to the late 1920s, and the trophy was eventually lost in Washington DC around the outbreak of WW2. The match was revived in the modern era in 1966 in Canada, and continues between teams from around the world. The bolt-action rifles are to ICFRA TR specification (either .308 Winchester or .223 Remington are allowed) and fire Match Grade ammunition using a 155 or 90 grain bullet respectively using micrometer aperture (iron) sights. The last two of its international long-range target rifle world championships were held in the U.S. in 2015 (won by Great Britain) and in New Zealand in 2019 (won by Australia). Its modern Palma matches require teams of 16 firers (occupying 4 targets), together with 4 target wind coaches, a captain, manager, and main wind coach, plus 2 reserves. Thus, a full strength Palma 'squad' is 25 persons.

=== F-Class ===
F-Class was started in Canada by the late George "Farky" Farquharson after whom the class is named. He is in the DCRA Hall of Fame in the Builder category for those members who have made a truly lasting impact on the Association. In the United States, J.J. Conway is considered the "grandfather of F-Class" in the United States.

== Equipment classes ==
=== Target (Palma) rifle ===
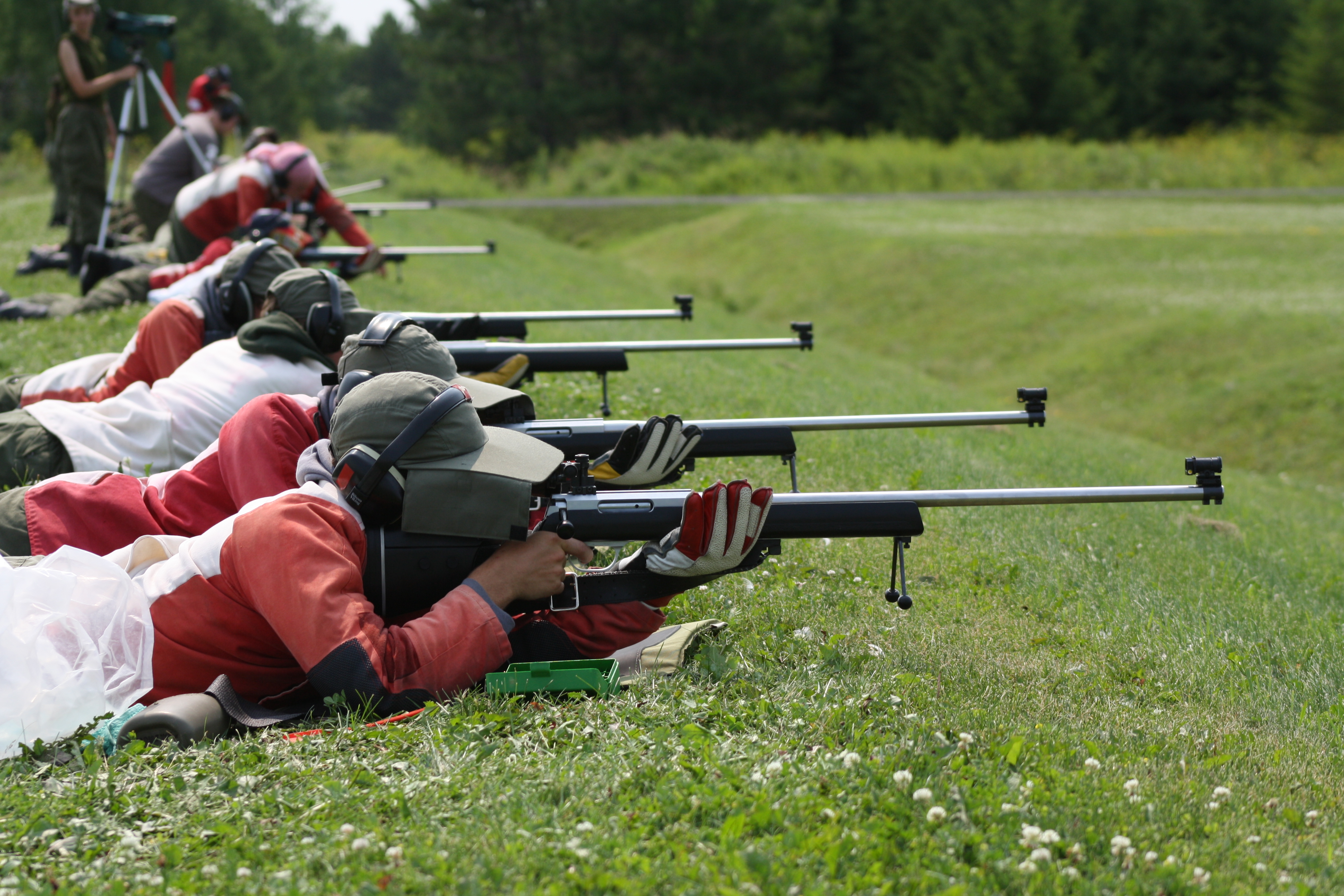
In Palma-style competitions only iron-sighted rifles are permitted; however, competitors may use slings and special clothing to increase stability.

Target rifle is a fullbore rifle discipline shot with iron-sighted rifles at ranges from 300 to 1000 yards or metric equivalents. Shooting is conducted prone with the rifle supported with an adjustable sling comprising a cuff for the upper arm and an adjustable strap connected to the rifle's forend. Special shooting jackets are permitted, which can increase the stability of the shooter, reduce movement of the firearm due to pulse, help with consistent recoil management and provide padding for the elbows against the ground. Because of the tension of the sling and the weight of the rifle, it is common to use a padded shooting glove in the support hand for comfort. No bipods or rests are permitted. Minimum trigger pull weight is 500 grams (approximately 1.1 lbs). The total weight of the rifle is unlimited. The rifle must be chambered for either the unmodified .308 Winchester/ 7.62×51mm or .223 Remington/ 5.56×45mm cartridge cases. Bullet weight for .308 Win must be less than 156 grains (10 grams) (typically 155 grain bullets are used), and less than 91 grains (5.8 grams) for .223 Rem (typically 80 or 90 grain bullets are used). The type of rear sights used in TR shooting are dubbed "iron sights" or "aperture sights". to distinguish them from telescopic sights or "Riflescopes". The sights move in the vertical and horizontal planes in fixed increments of (typically) 1/4 minutes of angle (MOA); as a rule of thumb, moving the sight by 1 MOA moves the impact of the shots by 1 inch (25 mm) per hundred yards distance of the target from the rifle. Sights with finer increments (1/8 MOA) or coarser (1/2 MOA) are to be found, but are less commonly seen on iron-sighted full bore target rifles. Shooters may use a foresight lens of no greater magnification of +0.5 dioptre (Focal Length 2M) and a single corrective lens or variable dioptre not exceeding 1.5x magnification in the rearsight. The US Palma rifle differs little from the target rifle specification except in so far as the trigger pull does not have a minimum weight and the chamber specification is 7.62×51mm NATO and 5.56×45mm NATO. US competitions designated 'Palma' often allow bullets heavier than 155 grain; the world championship Palma match does not. In addition, US competitions often have a section for service rifles of the appropriate calibre and sighting.

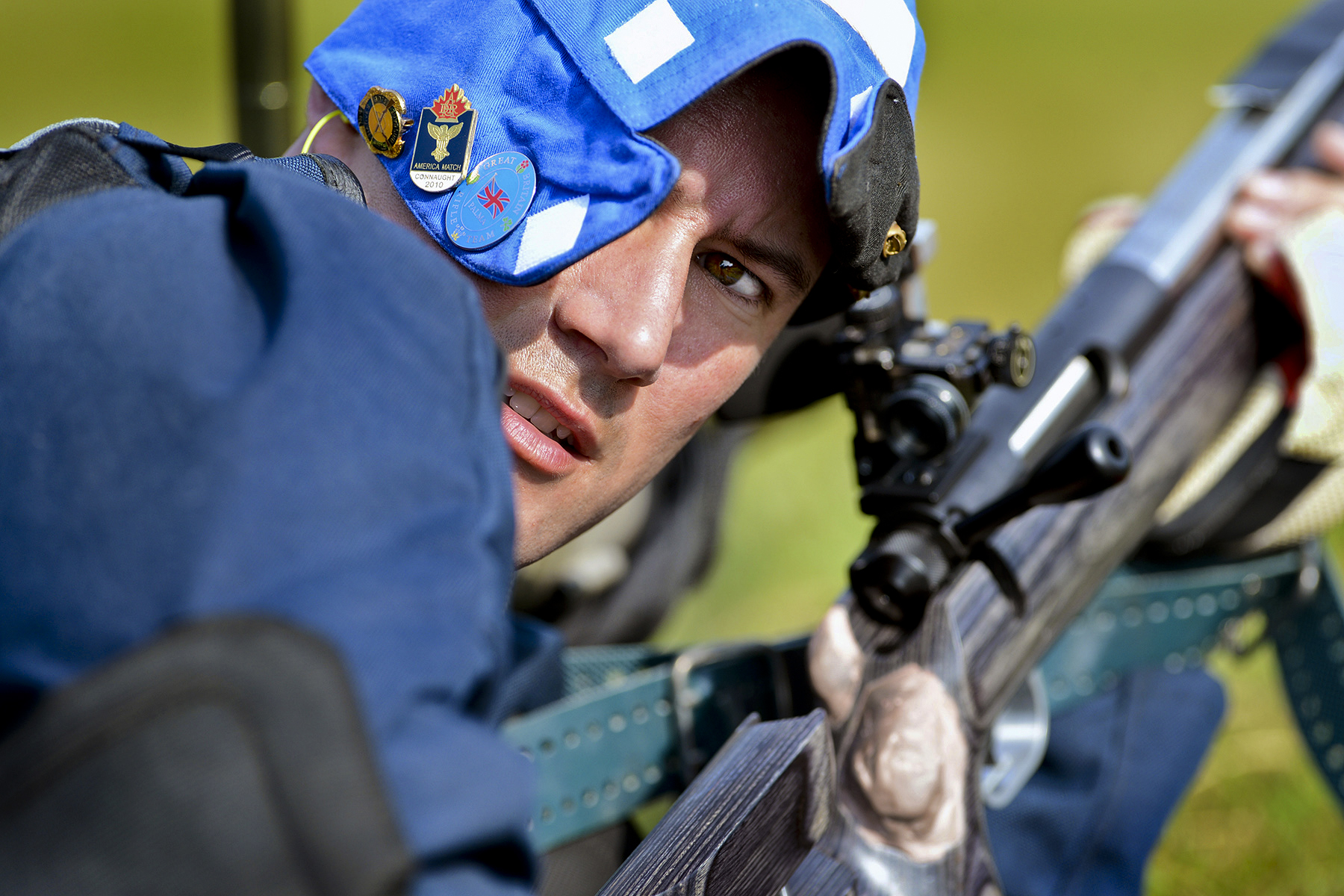
A U.S. marksman at the 2014 Inter-service Rifle Competition at Marine Corps Base Quantico, Virginia.

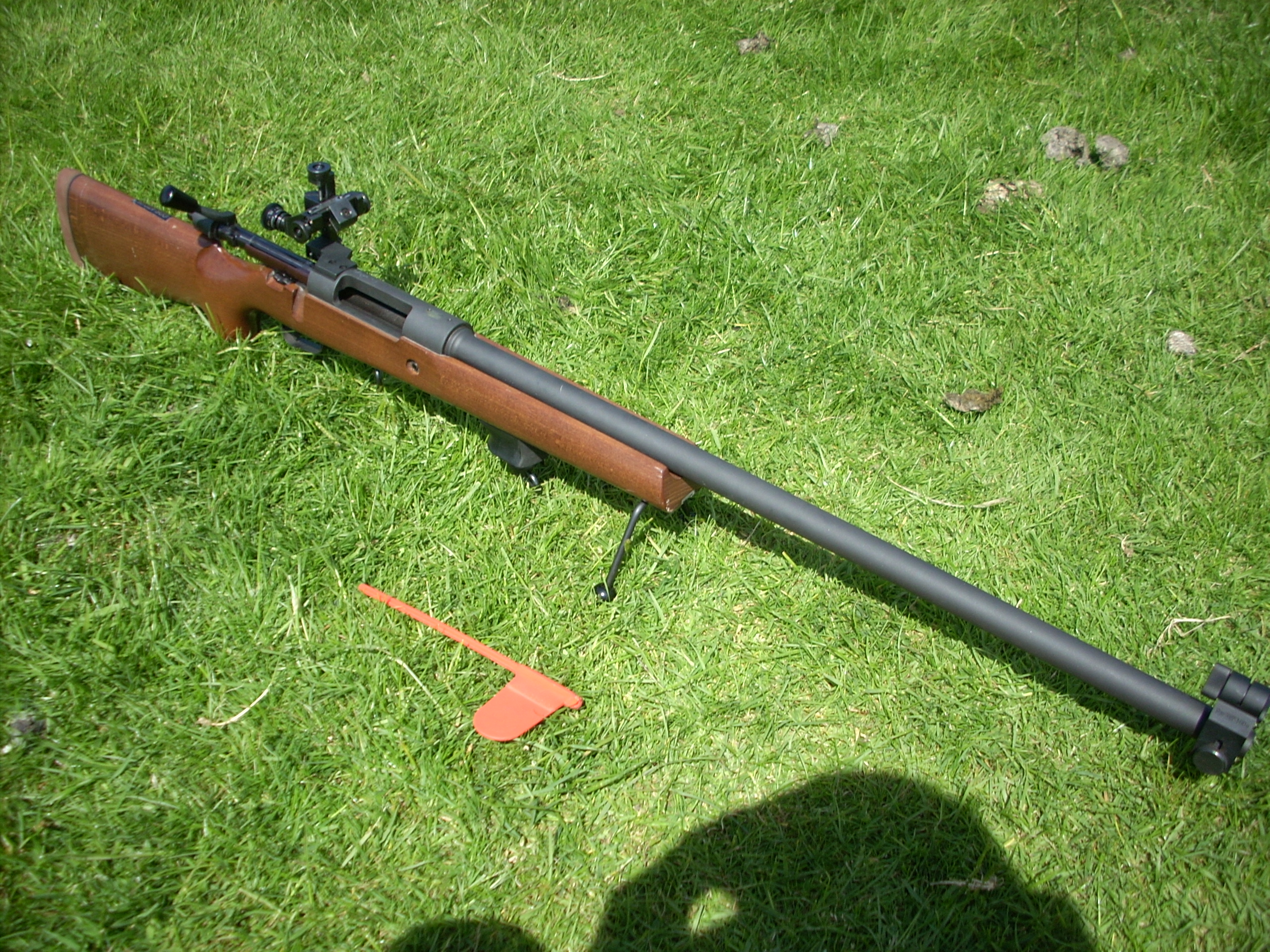
An L81 A2 cadet target rifle.

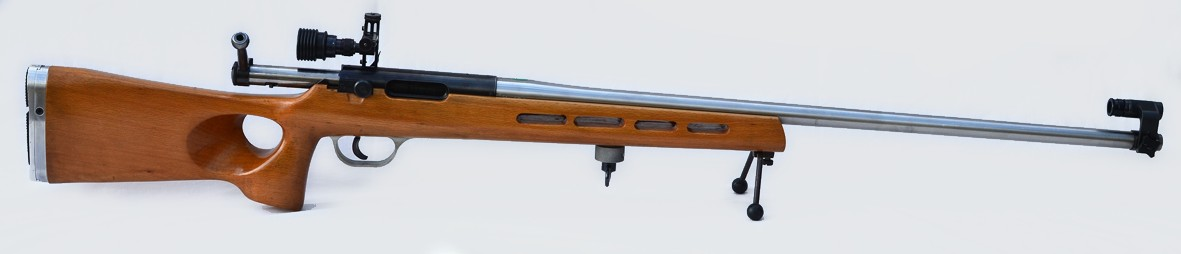
Swing Mk4 – a typical wooden-stocked target rifle

=== F-Class ===
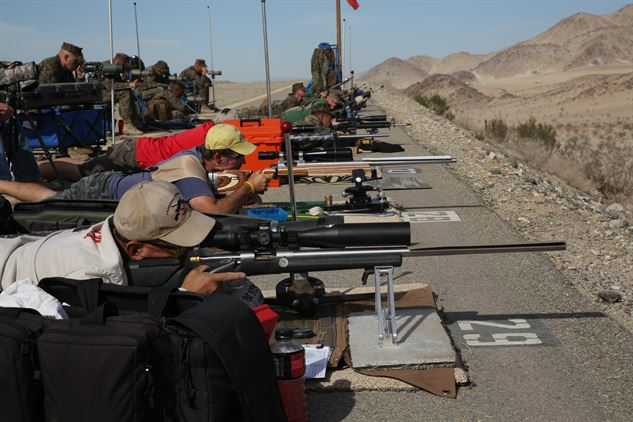
In F-Class, telescopic sights, rear bags, and either a bipod or front rest is permitted. The nearest shooter has a bipod, the next one a pedestal rest

F-Class is a rapidly growing variant of fullbore target rifle competition which permits optical telescopic sights and shooting rests such as a pedestal rest or a bipod at the front of the rifle and a tightly packed sandbag at the rear of the rifle. Competitions are fired at distances from 300 to 1000 yards and, recognising the inherent increase in accuracy of supported rifles, the center of the target has an extra scoring ring which is half the size of the smallest one used in traditional target rifle shooting and each ring scores one point less than it does for target rifle. Competitors can choose to compete in one of the two classes F(Open) or F/TR:

- F-Open (Open Class): All rifle calibres up to 8 mm (0.31 in) may be used, along with a scope, and one can choose between using front rest and rear bag, or a bipod/ backpack, also with a rear bag. The weight limit including optics is 10 kg (22 lb).
- F/TR ("F-target rifle"), : A restricted class permitting a scope, bipod/ backpack and rear bag (no front rest), but the rifle has to be of either calibre .223 Remington or .308 Winchester and the bullet may be of any weight. In addition, the weight limit (including optics) for the rifle is 8.25 kg (18.2 lb). The designation '-target rifle' reflects the original intention that it would appeal to elderly or less physically able TR shooters who wished to remain in the sport while using their original equipment.
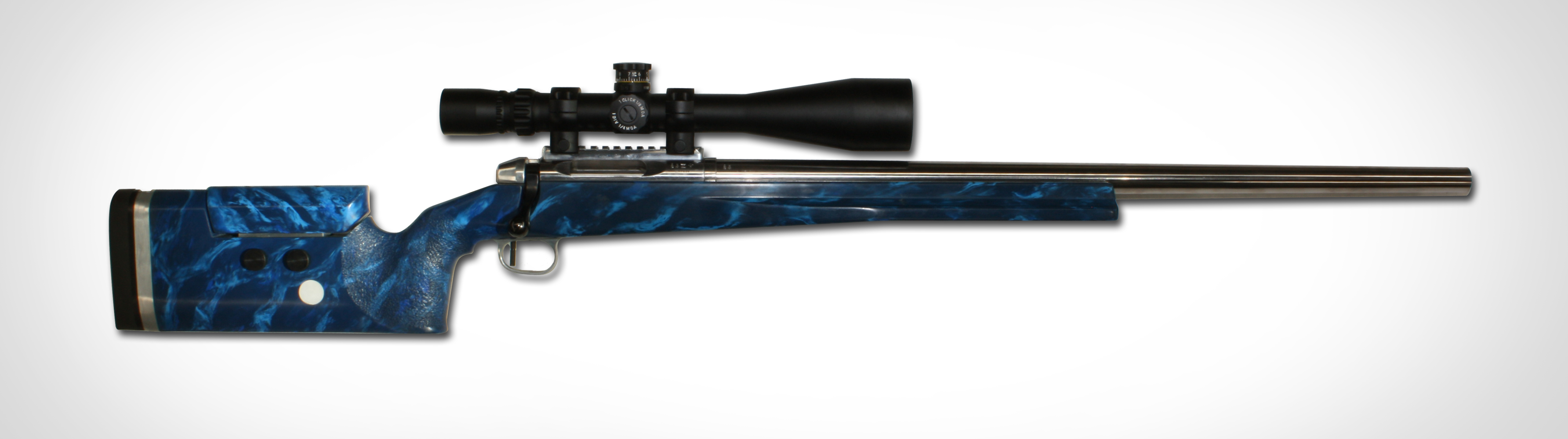
A BCM Europearms rifle intended for use with front rest and rear bag in the F-Class Open.

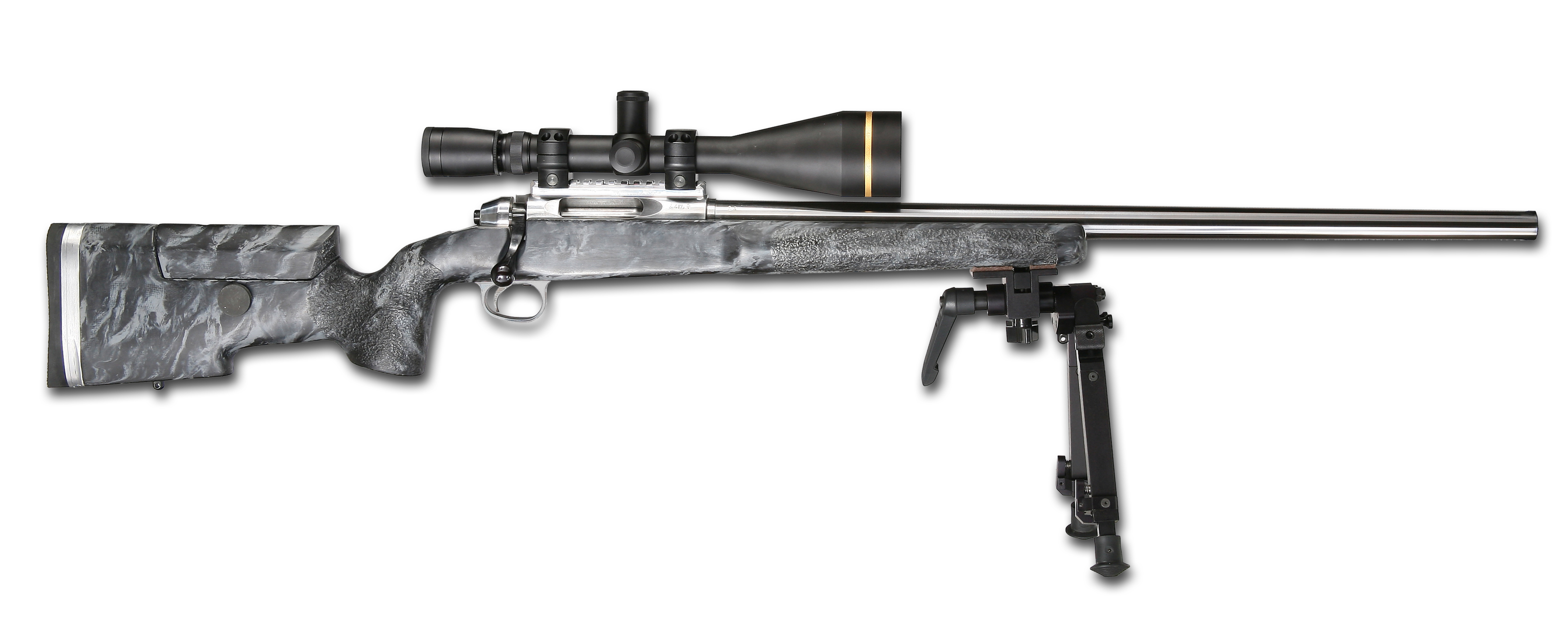
Another BCM Europearms rifle intended F-Class Open, this one with a bipod instead of a front rest.

=== Ammunition ===
The reason for limiting bullet weights in the fullbore discipline of target rifle is to level the playing field and make the competition about physical and wind reading skills instead of about equipment. Lighter bullets usually have a lower ballistic coefficient and are therefore more susceptible to wind drift. .308 Winchester/ 7.62×51mm is limited to a maximum bullet weight of 156 grains (ca. 10 grams), which can be seen as a little bit on the light side for the .308 calibre in long range shooting. .223 Rem/ 5.56×45mm is limited to a maximum bullet weight of 91 grains (ca 5.8 grams), which can be seen as a little on the heavy side for the calibre, thus increasing the long range potential of the otherwise "inferior" .223 calibre compared to the .308. Surprisingly, the little .223 does just a well as a .308, but it is difficult to find a load and a rifle that will shoot competitively, because of the precision there needs to be.

The F-Class Open has no limitations on bullet weight, as long as the calibre is 8mm or less. Note that some ICFRA member associations may have additional national competition classes with other calibre and equipment restrictions; notably a maximum calibre of .35" (8.89mm) in the US.

=== Other equipment and accessories ===
All competitors are allowed to use a spotting scope while shooting. The most important use of the spotting scope is reading the wind by watching mirage downrange, which is easier with higher magnification. Scopes with powers between 30 and 50× and a lens diameter of 50 mm or larger are commonly used. When shooting at paper targets, another common use of the spotting scope is to spot for the scoring disks which are placed onto the targets by range personnel to indicate the score of the shot just fired and its location. The use of scoring disks is not necessary when using electronic targets.

All competitors may use a shooting mat for padding and insulation against the ground.

== Match format ==
The Palma match course of fire consists of three yardages – 800, 900 and 1000 yards or Metric alternatives – with two sighting shots and fifteen shots to count at each. This format is reflected in the courses of fire for the actual Palma match, the TR Individual Long Range World Championship and the 4 F-Class World Championships (F(O) and F/TR, Individual and Team). In the Team Matches the course is fired twice over two successive days: for the Individual TR Championship three times plus a 'final' – an additional 15 shots at 1000 yards for the top 10 scorers to date. F-Class Individual comprises two Palma Courses followed by two shoots of 20 shots at 1000 yards. Domestic Palma championships may consist of two or three Palma courses. Another course of fire commonly used has yardages at 600 yards and 1000 yards, with 15- or 20-shot strings at each distance.

Most ICFRA Members also provide National Championships and lesser events comprising both long range and short range shoots. The pre-eminent competition is HM the King's Prize shot annually at Bisley in the UK, with versions being shot in many Commonwealth Countries. For this, following a qualifying shoot, competitors shoot 10 shots at each of 300, 500 and 600 yards, followed by 15 at 900 and 1000 yards for the top 100 scorers after the short ranges. Fullbore target rifle also features in the Commonwealth Games shooting events with both individual and pairs events using the Kings Prize format.

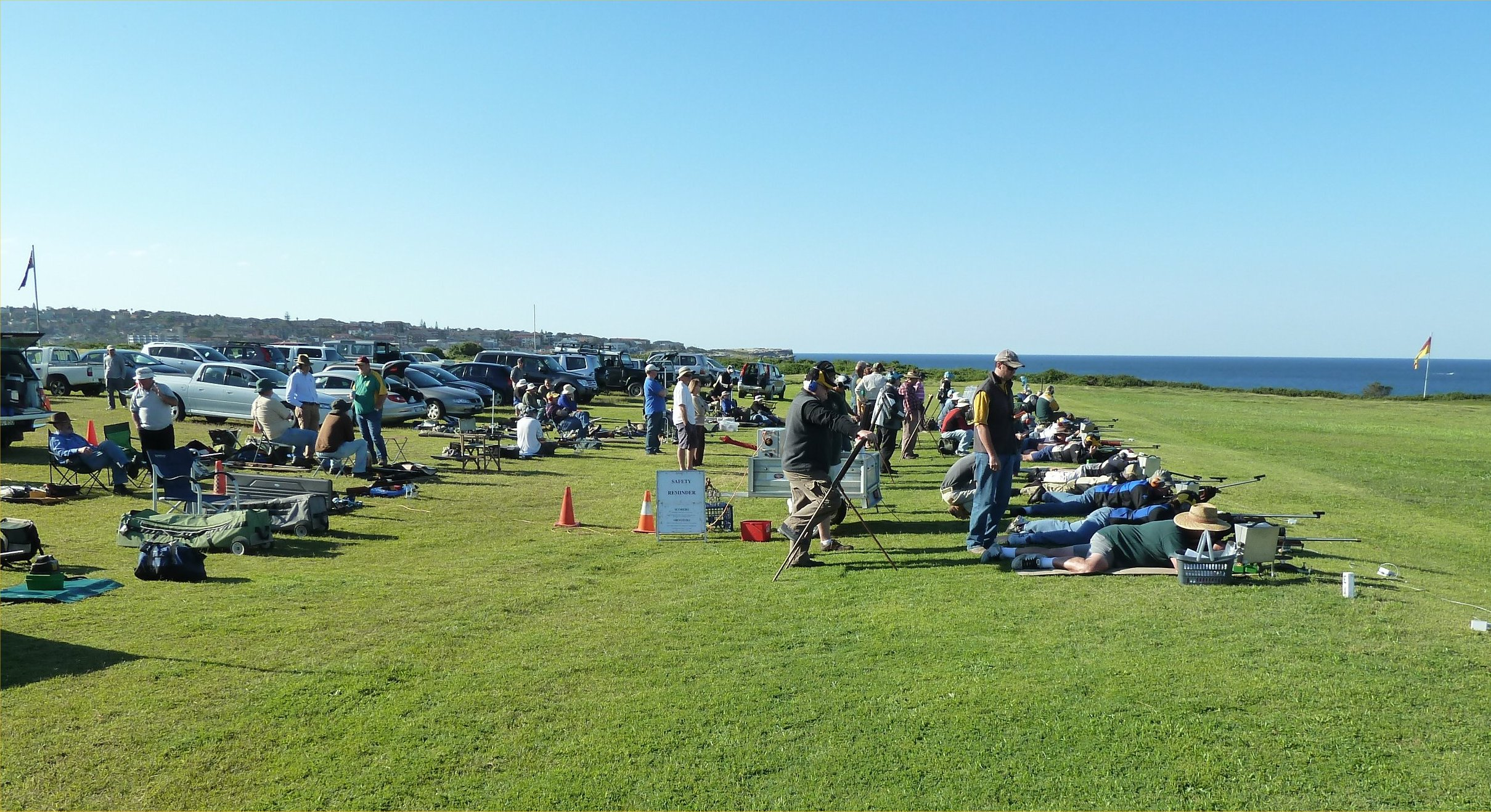
Firing line at a Fullbore Rifle match in 2013 in Malabar Headland, New South Wales, Australia.

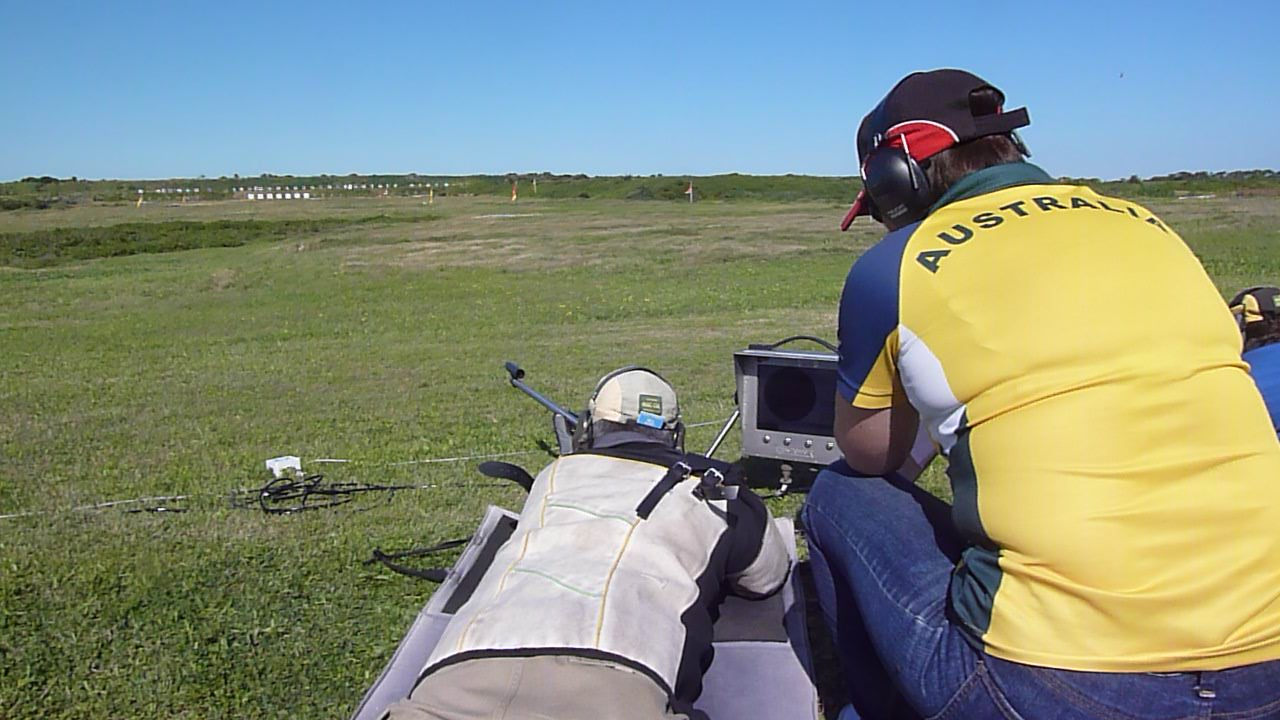
Close view of one a shooter with a monitor besides him for electronic scoring.

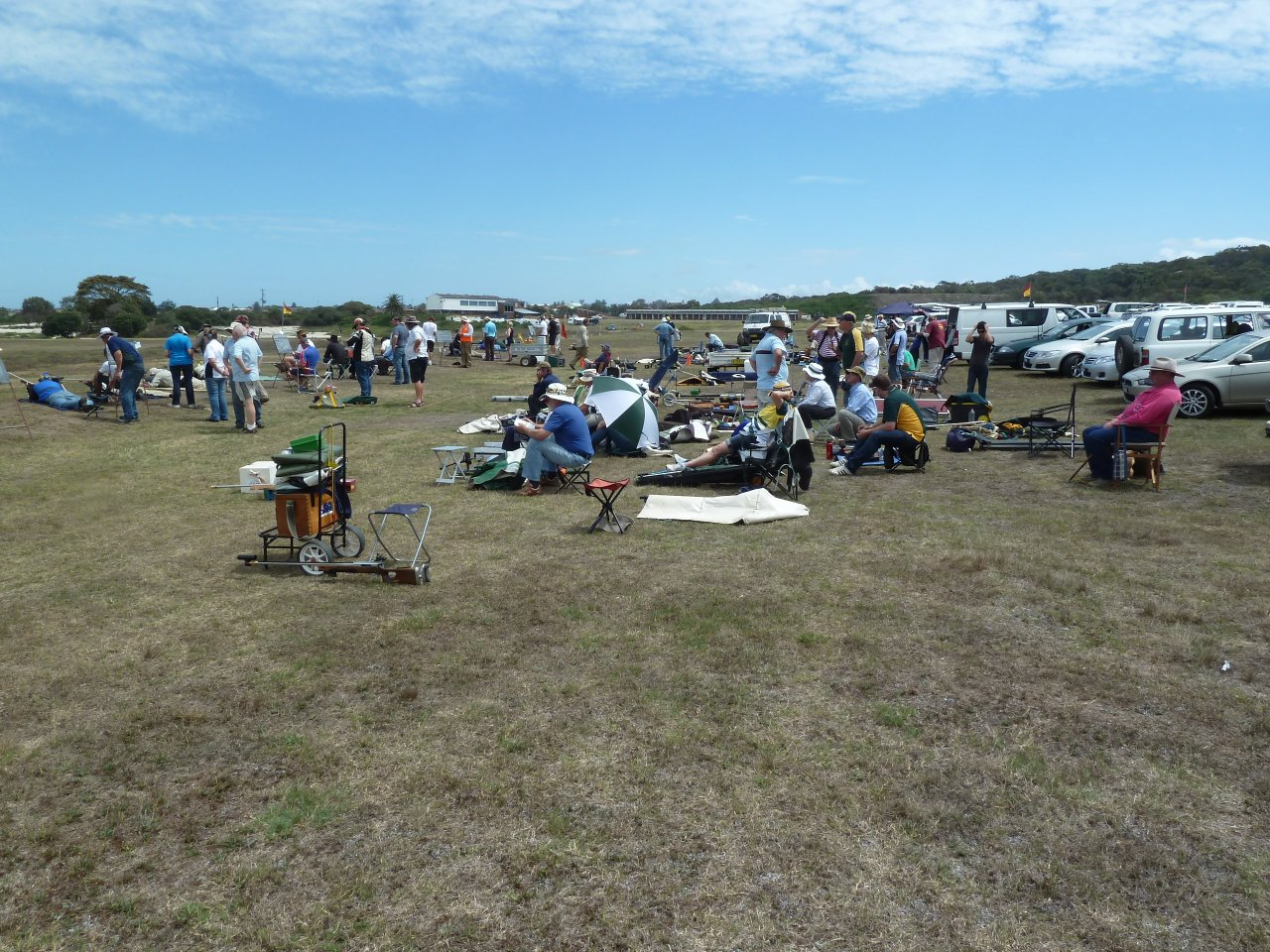
Spectators and competitors relax between the shooting.

=== Distances and targets ===
ICFRA competitions can be held in either a short range or long range format (or, typically, both), with distances either in the imperial yards or the metric meters. F-Class shoots at the same targets as target rifle, but with the extra ring as described above. The scoring is based on points, with the object to place shots as close to the center or "Bull" as possible. While short range is shot at a different target size for each of the distances, long range is shot at the one and same target for all three distances (800, 900 & 1000 yards). The 'bullseye' is the second smallest ring on the relevant target: the smallest ring is used for breaking tied scores and is designated the 'Vee-Bull' (in the US the 'X'): for the two or more equal bullseye-based scores that with the highest number of Vee-bulls is superior. The ICFRA bullseye counts 5 points, the US Palma bullseye 10 points making the maximum scores for 10 shots 50 (10-Vee) (ICFRA) or 100 (10-X) in the US. Thus, 50 with 6 Vees ("50.6") is superior to 49 with 8 Vees ("49.8").

The imperial short range distances are:

- 300 yd (274.32 m)
- 500 yd (457.2 m)
- 600 yd (548.64 m).

The metric short range distances are:

- 300 m
- 500 m
- 600 m.

Long range is shot between 700 m to 1000 yds (914.4 m).

	(image missing)
Long Range Target 700 m-1000 yd
Aiming Mark	1120 mm
Extra inner ring (F-Class only)	128 mm
V-Bull	255 mm
Bull	510 mm
Inner	815 mm
Magpie	1120 mm
Outer	1830 mm

== World championship results ==
The World Long-Range Rifle Team Championships is hosted every four years, where the winning team is awarded the Palma trophy. Prior to 2003 and the foundation of ICFRA, the Palma match did not confer the title of "world champions" to the winners, but ICFRA has recognised the Individual World Champions since 1992 inclusive. Below is list of previous Palma winners: the full lists of World Champions Team and Individual for TR and F-Class is to be found on the ICFRA Website. In addition there are World Championship Team Matches for Veterans (60 and over), 21-25 Age Group and Under-21. These are multi-range Matches not shot over the Palma course of fire.

=== Palma match (team event) ===
Overall

Year	Gold	Silver	Bronze	Venue
1876	United States	Ireland	Scotland	Creedmoor, US
1877	United States	Great Britain	-	Creedmoor, US
1901	Canada	United States	-	Sea Girt, US
1902	Great Britain	United States	Canada	Rockliffe, Canada
1903	United States	Great Britain	Canada	Bisley, UK
1907	United States	Canada	Australia	Rockliffe, Canada
1912	United States	Canada	-	Rockliffe, Canada
1913	United States	Argentina	Canada	Camp Perry, US
1928	United States	Cuba	-	Camp Perry, US
1966	United States	Canada	-	Camp Perry, US
1967	Canada	Great Britain	United States	Connaught, Canada
1968	United States	Canada	-	Camp Perry, US
1969	United States	Great Britain	Canada	Connaught, Canada
1970	Great Britain	United States	Canada	Bisley, UK
1971	United States	Great Britain	Canada	Camp Perry, US
1972	Canada	United States	-	Connaught, Canada
1973	United States	Canada	-	Camp Perry, US
1974	South Africa	United States	Rhodesia	Bloemfontein, South Africa
1976	United States	South Africa	Great Britain	Camp Perry, US
1979	Australia	New Zealand	United States	Trentham, New Zealand
1982	Canada	Australia	New Zealand	Connaught, Canada
1985	United States	Great Britain	Australia	Bisley, UK
1988	Australia	Great Britain	New Zealand	Sydney, Australia
1992	Great Britain	Canada	New Zealand	Raton, New Mexico
1995	Great Britain	United States	New Zealand	Trentham, New Zealand
1999	South Africa	Great Britain	New Zealand	Bloemfontein, South Africa
2003	Great Britain	United States	South Africa	Bisley, UK
2007	Great Britain	South Africa	Australia	Ottawa, Canada
2011	Great Britain	South Africa	United States	Brisbane, Australia
2015	Great Britain	United States	South Africa	Camp Perry, US
2019	Australia	Great Britain	United States	Seddon Range, New Zealand
2024	Australia	Great Britain	South Africa	Bloemfontain, South Africa
2028				Bisley, UK

=== Individual Long Range World Championships ===
The following categories are awarded:

- Overall
- Veterans (over 60 years)
- Age 21–25 years
- Age under 21 years

in addition there are special prizes for:-

- Super Veteran (over 70 years)
- Highest Female shooter: Fullbore Rifle is gender-blind, recognising that female shooters can, and frequently do, outscore their male colleagues. See 2003 Overall Individual below for example.

Overall

Year	Gold	Silver	Bronze	Venue
1992	(United Kingdom) TA Ringer	(United Kingdom) A St G Tucker	(United Kingdom) D Coleman	Raton, New Mexico, United States
1995	(United Kingdom) TA Ringer	(Northern Ireland) DC Calvert	(United States) E Pintard	Trentham, New Zealand
1999	(Zimbabwe) DV Enslin	(Australia) SR Dunstall	(United States) Ms N Zinmaster	Bloemfontein, South Africa
2003	(United States) (Miss) SJ Gallacher	(United Kingdom) J Pugsley	(United Kingdom) Lt N Ball	Bisley, Great Britain
2007	(United Kingdom) DC Luckman	(New Zealand) M Collings	(United States) (Mrs) N Zinmaster-Mayo	Connaught, Canada
2011	(United Kingdom) R Jeens	(South Africa) A du Toit	(United Kingdom) DC Luckman	Brisbane, Australia
2015	(Australia) B Emms	(United Kingdom) N Ball	(Australia) M Pozzebon	Camp Perry, Ohio, United States
2019	(Australia) S Negus	(Australia) M Bailey	(United Kingdom) DC Luckman	Trentham, New Zealand
2024	(Australia) A Bidgood	(United Kingdom) G Barnett	(United Kingdom) JC Underwood	Bloemfontein, South Africa
2028				Bisley, Great Britain

Veteran

Year	Gold	Silver	Bronze	Venue
2003	(South Africa) EE Stigant			Bisley, Great Britain
2007	(United States) TJ Whitaker			Connaught, Canada
2011	(United States) TJ Whitaker			Brisbane, Australia
2015	(United States) David Tubb			Camp Perry, Ohio, United States
2019	(Australia) MI Buchanan			Trentham, New Zealand
2024	(Australia) J Bailey			Bloemfontein, South Africa
2028				Bisley, Great Britain

Under 25 year

Year	Gold	Silver	Bronze	Venue
2003	(United Kingdom) R Stewart			National Shooting Centre, Bisley, Great Britain
2007	(United Kingdom) P Seebohm			Connaught, Canada
2011	(South Africa) A du Toit			Brisbane, Australia
2015	(United Kingdom) Jack Alexander			Camp Perry, Ohio, United States
2019	(Australia) C Schwebel			Trentham, New Zealand
2024	(Australia) M Bailey			Bloemfontein, South Africa

Under 21 years

Year	Gold	Silver	Bronze	Venue
2003	(Jersey) PRD Stock			National Shooting Centre, Bisley, Great Britain
2007	(Jersey) DA Richardson			Connaught, Canada
2011	No championship held			
2015	(United States) Waylon Burbach			Camp Perry, Ohio, United States
2019	(United States) L Rettmer			Trentham, New Zealand
2024	(South Africa) NC Bennett			Bloemfontein, South Africa

=== Individual F-Class ===
World Championships

Year	Class	Gold	Silver	Bronze	Venue
2002		(Germany) W Scholze	(United States) L Bartholome	(United States) R Crone	Connaught, Canada
2005		(United States) MW Tompkins	(United States) L Bartholome	(United States) S Ahrens	Bloemfontein, South Africa
2009	Open	(United Kingdom) G Costello	(United Kingdom) D Parr	(Scotland) G Taylor	National Shooting Centre, Bisley, Great Britain
2009	F-TR	(United Kingdom) R Simmonds	(United Kingdom) G Barnard	(United States) S Pate	National Shooting Centre, Bisley, Great Britain
2013	Open	(United States) K Adams	(Australia) M Lobert	(United States) B Mead	NRA Whittington Center, Raton, New Mexico, United States
2013	F-TR	(United States) N Taylor	(United Kingdom) R Simmonds	(United States) D Buell	NRA Whittington Center, Raton, New Mexico, United States
2017	Open	(Australia) R Davies	(United Kingdom) P Sandie	(Australia) A Pohl	Connaught, Canada
2017	F-TR	(United States) D Rodgers	(Canada) K Chou	(United States) B Litz	Connaught, Canada
2023	Open	(South Africa) B Engelbrecht	(South Africa) J Louw	(Australia) R Davies	Bloemfontein, South Africa
2023	F-TR	(South Africa) H Rolfes	(South Africa) J Cilliers	(South Africa) D Labuschagne	Bloemfontein, South Africa
2026	Open	(United States) B Zwahr	(United States) M Basalla	(United States) E Kovan	National Shooting Centre, Bisley, Great Britain
2026	F-TR	(Pakistan) J Ali	(United States) B Sauve	(Canada) R Heck	National Shooting Centre, Bisley, Great Britain
2030	Open				Brisbane, Australia
2030	F-TR				Brisbane, Australia

U25 - World Championships

Year	Class	Gold	Silver	Bronze	Venue
2017	Open - U25	(Canada) R Ireland	(United Kingdom) J West	(United States) M Bramley	Connaught, Canada
2017	FTR - U25	(United States) M Fitzpatrick	(United States) S McSparron	(United States) C McSparron	Connaught, Canada
2023	Open - U25	(United Kingdom) T Reynolds	(Australia) M Lowe	Not Awarded	Bloemfontein, South Africa
2023	F-TR - U25	(United Kingdom) G Campbell	Not Awarded	Not Awarded	Bloemfontein, South Africa
2026	Open - U25	(Australia) J Foster	(United States) J Massingill	(United States) S Plue	National Shooting Centre, Bisley, Great Britain
2026	F-TR - U25	(Canada) M Zhi Han	(Croatia) A Nikolic	(Pakistan) H Gill	National Shooting Centre, Bisley, Great Britain
2030	Open - U25				Brisbane, Australia
2030	F-TR - U25				Brisbane, Australia

=== Teams F-Class ===
F Open World Championships - Farquharson Cup

Year	Gold	Silver	Bronze	Venue
2009	Great Britain	United States	South Africa	Bisley, Great Britain
2013	Australia	United States	South Africa	Raton, New Mexico, USA
2017	Australia	Canada	United States	Connaught, Ottawa, Canada
2023	United States	South Africa	Australia	General de Wet, Bloemfontein, South Africa
2026	South Africa	United States	Australia	Bisley, Great Britain

F-TR World Championships - Richardson Cup

Year	Gold	Silver	Bronze	Venue
2009	United States	Great Britain	Ireland	Bisley, Great Britain
2013	United States	Canada	Great Britain	Raton, New Mexico, USA
2017	United States	Australia	South Africa	Connaught, Ottawa, Canada
2023	South Africa	United States	Great Britain	General de Wet, Bloemfontein, South Africa
2026	Great Britain	Pakistan	United States	Bisley, Great Britain

== See also ==
- Sovereign's Prize, an annual British match run with broadly similar rules
- Elcho Shield, an annual fullbore competition out to 1200 yd (1100 m) with no sighting shots
- Fullbore target rifle, generic term for Palma and F-Class
- High power rifle and Civilian Marksmanship Program, U.S. variants
- International T-Class Confederation (ITCC)
- List of shooting sports organizations
