= Service rifle =

Rifle issued to military personnel

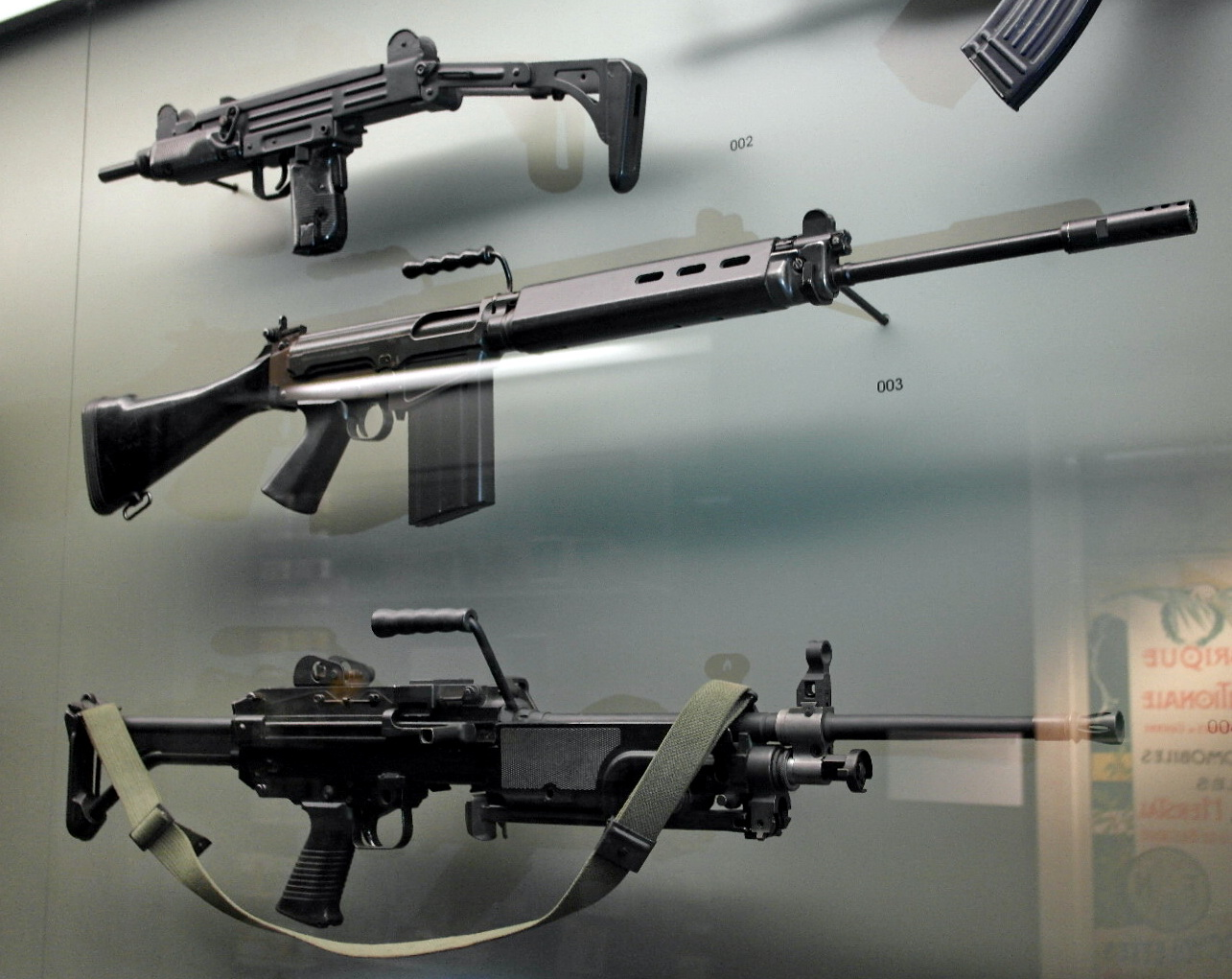
An Uzi submachine gun, FN FAL battle rifle, and FN Minimi light machine gun—common service weapons in the Western world during the mid-to-late 20th century—displayed at the Curtius Museum in Liège, Belgium

A service rifle (or standard-issue rifle) is any rifle a military issues to its regular soldiers or infantry. In modern militaries, this is generally a versatile, rugged, and reliable assault rifle or battle rifle, suitable for use in nearly all environments and is effective in most combat situations. Service rifles are solely designated and used as the primary weapon in almost all instances of warfare and training. Almost all modern militaries are also issued service pistols as sidearms to accompany their service rifles. The term can also be used to describe weapons issued by non-military forces, such as law enforcement or paramilitaries.

If the issued weapon is not a rifle or carbine, but instead a different type of firearm intended to serve in a specialized role such as a combat shotgun, submachine gun, or light machine gun, it is called a service firearm or service weapon.

== History ==
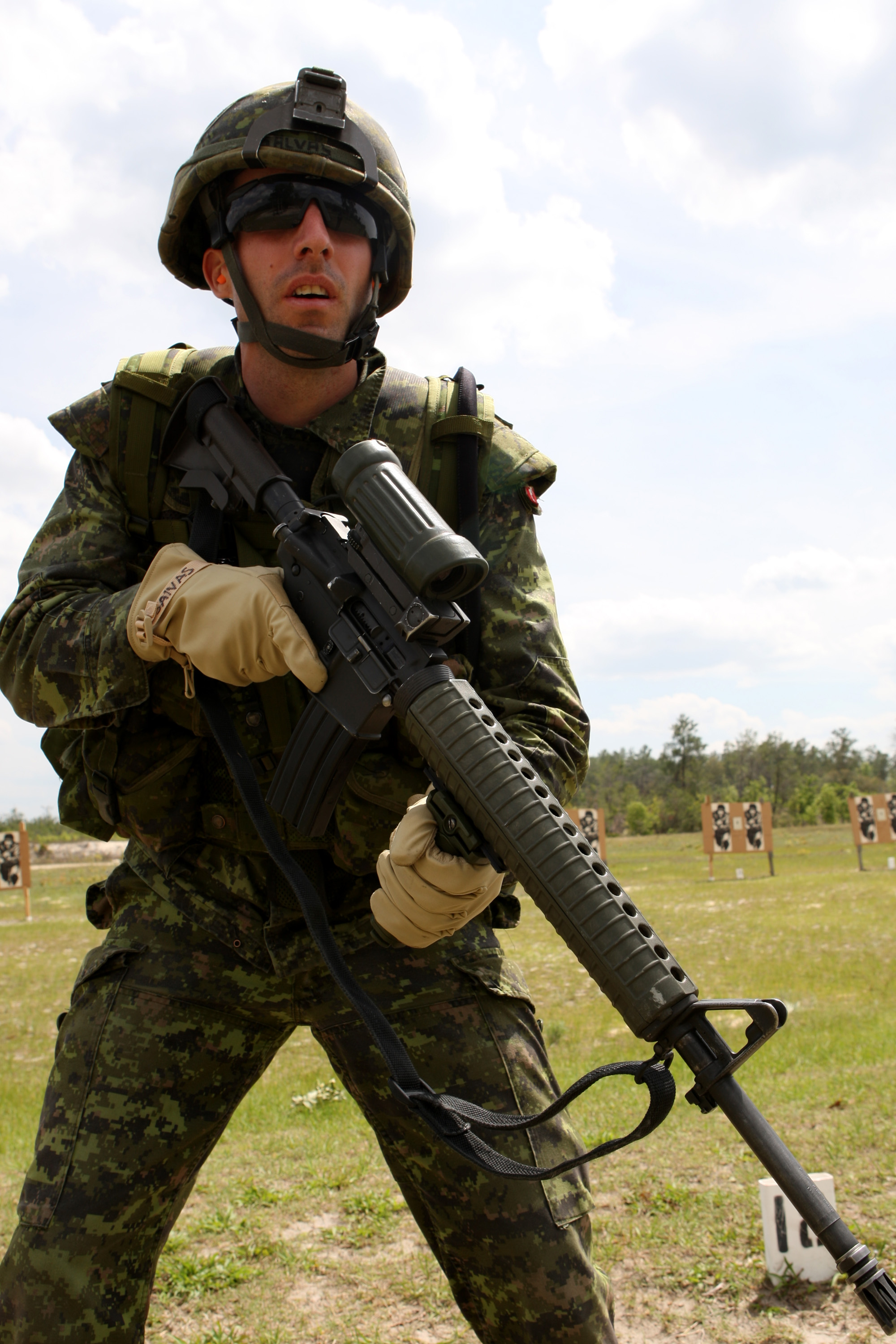
A Canadian Army soldier with his Colt Canada C7A2 service rifle

Firearms with rifled barrels existed long before the 19th century, but were not widely used until the mid-19th century in conflicts such as the Crimean War and American Civil War. Thus, rifles in the early 19th century were for specialist marksmen only, whilst ordinary infantry were issued less accurate smoothbore muskets which had a higher rate of fire, with bore diameters as high as 19 mm (0.75 inch). Early "service rifles" of the 1840s and 1850s, such as the Swiss Infanteriegewehr Modell 1842, the British Pattern 1853 Enfield, and the American Springfield Model 1840 and Springfield Model 1855 were all muzzleloading muskets.

Ordnance rifles were introduced in the 1860s and 1870s, with the French Chassepot Model 1866, the Swiss Peabody Gewehr Modell 1867, and the Prussian Mauser Model 1871. In the United States, the Springfield Model 1873 was the first single-shot breech-loading rifle adopted by the United States War Department for manufacture and widespread issue to U.S. troops.

The development of Poudre B smokeless powder in 1884, introduced with the French Lebel Model 1886 rifle, spelt the end of gunpowder warfare and led to a jump in small arms development. By the beginning of World War I, all of the world's major powers had adopted repeating bolt-action rifles, such as the British Lee–Enfield, the German Gewehr 98, and the Russian Mosin–Nagant.

During the Second World War, the United States adopted the M1 Garand, which was the first widely adopted semi-automatic rifle that was brought into military service in 1936. Despite advancements in rifle technology, the United States was the only country to adopt a semi-automatic rifle as their primary service rifle. While other countries did develop semi-automatic rifles later on and used in limited numbers during the war. For comparison, Germany produced 402,000 Gewehr 43 rifles, compared to 14,000,000 of the Karabiner 98k (a shortened variant of the Gewehr 98). However, it was during the war that Germany also produced the StG 44, which is capable of controllable fully automatic fire from a 30-round magazine with the newly developed 7.92x33mm Kurz intermediate rifle cartridge. After the war, the StG 44 was of particular interest to the Soviet Union, whose AK-47 was derived heavily from the German design. In the 1960s and 1970s, the United States developed and produced the M16 rifle, cementing the applicability of the assault rifle as an effective and versatile combat weapon for future conflicts.

== See also ==
- List of rifles
- List of assault rifles
- Service firearm competitions
- Service pistol
