= Rugeley Rifle Club =

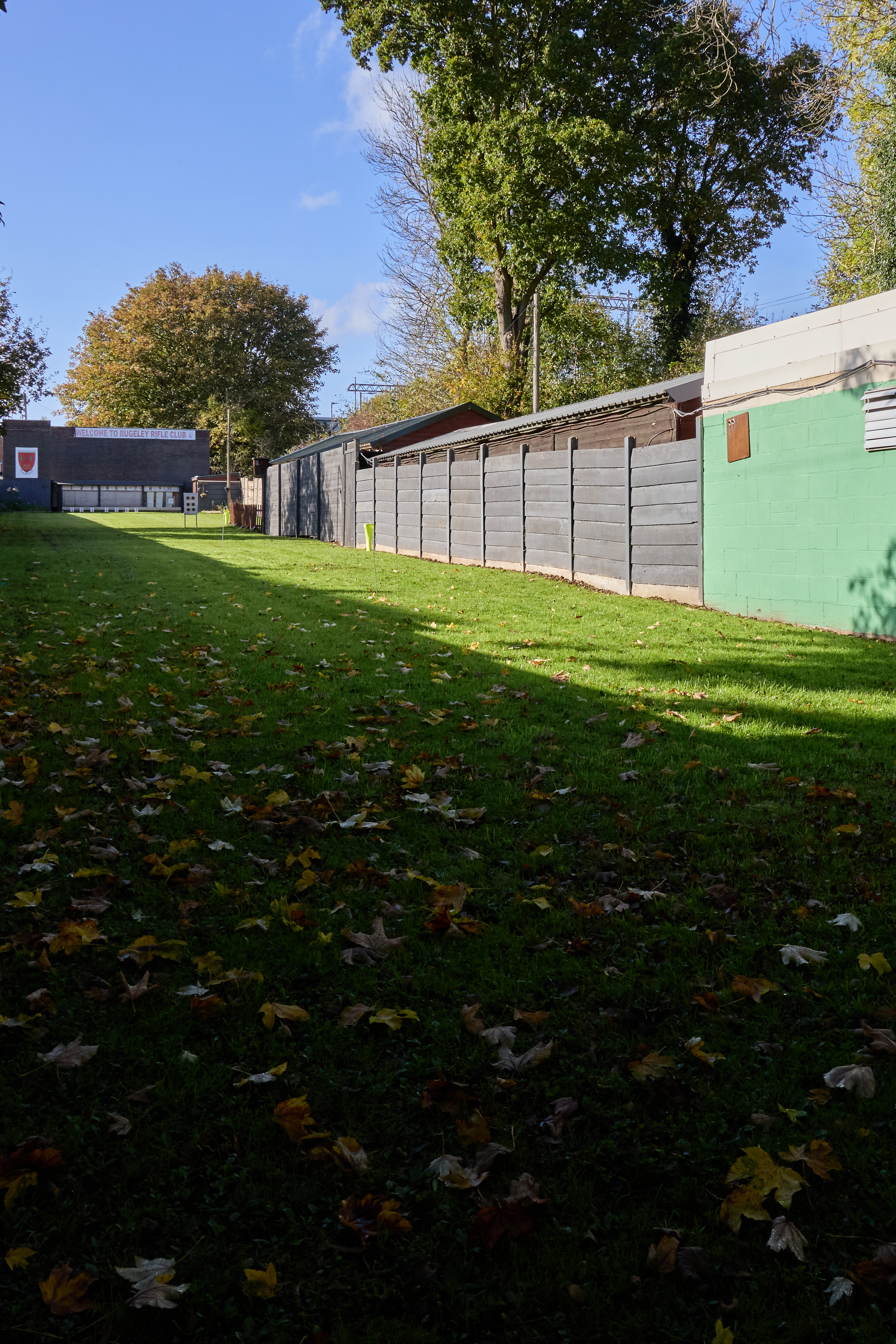
- The 100yard outdoor range
- Abbreviation: Rugeley RC; RRC
- Formation: July 17, 1900; 126 years ago
- Legal status: Sports Club
- Location: Rugeley, United Kingdom
- Fields: Shooting Sports
- Affiliations: National Small-bore Rifle Association
- Award: King's Award for Voluntary Service
- Website: www.rugeleyrifleclub.org.uk

Rugeley Rifle Club is a target shooting club in Staffordshire, England, founded in 1900. The club competes in National competitions of the National Small-bore Rifle Association shooting smallbore rifle, 10 metre air rifle and 10 metre air pistol. The club is noted for the number of members who have represented Great Britain, England and Wales. In 2024, it became the first shooting sports club in the UK to be awarded The King's Award for Voluntary Service. Developing from the Rugeley Volunteers, a standalone club was first founded in July 1900. The club folded in 1935 but was reformed around 1950.

== History ==
=== First Era ===
Newspapers refer to a "Rifle Club" at least as far back as 1885. These appear to have been members of the local Volunteers movement. However, a formally constituted club was not set up until 17 July 1900 at the encouragement of Colonel W. A. Wetherall, affiliating to the National Rifle Association. Despite being located close to Cannock Chase, the military authorities were unable to offer range accommodation at Rugeley, and members travelled to Hednesford to use the military ranges there.

Newspaper reports indicate that by 1905, the club was also shooting "miniature" (Small-bore) rifle, in competition with clubs from Stafford, Chester and elsewhere under the auspices of the Society of Miniature Rifle Clubs. This was conducted using centrefire rifles fitted with Morris Tube apparatus to accommodate smaller calibre rounds for use on indoor ranges. The club earned some national fame when Mr A. Playfer won the Conan Doyle match at the 1908 Imperial Meeting. A site on Brewery Street was first used for an indoor "miniature" range, later moving to a purpose built range on Bow Street. Outdoor shooting took place at Hednesford, Lichfield, Cannock Chase and a miniature range in Rugeley Quarry.

The club folded in 1935. Following the winding up, the balance of £12 10s was donated to the Rugeley District Hospital.

=== Second Era ===
By 1951 the club had been reformed, led by two Police officers - Constable Alfred Lines and Superintendent J. Brooks. The club initially operated from the old "Drill hall" on Brewery Street.

In 1952, the club numbered around 30 and opened membership to women. The membership expanded as a works rifle club from the Lancashire Dynamo and Electronic Products works in Brereton was formed, supported by the Rugeley club.

In 1954 planning permission was given for a range and clubroom on Wharf Road. However, this does not appear to have come to fruition and in August 1960 the club moved to new premises in a former Gas Board building on Mill Lane. Spread over three floors, the premises included a substantial social space accommodating darts, snooker and table tennis, with an indoor range on the third floor. The club bought the premises in 1963. The nearest outdoor range however was the Staffordshire County range at Baldwin's Gate. Plans were developed for an outdoor range at Chetwynd Coppice, but opposed by the Forestry Commission despite support from the local council.

In 1964, Staffordshire won the Queen Alexandra Cup for the first time, with three members of the club included on the county's 6-person team. The club also won the Pidduck Shield for the first time - for the top team of 10 from any town in Staffordshire.

In 1969, the club completed an outdoor range at Wharf Road on the site of a former coal-loading yard adjacent to the railway. A new clubhouse and indoor range were completed by April 1971 and formally opened by J. Coghlan, secretary of the Central Council of Physical Recreation. The Mill Lane range was sold to pay for the move.

In November 1981, club secretary Joe Bradbury received the "Administrator of the Year" award from the Cannock Chase Sports Council.

In November 2019, the club unveiled a defibrillator in association with the Staffordshire & District Community First Responders

In 2022, the club supported British Shooting in bringing the National Finals of the Schools Shooting Championships to Cannock Chase Leisure Centre, providing volunteer range officers and administrative staff.

In October 2023, the club gained NSRA Performance Club status. The club is also recognised as a British Shooting Olympic and Paralympic Hub club.

== Club titles and honours ==
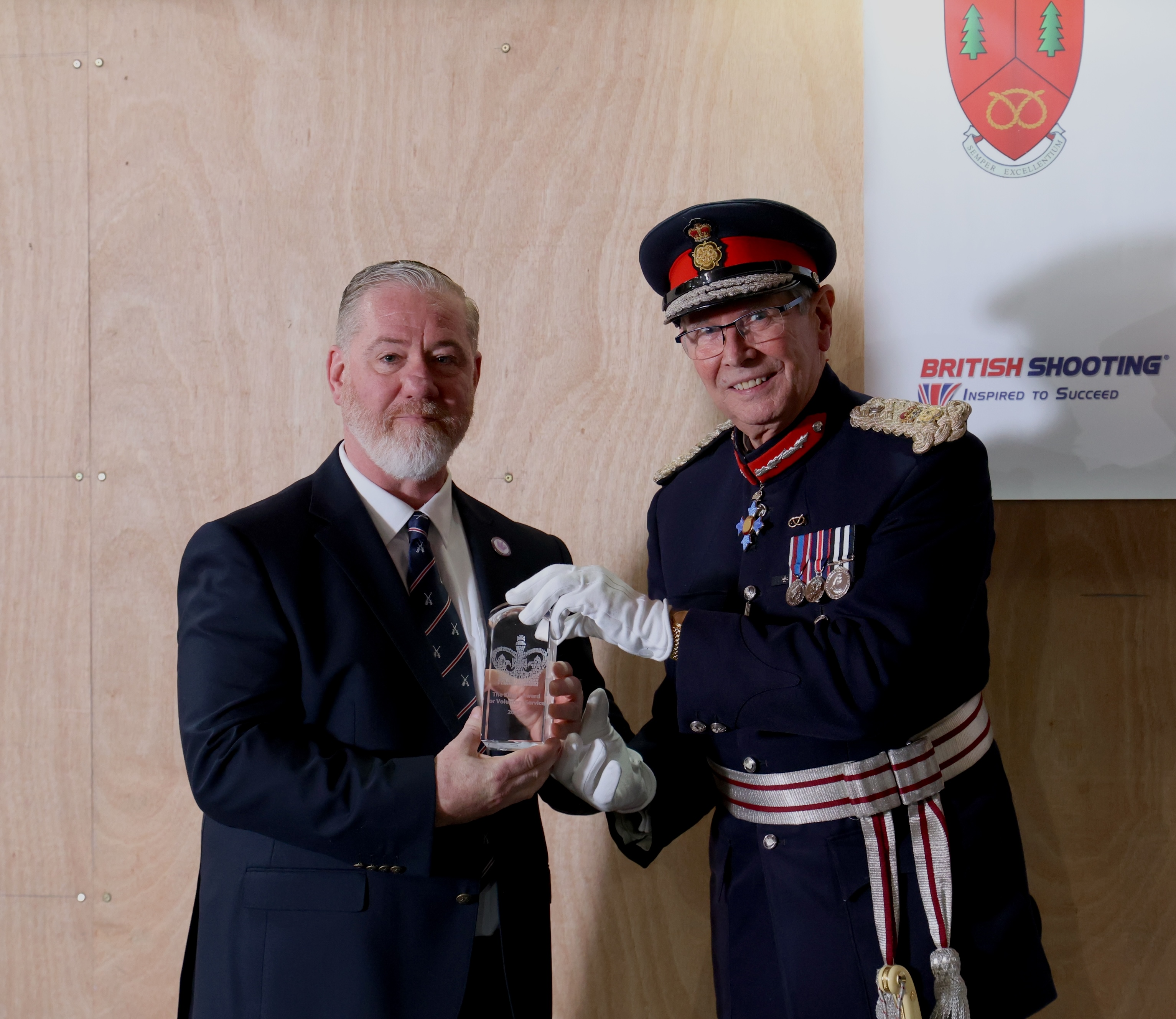
Lord Lieutenant Sir Ian Dudson presents the King's Award to Club Chairman Martyn Buttery

On 14 November 2024, the club was honoured with the King's Award for Voluntary Service - the equivalent of an MBE for organisations. The award was formally presented on 28th March 2025 at the club's annual prizegiving.

In January 2025, the club was recognised with the British Shooting "Target Change" Award for "an organisation or group of people who have made a positive difference towards making Target Shooting a more inclusive sport, engaging more and more diverse people through their efforts."

== Notable members ==
- Megan Bamsey, GB & Wales
- Olivia Beech, GB & England
- Martyn Buttery, captain of England teams, captain of GB Drew Team, adjutant GB Dewar Team
- John Hall, Olympian & European Championship Silver Medallist
- Pam Hood - GB Randle Team & England Home Countries

== See also ==
- Aberdeen University Rifle Club
- Borough of Wandsworth Rifle Club
- Stock Exchange Rifle Club
