= Aberdeen University Rifle Club =

- Abbreviation: AURC
- Formation: 1964; 62 years ago
- Legal status: Sports Club
- Location: Aberdeen, United Kingdom
- Fields: Shooting Sports
- Affiliations: Scottish Target Shooting; National Small-bore Rifle Association
- Website: www.ausa.org.uk/sports/club/rifle/

Aberdeen University Rifle Club is one of four student rifle clubs competing in the Scottish Student Sport Rifle Competition Circuit. The club currently trains with Robert Gordon's University Rifle Club.

The University of Aberdeen are known to have entered The Aberdeenshire and District Smallbore Shooting Association regional shooting competitions as far back as 1919 under the name of the "OTC". These competitions are now being won 90 years later by the Aberdeen University Rifle Club. The club used to be known as the Aberdeen University Small Arms Club (AUSAC).

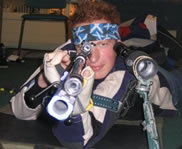

== Facilities ==
The club originally shot under Elphinstone Hall in the heart of the University of Aberdeen campus, with a later move to the Portlethen Club where they shared the range. In the 1990s the Aberdeen University Rifle Club moved to the Denwood Target Shooting Centre, which boasts a 20 lane 50m range, a 20 lane 100 yard range and a multipurpose indoor 25 yard range with the capacity for 10m air rifle. The club room includes a kitchen, pool table and large social area. This facility is unequalled in Scotland and is the finest range in Scotland.

== Domestic competitions ==
The Aberdeen University Rifle Club currently competes in Scottish Student Sport and British Universities and Colleges Sport as core competitions. Outwith the university competitions, the club has members that compete in NSRA, STS and county association competitions. The stand out success being defeating Bon Accord Rifle Club, who hold the British Record and were defending champions in the British Club Championships in 2008. The university team recorded the highest score in the country for this round.

== University competitions ==
The Aberdeen University Rifle Club has been a standout sport for the University of Aberdeen in the past. The club led the SUS competition table for numerous awards and often completed clean sweeps in the SUS competitions. In recent times, success at the Aberdeen University Rifle Club has been illustrated by individual members taking medals in the Scottish Student Sport Rifle Grand Prix Series and Championships as well as a bronze medal in the 2018 BUCS Indoor Championships.

== University of Aberdeen competitions ==
The club's success has been recognised in past years by either the club or a member winning all five of the universities sports trophies on at least one occasion.

The AJM Edwards Memorial Award- Awarded to an individual who has made an outstanding contribution to University sport over a number of years.

Centenary Cup- This cup is presented to an individual or team who excels in a single event during the previous sporting season.

The Sandy Morrison Memorial Trophy- Presented to an individual who has performed to an exceptionally high level at his or her chosen sport.

The Allender Memorial Trophy- This is awarded to the most deserving club at the discretion of the Blues Committee, which consider competitive performances, as well as fund-raising, social events, training and tours. Basically it's our club of the year trophy.

Furthermore, significant recognition has occurred with SUS awarding two of their three prestigious awards to the Aberdeen University Rifle Club. This is against all 17 Scottish Universities approximately 500 club and representative teams. Gordon Cox won the first ever volunteer of the year award in 2007 and the club won best team award in 2009. Victoria Walls was the 2017/18 winner of the Sandy Morrison Memorial Trophy, crowning her Athlete of the Year.

== International representation ==
The rifle club has a long history of international representation. There are many British and Scottish records held by past and present students of the club. Currently nine past and present students of the University of Aberdeen can be found in the Scottish national squad. Many of these have gone on to represent Great Britain on the world stage.

There have been notable ad hoc success for the club's members such as the Scottish Commonwealth youth runner up and the award for the best City of Aberdeen sporting student.

=== World Cups ===
There have been numerous representatives from the University of Aberdeen but currently the only medal winner is Neil Stirton who won silver at Munich World Cup 2008.

=== 2006 Melbourne Commonwealth Games ===
Name	Status	Sport/Event	Position
Graham Rudd	Student	Men's Individual Air Rifle	9th
Graham Rudd	Student	Men's Pairs Air Rifle	8th
Graham Rudd	Student	Men's Individual 3 Positions Rifle	11th
Graham Rudd	Student	Men's Pairs 3 Positions Rifle	4th
Heather Rudd	Student	Women's Individual Air Rifle	12th
Heather Rudd	Student	Women's Pairs Air Rifle	8th
Neil Stirton	Alum	Men's Individual 50m Rifle	9th
Neil Stirton	Alum	Men's Pairs 50m Rifle	Silver

=== 2010 Delhi Commonwealth Games ===
Name	Status	Sport/Event	Position
Graham Rudd	Alum	Men's Individual Air Rifle	11th
Neil Stirton	Alum	Men's Individual 50m Prone Rifle	5th
Neil Stirton	Alum	Men's Pairs 50m Prone Rifle	Gold
Neil Stirton	Alum	Men's Individual 3 Positions Rifle	9th
Neil Stirton	Alum	Men's Pairs 3 Positions Rifle	Bronze
Kay Copland	Student	Women's Individual 3 Positions Rifle	11th
Kay Copland	Student	Women's Pairs 3 Positions Rifle	Bronze
Kay Copland	Student	Women's Individual 50m Prone Rifle	13th
Kay Copland	Student	Women's Pairs 50m Prone Rifle	Gold

=== University representation ===
==== Great Britain ====
The Aberdeen University Rifle Club has had members represent Great Britain at the World University Games. These students have included Heather Rudd, James Paterson and Jonty Barron.

==== Scotland ====
The Scottish Universities Smallbore Rifle team would annually contain numerous University of Aberdeen students. It has not been unheard of for the winning Scottish team at the Home Nations international to be made up of and captained by 75% University of Aberdeen students.

== See also ==
- Dublin University Rifle Club
- Rugeley Rifle Club
- Stock Exchange Rifle Club
