= Borough of Wandsworth Rifle Club =

- Abbreviation: BWRC
- Formation: 1903; 123 years ago
- Legal status: Sports Club
- Location: Earlsfield, United Kingdom
- Fields: Shooting Sports
- Affiliations: National Small-bore Rifle Association
- Website: www.wandsworthrifleclub.org.uk
- Formerly called: Earlsfield and District Rifle Club

Located in Earlsfield in South West London, England, The Borough of Wandsworth Rifle Club is one of the oldest clubs belonging to the National Smallbore Rifle Association in the United Kingdom. The club has indoor and outdoor ranges for small-bore rifle target shooting, as well as air pistol and air rifle facilities.

== History ==
The inception of the Borough of Wandsworth Rifle Club dates back to 1903 when members of the Borough of Wandsworth Council Lt Gen Sir Frederick Lance KCB and Mr F.J. Liddington started the club. Christening it the Earlsfield & District Rifle Club, they and the 70 members of the club were allowed to use the Public Baths as an indoor range during the winter.

It was in the following year that the club was renamed to the Borough of Wandsworth Rifle Club and the borough council granted a piece of land near the River Wandle of approximately two acres at a nominal rent for the erection of an indoor and outdoor range. The site is still occupied by the club.

When the First World War started, the club lived up to its motto, "For The Empire", providing facilities for drill and rifle shooting. Some 2000 men enrolled from the area and a large number of these joined the regular forces and saw action on the fronts.

The club has kept itself in the forefront of .22 rifle shooting since its earliest days Members have been selected to represent Great Britain in Olympic, Commonwealth, Nordic & World Games. Other members have been selected to represent England & Scotland at NSRA Open meetings held once a year at Bisley and Scotland. Lady Members have also been selected to shoot in their respective County Teams

== Facilities ==
The club has indoor and outdoor ranges for .22 target rifles, air pistols and air rifles. The indoor range consists of a 6 lane 25 yards (23 m) gallery for small-bore target shooting. Outdoors there is a covered point for 50 yards (46 m) and 100 yards (91 m) .22 ranges as well as 6 yards (5.5 m) and 10 metre air rifle target galleries.

== See also ==
- Aberdeen University Rifle Club
- Rugeley Rifle Club
- Stock Exchange Rifle Club
