= Lina Jones =

British sport shooter

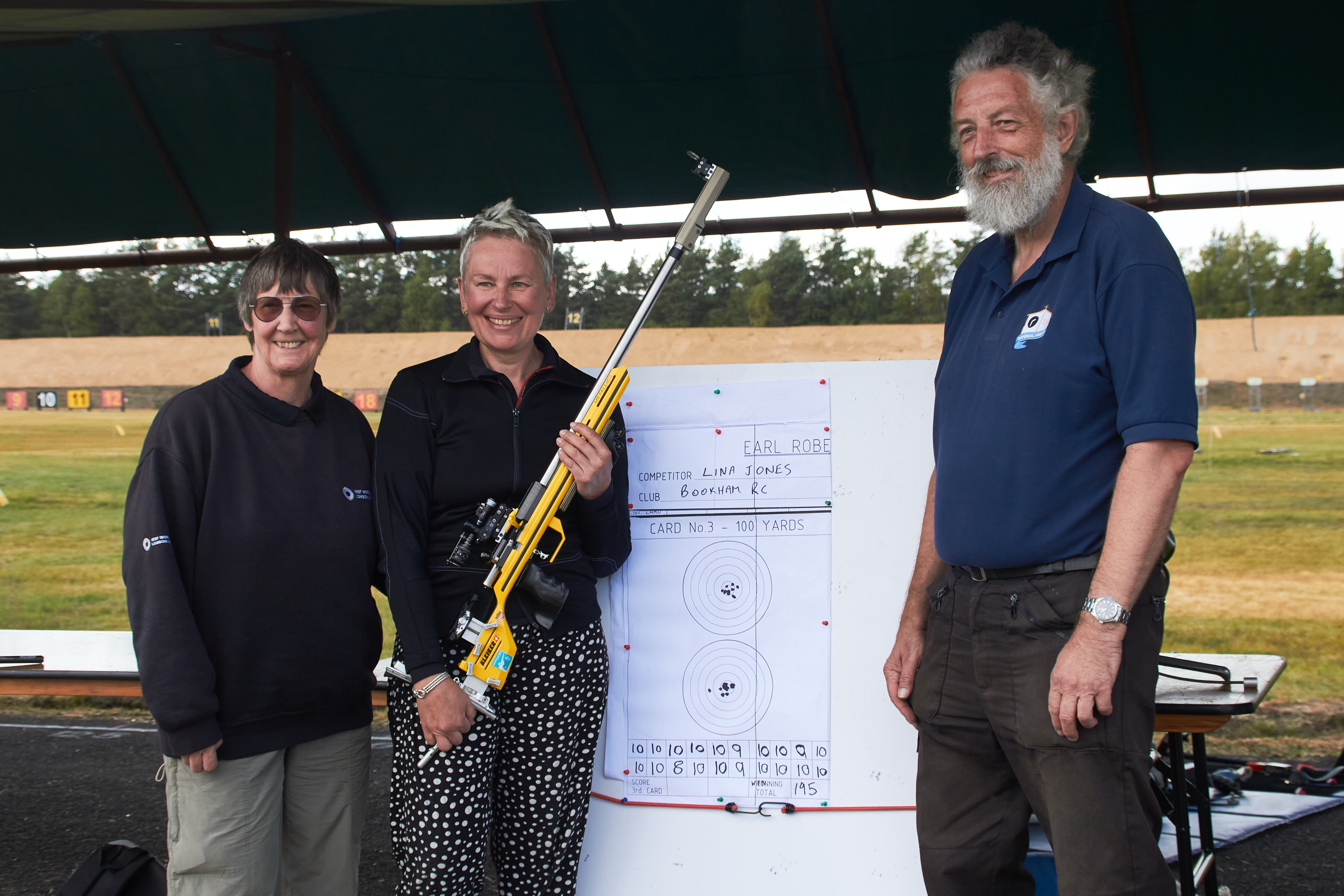
- Lina Jones (centre) after winning the 2022 British Prone Championship

Personal information
- Citizenship: British
- Born: Lina Bendaraviciute; January 13, 1968 (age 57) Kaunas, Lithuania
- Occupation: Interpreter
- Height: 162 cm (5 ft 4 in)
- Weight: 62 kg (137 lb)
- Spouse: Peter Jones

Sport
- Country: United Kingdom
- Sport: Shooting
- Event: 50-metre rifle prone
- Club: Bookham Rifle Club
- Coached by: Michael Babb

Lina Jones (née Bendaraviciute; born 13 January 1968) is a British sports shooter. As of 2023, she has won the British Prone Championship three times, including back-to-back wins in 2022 and 2023. She has represented England at two Commonwealth Games. She represented Great Britain at the 2014 ISSF World Championships and 2015 European Shooting Championships.

== Early life ==
Lina started shooting at the age of eight with a rifle club in her hometown of Kaunas, Lithuania. In the run up to the 1980 Moscow Olympics, Lithuania hosted some events of the Spartakiad and a world-class range was built close to her home. In 1986 she was awarded Master of Sport of the Soviet Union and studied sport shooting and physical education at university.

Following Lithuanian independence in 1991, Lina met an English shooter John Miller, who was visiting Lithuania to shoot. Miller invited Lina to shoot at the British Small-bore Championships at Bisley. She later moved to the UK to work, meeting her future husband Peter Jones. The couple married in 1993.

== Shooting career ==
Between 1986 and 1991 Jones became Lithuanian women's champion in 50-metre prone rifle, 50-metre three-position rifle and 10-metre air rifle.

In 2012 Jones was selected as a reserve for the British team travelling to the 2013 Pershing Match.

Jones represented Great Britain at the 2014 ISSF World Shooting Championships in Granada, where she placed 28th and set a new British Women's record in the 50m Prone Rifle event.

Jones was selected to represent England in the Women's Prone Rifle event at the 2014 and 2018 Commonwealth Games. She qualified for the finals at both Games, finishing fifth in 2014 and fourth in 2018.
