= Ruth Mwandumba =

British sports shooter

Personal information
- Full name: Ruth Pemphero Mwandumba
- Citizenship: British; Malawian
- Born: 6 August 1995 (age 31)
- Education: University of East London; Liverpool John Moores University; University of Manchester

Sport
- Country: United Kingdom
- Sport: Shooting sport
- Event: 10 m air rifle
Medal record
Women's shooting
Representing United Kingdom
ISSF Grand Prix
Bronze medal – third place	2023 Ruse	10m Air Rifle
Representing England
CSF(ED)
Silver medal – second place	2018 Northern Ireland	10m Air Rifle
Bronze medal – third place	2018 Northern Ireland	50m Prone Rifle
Bronze medal – third place	2022 Wales	10m Air Rifle
Bronze medal – third place	2022 Wales	10m Air Rifle Mixed Team

Ruth Pemphero Mwandumba is a British sport shooter, specialising in 10 metre air rifle. She has been English Champion twice, and has set two British records. She medalled twice at the 2022 Commonwealth Shooting Federation Championships.

== Personal life ==
Born in the UK to Malawian parents, Mwandumba grew up in Merseyside, attending St Mary's College, Crosby. She studied Medical Physiology at the University of East London, and gained an MSc in International Public Health at Liverpool John Moores University.

In 2024, she won the Pride of Sefton Award for her sporting performance and work on the #TargetChange initiative.

She gave birth to twins in 2025.

== Shooting career ==
Mwandumba started shooting through her school's cadet contingent.

Whilst at university, she joined the Stock Exchange Rifle Club, learning to shoot air rifle and smallbore rifle.

In February 2018 she was selected to represent England at InterShoot, becoming the first black woman and second black person to represent England in shooting sports (after Nathan Sutherland).

She became English Women's Air Rifle Champion for the first time in 2018. At the Commonwealth Shooting Federation (European Division) Championships in September 2018 she won a silver medal in the 10 metre air rifle and bronze in the 50 metre prone rifle.

Mwandumba gained wider prominence in 2020 when she was featured in an editorial in The Daily Telegraph, discussing race and sport.

In 2022 Mwandumba launched the #TargetChange campaign with British Shooting, the Womens Sport Alliance and Eley. The project ran "have-a-go" days around the UK to change the perceptions of target shooting sports and encourage participation from more diverse communities.

In 2023, Mwandumba signed with Lacoste as a brand ambassdor, alongside Olympians Ashleigh Johnson and Marcel Nguyen.

In 2024, Mwandumba was a non-travelling reserve for TeamGB to the Paris 2024 Olympic Games.

In January 2025, Mwandumba was selected for the 2025 European 10metre Championships whilst expecting twins.
