= Target rifle =

Target rifle may refer to:

- Fullbore target rifle, a rifle shooting-sport governed by the International Confederation of Fullbore Rifle Associations
- Smallbore rifle shooting, a set of disciplines of shooting sports using smaller-calibre rifles
- Target rifle, a rifle used in shooting sports
