= Stock Exchange Rifle Club =

The Stock Exchange Rifle Club is located in the City of London. While the origins of the club were once linked to the Stock Exchange, membership is open to all and the current membership is drawn from all walks of life. The majority either tend to live or work near central London and the "square mile". The club was one of the first formed in the United Kingdom in the aftermath of the Boer War to meet the need to recruit soldiers who could already shoot. It is a Registered Charity.

The City range of the club is located under London Bridge, and all City-based shooting is done there.

The club is also active in long range target rifle shooting and is based for this purpose at the National Shooting Centre, Bisley (some 40 minutes drive from SW London). The Stock Exchange Rifle Club is affiliated to the well-known London and Middlesex Rifle Association - which boasts some of the best facilities and services in the Bisley complex.

== History ==
The Stock Exchange Rifle Club was founded in 1901 by Colonel (later, Sir) Robert Inglis, who responded to Lord Roberts' call to establish small-arms shooting clubs across the land. Lord Roberts, as commander-in-chief of the expeditionary force sent out to put down the Boer rebellion, had discovered that the shooting skills of his soldiers left much to be desired. After handing over to Kitchener, he returned to Britain determined to do something about it. He wanted British soldiers to be as practiced with the rifle as their famous forebears had been with the longbow.

Inglis wrote to members of the "House", that is, the Stock Exchange, of which body his firm was a member, on 18 November 1901, and by 19 December, capital had been raised, and arrangements put in place to permit practice by "at least all those Members who have had no previous knowledge of rifle shooting", every Monday and Friday, at a range in the Haymarket, SW1. A similarly-named club had been formed in New York before 1878.

The first annual prize meeting was held at Bisley on 5 July 1902. Membership already stood at 338: 178 Members of the Stock Exchange and 160 clerks.

Inglis was in his first year as Chairman of the Stock Exchange itself, and was knighted in 1910. With all his many interests, his dedication to the establishment of the Stock Exchange Rifle Club was unstinted, and by 1903 a lease had been signed for 2 Borers Passage, just off Devonshire Square, north of Houndsditch and mere yards from the Stock Exchange itself. These premises were to provide 24 rifle positions at 100 feet, and 8 pistol ranges of 75 feet.

Despite some setbacks, the new ranges were open and in use by the end of 1904, and the club's foundations were secure.

The Museum of London displays an old shooting jacket, "donated by a member of the Stock Exchange Rifle Club"

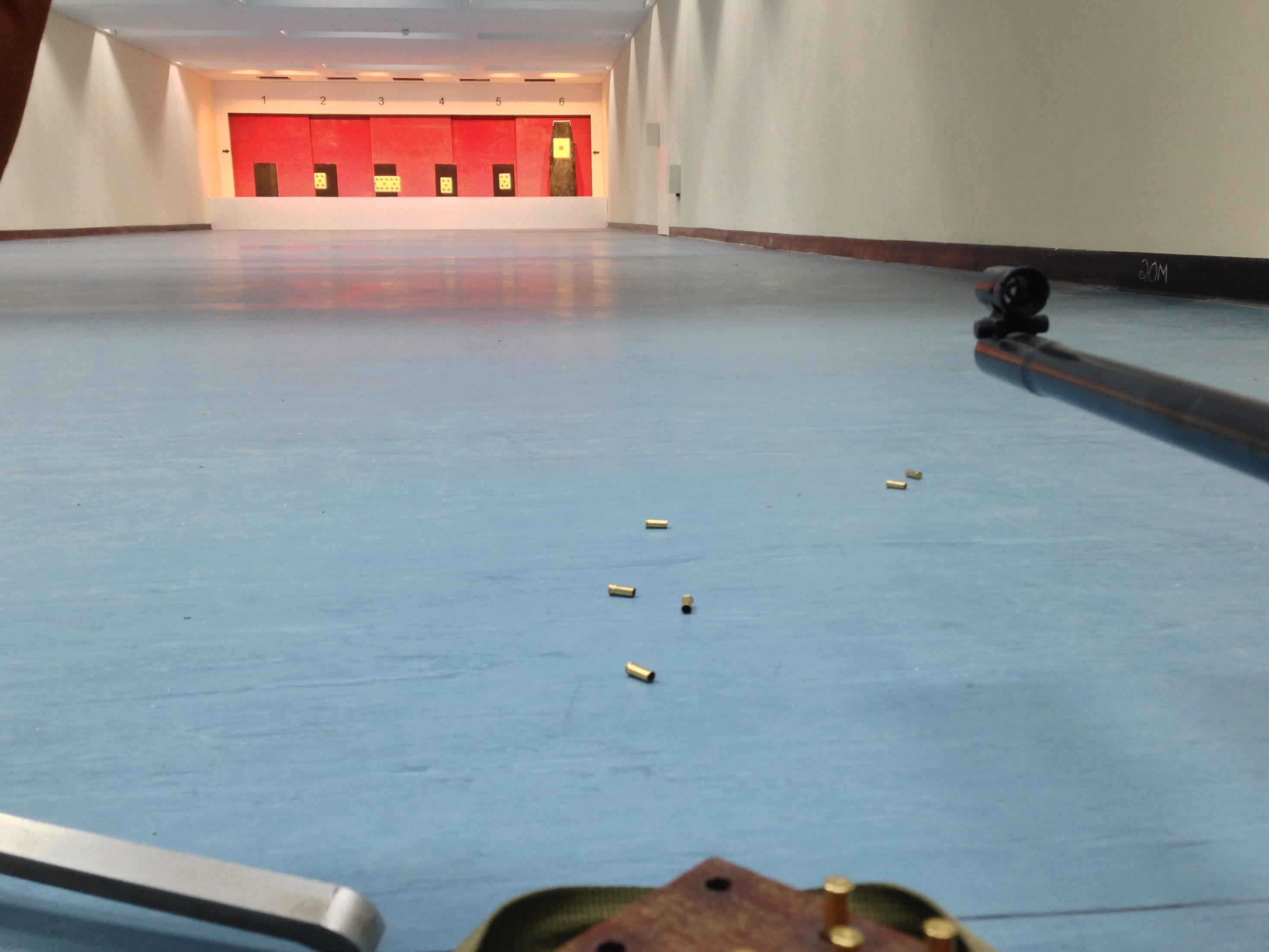
View down the main (small bore) 6-lane range at the London Bridge premises of the Stock Exchange Rifle Club/Marylebone Rifle and Pistol Club

== Facilities ==
The club has a full range of all the equipment and firearms necessary to shoot to top standards in all the current shooting disciplines. Members are regularly selected to compete for their counties and countries.

=== Smallbore ===
The City facilities are shared with the Marylebone Rifle and Pistol Club, and provide a 6-lane 25m .22 prone and gallery range and a 10m air pistol gallery. These dedicated facilities opened for shooting in April 2013 beneath London Bridge on an initial 25-year lease from the City of London Corporation, owners of the Bridge. At Bisley the Stock Exchange Rifle Club uses the Commonwealth Games facilities at Lord Roberts House, HQ of the NSRA.

=== Fullbore ===
The Stock Exchange Rifle Club also competes at Bisley using Fullbore target rifles, and members of the Club have won the coveted Queen's Prize and the Grand Aggregate.

== See also ==
- Aberdeen University Rifle Club
- Borough of Wandsworth Rifle Club
- Rugeley Rifle Club
