= Scottish Target Shooting =

Governing body for sport shooting in Scotland

- Sport: Shooting sports
- Jurisdiction: Scotland
- Abbreviation: STS
- Founded: 2015
- Affiliation: Sportscotland, CSF
- Headquarters: Edinburgh
- Chairman: Ken Silver
- CEO: Oliver Barsby
- Secretary: Oliver Barsby
- Replaced: Scottish Target Shooting Federation; Scottish Clay Target Association; Scottish Rifle Association; Scottish Pistol Association; Scottish Smallbore Rifle Association; National Rifle Club of Scotland

Official website
- www.scottishtargetshooting.co.uk
- (Scotland)

Scottish Target Shooting (STS) is the governing body for shooting sports in Scotland. STS represents and supports its clubs and members in promoting and developing shooting sports in Scotland, engaging with sportscotland, Team Scotland, the Scottish Government, British Shooting and others.

STS also administers the Scottish Performance Pathways for athletes training for the Commonwealth Games.

STS was founded in 2015 in order to merge the various shooting organisations who sat under the umbrella of the Scottish Target Shooting Federation.
