= Clay Pigeon Shooting Association =

Sports governing body in England

- Sport: ISSF and FITASC Shooting Sports
- Jurisdiction: England
- Abbreviation: CPSA
- Founded: 1928
- Affiliation: British Shooting, British International Clay Target Shooting Federation
- Headquarters: National Shooting Centre, Surrey
- Chairman: John Martin
- CEO: Iain Parker

Official website
- www.cpsa.co.uk
- (England)

The Clay Pigeon Shooting Association (CPSA) is the national governing body for clay pigeon shooting in England.

Founded in 1928, it is recognised by Sport England, the Department of the Environment, the Home Office, the Police etc. and it is a constituent member of the International Clay Pigeon Shooting Council of Great Britain and Ireland and is represented on The World Forum on the Future of Sport Shooting Activities through the British Shooting Sports Council.

Its main roles are to promote and encourage the development of the sport; to liaise with government departments and police to represent the interests of CPSA members, including providing specific civil liability insurance cover and advice for its members; to regulate and develop all aspects of the sport (technical and otherwise); to promote and organise national competitions, some of which are staged by the CPSA and to select England teams for major international events, including the Olympics.

Clay pigeon shooting (including sporting clays) is a strongly supported sport with, according to its website, a CPSA membership of approximately 25,000 participating at all shooting levels, from farm and syndicate shoots through to national, registered and International competitions.

The CPSA regulates the standards of safety and competition at 450 affiliated and registered grounds around the country.

In 2006, the CPSA founded the National Association of Target Shooting Sports (NATSS) working group in association with the NSRA and NRA, to explore the practicalities and benefits of a merger between the bodies. The project was shelved in July 2009 following the withdrawal of the CPSA.

== See also ==
- List of British sport shooters
