= Dublin University Rifle Club =

Sports club at Trinity College, Dublin, Ireland

- Founded: 1962; 63 years ago
- Location: Dublin, Ireland, (Republic of Ireland)
- President: Ray Reilly
- Coaching Staff: Dennis Hardman, Siobhan Scarlett
- Club Captain: Joseph McDonnell
- Vice-President(s): Larry T. D.
- Club Colours
- Affiliation: Target Shooting Ireland (TSI); Dublin University Central Athletic Club (D.U.C.A.C)
- Chief Range Officer: Patrick Lynch

Dublin University Rifle Club (DURC) is the rifle club of Trinity College, located in Dublin, Ireland. The club competes in a number of Olympic shooting disciplines including air rifle and small bore. Its members include students, alumni and staff from Trinity College.

== Early history ==
While there are records of competitive shooting in Trinity College (beyond that of duelling) going back as far as 1840, the club in its present session was founded in January 1962 by P.G.L. Coulson (who went on to become its first Captain), M.C.C. Heaton (first Secretary) and C.R. Oakley (first Treasurer). In its first year the club had over 50 members yet no range and virtually no equipment. The first record of anyone shooting was as part of a team sent to Bisley in July 1962 competing in fullbore events. The first Chief Range Officer (C.R.O.) was appointed in 1964, the post was held by M.C.C. Heaton, and with that the first Range was established and approved by the College Board for the Lincoln gate end of College in May 1964 and by October of that year the C.R.O. reported it operational. The initial annual membership fee was £5 p.a. and affiliation to Dublin University Central Athletics Committee was completed by November 1964 but at this point the club still sought Garda approval for the range. This was to be granted in January 1965 and so two years after the foundation the first shot was fired on Trinity soil.

At the 1965 A.G.M. M.C.C. Heaton a founder member of the club and its first Pink, was made a vice president of the club in honour of his services and achievements. By the end of 1966 the club had a membership of over one hundred people and a ladder system of the challenge type was introduced. By May 1967 a system akin to the present ladder was introduced with constantly revised averages being posted. The first recorded lady on committee was a Miss J Johnston who was elected at the 1969 A.G.M. and in October 1970 Captain John Martin became a vice president and the move to the new Park Lane range was completed. In January 1972 D.U.R.C. lost its main colours opponents as Queen's University Belfast were no longer permitted to shoot during the "Troubles" in Northern Ireland, henceforth the club would have to look further a-field for Intervarsity matches.

== Notable members ==
- Anthony Traill (1858) 33rd Provost of Trinity College Dublin. Honorary Treasurer of Dublin University Rifle Club
- John Pentland Mahaffy (1869)' 34th Provost of Trinity College Dublin. Honorary Treasurer of Dublin University Rifle Club. Described by Oscar Wilde as his "First and greatest teacher".
