= Smallbore rifle shooting =

Set of target shooting disciplines

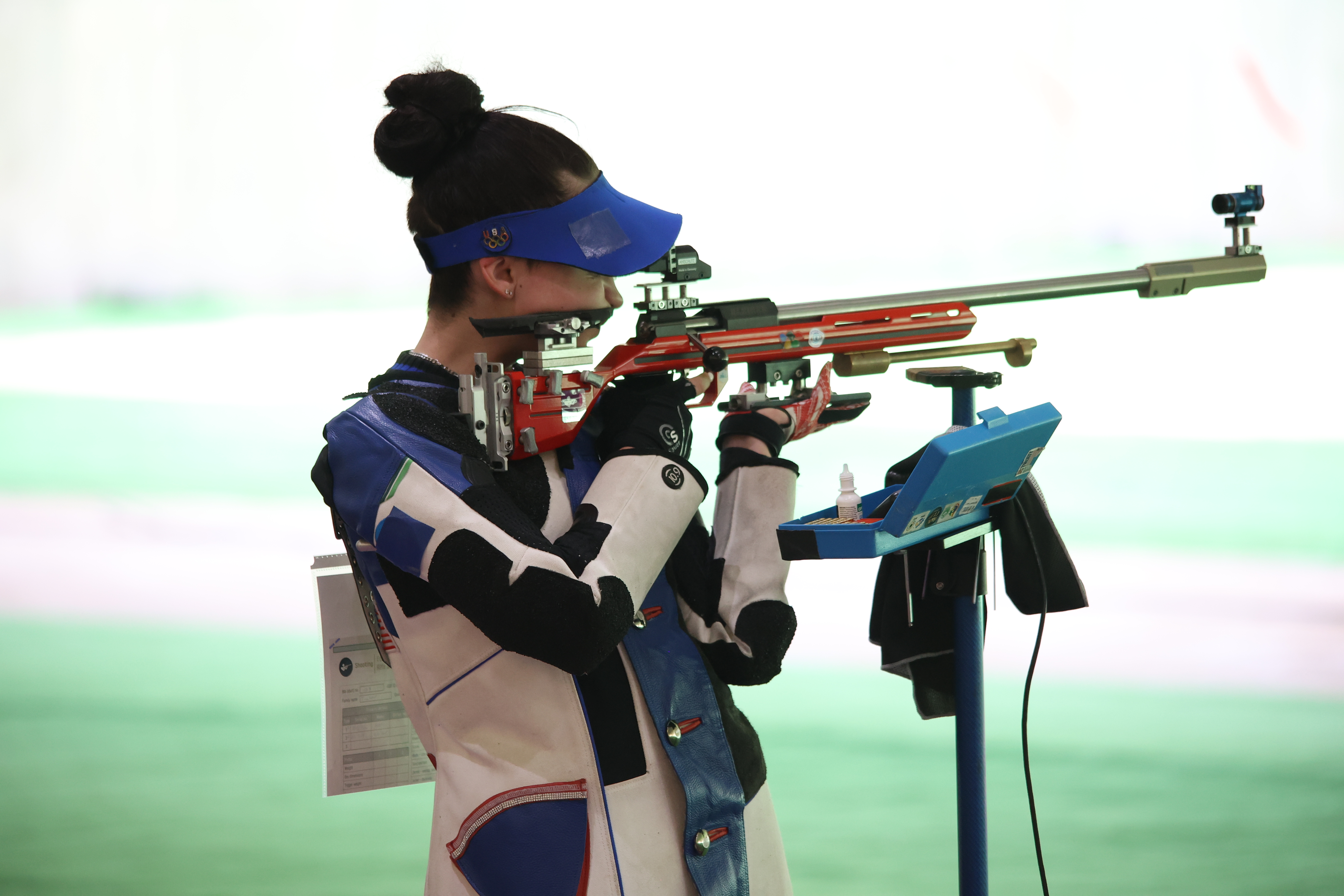
- A shooter firing a Bleiker smallbore rifle in the standing position.
- Highest governing body: Several organizations, see list
- Nicknames: Shooting

Characteristics
- Contact: No
- Team members: Yes or no, depending on competition
- Mixed-sex: Yes or no, depending on discipline
- Type: Indoor or outdoor
- Venue: Shooting range

Presence
- Olympic: Yes
- World Championships: Yes
- Paralympic: Yes

Smallbore rifle shooting, sometimes known (particularly in the United Kingdom) as miniature rifle shooting, is a set of disciplines of shooting sports. Smallbore shooting uses smaller-calibre rifles, typically chambered in .22 Long Rifle, at ranges generally of 100 yards (91 m) or shorter. Depending on the range, it can either be conducted indoors or outdoors.

Smallbore shooting is contrasted with fullbore rifle shooting, which uses larger, higher-powered calibres, and is almost universally conducted outdoors.

Historically, smallbore shooting has been most popular in the United Kingdom and the former British Empire, particularly Australia, Canada, South Africa and New Zealand. It is also popular in the United States, and has a substantial following in continental Europe, particularly France, Germany and Switzerland. It forms part of the Olympic and Paralympic Games, and has a world championships hosted by the International Shooting Sport Federation.

== History ==
=== Early history ===
Organised rifle shooting for sport largely developed in the 19th century. Switzerland was one of the first countries to establish a national shooting federation, in 1824. Similar organisations were founded in Britain, France and Germany in the mid-nineteenth century, followed by the National Rifle Association of America in 1871. Smallbore shooting first became possible in 1845, when the French gun-maker Nicholas Flaubert developed the first .22 calibre rimfire rifle cartridge. However, it was originally treated largely as a recreational pastime, and considered the "poor cousin" of fullbore shooting, conducted with military-style rifles. This began to change in the United Kingdom from the turn of the 20th century, in the United States from 1918, and in Germany from the early 1920s.

=== United Kingdom ===
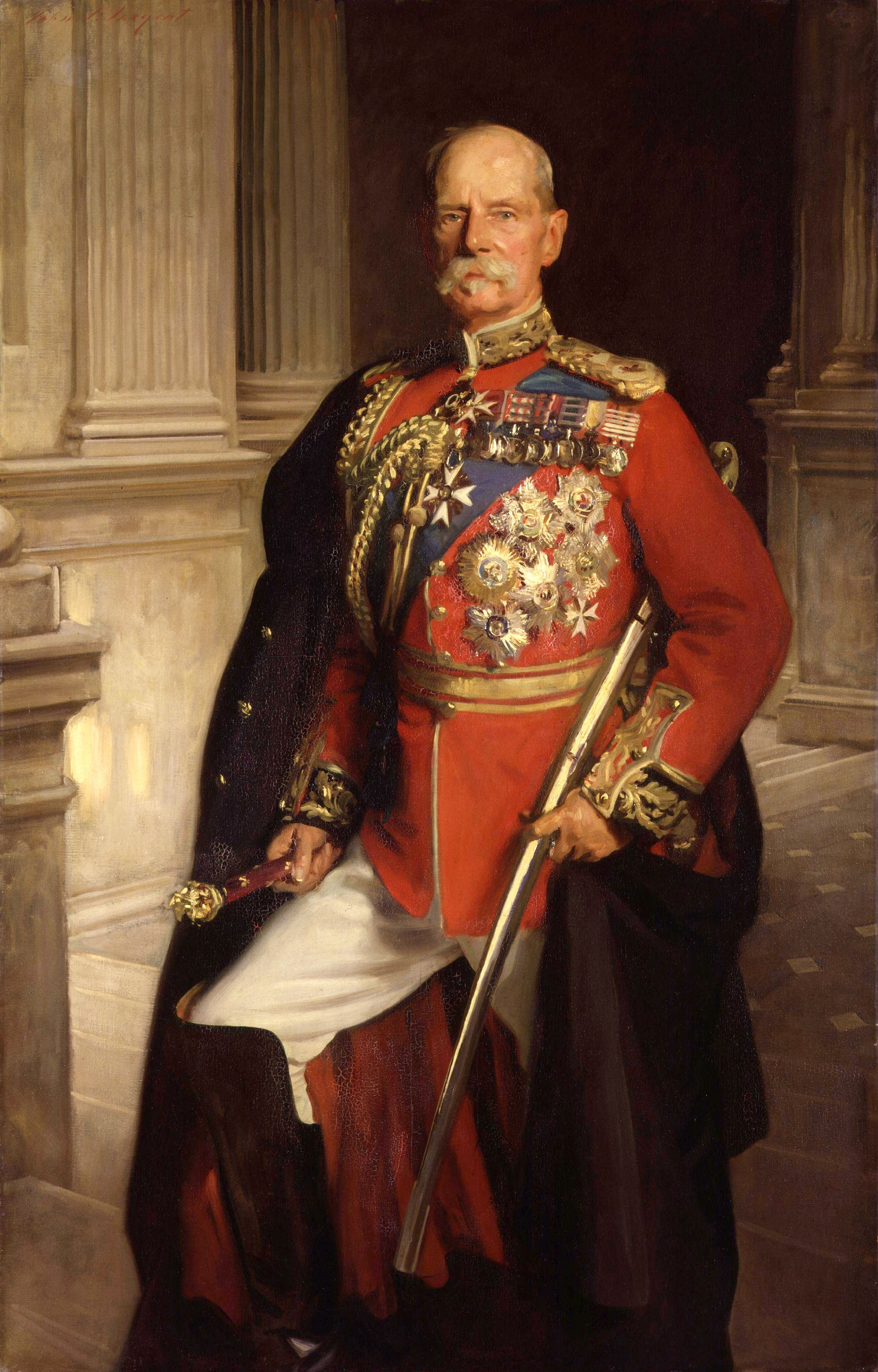
A 1906 portrait of Frederick Roberts, 1st Earl Roberts by John Singer Sargent. Roberts was instrumental in the promotion of smallbore shooting in the United Kingdom, and in the foundation of what became the National Smallbore Rifle Association.

In the United Kingdom, the outbreak of the Second Boer War in 1899 saw a series of defeats for the British Army, particularly during the so-called Black Week of 10–15 December 1899, in which British forces were defeated at Stormberg, Magersfontein and Colenso. British veterans of and commentators on the war considered the high standard of Boer marksmanship to have been a decisive factor in their success, and identified this marksmanship as a consequence of the "rifle culture" of Boer society, leading to efforts to encourage British soldiers and civilians to gain a similar familiarity and practice with firearms. A particularly prominent critic of British marksmanship was Lord Frederick Roberts, who considered that accurate shooting should be the primary aim of military training.

Britain's National Rifle Association had been founded in 1859 "for the encouragement of the Volunteer Rifle corps, and the promotion of Rifle-Shooting throughout Great Britain." (Note: The NRA's chair, Lord Elcho, in a letter to The Times, quoted in Humphry and Fremantle 1914, pages 5–6.) However, the popularity of shooting with large-calibre military rifles was constrained by the inaccessibility of suitable ranges, which required large open spaces that could only be found in rural areas, and by the cost of ammunition. Two parallel developments in the 1880s opened the possibility that marksmanship training could be made available more cheaply and to those living in towns and cities: the development of the Morris aiming tube in 1883, which could be fitted inside the barrel of a large-calibre rifle to allow it to fire small-calibre ammunition, and that of the successful .22 Long Rifle cartridge in 1887. By 1900, a smallbore rifle could be purchased for £1 or less (equivalent to £137 in 2023), within the reach of skilled urban workers and the middle classes.

In 1901, the Society of Working Men's Rifle Clubs was founded. By the end of 1902, it had nearly 80 affiliated clubs. In 1903, the SWMRC joined with the British Rifle League, itself founded in 1900, in holding a "miniature Bisley" — a shooting competition for smallbore rifles — in Crystal Palace in late March 1903. In May, the SWMRC and BRL amalgamated to form the Society of Miniature Rifle Clubs. The first National Rifle Meeting was first held at Bisley in 1922. The Society of Miniature Rifle Clubs changed its name to the National Small-bore Rifle Association in 1947.

=== United States ===
In the United States, smallbore shooting is documented from the mid-1870s, predominantly as a means of continuing to shoot during the winter months, when outdoor ranges were too cold. It grew in popularity after the First World War, and the National Rifle Association established the first national smallbore matches in August 1919. These early national smallbore matches were organised by Edward Cathcart Crossman, an officer of the US Army, with the assistance of E.J.D. Nesbitt, a British official of the Society of Miniature Rifle Clubs who had been involved in organising smallbore competitions at Bisley. The growing popularity of smallbore shooting led to demand for rifles which mirrored those used in military service but which could be used safely on shorter indoor ranges: the Winchester Model 52 rifle, manufactured from 1918 and sold commercially from 1920, was first exhibited at the 1919 National Rifle Matches, and remained one of the world's leading smallbore target rifles until the 1960s, when it was overtaken by newer Anschütz, Feinwerkbau and Walther rifles manufactured in West Germany.

From 1926 until 1933, recruits into the US Army's infantry and cavalry were required to carry out a qualification shoot with a small bore rifle.

=== France ===
French primary schools began to teach boys military drill, including skill at arms and shooting, from the 1880s. In 1881, the government ordered the production of 52,600 smallbore rifles suitable for training school pupils in marksmanship; from 1887, boys aged ten and older were required to be taught to shoot at 10 metres (11 yd) with the Flobert rifle, which used a low-powered 6mm cartridge. The practice of marksmanship training in schools was reinvigorated in 1907, but fell into abeyance after 1925.

=== Australia ===
Smallbore shooting began in Australia in the mid-nineteenth century, and rifle clubs existed in every Australian state by 1914. The sport of smallbore gained a reputation for being accepting towards female shooters. Although women's fullbore rifle matches were recorded as early as 1899, women were excluded when the Department of the Army took control of fullbore rifle clubs in 1903. Consequently, fullbore remained a male-dominated sport into the 1960s. By contrast, in 1914, every state had at least one women's smallbore shooting club.

=== Germany ===
In Germany, 'sharpshooting clubs' developed from a long-standing tradition of Schützenfeste, and became particularly popular in the 1920s as a means of recreation and in connection with various political ideologies, from republicanism to atavistic, conservative nationalism. While traditional shooting clubs (Schützenvereine) focused on fullbore shooting and generally drew their members from conservative, middle-class men, the 1920s saw the rise of 'sport shooting' clubs, often more working-class and left-wing in composition, which practised largely or entirely with smallbore rifles. In November 1925, the Reich Centre for Promoting Small-Bore Shooting in Germany was established.

The gun-maker J. G. Anschütz, originally established in Mehlis in Thuringia in 1856, moved to Ulm in western Germany after the end of the Second World War. Its Match 54 action became established as the world's leading smallbore action in the 1960s, and remains popular among smallbore shooters worldwide.

=== International competition ===
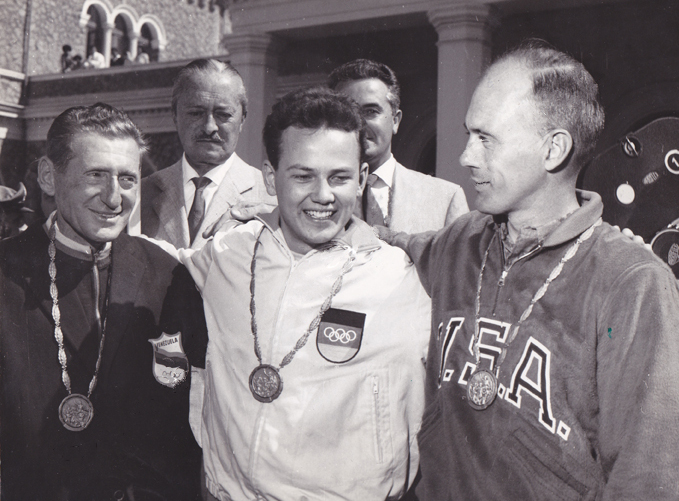
The three medallists in 50m men's prone rifle at the 1960 Summer Olympics: Enrico Forcella, Peter Kohnke and James Enoch Hill.

Shooting featured at first modern Olympic Games in Athens in 1896. The International Shooting Sport Federation (ISSF) was formed in the wake of the 1896 Olympics, and conducted its first world championship in 1897. However, the only ISSF rifle events were in fullbore shooting until the 1924 games, hosted by France, in which 50m rifle was added as a women's event.

The first smallbore events at the Olympic Games were contested in 1908. These games included smallbore shoots at disappearing and moving targets, which were not repeated. With the exception of 1928, smallbore shooting has featured in some capacity at every Olympics since. After 1924, smallbore dropped from the ISSF's roster until 1928, when 50m prone rifle was added to the games at Loosduinen as a test event; it remained for the 1929 games at Stockholm and has been contested ever since. The same year, the men's 50m three position rifle event was added, in which 40 shots were fired in each of the prone, kneeling and standing positions.

In 1947, the ISSF World Championships in Stockholm added an 'English Match' event, then consisting of 30 shots at 50 metres (55 yd) and 30 at 100 metres (110 yd). From the 1958 Moscow games, women were allowed to compete in this event, which was changed to 60 shots at 50 metres (55 yd) in 1962. From 1966, the ISSF world championships included women's events in both prone and three-position smallbore shooting, though women could also enter the other 'open' events. This changed from 1982, when the 'open' events were re-categorised as men's events. At the Olympic Games, prone and three-position smallbore shooting were made into mixed events between 1972 and 1980. In 1984, they reverted to men's events with a three-position smallbore shooting match for women. After the 2016 Olympics, the men's 50m prone event was removed, leaving only the men's and women's three-position events.

The ISSF's junior world championship was first contested in 1994. In 2004, the first FISU World University Shooting Championships were held. Smallbore shooting first featured at the Commonwealth Games in 1966, and continued at every games until 2018. In the Paralympic Games, smallbore shooting has featured since 1996, when smallbore events were added to the air rifle events that had existed since 1976.

== Equipment ==
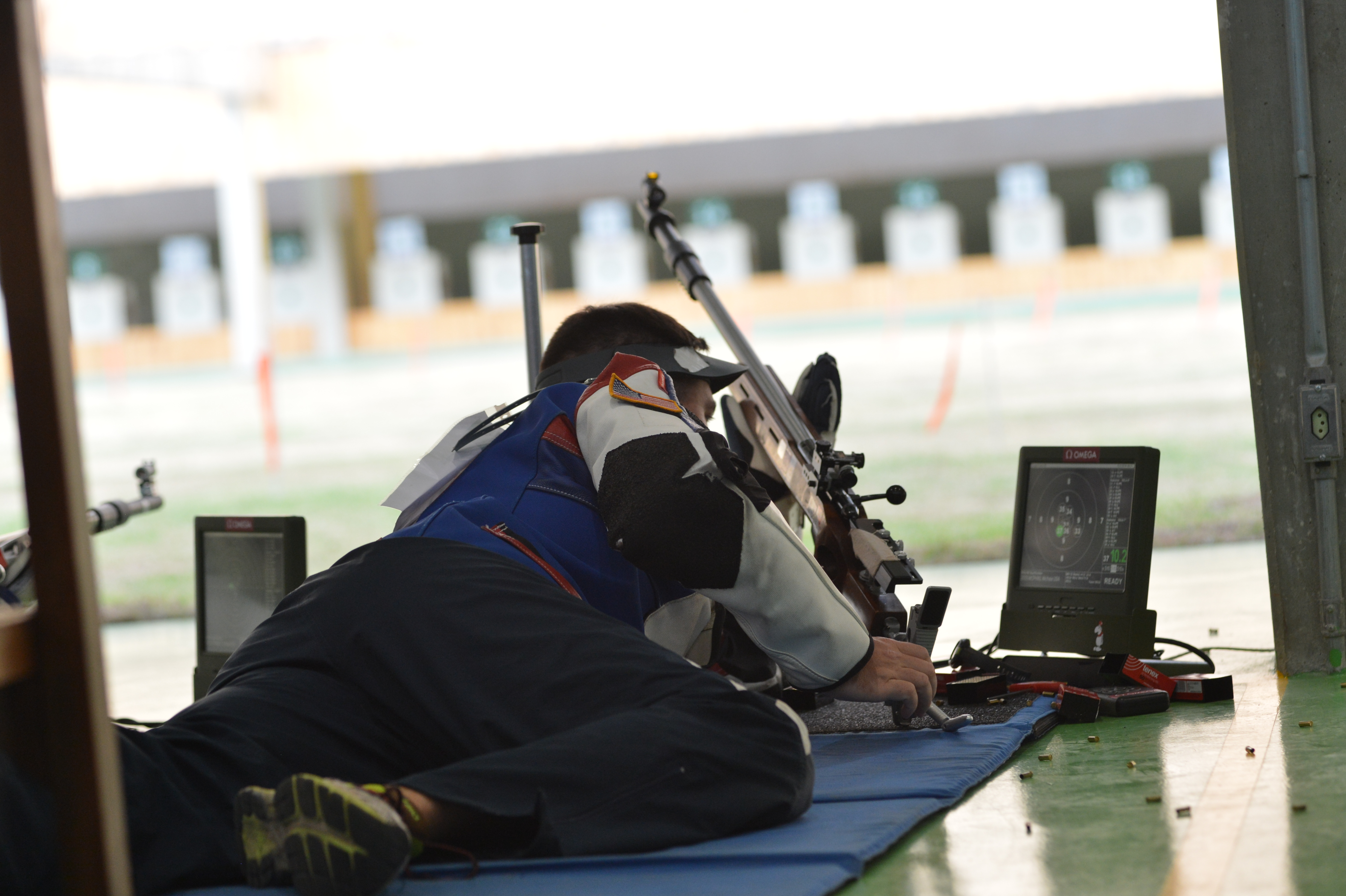
A shooter competing in the 50 metre prone rifle event at the 2016 Summer Olympics.

The rifles used for smallbore shooting are typically single-shot bolt action or lever-action rifles, chambered in .22 Long Rifle. Most competitive disciplines require competitors to use iron sights, though recreational shooters sometimes use optical or telescopic sights. Filters are sometimes fitted to the rear sight to reduce glare or increase the contrast between the target diagram and the background.

The rifle is supported with the aid of a stiff jacket, usually made of canvas or leather, with high-grip pads on the elbows and shoulder. A stiff glove is typically worn on the supporting hand. In the prone and kneeling positions, a sling is used to support the rifle, though the rifle generally rests on the hand and arm alone in the standing position.

In the standing position, a support is often used to allow the firer to rest the rifle between shots. Stiff trousers, in the same material as the shooting jacket, may be worn to increase the stability and consistency of the shooting position. In the kneeling position, a kneeling roll is placed beneath the shooter's back ankle to further support the position.

Rifles used in smallbore target shooting often have a pronounced curvature in the butt stock, to help the rifle keep its position in the shoulder. A butt-hook may be fitted to further support the rifle by hooking under the shooter's armpit.

Depending on the individual shooter, the discipline and the conditions, other shooting equipment can include a cap, a blinder for the shooter's non-dominant eye, a shooting mat and a telescope to allow the shooter to see and correct for the fall of their shots.

== Ranges ==
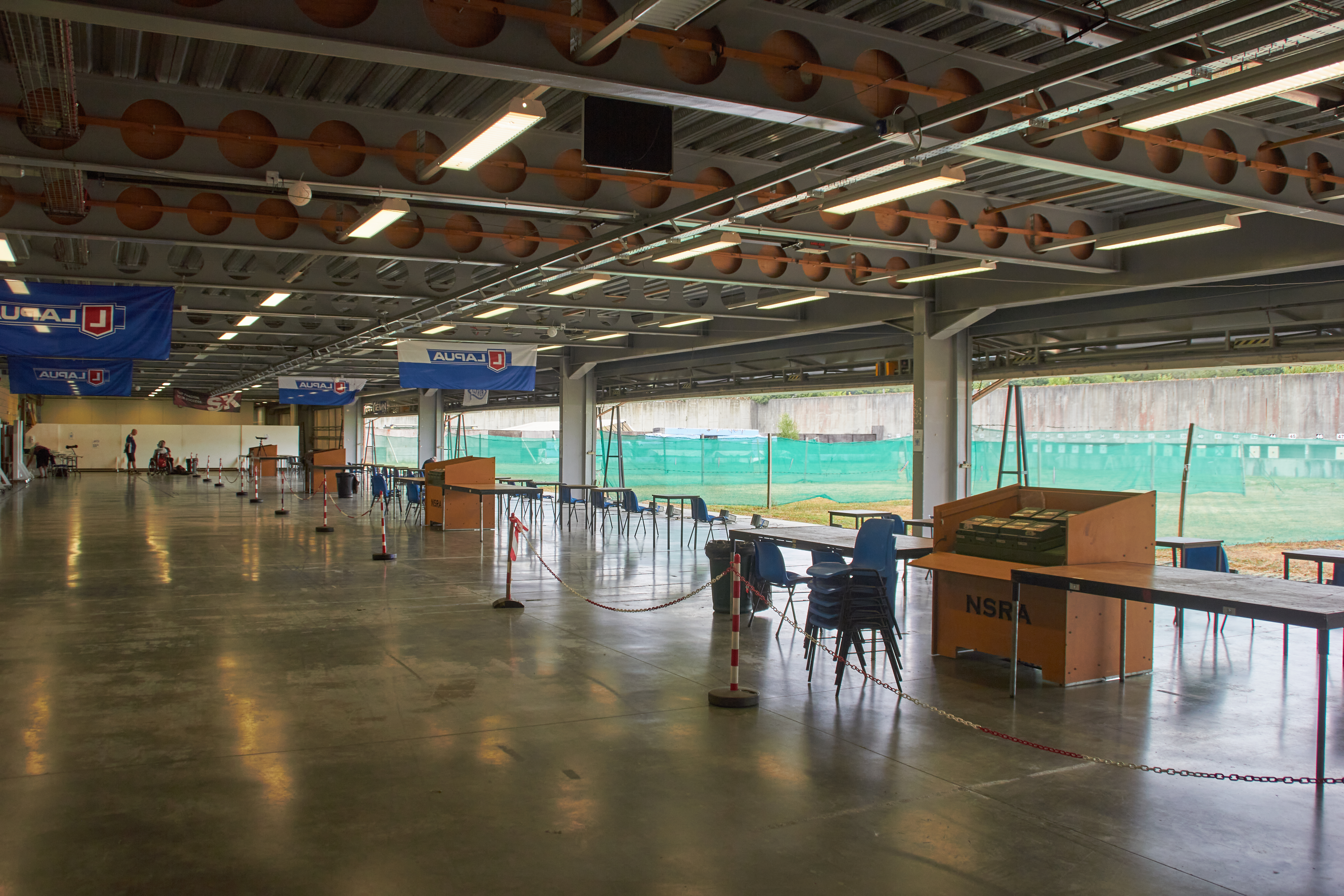
The Malcolm Cooper 50-metre range at the Lord Roberts Centre, Bisley, the home of the National Smallbore Rifle Association.

Smallbore shooting can be conducted either indoors or outside. Typically, shooting at ranges of 25 yards (23 m) and shorter is done indoors, while longer-range shooting at 100 yards (91 m) or more is almost invariably done outdoors. The British National Rifle Association administers a long-range smallbore match, shot at 200 and 300 yards (180 and 270 m).

Traditionally, paper or card targets are used, either with a single target diagram (most common in continental Europe) or multiple diagrams between which the shooter moves over the course of the shoot (most common in Great Britain). In modern times, electronic targets are increasingly common. Target sizes vary between countries: those used in the United States are typically slightly larger than those used in Great Britain, for example.

On outdoor ranges, wind flags are often provided to assist shooters in judging and adjusting for the effect of wind on the bullet.

== Positions ==
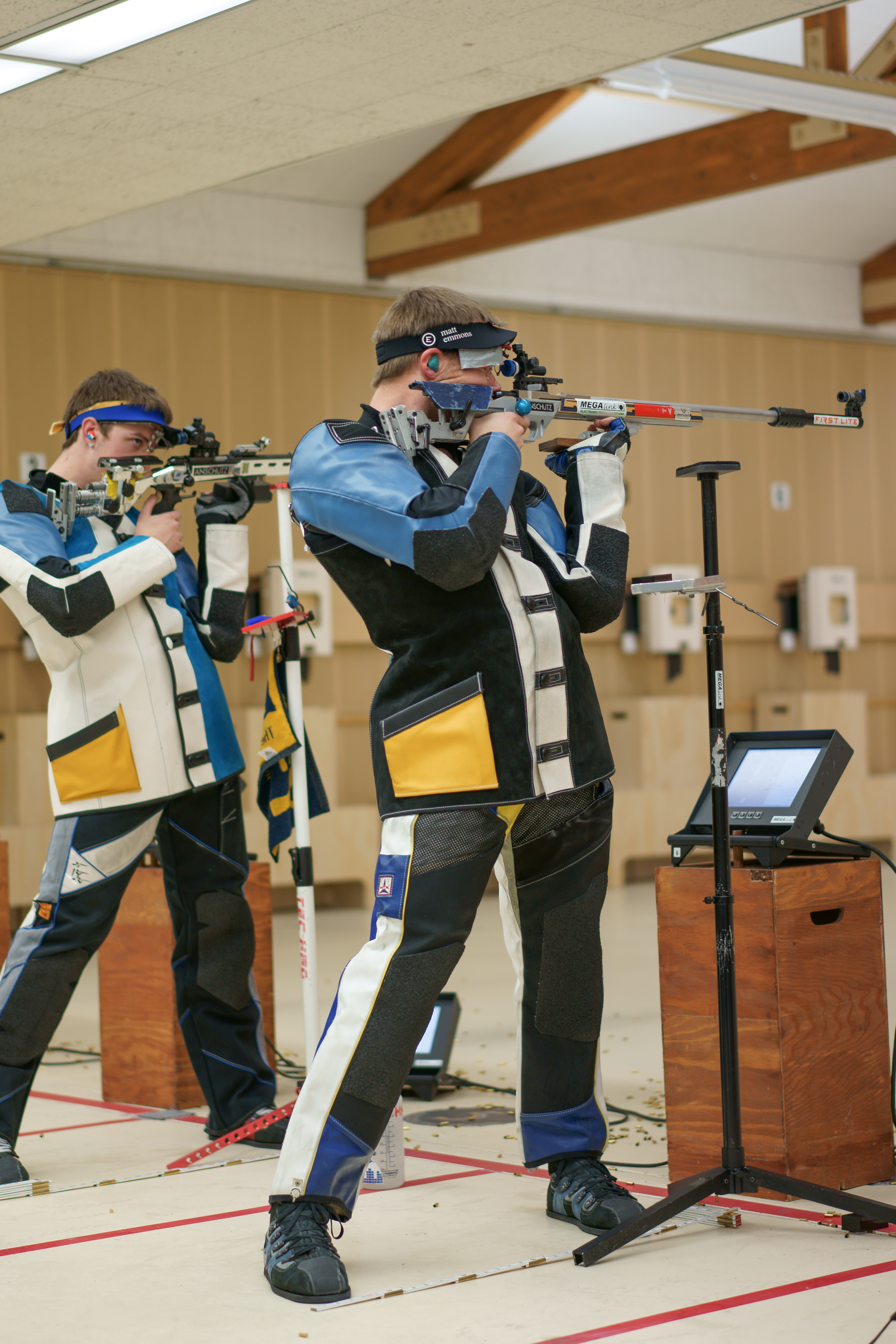
US Olympic shooter Matthew Emmons fires a smallbore rifle in the standing position.

Smallbore shooting is typically conducted in one of three positions: prone, kneeling and standing. It is also sometimes conducted, particularly by disabled shooters, in the benchrest or 'prone supported' position, in which shooters sit in a chair and rest their elbows on a bench or table at approximately chest height.

The International Shooting Sport Federation administers two smallbore disciplines: 50 metre rifle prone and 50 metre rifle three positions. ISSF rules govern the equipment and positions that can be used in international matches, which sometimes diverge from the national traditions or habits adopted in domestic competition.

== Competitions ==
In most competitions, shooters are divided into ability classes, either based on previous competition performance or declared average scores, and prizes are then awarded within each class. In the United Kingdom, this is generally the only division made within a competition, and all ages and genders compete together. In high-level competitions, all shooters compete in the same class.

Matches can be either shoulder-to-shoulder, in which the opposing shooters compete simultaneously on the same range, or postal. In a postal match, shooters may fire on different ranges at different times, sending their scores or shot cards for tabulation. Postal competitions may take place over numerous rounds, often fired in stages over weeks or months. In 1952, a match between Cambridge University and Harvard University, was conducted by telegram, each team shooting on their own range and sending the results to the other. More commonly, however, postal competitions are administered by sending the shot cards to a neutral scorer. It is usual practice for pre-allocated competition stickers to be affixed behind one of the target diagrams, to ensure that the shooter does not attempt to cheat by shooting multiple cards and afterwards selecting the best one.

Smallbore matches can be conducted according to various courses of fire. A common format is the 'English Match', consisting of sixty shots: in the modern era, this has generally been shot at 50 metres (55 yd) or 50 yards (46 m), though competitions before 1962 split the shots between 50 and 100 metres. Another common course of fire is the 'Dewar', which consists of twenty shots at each of 50 and 100 yards (46 and 91 m), sometimes increased to a 'Double Dewar' of forty shots at each. Less common is the 'Scottish Match', consisting of sixty shots at 100 yards (91 m).

=== International matches ===
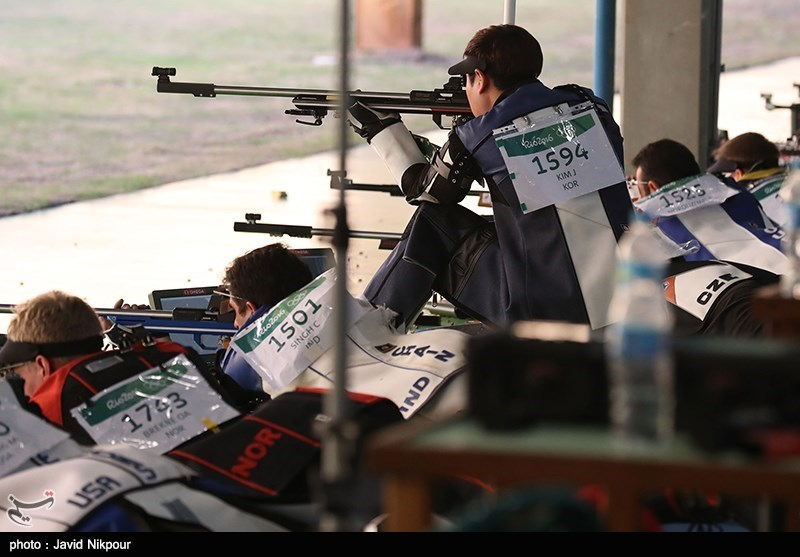
Shooters in the prone and kneeling positions during the men's 50 metre rifle three positions event at the 2016 Olympic Games

Major annual international team matches in smallbore shooting include:

- The Drew Match, an international match for shooters aged under twenty-one. Each nation enters three teams: a mixed team of ten, a men's team of three, and a women's team of three.
- The Dewar Trophy, considered the world's most prestigious postal match. The Dewar was inaugurated in 1908 as a challenge between the British Society of Miniature Rifle Clubs and the National Rifle Association of America, which developed into a three-way match between Great Britain, the United States and Australia. It is named for Thomas Dewar, who donated its trophy. From 1910, entry was opened to British colonies and dependencies, and it has since been contested at various times by Australia, Canada, Ceylon, India, New Zealand and South Africa.
- The Pershing and Roberts Matches, a shoulder-to-shoulder fixture between Great Britain and the United States. Each is normally contested every eight years, on a four-year offset: the Pershing at the National Rifle Association of America's National Matches, and the Roberts at Bisley at the NSRA's National Rifle Meeting. Both are shot to a 'Single Dewar' course of fire.
- The Randle Match, a women's match shot to a 'Single Dewar' course of fire. It is contested between teams of ten from Great Britain and the United States on American-sized targets.
- The Wakefield Match, shot to an 'English Match' course of fire at 50 m (55 yd). Begun in 1933 as a postal match between Great Britain and Sweden, the match went into abeyance in 1984, and was resurrected in 1991 as a fixture between Great Britain and various Anglosphere nations.

=== Olympic and other major championships ===
The 2016 Rio de Janeiro Summer Olympics included both 50m rifle three positions and 50m rifle prone, but only the three-position event was included for Tokyo 2020 and Paris 2024. As of the 2020 Summer Olympics, the competitive standard of the various smallbore disciplines is as follows:

Event	NSRA National Rifle Meeting		Olympics		Paralympics			World Championships				Former names
Event	Mixed	Mixed Team	Men	Women	Men	Women	Mixed	M	W	JM	JW	Former names
50 metre rifle three positions	✔		✔	✔			✔	✔	✔	✔	✔	Free rifle (men); Standard rifle/Sport rifle (women)
50 metre rifle prone	✔	✔	1912–2016		✔	✔		✔	✔	✔	✔	Free rifle (men); Standard rifle/Sport rifle (women)
100 yard rifle prone	✔	✔										

== Organisations ==
In the United Kingdom, smallbore shooting is governed by the National Smallbore Rifle Association, headquartered at the National Shooting Centre in Bisley, Surrey.

In the United States, smallbore shooting has been governed by USA Shooting since 1995.

== See also ==
- Fullbore target rifle
- International Shooting Sport Federation
- National Smallbore Rifle Association (United Kingdom)

== Bibliography ==
- Baker, Alex (2021-04-06). "Smallbore Prone Rifle International Matches". National Smallbore Rifle Association. Archived from the original on 2023-04-01.
- Barth, K.; Dreilich, B. (2010). Training Shooting Sports. Meyer and Meyer Series. Meyer & Meyer Sport. ISBN 978-1-84126-305-2.
- Bendix, Regina (1989). Backstage Domains: Playing "William Tell" in Two Swiss Communities. Bern: Peter Lang. ISBN 9783261039323.
- British Association for Shooting and Conservation (2020). "About Target Shooting". Archived from the original on 2023-03-25.
- "Rifle Team Beats Cambridge University in Decisive Meet". The Crimson. Harvard University. 1952-03-10. Archived from the original on 2023-03-24.
- Crossman, Jim (2021-11-18). "Early History Of The Smallbore Rifle Prone Match". Shooting Sports USA. National Rifle Association of America.
- Culture, Histoire et Patrimoine de Passy (2013). "L'enseignement du tir dans les écoles primaires de Passy" (in French).
- Emerson, William K. (2004). Marksmanship in the U.S. Army: A History of Medals, Shooting Programs, and Training. Norman: University of Oklahoma Press. ISBN 9780806135755.
- Henshaw, Thomas (1993). The History of Winchester Firearms 1866–1992. Winchester Press. ISBN 9780832905032.
- Historic Arms Research Centre (2020-05-09). "The Morris Tube". Rifleman.org.uk. Archived from the original on 14 September 2020.
- Humphry, A.P.; Fremantle, T.F. (1914). History of the National Rifle Association During Its First Fifty Years, 1859–1909. Bowes.
- Imhoof, David (2013). Becoming a Nazi Town: Culture and Politics in Göttingen Between the World Wars. Ann Arbor: University of Michigan Press. ISBN 9780472118991.
- International Olympic Committee (2015). "Shooting: History of Shooting at the Olympic Games" (PDF).
- International Shooting Sport Federation (2009-04-09). "Championships: World Championships". ISSF Sports. Archived from the original on 2023-04-01.
- Johnstone, Isobel (2011). "Targeting Equality: A Short History of the QRA's Lady Shooters". In Casey, Bill (ed.). Home on the Range: Queensland Rifle Association, 1861–2011. Brisbane: Boolarong Press. pp. 105–121. ISBN 9781921555800.
- Jones, Spencer (2014). "Shooting Power: A Study of the Effectiveness of Boer and British Rifle Fire, 1899 – 1914". British Journal for Military History. 1 (1): 29–47. Archived from the original on 2023-04-02.
- Maksimovic, Goran (2021). "Rifle Shooting: Shooting Positions" (PDF). International Shooting Sport Federation. Archived from the original (PDF) on 2023-04-01.
- National Rifle Association (2022). "Smallbore Long Range Match".
- National Small-bore Rifle Association (2023). "National Rifle Meeting". Archived from the original on 2023-04-01.
- National Small-bore Rifle Association (2017). "Brief History". National Small-bore Rifle Association. Archived from the original on 23 February 2017.
- National Small-bore Rifle Association (2014-01-24). "National Small-bore Rifle Association". Archived from the original on 2023-04-01.
- Palmer, A. Jerry (1978). The International Shooting Union: Official History 1907–1977. Wiesbaden: International Shooting Union.
- "Paris 2024 Olympic Competition Schedule – Shooting" (PDF). Paris 2024. 2022. pp. 67–69.
- Rocketto, Hap (2010a). "A History of the United States National Outdoor Smallbore Rifle Championships 1919-2010" (PDF). Archived from the original (PDF) on 2022-09-27.
- Rocketto, Hap (2010b). "A Short History of the Dewar International Postal Match" (PDF). Archived from the original (PDF) on 2021-11-14.
- Scott, Bruce (January 2020). Cotterill, Daniel (ed.). "Women Rifle Shooters – The Journey for Recognition and the North Queensland Influence" (PDF). Australian Target Rifle (144). National Rifle Association of Australia: 10–15. Archived from the original (PDF) on 9 March 2023.
- Shanklin Rifle and Pistol Club (2011-07-26). "History of Smallbore Rifle".
- "Shooting". Rio 2016. 2014. Archived from the original on 10 September 2014.
- Shooting Sports USA (2018-09-13). "A Brief History of Anschutz". Shooting Sports USA. National Rifle Association of America.
- Steele, David (2000). "Salisbury and the Soldiers". In Gooch, John (ed.). The Boer War: Direction, Experience and Image. London: Cass. pp. 3–20. ISBN 978-0-714-65101-9.
- Tokyo Organising Committee of the Olympic and Paralympic Games (25 July 2021). "Shooting – Competition Schedule" (PDF). Olympics.com. TOCOG. Archived from the original (PDF) on 1 August 2021.
- Tondu Target Shooting Club (2013). "Target Shooting in General". Archived from the original on 2022-08-11.
- Ward, Bill (2014). Walnut and Steel: Vintage .22 Rifles. Bloomington: AuthorHouse. ISBN 9781491863190.
- Waterman (2009). Feist, Paul (ed.). "Streetcars, Gas Lights, Black Powder: Winder Muskets Revisited and Maybe Some Other Stories Thrown In". The Redwood Stumper: The Newsletter of the Redwood Gun Club: 133–135.
