= National Rifle Association (United Kingdom) =

Sport governing body in the United Kingdom

Coordinates: 51.311°N 0.656°W

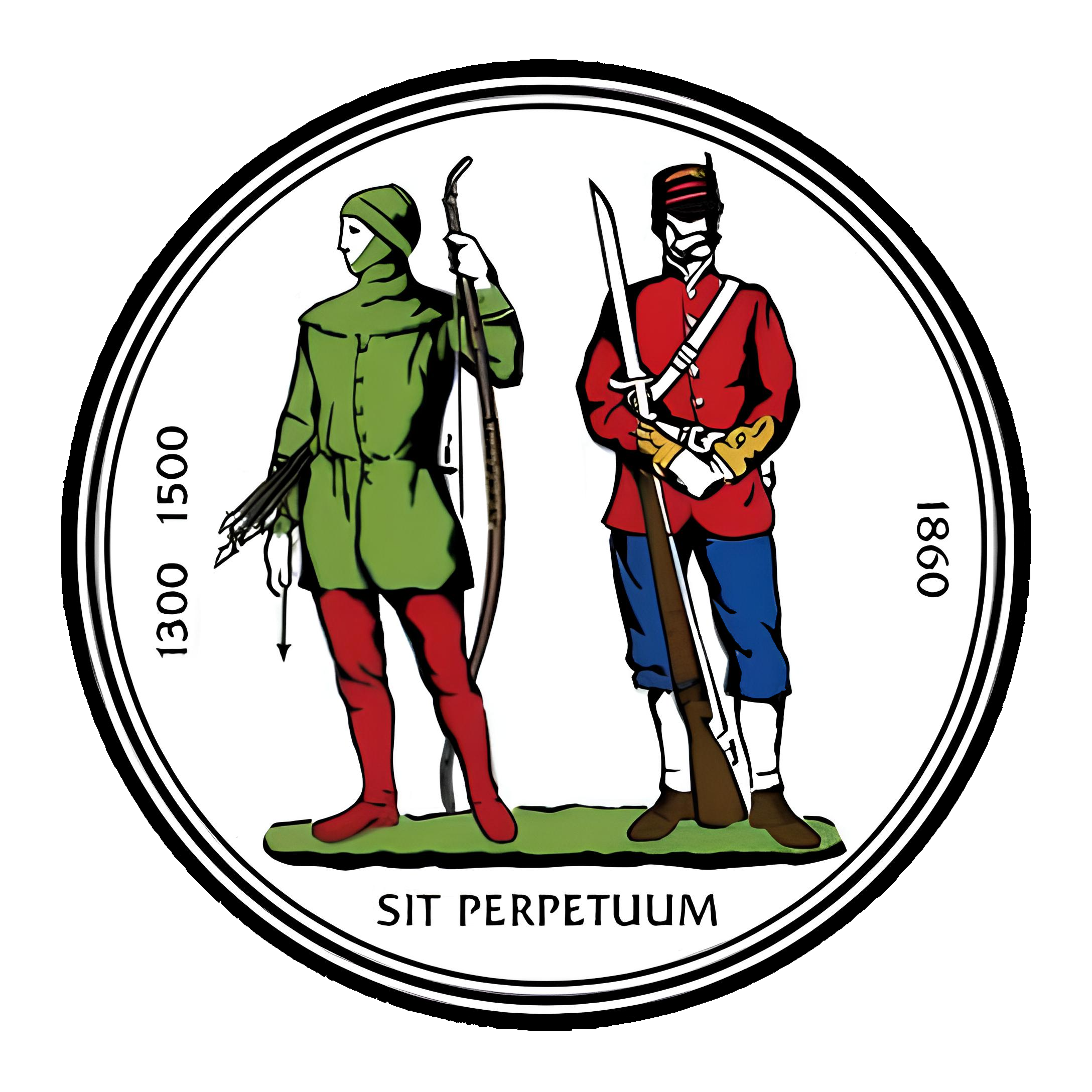
- Sport: Shooting
- Abbreviation: NRA
- Founded: 16 November 1859; 166 years ago
- Affiliation: ICFRA
- Headquarters: National Shooting Centre, Bisley
- Chairman: David Lacey
- CEO: Simon Lee MBE

Official website
- nra.org.uk
- (United Kingdom)

The National Rifle Association (NRA) is the national governing body for fullbore rifle and pistol shooting sports in the United Kingdom founded in 1859. Its main activities includes organising civilian target shooting and selecting British teams to contest the ICFRA World Championships. The National Shooting Centre (NSC) in Bisley, Surrey serves as its main training facility.

== History ==
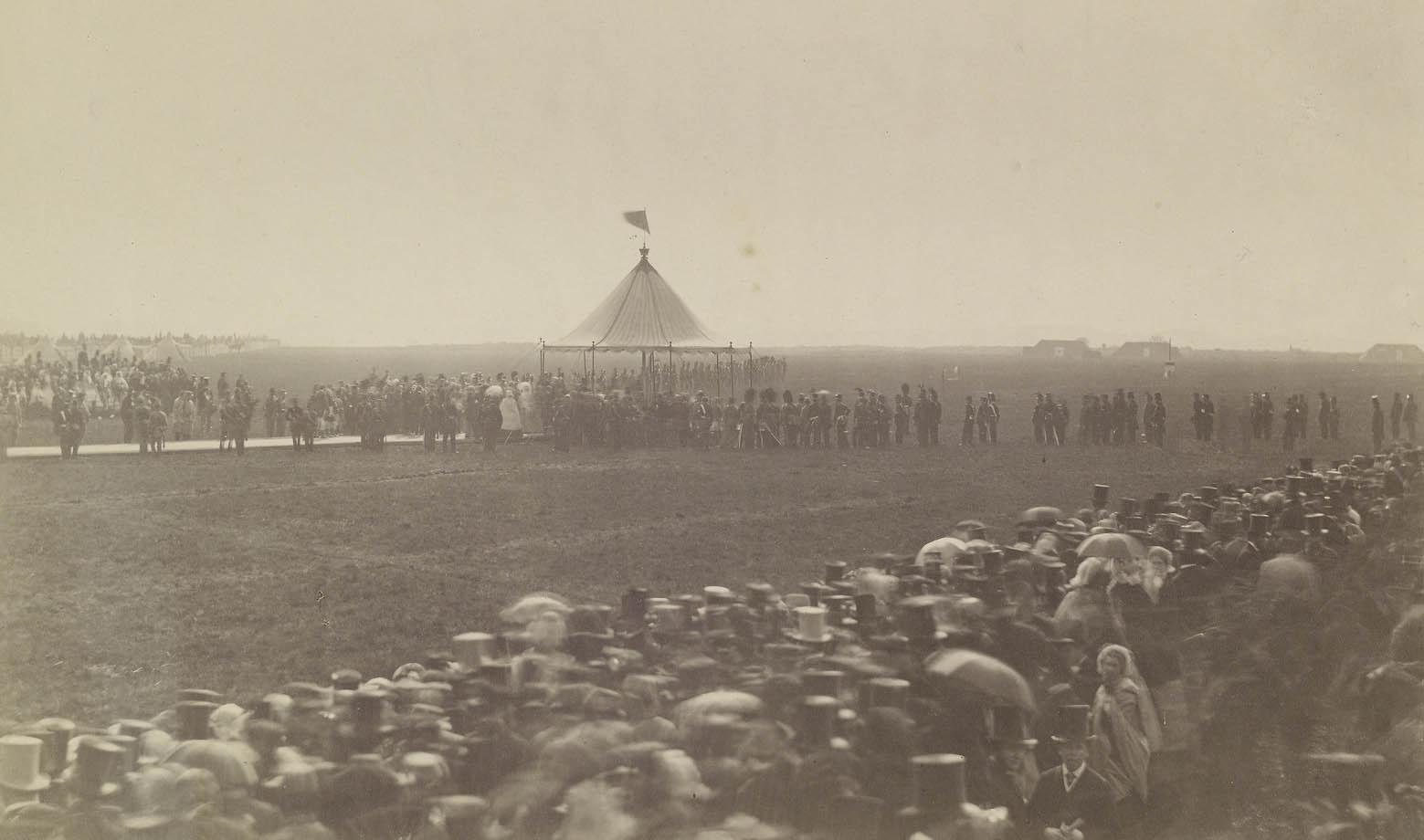
Queen Victoria firing the opening shot of the NRA's first Imperial Meeting on Wimbledon Common, July 1860

The National Rifle Association was founded in 1859. Registered as a United Kingdom charity, its objectives are to "promote and encourage marksmanship throughout the King’s dominions in the interest of defence and the permanence of the volunteer and auxiliary forces, naval, military and air." In pursuit of this, its founding aim was to raise the funds for an annual national rifle meeting (now known as the Imperial Meeting). The Association was originally based on Wimbledon Common, where the Imperial Meeting was held for its first 20 years.

In 1860, Queen Victoria fired the opening shot of the first Imperial Meeting. The Whitworth rifle used and the target can be seen in the Museum of the NRA at Bisley. The Queen also sponsored the Queen's Prize match with a £250 cash prize - worth around £38,000 at 2024 prices. The first winner was 17 year old Edward Ross of the 7th North Yorkshire Volunteers.

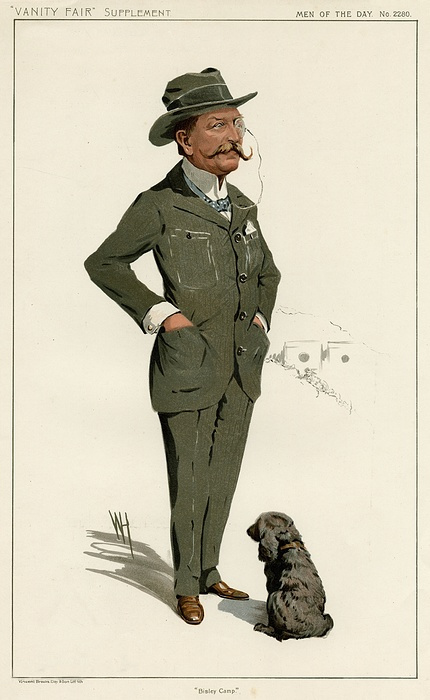
NRA Secretary Charles Robert Crosse, caricatured in Vanity Fair's "Men of the Day" series in 1912

The Imperial Meeting quickly gained significance in high society. In 1878 Edward Walford wrote "These annual gatherings are attended by the élite of fashion, and always include a large number of ladies, who generally evince the greatest interest in the target practice of the various competitors, whether it be for the honour of carrying off the Elcho Shield, the Queen's or the Prince of Wales's Prize, or the shield shot for by our great Public Schools, or the Annual Rifle Match between the Houses of Lords and Commons." Key matches such as the Elcho were significant social occasions on par with The Boat Race. Shooters and officials were often household names, and featured or even caricatured in society publications such as Vanity Fair.

The Association moved from Wimbledon to Bisley Camp in 1890 after encroaching housing development around Wimbledon caused concerns about the ongoing ability to safely operate the ranges. In the same year, Queen Victoria granted the National Rifle Association a royal charter of incorporation.

The NRA had a strong influence on the development of shooting sports around the world, particularly within the British Empire. The formation of the NRA of Australia in 1888 was prompted in part by the desire of regional associations to put together an Australian team to compete at Wimbledon.

As a skill-based sport, target shooting became open to women from an early point. Participation was in open competition alongside men rather than separate events, although in practice many clubs refused to accept female members. In 1891, Winifred Leale of the Guernsey Rifle Club became the first woman to compete in an NRA Competition. In 1930, Marjorie Foster became the first woman to win the Sovereign's Prize. A road on Bisley Camp is named in her honour. Female participation was not restricted to the UK - in Australia, the North Queensland Rifle Association is documented as holding ladies' competitions as early as May 1899 (although Australian women were controversially excluded when the Army took control of fullbore rifle clubs in 1903).

=== 1990s–present ===
Through the 1990s and 2000s, the NRA experienced falling membership and financial difficulties. Although the 2002 Commonwealth Games saw some capital investment to the Bisley facilities, other facilities including the accommodation and camping ablutions declined, with the NRA making significant redundancies in 2011 and 2012.

In 2006, the NRA founded the National Association of Target Shooting Sports (NATSS) working group in association with the National Small-bore Rifle Association and Clay Pigeon Shooting Association, to explore the practicalities and benefits of a merger between the bodies. The project was shelved in July 2009 following the withdrawal of the CPSA, followed by the NRA.

In 2013, new management within the NRA saw a wholesale change in approach to estate management and membership. Controversially, leases for clubhouses on Bisley Camp were increased significantly. One tenant fought a high profile battle in the media - having rejected the outcome of arbitration. This episode was misreported in national press as involving the "Regimental Clubhouse" of the Artists Rifles Regiment, but the Artists Rifle Club had in fact vacated the building in 1967 and had no connection with the new tenant.

As a result of lease controversies, Conservative MP Adam Holloway referred the NRA to the Charity Commission in 2019. The Commission had no concerns with the NRA's seeking market rates for rents and leases, but issued formal regulatory advice when it found the NRA had more generally acted outside its charitable objects by promoting civilian recreational shooting.

In 2020 the Charity Commission stated that the association had made progress and withdrew the decision in April 2022.

== The National Shooting Centre ==
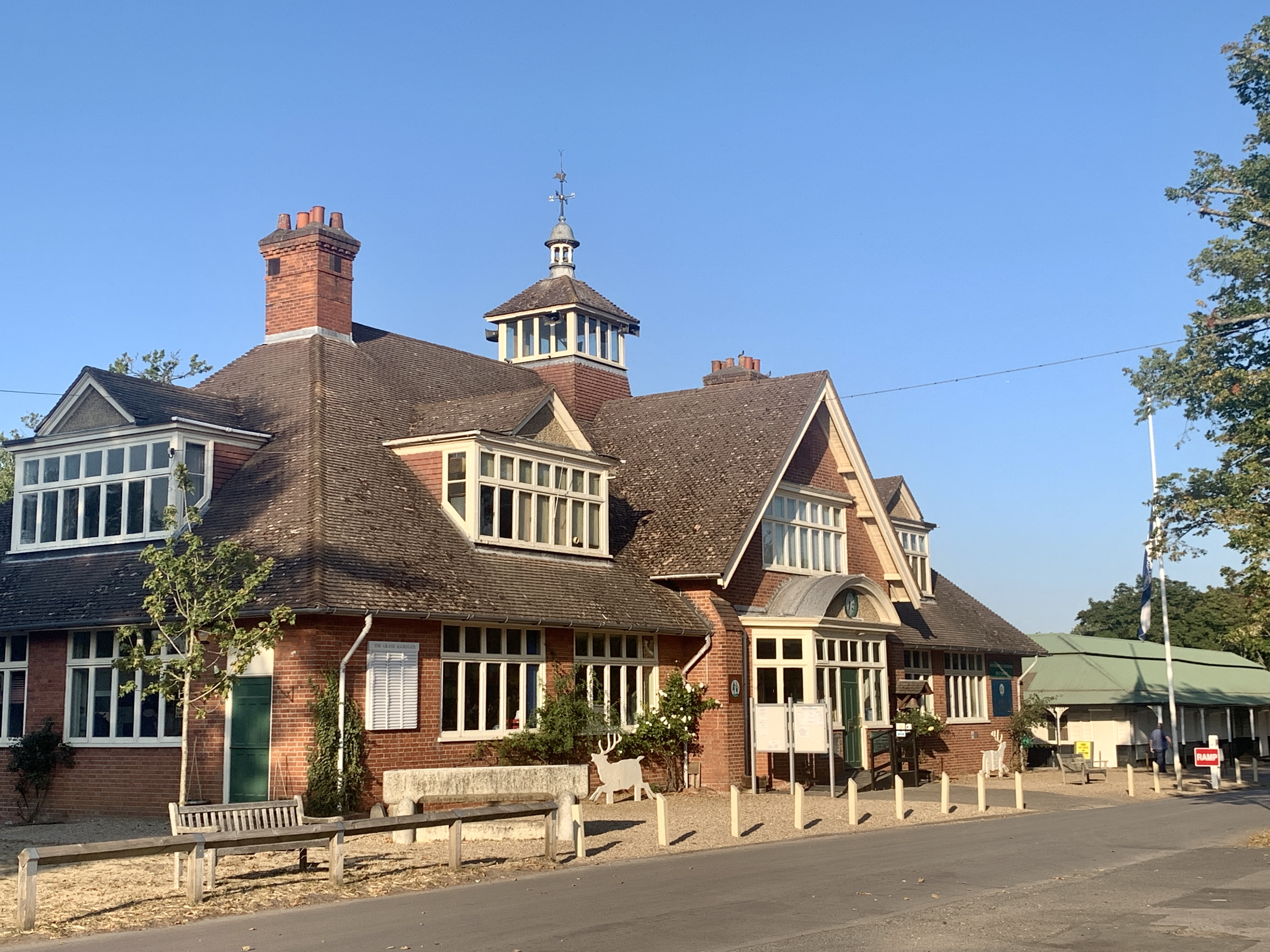
NRA Headquarters at the National Shooting Centre, Bisley Camp

The National Shooting Centre (NSC) is a wholly owned trading subsidiary of the National Rifle Association. Through the NSC, the Association owns the freehold on "Bisley Camp", which covers the built areas including Club Row, other buildings and clubhouses as well as the extensive caravan and camping sites. The Camp area also includes some smaller, self-contained ranges such as Cheylesmore. The larger ranges (Century, Stickledown and Short Siberia) are held on a 99-year lease from the Ministry of Defence. Although these are operated directly by the NSC and are not strictly military ranges, they do utilise the MoD Danger Area (which serves the adjacent Pirbright Camp military ranges). Consequently, they remain subject to some MoD rules for civilian use of military ranges.

The original ranges for the NRA's Imperial Meeting were at Wimbledon, but in the late 1880s the National Rifle Association began searching for a new site. In early 1888 it seemed that Cannock Chase was to be selected from several locations under consideration. However, that plan fell through a few months later, and the other potential venues again put their cases, with the Middlesex Chronicle newspaper suggesting that a large site at Staines was a likely home for "The New Wimbledon". Eventually though, Bisley was selected. The principal ranges used at Bisley today are as originally laid out in 1890 to accommodate modern full-bore rifle shooting.

== Museum of the National Rifle Association ==
The Museum of the NRA opened in 1997, some 90 years after it was first proposed. Located on the first floor of the NRA Headquarters on Bisley Camp, it occupies the former stats offices – which became available after the introduction of computers greatly reduced the desk and filing space required for collating competition results.

A working group of volunteers was formed in 1991. The decision was quickly taken to focus on Association history, rather than being a general firearms museum. As well as housing some of the Association's largest and most unwieldy trophies, the museum contains a reference library and picture gallery, along with exhibits of historic firearms, medals, memorabilia and shooting equipment. A further study-collection of historic rifles is maintained which are not on display but available to researchers.

== See also ==
- Army Operational Shooting Competition, the British Army's premier shooting competition, based at the National Shooting Centre, Bisley.
- British Shooting
- Firearms policy in the United Kingdom
- Gun safety
- List of shooting sports organizations
- National Smallbore Rifle Association, governing body for rimfire rifle and pistol shooting
- Wimbledon Cup, a marksmanship trophy first awarded in 1866 in Wimbledon, and subsequently each year by the NRA of America.
