= British Shooting =

Governing body

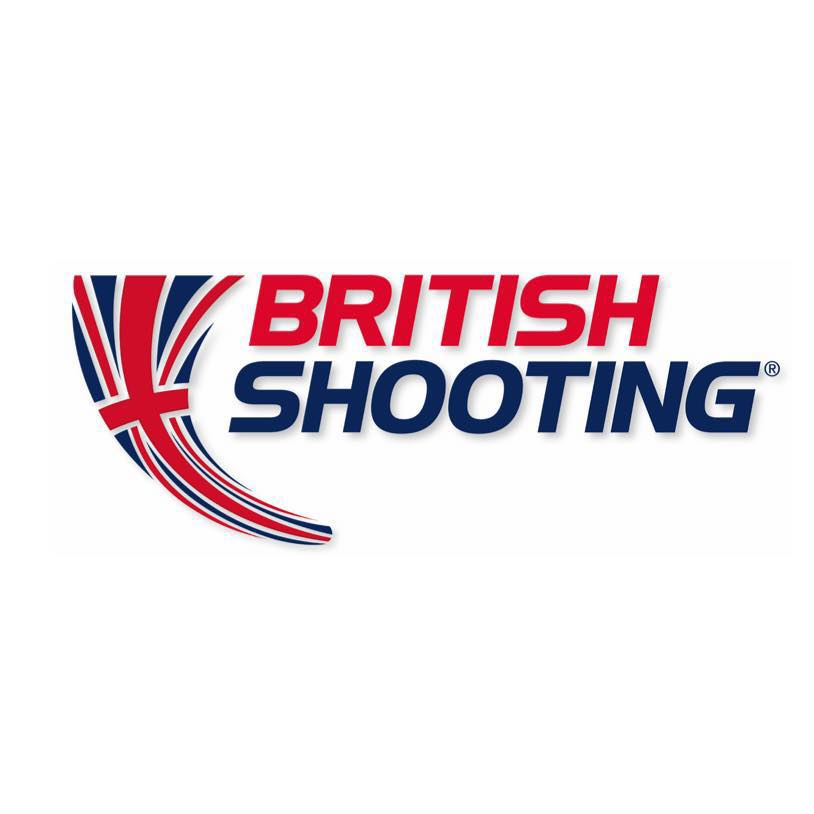
- Sport: ISSF Shooting Sports
- Jurisdiction: United Kingdom
- Abbreviation: BS
- Founded: 2007
- Affiliation: ISSF
- Regional affiliation: ESC
- Headquarters: Bisham Abbey, Berkshire
- Chairman: Guy North
- CEO: Hamish McInnes
- Replaced: GB Target Shooting Federation

Official website
- www.britishshooting.org.uk
- (United Kingdom)

British Shooting is the national governing body for ISSF shooting sport disciplines in the United Kingdom. The organisation serves as a single shooting body to receive public funding from UK Sport and Sport England, administer high performance squads and talent pathways as well as serve as the member body for shooting sports with organisations such as the British Olympic Association and ISSF.

== History ==
British Shooting replaced the GB Target Shooting Federation in 2007 as the single point of contact for organisations including the British Olympic Association, British Paralympic Association and ISSF. Unlike governing bodies for many other sports, BS is not a membership organisation and acts as an umbrella. This is necessary due to the fragmented governance of target shooting sports in the UK, with different disciplines managed by the CPSA, NRA and NSRA amongst others.

The organisation got off to a rocky start, underperforming at the 2008 Beijing Olympics and seeing their funding for the next four year cycle cut by 78%, reducing the number of supported athletes from forty-six to just five.

Since its inception, British Shooting has also absorbed responsibility from the English Target Shooting Federation for administering grass-roots funding from Sport England. It has launched a national Target Sprint series, Schools Championship as well as a national airgun series. In 2023 the organisation launched a 50M Rifle Series, held at the NSRA's Aldersley centre in the West Midlands.

At the instigation of Ruth Mwandumba, in 2022 British Shooting launched the #TargetChange campaign with the Women's Sport Alliance and Eley. The project ran "have-a-go" days around the UK to change the perceptions of target shooting sports and encourage participation from more diverse communities.

== World Class Performance ==
Since 2007, British Shooting's performance programmes have produced a number of World and European Champions in Rifle and Shotgun.

At the 2012 London Olympics, Peter Wilson won a Gold medal in the Men's Double Trap.

At the 2016 Olympic Games, British Shooting delivered two Bronze medals for Team GB - Edward Ling in the Men's Trap and Steven Scott in the Men's Double Trap.

In 2018 Seonaid McIntosh became Britain's first female World Champion in a rifle event when she won the Women's 50metre Prone Rifle at the ISSF World Championship in Changwon. In 2019 Seonaid went on to be the first female rifle shooter from Britain to win a Gold Medal at an ISSF World Cup event. She won three World Cup medals in 2019 as well as winning the World Cup Final event in 50m Three Position Rifle, making her the most successful GB female rifle shooter of all time.

At the 2020 Olympics, Matthew Coward-Holley won Team GB's only shooting medal in the Men's Trap.

At the 2022 European Shotgun Championships, Lucy Hall won Silver in the Women's Trap, which earned a quota place to the 2026 Olympic Games.

At the 2022 World Shotgun Championships, Sophie Herrmann became the first GB Junior Woman to become world champion, with Mitchell Brooker-Smith winning silver in the Junior Men's Skeet. The pair won the Junior Mixed Skeet Pairs event. The Senior Men's team of Nathan Hales, Matthew Coward-Holley and Aaron Heading won Team Trap Gold. Hales won Silver in the Individual Men's Trap (earning an Olympic quota place) and Silver in the Mixed Pairs Trap with Lucy Charlotte Hall.

== See also ==
- Clay Pigeon Shooting Association
- National Rifle Association
- National Smallbore Rifle Association
