= National Small-bore Rifle Association =

- Abbreviation: NSRA
- Predecessor: Society of Working Mens Rifle Clubs (1901–1903); Society of Miniature Rifle Clubs (1903–1947)
- Formation: 1901
- Founder: Major General Charles Edward Luard
- Merger of: The British Rifle League (1903)
- Type: National Governing Body
- Registration no.: 76008
- Legal status: Company Limited by Guarantee
- Headquarters: National Shooting Centre, Bisley, Surrey, England
- Region served: United Kingdom
- Members: ~3,000
- Patron: Charles III
- CEO: Tessa Shorey
- Chairman: Mike Arnstein
- Main organ: On Target
- Subsidiaries: NSRA Ltd
- Affiliations: British Shooting Sports Council; British Shooting
- Website: www.nsra.co.uk

The National Small-bore Rifle Association (NSRA) is the national governing body for all small-bore rifle and pistol target shooting in the United Kingdom, including airgun and match crossbow shooting.

The NSRA is based at the Lord Roberts Centre, within the grounds of the National Shooting Centre at Bisley in Surrey. National postal competitions are organised all year round, together with a series of meetings, culminating in the Bisley Rifle Meeting, or National Meeting in August, preceded by the Scottish Rifle Meeting in June/July.

== History ==
=== Formation ===
The NSRA was originally formed in 1901 as the Society of Working Mens Rifle Clubs. A series of heavy defeats during 1899 in the Second Boer War had demonstrated a lack of marksmanship ability amongst British military-age men, whilst the Boers had been able to pick off British officers at ranges in excess of 1,000yards. Although the National Rifle Association had been founded in 1859, ranges suitable for large-calibre service rifles were necessarily rural and costly to travel to. Cost of ammunition for civilians was also a limitation. With the adoption of the sub-calibre Morris aiming tube in 1883 and development of the .22 Long Rifle cartridge in 1887 it became apparent that principles of marksmanship could be taught and trained using these small calibre "miniature" rifles on local or even indoor ranges located in towns and cities.

Major General Charles Edward Luard was at the forefront of this line of thinking and pressured the British Government to sponsor such a movement from 1899 until 23 March 1901 when a meeting of MPs, city Mayors and dignitaries representing many Working Men's Clubs, passed a resolution founding the society.

“That the foundation of THE SOCIETY OF WORKING MEN’S RIFLE CLUBS, for facilitating rifle shooting, more especially in the evening, with small-bore rifles and inexpensive ammunition, as an ordinary branch of recreation by working men’s and working boys’ clubs and institutes, be now proceeded with”

— Founding Resolution of the SWMRC, 23rd March 1901

The organisation was founded on the premise of being funded primarily by gentlemen, with the working classes expected to join the clubs and avail themselves of this opportunity. In many ways this was a spiritual update on the ancient English law requiring all men and boys to practice archery, facilitated by the local clergy and gentry. Notable champions of this movement included Arthur Conan Doyle, who constructed a 100yard range at his Undershaw home and founded a rifle club there, providing shooting for local men. As a champion of such clubs, Conan Doyle sat on the Rifle Clubs Committee of the National Rifle Association. Many modern rifle clubs still benefit from this legacy, having inherited the grounds and quarries that land owners made available to these new Miniature Rifle Clubs.

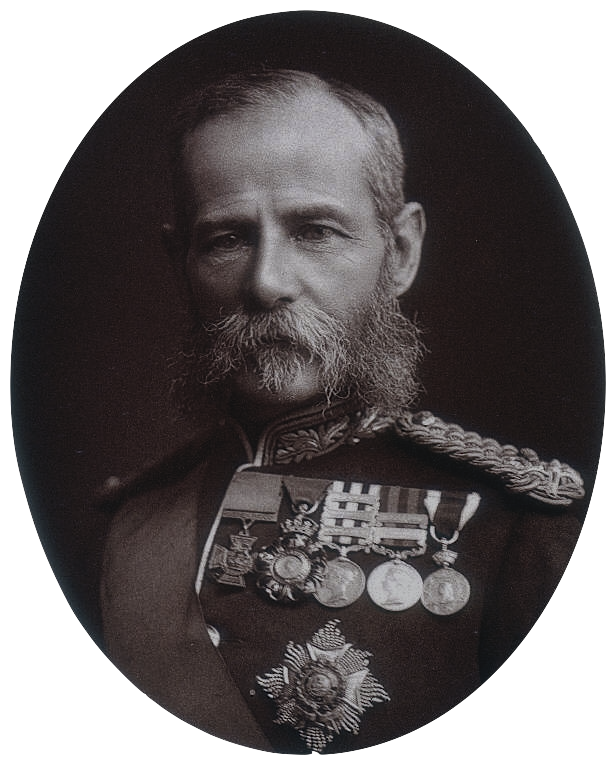
Earl Roberts - the SWMRC's first President

Luard took the Chair of the SWMRC's Executive Committee, with Earl Roberts of Kandahar acting as President and affording the group enormous publicity through his celebrity status as a celebrated Field Marshal. The 15th Duke of Norfolk was appointed as Chair of the non-executive Council.

In 1902 with around 80 affiliated clubs, the Society of Working Mens Rifle Clubs entered into co-operation with The British Rifle League - an organisation with similar aims operated by popular magazine "The Regiment". In collaboration they held their first shooting match and the first "Miniature Bisley" was held at The Crystal Palace in March 1903. This was considered a small-bore version of the NRA's Imperial Meeting - by then moved from Wimbledon Common to Bisley Camp in Surrey.

The two organisations merged later in 1903 becoming the Society of Miniature Rifle Clubs (SMRC), a name it held until 1947 when it renamed itself the National Small-bore Rifle Association (NSRA).

In 1904 Earl Roberts retired from active military service and devoted himself to the newly merged SMRC, driving a major fundraising campaign and seeking to found a club in every town. In 1906 he successfully gained recognition from the Army Council, putting the SMRC on an equal footing with the NRA and exempting members of affiliated clubs from the Gun Licence Duty, which was the considerable sum of 10 Shillings. The exemption from this cost enabled a new wave of clubs, resulting in the training of tens of thousands of men by the outbreak of the First World War.

The First World War saw a downturn in fortunes for the SMRC. In 1914, Earl Roberts died aged 82, having developed pneumonia whilst visiting troops in France. The presidency remained vacant until 1917 when Field Marshal Earl Haig was appointed as president. By the end of the war the number of affiliated clubs had fallen dramatically to around 1,500 as many club members had either lost their lives or were no longer inclined to shoot after the horrors of the trenches. The Firearms Act 1920 - enacted in fear of growing socialism and the shadow of the Russian Revolution - further constrained the ability of clubs to operate.

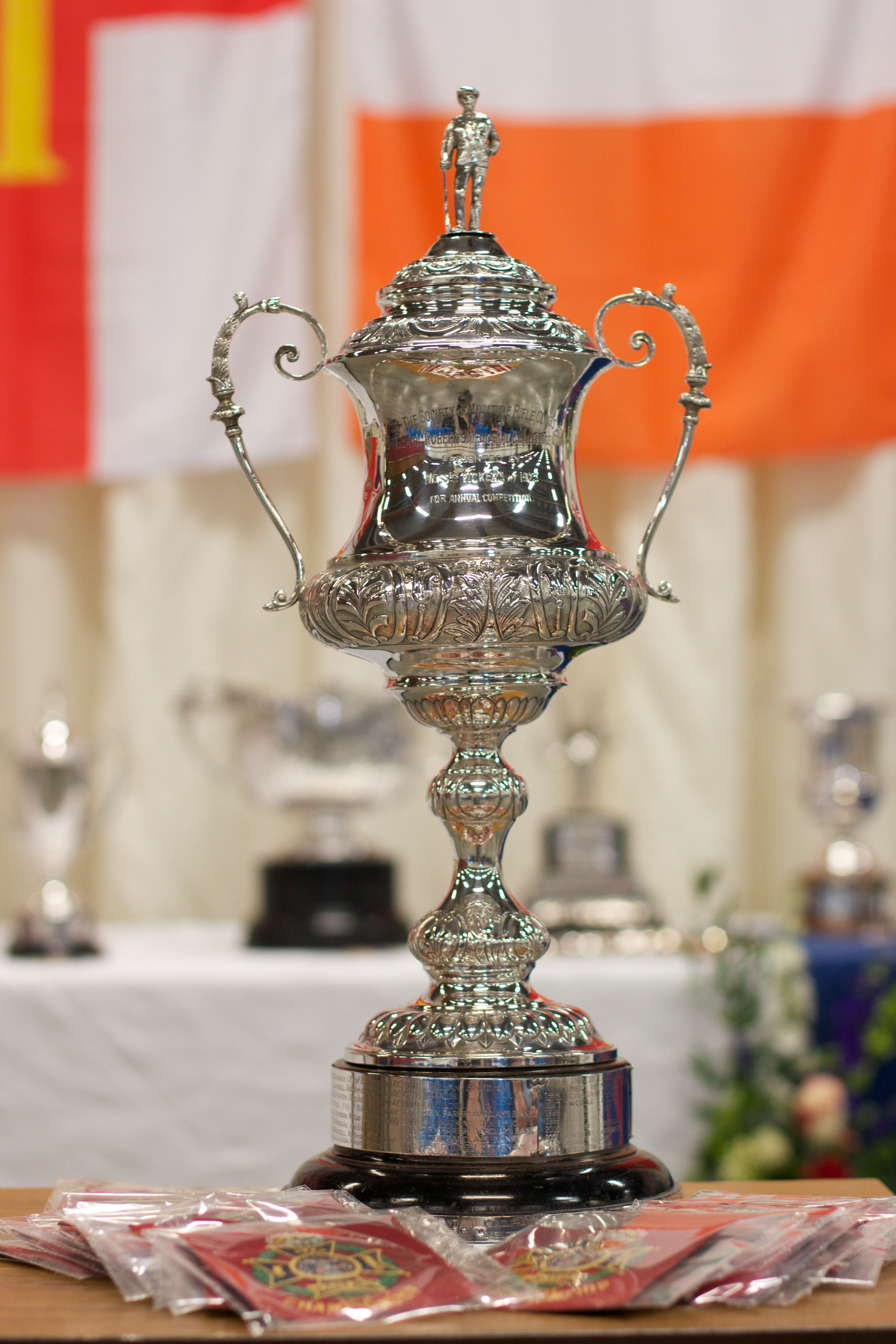
Earl Roberts Memorial Challenge Cup

The Earl Roberts Memorial Challenge Cup was gifted to the association by Vickers in 1923 to be awarded to the "Champion Small-bore Rifleman of the year". The annual competition continues to be held at the association's National Small-bore Rifle Meeting at Bisley.

=== World War 2 ===
The society worked to reverse this trend, upsizing through several London bases and having 2374 affiliated clubs by 1939. The Second World War saw a growth in clubs. Just as many original clubs from 1902 had grown from volunteer militia groups, so new clubs formed around the Home Guard Units in areas where no clubs existed already. SMRC affiliations grew to 4019 clubs by the end of 1945. The War Office continued to support these clubs despite having stood down the Home Guard in 1944. The war also saw the society move after their London Headquarters was destroyed in May 1941, resulting in the loss of the society's records as well as the destruction of 48 valuable trophies. Their printers were also hit that night, destroying their stock of targets, as were the offices of the society's solicitors and auditors. Nonetheless, they were fully operational just three months later from new headquarters in the relative safety of Richmond, Surrey.

=== Post-War ===
During the Second World War, the society suspended all airgun events to focus solely on cartridge shooting. Post-war the association showed little interest in redeveloping it. This gap was filled by the emergence of the Air Rifle Clubs Association (ARCA) in the 1960s. This led to a split where the NSRA was the recognised authority for international small-bore and airgun shooting despite ARCA being the de facto domestic authority on airgun shooting. This changed with the recognition of ARCA by the Central Council for Physical Recreation following an intervention by CCPR chairman the Duke of Edinburgh. CCPR recognition led to a rebrand from ARCA to the National Air Rifle and Pistol Association (NARPA). NARPA organised a National Airgun Championship, initially at Rushden, Northamptonshire, and later at RAF Cosford in Shropshire. Under pressure from this new organisation the NSRA launched their own British Air Gun Championships in 1974 with the inaugural meeting held at the National Sports Centre for Wales, in Sophia Gardens, Cardiff, and remaining there until 1990 when it was held in Manchester ahead of the 1991 European Air Gun Championships which were held in the same Manchester venue. In 1980 NARPA closed, with the NSRA absorbing their responsibilities.

Over the decades, various attempts were made to establish a National Range for the hosting of Small-bore Meetings. In 1977 a demountable range was developed that could be erected annually on Bisley's Century Range, and the society (now renamed the NSRA) made the decision to leave London for the last time, setting up base in 1980 on Bisley Camp which was rapidly being developed as a National Shooting Centre.

In 1991, the purpose-built National Indoor Shooting Centre was opened at Aldersley Leisure Village near Wolverhampton. The centre was located adjacent to a 100yard small-bore range operated by Wolverhampton Smallbore Rifle Association and hosted local clubs but also provided a more central location for the British Air Gun Championships, which were held there between 1992 and 2001, moving to Bisley in 2002 following the opening of the Lord Roberts Centre. Opening in 2001, the LRC was a state-of-the-art small-bore and airgun range complex constructed for the 2002 Commonwealth Games, featuring an Olympic-grade Sius Ascor electronic scoring system and office space for the NSRA. The NSRA offices moved from "Lord Roberts House", a building just inside the entrance to Bisley Camp. This office was sold to the Clay Pigeon Shooting Association, who moved to the camp from leased premises in Corby and renamed the building "Edmonton House".

In 2006, the NSRA founded the National Association of Target Shooting Sports working group in association with the National Rifle Association and Clay Pigeon Shooting Association, to explore the practicalities and benefits of a merger between the bodies. The project was shelved in July 2009 following the withdrawal of the CPSA, followed by the NRA.

The Association crest used from 1952-2024, when it was updated following confirmation of Charles III's patronage.

In May 2024, the Association's patronage by Charles III was confirmed, continuing the patronages of Elizabeth II (since 1952) and George VI (since 1942). The Association's logo was updated to represent the Tudor Crown used since 2022 in royal heraldry, replacing the St Edward's Crown used during the reign of Elizabeth II.

=== Construction of the Lord Roberts Centre ===
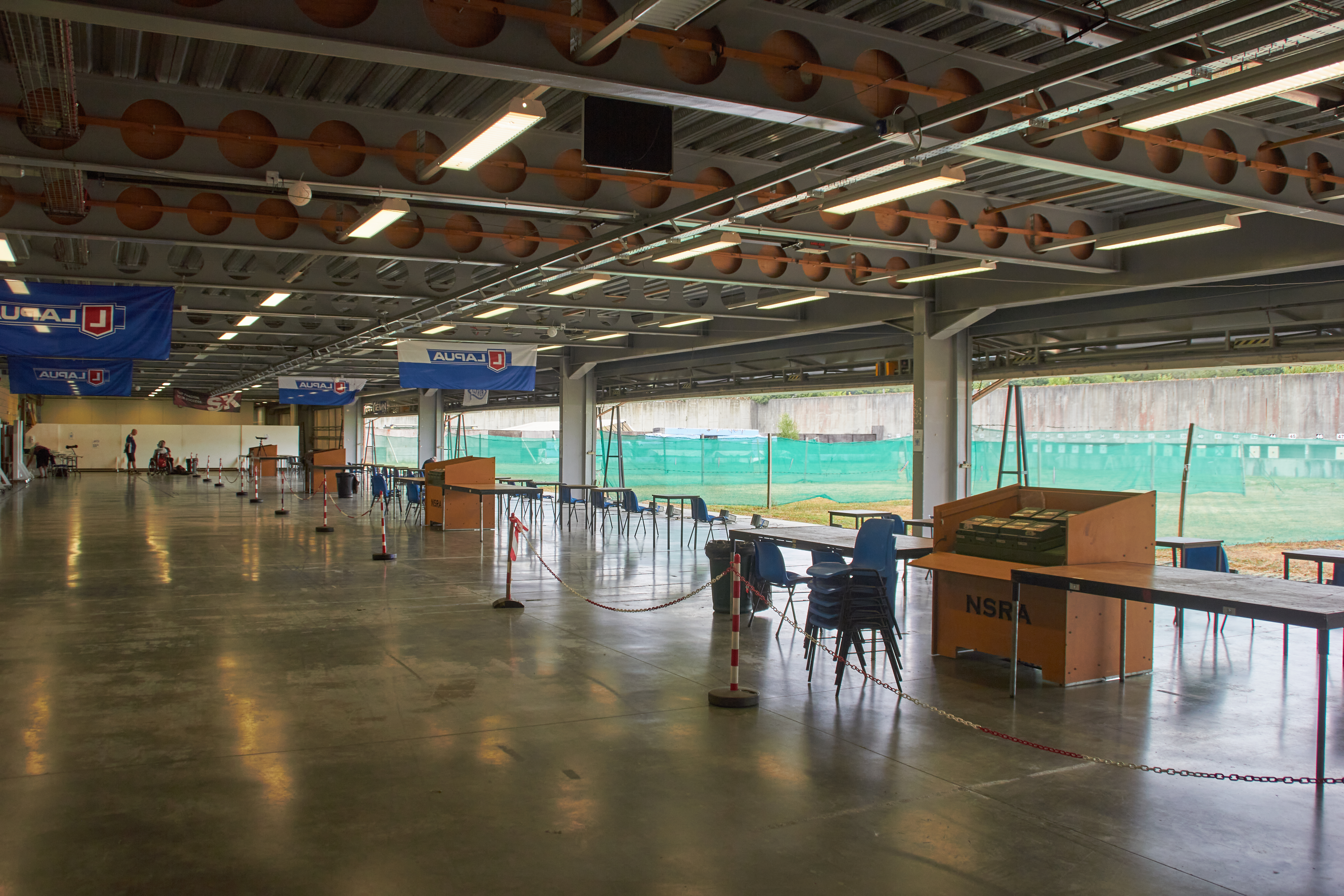
The Malcolm Cooper 50Metre Range in the Lord Roberts Centre

The Lord Roberts Centre was a controversial building from its inception. Oriented North-East rather than due North, early morning shooters on the outdoor ranges were blinded by the sun rising over the targets. This was compounded by the decision not to include cross-range baffles, which are a common feature on similar range complexes in Europe. The first floor - where the airgun range was located - was criticised for using a sprung construction which produced noticeable bounce on the firing point. Despite this, Niccolò Campriani scored a 599 and a perfect 600 score at the British Airgun Championships in 2013. Most notable however was the financial strain that this large facility placed on the NSRA, which had no organisational experience operating a dedicated range complex. With the prohibition on both centrefire and small-bore pistols in 1997, visitor numbers from air gun and rifle shooters to the centre were insufficient to cover the operating costs, resulting in the association's commercial subsidiary seeking other sources of income, including wedding receptions and a long-term deal that saw the upstairs hall configured as a roller-hockey rink.

== International Competition ==
Selection for ISSF smallbore competitions such as the World Championships is now managed by British Shooting. The NSRA continues to compete in a number of historic rifle matches, predominantly against the United States and Commonwealth nations such as Canada and South Africa. These are marked from the ISSF events by mostly being fired at both 50metres and 100yards.

=== International Post Match ("The Dewar Match") ===
In 1908, the Society of Miniature Rifle Clubs issued a challenge to the NRA of America for an indoor team match featuring 500-person teams firing at 25yards. This was negotiated down to teams of 50 and the first match took place in 1909, with Sir Thomas Dewar donating the International Post Match Trophy. Through Arthur Hill, Australia also participated, making the event a triangular match. Competing by post allowed an annual match to take place without the expense of international travel. Britain won the first match, with the United States winning in 1910. The United States won the 1914 match and retained the trophy through the first world war when no contest was held. In 1919 the SMRC reinstated the event as an outdoor match with teams of 20 firing 20 shots at each of 50 yards (now metres) and 100 yards. The British team typically hold trials and shoot at Appleton Rifle Club in Cheshire. The US team typically shoot at the US National Matches at Camp Perry, or, more recently, Camp Atterbury-Muscatatuck. Contested initially by Great Britain and the United States, Australia won in 1972 and South Africa in 1998.

=== Randle Match ===
Similar to the Dewar Match, the Randle is an annual international postal for ladies teams of 10. First contested in 1952, it has been won by the United States or Great Britain every year except 1997 when South Africa won.

In a Pershing or Roberts Match year, a shoulder-to-shoulder "Goodwill Randle" match is also held between the hosts and visitors.

=== Pershing Trophy International Team Match ===
The Pershing Trophy was presented to the National Rifle Association of America by General John J. Pershing in 1931 for use in a shoulder-to-shoulder international smallbore rifle competition. The 1931 match was won by Great Britain. The match was initially held at uneven intervals, determined by attendance of a visiting team. In 1969 it was agreed to set the interval at eight years, interspersed with a return match by the US to Bisley, resulting in a team travelling once every four years. When in Britain, teams compete for the Earl Roberts Trophy, with the event known as the Roberts Match.

America has won 11 of the 13 Pershing matches (Britain won the first two) and 5 of the 7 Roberts Matches.

Pershing Match Results
Year	Winner	US Score	GB Score
1931	Great Britain	3925	3927
1937	Great Britain	3959	3961
1939	United States	3950	3931
1953	United States	3990	
1961	United States	3970-239X	
1965	United States	3945-194X	3929-180X
1973	United States	3996-313X	
1981	United States	3995-331X	3992
1989	United States	4000-301X	3995-310X
1997	United States	3990-289X	3987-273X
2005	United States	3990-295X	3990-270X
2013	United States	3998-339X	3987-298X
2021*	United States	3990-293X	3988-287X

- The 13th match was held in 2022 at Camp Atterbury-Muscatatuck, Indiana. The match was postponed from 2021 due to travel restrictions.

=== The Field Marshal Lord Roberts Trophy Match ===
The Roberts Trophy is contested in the United Kingdom against a visiting American team once every eight years, on a four-year offset from the opposing Pershing match in the US. The trophy was first contested in 1969. As of the 2025 match, Britain has won 3 of the 8 encounters.

Roberts Match results
Year	Winner	US score	GB score
1969	United States	3851	
1977	United States	3926	
1985	United States	3825	
1993	Great Britain		3812
2001	United States	3852	3851
2009	Great Britain		3842
2017	United States	3838	
2025	Great Britain	3821	3863

== Bisley rifle meeting ==
The first meeting was held in 1922 and has been held annually with the exception of the war years and 2020-21 when it was cancelled due to COVID-19.

The meeting is normally held at the National Shooting Centre for a week starting on the third Saturday before August Bank Holiday Monday. Most competitions are shot on about 200 firing points sited on the 200-yard firing point of Century Range. Shooting is predominantly at 50metres and 100yards, with the exception of the Queen Alexandra Cup which includes a 25yard component. Three-Position events and the Double English match are fired at the Lord Roberts Centre on electronic targets broadly under ISSF Rules. The entry for the meeting is about 900 competitors.

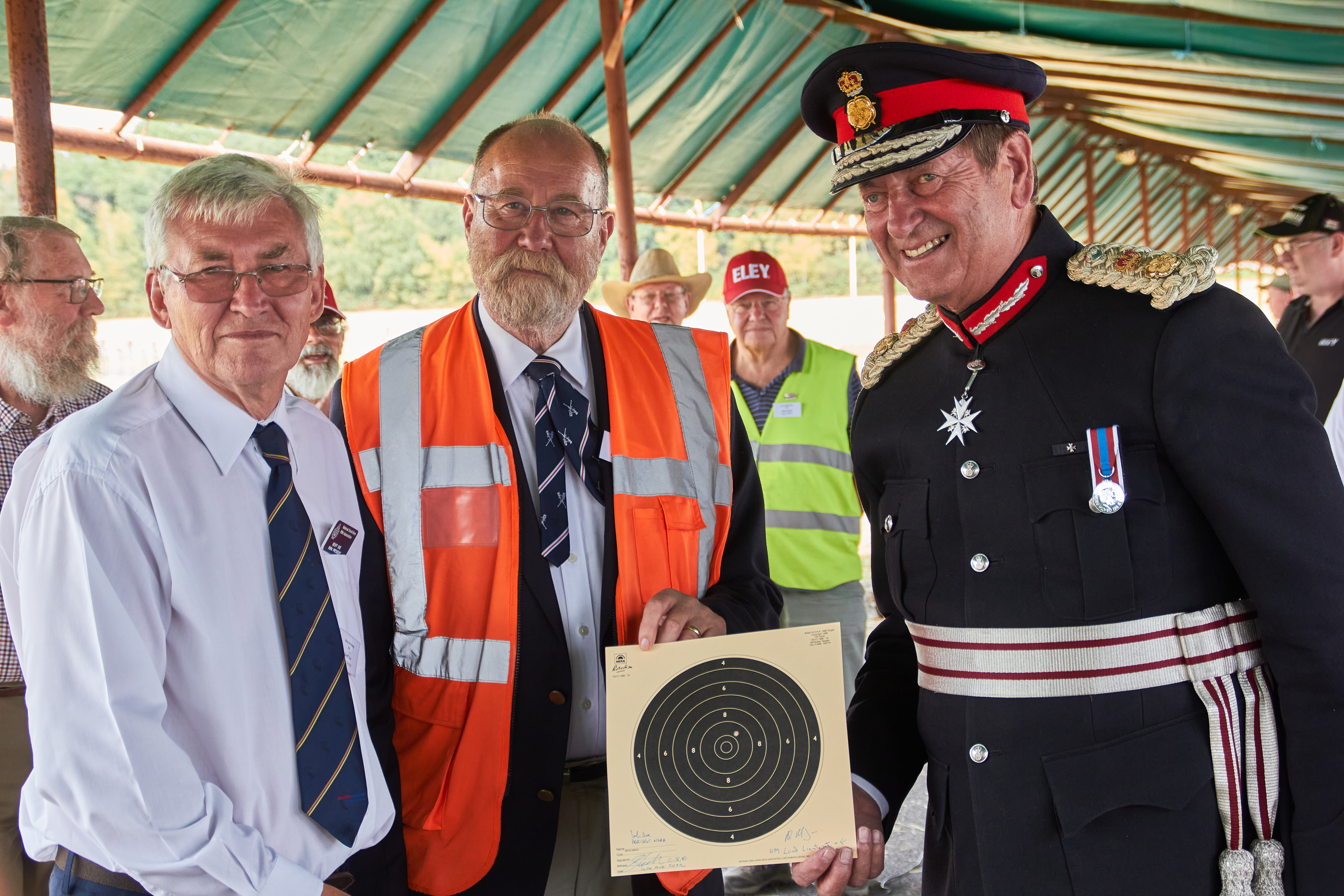
Lord Lieutenant of Surrey with NSRA Officials at the Centenary National Small-bore Rifle Championships at Bisley

In 2022, the NSRA celebrated the "Bisley 100" Centenary edition of the meeting. The opening shot was performed by Michael More-Molyneux DL, Lord Lieutenant of Surrey on behalf of the Queen, then-patron of the association. A number of additional "1922" events were added to the programme, including rapid-fire and timed shoots, derived from original 1922 targets (with scoring rings shrunk to account for improved modern rifles and ammunition). The "Earl Roberts" British Prone Championship was won by Lina Jones following a tie-shoot, the second time she has won the title.

=== Programme ===
- Weekend Aggregate - 60 shots each at 50metres and 100yards, shot over the first weekend
- Grand Aggregate - 100 shots each at 50metres and 100yards, shot Monday-Thursday

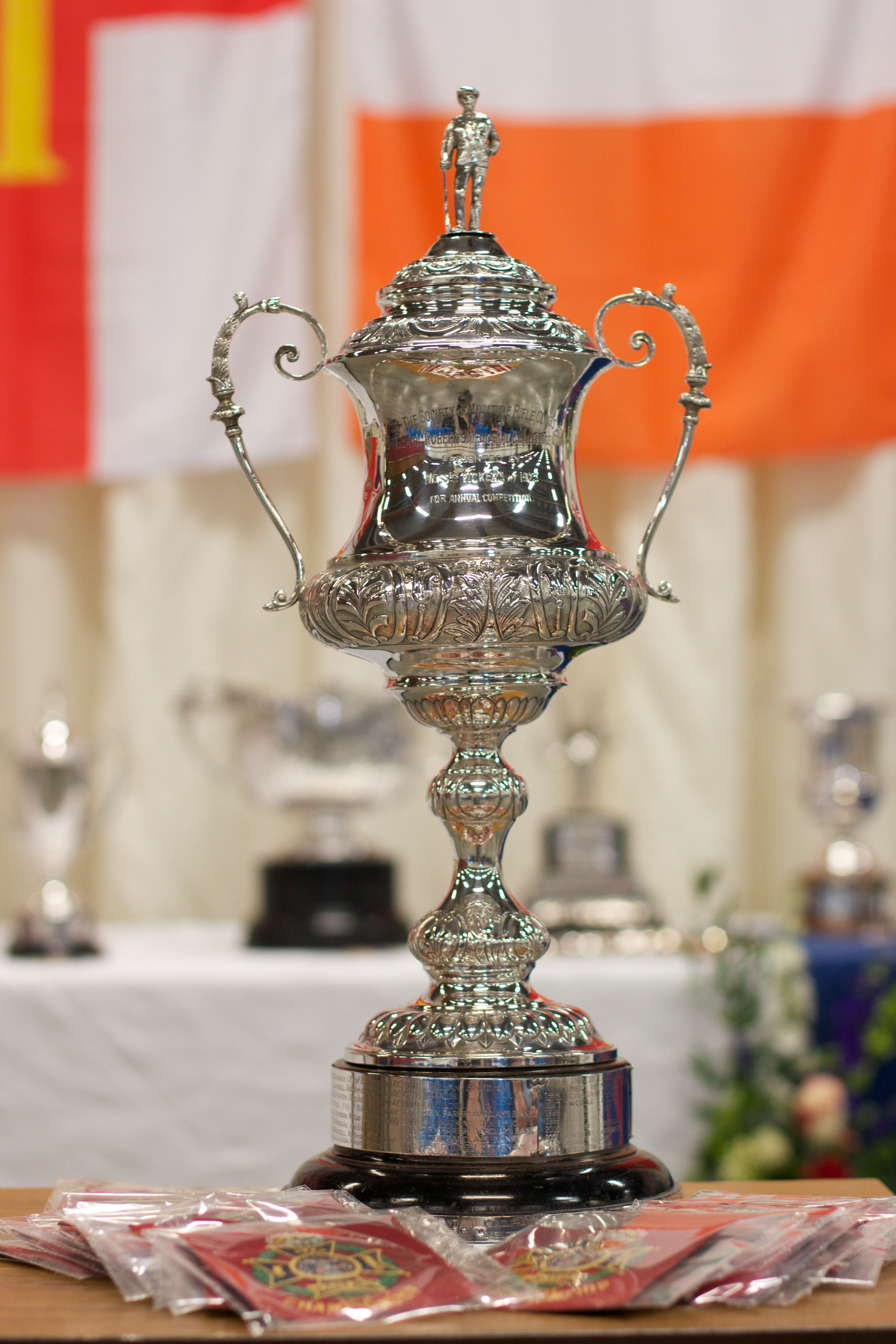
Earl Roberts Memorial Challenge Trophy

- British Prone Rifle Championship (the "Earl Roberts")
  - First stage on Friday, top half or third from each squad progress to second stage (depending on whether there are two or three squads)
  - Second stage on the second Saturday morning, top 20 progress to Final
  - Final on the second Saturday afternoon
- Home Countries International Match - Teams of 10 from each of the Home Nations (including Isle of Man & Channel Islands)
- British Men's 3x40 and Women's 3x20 Championships - Fired on electronic targets
- Double English Match - fired on electronic targets.
- Finals of the Astor Club Team Championship (club teams of 6), the Queen Alexandra Cup (county teams of 6 and individual) and the NSRA/Eley Competitions in Prone and 3P rifle (individual), the initial stages of which are run as postal competitions.
- During the "First Weekend" volunteers run the "SMRC Meeting" – a two-day event for Historic Arms in timelined designs (Classic = pre-1919, Veteran = 1919-1945, Open Historic = pre-1946 and some "Extended period" courses for basic rifles up to about 1960 design. Courses of fire for Prone, Offhand (Standing unsupported) a "new" Standing Supported course based on 19th-century practices: Classes of rifle include Target, Sporting, Military Training and – unusually for the NSRA – allow "pistol-calibre" rifles.

==== "Earl Roberts" British Prone Championship ====
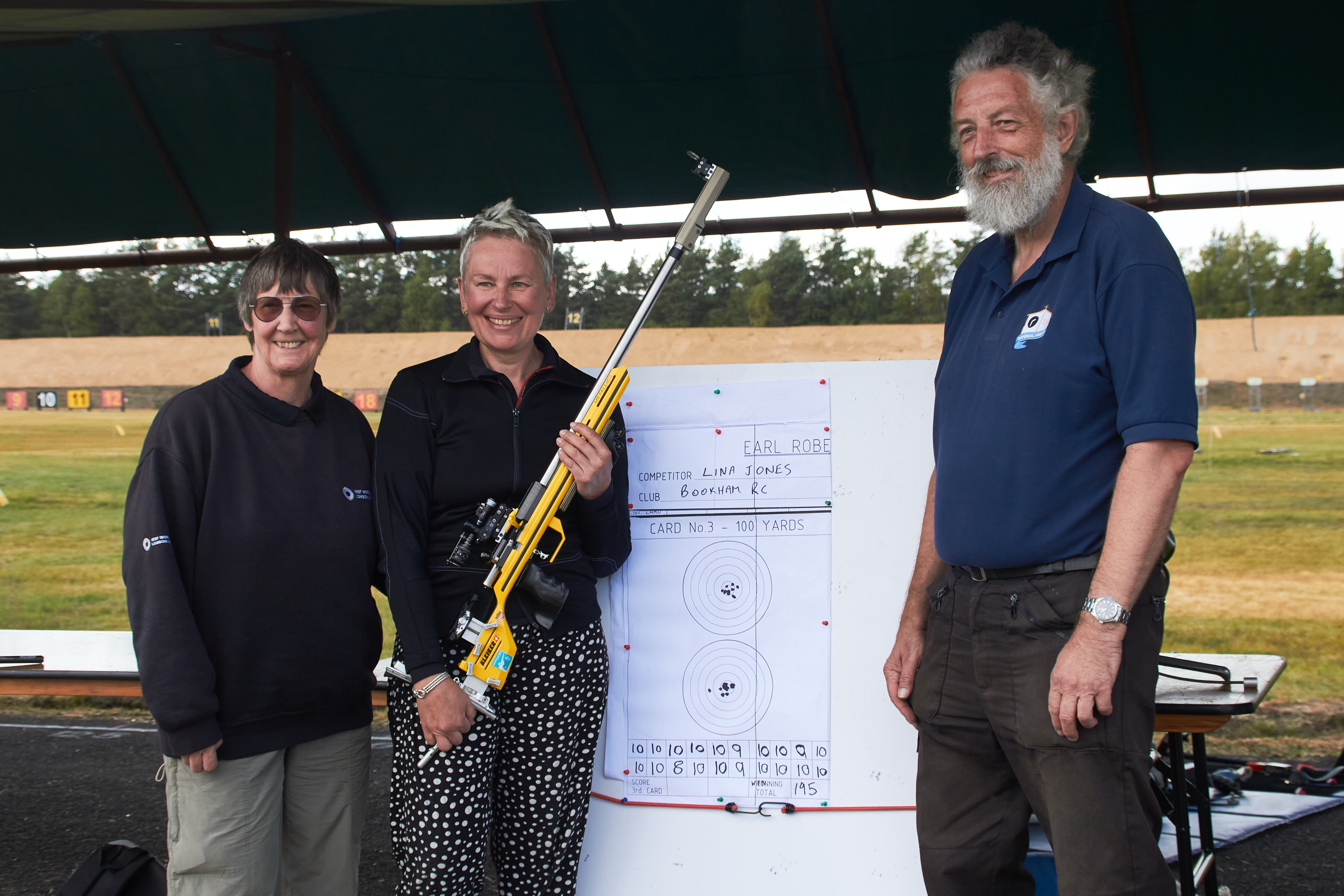
Lina Jones (centre), British Prone Champion 2017, 2022 & 2023, shown at the NSRA Bisley 100 Meeting in 2022

.

Year	Winner	Score	Runner-up	Score
1923	A. Eccles	393	FC Hale	393
1924	H.S. Longhurst			
1925	J.W. Naylor			
1926	H.D. Buck			
1927	L.D. Brooks			
1928	A. Traies			
1929	H.S. Longhurst			
1930	J.J. McKenzie			
1931	D. P. Tilling			
1932	G. Langdon			
1933	W.V. Knight			
1934	A.J. Witcombe			
1935	A. Johnson			
1936	J.G. Proudfoot			
1937	C.C. Sonley			
1938	J.J. McKenzie			
1939	G.A.J. Jones			
1940-45	No Competition			
1946	V.H. Gilbert			
1947	V.H. Gilbert			
1948	H.S. Yeoman			
1949	G.A.J. Jones			
1950	H.R. Hammond			
1951	J. Hall			
1952	W.B. Godwin			
1953	J.E. Leggett			
1954	H.A.S. Bayley			
1955	H.A.S. Bayley			
1956	D. King			
1957	D.R.V. Parish			
1958	T.J. Knight			
1959	A.D. Skinner			
1960	A.D. Skinner			
1961	W. Campbell			
1962	D.R.V. Parish			
1963	J. Hall			
1964	J.E. Fardon			
1965	T.P. Morgan			
1966	G.B. Russell			
1967	M. Wilkinson			
1968	J.B. Flynn			
1969	J.C. Palin			
1970	L.A. Winter			
1971	D.R.V. Parish			
1972	W.H. Watkins			
1973	D.R.V. Parish			
1974	W.G. Doe			
1975	A. St.G. Tucker	788	A.M. Allan	788
1976	B. Dagger			
1977	A.M. Allan			
1978	A.M. Allan			
1979	J.N. Knowles			
1980	R. Jarvis			
1981	P. Martin			
1982	J. C Pearman			
1983	N. Braisher			
1984	W.G. Doe			
1985	E.P. Watson			
1986	N. Braisher			
1987	C.W.C. Ogle			
1988	N. Braisher			
1989	M.D. Cooper			
1990	J. Stern		R. Ambrose	
1991	A.T. Campbell			
1992	J.D.A. Oliphant			
1993	J.D.A. Oliphant			
1994	H.J. Hancox	781	B. Brown	779
1995	M. Phelps			
1996	N. Braisher			
1997	C.W.C. Ogle			
1998	J.A. Cornish			
1999	N.J. Day			
2000	D.W.F. Phelps			
2001	D.W.F. Phelps			
2002	S.R. Bailey			
2003	T.P. Elson			
2004	P.C. Scanlan			
2005	M.I. Babb			
2006	K.A. Ridgway			
2007	Miss M. Smith			
2008	Ms S.M.Sharp			
2009	N. Stirton			
2010	Miss M. Smith			
2011	Miss M. Smith			
2012	G.J. Webb			
2013	W.P. Baird			
2014	K.D. Bowley	772	Ms S.M.Sharp	771
2015	Miss M. Smith	779	K.D. Bowley	775
2016	R. Wilson	762	D. Beere-Waldram	758
2017	Mrs L. Jones	765	Miss A. Fearn	761
2018	J.P.A. Andrews	781	S. Harris	780
2019	T. Dodds	778; Tie-Shoot: 191	J. Paterson	778; Tie-Shoot: 190
2020	No Competition			
2021	No Competition			
2022	Mrs L. Jones	784; Tie-Shoot: 195	D. Cowen	784; Tie-Shoot: 188
2023	Mrs L. Jones	772	S. L. Green	769
2024	J.P.A. Andrews	789	R. Dowling	783
2025	J.P.A. Andrews	786	Ms W. Foith	781
2026	R. Wilson	780; Tie-Shoot: 192	(2nd) J. Paterson (3rd) Miss S. Corish	780 (189); 780 (188)

== See also ==
- British Shooting
- Smallbore rifle shooting
- National Rifle Association (United Kingdom)
