= India at the 2014 Commonwealth Games =

- CG code: IND
- CGA: Indian Olympic Association
- Website: olympic.ind.in

in Glasgow, Scotland
- Competitors: 215 in 14 sports
- Flag bearers: Opening: Vijay Kumar; Closing: Seema Punia
- Medals Ranked 5th: Gold 15 Silver 30 Bronze 19 Total 64

Commonwealth Games appearances (overview)
- 1934; 1938; 1950; 1954; 1958; 1962; 1966; 1970; 1974; 1978; 1982; 1986; 1990; 1994; 1998; 2002; 2006; 2010; 2014; 2018; 2022; 2026; 2030

India participated in the 2014 Commonwealth Games at Glasgow, Scotland, United Kingdom held from 23 July to 3 August 2014. The Indian contingent consisted of 215 athletes competing in 14 sporting disciplines, including seven para-athletes, and 90 officials, coaches and support staff. Of the 17 events, India did not field athletes only in three disciplines—Netball, Rugby sevens and Triathlon.

India won 64 medals including 15 gold, 30 silver, and 19 bronze medals, and was placed fifth in the medal table. Vikas Gowda won a gold in the men's Discus throw event, the country's first gold medal in men's athletics in 56 years. Joshna Chinappa and Dipika Pallikal won the first gold for India in Squash at the Commonwealth Games. Kashyap Parupalli won the gold medal in the men's singles in badminton, becoming the first Indian male shuttler in 32 years to win a gold medal in the singles event at the Commonwealth Games. Dipa Karmakar won a bronze medal in Gymnastics at the 2014 Commonwealth Games – Women's vault, becoming the first female Indian gymnast to win a medal in the sport at the Commonwealth Games.

== Medalists ==
Medal	Name	Sport	Event	Date
Gold	Sanjita Khumukcham	Weightlifting	Women's 48 kg	24 July
Gold	Sukhen Dey	Weightlifting	Men's 56 kg	24 July
Gold	Abhinav Bindra	Shooting	Men's 10 metre air rifle	25 July
Gold	Apurvi Chandela	Shooting	Women's 10 metre air rifle	26 July
Gold	Rahi Sarnobat	Shooting	Women's 25 metre pistol	26 July
Gold	Sathish Sivalingam	Weightlifting	Men's 77 kg	27 July
Gold	Jitu Rai	Shooting	Men's 50 metre pistol	28 July
Gold	Amit Kumar	Wrestling	Men's 57 kg	29 July
Gold	Vinesh Phogat	Wrestling	Women's 48 kg	29 July
Gold	Sushil Kumar	Wrestling	Men's 74 kg	29 July
Gold	Babita Kumari	Wrestling	Women's 55 kg	31 July
Gold	Yogeshwar Dutt	Wrestling	Men's 65 kg	31 July
Gold	Vikas Gowda	Athletics	Men's Discus Throw	31 July
Gold	Dipika Pallikal; Joshna Chinappa	Squash	Women's doubles	2 August
Gold	Kashyap Parupalli	Badminton	Men's singles	3 August
Silver	Mirabai Chanu Saikhom	Weightlifting	Women's 48 kg	24 July
Silver	Shushila Likmabam	Judo	Women's 48 kg	24 July
Silver	Navjot Chana	Judo	Men's 60 kg	24 July
Silver	Malaika Goel	Shooting	Women's 10 metre air pistol	25 July
Silver	Santoshi Matsa	Weightlifting	Women's 53 kg	25 July
Silver	Prakash Nanjappa	Shooting	Men's 10 metre air pistol	26 July
Silver	Ayonika Paul	Shooting	Women's 10 metre air rifle	26 July
Silver	Anisa Sayyed	Shooting	Women's 25 metre pistol	26 July
Silver	Shreyasi Singh	Shooting	Women's Double Trap	27 July
Silver	Katulu Ravi Kumar	Weightlifting	Men's 77 kg	27 July
Silver	Gurpal Singh	Shooting	Men's 50 metre pistol	28 July
Silver	Gagan Narang	Shooting	Men's 50 metre rifle prone	28 July
Silver	Vikas Thakur	Weightlifting	Men's 85 kg	28 July
Silver	Harpreet Singh	Shooting	Men's 25 metre rapid fire pistol	29 July
Silver	Sanjeev Rajput	Shooting	Men's 50 metre rifle 3 positions	29 July
Silver	Rajeev Tomar	Wrestling	Men's 125 kg	29 July
Silver	Lalita Sehrawat	Wrestling	Women's 53 kg	30 July
Silver	Bajrang Punia	Wrestling	Men's 61 kg	30 July
Silver	Sakshi Malik	Wrestling	Women's 58 kg	30 July
Silver	Satyawart Kadian	Wrestling	Men's 97 kg	30 July
Silver	Geetika Jakhar	Wrestling	Women's 63 kg	31 July
Silver	Seema Punia	Athletics	Women's Discus Throw	1 August
Silver	Sharath Kamal; Amalraj Anthony Arputharaj	Table tennis	Men's doubles	1 August
Silver	Laishram Sarita Devi	Boxing	Women's Lightweight	2 August
Silver	Devendro Singh	Boxing	Men's Light Flyweight	2 August
Silver	Mandeep Jangra	Boxing	Men's Welterweight	2 August
Silver	Rajinder Rahelu	Weightlifting	Men's +72 kg	2 August
Silver	Vijender Singh	Boxing	Men's Middleweight	2 August
Silver	Men's hockey team	Hockey	Men's Tournament	3 August
Silver	Jwala Gutta; Ashwini Ponnappa	Badminton	Women's doubles	3 August
Bronze	Ganesh Mali	Weightlifting	Men's 56 kg	24 July
Bronze	Kalpana Thoudam	Judo	Women's 52 kg	24 July
Bronze	Swati Singh	Weightlifting	Women's 53 kg	25 July
Bronze	Rajwinder Kaur	Judo	Women's +78 kg	26 July
Bronze	Omkar Otari	Weightlifting	Men's 69 kg	26 July
Bronze	Mohammed Asab	Shooting	Men's Double Trap	27 July
Bronze	Punam Yadav	Weightlifting	Women's 63 kg	27 July
Bronze	Manavjit Singh Sandhu	Shooting	Men's Trap	29 July
Bronze	Gagan Narang	Shooting	Men's 50 metre rifle 3 positions	29 July
Bronze	Lajja Goswami	Shooting	Women's 50 metre rifle 3 positions	29 July
Bronze	Chandrakant Mali	Weightlifting	Men's 94 kg	29 July
Bronze	Navjot Kaur	Wrestling	Women's 69 kg	30 July
Bronze	Dipa Karmakar	Gymnastics	Women's Vault	31 July
Bronze	Pawan Kumar	Wrestling	Men's 86 kg	31 July
Bronze	Pinki Rani	Boxing	Women's Flyweight	1 August
Bronze	Sakina Khatun	Weightlifting	Women's 61 kg	2 August
Bronze	P. V. Sindhu	Badminton	Women's singles	2 August
Bronze	R.M.V. Gurusaidutt	Badminton	Men's singles	2 August
Bronze	Arpinder Singh	Athletics	Men's Triple Jump	2 August

Medals by sport
Sport	gold	silver	bronze	Total
Wrestling	5	6	2	13
Shooting	4	9	4	17
Weightlifting	3	5	6	14
Badminton	1	1	2	4
Athletics	1	1	1	3
Squash	1	0	0	1
Boxing	0	4	1	5
Judo	0	2	2	4
Hockey	0	1	0	1
Table tennis	0	1	0	1
Gymnastics	0	0	1	1
Total	15	30	19	64

== Athletics ==
=== Men ===
Track & road events

Athlete	Event	Heat		Final	
Athlete	Event	Result	Rank	Result	Rank
Siddhanth Thingalaya	110 m hurdles	13.93	12	Did not advance	
Rajiv Arokia; Kunhu Mohammed; Jithu Baby; Jibin Sebastian	4 × 400 m relay	DQ		Did not advance	

Field events

Athlete	Event	Qualification		Final	
Athlete	Event	Distance	Rank	Distance	Rank
Arpinder Singh	Triple jump	16.51	4 Q	16.63	3rd place, bronze medalist(s)
Om Prakash Singh Karhana	Shot put	18.98	8 Q	18.73	6
Vikas Gowda	Discus throw	64.32	1 Q	63.64	1st place, gold medalist(s)
Chandrodaya Narayan Singh	Hammer throw	67.95	8 Q	67.99	8
Kamalpreet Singh	Hammer throw	65.25	13	Did not advance	
Ravinder Singh Khaira	Javelin throw	72.18	11 Q	NM	
Vipin Kasana	Javelin throw	71.95	12 Q	NM	
Davinder Singh	Javelin throw	70.56	14	Did not advance	

=== Women ===
Track & road events

Athlete	Event	Heat		Semifinal		Final	
Athlete	Event	Result	Rank	Result	Rank	Result	Rank
Sharadha Narayana	100 m	11.81	24 Q	11.71	6	Did not advance	
M. R. Poovamma	400 m	54.01	17 Q	52.88	5	Did not advance	
Ashwini Akkunji	800 m	2:02.74	6 Q	2:03.35	7	Did not advance	
Ashwini Akkunji	400 m hurdles	58.75	5	—N/a		Did not advance	
Saradha Narayan; H M Jyothi; Srabani Nanda; Asha Roy	4 × 100 m relay	44.81	5	—N/a		Did not advance	
M. R. Poovamma; Tintu Luka; Debashree Majumdar; Ashwini Akkunji	4 × 400 m relay	3:33:67	5 Q	—N/a		DQ	

Field events

Athlete	Event	Qualification		Final	
Athlete	Event	Distance	Rank	Distance	Rank
Sahana Kumari	High jump	1.81	7 Q	1.86	8
Mayookha Johny	Long jump	6.11	21	Did not advance	
Seema Antil	Discus throw	58.44	2 Q	58.44	2nd place, silver medalist(s)
Krishna Poonia	Discus throw	51.36	11 Q	57.84	5
Annu Rani	Javelin throw	—N/a		56.37	8

== Badminton ==
Men

Athlete	Event	Round of 64	Round of 32	Round of 16	Quarterfinals	Semifinals	Final / BM	
Athlete	Event	Opposition Result	Opposition Result	Opposition Result	Opposition Result	Opposition Result	Opposition Result	Rank
Parupalli Kashyap	Men's singles	Bye	Thorpe (BAR); W (21–9, 21–5)	Tho (AUS); W (21–7, 21–8)	Liew (MAS); W (21–13, 21–14)	Ouseph (ENG); W (17–21, 21–19, 21–18)	Wong (SGP); W (21–14, 11–21, 21–19)	1st place, gold medalist(s)
Gurusai Dutt	Men's singles	Li (IOM); W (21–5, 21–12)	Ekiring (UGA); W (21–13, 21–11)	D'Souza (CAN); W (21–13, 21–9)	Chong W F (MAS); W (21–15, 8–21, 21–17)	Wong (SGP); L (21–15, 8–21, 21–17)	Ouseph (ENG); W (21–15, 14–21, 21–19)	3rd place, bronze medalist(s)
Srikanth Kidambi	Men's singles	March (SHN); W (21–3, 21–4)	Font (WAL); W (21–8, 21–13)	Karunaratne (SRI); W (20–22, 21–16, 21–12)	Wong (SIN); L (10–21, 21–12, 12–21)	Did not Advance		
Akshay Dewalkar; Pranav Chopra	Men's doubles	Bye	Dias / Goonethilleka (SRI); W (21–10, 21–9)	Tan W K / Goh V S (MAS); L (13–21, 14–21)	Did not Advance			

Women

Athlete	Event	Round of 64	Round of 32	Round of 16	Quarterfinals	Semifinals	Final / BM	
Athlete	Event	Opposition Result	Opposition Result	Opposition Result	Opposition Result	Opposition Result	Opposition Result	Rank
P. V. Sindhu	Women's singles	Bye	Le Grange (RSA); W (21–4, 21–6)	Hendahewa (SRI); W (21–14, 21–14)	Rankin (NZL); W (21–10, 21–9)	Li (CAN); L (20–22, 20–22)	Tee J Y (MAS); W (23–21, 21–9)	3rd place, bronze medalist(s)
P. C. Thulasi	Women's singles	Bye	Chambers (NIR); W (21–10, 21–2)	Honderich (CAN); W (21–12, 21–7)	Tee J Y (MAS); L (21–18, 19–21, 19–21)	Did not Advance		
Jwala Gutta; Ashwini Ponnappa	Women's doubles	—N/a	Tekeiaki / Utimawa (KIR); W (w/o)	He T T / Veeran (AUS); W (18–21, 21–10, 21–6)	Ratnasiri / Weerasinghe (SRI); W (21–10, 21–9)	Lim Y L / Lai P J (MAS); W (21–7, 21–12)	Woon K W / Hoo (MAS); L (17–21, 21–23)	2nd place, silver medalist(s)

=== Mixed team ===
Summary

Team	Event	Group stage				Quarterfinal	Semifinal	Final / BM	
Team	Event	Opposition Score	Opposition Score	Opposition Score	Rank	Opposition Score	Opposition Score	Opposition Score	Rank
India	Mixed team	Ghana; W 5–0	Uganda; W 5–0	Canada; W 5–0	1 Q	Canada; W 3–1	England; L 0–3	Singapore; L 2–3	4

Pool B

Pos	Team	Pld	W	L	GF	GA	GD	PF	PA	PD	Pts	Qualification
1	India	3	3	0	30	0	+30	630	195	+435	3	Quarterfinals
2	Ghana	3	2	1	12	19	−7	457	586	−129	2	
3	Uganda	3	1	2	11	21	−10	473	593	−120	1	
4	Kenya	3	0	3	9	22	−13	414	600	−186	0	

Source: glasgow2014.com

India
5
Commonwealth Arena, Glasgow
24 July

Ghana
0

			1	2	3
1	(India) (Ghana)	Kashyap Parupalli; Daniel Sam	21; 6	21; 16
2	(India) (Ghana)	P. V. Sindhu; Stella Amasha	21; 7	21; 5
3	(India) (Ghana)	Akshay Dewalkar / Pranav Chopra; Emmanuel Donkor / Abraham Ayittey	21; 7	21; 11
4	(India) (Ghana)	Jwala Gutta / Ashwini Ponnappa; Diana Archer / Evelyn Botwe	21; 4	21; 10
5	(India) (Ghana)	Srikanth Kidambi / P. C. Thulasi; Daniel Sam / Stella Amasha	21; 5	21; 9

India
5
Commonwealth Arena, Glasgow
24 July

Uganda
0

			1	2	3
1	(India) (Uganda)	R. M. V. Gurusaidutt / P. V. Sindhu; Wilson Tukire / Daisy Nakalyango	21; 4	21; 6
2	(India) (Uganda)	Srikanth Kidambi; Edwin Ekiring	21; 10	21; 8
3	(India) (Uganda)	P. C. Thulasi; Margaret Nankabirwa	21; 3	21; 1
4	(India) (Uganda)	Akshay Dewalkar / Pranav Chopra; Edwin Ekiring / Wilson Tukire	21; 6	21; 8
5	(India) (Uganda)	Jwala Gutta / Ashwini Ponnappa; Margaret Nankabirwa / Daisy Nakalyango	21; 4	21; 8

India
5
Commonwealth Arena, Glasgow
25 July

Kenya
0

			1	2	3
1	(India) (Kenya)	Srikanth Kidambi / Jwala Gutta; Patrick Kinyua Mbogo / Mercy Joseph	21; 8	21; 8
2	(India) (Kenya)	Parupalli Kashyap; Victor Odera Munga	21; 7	21; 8
3	(India) (Kenya)	P. C. Thulasi; Lavina Martins	21; 4	21; 2
4	(India) (Kenya)	R.M.V. Gurusaidutt / Pranav Chopra; Matheri Joseph Githitu / Patrick Kinyua Mbogo	21; 5	21; 6
5	(India) (Kenya)	P. V. Sindhu / Jwala Gutta; Lavina Martins / Mercy Joseph	21; 4	21; 5

Quarterfinals

Canada
1
Commonwealth Arena, Glasgow
26 July

India
3

			1	2	3
1	(Canada) (India)	Toby Ng / Alex Bruce; Srikanth Kidambi / Jwala Gutta	19; 21	21; 17	18; 21
2	(Canada) (India)	Andrew D'Souza; Kashyap Parupalli	11; 21	9; 21
3	(Canada) (India)	Michelle Li; P. V. Sindhu	15; 21	22; 20	21; 17
4	(Canada) (India)	Adrian Liu / Derrick Ng; Pranav Chopra / Akshay Dewalkar	15; 21	21; 19	13; 21

Semifinals

India
0
Commonwealth Arena, Glasgow
27 July

England
3

			1	2	3
1	(India) (England)	Akshay Dewalkar / Jwala Gutta; Chris Adcock / Gabby Adcock	16; 21	21; 16	11; 21
2	(India) (England)	Kashyap Parupalli; Rajiv Ouseph	16; 21	19; 21
3	(India) (England)	Akshay Dewalkar / Pranav Chopra; Chris Adcock / Andrew Ellis	21; 12	13; 21	16; 21

Bronze medal

Singapore
3
Commonwealth Arena, Glasgow
28 July

India
2

			1	2	3
1	(Singapore) (India)	Danny Bawa Chrisnanta / Vanessa Neo; R.M.V. Gurusaidutt / Ashwini Ponnappa	21; 19	21; 19
2	(Singapore) (India)	Huang Chao; Kashyap Parupalli	15; 21	20; 22
3	(Singapore) (India)	Danny Bawa Chrisnanta / Chayut Triyachart; Akshay Dewalker & Pranav Chopra	21; 12	21; 16
4	(Singapore) (India)	Liang Xiaoyu; P. V. Sindhu	22; 24	13; 21
5	(Singapore) (India)	Shinta Mulia Sari / Yao Lei; Jwala Gutta / Ashwini Ponnappa	21; 17	29; 27

== Boxing ==
Men

Athlete	Event	Round of 32	Round of 16	Quarterfinals	Semifinals	Final	
Athlete	Event	Opposition Result	Opposition Result	Opposition Result	Opposition Result	Opposition Result	Rank
Devendro Singh	49 kg	Bye	Gamage (SRI); W 3–0	Ahmed (SCO); W 3–0	Williams (WAL); W 3–0	Barnes (NIR); L 0–3	2nd place, silver medalist(s)
Shiva Thapa	56 kg	Bye	Conlan (NIR); L 0–3	Did not Advance			
Manoj Kumar	64 kg	Moshoeshoe (LES); W 3–0	Biyarslanov (CAN); W 2–1	Maxwell (ENG); L 0–3	Did not Advance		
Mandeep Jangra	69 kg	Mathule (MOZ); W 3–0	Davis (JAM); W 3–0	Lewis (AUS); W 3–0	Donnelly (NIR); W 2–1	Fitzgerald (ENG); L 0–KO3	2nd place, silver medalist(s)
Vijender Singh	75 kg	Kometa (KIR); W 3–0	Kasuto (NAM); W 3–0	Prince (TRI); W 3–0	Coyle (NIR); W 3–0	Fowler (ENG); L 0–3	2nd place, silver medalist(s)
Sumit Sangwan	81 kg	Bye	Fumu (TAN); W 3–0	Nyika (NZL); L 0–3	Did not Advance		
Amritpreet Singh	91 kg	—N/a	Bye	Lavelle (SCO); L 0–3	Did not Advance		
Parveen Kumar	+91 kg	—N/a	Henderson (SCO); L 0–3	Did not Advance			

Women

Athlete	Event	Round of 16	Quarterfinals	Semifinals	Final	
Athlete	Event	Opposition Result	Opposition Result	Opposition Result	Opposition Result	Rank
Pinki Rani	51 kg	Bye	Wangi (PNG); W 3–0	Walsh (NIR); L 0–2	Did not Advance	3rd place, bronze medalist(s)
Laishram Sarita Devi	60 kg	Obareh (NGR); W 3–0	Jones (WAL); W 2–1	Machongua (MOZ); W 3–0	Watts (AUS); L 0–3	2nd place, silver medalist(s)
Pooja Rani	75 kg	Marshall (ENG); L 0–3	Did not Advance			

== Cycling ==
=== Track ===
Sprint

Athlete	Event	Qualifying		First round		Repechage		Quarterfinals		Semifinals		Final / BM	
Athlete	Event	Time	Rank	Time	Rank	Time	Rank	Time	Rank	Time	Rank	Time	Rank
Amrit Singh	Men's individual	11.193	23	Did Not Advance									
Amarjeet Singh Nagi	Men's individual	11.114	22	Did Not Advance									
Alan Baby	Men's individual	11.885	25	Did Not Advance									
Amrit Singh; Amarjeet Singh Nagi; Alan Baby	Men's team	49.233	7	—N/a								Did Not Advance	
Deborah Herold	Women's individual	12.483	10	—N/a				Did Not Advance					
Mahitha Mohan	Women's individual	13.059	11	—N/a				Did Not Advance					
Kezia Varghese	Women's individual	13.162	12	—N/a				Did Not Advance					

Keirin

Athlete	Event	First Round	Repechage	Semifinals	Final
Athlete	Event	Rank	Rank	Rank	Rank
Amrit Singh	Men	6 R	5	Did Not Advance	
Amarjeet Singh Nagi	Men	6 R	4	Did Not Advance	
Alan Baby	Men	6 R	4	Did Not Advance	

Time trial

Athlete	Event	Time	Rank
Amrit Singh	Men	1:06.903	13
Amarjeet Singh Nagi	Men	1:08.117	14
Alan Baby	Men	1:10.579	16
Deborah Herold	Women	36.611	10
Mahitha Mohan	Women	36.869	11
Kezia Varghese	Women	39.387	13

Pursuit

Athlete	Event	Qualifying		Final	
Athlete	Event	Time	Rank	Time	Rank
Amit Kumar	Men's individual	4:58.444	18	Did Not Advance	
Manjeet Singh	Men's individual	4:55.164	16	Did Not Advance	
Sombir Mahala	Men's individual	4:57.202	17	Did Not Advance	
Amit Kumar; Sombir Mahala; Manjeet Singh; Suresh Bishnoi	Men's team	4:31.714	6	Did Not Advance	
Sunita Yanglem	Women's individual	4:07.614	17	Did Not Advance	

Points race

Athlete	Event	Qualifying		Final	
Athlete	Event	Points	Rank	Points	Rank
Amit Kumar	Men	0	14	Did not advance	
Shreedhar Savanur	Men	—N/a	DNF	Did not advance	
Sombir Mahala	Men	0	15	Did not advance	
Sunita Yanglem	Women	—N/a	DNF	Did not advance	

Scratch race

Athlete	Event	Qualification	Final
Athlete	Event	Rank	Rank
Amit Kumar	Men	DNF	Did Not Advance
Shreedhar Savanur	Men	DNF	Did Not Advance
Sombir Mahala	Men	DNF	Did Not Advance
Sunita Yanglem	Women	—N/a	DNF

=== Road ===
Athlete	Event	Final	
Athlete	Event	Time	Rank
Amit Kumar	Men's Road Race	DNF	
Suresh Bishnoi	Men's Road Race	DNF	
Arvind Panwar	Men's Road Race	DNF	
Shreedhar Savanur	Men's Road Race	DNF	
Manjeet Singh	Men's Road Race	DNF	
Sombir Mahala	Men's Road Race	DNF	
Arvind Panwar	Men's time trial	57:21.52	28
Sombir Mahala	Men's time trial	59:10.76	37

== Diving ==
Men

Athlete	Event	Preliminaries		Final	
Athlete	Event	Points	Rank	Points	Rank
Ramananda Kongbrailatpam	1 m springboard	294.95	13	Did not advance	
Ramananda Kongbrailatpam	3 m springboard	358.70	13	Did not advance	
Siddharth Pardeshi	3 m springboard	271.55	17	Did not advance	
Siddharth Pardeshi	10 m platform	256.65	11 Q	258.30	11

== Field hockey ==
Summary

Key:

- FT = After full time
- P = Match decided by penalty-shootout

Team	Event	Preliminary round					Semifinal	Final / BM / PM	
Team	Event	Opposition Result	Opposition Result	Opposition Result	Opposition Result	Rank	Opposition Result	Opposition Result	Rank
India men	Men's tournament	Wales; W 3–1	Scotland; W 6–2	Australia; L 2–4	South Africa; W 5–2	2 Q	New Zealand; W 3–2	Australia; L 0–4	2nd place, silver medalist(s)
India women	Women's tournament	Canada; W 4–2	New Zealand; L 0–3	Trinidad and Tobago; W 14–0	South Africa; L 2–3	3	Did not advance	Scotland; W 2–1	5

=== Men's tournament ===
Pool A

Pos	Team	Pld	W	D	L	GF	GA	GD	Pts	Qualification
1	Australia	4	4	0	0	22	3	+19	12	Semi-finals
2	India	4	3	0	1	16	9	+7	9	Semi-finals
3	South Africa	4	2	0	2	9	12	−3	6	
4	Scotland	4	1	0	3	6	16	−10	3	
5	Wales	4	0	0	4	6	19	−13	0	

Source: FIH
Rules for classification: 1) points; 2) goal difference; 3) goals scored; 4) head-to-head result.

25 July 2014
09:00

India	3–1	Wales
Raghunath 20'; R. Singh 42'; Chandi 47'	Report	Cornick 23'

Umpires:
Peter Wright (RSA)
Lim Hong Zhen (SIN)

26 July 2014
16:00

India	6–2	Scotland
G. Singh 6'; Raghunath 23', 45'; R. Singh 37', 48'; Chandi 40'	Report	Bain 56'; Parkes 69'

Umpires:
Gareth Greenfield (NZL)
Eric Koh (MAS)

29 July 2014
14:00

India	2–4	Australia
R. Singh 35'; Ra. Singh 49'	Report	C. Ciriello 15', 50'; Orchard 17'; Whetton 27'

Umpires:
Martin Madden (SCO)
Dan Barstow (ENG)

31 July 2014
16:00

South Africa	2–5	India
Paton 42'; Smith 47'	Report	Raghunath 3'; R. Singh 9'; Ra. Singh 22'; Sowmarpet 26'; M. Singh 58'

Umpires:
Adam Kearns (AUS)
Gareth Greenfield (NZL)

Semi-finals

2 August 2014
12:15

New Zealand	2–3	India
S. Child 2'; Haig 18'	Report	R. Singh 28'; Ra. Singh 42'; A. Singh 47'

Umpires:
Adam Kearns (AUS)
Dan Barstow (ENG)

Final

3 August 2014
12:15

(gold) Australia	4–0	India (silver)
Ciriello 13', 29', 47'; Ockenden 51'	Report

Umpires:
Dan Barstow (ENG)
Martin Madden (SCO)

=== Women's tournament ===
Pool A

Team	Pld	W	D	L	GF	GA	GD	Pts	Qualification
New Zealand	4	4	0	0	25	1	+24	12	Semi-finals
South Africa	4	3	0	1	22	4	+18	9	Semi-finals
India	4	2	0	2	20	8	+12	6	
Canada	4	1	0	3	6	13	−7	3	
Trinidad and Tobago	4	0	0	4	1	48	−47	0	

24 July 2014
16:00

India	4–2	Canada
Rampal 22'; Rani 29'; J. Kaur 38', 53'	Report	Stairs 25'; Johansen 46'

Umpires:
Kylie Seymour (AUS)
Hannah Sanders (ENG)

27 July 2014
16:00

India	0–3	New Zealand
	Report	Flynn 3'; Punt 47', 53'

Umpires:
Kylie Seymour (AUS)
Nur Hafizah Azman (MAS)

28 July 2014
19:00

Trinidad and Tobago	0–14	India
	Report	Katariya 4'; Thakur 11', 27', 64'; Rampal 12', 19', 25'; Kaur 18', 41', 48'; Rani 22'; Thokchom 31'; Barla 53'; Arya 68'

Umpires:
Hannah Sanders (ENG)
Nor Hafizah Azman (MAS)

30 July 2014
16:00

India	2–3	South Africa
Kaur 34'; Rampal 59'	Report	Bright 14'; Chamberlain 35'; Davids 54'

Umpires:
Hannah Sanders (ENG)
Dino Willox (WAL)

5th place play-off

1 August 2014
10:00

India	2–1	Scotland
Barla 53'; P. Rani 57'	Report	Kidd 55'

Umpires:
Miskarmalia Ariffin (SIN)
Ayana McClean (TTO)

== Gymnastics ==
=== Artistic Gymnastics ===
Men
Team Final & Individual Qualification

Athlete	Event	Apparatus						Total	Rank
Athlete	Event	F	PH	R	V	PB	HB	Total	Rank
Rakesh Patra	Team	11.433	10.733	14.266	14.000	14.333	12.666	77.431	14
Aditya Singh Rana	Team	13.500	11.800	12.466	14.033	13.266	12.275	77.340	17
Ashish Kumar	Team	13.650 Q	12.533	12.100	13.333 Q	12.133	13.333	77.082	18
Partha Mondal	Team	—N/a		13.433	—N/a	12.733	11.766	—N/a	
Siddharth Verma	Team	11.400	12.833	—N/a	12.066	—N/a			
Total	Team	41.666	36.699	41.232	40.274	39.582	36.399	235.852	7

Individual Finals

Athlete	Event	Score	Rank
Ashish Kumar	Men's floor	13.800	6
Ashish Kumar	Men's vault	7.166	8

==== Women ====
Team Final & Individual Qualification

Athlete	Event	Apparatus				Total	Rank
Athlete	Event	V	UB	BB	F	Total	Rank
Aruna Reddy	Team	13.500	—N/a	10.466	11.300	—N/a	
Pranati Das	Team	12.666	8.000	8.966	10.233	39.965	36
Rucha Divekar	Team	—N/a	7.666	—N/a			
Dipa Karmakar	Team	13.200 Q	9.700	11.966	12.066	46.932	23 Q
Pranati Nayak	Team	13.066	10.366	10.333	10.391	44.156	32
Total	Team	39.776	28.066	32.765	33.757	134.354	11

Individual Finals

Athlete	Event	Apparatus				Total	Rank
Athlete	Event	V	UB	BB	F	Total	Rank
Dipa Karmakar	All-around	13.833	10.633	12.300	10.666	47.432	22
Dipa Karmakar	Vault	14.366	—N/a				3rd place, bronze medalist(s)

=== Rhythmic Gymnastics ===
Women

Athlete	Event	Qualification					
Athlete	Event	Hoop	Ball	Clubs	Ribbon	Total	Rank
Prabhjot Bajwa	Individual	8.300	8.075	8.950	7.600	32.925	30
Palak Bijral	Individual	5.600	6.625	6.650	5.700	24.575	32
Mitali Dogra	Individual	6.950	6.500	7.700	5.600	26.750	31
Total	Team	20.850	21.200	23.300	18.900	73.050	9

== Judo ==
=== Men ===
Athlete	Event	Round of 32	Round of 16	Quarterfinals	Semifinals	Repechage	Final / BM	
Athlete	Event	Opposition Result	Opposition Result	Opposition Result	Opposition Result	Opposition Result	Opposition Result	Rank
Navjot Chana	60 kg	—N/a	Pappas (AUS); W 0023–0000	Dodge (WAL); W 1101–0101	La Grange (RSA); W 1000–0001	—N/a	McKenzie (ENG); L 0103–0101	2nd place, silver medalist(s)
Manjeet Nandal	66 kg	Saywell (MLT); W 1001–0011	Weithers (BAR); W 1001–0000	Oates (ENG); L 0000–1001	Did not advance	Etoga (CMR); W 1003–0002	Mabulu (RSA); L 0003–0002	4
Balvinder Singh	73 kg	Madeira (MOZ); L 001–101	Did Not Advance					
Vikender Singh	81 kg	Fouda (CMR); L 0001–1100	Did not Advance					
Avtar Singh	90 kg	—N/a	Purssey (SCO); L 0000–1001	Did Not Advance				
Sahil Pathania	100 kg	—N/a	Normeshie (GHA); W 1000–0000	Koster (NZL); L 0003–1020	Did Not Advance	Dugasse (SEY); W 1000–0000	Slyfield (NZL); L 000–100	4
Parikshit Kumar	+100 kg	—N/a	Razak (MAS); W 1001–0000	Rosser (NZL); L 0000–1010	Did Not Advance	McNeill (NIR); W 1001–0100	Andrewartha (AUS); L 0000–1001	4

=== Women ===
Athlete	Event	Round of 16	Quarterfinals	Semifinals	Repechage	Final / BM	
Athlete	Event	Opposition Result	Opposition Result	Opposition Result	Opposition Result	Opposition Result	Rank
Sushila Likmabam	48 kg	Effa (CMR); W 1010–0001	Meyer (AUS); W 1000–0003	Rayner (AUS); W 102–000	—N/a	Renicks (SCO); L 0002–1000	2nd place, silver medalist(s)
Kalpana Thoudam	52 kg	—N/a	Trotter (AUS); W 0023–0002	Renicks (SCO); L 0002–1000	—N/a	Legentil (MRI); W 0002–0003	3rd place, bronze medalist(s)
Shivani	57 kg	Klimkait (CAN); L 0003–1020	Did Not Advance				
Garima Chaudhary	63 kg	Fopa (CMR); W 0001–0002	Clark (SCO); L 0002–1000	Did Not Advance	Yeats-Brown (ENG); L 0002–1000	Did Not Advance	
Sunibala Huidrom	70 kg	Zikhale (BOT); W 1100–0000	Arscott (AUS); L 0002–0010	Did Not Advance	Burgess (CAN); W 0001–0002	Conway (SCO); L 0003–0000	4
Jina Devi Chongtham	78 kg	—N/a	Portuondo (CAN); L 0001–1000	Did Not Advance	—N/a	Atangana (CMR); L 000–101	4
Rajwinder Kaur	+78 kg	—N/a	Myers (ENG); L 0003–1000	Did Not Advance	Vaillancourt (CAN); W 0102–0002	Ratugi (KEN); W 0000–0003	3rd place, bronze medalist(s)

== Lawn bowls ==
Men

Athlete	Event	Group Stage					Quarterfinal	Semifinal	Final / BM	
Athlete	Event	Opposition Score	Opposition Score	Opposition Score	Opposition Score	Rank	Opposition Score	Opposition Score	Opposition Score	Rank
Sunil Bahadur	Singles	Rais (MAS); L 20–21	Bester (CAN); L 10–21	Shahzad (PAK); W 20–18	Tuikiligana (FIJ); W 21–12	3	Did not advance			
Chandan Singh; Dinesh Kumar	Pairs	England; L 12–19	Fiji; W 15–11	Wales; L 14–26	—N/a	3	Did not advance			
Kamal Sharma; Sunil Bahadur; Samit Malhorta	Triples	Scotland; L 6–27	Niue; W 21–12	Namibia; L 12–15	Wales; L 13–17	4	Did not advance			
Kamal Sharma; Chandan Singh; Samit Malhorta; Dinesh Kumar	Fours	South Africa; W 17–12	Falkland Islands; W 22–6	Namibia; W 17–12	Namibia; W 18–8	1 Q	Norfolk Island; W 26–4	England; L 12–14	Australia; L 14–15	4

Women

Athlete	Event	Group Stage					Quarterfinal	Semifinal	Final / BM	
Athlete	Event	Opposition Score	Opposition Score	Opposition Score	Opposition Score	Rank	Opposition Score	Opposition Score	Opposition Score	Rank
Nayanmoni Saikia	Singles	Ahmad (MAS); W 21–15	Edwards (NZL); L 10–21	Anderson (NFK); L 6–21	Rereiti (NIU); W 21–10	3	Did not advance			
Tania Choudhury; Pinki Singh	Pairs	Jersey; W 14–12	Kenya; W 20–12	New Zealand; L 11–24	Fiji; L 10–15	3	Did not advance			
Rupa Rani Tirkey; Nayanmoni Saikia; Lovely Choubey	Triples	Malaysia; L 14–16	Niue; W 30–1	Australia; D 13–13	Jersey; W 18–14	3	Did not advance			
Tania Choudhury; Pinki Singh; Rupa Rani Tirkey; Lovely Choubey	Fours	Fiji; L 8–19	Niue; W 20–12	Malaysia; L 10–19	Northern Ireland; L 12–13	4	Did not advance			

== Shooting ==
=== Men ===
Athlete	Event	Qualification		Final	
Athlete	Event	Points	Rank	Points	Rank
Abhinav Bindra	10m air rifle	622.2	3 Q	205.3	1st place, gold medalist(s)
Ravi Kumar	10m air rifle	620.6	4 Q	162.4	4
Prakash Nanjappa	10m air pistol	580	1 Q	198.2	2nd place, silver medalist(s)
Om Prakash Mitharwal	10m air pistol	568	9	Did Not Advance	
Jitu Rai	50m pistol	562	1 Q	194.1	1st place, gold medalist(s)
Gurpal Singh	50m pistol	538	6 Q	187.2	2nd place, silver medalist(s)
Sanjeev Rajput	50m rifle 3 positions	1053	4 Q	446.9	2nd place, silver medalist(s)
Gagan Narang	50m rifle 3 positions	1056	2 Q	436.8	3rd place, bronze medalist(s)
Gagan Narang	50m rifle prone	620.5	3 Q	203.6	2nd place, silver medalist(s)
Joydeep Karmakar	50m rifle prone	617.0	9	Did Not Advance	

Athlete	Event	Qualification 1		Qualification 2		Semifinal		Final / BM	
Athlete	Event	Points	Rank	Points	Rank	Points	Rank	Points	Rank
Harpreet Singh	25m rapid fire pistol	292	1	573	1 Q	—N/a		21	2nd place, silver medalist(s)
Vijay Kumar	25m rapid fire pistol	281	4	555	7	—N/a		Did Not Advance	
Manavjit Singh Sandhu	Trap	49	2	117	4 Q	13	3 QB	11	3rd place, bronze medalist(s)
Mansher Singh	Trap	50	1	117	3 Q	11	6	Did Not Advance	
Mohammed Asab	Double trap	135	1 Q	—N/a		27	3 QB	26	3rd place, bronze medalist(s)
Ankur Mittal	Double trap	132	2 Q	—N/a		25	5	Did Not Advance	
Mairaj Ahmad Khan	Skeet	70	8	117	7	Did Not Advance			
Baba P.S. Bedi	Skeet	64	19	105	19	Did Not Advance			

=== Women ===
Athlete	Event	Qualification		Final	
Athlete	Event	Points	Rank	Points	Rank
Apurvi Chandela	10m air rifle	415.6	1 Q	206.7	1st place, gold medalist(s)
Ayonika Paul	10m air rifle	413.2	4 Q	204.9	2nd place, silver medalist(s)
Malaika Goel	10m air pistol	378	4 Q	197.1	2nd place, silver medalist(s)
Heena Sidhu	10m air pistol	383	1 Q	95.8	7
Elizabeth Susan Koshy	50m rifle 3 positions	566	9	Did Not Advance	
Lajja Goswami	50m rifle 3 positions	571	6 Q	436.1	3rd place, bronze medalist(s)
Lajja Goswami	50m rifle prone	—N/a		612.3	11
Meena Kumari	50m rifle prone	—N/a		615.3	6
Shreyasi Singh	Double trap	—N/a		92	2nd place, silver medalist(s)
Varsha Varman	Double trap	—N/a		88	5

Athlete	Event	Qualification		Qualification Rapid Fire		Semifinal		Final / BM	
Athlete	Event	Points	Rank	Points	Rank	Points	Rank	Points	Rank
Rahi Sarnobat	25m pistol	282	9	575	4 Q	16	1 QF	8	1st place, gold medalist(s)
Anisa Sayyed	25m pistol	286	2	568	7 Q	14	2 QF	2	2nd place, silver medalist(s)
Shreyasi Singh	Trap	66	7	—N/a		Did Not Advance			
Seema Tomar	Trap	65	8	—N/a		Did Not Advance			
Arti Singh Rao	Skeet	67	5	—N/a		12	5	Did Not Advance	

== Squash ==
Singles

Athlete	Event	Round of 64	Round of 32	Round of 16	Quarterfinals	Semifinals	Final/BM	
Athlete	Event	Opposition Score	Opposition Score	Opposition Score	Opposition Score	Opposition Score	Opposition Score	Rank
Saurav Ghosal	Men's singles	Snagg (SVG); W 3–0	Coll (NZL); W 3–0	Finitsis (AUS); W 3–2	Grayson (NZL); W 3–2	Willstrop (ENG); L 0–3	Barker (ENG); L 1–3	4
Mahesh Mangaonkar	Men's singles	Bye	Reel (KEN); W 3–0	Barker (ENG); L 0–3	Did Not Advance			
Harinder Pal Sandhu	Men's singles	Bye	Craig (NIR); W 3–0	Clyne (SCO); L 2–3	Did Not Advance			
Dipika Pallikal	Women's singles	Bye	Knaggs (TTO); W 3–0	Arnold (MAS); W 3–0	Waters (ENG); L 1–3	Did Not Advance		
Joshna Chinappa	Women's singles	Bye	Saffery (WAL); W 3–1	King (NZL); L 1–3	Did Not Advance			
Anaka Alankamony	Women's singles	Nimji (KEN); W 3–0	Arnold (MAS); L 0–3	Did Not Advance				

Doubles

Athlete	Event	Group Stage				Round of 16	Quarter Final	Semi Final	Final/BM	
Athlete	Event	Opposition Score	Opposition Score	Opposition Score	Rank	Opposition Score	Opposition Score	Opposition Score	Opposition Score	Rank
Saurav Ghosal; Harinder Pal Sandhu	Men's doubles	Jervis / Blair (CAY); W 2–1	Creed / Evans (WAL); L 0–2	Kadoma / Kawooya (UGA); W 2–0	2 Q	Lobban / Crawford (SCO); L 1–2	Did Not Advance			
Dipika Pallikal; Joshna Chinappa	Women's doubles	Methsarani / Udangawa (SRI); W 2–0	David / Low W W (MAS); W 2–0	Craig / Lindsay (NZL); W 2–0	1 Q	—N/a	King / Landers-Murphy (NZL); W 2–0	Grinham / Brown (AUS); W 2–1	Massaro / Duncalf (ENG); W 2–0	1st place, gold medalist(s)
Dipika Pallikal; Saurav Ghosal	Mixed doubles	Gunawardane / Laksiri (SRI); W 2–0	Cornett / Delierre (CAN); W 2–0	—N/a	1 Q	Saffery / Evans (WAL); W 2–0	Grinham / Palmer (AUS); L 0–2	Did Not Advance		
Joshna Chinappa; Harinder Pal Sandhu	Mixed doubles	Landers-Murphy / Coll (NZL); W 2–0	Webb / Maketu (PNG); W 2–0	—N/a	1 Q	Arnold / Adnan (MAS); W 2–0	King / Knight (NZL); L 1–2	Did Not Advance		

== Swimming ==
Men

Athlete	Event	Heat		Semifinal		Final	
Athlete	Event	Time	Rank	Time	Rank	Time	Rank
Prasanta Karmakar	100 m freestyle S9	1:04.86	4 Q	—N/a		1:04.73	4
Sajan Prakash	100 m butterfly	55.58	17	Did not advance			
Sajan Prakash	200 m freestyle	1:53.82	22	—N/a		Did not advance	
Sajan Prakash	400 m freestyle	3:59.29	20	—N/a		Did not advance	
Sandeep Sejwal	50 m breaststroke	28.17	10 Q	28.12	9	Did not advance	
Sandeep Sejwal	100 m breaststroke	1:02.97	12 Q	1:03.24	12	Did not advance	
Sharath Gayakwad	200 m individual medley SM8	2:41.56	4 Q	—N/a		2:37.17	4

== Table tennis ==
Singles

Athlete	Event	Group stage			Round of 64	Round of 32	Round of 16	Quarterfinal	Semifinal	Final / BM	
Athlete	Event	Opposition Score	Opposition Score	Rank	Opposition Score	Opposition Score	Opposition Score	Opposition Score	Opposition Score	Opposition Score	Rank
Harmeet Desai	Men's singles	Bye				Powell (AUS); W 4–3	Zhan J (SIN); L 0–4	Did Not Advance			
Soumyajit Ghosh	Men's singles	Bye				Thériault (CAN); W 4–0	Hu L (SIN); W 4–1	Pitchford (ENG); L 2–4	Did Not Advance		
Sharath Kamal	Men's singles	Bye				Robinson (NIR); W 4–0	Toriola (NGR); W 4–0	Drinkhall (ENG); W 4–1	Zhan J (SIN); L 0–4	Pitchford (ENG); L 2–4	4
Manika Batra	Women's singles	Bye				Yang (NZL); W 4–0	Luo (CAN); W 4–2	Lin Y (SIN); L 1–4	Did Not Advance		
Shamini Kumaresan	Women's singles	Bye				Ogundele (NGR); W 4–3	Yu My (SIN); L 1–4	Did Not Advance			
Madhurika Patkar	Women's singles	Bye				Madurangi (SRI); W 4–0	Jian F L (AUS); L 3–4	Did Not Advance			

Doubles

Athlete	Event	Round of 128	Round of 64	Round of 32	Round of 16	Quarterfinal	Semifinal	Final / BM	
Athlete	Event	Opposition Score	Opposition Score	Opposition Score	Opposition Score	Opposition Score	Opposition Score	Opposition Score	Rank
Anthony Amalraj; Sharath Kamal	Men's doubles	—N/a	Bye	Kalaluka / Ng'andu (ZAM); W 3–0	R Jenkins / S Jenkins (WAL); W 3–0	Reed / Walker (ENG); W 3–1	Yang Z / Zhan J (SIN); W 3–0	Ning G / Hu L (SIN); L 1–3	2nd place, silver medalist(s)
Harmeet Desai; Soumyajit Ghosh	Men's doubles	—N/a	Bye	Dookram / Wilson (TRI); W 3–0	McCreery / Robinson (NIR); W 3–1	Ning G / Hu L (SIN); L 1–3	Did Not Advance		
Ankita Das; Poulomi Ghatak	Women's doubles	—N/a	Bye	Edwards / Spicer (TRI); W 3–0	Beh L W / Sock K N (MAS); L 2–3	Did Not Advance			
Shamini Kumaresan; Madhurika Patkar	Women's doubles	—N/a	Bye	Lynch-Dawson / Ludlow (NIR); W 3–1	Dederko / Zhang (AUS); W 3–2	Drinkhall / Sibley (ENG); L 1–3	Did Not Advance		
Anthony Amalraj; Madhurika Patkar	Mixed doubles	Bye	Wilson / Spicer (TRI); W 3–0	St. Louis / Chung (TRI); W 3–1	Ning G / Lin Y (SIN); L 2–3	Did Not Advance			
Soumyajit Ghosh; Poulomi Ghatak	Mixed doubles	Bye	Khurshid / Sheikh (PAK); W 3–0	Walker / Le Fevre (ENG); L 2–3	Did Not Advance				
Sharath Kamal; Shamini Kumaresan	Mixed doubles	Bye	Mutambuze / Natunga (UGA); W 3–0	Leong C F / Ho Y (MAS); W 3–0	Powell / Jian F L (AUS); W 3–2	Reed / Sibley (ENG); L 2–3	Did Not Advance		
Sanil Shetty; Manika Batra	Mixed doubles	Bye	Farley / Felice (BAR); W 3–0	Liu Tt / Li (NZL); L 0–3	Did Not Advance				

Team

Athletes	Event	Group stage				Round of 16	Quarterfinal	Semifinal	Final / BM	
Athletes	Event	Opposition Score	Opposition Score	Opposition Score	Rank	Opposition Score	Opposition Score	Opposition Score	Opposition Score	Rank
Anthony Amalraj; Harmeet Desai; Soumyajit Ghosh; Sharath Kamal; Sanil Shetty	Men's team	Vanuatu; W 3–0	Northern Ireland; W 3–0	Guyana; W 3–0	1 Q	Malaysia; W 3–0	Scotland; W 3–0	England; L 1–3	Nigeria; L 1–3	4
Ankita Das; Manika Batra; Poulomi Ghatak; Shamini Kumaresan; Madhurika Patkar	Women's team	Barbados; W 3–0	Nigeria; W 3–1	Kenya; W 3–0	1 Q	Bye	New Zealand; W 3–0	Singapore; L 1–3	Australia; L 1–3	4

== Weightlifting ==
=== Weightlifting ===
Men

Athlete	Event	Result		Total	Rank
Athlete	Event	Snatch	Clean & Jerk	Total	Rank
Sukhen Dey	56 kg	109	139	248	1st place, gold medalist(s)
Ganesh Mali	56 kg	111	133	244	3rd place, bronze medalist(s)
Rustam Sarang	62 kg	118	145	263	7
Omkar Otari	69 kg	136	160	296	3rd place, bronze medalist(s)
Katulu Ravi Kumar	77 kg	142	175	317	2nd place, silver medalist(s)
Sathish Sivalingam	77 kg	149	179	328	1st place, gold medalist(s)
Vikas Thakur	85 kg	150	183	333	2nd place, silver medalist(s)
Chandrakant Mali	94 kg	150	188	338	3rd place, bronze medalist(s)

Women

Athlete	Event	Result		Total	Rank
Athlete	Event	Snatch	Clean & Jerk	Total	Rank
Khumukcham Sanjita Chanu	48 kg	77	96	173	1st place, gold medalist(s)
Saikhom Mirabai Chanu	48 kg	75	95	170	2nd place, silver medalist(s)
Swati Singh	53 kg	83	100	183	3rd place, bronze medalist(s)
Santoshi Matsa	53 kg	83	105	188	2nd place, silver medalist(s)
Meena Kumari	58 kg	83	111	194	5
Punam Yadav	63 kg	88	114	202	3rd place, bronze medalist(s)
Vandna Gupta	63 kg	91	107	198	4

Note: In the Women's 53 kg category India's Swati Singh won the bronze medal and Santoshi Matsa was upgraded to the silver medal after the gold medalist Chika Amalaha of Nigeria tested positive for sample A and also for sample B and was disqualified after the hearing that took place on Friday afternoon (1 August)

=== Powerlifting ===
Athlete	Event	Total lifted	Rank
Farman Basha	Men's Lightweight	DNF	
Rajinder Rahelu	Men's Heavyweight	180.5	2nd place, silver medalist(s)
Sakina Khatun	Women's Lightweight	88.2	3rd place, bronze medalist(s)

== Wrestling ==
Key:

- VT – Victory by Fall.
- PP – Decision by Points – the loser with technical points.
- PO – Decision by Points – the loser without technical points.

Men

Athlete	Event	Round of 16	Quarterfinal	Semifinal	Repechage	Final/BM	
Athlete	Event	Opposition Result	Opposition Result	Opposition Result	Opposition Result	Opposition Result	Rank
Amit Kumar	57 kg	Bandoo (MRI); W 5–0^{VT}	Masunyane (RSA); W 10–0^{PO}	Hussain (PAK); W 10–0^{PO}	—N/a	Welson (NGR); W 6–2^{PO}	1st place, gold medalist(s)
Bajrang Punia	61 kg	Madyarchyk (ENG); W 12–0^{PO}	Plaatjies (RSA); W 12–1^{PP}	Daniel (NGR); W 5–2^{VT}	—N/a	Tremblay (CAN); L 1–12^{PP}	2nd place, silver medalist(s)
Yogeshwar Dutt	65 kg	Gladkov (SCO); W 11–0^{PO}	Jones (SCO); W 10–0^{PO}	Perera (SRI); W 10–0^{VT}	—N/a	Balfour (CAN); W 10–0^{PO}	1st place, gold medalist(s)
Sushil Kumar	74 kg	Lawrence (AUS); W 11–0^{PO}	Sandrange (SRI); W 10–0^{PO}	Bibo (NGR); W 8–4^{PP}	—N/a	Abbas (PAK); W 6–2^{VT}	1st place, gold medalist(s)
Pawan Kumar	86 kg	Hill (NZL); W 10–0^{PO}	Bianco (SCO); W 5–0^{VT}	Tagziev (CAN); L 0–4^{VT}	Bye	Inam (PAK); W 6–6^{PP}	3rd place, bronze medalist(s)
Satyawart Kadian	97 kg	Arachchige (SRI); W 10–0^{PO}	Tamarau (NGR); W 6–2^{PP}	Rattigan (ENG); W 8–4^{PP}	—N/a	Gill (CAN); L 4–4^{PP}	2nd place, silver medalist(s)
Rajeev Tomar	125 kg	Bye	Boltic (NGR); W 12–2^{PP}	Carney (NZL); W 11–1^{PP}	—N/a	Jarvis (CAN); L 0–3^{PO}	2nd place, silver medalist(s)

Women
Repechage Format

Athlete	Event	Round of 16	Quarterfinal	Semifinal	Final/BM	
Athlete	Event	Opposition Result	Opposition Result	Opposition Result	Opposition Result	Rank
Vinesh Phogat	48 kg	—N/a	Nweke (NGR); W 7–1^{VT}	Mian (CAN); W 12–1^{PP}	Rattigan (ENG); W 11–8^{PP}	1st place, gold medalist(s)
Lalita Sehrawat	53 kg	—N/a	Madi (RSA); W 10–0^{PO}	Hawke (SCO); W 4–0^{VT}	Adekuoroye (NGR); L 0–2^{VT}	2nd place, silver medalist(s)
Babita Kumari	55 kg	—N/a	Marsh (SCO); W 13–2^{PP}	Porogovska (ENG); W 2–0^{VT}	Laverdure (CAN); W 9–2^{PP}	1st place, gold medalist(s)
Sakshi Malik	58 kg	Bye	Eyia (CMR); W 10–0^{PO}	Stone (CAN); W 8–5^{PP}	Adeniyi (NGR); L 0–10^{PO}	2nd place, silver medalist(s)
Geetika Jakhar	63 kg	Bye	Metala (CMR); W 8–2^{VT}	Connolly (WAL); W 13–2^{PP}	Lappage (CAN); L 0–7^{PO}	2nd place, silver medalist(s)
Navjot Kaur	69 kg	—N/a	Bye	Yeats (CAN); L 0–10^{PO}	Jones (SCO); W 13–0^{PO}	3rd place, bronze medalist(s)

Nordic Format

Athlete	Event	Nordic round robin				Rank
Athlete	Event	Opposition Result	Opposition Result	Opposition Result	Opposition Result	Rank
Jyoti	75 kg	Onyebuchi (NGR); L 0–8^{PO}	Edwards (ENG); W 13–2^{PP}	Ali (CMR); L 0–6^{PO}	Wiebe (CAN); L 0–9^{PO}	4
