= Weightlifting at the 2014 Commonwealth Games =

- Venue: Scottish Exhibition and Conference Centre
- Dates: 24 July – 2 August 2014
- Competitors: 270 from 38 nations

Weightlifting competitions at the 2014 Commonwealth Games in Glasgow, Scotland were held between 24 July and 2 August at the Scottish Exhibition and Conference Centre. Included with the weightlifting event were four powerlifting events for disabled athletes.

== Schedule ==
Date	Time	Event
Thursday 24 July	19:30	Men's 56 kg
Thursday 24 July	19:30	Women's 48 kg
Friday 25 July	19:30	Men's 62 kg
Friday 25 July	19:30	Women's 53 kg
Saturday 26 July	19:30	Men's 69 kg
Saturday 26 July	19:30	Women's 58 kg
Sunday 27 July	19:30	Men's 77 kg
Sunday 27 July	19:30	Women's 63 kg
Monday 28 July	19:30	Men's 85 kg
Monday 28 July	19:30	Women's 69 kg
Tuesday 29 July	19:30	Men's 94 kg
Tuesday 29 July	19:30	Women's 75 kg
Wednesday 30 July	19:30	Men's 105 kg
Wednesday 30 July	19:30	Women's +75 kg
Thursday 31 July	19:30	Men's +105 kg

== Medal table ==
Rank	Nation	Gold	Silver	Bronze	Total
1	India	3	5	6	14
2	Nigeria	2	6	1	9
3	Canada	2	0	2	4
4	Papua New Guinea	2	0	0	2
5	England	1	1	2	4
6	Malaysia	1	1	1	3
6	New Zealand	1	1	1	3
8	Cameroon	1	0	0	1
8	Cyprus	1	0	0	1
8	Kiribati	1	0	0	1
11	Samoa	0	2	1	3
12	Australia	0	1	2	3
13	Nauru	0	1	0	1
13	Sri Lanka	0	1	0	1
15	Fiji	0	0	1	1
15	Kenya	0	0	1	1
15	Wales	0	0	1	1
Totals (17 entries)		15	19	19	53

== Events ==
=== Men's events ===
Event	Gold	Silver	Bronze
56 kg	Sukhen Dey; India	Zulhelmi Md Pisol; Malaysia	Ganesh Mali; India
62 kg	Dimitris Minasidis; Cyprus	Sudesh Peiris; Sri Lanka	Vaipava Ioane; Samoa
69 kg	Mohd Hafifi Mansor; Malaysia	Yinka Ayenuwa; Nigeria	Omkar Otari; India
77 kg	Sathish Sivalingam; India	Katulu Ravi Kumar; India	François Etoundi; Australia
85 kg	Richie Patterson; New Zealand	Vikas Thakur; India	Pascal Plamondon; Canada
94 kg	Steven Kari; Papua New Guinea	Simplice Ribouem; Australia	Chandrakant Mali; India
105 kg	David Katoatau; Kiribati	Stanislav Chalaev; New Zealand	Ben Watson; England
+105 kg	George Kobaladze; Canada	Itte Detenamo; Nauru	Damon Kelly; Australia

=== Women's events ===
Event	Gold	Silver	Bronze
48 kg	Sanjita Khumukchan; India	Mirabai Chanu Saikhom; India	Nkechi Opara; Nigeria
53 kg *	Dika Toua; Papua New Guinea	Santoshi Matsa; India	Swati Singh; India
58 kg	Zoe Smith; England	Ndidi Winifred; Nigeria	Michaela Breeze; Wales
63 kg	Olauwatoyin Adesanmi; Nigeria	Obioma Okoli; Nigeria	Punam Yadav; India
69 kg	Marie Fegue; Cameroon	Itohan Ebireguesele; Nigeria	Marie-Josée Arès-Pilon; Canada
75 kg	Marie-Ève Beauchemin-Nadeau; Canada	Mary Opeloge; Samoa	Apolonia Vaivai; Fiji
+75 kg	Maryam Usman; Nigeria	Ele Opeloge; Samoa	Tracey Lambrechs; New Zealand

* The women's 53 kg competition was originally won by 16-year-old Chika Amalaha of Nigeria. Following a failed doping test, Amalaha was stripped of her medal and placement, and the medals were redistributed.

=== Powerlifting ===
Event	Gold	Silver	Bronze
Men's 72 kg	Paul Kehinde; Nigeria	Rolland Ezuruike; Nigeria	Ali Jawad; England
Men's +72 kg	Abdulazeez Ibrahim; Nigeria	Rajinder Rahelu; India	Jong Yee Khie; Malaysia
Women's 61 kg	Esther Oyema; Nigeria	Natalie Blake; England	Sakina Khatun; India
Women's +61 kg	Loveline Obiji; Nigeria	Bose Omolayo; Nigeria	Joyce Wambui Njuguna; Kenya

== Participating nations ==
- Australia (19)
- Bangladesh (4)
- Barbados (2)
- Cameroon (18)
- Canada (14)
- Cook Islands (1)
- Cyprus (3)
- England (17)
- Fiji (4)
- Ghana (10)
- India (19)
- Kenya (7)
- Kiribati (5)
- Malawi (2)
- Malaysia (14)
- Mauritius (4)
- Namibia (1)
- Nauru (4)
- New Zealand (12)
- Nigeria (21)
- Niue (6)
- Pakistan (5)
- Papua New Guinea (10)
- Rwanda (1)
- Samoa (12)
- Scotland (5)
- Seychelles (5)
- Singapore (2)
- Sierra Leone (2)
- Solomon Islands (4)
- South Africa (6)
- Sri Lanka (11)
- Tanzania (2)
- Tonga (3)
- Turks and Caicos Islands (2)
- Tuvalu (3)
- Uganda (4)
- Wales (6)
