= 2014 Commonwealth Games medal table =

Ranking of participants by medal total

The 2014 Commonwealth Games (officially known as the XX Commonwealth Games), was a multi-sport event held in Glasgow, Scotland from 23 July to 3 August 2014. It was the first time that Glasgow hosted the games, and the third time it was hosted in Scotland after Edinburgh hosted in 1970 and 1986. A total of 4,947 athletes from 71 Commonwealth Games Associations (CGAs) competed in 261 events in 17 sports.

Athletes from 37 participating CGAs won at least one medal; athletes from 21 CGAs won at least one gold medal. England led the medal table for the first time since 1986, winning 58 golds and 174 medals overall. Australia came second, after leading the medal table for the last six consecutive games, while Canada came third. Hosts Scotland enjoyed their best-ever performance by finishing in fourth place with a record 19 gold medals and 53 overall. Kiribati won its first-ever Commonwealth Games medal, a gold in the men's 105 kg weightlifting competition. Grenada won its first Commonwealth Games gold medal in the men's 400 metres. South African swimmer Chad le Clos won the most medals, a total of seven including two gold, one silver and four bronze. Canadian rhythmic gymnast Patricia Bezzoubenko won the most gold medals with five in addition to a bronze medal.

== Medal table ==
The ranking in this table is consistent with International Olympic Committee convention in its published medal tables. By default, the table is ordered by the number of gold medals the athletes from a nation have won (in this context, a "nation" is an entity represented by a Commonwealth Games Association). The number of silver medals is taken into consideration next and then the number of bronze medals. If nations are still tied, equal ranking is given and they are listed alphabetically by their three-letter country code.

Two bronze medals were awarded in boxing, judo and wrestling, except for Women's freestyle 75 kg as only five competitors were entered in the event. Additionally, two bronze medals were awarded in the men's 100 m backstroke and women's pole vault as a result of a tie between two athletes. No bronze medal was awarded in the men's synchronized 10 metre platform as only four teams competed in the event. Therefore, the total number of bronze medals is greater than the total number of gold or silver medals.

* Host nation (Scotland)

2014 Commonwealth Games medal table
Rank	CGA	Gold	Silver	Bronze	Total
1	England	58	59	57	174
2	Australia	49	42	46	137
3	Canada	32	16	34	82
4	Scotland*	19	15	19	53
5	India	15	30	19	64
6	New Zealand	14	14	17	45
7	South Africa	13	10	17	40
8	Nigeria	11	11	14	36
9	Kenya	10	10	5	25
10	Jamaica	10	4	8	22
11	Singapore	8	5	4	17
12	Malaysia	6	7	6	19
13	Wales	5	11	20	36
14	Cyprus	2	4	2	8
15	Northern Ireland	2	3	7	12
16	Papua New Guinea	2	0	0	2
17	Cameroon	1	3	3	7
18	Uganda	1	0	4	5
19	Grenada	1	0	1	2
20	Botswana	1	0	0	1
20	Kiribati	1	0	0	1
22	Trinidad and Tobago	0	3	5	8
23	Pakistan	0	3	1	4
24	Bahamas	0	2	1	3
24	Samoa	0	2	1	3
26	Namibia	0	1	2	3
27	Mauritius	0	1	1	2
27	Mozambique	0	1	1	2
29	Bangladesh	0	1	0	1
29	Isle of Man	0	1	0	1
29	Nauru	0	1	0	1
29	Sri Lanka	0	1	0	1
33	Ghana	0	0	2	2
33	Zambia	0	0	2	2
35	Barbados	0	0	1	1
35	Fiji	0	0	1	1
35	Saint Lucia	0	0	1	1
Totals (37 entries)		261	261	302	824

== Changes in medal standings ==
=== Weightlifting ===
The women's 53 kg competition was originally won by 16-year-old Chika Amalaha of Nigeria. Following a failed doping test, Amalaha was stripped of her medal and placement, and the medals were redistributed. Dika Toua of Papua New Guinea was awarded the gold, Santoshi Matsa of India, silver and Swati Singh, also of India, bronze.
