= Nigeria at the 2014 Commonwealth Games =

- CGF code: NGR
- CGA: Nigeria Olympic Committee
- Website: www.nigeriaolympiccommittee.org

in Glasgow, Scotland
- Flag bearer: Maryam Usman
- Medals Ranked 8th: Gold 11 Silver 11 Bronze 14 Total 36

Commonwealth Games appearances (overview)
- 1950; 1954; 1958; 1962; 1966; 1970; 1974; 1978; 1982; 1986; 1990; 1994; 1998; 2002; 2006; 2010; 2014; 2018; 2022; 2026; 2030

Nigeria competed in the 2014 Commonwealth Games in Glasgow, Scotland from 23 July – 3 August 2014.

== Athletics ==
Men

Athlete	Event	Round 1		Semifinal		Final	
Athlete	Event	Result	Rank	Result	Rank	Result	Rank
Monzavous Edwards	100 m	10.40	2 Q	10.30	7	Did not advance	
Ogho-Oghene Egwero	100 m	10.38	2 Q	10.40	8	Did not advance	
Mark Jelks	100 m	10.28	1 Q	10.13 =SB	3 q	10.17	5
Obinna Metu	200 m	21.19	4	Did not advance			
Adeseye Ogunlewe	200 m	21.11 PB	4	Did not advance			
Noah Akwu	400 m	Disqualified		Did not advance			
Salihu Isah	400 m	47.51	4	Did not advance			
Robert Simmons	400 m	Did not finish		Did not advance			
Sean Obinwa	800 m	1:50.59	5	Did not advance			
Tyron Akins	110 metres hurdles	13.75	4	—N/a		Did not advance	
Alex Al-Ameen	110 metres hurdles	13.71	3 Q	—N/a		13.77	7
Martins Ogieriakhi	110 metres hurdles	14.13	6	—N/a		Did not advance	
Cristian Morton	400 metres hurdles	49.62	3 Q	—N/a		49.65	5
Pgho-Oghene Egwero (Heat Only); Mozavous Edwards; Obinna Metu; Mark Jelks; Ejowvokoghene Oduduru (Final Only)	4 x 100 metres relay	39.11	2 Q	—N/a		40.17	6
Saihu Isah; Robert Simmons (Heat Only); Noah Akwu; Orukpe Erayokan (Heat Only); Miles Ukaoma (Final Only); Cristian Morton (Final Only)	4 x 400 metres relay	3:06.66	2 Q	—N/a		3:04.86	7

Athlete	Event	Qualification		Final	
Athlete	Event	Distance	Rank	Distance	Rank
Samson Idiata	Long jump	7.57	14	Did not advance	
Hammed Suleman	Long jump	No Mark		Did not advance	
Tosin Oke	Triple jump	16.75 SB	1 Q	16.84 SB	2nd place, silver medalist(s)
Olu Olamigoke	Triple jump	16.46	5 Q	16.56	4
Stephen Mozia	Shot put	17.76	14	Did not advance	
Kenechukwu Ezeofor	Javelin throw	65.71	19	Did not advance	
Sunday Ezeh	Discus throw (F42/44)	—N/a		44.89 PB	6
Richard Okigbazi	Discus throw (F42/44)	—N/a		39.28 PB	3rd place, bronze medalist(s)

Women

Athlete	Event	Round 1		Semifinal		Final	
Athlete	Event	Result	Rank	Result	Rank	Result	Rank
Gloria Asumnu	100 m	11.43	2 Q	11.25 SB	2 Q	11.41	8
Blessing Okagbare	100 m	11.20	1 Q	10.93 SB	1 Q	10.85 GR	1st place, gold medalist(s)
Justinah Sule	100 m	12.00	6	Did not advance			
Blessing Okagbare	200 m	22.99	1 Q	22.43	1 Q	22.25	1st place, gold medalist(s)
Folashade Abugan	400 m	52.84	2 Q	51.78 SB	3 q	52.33	5
Regina George	400 m	53.92	2 Q	53.48	6	Did not advance	
Omolara Omotosho	400 m	53.02	2 Q	52.34	3	Did not advance	
Nichole Denby	100 metres hurdles	13.54	3	—N/a		Did not advance	
Ugonna Ndu	100 metres hurdles	13.35	5	—N/a		Did not advance	
Amaka Ogoegbunam	400 metres hurdles	56.85	3 q	—N/a		Disqualified	
Gloria Asumnu; Patience Okon George (Heat Only); Dominique Duncan; Lawretta Ozoh; Blessing Okagbare (Final Only)	4 x 100 metres relay	44.13	1 Q	—N/a		42.92	2nd place, silver medalist(s)
Oluwafunke Oladoye (Heat Only); Omolara Omotosho (Heat Only); Regina George; Ada Benjamin; Patience Okon George (Final Only); Folashade Abugan (Final Only)	4 x 400 metres relay	3:28.28	2 Q	—N/a		3:24.71	2nd place, silver medalist(s)

Athlete	Event	Qualification		Final	
Athlete	Event	Distance	Position	Distance	Position
Ese Brume	Long jump	6.29	12 q	6.56	1st place, gold medalist(s)
Latifat Balogun	Long jump (F37/38)	—N/a		3.54	10
Igolukumo Ekioukeowei	Long jump (F37/38)	—N/a		2.37	11
Nwanneka Okwelogu	Shot put	—N/a		15.13 PB	9
Queen Obisesan	Hammer throw	57.16	13	Did not advance	

== Shooting ==
Women
Pistol/Small bore

Athlete	Event	Qualification		Final	
Athlete	Event	Points	Rank	Points	Rank
Yetunde Olabode	10 metre air pistol	Did not start		Did not advance	
Adaeze Eziuzor	10 m air rifle	Did not start		Did not advance	
Caroline Utho	10 m air rifle	Did not start		Did not advance	
Nora Ekpenyong	25 m pistol	Did not start		Did not advance	
Ada Ikevude	25 m pistol	Did not start		Did not advance	
Evelyn Ebbey-Esugo	50 m rifle prone	Did not start		Did not advance	
Caroline Utho	50 m rifle prone	Did not start		Did not advance	
Patience Unuigbe	50 m rifle 3 positions	Did not start		Did not advance	

Men
Pistol/Small bore

Athlete	Event	Qualification		Final	
Athlete	Event	Points	Rank	Points	Rank
Sesan Abolarin	10 m air rifle	Did not start		Did not advance	
Okposo Esugo	10 m air rifle	Did not start		Did not advance	
Elaochi Adoyi	10 m air pistol	Did not start		Did not advance	
Samuel Effiong	10 m air pistol	Did not start		Did not advance	
Madu Abdul	25 m rapid fire pistol	Did not start		Did not advance	
Kingsley Okereke	25 m rapid fire pistol	Did not start		Did not advance	
Charles Adewumni	50 m rifle prone	Did not start		Did not advance	
Akeem Animasaun	50 m rifle prone	Did not start		Did not advance	
Sesan Abolarin	50 m rifle 3 positions	Did not start		Did not advance	
Barau Waziri	50 m rifle 3 positions	Did not start		Did not advance	

== Weightlifting ==
Men

Athlete	Event	Snatch	Clean & jerk	Total	Rank
Rasag Tanimowo	56 kg	95	130	225	6
King Kalu	62 kg	105	140	245	14
Yinka Ayenuwa	69 kg	130	171	301	2nd place, silver medalist(s)
Mamdum Seldum	77 kg	138	Did not finish		
Gideon Aigbefoh	85 kg	147	177	324	4
Olusola Friday	94 kg	150	Did not finish		
Dung Williams	+105 kg	135	170	305	11

Women

Athlete	Event	Snatch	Clean & jerk	Total	Rank
Nkechi Opara	48 kg	70	92	162	3rd place, bronze medalist(s)
Chika Amalaha	53 kg	DSQ			
Ndidi Winifred	58 kg	90	116	206	2nd place, silver medalist(s)
Olauwatoyin Adesanmi	63 kg	92	115	207	1st place, gold medalist(s)
Obioma Okoli	63 kg	90	117	207	2nd place, silver medalist(s)
Itohan Ebireguesele	69 kg	100	122	222	2nd place, silver medalist(s)
Maryam Usman	+75 kg	125	155	280	1st place, gold medalist(s)

Powerlifting

Athlete	Event	Total	Rank
Rolland Ezuruike	Men's 72 kg	220.2	2nd place, silver medalist(s)
Paul Kehinde	Men's 72 kg	221	1st place, gold medalist(s)
Abdulazeez Ibrahim	Men's +72 kg	197	1st place, gold medalist(s)
Esther Oyema	Women's 61 kg	136	1st place, gold medalist(s)
Loveline Obiji	Women's +61 kg	122.4	1st place, gold medalist(s)
Bose Omolayo	Women's +61 kg	113.4	2nd place, silver medalist(s)

=== Controversy ===
The youngest female athlete to win a gold medal, Chika Amalaha, failed a dope test and was suspended following her win in the Weightlifting at the 2014 Commonwealth Games – Women's 53 kg.

== Wrestling ==
Men's freestyle

Athlete	Event	Round of 32	Round of 16	Quarterfinal	Semifinal	Repechage	Final / BM	
Athlete	Event	Opposition Result	Opposition Result	Opposition Result	Opposition Result	Opposition Result	Opposition Result	Rank
Ebikweminomo Welson	−57 kg	—N/a	Bye	Tafail (ENG); W 10-0	Pilling (WAL); W 10-0	—N/a	Kumar (IND); L 6-2	2nd place, silver medalist(s)
Amas Daniel	−61 kg	—N/a	Wahab (PAK); W 11-0	Thongsinh (NZL); W 11-0	Kumar (IND); L 2-5	—N/a	Madyarchyk (ENG); W 14-4	3rd place, bronze medalist(s)
Sampson Clarkson	−65 kg	—N/a	Balfour (CAN); L 1-3	Did not advance		Salman (PAK); W 3–2	Rensburg (RSA); W 8-0	3rd place, bronze medalist(s)
Melvin Bibo	−74 kg	Laverick (CAN); W 14-4	Bangura (SLE); W 8-0	Hawthorn (WAL); W 12-0	Kumar (IND); L 8-4	—N/a	Lawrence (AUS); W 4-0	3rd place, bronze medalist(s)
Andrew Dick	−86 kg	—N/a	Bye	Omenda (KEN); W 10-0	Hietbrink (RSA); W 10-0	—N/a	Tagziev (CAN); L 4-14	2nd place, silver medalist(s)
Soso Tamarau	−97 kg	—N/a	Koru (KIR); W 10-0	Kadian (IND); L 2-6	Did not advance	Arachchige (SRI); W 6-0	Rattigan (ENG); L 2-12	5
Sinivie Boltic	−125 kg	—N/a	Bye	Tomar (IND); L 2-12	Did not advance			

Women's freestyle

Athlete	Event	Round of 16	Quarterfinal	Semifinal	Repechage	Final / BM	
Athlete	Event	Opposition Result	Opposition Result	Opposition Result	Opposition Result	Opposition Result	Rank
Rosemary Nweke	−48 kg	—N/a	Vinesh (IND); L 1-7	Did not advance	—N/a	Mian (CAN); L 2-13	5
Odunayo Adekuoroye	−53 kg	—N/a	Gallays (CAN); W 11-0	Lemofack Letchidji (CMR); W 10-0	—N/a	Sehrawat (IND); W 2-0	1st place, gold medalist(s)
Ifeoma Nwoye	−55 kg	—N/a	Coetzer (RSA); W 13-2	Laverdure (CAN); L 6-4	—N/a	Essombe Tiako (CMR); W 6-0	3rd place, bronze medalist(s)
Aminat Adeniyi	−58 kg	Bye	Grundy (ENG); W 10-0	Ford (NZL); W 11-1	—N/a	Malik (IND); W 10-0	1st place, gold medalist(s)
Blessing Oborududu	−63 kg	Bye	Lappage (CAN); L 3-6	Did not advance	—N/a	Spiteri (ENG); W 11-2	3rd place, bronze medalist(s)
Hannah Rueben	−69 kg	—N/a	Tomo (CMR); L 9-18	Did not advance	—N/a	Molongwana (RSA); W 12-2	3rd place, bronze medalist(s)

Athlete	Event	Nordic 1	Nordic 2	Nordic 3	Nordic 4	Standings
Athlete	Event	Opposition Result	Opposition Result	Opposition Result	Opposition Result	Rank
Blessing Onyebuchi	−75 kg	Edwards (ENG); W 10–0	Wiebe (CAN); L 2–12	Ali (CMR); L 1–10	Jyoti (IND); W 8–0	3rd place, bronze medalist(s)
