= Badminton at the 2014 Commonwealth Games – Women's singles =

Badminton – Women's singles at the 2014 Commonwealth Games
- Venue: Emirates Arena, Glasgow
- Dates: 29 July – 3 August 2014
- Competitors: 50 from 28 nations

Medalists
gold medal	Michelle Li	Canada
silver medal	Kirsty Gilmour	Scotland
bronze medal	P. V. Sindhu	India

The women's singles badminton event at the 2014 Commonwealth Games took place between July 29 and August 3 at the Emirates Arena in Glasgow. The defending Commonwealth Games Games champion was Saina Nehwal of India, but did not compete in this year's games, after withdrawing due to injury.

== Seeds ==
The seeds for the tournament were:

1. Saina Nehwal (IND) (withdrew)
2. P. V. Sindhu (IND) (bronze medalist)
3. Kirsty Gilmour (SCO) (silver medalist)
4. Michelle Li (CAN) (gold medalist)
5. Tee Jing Yi (MAS) (fourth place)
6. P. C. Thulasi (IND) (quarterfinals)
7. Michelle Chan (NZL) (quarterfinals)
8. Sarah Walker (ENG) (quarterfinals)

== Results ==
=== Finals ===
Quarterfinals
2	P. V. Sindhu (IND)	21	21
Anna Rankin (NZL)	10	9
4	Michelle Li (CAN)	21	21
8	Sarah Walker (ENG)	18	18
6	P. C. Thulasi (IND)	21	19	19
5	Tee Jing Yi (MAS)	18	21	21
7	Michelle Chan (NZL)	9	10
3	Kirsty Gilmour (SCO)	21	21

Semifinals
2	P. V. Sindhu (IND)	20	20
4	Michelle Li (CAN)	22	22
5	Tee Jing Yi (MAS)	13	19
3	Kirsty Gilmour (SCO)	21	21

Final
4	Michelle Li (CAN)	21	21
3	Kirsty Gilmour (SCO)	14	7
Third place
2	P. V. Sindhu (IND)	23	21
5	Tee Jing Yi (MAS)	21	9

=== Top half ===
==== Section 1 ====
Round of 64
Sandra Le Grange (RSA)	21	21
Daisy Nakalyango (UGA)	14	13
Terry Gray (NFI)	w/o
Teitiria Utimawa (KIR)
Cristen Marritt (IOM)	21	21
Nicola Chan Lam (MRI)	15	18
Gayle Lloyd (GUE)	21	21
Evelyn Botwe (GHA)	15	19

Round of 32
2	P. V. Sindhu (IND)	21	21
Sandra Le Grange (RSA)	4	6
Thilini Hendahewa (SRI)	21	21
Terry Gray (NFI)	3	1
Anna Rankin (NZL)	21	21
Cristen Marritt (IOM)	14	11
Mercy Joseph (KEN)	21	21
Gayle Lloyd (GUE)	14	19

Round of 16
2	P. V. Sindhu (IND)	21	21
Thilini Hendahewa (SRI)	14	14
Anna Rankin (NZL)	21	21
Mercy Joseph (KEN)	5	13

Quarterfinals
2	P. V. Sindhu (IND)	21	21
Anna Rankin (NZL)	10	9

==== Section 2 ====
Round of 64
Palwasha Bashir (PAK)	21	19	21
Juliette Ah-Wan (SEY)	15	21	15
Kate Foo Kune (MRI)	4	3
Liang Xiaoyu (SIN)	21	21
Shari Watson (BAR)	21	21
Laura Minto (FAI)	12	11
Ruth Williams (JAM)	21	21
Maisa Ismail (MDV)	16	14
Elizabeth Cann (JER)	21	21
Alannah Stephenson (NIR)	16	11

Round of 32
4	Michelle Li (CAN)	21	21
Palwasha Bashir (PAK)	9	4
Diana Archer (GHA)	4	2
Liang Xiaoyu (SIN)	21	21
8	Sarah Walker (ENG)	21	21
Shari Watson (BAR)	14	5
Ruth Williams (JAM)	5	13
Elizabeth Cann (JER)	21	21

Round of 16
4	Michelle Li (CAN)	21	21
Liang Xiaoyu (SIN)	16	16
8	Sarah Walker (ENG)	21	17	21
Elizabeth Cann (JER)	14	21	18

Quarterfinals
4	Michelle Li (CAN)	21	21
8	Sarah Walker (ENG)	18	18

=== Bottom half ===
==== Section 3 ====
Round of 64
Tinabora Tekeiaki (KIR)
Rachel Honderich (CAN)	w/o
Solen Pasturel (JER)	21	21
Lavina Martins (KEN)	13	5
Joanne Snell (NFI)	3	5
Sinead Chambers (NIR)	21	21
Geordine Henry (JAM)	21	21
Sofia Arkhipkina (FAI)	4	3
Margaret Nankabirwa (UGA)	8	9
Elme de Villiers (RSA)	21	21

Round of 32
Rachel Honderich (CAN)	21	21
Solen Pasturel (JER)	7	14
Sinead Chambers (NIR)	10	2
6	P. C. Thulasi (IND)	21	21
Geordine Henry (JAM)	10	14
Nadeesha Murukkuwadura (SRI)	21	21
Elme de Villiers (RSA)	12	13
5	Tee Jing Yi (MAS)	21	21

Round of 16
Rachel Honderich (CAN)	12	7
6	P. C. Thulasi (IND)	21	21
Nadeesha Murukkuwadura (SRI)	9	6
5	Tee Jing Yi (MAS)	21	21

Quarterfinals
6	P. C. Thulasi (IND)	21	19	19
5	Tee Jing Yi (MAS)	18	21	21

==== Section 4 ====
Round of 64
Carissa Turner (WAL)	21	21
Sheila Muthoni (KEN)	6	1
Elena Johnson (GUE)	21	14	21
Kimberley Clague (IOM)	15	21	13
Achini Rathnasiri (SRI)	21	21
Aishath Rasheed (MDV)	11	12
6	Yeldy Louison (MRI)	21	21
Stella Amasah (GHA)	14	14
Mariama Eastmond (BAR)	3	13
Verdet Kessler (AUS)	21	21

Round of 32
Carissa Turner (WAL)	21	21
Elena Johnson (GUE)	14	10
Achini Rathnasiri (SRI)	21	7	12
7	Michelle Chan (NZL)	17	21	21
Yeldy Louison (MRI)	15	21	21
Allisen Camille (SEY)	21	14	19
Verdet Kessler (AUS)	14	5
3	Kirsty Gilmour (SCO)	21	21

Round of 16
Carissa Turner (WAL)	10	11
7	Michelle Chan (NZL)	21	21
Yeldy Louison (MRI)	4	6
3	Kirsty Gilmour (SCO)	21	21

Quarterfinals
7	Michelle Chan (NZL)	9	10
3	Kirsty Gilmour (SCO)	21	21
