= Falkland Islands at the 2014 Commonwealth Games =

- Flag of the Falkland Islands
- CGF code: FLK
- CGA: Falkland Islands Overseas Games Association
- Website: fioga.co.fk

in Glasgow, Scotland
- Competitors: 24 in 3 sports
- Flag bearer: Mike Brownlee
- Medals: Gold 0 Silver 0 Bronze 0 Total 0

Commonwealth Games appearances (overview)
- 1982; 1986; 1990; 1994; 1998; 2002; 2006; 2010; 2014; 2018; 2022; 2026; 2030

The Falkland Islands was represented at the 2014 Commonwealth Games in Glasgow by 25 athletes across three sports, badminton, shooting, and lawn bowls, the largest ever Falkland Islands squad to be sent to the Commonwealth Games.

== Badminton ==
Singles

Athlete	Event	Round of 64	Round of 32	Round of 16	Quarterfinals	Semifinals	Final	Rank
Athlete	Event	Opposition Score	Opposition Score	Opposition Score	Opposition Score	Opposition Score	Opposition Score	Rank
Douglas Clark	Men's Singles	Malcouzanne (SEY); L 0 - 2	did not advance					
Dominic Jaffray	Men's Singles	Huang (SIN); L 0 - 2	did not advance					
Ross Stewart	Men's Singles	Donkor (GHA); L 0 - 2	did not advance					
Sofia Arkhipkina	Women's Singles	Henry (JAM); L 0 - 2	did not advance					
Laura Minto	Women's Singles	Watson (BAR); L 0 - 2	did not advance					

Doubles

Athlete	Event	Round of 64	Round of 32	Round of 16	Quarterfinals	Semifinals	Final	Rank
Athlete	Event	Opposition Score	Opposition Score	Opposition Score	Opposition Score	Opposition Score	Opposition Score	Rank
Douglas Clark; Ross Stewart	Men's Doubles	Bye	England; L 0 - 2	did not advance				
Christopher Eynon; Dominic Jaffray	Men's Doubles	Seychelles; L 0 - 2	did not advance					
Laura Minto; Louise Williams	Women's Doubles	—	Sri Lanka; L 0 - 2	did not advance				
Sofia Arkhipkina; Anna Luxton	Women's Doubles	—	Seychelles; L 0 - 2	did not advance				
Dominic Jaffray; Louise Williams	Mixed Doubles	New Zealand; L 0 - 2	did not advance					
Douglas Clark; Anna Luxton	Mixed Doubles	Ghana; L 0 - 2	did not advance					
Ross Stewart; Laura Minto	Mixed Doubles	Bye	Australia; L 0 - 2	did not advance				
Christopher Eynon; Sofia Arkhipkina	Mixed Doubles	Pakistan; L 0 - 2	did not advance					

Mixed team

Pool D

Pos	Team	Pld	W	L	GF	GA	GD	PF	PA	PD	Pts	Qualification
1	Canada	3	3	0	25	6	+19	626	386	+240	3	Quarterfinals
2	Australia	3	2	1	23	8	+15	596	412	+184	2	Quarterfinals
3	Wales	3	1	2	14	18	−4	556	494	+62	1	
4	Falkland Islands	3	0	3	0	30	−30	144	630	−486	0	

Source: glasgow2014.com

Canada
5
Commonwealth Arena, Glasgow
24 July

Falkland Islands
0

			1	2	3
1	(Canada) (Falkland Islands)	Adrian Liu / Derrick Ng; Dominic Jaffray / Christopher Eynon	21; 6	21; 5
2	(Canada) (Falkland Islands)	Michelle Li; Laura Minto	21; 4	21; 2
3	(Canada) (Falkland Islands)	Andrew D'Souza; Douglas Clark	21; 3	21; 7
4	(Canada) (Falkland Islands)	Alex Bruce / Phyllis Chan; Sofia Arkhipkina / Anna Luxton	21; 0	21; 4
5	(Canada) (Falkland Islands)	Toby Ng / Rachel Honderich; Ross Stewart / Laura Minto	21; 7	21; 5

Australia
5
Commonwealth Arena, Glasgow
25 July

Falkland Islands
0

			1	2	3
1	(Australia) (Falkland Islands)	Raymond Tam / Gronya Somerville; Douglas Clark / Anna Luxton	21; 7	21; 7
2	(Australia) (Falkland Islands)	Jeff Tho; Dominic Jaffray	21; 6	21; 2
3	(Australia) (Falkland Islands)	Verdet Kessler; Laura Minto	21; 4	21; 3
4	(Australia) (Falkland Islands)	Raymond Tam / Glenn Warfe; Douglas Clark / Ross Stewart	21; 8	21; 10
5	(Australia) (Falkland Islands)	Gronya Somerville / Jacqueline Guan; Laura Minto / Louise Williams	21; 4	21; 4

Falkland Islands
0
Commonwealth Arena, Glasgow
25 July

Wales
5

			1	2	3
1	(Falkland Islands) (Wales)	Douglas Clark / Anna Luxton; Sarah Thomas / Oliver Gwilt	6; 21	11; 21
2	(Falkland Islands) (Wales)	Ross Stewart; Daniel Font	6; 21	5; 21
3	(Falkland Islands) (Wales)	Sofia Arkhipkina; Carissa Turner	2; 21	1; 21
4	(Falkland Islands) (Wales)	Dominic Jaffray / Christopher Enyon; Joe Morgan / Nicolas Strange	4; 21	5; 21
5	(Falkland Islands) (Wales)	Sofia Arkhipkina / Anna Luxton; Sarah Thomas / Carissa Turner	4; 21	2; 21

== Lawn Bowls ==
Men

Athlete	Event	Group Stage		Quarterfinal	Semifinal	Final	Rank
Athlete	Event	Opposition Score	Rank	Opposition Score	Opposition Score	Opposition Score	Rank
Michael Reive; Patrick Morrison; Barry Ford	Triples	England; L 8 - 31; Australia; L 5 - 23; Malaysia; L 8 - 31; Papua New Guinea; W 17 - 12; Pakistan; W 23 - 15	4	did not advance			
Gerald Reive; Michael Reive; Patrick Morrison; Barry Ford	Fours	Canada; L 6 - 16; India; L 6 - 22; South Africa; L 5 - 40; Namibia; W 12 - 11	4	did not advance			

== Shooting ==
Men

Athlete	Event	Qualification		Semifinals		Final	
Athlete	Event	Points	Rank	Points	Rank	Points	Rank
Michael Goss	50 metre rifle prone	DNS		—		did not advance	
Jeremy Poncet	50 metre rifle prone	486.4	38	—		did not advance	
Nevin Middleton	10 metre air pistol	523	27	—		did not advance	
Muarry Middeton	10 metre air pistol	498	29	—		did not advance	
Saul Pitaluga	Trap	92	28	did not advance			
Shaun Jaffray	Trap	73	36	did not advance			
Shaun Jaffray	Double trap	52	18	did not advance			
Axel Rodriguez-Reid	Double trap	80	14	did not advance			
Matthew Vincent	Skeet	75	26	did not advance			

Open

Athlete	Event	Day 1		Day 2		Day 3		Total	
Athlete	Event	Points	Rank	Points	Rank	Points	Rank	Overall	Rank
Derek Goodwin	Queen's prize individual	96		145		133		374	25
Gareth Goodwin	Queen's prize individual	96		143		119		358	31
Derek Goodwin; Gareth Goodwin	Queen's prize pairs	281	16	255	15	—		536	16
