= Badminton at the 2014 Commonwealth Games – Women's doubles =

Badminton – Women's doubles at the 2014 Commonwealth Games
- Venue: Emirates Arena, Glasgow
- Dates: 29 July – 3 August 2014
- Competitors: 60 from 24 nations

Medalists
gold medal	Vivian Hoo; Woon Khe Wei	Malaysia
silver medal	Ashwini Ponnappa; Jwala Gutta	India
bronze medal	Gabby Adcock; Lauren Smith	England

The women's doubles badminton event at the 2014 Commonwealth Games took place between July 29 and August 3 at the Emirates Arena in Glasgow.

== Seeds ==
The seeds for the tournament were:

1. Shinta Mulia Sari (SIN) / Yao Lei (SIN) (Quarterfinals)
2. Vivian Hoo (MAS) / Woon Khe Wei (MAS) (gold medalists)
3. Jwala Gutta (IND) / Ashwini Ponnappa (IND) (Finals, silver medalists)
4. Gabby Adcock (ENG) / Lauren Smith (ENG) (Semifinals, bronze medalists)

== Draw ==
=== Key ===
- INV = Tripartite invitation
- IP = ITF place
- Alt = Alternate
- w/o = Walkover
- r = Retired
- d = Defaulted

=== Finals ===
Quarterfinals
1	Shinta Mulia Sari (SIN); Yao Lei (SIN)	21	20	19
Lim Yin Loo (MAS); Lai Pei Jing (MAS)	19	22	21
3	Jwala Gutta (IND); Ashwini Ponnappa (IND)	21	21
Achini Rathnasiri (SRI); Upuli Weerasinghe (SRI)	10	9
Alex Bruce (CAN); Phyllis Chan (CAN)	9	10
4	Gabby Adcock (ENG); Lauren Smith (ENG)	21	21
Jennifer Fry (RSA); Sandra le Grange (RSA)	7	10
2	Vivian Hoo (MAS); Woon Khe Wei (MAS)	21	21

Semifinals
Lim Yin Loo (MAS); Lai Pei Jing (MAS)	7	12
3	Jwala Gutta (IND); Ashwini Ponnappa (IND)	21	21
4	Gabby Adcock (ENG); Lauren Smith (ENG)	16	11
2	Vivian Hoo (MAS); Woon Khe Wei (MAS)	21	21

Final
3	Jwala Gutta (IND); Ashwini Ponnappa (IND)	17	21
2	Vivian Hoo (MAS); Woon Khe Wei (MAS)	21	23
Third place
Lim Yin Loo (MAS); Lai Pei Jing (MAS)	21	15	16
4	Gabby Adcock (ENG); Lauren Smith (ENG)	16	21	21

=== Top half ===
==== Section 1 ====
Round of 32
Kimberly Helen Clague (IOM); Cristen Elizabeth Marritt (IOM)	21	21
Geordine Henry (JAM); Ruth Williams (JAM)	12	15
Heather Olver (ENG); Kate Robertshaw (ENG)	21	21
Daisy Nakalyango (UGA); Margaret Nankabirwa (UGA)	3	6
Elena Johnson (GUE); Gayle Lloyd (GUE)	6	10
Lim Yin Loo (MAS); Lai Pei Jing (MAS)	21	21

Round of 16
1	Shinta Mulia Sari (SIN); Yao Lei (SIN)	21	21
Kimberly Helen Clague (IOM); Cristen Elizabeth Marritt (IOM)	13	11
Heather Olver (ENG); Kate Robertshaw (ENG)	15	18
Lim Yin Loo (MAS); Lai Pei Jing (MAS)	21	21

Quarterfinals
1	Shinta Mulia Sari (SIN); Yao Lei (SIN)	21	20	19
Lim Yin Loo (MAS); Lai Pei Jing (MAS)	19	22	21

==== Section 2 ====
Round of 32
3	Jwala Gutta (IND); Ashwini Ponnappa (IND)	X	X	X
Tinabora Tekeiaki (KIR); Teitira Utimawa (KIR)	w/o	w/o	w/o
Terry Gray (NFI); Joanne Snell (NFI)	2	3
Tang He Tian (AUS); Renuga Veeran (AUS)	21	21
Laura Minto (FAI); Louise Williams (FAI)	6	5
Achini Rathnasiri (SRI); Upuli Weerasinghe (SRI)	21	21
Stella Amasah (GHA); Evelyn Botwe (GHA)	10	3
Anna Rankin (NZL); Madeleine Stapleton (NZL)	21	21

Round of 16
3	Jwala Gutta (IND); Ashwini Ponnappa (IND)	18	21	21
Tang He Tian (AUS); Renuga Veeran (AUS)	21	10	6
Achini Rathnasiri (SRI); Upuli Weerasinghe (SRI)	22	18	21
Anna Rankins (NZL); Madeleine Stapleton (NZL)	20	21	19

Quarterfinals
3	Jwala Gutta (IND); Ashwini Ponnappa (IND)	21	21
Achini Rathnasiri (SRI); Upuli Weerasinghe (SRI)	10	9

=== Bottom half ===
==== Section 3 ====
Round of 32
Mercy Joseph (KEN); Lavina Martins (KEN)	6	8
Alex Bruce (CAN); Phyllis Chan (CAN)	21	21
Sarah Thomas (WAL); Carissa Turner (WAL)	18	22	21
Jacqueline Guan (AUS); Gronya Somerville (AUS)	21	20	17
Caroline Black (NIR); Sinead Chambers (NIR)	11	15
Fu Mingtian (SIN); Vanessa Neo (SIN)	21	21
Imogen Bankier (SCO); Kirsty Gilmour (SCO)	13	21	18
4	Gabby Adcock (ENG); Lauren Smith (ENG)	21	17	21

Round of 16
Alex Bruce (CAN); Phyllis Chan (CAN)	23	21
Sarah Thomas (WAL); Carissa Turner (WAL)	21	13
Fu Mingtian (SIN); Vanessa Neo (SIN)	18	12
4	Gabby Adcock (ENG); Lauren Smith (ENG)	21	21

Quarterfinals
Alex Bruce (CAN); Phyllis Chan (CAN)	9	10
4	Gabby Adcock (ENG); Lauren Smith (ENG)	21	21

==== Section 4 ====
Round of 32
Kate Foo Kune (MRI); Yeldy Louison (MRI)	20	17
Jennifer Fry (RSA); Sandra le Grange (RSA)	22	21
Mariama Eastmond (BAR); Shari Watson (BAR)	5	13
Madushika Beruwalage (SRI); Nadeesha Gayanthi (SRI)	21	21
Sofia Arkhipkina (FAI); Anna Luxton (FAI)	1	2
Juliette Ah-Wan (SEY); Allisen Camille (SEY)	21	21

Round of 16
Jennifer Fry (RSA); Sandra le Grange (RSA)	21	15	21
Madushika Beruwalage (SRI); Nadeesha Gayanthi (SRI)	12	21	17
Juliette Ah-Wan (SEY); Allisen Camille (SEY)	8	9
2	Vivian Hoo (MAS); Woon Khe Wei (MAS)	21	21

Quarterfinals
Jennifer Fry (RSA); Sandra le Grange (RSA)	7	10
2	Vivian Hoo (MAS); Woon Khe Wei (MAS)	21	21
