= Kristian Callaghan =

English sport shooter (born 1993)

Personal information
- Full name: Kristian Michael Smeeton Callaghan
- Nationality: United Kingdom
- Born: 1 July 1993 (age 32) Reading, England
- Years active: 2007-2023
- Height: 6 ft 2 in (188 cm)
- Weight: 93 kg (205 lb)

Sport
- Country: England
- Sport: Sport shooter
- Event(s): 10m Air Pistol (AP60); 25m Rapid Fire Pistol (RFP); 25m Standard Pistol (StdP); 25m Centre Fire Pistol (CFP); 50m Pistol (FP)

Achievements and titles
- Highest world ranking: 3rd (10m Air Pistol, 2023)
Medal record
Men's shooting
Representing England
Commonwealth Games
Bronze medal – third place	2014 Glasgow	25 metre rapid fire pistol
- Updated on 7 September 2014

Kristian Callaghan (born 1 July 1993) is a British sport shooter. He competed for England in the 25 metre rapid fire pistol event at the 2014 Commonwealth Games where he won a bronze medal. He finished 4th in the 50 metre pistol event at the 2018 Commonwealth Games.
