= Wrestling at the 2014 Commonwealth Games – Men's freestyle 65 kg =

Wrestling – Men's freestyle 65 kg at the 2014 Commonwealth Games
- Venue: Scottish Exhibition and Conference Centre
- Dates: 31 July 2014
- Competitors: 16 from 15 nations

Medalists
gold medal	Yogeshwar Dutt	India
silver medal	Jevon Balfour	Canada
bronze medal	Sampson Clarkson	Nigeria
bronze medal	Alex Gladkov	Scotland

The men's 65 kg freestyle wrestling competitions at the 2014 Commonwealth Games in Glasgow, Scotland was held on 31 July at the Scottish Exhibition and Conference Centre.

This freestyle wrestling competition consists of a single-elimination tournament, with a repechage used to determine the winner of two bronze medals. The two finalists face off for gold and silver medals. Each wrestler who loses to one of the two finalists moves into the repechage, culminating in a pair of bronze medal matches featuring the semifinal losers each facing the remaining repechage opponent from their half of the bracket.

== Results ==
Results:

Legend

- F — Won by fall

=== Main bracket ===
Round of 16
Philip Roberts (ENG)	6
Muhammad Salman (PAK)	6
Sampson Clarkson (NGR)	7
Jevon Balfour (CAN)	9
Mehrdad Tarash (AUS)	5
Norik Koczarian (NIR)	2
Terry van Rensburg (RSA)	10
Jacone Munene (KEN)	0
Abdulai Rogers (SLE)	0
Chamara Perera (SRI)	8^{F}
Christophe Adroit (MRI)	6
Craig Miller (NZL)	7
Gareth Jones (SCO)	10
Timea Kitiona (KIR)	0
Yogeshwar Dutt (IND)	11
Alex Gladkov (SCO)	0

Quarterfinals
Muhammad Salman (PAK)	6
Jevon Balfour (CAN)	14
Mehrdad Tarash (AUS)	2
Terry van Rensburg (RSA)	4^{F}
Chamara Perera (SRI)	12
Craig Miller (NZL)	1
Gareth Jones (SCO)	0
Yogeshwar Dutt (IND)	10

Semifinals
Jevon Balfour (CAN)	10
Terry van Rensburg (RSA)	9
Chamara Perera (SRI)	0
Yogeshwar Dutt (IND)	10

Final
Jevon Balfour (CAN)	0
Yogeshwar Dutt (IND)	10

=== Repechage ===
Repechage first round
Sampson Clarkson (NGR)	3
Muhammad Salman (PAK)	2
Alex Gladkov (SCO)	10
Gareth Jones (SCO)	0

Bronze medal match
Sampson Clarkson (NGR)	8
Terry van Rensburg (RSA)	0
Alex Gladkov (SCO)	22
Chamara Perera (SRI)	16
