= Athletics at the 2014 Commonwealth Games – Men's 110 metres hurdles =

Men's 110 metres hurdles at the Commonwealth Games

The Men's 110 metres hurdles at the 2014 Commonwealth Games, as part of the athletics programme, was held at Hampden Park on 29 July 2014.

== Round 1 ==
First 3 in each heat (Q) and 2 best performers (q) advance to the Final.

=== Heat 1 ===
Rank	Lane	Name	Reaction Time	Result	Notes
1	-	Andrew Riley (JAM)	0.154	13.47	Q
2	-	Shane Brathwaite (BAR)	0.135	13.54	Q
3	-	Alex Al-Ameen (NGR)	0.172	13.71	Q
4	-	Mikel Thomas (TRI)	0.138	13.86	
5	-	Milan Trajkovic (CYP)	0.160	13.95	
6	-	Ben Reynolds (NIR)	0.167	13.96	
7	-	Wala Gime (PNG)	0.166	14.64	
DQ	-	Andy Turner (ENG)	0.169	DQ	

=== Heat 2 ===
Rank	Lane	Name	Reaction Time	Result	Notes
1	-	Greggmar Swift (BAR)	0.159	13.57	Q
2	-	Lawrence Clarke (ENG)	0.147	13.63	Q
3	-	Nicholas Hough (AUS)	0.152	13.70	Q
4	-	Tyron Akins (NGR)	0.162	13.75	
5	-	Ronald Forbes (CAY)	0.165	13.89	
DNS	-	Durell Busby (TRI)	-	DNS	
DNS	-	Hansle Parchment (JAM)	-	DNS	

=== Heat 3 ===
Rank	Lane	Name	Reaction Time	Result	Notes
1	-	Ryan Brathwaite (BAR)	0.149	13.48	Q
2	-	William Sharman (ENG)	0.164	13.49	Q
3	-	Siddhanth Thingalaya (IND)	0.162	13.93	
4	-	Richard Phillips (JAM)	0.158	13.94	
5	-	Sam Baines (AUS)	0.203	14.03	
6	-	Martins Ogieriakhi (NGR)	0.171	14.13	
7	-	Dennis Bain (BAH)	0.151	14.21	
DNS	-	Wayne Davis (TRI)	-	DNS	

== Final ==
Rank	Lane	Name	Reaction Time	Result	Notes
1st place, gold medalist(s)	-	Andrew Riley (JAM)	0.146	13.32	
2nd place, silver medalist(s)	-	William Sharman (ENG)	0.149	13.36	
3rd place, bronze medalist(s)	-	Shane Brathwaite (BAR)	0.141	13.49	
4	-	Nicholas Hough (AUS)	0.165	13.57	PB
5	-	Ryan Brathwaite (BAR)	0.152	13.63	
6	-	Greggmar Swift (BAR)	0.159	13.74	
7	-	Alex Al-Ameen (NGR)	0.168	13.77	
8	-	Lawrence Clarke (ENG)	0.152	13.84	
