= Weightlifting at the 2014 Commonwealth Games – Women's 69 kg =

Weightlifting – Women's 69 kg at the 2014 Commonwealth Games
- Venue: Clyde Auditorium
- Dates: 28 July 2014
- Competitors: 13 from 12 nations
- Winning total weight: 234 kg

Medalists
gold medal	Marie Fegue	Cameroon
silver medal	Itohan Ebireguesele	Nigeria
bronze medal	Marie-Josée Arès-Pilon	Canada

The Women's 69 kg weightlifting event was an event at the 2014 Commonwealth Games, limiting competitors to a maximum of 69 kilograms (152 lb) of body mass. The competition took place on 28 July and was the eighth weightlifting event to conclude. The event took place at the Clyde Auditorium. The weightlifter from Cameroon won the gold, with a combined lift of 234 kg.

== Result ==
Rank	Athlete	Snatch (kg)				Clean & Jerk (kg)				Total (kg)
Rank	Athlete	1	2	3	Result	1	2	3	Result	Total (kg)
1st place, gold medalist(s)	Marie Fegue (CMR)	97	~~102~~	102	102	120	125	132	132	234
2nd place, silver medalist(s)	Itohan Ebireguesele (NGR)	95	~~98~~	100	100	117	~~122~~	122	122	222
3rd place, bronze medalist(s)	Marie-Josée Arès-Pilon (CAN)	95	97	99	99	113	115	~~117~~	115	214
4	Rebekah Tiler (ENG)	~~91~~	91	~~95~~	91	118	~~123~~	~~123~~	118	209
5	Kristel Ngarlem (CAN)	85	~~90~~	~~90~~	85	108	113	116	116	201
6	Guba Hale (PNG)	85	~~90~~	~~90~~	85	105	110	~~114~~	110	195
7	Sandra Ako (PNG)	80	83	85	85	100	106	~~107~~	106	191
8	Mercy Obiero (KEN)	80	~~85~~	~~85~~	80	~~106~~	~~106~~	107	107	187
9	Vanessa Lui (SAM)	~~80~~	80	~~85~~	80	105	~~108~~	~~108~~	105	185
10	Janet Georges (SEY)	80	~~85~~	85	85	95	~~102~~	~~102~~	95	180
11	Louise Mather (SCO)	~~75~~	~~75~~	75	75	92	96	~~100~~	96	171
12	Kaie Luenita (TUV)	35	40	45	45	45	50	~~55~~	50	95
–	Natasha Perdue (WAL)	~~88~~	~~88~~	~~88~~	-	—N/a				DNF
