= Wrestling at the 2014 Commonwealth Games – Women's freestyle 58 kg =

Wrestling Event at Glasgow Commonwealth 2014

Wrestling – Women's freestyle 58 kg at the 2014 Commonwealth Games
- Venue: Scottish Exhibition and Conference Centre
- Dates: 30 July 2014
- Competitors: 9 from 8 nations

Medalists
gold medal	Aminat Adeniyi	Nigeria
silver medal	Sakshi Malik	India
bronze medal	Braxton Stone-Papadopoulos	Canada
bronze medal	Tayla Ford	New Zealand

The women's 58 kg freestyle wrestling competitions at the 2014 Commonwealth Games in Glasgow, Scotland was held on 30 July at the Scottish Exhibition and Conference Centre.

This freestyle wrestling competition consists of a single-elimination tournament, with a repechage used to determine the winner of two bronze medals. The two finalists face off for gold and silver medals. Each wrestler who loses to one of the two finalists moves into the repechage, culminating in a pair of bronze medal matches featuring the semifinal losers each facing the remaining repechage opponent from their half of the bracket.

== Results ==
Results:

Legend

- F — Won by fall

=== Main bracket ===
Round of 16
Sarah Grundy (ENG)	8
Norma Gordon (RSA)	6

Quarterfinals
Olga Butkevych (ENG)	5
Braxton Stone-Papadopoulos (CAN)	14
Sakshi Malik (IND)	10
Edwige Ngono Eyia (CMR)	0
Carissa Holland (AUS)	2
Tayla Ford (NZL)	4^{F}
Aminat Adeniyi (NGR)	10
Sarah Grundy (ENG)	0

Semifinals
Braxton Stone-Papadopoulos (CAN)	5
Sakshi Malik (IND)	8
Tayla Ford (NZL)	1
Aminat Adeniyi (NGR)	11

Final
Sakshi Malik (IND)	0
Aminat Adeniyi (NGR)	10

=== Repechage ===
Bronze medal match
Edwige Ngono Eyia (CMR)	0
Braxton Stone-Papadopoulos (CAN)	4^{F}
Sarah Grundy (ENG)	0
Tayla Ford (NZL)	4^{F}
