= Andrew Riley =

Jamaican sprinter (born 1988)

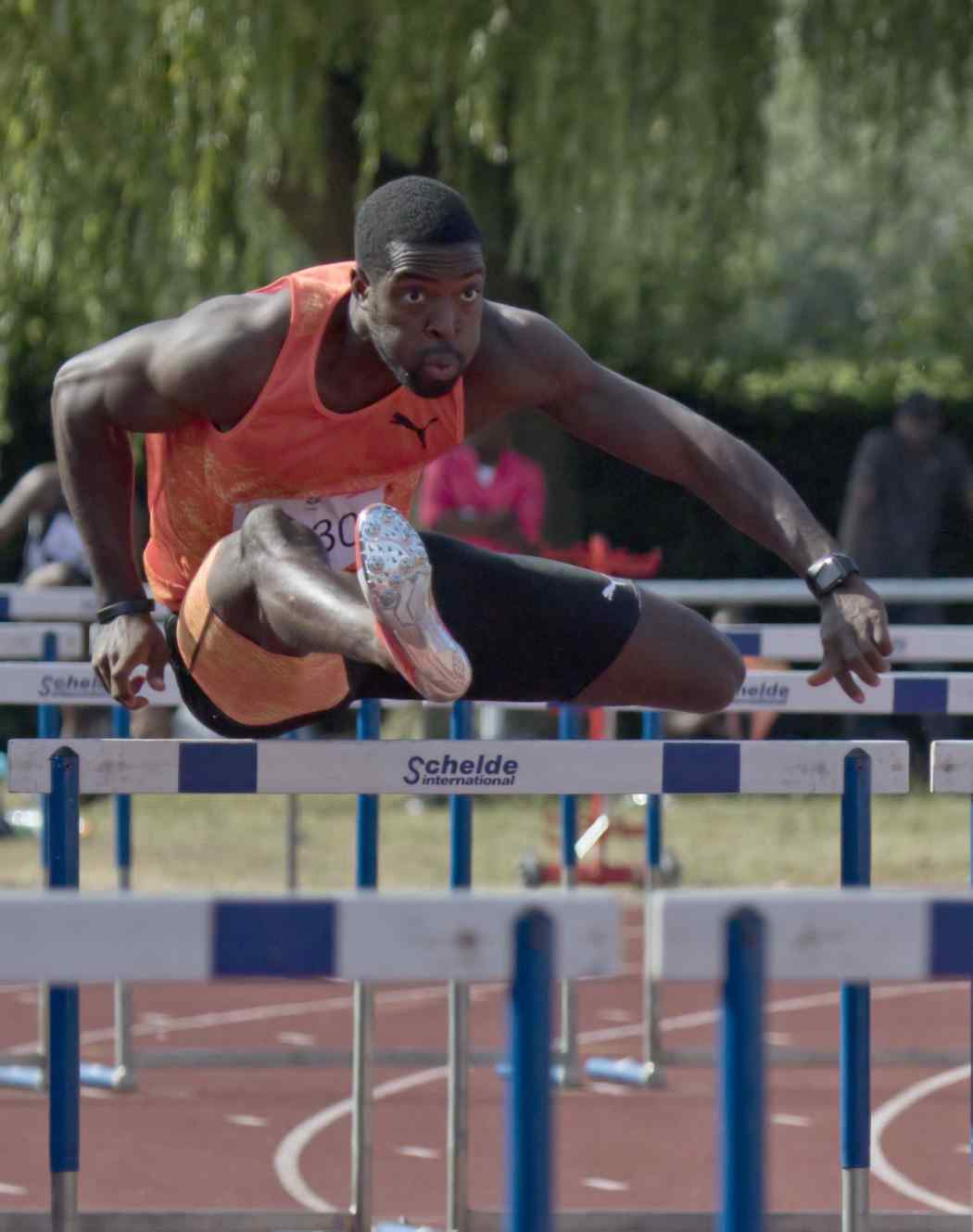
- Riley in 2018

Personal information
- Nationality: Jamaica
- Born: 6 September 1988 (age 37)
- Height: 1.85 m (6 ft 1 in)
- Weight: 82 kg (181 lb)

Sport
- Sport: Running
- Event(s): 100 metres, 110 metres hurdles
- College team: Illinois Fighting Illini

Achievements and titles
- Personal best(s): 100m: 10.02 (Des Moines 2012); 110m hurdles: 13.14
Medal record
Men's athletics
Representing Jamaica
Commonwealth Games
Gold medal – first place	2014 Glasgow	110 m hurdles
CARIFTA Games (Junior)
Silver medal – second place	2007 Providenciales	Heptathlon

Andrew Riley (born 6 September 1988, Saint Thomas, Jamaica) is a Jamaican sprinter, mainly competing in the 110 m hurdles and more recently 100 metres. He won the gold medal in the 110 m at the 2014 Commonwealth Games. He went pro signing with Puma SE shortly after his collegiate career.

== Competition record ==
Year	Competition	Venue	Position	Event	Notes
Representing Jamaica
2007	CARIFTA Games (U20)	Providenciales, Turks and Caicos	2nd	Heptathlon	4601 pts
2011	World Championships	Daegu, South Korea	14th (sf)	110 m hurdles	13.75
2012	Olympic Games	London, United Kingdom	24th (h)	110 m hurdles	13.59
2013	World Championships	Moscow, Russia	8th	110 m hurdles	13.51
2014	World Indoor Championships	Sopot, Poland	8th (sf)	60 m hurdles	7.59
2014	Commonwealth Games	Glasgow, United Kingdom	1st	110 m hurdles	13.32
2015	World Championships	Beijing, China	16th (sf)	110 m hurdles	13.43
2016	Olympic Games	Rio de Janeiro	11th (sf)	110 m hurdles	13.46
2019	World Championships	Doha, Qatar	16th (sf)	110 m hurdles	13.57
