= Wrestling at the 2014 Commonwealth Games – Men's freestyle 61 kg =

Wrestling – Men's freestyle 61 kg at the 2014 Commonwealth Games
- Venue: Scottish Exhibition and Conference Centre
- Dates: 30 July 2014
- Competitors: 16 from 14 nations

Medalists
gold medal	David Tremblay	Canada
silver medal	Bajrang Kumar	India
bronze medal	Viorel Etko	Scotland
bronze medal	Amas Daniel	Nigeria

The men's 61 kg freestyle wrestling competitions at the 2014 Commonwealth Games in Glasgow, Scotland was held on 30 July at the Scottish Exhibition and Conference Centre. David Tremblay Won the weight class.

This freestyle wrestling competition consists of a single-elimination tournament, with a repechage used to determine the winner of two bronze medals. The two finalists face off for gold and silver medals. Each wrestler who loses to one of the two finalists moves into the repechage, culminating in a pair of bronze medal matches featuring the semifinal losers each facing the remaining repechage opponent from their half of the bracket.

== Results ==
Results:

Legend

- F — Won by fall

=== Main bracket ===
Round of 16
Deon Swart (AUS)	3
George Ramm (ENG)	15
Michael Asselstine (CAN)	2
Viorel Etko (SCO)	10
John Kariuki (KEN)	2
Arnaud Essindi Sengui (CMR)	14
David Tremblay (CAN)	12
Adam Vella (MLT)	2
Sasha Madyarchyk (ENG)	0
Bajrang Kumar (IND)	12
Udara Fernando (SRI)	0
Marno Plaatjies (RSA)	10
Damion Arzu (WAL)	2
Soukananh Thongsinh (NZL)	12
Amas Daniel (NGR)	11
Abdul Wahab (PAK)	0

Quarterfinals
George Ramm (ENG)	6
Viorel Etko (SCO)	17
Arnaud Essindi Sengui (CMR)	2
David Tremblay (CAN)	12
Bajrang Kumar (IND)	12
Marno Plaatjies (RSA)	1
Soukananh Thongsinh (NZL)	0
Amas Daniel (NGR)	11

Semifinals
Viorel Etko (SCO)	2
David Tremblay (CAN)	10
Bajrang Kumar (IND)	5
Amas Daniel (NGR)	2

Final
David Tremblay (CAN)	12
Bajrang Kumar (IND)	1

=== Repechage ===
Repechage first round
Adam Vella (MLT)	4^{F}
Arnaud Essindi Sengui (CMR)	4
Sasha Madyarchyk (ENG)	14
Marno Plaatjies (RSA)	10

Bronze medal match
Adam Vella (MLT)	0
Viorel Etko (SCO)	10
Sasha Madyarchyk (ENG)	4
Amas Daniel (NGR)	14
