= Shooting at the 2014 Commonwealth Games – Women's 50 metre rifle three positions =

Women's 50 metre rifle three positions at the 2014 Commonwealth Games
- Venue: Barry Buddon Shooting Centre
- Dates: 29 July 2014
- Competitors: 26 from 14 nations

Medalists
gold medal	Jasmine Ser	Singapore
silver medal	Jennifer McIntosh	Scotland
bronze medal	Lajja Gauswami	India

The qualification round of Women's 50 metre rifle three positions event at 2014 Commonwealth Games started the morning of 29 July 2014 at the Barry Buddon Shooting Centre, while the final was held in the evening at the same place.

== Results ==
=== Qualification ===
Rank	Athlete	Country	Kneeling			Prone			Standing			Total
Rank	Athlete	Country	1	2	Result	1	2	Result	1	2	Result	Total
1	Jasmine Ser	Singapore	97	96	193	98	98	196	98	94	192	581 Q/GR
2	Nur Suryani Mohamed Taibi	Malaysia	94	97	191	98	97	195	93	95	188	574 Q
3	Jennifer McIntosh	Scotland	97	90	187	98	99	197	94	95	189	573 Q
4	Esmari van Reenen	South Africa	97	95	192	100	99	199	92	90	182	573 Q
5	Yafei Li	Singapore	97	93	190	99	99	198	93	91	184	572 Q
6	Lajja Gauswami	India	99	96	195	98	97	195	89	92	181	571 Q
7	Robyn Ridley	Australia	93	93	186	100	98	198	91	93	184	568 Q
8	Jenna Mackenzie	New Zealand	94	91	185	99	97	196	94	93	187	568 Q
9	Elizabeth Susan Koshy	India	96	92	188	98	95	193	96	89	185	566
10	Alethea Sedgman	Australia	97	92	189	95	96	191	94	92	186	566
11	Sarah Henderson	Scotland	96	94	190	99	96	195	89	90	179	564
12	Jenny Corish	Wales	96	92	188	98	92	190	95	91	186	564
13	Hannah Pugsley	England	93	92	185	95	98	193	91	93	184	562
14	Sian Corish	Wales	91	90	181	96	98	194	90	96	186	561
15	Muslifah Zulkifli	Malaysia	95	91	186	95	99	194	89	91	180	560
16	Sheree Cox	England	90	96	186	96	96	192	91	89	180	558
17	Tehani Egodawela	Sri Lanka	94	91	185	96	97	193	87	89	176	554
18	Gemma Kermode	Isle of Man	92	93	185	98	97	195	86	88	174	554
19	Sally Johnston	New Zealand	91	94	185	98	97	195	91	79	170	550
20	Rachel Glover	Isle of Man	94	94	188	99	96	195	79	86	165	548
21	Madushani Gamage	Sri Lanka	89	88	177	92	91	183	91	89	180	540
22	Mercy Chodo	Ghana	63	65	128	86	89	175	69	68	136	539
23	Philomina Sapak	Ghana	70	74	144	74	76	150	63	61	124	518
-	Zahara Chelimo	Uganda	-	-	-	-	-	-	-	-	-	DNS
-	Cleopatra Mungoma	Uganda	-	-	-	-	-	-	-	-	-	DNS
-	Patience Unuigbe	Nigeria	-	-	-	-	-	-	-	-	-	DNS

=== Finals ===
Rank	Athlete	Country	Kneeling				Prone				Standing Elimination								Total
Rank	Athlete	Country	1	2	3	Result	1	2	3	Result	1	2	3	4	5	6	7	Result	Total
1st place, gold medalist(s)	Jasmine Ser	Singapore	49.6	50.8	48.5	148.9	50.9	51.7	50.7	153.3	49.8	48.5	9.3	9.6	10.5	9.4	9.8	146.9	449.1
2nd place, silver medalist(s)	Jennifer McIntosh	Scotland	46.9	50.1	49.4	146.4	50.3	50.6	51.2	152.1	51.1	49.9	9.6	10.4	9.1	9.8	7.9	147.8	446.6
3rd place, bronze medalist(s)	Lajja Gauswami	India	46.8	50.8	49.7	147.3	52.2	48.4	51.6	152.2	47.8	49.9	10.1	8.6	9.3	10.9	-	136.6	436.1
4	Nur Suryani Mohamed Taibi	Malaysia	48.4	49.6	47.2	145.2	48.6	50.2	51.2	150.0	48.9	46.6	10.6	10.1	10.6	-	-	126.8	422.0
5	Yafei Li	Singapore	49.3	46.2	49.2	144.7	51.1	51.2	50.8	153.1	47.6	45.3	10.1	10.5	-	-	-	113.5	411.3
6	Esmari van Reenen	South Africa	48.2	51.5	51.0	150.7	51.7	51.4	52.8	155.9	42.7	42.3	9.1	-	-	-	-	94.1	400.7
7	Jenna Mackenzie	New Zealand	48.2	47.3	42.5	138.0	50.4	51.8	50.9	153.1	47.0	47.5	-	-	-	-	-	94.5	385.6
8	Robyn Ridley	Australia	43.7	48.7	49.1	141.5	51.2	48.1	50.0	149.3	45.5	47.9	-	-	-	-	-	93.4	384.2
