= Shooting at the 2014 Commonwealth Games – Men's 25 metre rapid fire pistol =

Shooting – Men's 25 metre rapid fire pistol at the 2014 Commonwealth Games
- Venue: Barry Buddon Shooting Centre
- Dates: 28 July 2014
- Competitors: 17 from 11 nations

Medalists
gold medal	David Chapman	Australia
silver medal	Harpreet Singh	India
bronze medal	Kristian Callaghan	England

The qualification round of Men's 25 metre rapid fire pistol event was held on 28 July 2014 at the Barry Buddon Shooting Centre, while the final was held on 29 July 2014 at the same place. David Chapman from Australia won the gold medal while Harpreet Singh from India Won the silver medal.

== Results ==
=== Qualification ===
Rank	Athlete	Country	Stage 1				Stage 2				Total
Rank	Athlete	Country	1	2	3	Result	1	2	3	Result	Total
1	Harpreet Singh	India	97	99	96	292	96	99	86	281	573 Q
2	Bruce Quick	Australia	96	99	92	287	98	96	91	285	572 Q
3	David Chapman	Australia	97	94	91	282	95	97	94	286	568 Q
4	Kristian Callaghan	England	97	95	84	276	95	93	95	286	559 Q
5	Metodi Igorov	Canada	97	95	87	279	93	93	92	278	557 Q
6	Hasli Izwan Amir Hasan	Malaysia	90	94	91	275	94	90	97	281	556 Q
7	Vijay Kumar	India	95	93	93	281	96	98	80	274	555
8	Khalel Abdullah	Malaysia	95	94	90	279	95	93	86	274	553
9	George Winstanley	Jersey	94	91	82	267	92	89	77	258	525
10	Graham Cock	Norfolk Island	87	76	68	231	81	77	60	218	449
11	Ismaeel Shafeeq	Maldives	90	78	38	204	85	83	60	228	432
12	Arthur Scott	Saint Lucia	66	55	61	182	46	79	42	167	349
13	Lennox Mondesir	Saint Lucia	47	41	17	105	47	25	37	109	214
-	Madu Abdul	Nigeria	-	-	-	-	-	-	-	-	DNS
-	Rhodney Allen	Trinidad and Tobago	-	-	-	-	-	-	-	-	DNS
-	Roger Daniel	Trinidad and Tobago	-	-	-	-	-	-	-	-	DNS
-	Kingsley Okereke	Nigeria	-	-	-	-	-	-	-	-	DNS

=== Finals ===
Rank	Name	Country	1	2	3	4	5	6	7	8	Total
1st place, gold medalist(s)	David Chapman	Australia	3	3	1	2	3	4	3	4	23
2nd place, silver medalist(s)	Harpreet Singh	India	3	1	4	3	3	1	4	2	21
3rd place, bronze medalist(s)	Kristian Callaghan	England	3	2	3	2	2	4	1	-	17
4	Metodi Igorov	Canada	3	2	1	2	4	3	-	-	15
5	Hasli Izwan Amir Hasan	Malaysia	2	2	2	2	1	-	-	-	9
6	Bruce Quick	Australia	2	1	1	4	-	-	-	-	8
