= Wrestling at the 2014 Commonwealth Games – Men's freestyle 125 kg =

Wrestling – Men's freestyle 125 kg at the 2014 Commonwealth Games
- Venue: Scottish Exhibition and Conference Centre
- Dates: 29 July 2014
- Competitors: 10 from 10 nations

Medalists
gold medal	Korey Jarvis	Canada
silver medal	Rajeev Tomar	India
bronze medal	Sinivie Boltic	Nigeria
bronze medal	Chinu Sandhu	England

The men's 125 kg freestyle wrestling competitions at the 2014 Commonwealth Games in Glasgow, Scotland was held on 29 July at the Scottish Exhibition and Conference Centre.

== Results ==
=== Main bracket ===
Round of 16
Zaman Anwar (PAK)	12
Adem Digovich (RSA)	1
Claude Mbianga (CMR)	5
Chinu Sandhu (ENG)	14

Quarterfinals
Sinivie Boltic (NGR)	2
Rajeev Tomar (IND)	12
Kalum Moraandage (SRI)	0
Marcus Carney (NZL)	10
Hollis Mkanga (KEN)	1
Korey Jarvis (CAN)	11
Zaman Anwar (PAK)	1
Chinu Sandhu (ENG)	3

Semifinals
Rajeev Tomar (IND)	13
Marcus Carney (NZL)	1
Korey Jarvis (CAN)	12
Chinu Sandhu (ENG)	2

Final
Rajeev Tomar (IND)	0
Korey Jarvis (CAN)	3

=== Repechage ===
Bronze medal match
Sinivie Boltic (NGR)	11
Marcus Carney (NZL)	0
Hollis Mkanga (KEN)	1
Chinu Sandhu (ENG)	12
