= Shooting at the 2014 Commonwealth Games – Women's 10 metre air rifle =

Shooting – Women's 10 metre air rifle at the 2014 Commonwealth Games
- Venue: Barry Buddon Shooting Centre
- Dates: 26 July 2014
- Competitors: 28 from 15 nations

Medalists
gold medal	Apurvi Chandela	India
silver medal	Ayonika Paul	India
bronze medal	Nur Suryani Taibi	Malaysia

== Results ==
=== Qualification ===
Rank	Name	1	2	3	4	Points	Notes
1	Apurvi Chandela (IND)	105.1	103.5	101.8	105.2	415.6	Q
2	Martina Veloso (SIN)	105	102.3	103.9	103.7	414.9	Q
3	Sharmin Ratna (BAN)	101.2	103.5	105.1	104	413.8	Q
4	Ayonika Paul (IND)	102.1	103.4	104.1	103.6	413.2	Q
5	Jasmine Ser (SIN)	104.4	103.5	101.7	103.5	413.1	Q
6	Jennifer McIntosh (SCO)	101.8	104.3	103.6	102.4	412.1	Q
7	Nur Suryani Taibi (MAS)	101.7	104.9	101.6	103.5	411.7	Q
8	Jenny Corish (WAL)	102.7	100.8	103.1	104.8	411.4	Q
9	Monica Fyfe (CAN)	101.9	103.9	101.9	103.7	411.4	
10	Syeda Sultana (BAN)	101.8	102.7	102.9	103.4	410.8	
11	Marilena Constantinou (CYP)	103	102.8	102.1	102.8	410.7	
12	Jennifer Hens (AUS)	102.7	99.5	104	103.4	409.6	
13	Nur Ayuni Farhana Abdul Halim (MAS)	101.4	101.3	102.4	103.2	408.3	
14	Emma Adams (AUS)	101.8	102.2	101	101.9	406.9	
15	Sheree Cox (ENG)	101.5	102.4	102.9	100	406.8	
16	Larissa Sykes (ENG)	102.1	102.9	102	99.5	406.6	
17	Sian Corish (WAL)	100.5	101.9	102.2	101.8	406.4	
18	Praneetta Vasudevan (SRI)	98.6	102.5	101.7	101.5	404.3	
19	Seonaid McIntosh (SCO)	101.1	99.9	101.1	102	404.1	
20	Jenna Mackenzie (NZL)	101	100.2	101.3	101.3	403.8	
21	Aerial Arthur (CAN)	102	100.7	100.6	99.8	403.1	
22	Madushani Gamage (SRI)	98.9	103.5	98.9	99.9	401.2	
23	Rachel Glover (IOM)	99.7	100.9	96.8	100.8	398.0	
24	Stephanie Piri (GIB)	100.3	97.2	97.5	99.4	394.4	
25	Gemma Kermode (IOM)	95.3	100.6	99.2	98.4	393.5	
26	Fanoula Theofanous (CYP)	97.5	98.8	95.4	95.5	387.2	
27	Adaeze Eziuzor (NGR)	-	-	-	-	-	DNS
28	Caroline Utho (NGR)	-	-	-	-	-	DNS

=== Finals ===
Rank	Name	1	2	3	4	5	6	7	8	9	Points	Notes
1st place, gold medalist(s)	Apurvi Chandela (IND)	31.4	63.2	84.0	104.6	126.1	146.2	165.9	186.3	206.7	206.7	FGR
2nd place, silver medalist(s)	Ayonika Paul (IND)	30.2	60.8	81.4	102.4	122.7	144.3	164.1	184.8	204.9	204.9	
3rd place, bronze medalist(s)	Nur Suryani Taibi (MAS)	30.1	62.3	82.6	103.2	123.4	144.0	163.6	184.4	-	184.4	
4	Jasmine Ser (SIN)	31.1	61.8	82.2	103.5	122.9	143.8	163.2	-	-	163.2	
5	Martina Veloso (SIN)	30.7	61.8	82.3	101.6	122.5	143.4	-	-	-	143.4	
6	Sharmin Ratna (BAN)	30.7	61.7	81.5	101.6	122.0	-	-	-	-	122.0	
7	Jennifer McIntosh (SCO)	29.6	60.5	80.5	100.7	-	-	-	-	-	100.7	
8	Jenny Corish (WAL)	30.1	58.0	79.1	-	-	-	-	-	-	79.1	
