= Kiribati at the 2014 Commonwealth Games =

- CG code: KIR
- CGA: Kiribati National Olympic Committee
- Website: oceaniasport.com/kiribati

in Glasgow, Scotland
- Competitors: 20 in 6 sports
- Flag bearer: David Katoatau
- Medals Ranked =20th: Gold 1 Silver 0 Bronze 0 Total 1

Commonwealth Games appearances (overview)
- 1998; 2002; 2006; 2010; 2014; 2018; 2022; 2026; 2030

Kiribati competed in the 2014 Commonwealth Games in Glasgow, Scotland from 23 July – 3 August 2014.

Due to a scheduling conflict between the Commonwealth Games and the 2014 Micronesian Games in Pohnpei, Kiribati has had to split its delegation between the two events. In Glasgow, the country is represented by 20 athletes in six sports: athletics, badminton, boxing, table tennis, weightlifting and wrestling. Participating in their fifth Commonwealth Games, Kiribati won its first medal, a gold, in men's weightlifting 105 kg by David Katoatau.

== Medalists ==
Medal	Name	Sport	Event	Date
Gold	David Katoatau	Weightlifting	Men's 105 kg	July 30

== Athletics ==
Key

- Note–Ranks given for track events are within the athlete's heat only
- Q = Qualified for the next round
- q = Qualified for the next round as a fastest loser or, in field events, by position without achieving the qualifying target
- NR = National record
- N/A = Round not applicable for the event

Men
Track & road events

Athlete	Event	Heat		Semifinal		Final	
Athlete	Event	Result	Rank	Result	Rank	Result	Rank
Nooa Takooa	100 m	11.56	70	did not advance			

Field Events

Athlete	Event	Qualification		Final	
Athlete	Event	Distance	Rank	Distance	Rank
Boitu Baiteke	Long jump	6.37	22	did not advance	
Boitu Baiteke	Triple jump	13.21	19	did not advance	
Raobu Tarawa	Shot put	12.08	20	did not advance	
Raobu Tarawa	Discus throw	39.23	19	did not advance	

== Badminton ==
Athlete	Event	Round of 64	Round of 32	Round of 16	Quarterfinals	Semifinals	Final	Rank
Athlete	Event	Opposition Score	Opposition Score	Opposition Score	Opposition Score	Opposition Score	Opposition Score	Rank
Tinabora Tekeiaki	Women's Singles	Honderich (CAN); L w/o	did not advance					
Teitiria Utimawa	Women's Singles	Gray (NFI); L w/o	did not advance					
Tinabora Tekeiaki; Teitiria Utimawa	Women's Doubles	—N/a	India; L w/o	did not advance				

== Boxing ==
Men

Athlete	Event	Round of 32	Round of 16	Quarterfinals	Semifinals	Final	
Athlete	Event	Opposition Result	Opposition Result	Opposition Result	Opposition Result	Opposition Result	Rank
Toaua Bangke	Light welterweight	Shogbamu (NGR); L 0 - 3	did not advance				
Andrew Kometa	Middleweight	Singh (IND); L 0 - 3	did not advance				

Women

Athlete	Event	Round of 16	Quarterfinals	Semifinals	Final	Rank
Athlete	Event	Opposition Result	Opposition Result	Opposition Result	Opposition Result	Rank
Taoriba Biniati	Lightweight	Ratna (MRI); L 0 - 3	did not advance			

Taoriba Biniati is Kiribati's first female boxer. She represented her country at the age of 18 in the 2014 Commonwealth Games. This was her first ever fight against another woman. She lost on points to Mauritian fighter Isabelle Ratna in the lightweight division.

== Table Tennis ==
Singles

Athlete	Event	Group Stage			Round of 64	Round of 32	Round of 16	Quarterfinals	Semifinals	Final	Rank
Athlete	Event	Opposition Result	Opposition Result	Rank	Opposition Result	Opposition Result	Opposition Result	Opposition Result	Opposition Result	Opposition Result	Rank
Teitua Beia	Men's Singles	Laurence (SEY); L 0 - 4	Ranasingha (SRI); L 0 - 4	3	did not advance						
Choy Freddy	Men's Singles	Ahmed (MDV); L 2 - 4	Lartey (GHA); L 0 - 4	3	did not advance						
Katirakei Tetabo	Men's Singles	Leong (MAS); L 0 - 4	Band (JER); L 1 - 4	3	did not advance						

Doubles

Athlete	Event	Round of 64	Round of 32	Round of 16	Quarterfinals	Semifinals	Final	Rank
Athlete	Event	Opposition Result	Opposition Result	Opposition Result	Opposition Result	Opposition Result	Opposition Result	Rank
Choy Freddy; Katirakei Tetabo	Men's Doubles	Wales; L 0 - 3	did not advance					

Team

Athlete	Event	Group Stage				Round of 16	Quarterfinals	Semifinals	Final	Rank
Athlete	Event	Opposition Result	Opposition Result	Opposition Result	Rank	Opposition Result	Opposition Result	Opposition Result	Opposition Result	Rank
Teitua Beia; Choy Freddy; Katirakei Tetabo	Men's Team	Mauritius; L 0-3	Bangladesh; L 1-3	Nigeria; L 0-3	4 qB	Kenya; L 2-3	did not advance			

Qualification Legend: Q=Main Bracket (medal); qB=Consolation Bracket (non-medal)

== Weightlifting ==
Men

Athlete	Event	Snatch		Clean & Jerk		Total	Rank
Athlete	Event	Result	Rank	Result	Rank	Total	Rank
Takenibeia Toromon	−69 kg	115	12	145	11	260	11
Taretiita Tabaroua	−77 kg	110	19	145	14	255	17
Taubena Tatonga	−85 kg	115	16	145	14	260	15
David Katoatau	−105 kg	148	4	200	1	348	1st place, gold medalist(s)

Women

Athlete	Event	Snatch		Clean & Jerk		Total	Rank
Athlete	Event	Result	Rank	Result	Rank	Total	Rank
Tiaterenga Kaua	−75 kg	71	8	80	8	151	8

== Wrestling ==
Key:

- VT - Victory by Fall.
- PP - Decision by Points - the loser with technical points.
- PO - Decision by Points - the loser without technical points.

Men's freestyle

Athlete	Event	Round of 32	Round of 16	Quarterfinal	Semifinal	Repechage	Final / BM	Rank
Athlete	Event	Opposition Result	Opposition Result	Opposition Result	Opposition Result	Opposition Result	Opposition Result	Rank
Timea Kitiona	−65 kg	—N/a	G Jones (SCO); L 0-4	did not advance				
Iabin Tokia	−74 kg	Bye	D Galea (MLT); L 0-5	did not advance				
Taonatetika Koru	−97 kg	—N/a	S Tamarau (NGR); L 0-4	did not advance				
