= Powerlifting at the 2014 Commonwealth Games – Men's +72 kg =

Powerlifting – Men's +72 kg at the 2014 Commonwealth Games
- Venue: Clyde Auditorium
- Dates: 2 August 2014
- Competitors: 11 from 9 nations
- Winning total weight: 197kg

Medalists
gold medal	Abdulazeez Ibrahim	Nigeria
silver medal	Rajinder Rahelu	India
bronze medal	Jong Yee Khie	Malaysia

The Men's +72 kg para-sport powerlifting event at the 2014 Commonwealth Games in Glasgow, Scotland, took place at Scottish Exhibition and Conference Centre on 2 August. The weightlifter from Nigeria won the gold.

== Result ==
Rank	Athlete	#1	#2	#3	Result	Notes
1st place, gold medalist(s)	Abdulazeez Ibrahim (NGR)	217	~~222~~	224	197	
2nd place, silver medalist(s)	Rajinder Rahelu (IND)	182	185	~~189~~	180.5	
3rd place, bronze medalist(s)	Jong Yee Khie (MAS)	195	202	206	178	
4	Michael Yule (SCO)	172	177	~~183~~	172.9	
5	Mohd Shahmil Md Saad (MAS)	192	197	200	168.8	
6	Ruben Soroseb (NAM)	195	200	~~205~~	167.4	
7	Maurice Francis Biwole Nkodo (CMR)	~~165~~	165	172	162.6	
8	Theogene Hakizimana (RWA)	~~173~~	173	~~180~~	158.1	
9	Leigh Bruce Skinner (AUS)	160	164	~~166~~	155.7	
10	Benjamin Wright (AUS)	163	167	~~171~~	152.1	
11	Timothy Harabe (PNG)	~~185~~	~~185~~	~~185~~	DNF	
