= David Tremblay =

Canadian wrestler (born 1987)

Personal information
- Born: September 18, 1987 (age 38) Windsor, Ontario, Canada
- Height: 1.62 m (5 ft 4 in)
- Weight: 55 kg (121 lb)

Sport
- Country: Canada
- Sport: Wrestling
- Event: Freestyle
Medal record
Men's freestyle wrestling
Representing Canada
Commonwealth Games
Gold medal – first place	2014 Glasgow	61 kg

David Tremblay (born September 18, 1987 in Windsor, Ontario) is a Canadian freestyle wrestler. In 2011, Tremblay won the gold medal at the Pan American Qualification tournament and thus qualified to compete at the 2012 Summer Olympics. In 2014, Tremblay won the men's 61-kilogram title in the 2014 Commonwealth Games, defeating the 2013 World Bronze Medalist from India in the Finals. He is also a 5-time Canadian Interuniversity Champions (CIS). Tremblay is a graduate of Concordia University in Montreal.
