= Ganesh Mali =

Indian weightlifter (born 1993)

Personal information
- Nationality: Indian
- Born: 14 May 1993 (age 33) Kurundawad, Kolhapur, India
- Weight: 56 kg (123 lb) (2014)

Sport
- Country: India
- Sport: Weightlifting
- Event: 56 kg
- Coached by: Pradip patil
Medal record
Men's weightlifting
Representing India
Commonwealth Games
Bronze medal – third place	2014 Glasgow	56 kg
- Updated on 25 July 2014

Ganesh Mali (born 14 May 1993) is an Indian weightlifter who won a bronze medal in the men's 56 kg weight class at the 2014 Commonwealth Games at Glasgow. He lives at Kolhapur city in the Maharashtra state of India.
