= Swati Singh (weightlifter) =

Indian weightlifter (born 1987)

Personal information
- Born: 2 October 1987 (age 38) Varanasi, Uttar Pradesh, India
- Height: 1.65 m (5 ft 5 in) (2014)
- Weight: 53 kg (117 lb) (2014)

Sport
- Country: India
- Sport: Weightlifting
- Event: 53 kg
Medal record
Women's weightlifting
Representing India
Commonwealth Games
Bronze medal – third place	2014 Glasgow	53 kg
- Updated on 30 July 2014

Swati Singh (born 2 October 1987) is an Indian weightlifter who won the bronze medal in the women's 53 kg weight class at the 2014 Commonwealth Games at Glasgow. Singh had originally finished fourth but the gold medal winner Chika Amalaha of Nigeria failed a drug test, elevating Singh to bronze medal position. In 2019 she tested positive for Morphine and was banned for two years by the International Weightlifting Federation.
