= Itohan Ebireguesele =

Nigerian weightlifter (born 1990)

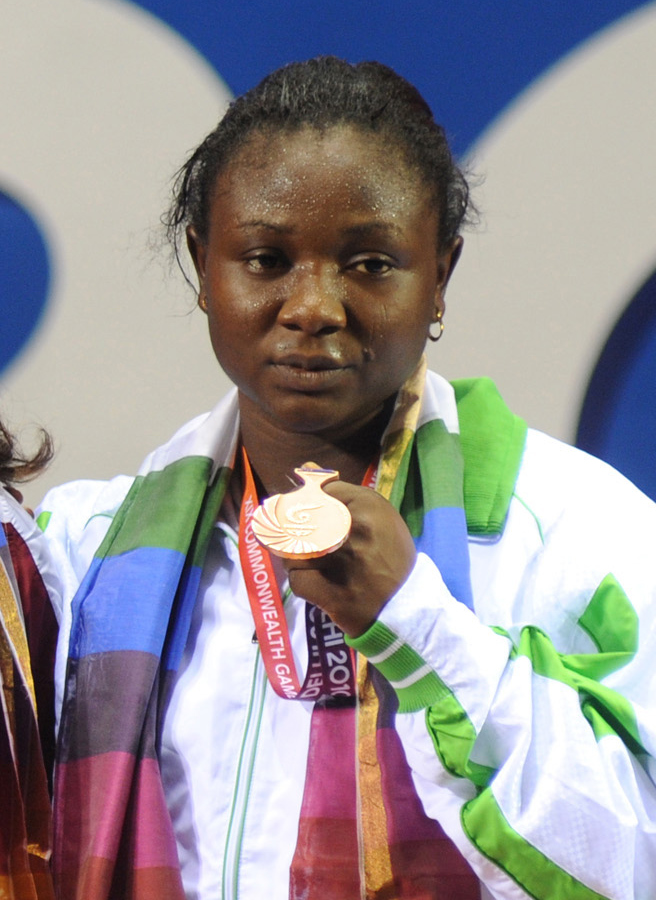
- Ebireguesele at the 2010 Commonwealth Games

Personal information
- Nationality: Nigerian
- Born: 31 July 1990 (age 35) Benin
- Weight: 67 kg (148 lb)

Sport
- Sport: Weightlifting
- Event: 69 kg
Medal record
Representing Nigeria
Commonwealth Games
Silver medal – second place	2014 Glasgow	Women's 69 kg
Bronze medal – third place	2010 Delhi	Women's 69 kg

Itohan Ebireguesele (born 31 July 1990) is a Nigerian weightlifter. Competing in the 69 kg division she won medals at the 2010 and 2014 Commonwealth Games.
