= Santoshi Matsa =

Indian weightlifter (born 1994)

Personal information
- Nationality: Indian
- Born: 10 March 1994 (age 32) Kondavelagada, Vijayanagaram, Andhra Pradesh, India
- Height: 1.55 m (5 ft 1 in) (2014)
- Weight: 52 kg (115 lb) (2014)

Sport
- Country: India
- Sport: Weightlifting
- Event: 53 kg
Medal record
Women's weightlifting
Representing India
Asian Championships
Bronze medal – third place	2011 Tongling	53 kg
Commonwealth Games
Silver medal – second place	2014 Glasgow	53 kg
Commonwealth Championships
Gold medal – first place	2015 Pune	53 kg
Silver medal – second place	2017 Gold Coast	53 kg
Silver medal – second place	2019 Apia	55 kg
- Updated on 24 January 2022

Santoshi Matsa (born 10 March 1994) is an Indian weightlifter who won the silver medal in the women's 53 kg weight class at the 2014 Commonwealth Games at Glasgow. Matsa had originally finished in bronze medal position, but the gold medal winner Chika Amalaha of Nigeria failed a drug test, elevating Matsa to silver medal position. Santoshi lifted a total of 188 kg — 83 kg in snatch and 105 in clean and jerk.

Andhra Pradesh government announced cash reward of Rs five lakh for winning medal in weightlifting in the Commonwealth Games.

== Major results ==
Year	Venue	Weight	Snatch (kg)				Clean & Jerk (kg)				Total	Rank
Year	Venue	Weight	1	2	3	Rank	1	2	3	Rank	Total	Rank
World Championships
2010	Antalya, Turkey	48 kg	58	~~62~~	62	26	77	79	81	26	143	26
2011	Paris, France	53 kg	70	73	75	27	90	94	96	22	171	21
2010	Antalya, Turkey	48 kg	58	~~62~~	62	26	77	79	81	26	143	26
