= Weightlifting at the 2014 Commonwealth Games – Women's 53 kg =

Weightlifting – Women's 53 kg at the 2014 Commonwealth Games
- Venue: Clyde Auditorium
- Dates: 25 July 2014
- Competitors: 12 from 9 nations
- Winning total weight: 193 kg

Medalists
gold medal	Dika Toua	Papua New Guinea
silver medal	Santoshi Matsa	India
bronze medal	Swati Singh	India

The Women's 53 kg weightlifting event was the second-lightest women's event at the 2014 Commonwealth Games, limiting competitors to a maximum of 53 kilograms (117 lb) of body mass. The competition took place on 25 July and was the first weightlifting event to conclude. The event took place at the Clyde Auditorium, in Glasgow, Scotland.

The event was originally won by 16-year-old Chika Amalaha of Nigeria. Following a failed doping test, Amalaha was stripped of her medal and placement, and the medals were redistributed. The weightlifter from Papua New Guinea, Dika Toua, took the gold following the redistribution of medals.

== Result ==
The final standing of the competitors, following the redistribution of medals, was as follows:

Rank	Athlete	Snatch (kg)				Clean & Jerk (kg)				Total (kg)	Notes
Rank	Athlete	1	2	3	Result	1	2	3	Result	Total (kg)	Notes
1st place, gold medalist(s)	Dika Toua (PNG)	79	~~82~~	82	82	106	111	~~115~~	111	193	GR
2nd place, silver medalist(s)	Santoshi Matsa (IND)	78	81	83	83	102	105	~~109~~	105	188	
3rd place, bronze medalist(s)	Swati Singh (IND)	80	83	~~85~~	83	100	~~103~~	~~106~~	100	183	GR
4	Erika Ropati-Frost (AUS)	71	74	76	76	94	98	99	99	175	
5	Phillipa Hale (NZL)	76	~~78~~	79	79	95	~~98~~	~~98~~	95	174	
6	Socheata Be (AUS)	~~73~~	73	77	77	92	96	~~98~~	96	173	
7	Azizah Fadzil (MAS)	77	~~80~~	~~80~~	77	~~95~~	~~95~~	95	95	172	
8	Jessica Ruel (CAN)	~~76~~	~~76~~	76	76	91	~~95~~	~~95~~	91	167	
9	Frenceay Titus (MAS)	70	~~73~~	~~73~~	70	90	~~92~~	~~92~~	90	160	
10	Ruth Baffoe (GHA)	65	68	71	71	78	~~82~~	82	82	153	
11	Jessica Edge (MLT)	57	61	64	64	78	81	~~84~~	81	145	
DSQ	Chika Amalaha (NGR)	82	~~85~~	85	85	102	107	111	111	196	
