= Chika Amalaha =

Nigerian weightlifter (born 1997)

Personal information
- Full name: Chika Joy Amalaha
- Nationality: Nigerian
- Born: 28 October 1997 (age 28) Abia State, Nigeria
- Height: 5 ft (152 cm)
- Weight: 53 kg (117 lb) (2014)

Sport
- Sport: Weightlifting
- Event: 53 kg
- Coached by: Evelyn Timothy
Medal record
Women's weightlifting
Representing Nigeria
African Games
Silver medal – second place	2019 Rabat	55 kg
African Championships
Gold medal – first place	2019 Cairo	55 kg
Commonwealth Games
Disqualified	2014 Glasgow	53 kg
Commonwealth Championships
Silver medal – second place	2013 Penang	53 kg
- Updated on 9 January 2022

Chika Joy Amalaha (born 28 October 1997) is a Nigerian weightlifter. In 2019 she tested positive for metenolone and has been banned from competing until 2027 by the International Weightlifting Federation.

== 2014 Commonwealth Games ==
Amalaha won the gold medal in the women's 53 kg weight class at the 2014 Commonwealth Games at Glasgow, and set a new Games records in 53 kg weight category in both the snatch and overall elements.

She later failed a drug test, and was temporarily banned from continuing the Games on 29 July 2014 after Amiloride and Hydrochlorothiazide were found in her A sample. Her B sample was then sent for testing the following day, which returned positive for prohibited substances. Following the Commonwealth Games Federation (CGF) scheduled meeting with Amalaha on 1 August 2014, she was stripped of her medal and the Games record she set was revoked. As a result, Dika Toua of Papua New Guinea was awarded gold, and Santoshi Matsa and Swati Singh, both from India, were awarded silver and bronze respectively.

Amalaha was subsequently handed a two-year doping ban. The ban ended 25 July 2016.
