= Sandra le Grange =

South African badminton player (born 1993)

Personal information
- Born: 5 July 1993 (age 33) Johannesburg, South Africa

Sport
- Country: South Africa
- Sport: Badminton

Women's
- Highest ranking: 219 (WS) 19 Mar 2015; 131 (WD) 6 Apr 2015; 483 (XD) 9 Jan 2014
- BWF profile
Medal record
Badminton
Representing South Africa
African Games
| Silver medal – second place | 2015 Brazzaville | Mixed team |
African Badminton Championships
| Gold medal – first place | 2014 Gaborone | Mixed team |
| Gold medal – first place | 2013 Rose Hill | Mixed team |
| Silver medal – second place | 2017 Benoni | Mixed team |
| Bronze medal – third place | 2017 Benoni | Women's doubles |
| Bronze medal – third place | 2014 Gaborone | Women's singles |
| Bronze medal – third place | 2013 Rose Hill | Women's doubles |

Sandra le Grange (born 5 July 1993) is a South African female badminton player. In 2013, she won bronze medal at the African Badminton Championships in women's doubles event with her partner Elme de Villiers.

== Achievements ==
=== African Badminton Championships ===
Women's Singles
| Year | Venue | Opponent | Score | Result |
|---|---|---|---|---|
| 2014 | Lobatse Stadium; Gaborone, Botswana | (Mauritius) Kate Foo Kune | 20-22, 21-19, 10-21 | Bronze |

Women's Doubles
| Year | Venue | Partner | Opponent | Score | Result |
|---|---|---|---|---|---|
| 2017 | John Barrable Hall; Benoni, South Africa | (South Africa) Johanita Scholtz | (South Africa) Michelle Butler-Emmett (South Africa) Jennifer Fry | 15-21, 20-22 | Bronze |
| 2013 | National Badminton Centre; Rose Hill, Mauritius | (South Africa) Elme de Villiers | (Seychelles) Juliette Ah-Wan (Seychelles) Alisen Camille | 12-21, 16-21 | Bronze |

=== BWF International Challenge/Series ===
Women's Doubles
| Year | Tournament | Partner | Opponent | Score | Result |
|---|---|---|---|---|---|
| 2016 | South Africa International | (South Africa) Elme de Villiers | (South Africa) Michelle Butler-Emmett (South Africa) Jennifer Fry | 15-21, 16-21 | (silver) Runner-up |
| 2013 | South Africa International | (South Africa) Michelle Butler-Emmett | (South Africa) Elme de Villiers (Serbia) Sandra Halilovic | 14-21, 13-21 | (silver) Runner-up |
| 2013 | Mauritius International | (South Africa) Elme de Villiers | (Nigeria) Dorcas Ajoke Adesokan (Nigeria) Grace Gabriel | 21-15, 21-16 | (gold) Winner |

Mixed Doubles
| Year | Tournament | Partner | Opponent | Score | Result |
|---|---|---|---|---|---|
| 2016 | South Africa International | (South Africa) Andries Malan | (Russia) Anatoliy Yartsev (Russia) Evgeniya Kosetskaya | 13-21, 9-21 | (silver) Runner-up |

BWF International Challenge tournament
BWF International Series tournament
BWF Future Series tournament
