= List of target rifle shooters =

The following is a list of notable target rifle shooters.

Name	Born	Died	Country	Reference
Alain Marion	1946	2023	Canada	
Alfred Paget Humphry	1850	1916	England	
Andrew Luckman	1972		England	
Andrew Tucker	1937	2003	England	
Angus McLeod	1964		Scotland	
Arthur Fulton	1887	1972	England	
Blanche Badcock	1892	1957	England	
Charles Trotter	1923	2003	Guernsey	
Chris Watson	1978		Wales	
David Luckman	1976		England	
Desmond Vamplew	1955		Canada	
Diane Collings	1959		New Zealand	
Glyn Barnett	1970		England	
Henry Burr	1872	1946	Great Britain	
Ian Shaw	1968		Scotland	
James Paton	1957		Canada	
John Snowden	1969		New Zealand	
John Vivian, 4th Baron Swansea	1925	2005	Wales	
Marjorie Foster	1893	1974	England	
Maurice Blood	1870	1940	Great Britain	
Mike Collings	1954		New Zealand	
Parag Patel	1975		England	
Peter Jory	1974		Guernsey	
Richard Barnett	1863	1930	Great Britain	
Ross Geange	1969		New Zealand	
Thomas Fremantle, 3rd Baron Cottesloe	1862	1956	England	

== See also ==
- List of British sport shooters
