= Shooting at the 2014 Commonwealth Games =

- Venue: Barry Buddon Shooting Centre
- Location: Barry, Angus, Scotland
- Dates: 25 to 29 July 2014

Shooting at the 2014 Commonwealth Games was the 12th appearance of Shooting at the Commonwealth Games. The shooting competitions were held from 25 to 29 July at the Barry Buddon Shooting Centre.

== Medal table ==
* Host nation (Scotland)

Rank	Nation	Gold	Silver	Bronze	Total
1	Australia	6	0	2	8
2	England	5	2	8	15
3	India	4	9	4	17
4	Singapore	2	0	0	2
5	Cyprus	1	1	1	3
6	New Zealand	1	0	0	1
7	Scotland*	0	2	2	4
8	Canada	0	2	1	3
9	Bangladesh	0	1	0	1
9	South Africa	0	1	0	1
9	Wales	0	1	0	1
12	Malaysia	0	0	1	1
Totals (12 entries)		19	19	19	57

== Medalists ==
=== Men's events ===
Event	Gold	Silver	Bronze
10 metre air pistol	Daniel Repacholi; Australia	Prakash Nanjappa; India	Mick Gault; England
10 metre air rifle	Abhinav Bindra; India	Abdullah Baki; Bangladesh	Daniel Rivers; England
25 metre rapid fire pistol	David Chapman; Australia	Harpreet Singh; India	Kristian Callaghan; England
50 metre pistol	Jitu Rai; India	Gurpal Singh; India	Daniel Repacholi; Australia
50 metre rifle prone	Warren Potent; Australia	Gagan Narang; India	Kenneth Parr; England
50 metre rifle three positions	Daniel Rivers; England	Sanjeev Rajput; India	Gagan Narang; India
Skeet	Georgios Achilleos; Cyprus	Drew Christie; Scotland	Rory Warlow; England
Trap	Adam Vella; Australia	Aaron Heading; England	Manavjit Singh Sandhu; India
Double trap	Steven Scott; England	Matthew French; England	Mohammed Asab; India

=== Women's events ===
Event	Gold	Silver	Bronze
10 metre air pistol	Teo Shun Xie; Singapore	Malaika Goel; India	Dorothy Ludwig; Canada
10 metre air rifle	Apurvi Chandela; India	Ayonika Paul; India	Nur Suryani Taibi; Malaysia
25 metre pistol	Rahi Sarnobat; India	Anisa Sayyed; India	Lalita Yauhleuskaya; Australia
50 metre rifle prone	Sally Johnston; New Zealand	Esmari van Reenen; South Africa	Jennifer McIntosh; Scotland
50 metre rifle three positions	Jasmine Ser; Singapore	Jennifer McIntosh; Scotland	Lajja Gauswami; India
Skeet	Laura Coles; Australia	Elena Allen; Wales	Andri Eleftheriou; Cyprus
Trap	Laetisha Scanlan; Australia	Georgia Konstantinidou; Cyprus	Caroline Povey; England
Double trap	Charlotte Kerwood; England	Shreyashi Singh; India	Rachel Parish; England

=== Queen's Prize (open to men & women) ===
Event	Gold	Silver	Bronze
Queen's Prize individual Details	David Luckman; England	James Paton; Canada	Parag Patel; England
Queen's Prize pairs Details	England; David Luckman; Parag Patel	Canada; James Paton; Desmond Vamplew	Scotland; Angus McLeod; Ian Shaw
