= Shooting at the 2014 Commonwealth Games – Queen's Prize individual =

Queen's Prize individual at the 2014 Commonwealth Games
- Venue: Barry Buddon Shooting Centre
- Dates: 27–29 July 2014
- Competitors: 34 from 17 nations

Medalists
gold medal	David Luckman	England
silver medal	James Paton	Canada
bronze medal	Parag Patel	England

The Queen's Prize individual event took place on the 27 to 29 July 2014 at the Barry Buddon Shooting Centre. The winners were determined by the number of points each person had at the end of the third day.

== Results ==
Rank	Athlete	Day 1			Subtotal Day 1	Day 2			Subtotal Day 2	Day 3		Subtotal Day 3	Total
Rank	Athlete	300	500	600	Subtotal Day 1	300	500	600	Subtotal Day 2	900	1000	Subtotal Day 3	Total
1st place, gold medalist(s)	David Luckman (ENG)	35-3v	34-3v	35-5v	104-11v	49-8v	50-5v	50-8v	149-21v	74-6v	74-4v	148-10v	401-42v GR
2nd place, silver medalist(s)	James Paton (CAN)	35-5v	35-2v	34-1v	104-8v	50-5v	50-4v	50-6v	150-15v	74-8v	69-4v	143-12v	397-35v
3rd place, bronze medalist(s)	Parag Patel (ENG)	34-3v	34-3v	35-7v	103-13v	50-7v	49-5v	50-5v	149-17v	72-3v	70-2v	142-5v	394-35v
4	David Calvert (NIR)	35-4v	34-4v	35-4v	104-12v	49-7v	50-8v	49-4v	148-19v	73-4v	68-3v	141-7v	393-38v
5	Jack Alexander (NIR)	35-4v	34-4v	34-1v	103-9v	50-7v	50-6v	49-5v	149-18v	72-2v	68-3v	140-5v	392-32v
6	Frederik Coetzee (RSA)	35-4v	35-4v	34-3v	104-11v	50-4v	50-5v	50-6v	150-15v	73-4v	64-4v	137-8v	391-34v
7	Barry le Cheminant (JER)	35-2v	35-3v	34-5v	104-10v	50-6v	50-8v	50-8v	150-22v	72-6v	64-2v	136-8v	390-40v
8	Nick Mace (GUE)	34-3v	35-2v	35-5v	104-10v	49-5v	49-6v	49-4v	147-15v	70-1v	69-2v	139-3v	390-28v
9	Ian Shaw (SCO)	34-4v	34-5v	34-4v	102-13v	49-4v	50-8v	50-5v	149-17v	73-7v	64-4v	137-11v	388-41v
10	Angus McLeod (SCO)	34-5v	34-2v	34-2v	102-9v	50-6v	50-6v	50-9v	150-21v	73-6v	63-4v	136-10v	388-40v
11	James Corbett (AUS)	34-3v	34-4v	33-5v	101-12v	50-9v	50-8v	50-9v	150-26v	73-5v	63-5v	136-10v	387-48v
12	Geoff Grenfell (AUS)	35-1v	35-5v	35-4v	105-10v	50-9v	50-6v	49-5v	149-20v	74-6v	59-2v	133-8v	387-38v
13	Chris Watson (WAL)	35-1v	33-4v	34-4v	102-9v	50-8v	50-6v	50-6v	150-20v	72-6v	63-1v	135-7v	387-36v
14	Gareth Morris (WAL)	33-3v	34-2v	32-2v	99-7v	49-6v	50-3v	50-7v	149-16v	70-7v	69-1v	139-8v	387-31v
15	Lennox Braithwaite (GUY)	35-4v	35-3v	33-2v	103-9v	50-6v	50-8v	48-4v	148-18v	73-6v	61-1v	134-7v	385-34v
16	Dan Richardson (JER)	34-4v	35-4v	35-4v	104-12v	50-7v	50-4v	50-7v	150-18v	70-6v	60-3v	130-9v	384-39v
17	Johannes du Toit (RSA)	32-3v	34-4v	34-1v	100-8v	50-4v	50-6v	50-4v	150-14v	70-2v	64-5v	134-7v	384-29v
18	John Snowden (NZL)	34-1v	35-3v	33-3v	102-7v	49-5v	50-1v	50-3v	149-9v	71-4v	61-1v	132-5v	383-21v
19	Peter Jory (GUE)	32-2v	35-4v	33-2v	100-8v	48-1v	49-6v	50-2v	147-9v	73-6v	58-5v	131-11v	378-28v
20	Mike Collings (NZL)	35-4v	33-3v	31-0v	99-7v	48-5v	50-2v	50-6v	148-13v	71-5v	60-2v	131-7v	378-27v
21	David C Rickman (JAM)	34-4v	34-5v	34-2v	102-11v	49-6v	50-5v	49-4v	148-15v	69-2v	58-2v	127-4v	377-30v
22	Shahrizal Ishak (MAS)	35-3v	34-1v	34-1v	103-5v	48-6v	50-7	50-5v	148-18v	70-5v	56-1v	126-6v	377-29v
23	Mahendra Persaud (GUY)	35-2v	34+4v	33-2v	102-8v	49-2v	49-7v	48-3v	146-12v	67-5v	61-4v	128-9v	376-29v
24	Christopher K Saina (KEN)	35-3v	33-1v	33-2v	101-6v	50-5v	49-7v	49-5v	148-17v	72-3v	53-2v	125-5v	374-28v
25	Derek Goodwin (FAI)	33-1v	31-0v	32-2v	96-3v	48-6v	50-5v	47-2v	145-13v	71-4v	62-2v	133-6v	374-22v
26	Michael Perez (TRI)	35-2v	31-0v	33-4v	99-6v	46-1v	50-4v	47-1v	143-6v	66-3v	65-6v	131-9v	373-21v
27	Satiender S Sehmi (KEN)	34-4v	34-4v	32-0v	100-8v	49-4v	49-4v	47-3v	145-11v	72-4v	55-1v	127-5v	372-24v
28	Des Vamplew (CAN)	35-2v	33-3v	32-0v	100-5v	49-5v	48-6v	50-6v	147-17v	71-5v	53-0v	124-5v	371-27v
29	Anderson Perry (ANT)	34-1v	34-3v	31-1v	99-5v	45-1v	47-3v	49-4v	141-8v	71-4v	51-1v	122-5v	362-18v
30	Rozli Mohamad (MAS)	31-1v	34-4v	33-3v	98-8v	48-2v	49-5v	49-4v	146-11v	67-5v	49-0v	116-5v	360-24v
31	Gareth Goodwin (FAI)	32-0v	30-1v	34-1v	96-2v	47-4v	47-4v	49-7v	143-15v	70-4v	49-1v	119-5v	358-22v
32	Denis Nelson (JAM)	32-2v	32-4v	29-0v	93-6v	48-2v	48-4v	45-2v	141-8v	62-0v	55-3v	117-3v	351-17v
33	Norris Gomez (TRI)	33-3v	35-2v	34-2v	102-7v	46-5v	48-4v	48-3v	142-12v	63-1v	37-1v	100-2v	344-24v
34	Thomas Greenaway (ANT)	31-1v	30-2v	32-2v	93-5v	41-1v	49-2v	46-2v	136-5v	63-3v	48-1v	111-4v	340-14v
