= Shooting at the 2018 Commonwealth Games – Queen's Prize pairs =

Shooting – Queen's Prize pairs at the 2018 Commonwealth Games
- Venue: Belmont Shooting Centre, Brisbane
- Dates: 9–10 April 2018
- Competitors: 32 from 16 nations

Medalists
gold medal	David Luckman; Parag Patel	England
silver medal	Chris Watson; Gareth Morris	Wales
bronze medal	Alexander Walker; Ian Shaw	Scotland

The Queen's Prize pairs event took place on 9 and 10 April 2018 at the Belmont Shooting Centre in Brisbane. The winners were determined by the cumulative points each team had accrued over both days of competition.

== Records ==
Prior to this competition, the existing Games record was as follows:

Games record	England (David Luckman, Parag Patel)	595-77v	Glasgow, Scotland	25–26 July 2014

== Schedule ==
The schedule was as follows:

Date	Time	Round
Monday 9 April 2018	10:00	Day 1
Tuesday 10 April 2018	10:00	Day 2

All times are Australian Eastern Standard Time (UTC+10)

== Results ==
The results are as follows:

Rank	Country	Names	Day 1				Subtotal Day 1	Day 2		Subtotal Day 2	Total
Rank	Country	Names	300	500	300 & 500	600	Subtotal Day 1	900	1000	Subtotal Day 2	Total
1st place, gold medalist(s)	England	Total; David Luckman; Parag Patel	99-11v 50-5v 49-6v	100-15v 50-8v 50-7v	199-26v 100-13v 99-13v	100-13v 50-7v 50-6v	299-39v 150-20v 149-19v	142-11v 70-7v 72-4v	143-11v 71-4v 72-7v	285-22v 141-11v 144-11v	584-61v 291-31v 293-30v
2nd place, silver medalist(s)	Wales	Total; Chris Watson; Gareth Morris	99-13v 49-6v 50-7v	100-12v 50-7v 50-5v	199-25v 99-13v 100-12v	98-9v 49-5v 49-4v	297-34v 148-18v 149-16v	147-15v 73-7v 74-8v	138-9v 72-6v 66-3v	285-24v 145-13v 140-11v	582-58v 293-31v 289-27v
3rd place, bronze medalist(s)	Scotland	Total; Alexander Walker; Ian Shaw	99-9v 50-4v 49-5v	100-11v 50-6v 50-5v	199-20v 100-10v 99-10v	99-11v 50-4v 49-7v	298-31v 150-14v 148-17v	143-9v 69-6v 74-3v	141-9v 71-6v 70-3v	284-18v 140-12v 144-6v	582-49v 290-26v 292-23v
4	South Africa	Total; Petrus Haasbroek; Jacobus du Toit	100-12v 50-4v 50-8v	99-15v 50-6v 49-9v	199-27v 100-10v 99-17v	100-10v 50-7v 50-3v	299-37v 150-17v 149-20v	145-9v 74-7v 71-2v	137-7v 68-5v 69-2v	282-16v 142-12v 140-4v	581-53v 292-29v 289-24v
5	New Zealand	Total; John Snowden; Brian Carter	98-11v 49-7v 49-4v	99-11v 50-8v 49-3v	197-22v 99-15v 98-7v	99-12v 50-6v 49-6v	296-34v 149-21v 147-13v	145-10v 73-4v 72-6v	140-6v 71-3v 69-3v	285-16v 144-7v 141-9v	581-50v 293-28v 288-22v
6	Australia	Total; Jim Bailey; Ben Emms	100-12v 50-6v 50-6v	100-12v 50-6v 50-6v	200-24v 100-12v 100-12v	99-11v 49-5v 50-6v	299-35v 149-17v 150-18v	142-11v 71-4v 71-7v	139-8v 69-2v 70-6v	281-19v 140-6v 141-13v	580-54v 289-23v 291-31v
7	Northern Ireland	Total; David Calvert; Jack Alexander	99-8v 50-3v 49-5v	100-12v 50-5v 50-7v	199-20v 100-8v 99-12v	99-10v 50-5v 49-5v	298-30v 150-13v 148-17v	138-10v 66-3v 72-7v	143-9v 70-2v 73-7v	281-19v 136-5v 145-14v	579-49v 286-18v 293-31v
8	Canada	Total; Nicole Rossignol; Robert Pitcairn	99-10v 50-6v 49-4v	99-14v 49-8v 50-6v	198-24v 99-14v 99-10v	97-9v 49-6v 48-3v	295-33v 148-20v 147-13v	144-7v 73-3v 71-4v	140-7v 67-3v 73-4v	284-14v 140-6v 144-8v	579-47v 288-26v 291-21v
9	Guernsey	Total; Adam Jory; Peter Jory	98-11v 50-6v 48-5v	98-9v 49-7v 49-2v	196-20v 99-13v 97-7v	98-10v 48-4v 50-6v	294-30v 147-17v 147-13v	141-8v 70-3v 71-5v	140-7v 67-5v 73-2v	281-15v 137-8v 144-7v	575-45v 284-25v 291-20v
10	Jersey	Total; David Le Quesne; Barry le Cheminant	99-7v 50-5v 49-2v	99-8v 49-2v 50-6v	198-15v 99-7v 99-8v	99-8v 50-5v 49-3v	297-23v 149-12v 148-11v	141-7v 73-4v 68-3v	134-6v 68-3v 66-3v	275-13v 141-7v 134-6v	572-36v 290-19v 282-17v
11	Guyana	Total; Lennox Braithwaite; Ransford Goodluck	99-11v 49-5v 50-6v	99-11v 50-5v 49-6v	198-22v 99-10v 99-12v	95-7v 47-4v 48-3v	293-29v 146-14v 147-15v	137-10v 72-6v 65-4v	133-9v 66-3v 67-6v	270-19v 138-9v 132-10v	563-48v 284-23v 279-25v
12	Falkland Islands	Total; Mark Dodd; Christian Berntsen	94-8v 49-5v 45-3v	97-6v 49-3v 48-3v	191-14v 98-8v 93-6v	94-7v 48-5v 46-2v	285-21v 146-13v 139-8v	135-8v 68-5v 67-3v	127-5v 60-2v 67-3v	262-13v 128-7v 134-6v	547-34v 274-20v 273-14v
13	Jamaica	Total; Denis Nelson; David C Rickman	94-4v 47-3v 47-1v	95-3v 49-1v 46-2v	189-7v 96-4v 93-3v	91-5v 45-3v 46-2v	280-12v 141-7v 139-5v	130-1v 67-1v 63-0v	120-5v 56-4v 64-1v	250-6v 123-5v 127-1v	530-18v 264-12v 266-6v
14	Barbados	Total; Richard Arthur; Jason Wood	89-10v 41-4v 48-6v	94-7v 46-4v 48-3v	183-17v 87-8v 96-9v	91-3v 45-1v 46-2v	274-20v 132-9v 142-11v	131-4v 64-2v 67-2v	119-1v 58-1v 61-0v	250-5v 122-3v 128-2v	524-25v 254-12v 270-13v
15	Antigua and Barbuda	Total; Edworth Benjamin; Desroy Maile	87-4v 45-3v 42-1v	90-2v 45-2v 45-0v	177-6v 90-5v 87-1v	89-5v 46-4v 43-1v	266-11v 136-9v 130-2v	122-5v 62-4v 60-1v	123-7v 58-1v 65-6v	245-12v 120-5v 125-7v	511-23v 256-14v 255-9v
16	Trinidad and Tobago	Total; Michael Perez; Delborn Joseph	84-4v 46-3v 38-1v	93-7v 46-3v 47-4v	177-11v 92-6v 85-5v	91-1v 43-0v 48-1v	268-12v 135-6v 133-6v	130-7v 66-4v 64-3v	102-1v 50-0v 52-1v	232-8v 116-4v 116-4v	500-20v 251-10v 249-10v
