= Scotland at the 2014 Commonwealth Games =

- CG code: SCO
- CGA: Commonwealth Games Scotland
- Website: goscotland.org

in Glasgow, Scotland
- Competitors: 310 in 17 sports
- Flag bearers: Opening: Euan Burton; Closing: Alex Marshall
- Medals Ranked 4th: Gold 19 Silver 15 Bronze 19 Total 53

Commonwealth Games appearances (overview)
- 1930; 1934; 1938; 1950; 1954; 1958; 1962; 1966; 1970; 1974; 1978; 1982; 1986; 1990; 1994; 1998; 2002; 2006; 2010; 2014; 2018; 2022; 2026; 2030

Scotland competed in the 2014 Commonwealth Games as the host nation in Glasgow from 23 July to 3 August 2014. A team of 310 athletes, consisting of 168 men and 142 women, were selected to compete in 17 disciplines.

== Medalists ==
Medal	Name	Sport	Event	Date
Gold	Kimberley Renicks	Judo	Women's 48 kg	24 July
Gold	Hannah Miley	Swimming	Women's 400 metre individual medley	24 July
Gold	Louise Renicks	Judo	Women's 52 kg	24 July
Gold	Ross Murdoch	Swimming	Men's 200 metre breaststroke	24 July
Gold	Daniel Wallace	Swimming	Men's 400 metre individual medley	25 July
Gold	Neil Fachie; Craig MacLean (Pilot)	Cycling	Men's tandem 1km time trial B	25 July
Gold	Sarah Clark	Judo	Women's 63 kg	25 July
Gold	Euan Burton	Judo	Men's -100 kg	26 July
Gold	Sarah Adlington	Judo	Women's +78 kg	26 July
Gold	Christopher Sherrington	Judo	Men's +100 kg	26 July
Gold	Neil Fachie; Craig MacLean (Pilot)	Cycling	Men's tandem sprint B	26 July
Gold	Paul Foster; Alex Marshall	Lawn bowls	Men's pairs	26 July
Gold	Libby Clegg; Mikhail Huggins (Guide)	Athletics	Women's 100 metres (T12)	28 July
Gold	Daniel Keatings	Gymnastics	Men's pommel horse	31 July
Gold	Paul Foster; Alex Marshall; David Peacock; Neil Speirs	Lawn bowls	Men's fours	1 August
Gold	Daniel Purvis	Gymnastics	Men's parallel bars	1 August
Gold	Darren Burnett	Lawn bowls	Men's singles	1 August
Gold	Charlie Flynn	Boxing	Men's lightweight	2 August
Gold	Josh Taylor	Boxing	Men's light welterweight	2 August
Silver	Aileen McGlynn; Louise Haston (Pilot)	Cycling	Women's tandem sprint B	24 July
Silver	Stephanie Inglis	Judo	Women's 57 kg	24 July
Silver	Michael Jamieson	Swimming	Men's 200 metre breaststroke	24 July
Silver	Robert Conway; Ron McArthur (Guide); Irene Edgar; David Thomas (Guide)	Lawn bowls	Mixed para-sport pairs	26 July
Silver	Matthew Purssey	Judo	Men's 90 kg	26 July
Silver	Drew Christie	Shooting	Men's skeet	26 July
Silver	Aileen McGlynn; Louise Haston (Pilot)	Cycling	Women's tandem 1km time trial B	27 July
Silver	Daniel Wallace; Stephen Milne; Duncan Scott; Robbie Renwick	Swimming	Men's 4 × 200 metre freestyle relay	27 July
Silver	Frank Baines; Adam Cox; Liam Davie; Daniel Keatings; Daniel Purvis	Gymnastics	Men's artistic team all-around	29 July
Silver	Jennifer McIntosh	Shooting	Women's 50 metre rifle three positions	29 July
Silver	Daniel Wallace	Swimming	Men's 200 metre individual medley	29 July
Silver	Daniel Keatings	Gymnastics	Men's artistic individual all-around	30 July
Silver	Eilidh Child	Athletics	Women's 400 metres hurdles	31 July
Silver	Lynsey Sharp	Athletics	Women's 800 metres	1 August
Silver	Kirsty Gilmour	Badminton	Women's singles	3 August
Bronze	John Buchanan	Judo	Men's 60 kg	24 July
Bronze	James Millar	Judo	Men's 66 kg	24 July
Bronze	Connie Ramsay	Judo	Women's 57 kg	24 July
Bronze	Sally Conway	Judo	Women's 70 kg	25 July
Bronze	Corrie Scott	Swimming	Women's 50 metre breaststroke	25 July
Bronze	Andrew Burns	Judo	Men's 90 kg	26 July
Bronze	Angus McLeod; Ian Shaw	Shooting	Queen's prize pairs	26 July
Bronze	Ross Murdoch	Swimming	Men's 100 metre breaststroke	26 July
Bronze	Katie Archibald	Cycling	Women's points race	27 July
Bronze	Erraid Davies	Swimming	Women's 100 metre breaststroke SB9	27 July
Bronze	Hannah Miley	Swimming	Women's 200 metre individual medley	27 July
Bronze	Jennifer McIntosh	Shooting	Women's 50 metre rifle prone	28 July
Bronze	Mark Dry	Athletics	Men's hammer throw	29 July
Bronze	Viorel Etko	Wrestling	Men's freestyle 61 kg	30 July
Bronze	Alex Gladkov	Wrestling	Men's freestyle 65 kg	31 July
Bronze	Daniel Purvis	Gymnastics	Men's rings	31 July
Bronze	Reece McFadden	Boxing	Men's flyweight	1 August
Bronze	Stephen Lavelle	Boxing	Men's heavyweight	1 August
Bronze	Imogen Bankier; Robert Blair	Badminton	Mixed doubles	2 August

Medals by sport
Sport	gold	silver	bronze	Total
Athletics	1	2	1	4
Badminton	0	1	1	2
Boxing	2	0	2	4
Cycling	2	2	1	5
Gymnastics	2	2	1	5
Judo	6	2	5	13
Lawn bowls	3	1	0	4
Shooting	0	2	2	4
Swimming	3	3	4	10
Wrestling	0	0	2	2
Total	19	15	19	53

== Athletics ==
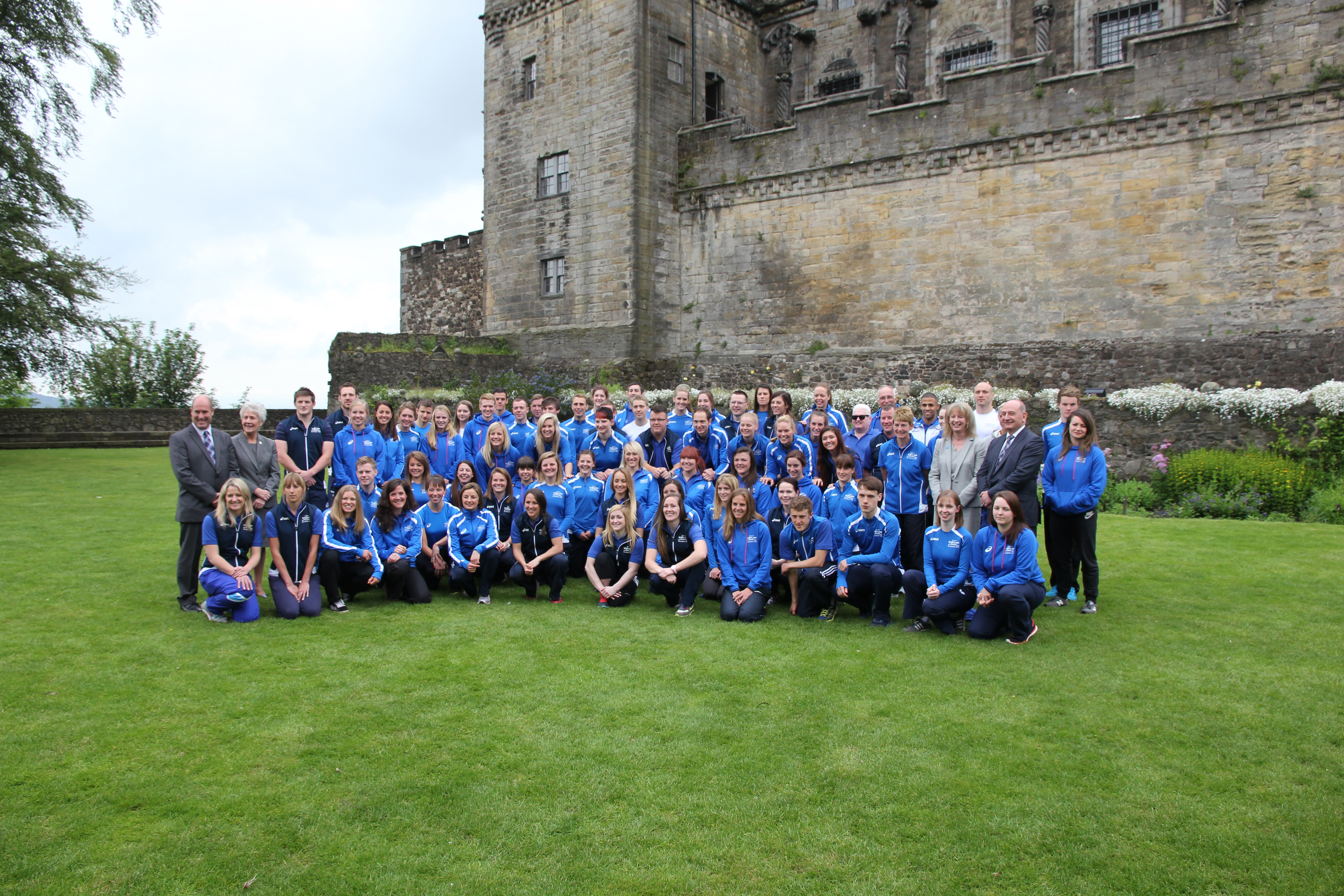
Members of Team Scotland at a publicity event at Stirling Castle in June 2014

Key

- Note–Ranks given for track events are within the athlete's heat only
- Q = Qualified for the next round
- q = Qualified for the next round as a fastest loser or, in field events, by position without achieving the qualifying target
- NR = National record
- N/A = Round not applicable for the event

Men
Track & road events

Athlete	Event	Heat		Semifinal		Final	
Athlete	Event	Result	Rank	Result	Rank	Result	Rank
Lewis Clow	100 m (T37)	13.41	10	—N/a		Did not advance	
Jason MacLean	100 m (T37)	12.96	5 Q	—N/a		12.93	5
Guy Learmonth	800 m	1:47.85	4 q	1:47.78	9 Q	1:46.69	6
David Bishop	1500 m	3:43.10	15	—N/a		Did not advance	
Chris O'Hare	1500 m	3:40.80	9 Q	—N/a		3:40.63	6
Jake Wightman	1500 m	3:43.87	16	—N/a		Did not advance	
Luke Caldwell	5000 m	—N/a				13:43.75	13
Luke Caldwell	10000 m	—N/a				28:47.39	14
Callum Hawkins	10000 m	—N/a				29:12.52	20
Andrew Lemoncello	10000 m	—N/a				28:36.63	12
Stephen Lisgo	3000 m steeplechase	—N/a				9:05.13	8
Kris Robertson; Jamie Bowie; Greg Louden; Grant Plenderleith	4 × 400 m relay	3:03.94	4 q	—N/a		3:04.07	5
Derek Hawkins	Marathon	—N/a				2:14:15	9
Ross Houston	Marathon	—N/a				2:18:42	16

Field events

Athlete	Event	Qualification		Final	
Athlete	Event	Distance	Rank	Distance	Rank
Raymond Bobrownicki	High jump	2.20	12 q	2.21	=9
Allan Smith	High jump	DNS			
David Smith	High jump	2.11	=14	Did not advance	
Gregor MacLean	Pole vault	—N/a		NM	—
Jax Thoirs	Pole vault	—N/a		5.45	4
Angus McInroy	Discus throw	57.28	11 q	54.12	12
Nick Percy	Discus throw	56.71	13	Did not advance	
James Campbell	Javelin throw	70.78	13	Did not advance	
Chris Bennett	Hammer throw	68.01	7 q	61.92	12
Mark Dry	Hammer throw	71.62	3 Q	71.64	3rd place, bronze medalist(s)
Andrew Frost	Hammer throw	66.54	9 q	66.63	9

Women
Track & road events

Athlete	Event	Heat		Semifinal		Final	
Athlete	Event	Result	Rank	Result	Rank	Result	Rank
Libby Clegg; Guide: Mikhail Huggins	100 m (T12)	12.23	1 Q	—N/a		12.20	1st place, gold medalist(s)
Emily Dudgeon	800 m	2:02.35	3 Q	2:03.00	10	Did not advance	
Laura Muir	800 m	DNS					
Lynsey Sharp	800 m	2:03.04	8 Q	2:02.28	5 q	2:01.34	2nd place, silver medalist(s)
Laura Muir	1500 m	4:05.19	3 Q	—N/a		4:14.21	11
Meggan Dawson-Farrell	1500 m (T54)	3:58.78	4 q	—N/a		4:07.86	7
Samantha Kinghorn	1500 m (T54)	4:03.41	7 Q	—N/a		4:03.95	5
Beth Potter	5000 m	—N/a				15:44.38	9
Stephanie Twell	5000 m	—N/a				16:30.66	14
Laura Whittle	5000 m	—N/a				15:33.72	6
Beth Potter	10000 m	—N/a				32:33.36	5
Eilidh Child	400 m hurdles	55.56	2 Q	—N/a		55.02	2nd place, silver medalist(s)
Eilish McColgan	3000 m steeplechase	—N/a				9:44.65	6
Lennie Waite	3000 m steeplechase	—N/a				9:51.93	10
Kirsten McAslan; Diane Ramsay; Gemma Nicol; Zoey Clark	4 × 400 m relay	3:33.91	9	—N/a		Did not advance	
Hayley Haining	Marathon	—N/a				2:40:40	13
Susan Partridge	Marathon	—N/a				2:32:18	6
Joasia Zakrzewski	Marathon	—N/a				2:45:29	14

Field events

Athlete	Event	Qualification		Final	
Athlete	Event	Distance	Position	Distance	Position
Jade Nimmo	Long jump	6.23	14	Did not advance	
Sarah Warnock	Long jump	6.22	15	Did not advance	
Rachel McKenzie	High jump	1.76	16	Did not advance	
Jayne Nisbet	High jump	1.85	=1 q	1.78	=10
Emma Nuttall	High jump	1.81	=14	Did not advance	
Henrietta Paxton	Pole vault	—N/a		NM	—
Alison Rodger	Shot put	—N/a		14.76	10
Kirsty Yates	Shot put	—N/a		16.42	8
Kirsty Law	Discus throw	54.68	8 q	52.33	11
Rachel Hunter	Hammer throw	61.91	6 q	63.29	7
Susan McKelvie	Hammer throw	62.00	5 q	63.76	6
Myra Perkins	Hammer throw	57.70	12 q	60.16	10

== Badminton ==
Individual

Athlete	Event	Round of 64	Round of 32	Round of 16	Quarterfinals	Semifinals	Final	Rank
Athlete	Event	Opposition Score	Opposition Score	Opposition Score	Opposition Score	Opposition Score	Opposition Score	Rank
Kieran Merrilees	Men's singles	R Cribb (NFI); W 2–0	V Munga (KEN); W 2–0	T Murphy (NIR); W 2–0	R Ouseph (ENG); L 0–2	Did not advance		
Kirsty Gilmour	Women's singles	Bye	V Kessler (AUS); W 2–0	Y Louison (MRI); W 2–0	M Chan (NZL); W 2–0	Tee J Y (MAS); W 2–0	M Li (CAN); L 0–2	2nd place, silver medalist(s)
Robert Blair & Paul van Rietvelde	Men's doubles	Bye	M Sarim & H Zaki (MDV); W 2–0	A Liu & D Ng (CAN); W 2–0	D Chrisnanta & C Triyachart (SIN); L 0–2	Did not advance		
Martin Campbell & Patrick MacHugh	Men's doubles	Bye	A Rasheed & N Sharafuddeen (MDV); W 2–0	R Middleton & R Smith (AUS); L 0–2	Did not advance			
Imogen Bankier & Kirsty Gilmour	Women's doubles	—N/a	G Adcock & L Smith (ENG); L 1–2	Did not advance				
Imogen Bankier & Robert Blair	Mixed doubles	Bye	Goh V S & Lim Y L (MAS); W 2–1	T Hee & Fu M (SIN); W 2–0	D Ng & P Chan (CAN); W 2–0	C Adcock & G Adcock (ENG); L 0–2	Chan P S & Lai P J (MAS); W 2–0	3rd place, bronze medalist(s)
Jillie Cooper & Paul van Rietvelde	Mixed doubles	A Liu & M Li (CAN); L 0–2	Did not advance					

Mixed team

Pool C

Pos	Team	Pld	W	L	GF	GA	GD	PF	PA	PD	Pts	Qualification
1	Scotland	3	3	0	30	0	+30	636	283	+353	3	Quarterfinals
2	New Zealand	3	2	1	20	10	+10	562	408	+154	2	
3	Guernsey	3	1	2	7	26	−19	409	666	−257	1	
4	Seychelles	3	0	3	6	27	−21	410	660	−250	0	

Source: glasgow2014.com

Scotland
5
Commonwealth Arena, Glasgow
24 July

Seychelles
0

			1	2	3
1	(Scotland) (Seychelles)	Martin Campbell / Jillie Cooper; Juliette Ah-Wan / Georgie Cupidon	21; 11	21; 5
2	(Scotland) (Seychelles)	Kieran Merrilees; Kervin Ghislain	21; 2	21; 8
3	(Scotland) (Seychelles)	Rebekka Findlay; Allisen Camille	21; 7	21; 11
4	(Scotland) (Seychelles)	Patrick Machugh / Martin Campbell; Georgie Cupidon / Steve Malcouzanne	21; 10	21; 4
5	(Scotland) (Seychelles)	Imogen Bankier / Caitlin Pringle; Juliette Ah-Wan / Allisen Camille	21; 14	21; 9

Scotland
5
Commonwealth Arena, Glasgow
24 July

Guernsey
0

			1	2	3
1	(Scotland) (Guernsey)	Martin Campbell / Jillie Cooper; Stuart Hardy / Gayle Lloyd	21; 7	21; 7
2	(Scotland) (Guernsey)	Kieran Merrilees; Daniel Penney	21; 7	21; 4
3	(Scotland) (Guernsey)	Kirsty Gilmour; Elena Johnson	21; 4	21; 7
4	(Scotland) (Guernsey)	Robert Blair / Paul van Rietvelde; Daniel Penney / Stuart Hardy	21; 3	21; 7
5	(Scotland) (Guernsey)	Jillie Cooper / Rebekka Findlay; Elena Johnson / Gayle Lloyd	21; 8	21; 7

Scotland
5
Commonwealth Arena, Glasgow
25 July

New Zealand
0

			1	2	3
1	(Scotland) (New Zealand)	Robert Blair / Imogen Bankier; Oliver Leydon-Davis / Susannah Leydon-Davis	21; 8	21; 10
2	(Scotland) (New Zealand)	Kieran Merrilees; Joe Wu	21; 13	21; 17
3	(Scotland) (New Zealand)	Kirsty Gilmour; Michelle Chan	21; 15	23; 21
4	(Scotland) (New Zealand)	Robert Blair / Paul van Rietvelde; Kevin Dennerly-Minturn / Oliver Leydon-Davis	23; 21	23; 21
5	(Scotland) (New Zealand)	Imogen Bankier / Kirsty Gilmour; Anna Rankin / Madeleine Stapleton	21; 4	21; 11

Quarterfinals

Malaysia
3
Commonwealth Arena, Glasgow
26 July

Scotland
1

			1	2	3
1	(Malaysia) (Scotland)	Chan Peng Soon / Lai Pei Jing; Robert Blair / Imogen Bankier	24; 22	9; 21	11; 21
2	(Malaysia) (Scotland)	Chong Wei Feng; Kieran Merrilees	21; 16	21; 14
3	(Malaysia) (Scotland)	Tee Jing Yi; Kirsty Gilmour	21; 10	21; 15
4	(Malaysia) (Scotland)	Tan Wee Kiong / Goh V Shem; Martin Campbell / Patrick MacHugh	21; 12	21; 15

== Boxing ==
Men

Athlete	Event	Round of 32	Round of 16	Quarterfinals	Semifinals	Final	
Athlete	Event	Opposition Result	Opposition Result	Opposition Result	Opposition Result	Opposition Result	Rank
Aqeel Ahmed	Light flyweight	Bye	A Keya (KEN); W 3–0	D Singh (IND); L 0–3	Did not advance		
Reece McFadden	Flyweight	A Selby (WAL); W 3–0	C Edwards (ENG); W 3–0	O Oteng (BOT); W 3–0	A Moloney (AUS); L 1–2	Did not advance	3rd place, bronze medalist(s)
Joe Ham	Bantamweight	Bye	N Nadir (PAK); W 3–0	Q Ashfaq (ENG); L 0–3	Did not advance		
Charlie Flynn	Lightweight	Bye	N Cooney (AUS); W 3–0	J Lartey (GHA); W 2–1	J Cordina (WAL); W 2–0	J Fitzpatrick (NIR); W 3–0	1st place, gold medalist(s)
Josh Taylor	Light welterweight	K Bagwasi (BOT); W 3–0	R Colin (MRI); W 3–0	Z Davies (WAL); W 3–0	S Maxwell (ENG); W 3–0	J Jonas (NAM); W 3–0	1st place, gold medalist(s)
Lewis Benson	Welterweight	B Morgan (NZL); L 1–2	Did not advance				
Kieran Smith	Middleweight	Bye	A Fowler (ENG); L 0–3	Did not advance			
Scott Forrest	Light heavyweight	Bye	D Nyika (NZL); L 0–3	Did not advance			
Stephen Lavelle	Heavyweight	—N/a	K Davies (WAL); W 3–0	A Singh (IND); W 3–0	D Light (NZL); L 0–3	Did not advance	3rd place, bronze medalist(s)
Ross Henderson	Super heavyweight	—N/a	P Parveen Kumar (IND); W 3–0	J Joyce (ENG); L TKO	Did not advance		

== Cycling ==
=== Mountain biking ===
Athlete	Event	Time	Rank
Grant Ferguson	Men's cross-country	1:41:35	5
Kenta Gallagher	Men's cross-country	1:43:45	10
Gareth Montgomerie	Men's cross-country	1:46:28	11
Lee Craigie	Women's cross-country	1:43:36	7
Kerry MacPhee	Women's cross-country	1:49:48	13
Jessie Roberts	Women's cross-country	1:47:32	11

=== Road ===
Men

Athlete	Event	Time	Rank
Andrew Fenn	Road race	DNF	—
Grant Ferguson	Road race	DNF	—
James McCallum	Road race	DNF	—
David Millar	Road race	4:23:26	11
Evan Oliphant	Road race	DNF	—
Jack Pullar	Road race	DNF	—
David Millar	Time trial	49:56.23	8

Women

Athlete	Event	Time	Rank
Katie Archibald	Road race	2:41:02	7
Anne Ewing	Road race	2:51:00	27
Charline Joiner	Road race	DNF	—
Gemma Neil	Road race	2:51:00	23
Eileen Roe	Road race	DNF	—
Claire Thomas	Road race	DNF	—
Katie Archibald	Time trial	43:30.01	5
Lucy Coldwell	Time trial	44:03.40	8
Anna Turvey	Time trial	44:08.62	9

=== Track ===
Keirin

Athlete	Event	1st round	Repechage	Semifinals	Final
Athlete	Event	Rank	Rank	Rank	Rank
John Paul	Men's keirin	2 Q	—N/a	6	Did not advance
Chris Pritchard	Men's keirin	1 Q	—N/a	4	Did not advance
Callum Skinner	Men's keirin	4 R	3	Did not advance	

Points race

Athlete	Event	Qualification		Final	
Athlete	Event	Points	Rank	Points	Rank
Evan Oliphant	Men's point race	3	9 Q	–20	10
Alistair Rutherford	Men's point race	6	8 Q	DNF	
Mark Stewart	Men's point race	6	6 Q	–34	11
Katie Archibald	Women's points race	—N/a		33	3rd place, bronze medalist(s)
Charline Joiner	Women's points race	—N/a		0	19
Eileen Roe	Women's points race	—N/a		0	18

Pursuit

Athlete	Event	Qualification		Final	
Athlete	Event	Time	Rank	Opponent results	Rank
Mark Stewart	Men's individual pursuit	4:32.279	11	Did not advance	
Katie Archibald	Women's individual pursuit	3:33.526	4 Q	A Cure (AUS); L 3:37.078	4
Anna Turvey	Women's individual pursuit	3:40.525	12	Did not advance	

Scratch

Athlete	Event	Qualification	Final
Athlete	Event	Rank	Rank
James McCallum	Men's scratch	8 Q	DNF
Evan Oliphant	Men's scratch	2 Q	DNF
Mark Stewart	Men's scratch	9 Q	6
Katie Archibald	Women's scratch	—N/a	5
Charline Joiner	Women's scratch	—N/a	17
Eileen Roe	Women's scratch	—N/a	8

Sprint

Athlete	Event	Qualification		Round 1	Repechage	Quarterfinals	Semifinals	Final	Rank
Athlete	Event	Time Speed (km/h)	Rank	Opposition Time Speed (km/h)	Opposition Time Speed (km/h)	Opposition Time Speed (km/h)	Opposition Time Speed (km/h)	Opposition Time Speed (km/h)	Rank
John Paul	Men's sprint	10.308 (69.848)	14	Did not advance					
Chris Pritchard	Men's sprint	10.412 (69.150)	18	Did not advance					
Callum Skinner	Men's sprint	10.198 (70.602)	10 Q	S Webster (NZL); L	J Kenny (ENG); L Oliva (WAL); L	Did not advance			
Jenny Davis	Women's sprint	11.580 (62.176)	7 Q	—N/a		A Meares (NZL); L, L	Did not advance		
Eleanor Richardson	Women's sprint	12.211 (58.963)	9	—N/a		Did not advance			
Neil Fachie; Craig MacLean (pilot)	Men's sprint B2	10.213 (70.498)	2 Q	—N/a			M Ellis & I Williams (pilot) (WAL); W 10.993, W 10.981	K Modra & J Niblett (pilot) (AUS); L, W 10.920, W 10.874	1st place, gold medalist(s)
Aileen McGlynn; Louise Haston (pilot)	Women's sprint B2	11.419 (63.052)	2 Q	—N/a			B O'Connor & B Hargrave (pilot) (AUS); W 12.274, W 12.199	S Thornhill & H Scott (pilot) (ENG); L, L	2nd place, silver medalist(s)
Laura Cluxton; Fiona Duncan (pilot)	Women's sprint B2	11.929 (60.357)	6	—N/a			Did not advance		
Jonny Biggin; Chris Pritchard; Callum Skinner	Men's team sprint	45.501	5	—N/a				Did not advance	

Time trial

Athlete	Event	Time	Rank
Bruce Croall	Men's 1km time trial	1:03.356	8
Jenny Davis	Women's 500m time trial	36.179	9
Eleanor Richardson	Women's 500m time trial	36.147	8
Neil Fachie; Craig MacLean (pilot)	Men's time trial B2	1:02.096	1st place, gold medalist(s)
Aileen McGlynn; Louise Haston (pilot)	Women's time trial B2	1:09.771	2nd place, silver medalist(s)
Laura Cluxton; Fiona Duncan (pilot)	Women's time trial B2	1:12.132	5

== Diving ==
Men

Athlete	Event	Preliminaries		Final	
Athlete	Event	Points	Rank	Points	Rank
James Heatly	1 m springboard	317.65	10 Q	345.60	9
James Heatly	3 m springboard	397.65	5 Q	393.35	8

Women

Athlete	Event	Preliminaries		Final	
Athlete	Event	Points	Rank	Points	Rank
Grace Reid	1 m springboard	257.90	7 Q	269.40	5
Grace Reid	3 m springboard	281.80	10 Q	297.50	9

== Gymnastics ==
=== Artistic ===
Men
All-around

Athlete	Event	Qualification								Final							
Athlete	Event	F	PH	R	V	PB	HB	Total	Rank	F	PH	R	V	PB	HB	Total	Rank
Frank Baines	Individual	14.066	13.600	13.975	14.566 Q	14.966 Q	14.633 Q	85.806	4 Q	14.633	12.825	13.966	13.900	14.066	12.966	82.356	6
Adam Cox	Individual	13.500	12.666	—N/a	13.733 Q	13.133	—N/a	—N/a		—N/a							
Liam Davie	Individual	—N/a	—N/a	12.400	—N/a	—N/a	12.133	—N/a		—N/a							
Daniel Keatings	Individual	14.966 Q	14.533 Q	13.900	14.133	14.100	14.566 Q	86.198	3 Q	14.800	15.533	14.100	14.333	14.766	14.766	88.298	2nd place, silver medalist(s)
Daniel Purvis	Individual	13.900	13.600 Q	14.700 Q	14.833	14.733 Q	13.833	85.599	5 Q	15.300	12.833	14.400	14.666	14.200	13.466	84.865	4
Frank Baines; Adam Cox; Liam Davie; Daniel Keatings; Daniel Purvis	Team	—N/a								42.932	41.733	42.575	43.532	43.799	43.032	257.603	2nd place, silver medalist(s)

Individual Finals

Athlete	Event	Total	Rank
Daniel Keatings	Floor	14.533	4
Daniel Keatings	Pommel horse	16.058	1st place, gold medalist(s)
Daniel Purvis	Pommel horse	14.516	5
Daniel Purvis	Rings	14.766	3rd place, bronze medalist(s)
Frank Baines	Vault	14.016	5
Adam Cox	Vault	13.274	7
Frank Baines	Parallel bars	14.866	4
Daniel Purvis	Parallel bars	15.533	1st place, gold medalist(s)
Frank Baines	Horizontal bar	14.566	4
Daniel Keatings	Horizontal bar	13.366	6

Women
All-around

Athlete	Event	Qualification						Final					
Athlete	Event	F	V	UB	BB	Total	Rank	F	V	UB	BB	Total	Rank
Cara Kennedy	Individual	12.533	13.133	—N/a	11.500	—N/a		—N/a					
Erin McLachlan	Individual	—N/a	13.300	11.966	12.600	—N/a		—N/a					
Amy Regan	Individual	12.833	13.966 R1	11.766	11.866	50.431	15 Q	13.433	13.666	12.100	11.233	50.432	14
Carly Smith	Individual	11.566	—N/a	11.000	—N/a	—N/a		—N/a					
Emma White	Individual	12.766	14.033 Q	12.466 R2	11.066	50.331	17 Q	13.066	13.900	11.666	12.900	51.532	10
Cara Kennedy; Erin McLachlan; Amy Regan; Carly Smith; Emma White	Team	—N/a						38.132	41.299	36.198	35.966	151.595	5

Individual Finals

Athlete	Event	Total	Rank
Emma White	Vault	13.550	8

=== Rhythmic ===
Team

Athlete	Event	Final					
Athlete	Event	Hoop	Ball	Clubs	Ribbon	Total	Rank
Becky Bee; Lauren Brash; Victoria Clow	Team	33.100	29.675	33.825	31.500	109.625	7

Individual

Athlete	Event	Qualification						Final					
Athlete	Event	Hoop	Ball	Clubs	Ribbon	Total	Rank	Hoop	Ball	Clubs	Ribbon	Total	Rank
Lauren Brash	Individual	11.300	11.200	12.450	11.800	46.750	18 Q	10.800	11.350	11.400	11.325	44.875	16
Becky Bee	Individual	11.325	9.100	11.025	9.400	40.850	25	Did not advance					
Victoria Clow	Individual	10.475	9.375	10.350	10.300	40.500	27	Did not advance					

== Hockey ==
=== Men's tournament ===
Pool A

Pos	Team	Pld	W	D	L	GF	GA	GD	Pts	Qualification
1	Australia	4	4	0	0	22	3	+19	12	Semi-finals
2	India	4	3	0	1	16	9	+7	9	Semi-finals
3	South Africa	4	2	0	2	9	12	−3	6	
4	Scotland	4	1	0	3	6	16	−10	3	
5	Wales	4	0	0	4	6	19	−13	0	

Source: FIH
Rules for classification: 1) points; 2) goal difference; 3) goals scored; 4) head-to-head result.

25 July 2014
11:00

South Africa	2–0	Scotland
Cronje 41'; Malgraff 66'	Report

Umpires:
Haider Rasool (PAK)
Adam Kearns (AUS)

26 July 2014
16:00

India	6–2	Scotland
G. Singh 6'; Raghunath 23', 45'; R. Singh 37', 48'; Chandi 40'	Report	Bain 56'; Parkes 69'

Umpires:
Gareth Greenfield (NZL)
Eric Koh (MAS)

28 July 2014
11:00

Scotland	4–3	Wales
Grassick 14'; McIntyre 40'; Coultas 41'; Parkes 61'	Report	Gay 1', 3', 31'

Umpires:
Peter Wright (RSA)
Raghu Prasad (IND)

31 July 2014
14:00

Australia	5–0	Scotland
Ciriello 19'; Gohdes 23', 25'; Govers 38'; Whetton 43'	Report

Umpires:
Lim Hong Zhen (SIN)
Will Drury (WAL)

=== Women's tournament ===
Pool B

Team	Pld	W	D	L	GF	GA	GD	Pts	Qualification
Australia	4	4	0	0	25	0	+25	12	Semi-finals
England	4	3	0	1	9	4	+5	9	Semi-finals
Scotland	4	2	0	2	5	11	−6	6	
Malaysia	4	0	1	3	0	11	−11	1	
Wales	4	0	1	3	0	13	−13	1	

25 July 2014
16:00

Scotland	2–0	Malaysia
Wyllie 26', 40'	Report

Umpires:
Aleesha Unka (NZL)
Miskarmalia Ariffin (SIN)

27 July 2014
09:00

Scotland	0–9	Australia
	Report	Kenny 3', 20', 47'; Nelson 19'; Flanagan 53', 60'; Nanscawen 55'; Smith 63'; Taylor 67'

Umpires:
Dino Willox (WAL)
Ayana McClean (TRI)

28 July 2014
16:00

Wales	0–2	Scotland
	Report	Bell 9'; Clement 27'

Umpires:
Ayanna McClean (TTO)
Annelize Rostron (RSA)

30 July 2014
09:00

Scotland	1–2	England
Kidd 32'	Report	Danson 16'; Townsend 28'

Umpires:
Wendy Stewart (CAN)
Miskarmalia Ariffin (SIN)

== Judo ==
Men

Athlete	Event	Round of 32	Round of 16	Quarterfinals	Semifinals	Repechage	Final / BM	
Athlete	Event	Opposition Result	Opposition Result	Opposition Result	Opposition Result	Opposition Result	Opposition Result	Rank
John Buchanan	−60 kg	—N/a	Laurent (MRI); W 0200–0001	A McKenzie (ENG); L 0002-0011	Did not advance	Agudoo (GHA); W 1000–0001	Le Grange (RSA); W 1001-0001	3rd place, bronze medalist(s)
James Millar	−66 kg	Bye	Mahit (VAN); W 1000–0000	Nama Etoga (CMR); W 0012–0002	Oates (ENG); L 0002-1001	—N/a	Punza (ZAM); W 1001–0002	3rd place, bronze medalist(s)
Patrick Dawson	−73 kg	Hell Bapou (CMR); W 101–000	Gosiewski (ENG); W 0002–0003	van Zyl (RSA); L 0001–1001	Did not advance	Nartey (GHA); W 0101-0102	Bensted (AUS); L 0000–1000	5
Andrew Burns	−90 kg	—N/a	Dolassem (CMR); W 1101–0003	Piontek (RSA); L 0001-1011	Did not advance	Wickramage (SRI); W 1000–0001	Anthony (AUS); W 0021-0010	3rd place, bronze medalist(s)
Matthew Purssey	−90 kg	—N/a	Singh (IND); W 1001-0000	Ombiongno (CMR); W 1002-0004	Anthony (AUS); W 0102–0001	Bye	Piontek (RSA); L 000–0010	2nd place, silver medalist(s)
Euan Burton	−100 kg	—N/a	Kengara (KEN); W 1000-0000	Dugasse (SEY); W 1012-0003	Koster (NZL); W 1100-0001	Bye	Hussain Shah (PAK); W 1100-0000	1st place, gold medalist(s)
Christopher Sherrington	+100 kg	—N/a	Bye	McNeill (NIR); W 1000-0000	Rosser (NZL); W 1001-0000	Bye	Snyman (RSA); W 1000-0001	1st place, gold medalist(s)

Women

Athlete	Event	Round of 16	Quarterfinal	Semifinal	Repechage	Final / BM	
Athlete	Event	Opposition Result	Opposition Result	Opposition Result	Opposition Result	Opposition Result	Rank
Kimberley Renicks	−48 kg	Bye	Monabang (CMR); W1000-0001	Okey (BAR); W100-000	Bye	Likmabam (IND); W1000-0002	1st place, gold medalist(s)
Louise Renicks	−52 kg	Bye	Francis-Méthot (CAN); W0100-0003	Thoudam (IND); W0000-0002	Bye	Edwards (ENG); W1003-0004	1st place, gold medalist(s)
Stephanie Inglis	−57 kg	Nik Azman (MAS); W1000-0000	Manuel (NZL); W0011-0003	Sitcheping (CMR); W0002-0003	Bye	Davis (ENG); L0001-1011	2nd place, silver medalist(s)
Connie Ramsay	−57 kg	Bye	Klimkait (CAN); L0001-0113	Did not advance	Powell (WAL); W1000-0003	Sitcheping (CMR); W1011-0000	3rd place, bronze medalist(s)
Sarah Clark	−63 kg	Bye	Choudhary (IND); W1000-0002	Haecker (AUS); W1000-0000	Bye	Wezeu Dombeu (CMR); W1000-0000	1st place, gold medalist(s)
Sally Conway	−70 kg	Bye	Collins (AUS); W1000-0000	Fletcher (ENG); L0010-0020	Bye	Huidrom (IND); W0000-0003	3rd place, bronze medalist(s)
Sarah Adlington	+78 kg	Bye	Bye	Ratugi (KEN); W1002-0004	Bye	Myers (ENG); W0013-0000	1st place, gold medalist(s)

== Lawn bowls ==
Men

Athlete	Event	Group Stage						Quarterfinal	Semifinal	Final	
Athlete	Event	Opposition Score	Opposition Score	Opposition Score	Opposition Score	Opposition Score	Rank	Opposition Score	Opposition Score	Opposition Score	Rank
Darren Burnett	Singles	M Pita (COK); W 21–0	M Le Ber (GUE); W 21–12	W E Esterhuizen (NAM); L 19–21	H Musonda (ZAM); W 21–11	B Donnelly (RSA); W 21–6	1 Q	M McHugh (NIR); W 21–20	A Sherriff (AUS); W 21–15	R Bester (CAN); W 21–9	1st place, gold medalist(s)
Paul Foster; Alex Marshall	Pairs	Zambia; W 25–4	Niue; W 21–7	South Africa; W 16–15	New Zealand; W 19–11	—N/a	1 Q	New Zealand; W 25–9	England; W 16–15	Malaysia; W 20–3	1st place, gold medalist(s)
Darren Burnett; David Peacock; Neil Speirs	Triples	India; W 27–6	Niue; W 32–6	Namibia; W 24–18	Wales; L 10–17	—N/a	2 Q	Northern Ireland; L 12–19	Did not advance		
Paul Foster; Alex Marshall; David Peacock; Neil Speirs	Fours	Niue; W 22–9	Kenya; W 16–10	Fiji; W 17–15	Wales; W 12–9	—N/a	1 Q	South Africa; W 15–7	Australia; W 15–10	England; W 16–8	1st place, gold medalist(s)

Women

Athlete	Event	Group Stage						Quarterfinal	Semifinal	Final	
Athlete	Event	Opposition Score	Opposition Score	Opposition Score	Opposition Score	Opposition Score	Rank	Opposition Score	Opposition Score	Opposition Score	Rank
Caroline Brown	Singles	L K Beere (GUE); W 21–5	C Taylor (WAL); W 21–18	M Like (ZAM); W 21–5	B McGreal (IOM); W 21–8	K Cottrell (AUS); L 11–21	1 Q	N Melmore (ENG); L 20–21	Did not advance		
Caroline Brown; Lorraine Malloy	Pairs	Samoa; W 25–9	Zambia; T 21–21	Norfolk Island; W 14–13	South Africa; L 14–16	—N/a	3	Did not advance			
Lauren Baillie; Claire Johnston; Margaret Letham	Triples	Papua New Guinea; W 22–8	Northern Ireland; W 19–11	England; L 9–21	—N/a		2 Q	South Africa; L 12–21	Did not advance		
Lauren Baillie; Claire Johnston; Margaret Letham; Lorraine Malloy	Fours	Cook Islands; W 16–11	Papua New Guinea; W 27–7	Jersey; L 7–15	Australia; W 16–13	—N/a	1 Q	Jersey; W 16–14	South Africa; L 12–15	New Zealand; L 15–21	4

Para-bowls

Athlete	Event	Group Stage				Semifinal	Final	
Athlete	Event	Opposition Score	Opposition Score	Opposition Score	Rank	Opposition Score	Opposition Score	Rank
Robert Conway; Guide: Ron McArthur; Irene Edgar; Guide: David Thomas	Pairs	Wales; W 16–6	England; W 10–7	Australia; W 15–9	1 Q	Australia; W 18–14	South Africa; L 10–14	2nd place, silver medalist(s)
Billy Allan; Michael Simpson; Kevin Wallace	Triples	Malaysia; W 25–6	Wales; W 16–8	England; W 22–14	1 Q	New Zealand; L 9–13	England; L 12–16	4

== Netball ==
Pool A

Team	Pld	W	L	PF	PA	PD	Pts	Qualification
New Zealand	5	5	0	337	151	+186	10	Semi-finals
Jamaica	5	4	1	344	184	+160	8	Semi-finals
Malawi	5	3	2	299	244	+55	6	
Northern Ireland	5	2	3	211	286	−75	4	
Scotland	5	1	4	165	268	−103	2	
Saint Lucia	5	0	5	141	364	−223	0	

Source: glasgow2014.com

25 July 2014
17:00

Report
Scotland
58 – 30
Saint Lucia

SECC Precinct
Umpires:
Theresa Prince (RSA)
Ian Fuller (ENG)
Reserve umpire:
Terrence Peart (JAM)
Gallagher 21/25 (84%)
MacDonald 22/27 (81%)
Pettitt 10/12 (83%)
Sole 5/6 (83%)

Hippolyte 0/4 (0%)
Laurencin 20/25 (80%)
Maxwell 10/16 (63%)

26 July 2014
11:30

Report
Scotland
14 – 71
New Zealand

SECC Precinct
Umpires:
Tracy Smith (ENG)
Gary Burgess (ENG)
Reserve umpire:
Terrence Peart (JAM)
Gallagher 3/7 (43%)
MacDonald 1/3 (33%)
McNeill 0/2 (0%)
Pettitt 10/16 (63%)

Brown 14/22 (64%)
Halpenny 14/18 (78%)
Latu 30/31 (97%)
Tutaia 13/17 (76%)

27 July 2014
09:30

Report
Jamaica
68 – 26
Scotland

SECC Precinct
Umpires:
Theresa Prince (RSA)
Joshua Bowring (AUS)
Reserve umpire:
Gary Burgess (ENG)
Aiken 42/49 (86%)
Harwood 15/21 (71%)
Reid 11/14 (79%)

Gallagher 6/10 (60%)
MacDonald 12/17 (71%)
Pettitt 5/5 (100%)
Sole 3/5 (60%)

29 July 2014
19:00

Report
Malawi
62 – 35
Scotland

SECC Precinct
Umpires:
Jonathan Bredin (NZL)
Rachael Ayre (AUS)
Reserve umpire:
Michelle Phippard (AUS)
Kumwenda 40/18 (222%)
Simtowe 22/25 (88%)

Gallagher 13/16 (81%)
MacDonald 11/14 (79%)
Pettitt 6/10 (60%)
Sole 5/8 (63%)

30 July 2014
17:00

Report
Scotland
32 – 37
Northern Ireland

SECC Precinct
Umpires:
Rachael Ayre (AUS)
Joshua Bowring (AUS)
Reserve umpire:
Tracy Smith (ENG)
Gallagher 19/24 (79%)
MacDonald 13/16 (81%)
Pettitt 0/1 (0%)

Lennon 32/48 (67%)
McCullough 5/10 (50%)

== Rugby sevens ==
Pool A

Team	Pld	W	D	L	PF	PA	PD	Pts	Qualification
New Zealand	3	3	0	0	115	14	+101	9	Medal competition
Scotland	3	2	0	1	91	22	+69	7	Medal competition
Canada	3	1	0	2	73	65	+8	5	Bowl competition
Barbados	3	0	0	3	5	183	−178	3	Bowl competition

26 July 2014
13:56

New Zealand	17–14	Scotland
	Report

Ibrox Stadium, Glasgow

26 July 2014
18:02

Scotland	56–0	Barbados
	Report

Ibrox Stadium, Glasgow

26 July 2014
21:04

Canada	5–21	Scotland
	Report

Ibrox Stadium, Glasgow

Quarterfinal

27 July 2014
13:12

South Africa	35–12	Scotland
	Report

Ibrox Stadium, Glasgow

== Shooting ==
Men

Athlete	Event	Qualification		Semifinals		Final	
Athlete	Event	Points	Rank	Points	Rank	Points	Rank
Neil Stirton	50 metre rifle prone	618.3	8 Q	—N/a		78.6	8
Jonathan Hammond	50 metre rifle prone	615.9	11	—N/a		Did not advance	
Neil Stirton	50 metre rifle three positions	1143	6 Q	—N/a		423.3	4
Jonathan Hammond	50 metre rifle three positions	1141	7 Q	—N/a		413.2	5
David Owen	10 metre air pistol	563	13	—N/a		Did not advance	
Alan Ritchie	10 metre air pistol	562	15	—N/a		Did not advance	
Alan Goodall	50 metre pistol	526	16	—N/a		Did not advance	
Alan Ritchie	50 metre pistol	526	15	—N/a		Did not advance	
John MacDonald	Trap	104	19	Did not advance			
Jonathan Reid	Trap	107	13	Did not advance			
Drew Christie	Skeet	120	4 Q	13	2 QG	6	2nd place, silver medalist(s)

Women

Athlete	Event	Qualification		Semifinals		Final	
Athlete	Event	Points	Rank	Points	Rank	Points	Rank
Jennifer McIntosh	10 metre air rifle	412.1	6 Q	—N/a		100.7	7
Seonaid McIntosh	10 metre air rifle	404.1	19	—N/a		Did not advance	
Sarah Henderson	50 metre rifle prone	—N/a				615.2	7
Jennifer McIntosh	50 metre rifle prone	—N/a				619.5	3rd place, bronze medalist(s)
Sarah Henderson	50 metre rifle three positions	564	11	—N/a		Did not advance	
Jennifer McIntosh	50 metre rifle three positions	573	3 Q	—N/a		446.6	2nd place, silver medalist(s)
Caroline Brownlie	10 metre air pistol	350	24	—N/a		Did not advance	
Caroline Brownlie	25 metre pistol	513	23	Did not advance			
Shona Marshall	Trap	60	13	Did not advance			
Sian Bruce	Skeet	63	9	Did not advance			

Open

Athlete	Event	Day 1		Day 2		Day 3		Total	
Athlete	Event	Points	Rank	Points	Rank	Points	Rank	Points	Rank
Angus McLeod	Queen's prize individual	102–9v	15	150–21v	3	136–10v	8	388–40v	10
Ian Shaw	Queen's prize individual	102–13v	13	149–17v	12	137–11v	7	388–41v	9
Angus McLeod; Ian Shaw	Queen's prize pairs	298–36v	4	292–29v	3	—N/a		590–65v	3rd place, bronze medalist(s)

== Squash ==
Individual

Athlete	Event	Round of 64	Round of 32	Round of 16	Quarterfinals	Semifinals	Final	Rank
Athlete	Event	Opposition Score	Opposition Score	Opposition Score	Opposition Score	Opposition Score	Opposition Score	Rank
Alan Clyne	Men's singles	K Hannaway (SVG); W 3–0	H P Sandhu (IND); W 3–2	N Matthew (ENG); L 0–3	Did not advance			
Greg Lobban	Men's singles	B Burrowes (JAM); W 3–0	N Taylor (JER); W 3–0	C Pilley (AUS); L 0–3	Did not advance			
Kevin Moran	Men's singles	S Gautier (JER); W 3–0	M Knight (NZL); L 1–3	Did not advance				

Doubles

Athletes	Event	Group Stage				Round of 16	Quarterfinal	Semifinal	Third place	Rank
Athletes	Event	Opposition Score	Opposition Score	Opposition Score	Rank	Opposition Score	Opposition Score	Opposition Score	Opposition Score	Rank
Alan Clyne; Harry Leitch	Men's doubles	C Ramasra & K Wilson (TRI); W 2–0	S Fitzgerald & D Haley (WAL); W 2–0	—N/a	1 Q	M Lengwe & K Ndhlovu (ZAM); W 2–0	M Karwalski & R Cuskelly (AUS); W 2–0	A Grant & N Matthew (ENG); L 0–2	D Selby & J Willstrop (ENG); L 0–2	4
Greg Lobban; Stuart Crawford	Men's doubles	J Bentick & K Hannaway (SVG); W 2–0	V B J Bong & I Yuen (MAS); W 2–1	S M J Suari & K Walsh (PNG); W 2–0	1 Q	S Ghosal & H P Sandhu (IND); W 2–1	D Palmer & C Pilley (AUS); L 0–2	Did not advance		
Alex Clark; Frania Gillen-Buchert	Women's doubles	A Waters & E Beddoes (ENG); L 0–2	S Morove & D Boyce (PNG); W 2–0	J King & A Landers-Murphy (NZL); L 0–2	3	—N/a	Did not advance			
Frania Gillen-Buchert; Alan Clyne	Mixed doubles	S M J Suari & L Vai (PNG); W 2–0	M N Mohd Adnan & D Arnold (MAS); W 2–0	D Murphy & E Bridgeman (CAY); W 2–0	1 Q	P Coll & A Landers-Murphy (NZL); L 1–2	Did not advance			
Alex Clark; Kevin Moran	Mixed doubles	M Knight & J King (NZL); L 0–2	N Taylor & S Taylor (JER); W WO	—N/a	2 Q	C Pilley & K Brown (AUS); L 0–2	Did not advance			

== Swimming ==
Men

Athlete	Event	Heat		Semifinal		Final	
Athlete	Event	Time	Rank	Time	Rank	Time	Rank
Richard Schaffers	50 m freestyle	22.54	=6 Q	22.59	10	Did not advance	
Robert Renwick	200 m freestyle	1:47.15	4 Q	—N/a		1:46.79	5
Craig Rodgie	200 m freestyle S14	2:06.02	6 Q	—N/a		2:03.20	5
Stephen Milne	400 m freestyle	3:46.88	3 Q	—N/a		3:49.90	8
Robert Renwick	400 m freestyle	3:47.19	5 Q	—N/a		3:48.81	7
Daniel Wallace	400 m freestyle	3:46.96	4 Q	—N/a		3:46.11	5
Martin Cremin	1500 m freestyle	15:27.30	11	—N/a		Did not advance	
Craig Hamilton	1500 m freestyle	15:35.60	14	—N/a		Did not advance	
Stephen Milne	1500 m freestyle	15:03.38	2 Q	—N/a		15:04.90	5
Rory Lamont	50 m backstroke	26.56	14 Q	26.69	13	Did not advance	
Andrew McGovern	50 m backstroke	25.98	9 Q	26.19	11	Did not advance	
Jack Ness	50 m backstroke	26.47	12 Q	26.17	10	Did not advance	
Ryan Bennett	100 m backstroke	55.35	10 Q	54.87	9	Did not advance	
Craig McNally	100 m backstroke	55.28	9 Q	54.40	6 Q	54.54	7
Ryan Bennett	200 m backstroke	1:59.44	5 Q	—N/a		1:58.45	6
Craig McNally	200 m backstroke	2:00.00	7 Q	—N/a		1:58.27	5
Ross Murdoch	50 m breaststroke	27.44	3 Q	27.41	5 Q	27.65	6
Mark Tully	50 m breaststroke	27.77	6 Q	27.37	4 Q	27.47	4
Joe Welstead	50 m breaststroke	27.90	7 Q	27.73	7 Q	27.99	7
Craig Benson	100 m breaststroke	1:01.30	6 Q	1:00.40	5 Q	1:00.44	4
Michael Jamieson	100 m breaststroke	1:01.98	10 Q	1:02.04	11	Did not advance	
Ross Murdoch	100 m breaststroke	1:00.63	2 Q	59.72	2 Q	59.47	3rd place, bronze medalist(s)
Michael Jamieson	200 m breaststroke	2:10.17	2 Q	—N/a		2:08.40	2nd place, silver medalist(s)
Ross Murdoch	200 m breaststroke	2:08.78 GR	1 Q	—N/a		2:07.30 GR	1st place, gold medalist(s)
Calum Tait	200 m breaststroke	2:10.33	3 Q	—N/a		2:10.21	5
Cameron Brodie	200 m butterfly	1:57.28	1 Q	—N/a		1:56.59	4
Lewis Smith	200 m butterfly	1:59.25	11	—N/a		Did not advance	
Daniel Wallace	200 m individual medley	1:59.36	2 Q	—N/a		1:58.72	2nd place, silver medalist(s)
Ross Muir	400 m individual medley	4:19.22	8 Q	—N/a		4:21.50	8
Lewis Smith	400 m individual medley	4:15.64	5 Q	—N/a		4:16.17	5
Daniel Wallace	400 m individual medley	4:11.04 GR	1 Q	—N/a		4:11.20	1st place, gold medalist(s)
Kieran McGuckin; Robert Renwick; Richard Schafers; Duncan Scott; Jak Scott*; Jack Thorpe*	4 × 100 m freestyle relay	3:19.60	3 Q	—N/a		3:17.66	4
Cameron Brodie*; Craig Hamilton*; Gareth Mills*; Stephen Milne; Robert Renwick; Duncan Scott; Jak Scott*; Daniel Wallace	4 × 200 m freestyle relay	7:18.93	3 Q	—N/a		7:09.18	2nd place, silver medalist(s)
Ryan Bennett; Craig Benson*; Cameron Brodie; Andrew McGovern*; Ross Murdoch; Robert Renwick; Jack Thorpe*	4 × 100 m medley relay	3:42.01	7 Q	—N/a		3:37.48	7

Women

Athlete	Event	Heat		Semifinal		Final	
Athlete	Event	Time	Rank	Time	Rank	Time	Rank
Sian Harkin	50 m freestyle	25.30	7 Q	25.29	8 Q	25.31	7
Caitlin McClatchey	200 m freestyle	1:59.04	9	—N/a		Did not advance	
Caitlin McClatchey	400 m freestyle	4:15.36	12	—N/a		Did not advance	
Hannah Miley	400 m freestyle	4:09.30	5 Q	—N/a		4:06.21	4
Camilla Hattersley	800 m freestyle	8:36.15	6 Q	—N/a		8:33.83	7
Hannah Miley	800 m freestyle	8:36.16	7 Q	—N/a		8:28.15	5
Aisha Thornton	800 m freestyle	8:41.02	=10^{[a]}	—N/a		Did not advance	
Kathleen Dawson	50 m backstroke	28.56	4 Q	28.55	6 Q	28.47	5
Kathleen Dawson	100 m backstroke	1:00.91	8 Q	1:01.17	10	Did not advance	
Kathryn Johnstone	50 m breaststroke	31.38	8 Q	31.12	6 Q	31.47	6
Corrie Scott	50 m breaststroke	30.64	3 Q	30.79	4 Q	30.75	3rd place, bronze medalist(s)
Andrea Strachan	50 m breaststroke	31.90	11 Q	31.52	8 Q	31.99	8
Katie Armitage	100 m breaststroke	1:08.81	4 Q	1:08.69	7 Q	1:09.56	8
Kathryn Johnstone	100 m breaststroke	1:10.44	14 Q	1:09.42	14	Did not advance	
Corrie Scott	100 m breaststroke	1:09.56	9 Q	1:08.94	9	Did not advance	
Erraid Davies	100 m breaststroke SB9	1:22.08	2 Q	—N/a		1:21.68	3rd place, bronze medalist(s)
Hannah Miley	200 m breaststroke	2:28.22	7 Q	—N/a		2:25.40	=4
Sian Harkin	50 m butterfly	27.03	13 Q	27.52	15	Did not advance	
Hannah Miley	200 m butterfly	2:11.06	7 Q	—N/a		2:09.32	6
Hannah Miley	200 m individual medley	2:12.45	3 Q	—N/a		2:10.74	3rd place, bronze medalist(s)
Hannah Miley	400 m individual medley	4:38.27 GR	1 Q	—N/a		4:31.76 GR	1st place, gold medalist(s)
Sian Harkin; Lucy Hope; Rachel Masson; Caitlin McClatchey; Rachael O'Donnell*	4 × 100 m freestyle relay	3:45.79	5 Q	—N/a		3:44.56	5
Megan Gilchrist; Lucy Hope*; Rachel Masson; Caitlin McClatchey; Hannah Miley; Rachael O'Donnell*	4 × 200 m freestyle relay	8:11.26	5 Q	—N/a		7:59.06	5
Katie Armitage; Fiona Donnelly; Kathleen Dawson; Sian Harkin; Lucy Hope*; Rachel Masson*; Corrie Scott*	4 × 100 m medley relay	4:09.17	4 Q	—N/a		4:05.59	4

^{a} Aisha Thornton finished in equal tenth position in the heats alongside New Zealand's Emma Robinson. Robinson defeated Thornton by less than a second in a swim-off between the two competitors to determine the second reserve for the final.

Qualifiers for the latter rounds (Q) of all events were decided on a time only basis, therefore positions shown are overall results versus competitors in all heats.
* – Indicates athlete swam in the preliminaries but not in the final race.

== Table tennis ==
Singles

Athlete	Event	Group Stage			Round of 128	Round of 64	Round of 32	Round of 16	Quarterfinals	Semifinals	Final	Rank
Athlete	Event	Opposition Result	Opposition Result	Rank	Opposition Result	Opposition Result	Opposition Result	Opposition Result	Opposition Result	Opposition Result	Opposition Result	Rank
Sean Doherty	Men's singles	A A Tumaini (TAN); W 4–0	K Gaymes Jr (SVG); W 4–0	1 Q	P McCreery (NIR); L 0–4	Did not advance						
Craig Howieson	Men's singles	R Dorovolomo (SOL); W 4–0	A Freeman (SKN); W 4–0	1 Q	D Deshappriya (SRI); W 4–0	R Jenkins (WAL); L 0–4	Did not advance					
Gavin Rumgay	Men's singles	Bye				A Ho (CAN); W 4–1	W Henzell (AUS); L 1–4	Did not advance				
Gillian Edwards	Women's singles	A Loveridge (GUE); L 2–4	P Matariki (VAN); W 4–0	2	Did not advance							
Lynda Flaws	Women's singles	A Freeman (SKN); W 4–0	Y Foster (JAM); W 4–3	1 Q	C Akpan (NGR); L 0–4	Did not advance						
Corinna Whitaker	Women's singles	N Mokeki (LES); W 4–0	D Morgan (GUE); L 0–4	2	Did not advance							

Doubles

Athlete	Event	Round of 128	Round of 64	Round of 32	Round of 16	Quarterfinals	Semifinals	Final	Rank
Athlete	Event	Opposition Result	Opposition Result	Opposition Result	Opposition Result	Opposition Result	Opposition Result	Opposition Result	Rank
Niall Cameron; Sean Doherty	Men's doubles	T Liu & P Xiao (NZL); W 3–1	J Band & C Gascoyne (JER); W 3–0	D Reed & S Walker (ENG); L 0–3	Did not advance				
Craig Howieson; Gavin Rumgay	Men's doubles	Bye	D Deshappriya & R Sirisena (SRI); W 3–2	Q Aruna & S Toriola (NGR); L 0–3	Did not advance				
Lynda Flaws; Corinna Whitaker	Women's doubles	G Lohia & E Tongia (PNG); W 3–0	T Feng & M Yu (SIN); L 0–3	Did not advance					
Sean Doherty; Corinna Whitaker	Mixed doubles	Bye	R Sirisena & I Madurangi (SRI); L 0–3	Did not advance					
Niall Cameron; Gillian Edwards	Mixed doubles	Bye	H Frank & G Lohia (PNG); W 3–0	D Reed & K Sibley (ENG); L 0–3	Did not advance				

Team

Athlete	Event	Group Stage				Round of 16	Quarterfinals	Semifinals	Final	Rank
Athlete	Event	Opposition Result	Opposition Result	Opposition Result	Rank	Opposition Result	Opposition Result	Opposition Result	Opposition Result	Rank
Niall Cameron; Sean Doherty; Craig Howieson; Gavin Rumgay	Men's Team	Uganda; W 3–0	Canada; W 3–1	Tanzania; W 3–0	1 Q	Sri Lanka; W 3–0	India; L 0–3	Did not advance		
Gillian Edwards; Lynda Flaws; Corinna Whitaker	Women's Team	Australia; L 0–3	Guyana; L 2–3	—N/a	3	Did not advance				

== Triathlon ==
Athlete	Event	Swim (1.5 km)	Trans 1	Bike (40 km)	Trans 2	Run (10 km)	Total Time	Rank
Mark Austin	Men's	18:01	00:34	59:57	00:23	38:58	1:57:53	22
David McNamee	Men's	18:46	00:34	59:08	00:23	32:08	1:50:59	7
Grant Sheldon	Men's	18:35	00:37	59:13	00:26	34:21	1:53:10	14

Mixed Relay

Athletes	Event	Swim (400 m)	Trans 1	Bike (10 km)	Trans 2	Run (2.5 km)	Total Time	Team Time	Rank
Natalie Milne	Mixed relay	3:27	0:27	9:27	0:25	5:38	19:24	1:17:50	7
Grant Sheldon	Mixed relay	3:25	0:26	9:06	0:28	5:02	18:27	1:17:50	7
Seonaid Thompson	Mixed relay	3:56	0:25	10:31	0:26	5:53	21:11	1:17:50	7
David McNamee	Mixed relay	3:35	0:26	9:18	0:26	5:03	18:48	1:17:50	7

== Weightlifting ==
Men

Athlete	Event	Snatch		Clean & Jerk		Total	Rank
Athlete	Event	Result	Rank	Result	Rank	Total	Rank
Peter Kirkbride	−94 kg	142	9	—	—	—	—

Women

Athlete	Event	Snatch		Clean & Jerk		Total	Rank
Athlete	Event	Result	Rank	Result	Rank	Total	Rank
Sophie Smyth	−58 kg	60	15	85	13	145	14
Georgina Black	−63 kg	75	11	100	8	175	9
Louise Mather	−69 kg	75	11	96	10	171	11

Powerlifting

Athlete	Event	Result	Rank
Michael Yule	Men's +72 kg	172.9	4

== Wrestling ==
Key:

- VT – Victory by Fall.
- PP – Decision by Points – the loser with technical points.
- PO – Decision by Points – the loser without technical points.

Men's freestyle

Athlete	Event	Round of 16	Quarterfinal	Semifinal	Repechage	Final / BM	Rank
Athlete	Event	Opposition Result	Opposition Result	Opposition Result	Opposition Result	Opposition Result	Rank
Brian Harper	−57 kg	S Parker (AUS); L 0−4	Did not advance				
Ross McFarlane	−57 kg	Bye	C Pilling (WAL); L 0−3	Did not advance			
Viorel Etko	−61 kg	M Asselstine (CAN); W 3−1	G Ramm (ENG); W 4−1	D Tremblay (CAN); L 1−3	—N/a	A Vella (MLT); W 4−0	3rd place, bronze medalist(s)
Alex Gladkov	−65 kg	T Dutt (IND); L 0−4	Did not advance		G Jones (SCO); W 4−0	C Perera (SRI); W 3−1	3rd place, bronze medalist(s)
Gareth Jones	−65 kg	T Kitiona (KIR); W 4−0	T Dutt (IND); L 0−4	Did not advance	A Gladkov (SCO); L 0−4	Did not advance	
Luigi Bianco	−86 kg	Elie Zamdam (CMR); W 5−0	P Kumar (IND); L 0−5	Did not advance			
Lewis Waddell	−86 kg	Bye	A Hietbrink (RSA); L 0−4	Did not advance			

Women's freestyle

Athlete	Event	Quarterfinal	Semifinal	Repechage	Final / BM	Rank
Athlete	Event	Opposition Result	Opposition Result	Opposition Result	Opposition Result	Rank
Donna Robertson	−48 kg	R Muambo (CMR); L 0−4	Did not advance			
Fiona Robertson	−48 kg	Y Rattigan (ENG); L 0−4	Did not advance	—N/a	R Muambo (CMR); L 0−4	=5
Jayne Clason	−53 kg	S Hawke (SCO); L 0−5	Did not advance			
Shannon Hawke	−53 kg	J Clason (SCO); W 5−0	L Lalita (IND); L 0−5	—N/a	M Madi (RSA); L 0−5	=5
Kathryn Marsh	−55 kg	B Kumari (IND); L 1−4	Did not advance	—N/a	L Porogovska (ENG); L 1−3	=5
Chelsea Murphy	−55 kg	L Porogovska (ENG); L 0−3	Did not advance			
Sarah Jones	−69 kg	D Yeats (CAN); L 0−5	Did not advance	—N/a	N Navjot Kaur (IND); L 0−4	=5
