= Shooting at the 2014 Commonwealth Games – Queen's Prize pairs =

Shooting – Queen's Prize pairs at the 2014 Commonwealth Games
- Venue: Barry Buddon Shooting Centre
- Dates: 25–26 July 2014
- Competitors: 34 from 17 nations

Medalists
gold medal	David Luckman; Parag Patel	England
silver medal	James Paton; Desmond Vamplew	Canada
bronze medal	Angus McLeod; Ian Shaw	Scotland

The Queen's Prize pairs event took place on 25 and 26 July 2014 at the Barry Buddon Shooting Centre. The winners were determined by the number of points each team had at the end of the second day.

== Results ==
Rank	Country	Names	Day 1			Subtotal Day 1	Day 2		Subtotal Day 2	Total
Rank	Country	Names	300	500	600	Subtotal Day 1	900	1000	Subtotal Day 2	Total
1st place, gold medalist(s)	England	David Luckman; Parag Patel	100-13v	100-16v	100-14v	300-43v	150-20v	145-14v	295-34v	595-77v
2nd place, silver medalist(s)	Canada	James Paton; Desmond Vamplew	100-12v	99-9v	99-9v	298-30v	149-16v	145-8v	294-24v	592-54v
3rd place, bronze medalist(s)	Scotland	Angus McLeod; Ian Shaw	99-13v	100-9v	99-14v	298-36v	148-17v	144-12v	292-29v	590-65v
4	Australia	James Corbett; Geoff Grenfell	100-14v	100-12v	100-16v	300-42v	149-18v	137-6v	286-24v	586-66v
5	Jersey	Barry le Cheminant; Dan Richardson	100-13v	99-13v	99-11v	298-37v	143-10v	144-10v	287-20v	585-57v
6	Guyana	Mahendra Persaud; Lennox Braithwaite	99-10v	99-9v	98-7v	296-26v	147-11v	142-10v	289-21v	585-47v
7	Wales	Gareth Morris; Chris Watson	99-8v	99-9v	100-16v	298-33v	146-14v	140-13v	286-27v	584-60v
8	New Zealand	Mike Collings; John Snowden	99-11v	97-8v	99-8v	295-27v	148-11v	140-6v	288-17v	583-44v
9	Northern Ireland	David Calvert; Jack Alexander	99-12v	100-13v	99-7v	298-32v	145-13v	138-6v	283-19v	581-51v
10	South Africa	Johannes du Toit; Frederik Coetzee	100-10v	98-11v	98-11v	296-32v	146-16v	132-5v	278-21v	574-53v
11	Guernsey	Peter Jory; Nick Mace	99-11v	97-15v	97-6v	293-32v	145-10v	136-6v	281-16v	574-48v
12	Malaysia	Shahrizal Ishak; Rozli Mohamad	97-11v	99-10v	97-8v	293-29v	144-14v	129-7v	273-21v	566-50v
13	Kenya	Christopher K Saina; Satiender S Sehmi	96-6v	98-13v	97-5v	291-24v	137-9v	133-3v	270-12v	561-36v
14	Jamaica	David C Rickman; Denis Nelson	96-5v	97-8v	98-9v	291-22v	134-10v	125-2v	259-12v	550-34v
15	Trinidad and Tobago	Norris Gomez; Michael Perez	92-7v	92-7v	97-10v	286-24v	131-4v	123-4v	254-8v	540-32v
16	Falkland Islands	Gareth Goodwin; Derek Goodwin	93-5v	96-6v	92-4v	281-15v	130-5v	125-5v	255-10v	536-25v
17	Antigua and Barbuda	Thomas Greenaway; Anderson Perry	93-3v	93-2v	82-4v	268-9v	129-9v	60-0v	189-9v	457-18v
