= Parag Patel =

British sport shooter (born 1975)

Personal information
- Nationality: British
- Born: 27 December 1975 (age 50) Kingston upon Thames, England
- Height: 5 ft 10 in (178 cm)
- Weight: 71 kg (157 lb)

Sport
- Country: England; Great Britain
- Sport: Sport shooter
- Event: Fullbore target rifle
Medal record
Representing England
Men's shooting
Commonwealth Games
Gold medal – first place	2006 Melbourne	Fullbore pairs
Gold medal – first place	2010 Delhi	Fullbore individual
Gold medal – first place	2014 Glasgow	Queen's Prize pairs
Gold medal – first place	2018 Gold Coast	Queen's Prize pairs
Silver medal – second place	2006 Melbourne	Fullbore individual
Bronze medal – third place	2010 Delhi	Fullbore pairs
Bronze medal – third place	2014 Glasgow	Queen's Prize individual
Bronze medal – third place	2018 Gold Coast	Queen's Prize individual
Commonwealth Championships
Gold medal – first place	2017 Brisbane	Fullbore pairs
- Updated on 18 April 2018

Parag Patel FRCS (born 27 December 1975) is a British sport shooter who works as an ear, nose and throat consultant at Kingston Hospital in London.

Patel competed for England in the Queen's prize pairs and individual events at the 2014 Commonwealth Games where he won a gold and bronze medal respectively. He had previously won two golds, a silver and a bronze in the full bore rifle events at the two preceding Commonwealth Games.

On 22 July 2017, Patel won the prestigious Gold Medal in the third stage of the Queen's Prize competition during the National Rifle Association's 148th Imperial Meeting, held at Bisley Camp in Surrey, England. Patel managed a rare double, also winning the Silver Medal for highest score in the short-range second stage.

In 2018 he won the Pairs event at the 2018 Commonwealth Games with partner David Luckman. He won a bronze medal in the individual match.

In 2026 he won the Sovereign's Prize for the second time.

Patel started shooting at Epsom College and his prodigious talent was in early evidence as he won the Canadian Grand Aggregate as an Atheling in 1994.
