= Sovereign's Prize =

Annual prize for target rifle shooting in Britain

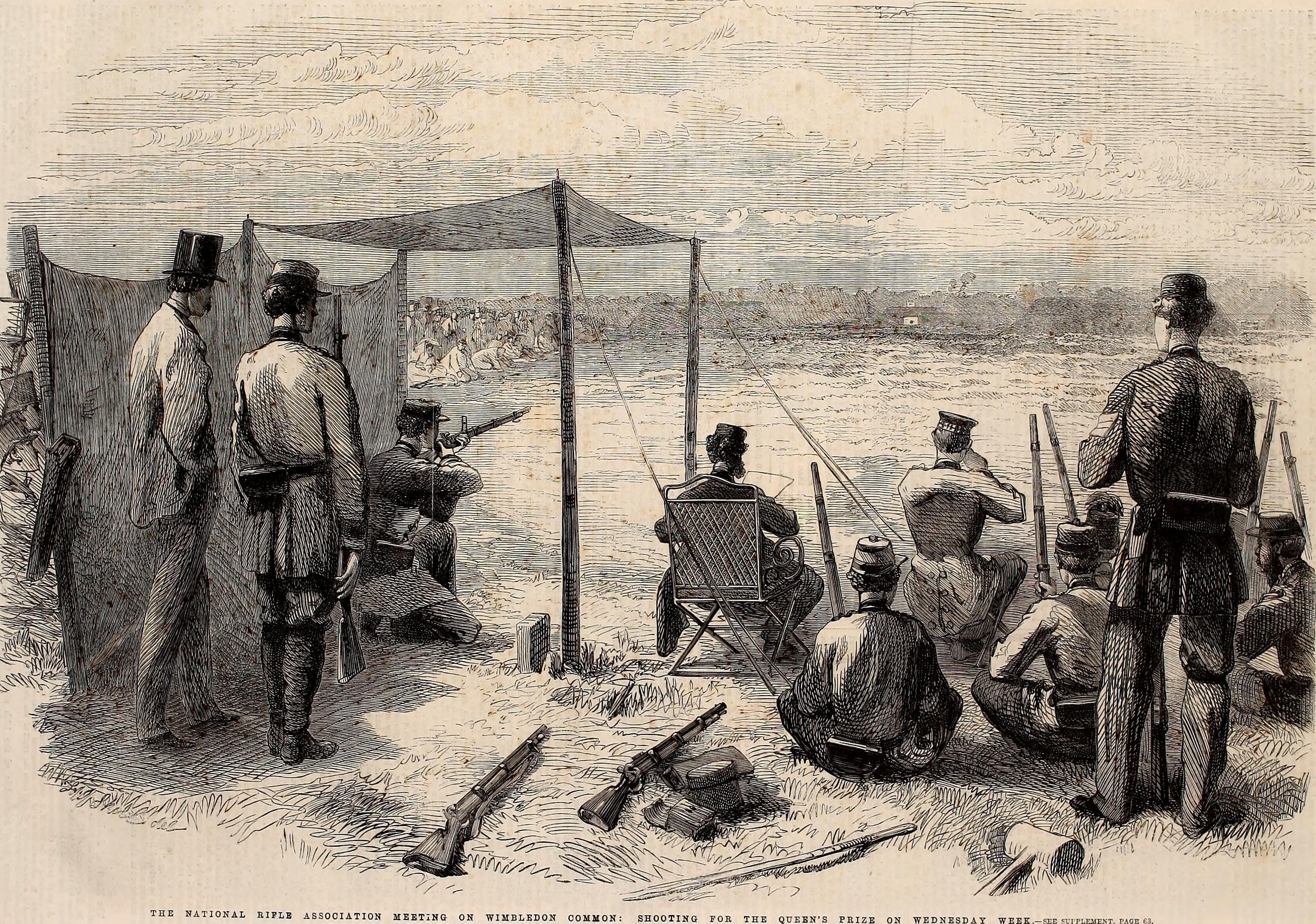
- An illustration of the 1861 competition
- Sport: Shooting
- Competition: Imperial Meeting
- Discipline: Fullbore target rifle
- Location: Bisley Camp
- Country: United Kingdom
- Presented by: National Rifle Association

History
- First award: 1860
- Editions: 157
- First winner: Edward CR Ross
- Most wins: A Fulton; A Marion; TA Ringer; D Calvert; GCD Barnett; DC Luckman; 3 times
- Most recent: PM Patel

The Sovereign's Prize, referred to as the Queen's Prize or the King's Prize depending on the incumbent British monarch, is widely regarded as one of the most prestigious prizes in target rifle shooting, globally. Founded in 1860, it was originally held annually on Wimbledon Common in London. The competition later moved to the purpose-built Bisley Camp where it is still held today.

The winner receives a gold medal and £250. Strictly, the "Sovereign's Prize" refers to the £250 cash prize, which was originally the personal gift of Queen Victoria. The gold medal is awarded by the Association. As of 2026, the Prize has been contested 157 times, breaking only for the World Wars. Although contested on an open basis, it has only been won three times by women (in 1930, 2000 and 2022). Six people have won it three times.

== Course of fire ==
As of 2022, the Prize is contested in three stages. Standard NRA targets are used, with scoring rings offering a maximum score of five points, plus a "v-bull" within the 5-ring (used for tie-breaking). Since the move to the National Shooting Centre at Bisley, the first and second stages have been contested on the 600-yard range Century Range, whilst the final is contested on Stickledown Range (which can support shooting up to 1200 yards).

The format used by stages II and III is sometimes known as a "King's Prize" match. A "King's Prize" is used as the standard course of fire for fullbore rifle matches at the Commonwealth Games, although all competitors shoot all distances without elimination.

=== King's I ===
Stage one is an open elimination round consisting of three "2+7" matches (2 sighters with 7 shots to count) at 300, 500 and 600 yards. This gives a highest possible score of 105 with 21 V-bulls (rendered as 105.21v).

The top three hundred competitors progress to the second stage, which typically includes scores of ~101 or better.

=== King's II ===
Stage two consists of 2+10 matches at the same distances as the first stage. Qualification is on a "start from zero" basis, meaning that scores from the first stage are not carried forward and top qualifiers have no advantage over those with poorer scores in the first stage. The highest possible score is 150 with 30 v-bulls (150.30v).

The top one hundred competitors progress to the third and final stage. The "King's Hundred" each receive an NRA '100' Badge. The top scorer in the second stage is awarded an NRA Silver Medal for winning the "short range" portion of the competition, regardless of how they perform in the final.

=== King's III (King's Final) ===
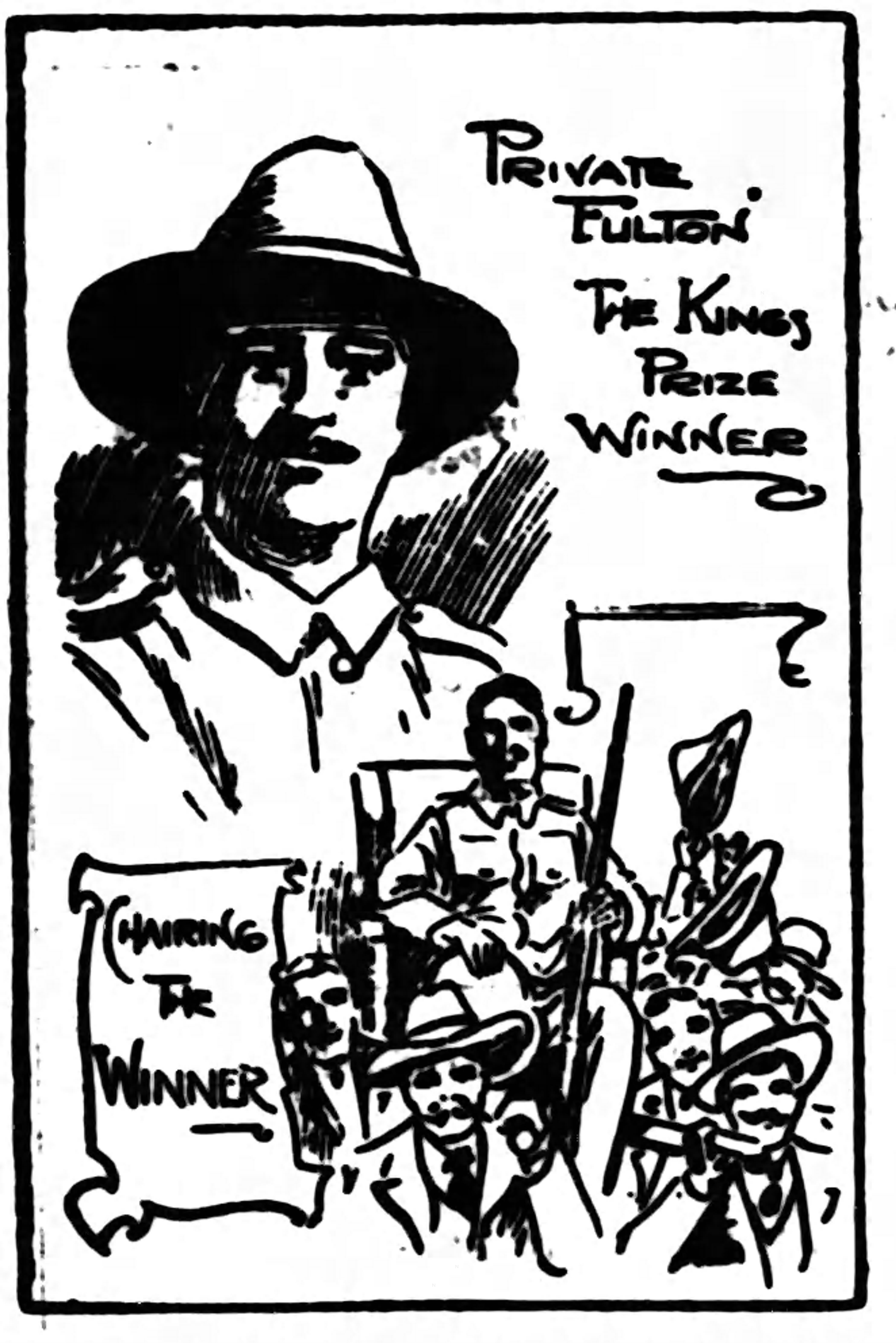
Newspaper illustration of Arthur Fulton being chaired after winning the 1912 Kings Prize.

Stage three moves to longer distances, consisting of 2+15 shoots at 900 and 1000 yards. Scores are carried forward from the second stage, giving a highest possible score of 300.60v. Winning scores better than 298 are common, indicating the shooter has only dropped one or two shots across five distances and sixty shots.

The winner receives a gold medal and £250, with the runners up receiving silver and bronze badges respectively. The winner is then "chaired" off the range on an open sedan chair borne by other competitors. By tradition they are carried to the NRA offices to receive their prize, followed by a tour of the clubhouses on camp.

== Winners ==
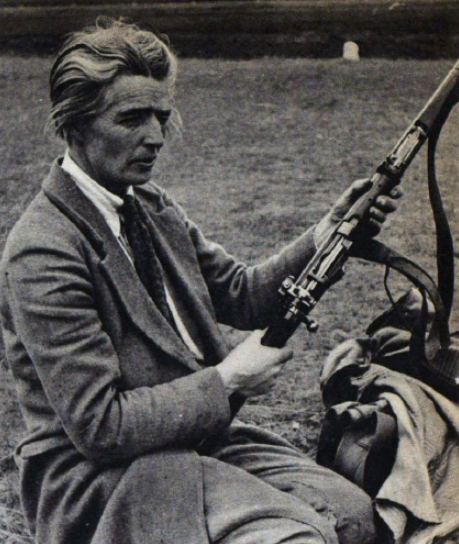
Marjorie Foster

Notable winners include the three female winners – Marjorie Foster (1930); Joanna Hossack (2000) and Alice Good (2022). A road on Bisley Camp is named Marjorie Foster Way.

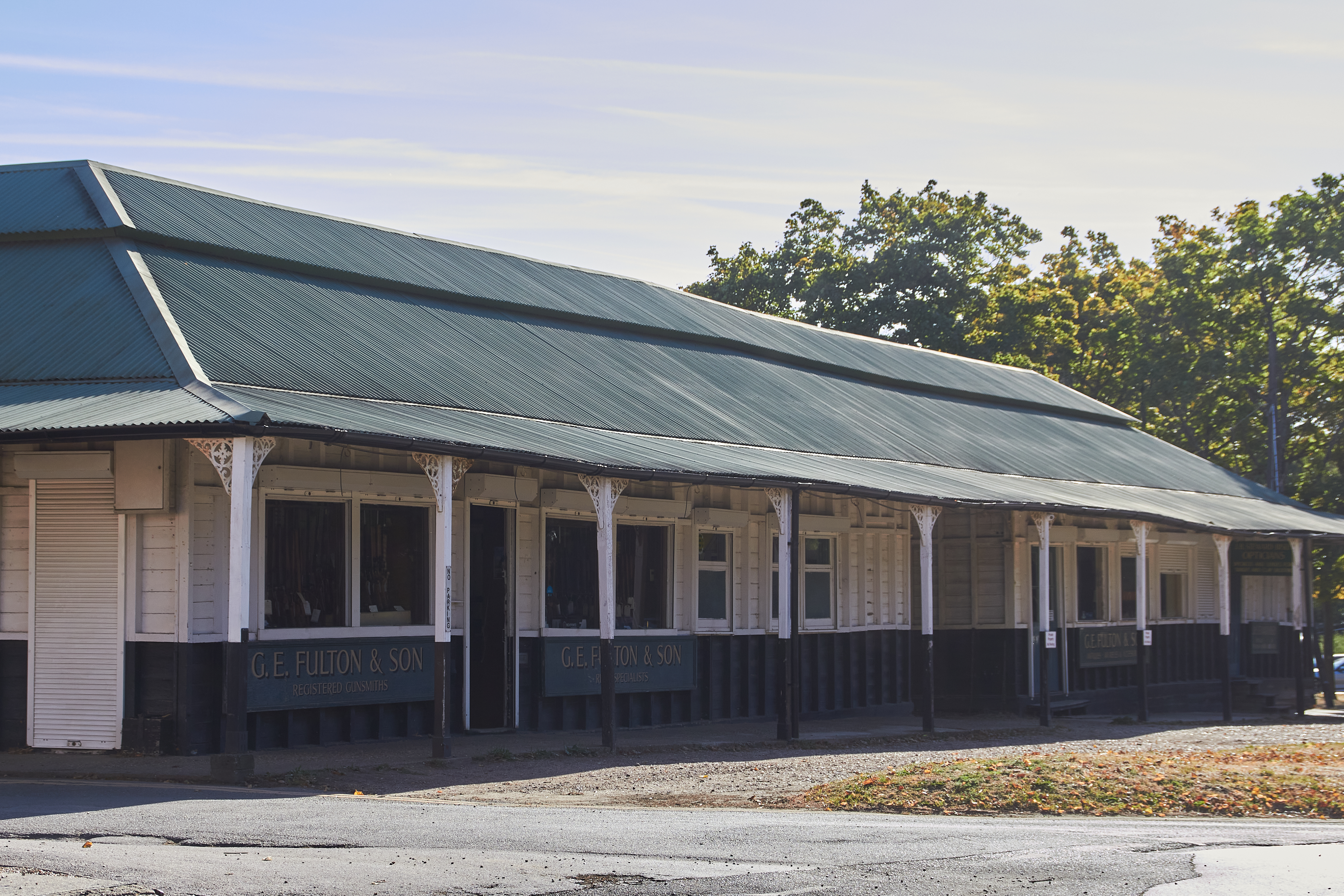
Fulton's Gun Shop, National Shooting Centre

The Fulton family have the unique distinction of having three generations of winners. George Fulton used the proceeds of his 1888 win to found Fulton's Gun Shop on Bisley Camp, which still stands today. His son Arthur won a record-breaking three times in 1912, 1926 and 1931. Arthur's son Robin won in 1958.

Arthur Fulton's record was only matched in 1996. There are now six shooters who have won the Prize three times:

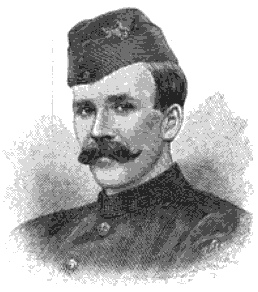
W. T. Ward, winner in 1897 and 1900

- Arthur Fulton (1912, 1926, 1931)
- Alain Marion (1980, 1983, 1996)
- TA Ringer (1992, 1997, 2001)
- David Calvert (2010, 2015, 2016)
- GCD Barnett (2002, 2003, 2019)
- DC Luckman (2018, 2020, 2024)

Also notable is PA Bennison's 1998 shoot, where he became the first person to score a "possible" with 300.40v. Canadian shooter James Paton matched this in 2005 with another 300.40v.

Year	Gold Medal	Gold Medal Score	Silver Medal (Note: The Silver Medal is awarded to the highest scorer in the second stage, who has effectively won the "short range" portion of the competition. The overall runner-up in the Final is awarded a silver badge, and is not recorded here.)	Silver Medal Score
1860	ECR Ross	24	Cpl F Sharp	17
1861	Pte JM Jopling	18	Sgt J Dougan	23
1862	S Pixley	41	Ens H Walton	46
1863	J Roberts	65	Cpl W Wisker	49
1864	J Wyatt	60	Pte J Haward	47
1865	J Sharman	64	ECR Ross	47
1866	A Cameron	69	Pte A James	48
1867	H Lane	57	Capt W Wright	52
1868	JB Carslake	65	D/Maj SG Hutchinson	51
1869	A Cameron	71	T Kirk	46
1870	W Humphries	66	Cpl H Young	49
1871	AP Humphry	68	Pte TH Mayfield	51
1872	W Michie	65	Capt A Cortis	52
1873	AD Menzies	60	Cpl R Willows	74
1874	WC Atkinson	64	Cpl H Young	87
1875	G Pearse	73	Pte A Innes	90
1876	R Pullman	74	Pte RB Burgess	86
1877	G Jamieson	70	Cpl Betts	92
1878	P Rae	78	Pte C Lowe	47
1879	G Taylor	83	QM JC Macdonald	96
1880	A Ferguson	74	Cpl Scott	102
1881	T Beck	86	Cpl W Ingram	96
1882	A Lawrance	65	Sgt WHO Smith	174
1883	Col-Sgt R Mackay	79	Capt JH Young	183
1884	D Gallant	110	Sgt JH Taylor	105
1885	W Bulmer	307	Col-Sgt Simonds	104
1886	CH Jackson	265	Capt A Cortis	110
1887	RO Warren	274	Armr-Sgt Hill	104
1888	Armr-Sgt GE Fulton	280	LCpl Noakes	108
1889	Sgt D Reid	281	Pte CW Wattleworth	205
1890	H Bates	278	Pte J Murray	107
1891	D Dear	269	Sgt A Milner	113
1892	Major J Pollock	277	Major J Pollock	108
1893	Sgt WT Davies	274	Pte A Stocks	96
1894	Pte MS Rennie	283	Capt H Bateman	113
1895	TH Hayhurst	279	LSgt W Hogg	114
1896	JL Thomson	273	Capt R Foster	105
1897	WT Ward	304	Armr-Sgt JH Scott	117
1898	D Yates	327	Lieut EL Fletcher	119
1899	WA Priaulx	336	Col-Sgt HWM Matthews	120
1900	WT Ward	341	Col-Sgt H Comery	116
1901	Cpl ANVH Ommundsen	310	Armr-Sgt AJ Comber	93
1902	Lt ED Johnson	307	Cpl TH Kerr	94
1903	Col-Sgt WT Davies	311	Pte W Gray	85
1904	SJ Perry	321	Chap CJ Ferguson-Davie	93
1905	AJ Comber	315	SSgt G Souter	119
1906	RfF Davies	324	Sgt ANVH Ommundsen	94
1907	WC Addison	318	Pte EA Buckley	99
1908	G Gray	325	Gnr DR Paterson	94
1909	HG Burr	324	Lieut JW Beatty	93
1910	FR Radice	340	FR Radice	94
1911	WJ Clifford	319	Pte AG Garrod	95
1912	AG Fulton	335	RSIM GH Harvey	96
1913	WA Hawkins	330	Sgt ANVH Ommundsen	92
1914	JL Dewar	309	AG Fulton	94
1919	Sgt L Loveday	253	Pte RW Lockwood	129
1920	FH Morgan	281	Capt WH Hoey	144
1921	J Cunningham	226	CR Crowe	95
1922	AF Marchment	230	RSM S Green	94
1923	EH Robinson	232	J Elgood	97
1924	DT Burke	230	CSM JL Dewar	95
1925	A Smith	226	Fl Off G Richardson	98
1926	AG Fulton	286	FH Kelly	146
1927	Capt, Dr CH Vernon	292	AG Fulton	148
1928	AC Hale	283	Lieut AE Martin	145
1929	RM Blair	283	Pte PRT Garnett	141
1930	Marjorie Foster	280	Lieut AJ Andrews	147
1931	AG Fulton	285	AG Fulton	145
1932	CFH Bayly	289	JW Houlden	146
1933	DE Woods	287	Fl Off C Bunch	145
1934	JA Barlow	288	CSM WR Clarke	146
1935	Armr-Sgt FS French	289	CA Sutherland	148
1936	LD Busschau	272	Sgt JE Johnson	146
1937	DL Birney	283	O/Cdt DL Birney	143
1938	JA Barlow	287	RD Greig	147
1939	Capt TS Smith	282	Lieut A Eccles	146
1946	CC Willott	280	Capt RJ Middlemas	144
1947	WO R Bennett	279	WO R Bennett	146
1948	PA Pavey	283	Cpl RJ Kerslake	146
1949	Capt EWH Brookes	278	AG Fox	146
1950	Capt RD Greig	277	J Draper	144
1951	Lt GS Boa	285	Flt Lt H Gill	144
1952	Major AB Kinnier-Wilson	277	WH Magnay	146
1953	Major NW McCaw	273	RL Saunders	145
1954	Major GE Twine	278	Major GE Twine	145
1955	LR Fenwick	286	Lt Col OA Watts	146
1956	Major GE Twine	283	Capt AF Bromley	142
1957	JRC Love	283	Lt Col F Adams	147
1958	Major RA Fulton	281	Lord Swansea	145
1959	Lt LW Mallabar	276	M Hook (later Hook-Sinclair)	146
1960	Sgt G Westling	280	Lt Col DE Elford	146
1961	WO2 NL Beckett	284	NL Beckett	148
1962	Flt Lt PWM Hall	280	PO RS Boyman	147
1963	KM Pilcher	283	Dr KM Pilcher	148
1964	AD Harris	281	LEM PEM Tarrant	147
1965	Capt JA Allen	284	Lt Col HJ Orpen-Smellie	147
1966	Maj RW Hampton	280	Lieut RJ Cade	146
1967	JG Powell	280	Major GE Twine	147
1968	Capt AA Parks	285	Lord Swansea	146
1969	FG Little	284	CERA D Fox	145
1970	GF Arnold	281	EGJ Hayes	146
1971	RM Stevens	292	MJ Brister	150
1972	RP Rosling	293.34	TPB Garnett	148.19
1973	KM Pilcher	293.39	KO Pugh	149.23
1974	FO Harriss	283	JR Killian	148
1975	CMY Trotter	284	GF Arnold	148
1976	WH Magnay	287	E Felton	149
1977	DA Friend	283	JMA Thompson	149
1978	GR Graham	285	PG Kent	148
1979	Andrew Tucker	290	JH Carmichael	150
1980	A Marion	294	RWH Stafford	150
1981	GM Ayling	291	SA Thomas	150
1982	LM Peden	295	AG Harrison	150
1983	A Marion	289	A Marion	150
1984	DFP Richards	284	Flt Lt C Fitzpatrick	149
1985	JPS Bloomfield	290	S Belither	149
1986	G Cox	289	PG Kent	148
1987	Andrew Tucker	290	J Pugsley	150
1988	J Pugsley	290	C Mallett	148
1989	JMA Thompson	288	RE Hind	149.12
1990	JPS Bloomfield	293	HA Tomlinson	150.22
1991	Flt Lt C Fitzpatrick	293	GR Robilliard	150.21
1992	TA Ringer	287.37	AD Le Cheminant	148.11
1993	CA Brook	295.29	CA Brook	150.20
1994	ML Millar	291.34	JS Collings	149.24
1995	AJ Luckman	289.30	DGM Coleman	149.22
1996	A Marion	298.51	PB Bromley	150.27
1997	TA Ringer	299.44	PG Kent	150.26
1998	PA Bennison	300.40	Chief Tech B Jones	150.23
1999	DGM Coleman	294.37	TA Ringer	150.22
2000	JF Hossack	294.29	GC Childs	150.20
2001	TA Ringer	295.41	JMA Thompson	150.26
2002	Dr GCD Barnett	297.38	Flt Lt IW Robertson	150.28
2003	Dr GCD Barnett	297.34	Lt NJ Ball	150.27
2004	HRT Jeens	291.25	AJ Woodward	149.18
2005	JAM Paton	300.40	J Corbett	150.23
2006	JC Underwood	297.42	JC Underwood	150.23
2007	James WE Lewis	293.26	DC Luckman	150.23
2008	Zainal Abidin Md Zain	294.36	Zainal Abidin Md Zain	150.24
2009	CN Tremlett	298.44	TA Ringer	150.23
2010	Wg Cdr DP Calvert	297.37	J C Underwood	150.26
2011	ES Compton	297.35	D E Nuthall	150.24
2012	Dr JD Warburton	298.34	G E Morris	150.25
2013	J Corbett	297.46	SKC Hunter	150.19
2014	RCT Jeens	297.44	J Corbett	150.24
2015	Wg Cdr DP Calvert	294.29	J P Tapster	149.20
2016	Wg Cdr DP Calvert	297.41	HJ Golaszewski	150.28
2017	PM Patel	297.37	PM Patel	149.18
2018	DC Luckman	281.29	SJ Whitby	150.13
2019	GCD Barnett	299.47	WCP Richards	150.26
2020	DC Luckman	297.40	BJ Le Cheminant	150.24
2021	RSF Shouler	298.35	RL Furniss	150.21
2022	AP Good	293.37	Wg Cdr DP Calvert	150.28
2023	CJ Watson	297.34	CP Weeden	150.22
2024	DC Luckman	298.42	DC Luckman	150.25
2025	BK Green	299.41	GCD Barnett	150.25
2026	PM Patel	291.33	D Calvert	150.22

== See also ==
- Imperial Meeting - The NRA Meeting in which the Sovereign's Prize is contested.
- Bisley – The Queen's Prize – a BBC film following the 1986 Imperial Meeting and Queen's Prize, presented by Brian Glover.
