= Peter Jory =

British sport shooter (born 1974)

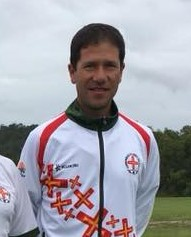
- Peter Jory, at the 2018 Commonwealth Games

Personal information
- Nationality: British
- Born: February 4, 1974 (age 52) Saint Peter Port, Guernsey
- Height: 5 ft 10 in (178 cm)
- Weight: 64 kg (141 lb)

Sport
- Country: Guernsey
- Sport: Rifle shooting
- Event: Fullbore
- Club: Guernsey Rifle Club
- Coached by: Rick Le Page
Medal record
Shooting
Representing Guernsey
Island Games
Silver medal – second place	2003 Guernsey	Fullbore singles
Silver medal – second place	2003 Guernsey	Fullbore pairs

Peter Michael Jory (/ˈdʒʊəri/, JOR-ee; born 4 February 1974) is a British sport shooter from the island of Guernsey.

== Biography ==
=== Early life ===
Born and raised in Guernsey, Jory attended Elizabeth College. At the school, Jory shot with the combined cadet force at the schools' meeting at Bisley. Jory was a member of the British Cadet Rifle Team for their tour to Canada in 1992. He later graduated from the University of Southampton with a degree in Engineering.

=== Shooting career ===
Jory is among the most capped Guernsey shooters at the NRA Imperial Meeting. In 2001, Jory set the record individual score in the Mackinnon international long-range match, scoring 100.17v (ex 100.20v), though this was later broken by Glyn Barnett in 2019, who scored 100.19v.

Jory won two silver medals at the 2003 Island Games in both the individual and pairs fullbore rifle shooting events.

Jory represented Guernsey at the 2002, 2006, 2010 and 2014 editions of the Commonwealth Games, entering both fullbore rifle events, namely the Queen's prize pairs and the Queen's prize individual competitions. His best results came in 2002 where he finished 7th in the fullbore singles event and 4th in the fullbore pairs event alongside Nick Mace. He finished 4th again in the pairs event in 2010, this time shooting alongside his brother, Adam Jory.

In 2020, Jory was appointed as shooting coach at his alma mater, Elizabeth College.

=== Motorsport ===
A popular figure in motorsport in Guernsey, Jory suffered a fractured vertebra following a crash while co-driving in the Guernsey Rally in March 2020, though he was not expected to suffer any lasting damage from the incident.

== Statistics ==
=== International competitions ===
Year	Competition	Venue	Position	Event	Notes
Representing Guernsey
2002	Commonwealth Games	Manchester, England	7th	Fullbore Rifle, Queen's Prize individual	399.51v ex 405
2002	Commonwealth Games	Manchester, England	4th	Fullbore Rifle, Queen's Prize pairs	585.69v ex 600
2003	Island Games	Fort Le Marchant, Guernsey	2nd	Fullbore Rifle, Queen's Prize individual	397 ex 405
2003	Island Games	Fort Le Marchant, Guernsey	2nd	Fullbore Rifle, Queen's Prize pairs	585 ex 600
2006	Commonwealth Games	Melbourne, Australia	11th	Fullbore Rifle, Queen's Prize individual	399.50v ex 405
2006	Commonwealth Games	Melbourne, Australia	11th	Fullbore Rifle, Queen's Prize pairs	583.74v ex 600
2010	Commonwealth Games	Delhi, India	22nd	Fullbore Rifle, Queen's Prize individual	378.19v ex 405
2010	Commonwealth Games	Delhi, India	4th	Fullbore Rifle, Queen's Prize pairs	580.51v ex 600
2014	Commonwealth Games	Glasgow, Scotland	19th	Fullbore Rifle, Queen's Prize individual	378.28v ex 405
2014	Commonwealth Games	Glasgow, Scotland	11th	Fullbore Rifle, Queen's Prize pairs	574.48v ex 600
2017	Commonwealth Championships	Brisbane, Australia	11th	Fullbore Rifle, Queen's Prize individual	393.32v ex 405
2018	Commonwealth Games	Queensland, Australia	14th	Fullbore Rifle, Queen's Prize individual	399.37v ex 405
2018	Commonwealth Games	Queensland, Australia	9th	Fullbore Rifle, Queen's Prize pairs	575.45v ex 600
