= Daniel Rivers =

British sport shooter (born 1991)

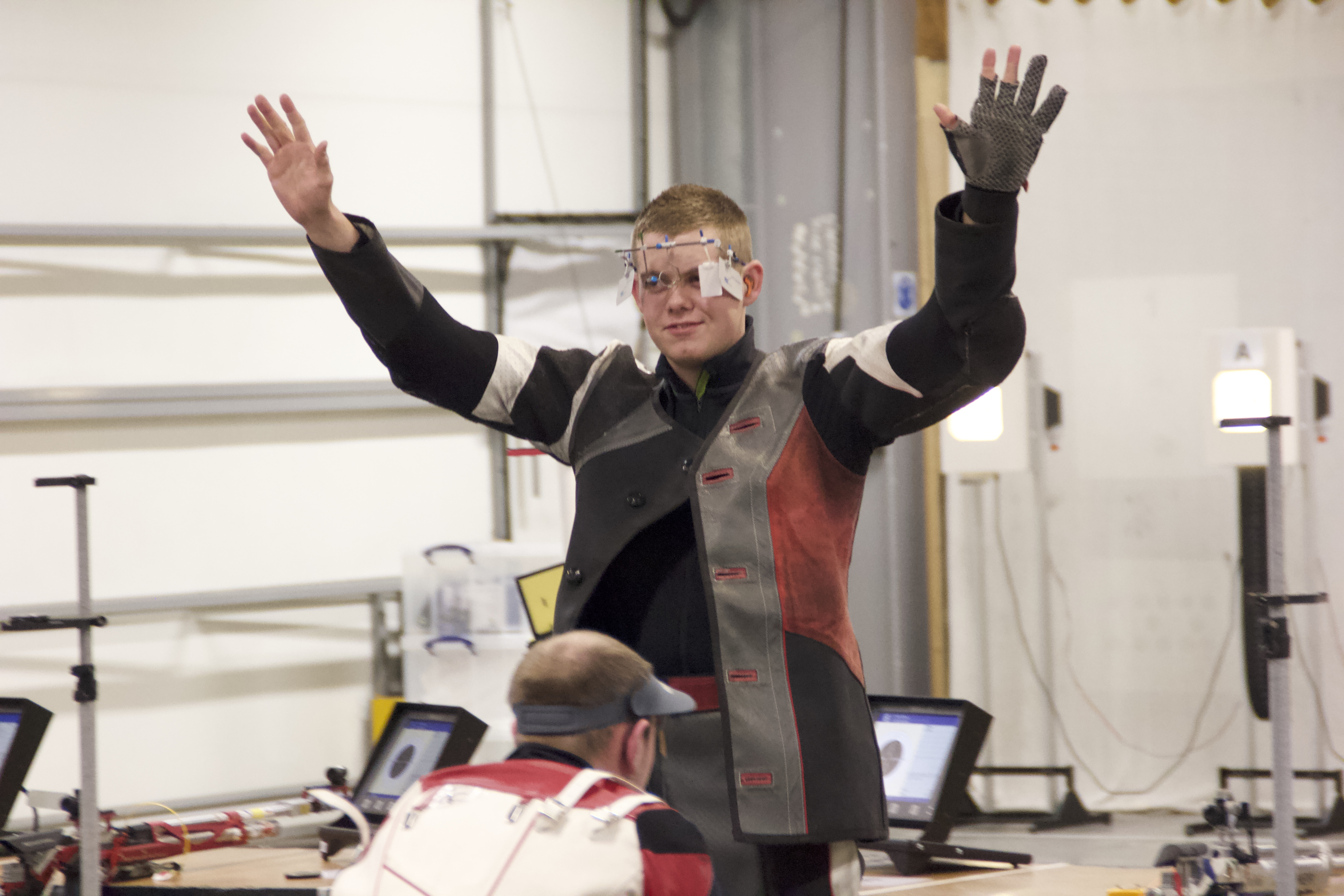
- Dan Rivers wins the Mens Air Rifle Final at the NSRA British Airgun Championship 2014

Personal information
- Nickname: Dan
- Nationality: United Kingdom
- Born: 12 June 1991 (age 35) Oxford, England
- Height: 5 ft 10 in (178 cm)
- Weight: 85 kg (187 lb)

Sport
- Country: England
- Sport: Sport shooter
- Event: Rifle shooting
Medal record
Representing England
Men's shooting
Commonwealth Games
Gold medal – first place	2014 Glasgow	50 metre rifle three positions
Bronze medal – third place	2014 Glasgow	10 metre air rifle
- Updated on 7 September 2014

Daniel Rivers (born 12 June 1991) is a British sport shooter. He competed for England in the 50 metre rifle three positions and the 10 metre air rifle events at the 2014 Commonwealth Games where he won a gold and bronze medal respectively.

== Sporting career ==
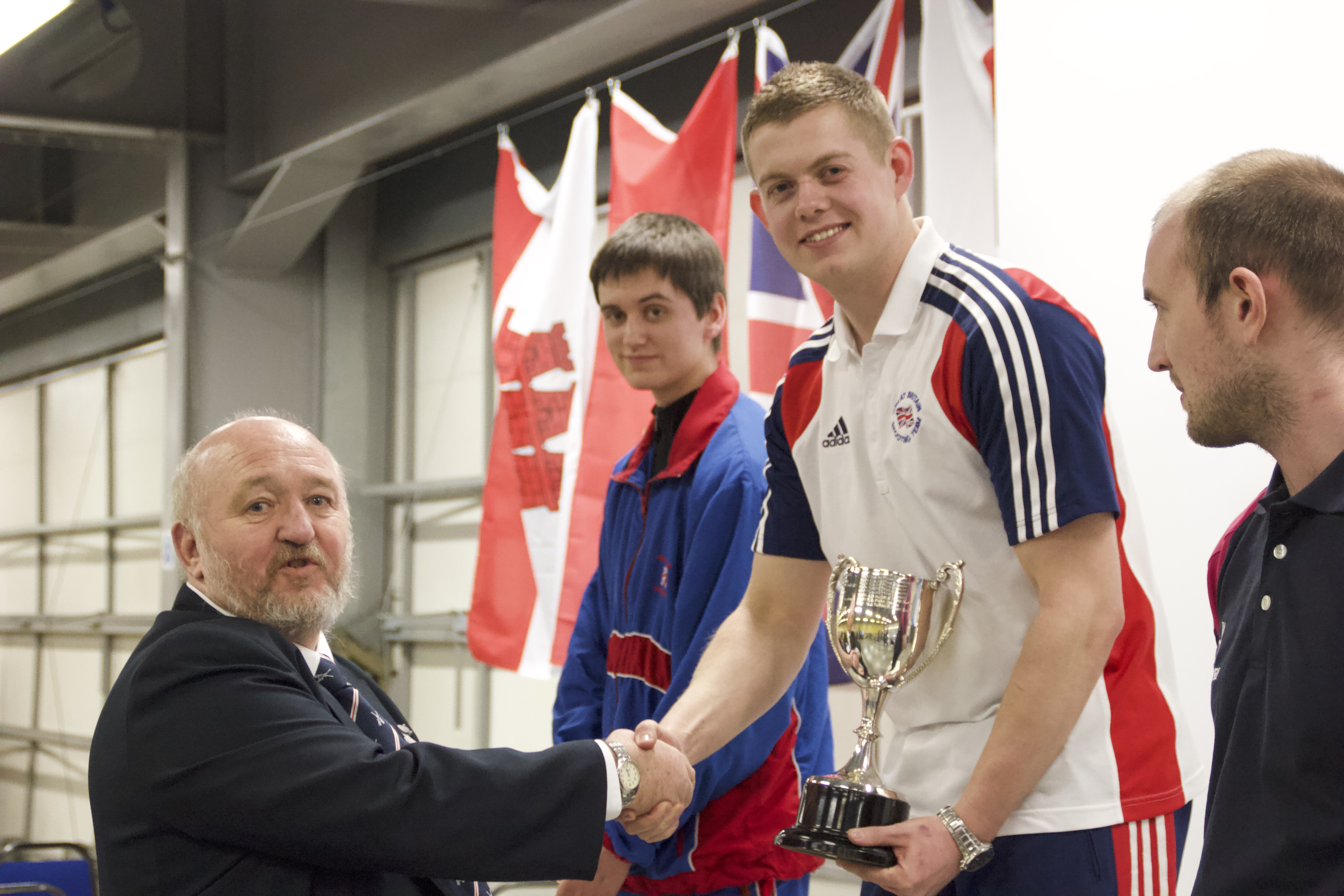
Dan Rivers presented with Men's Air Rifle Trophy at NSRA British Airgun Championship 2014

In February 2014 Rivers won the Men's 10m air rifle at the NSRA British Open Air Gun (BOAG) Championship, becoming British Champion.

In April 2014 he was selected to represent England at the 2014 Commonwealth Games. He went on to win Bronze in the 10m air rifle, and Gold in the 50m 3-position rifle.
