= Chris Watson (sport shooter) =

British sport shooter

Christopher John Watson
Personal information
- Citizenship: United Kingdom
- Born: 29 October 1978 (age 47) Northampton, UK
- Height: 169 cm (5 ft 7 in)
- Weight: 70 kg (154 lb)

Sport
- Country: Great Britain; Wales
- Sport: Shooting sport
- Event: Fullbore target rifle
- Coached by: Martin Watkins
Medal record
Representing Wales
Commonwealth Games
Silver medal – second place	2018 Gold Coast	Queen's Prize Pairs

Christopher John Watson (born 29 October 1978) is a British sports shooter. Shooting fullbore target rifle, he has competed for Great Britain in numerous GB Tours and Palma Matches. He has represented Wales at the Commonwealth Games. In 2023 he won the King's Prize at Bisley. He has a brother James Watson who is also capped for Great Britain.

== Career ==
Watson has toured with the Great Britain Fullbore Rifle Team to New Zealand, Australia, USA, Canada, Trinidad, Barbados and the Channel Islands. He was selected as a reserve for the 2023 GB Tour to South Africa. In 2025 he was Vice Captain of the GB Team Tour to Canada.

Watson was selected to represent Wales at the 2014 Commonwealth Games. He finished 13th in the Queen's Prize Individual and 7th in the pairs alongside Gareth Morris.

In 2018, he was again selected with Gareth Morris. They won silver in the Queen's Prize Pairs.

Having previously competed in 18 Queen's Finals, Watson won the historic King's Prize at the 2023 NRA Imperial Meeting at Bisley. This was the first edition of the match since the death of Queen Elizabeth II, making it the first "King's Prize" since 1951.

This win completed the trio of the King's Prize (2023) the St. George's Prize (2019) and the Grand Aggregate (2017). A feat only achieved by 6 people in the history of the sport.
