= Diane Collings =

New Zealand sport shooter

Personal information
- Born: Diane Rosalind Blaymires; 5 June 1959 (age 67)
- Spouse: Mike Collings

Sport
- Country: New Zealand
- Sport: Shooting
- Club: Te Puke Rifle Club

Achievements and titles
- National finals: Ballinger Belt winner (1981, 1987, 2014)
Medal record
Representing New Zealand
Shooting
Commonwealth Games
Bronze medal – third place	2002 Manchester	Fullbore - open

Diane Rosalind Collings (née Blaymires; born 5 June 1959) is a New Zealand sport shooter.

At the 2002 Commonwealth Games she won the bronze medal in the fullbore open singles and finished seventh in the fullbore rifle open pairs.

Collings has won the Ballinger Belt three times at the New Zealand rifle shooting championships, in 1981, 1987 and 2014. In 1992 she was top New Zealander and sixth overall. She is married to sport shooter Mike Collings.
