= Andrew Luckman =

British sport shooter

Personal information
- Nationality: English
- Born: 1972 (age 53–54) Taunton, Somerset
Medal record
Sports shooting
Representing England
Commonwealth Games
Bronze medal – third place	1998 Kuala Lumpur	fullbore rifle

Andrew James Luckman (born 1972) is a British retired sport shooter.

== Sport shooting career ==
In 1995, he won the Queen's Prize at the NRA Imperial Meeting at Bisley Camp.

He represented England and won a bronze medal in the fullbore rifle Queens Prize, at the 1998 Commonwealth Games in Kuala Lumpur, Malaysia.

== Personal life ==
He is the older brother of the four times Commonwealth Games gold medallist David Luckman.
