= James Paton (sport shooter) =

Canadian sport shooter

Medal record

Shooting

Commonwealth Games
Gold medal – first place	1998 Kuala Lumpur	Queen's Prize individual
Silver medal – second place	1998 Kuala Lumpur	Queen's Prize pairs
Silver medal – second place	2014 Glasgow	Queen's Prize individual
Silver medal – second place	2014 Glasgow	Queen's Prize pairs

Commonwealth Shooting Championships
Gold medal – first place	1997 Kualu Lumpur	Queen's prize individual

James Paton (born 24 May 1957 in Newcastle is a sport shooter from Canada.

At the 1997 Commonwealth Shooting Championships in Kuala Lumpur he won the fullbore rifle event.

The following year at the 1998 Commonwealth Games (also in Kuala Lumpur) he won the gold medal in the fullbore rifle open individual event and silver in the pairs event (with Alain Marion).

At the 2014 Commonwealth Games in Glasgow, he won silver medals in the fullbore rifle individual and pairs events (this time with Desmond Vamplew).

In 2005, he won the Queen's Prize at the NRA Imperial Meeting at Bisley, matching the record score of 300.40v.
