= John Snowden (sport shooter) =

New Zealand sport shooter

Personal information
- Born: 16 January 1969 (age 57) Ashburton, New Zealand
- Height: 1.71 m (5 ft 7 in)

Sport
- Country: New Zealand
- Sport: Shooting

Achievements and titles
- National finals: Ballinger Belt winner (2013, 2018, 2023)
Medal record
Men's shooting
Representing New Zealand
Commonwealth Games
Gold medal – first place	2010 Delhi	Full bore rifle pairs

John Snowden (born 16 January 1969) is a sport shooter from New Zealand.

At the 2006 Commonwealth Games in Melbourne, he competed in the full bore rifle open singles and open pairs.

At the 2010 Commonwealth Games in Delhi, he won a gold medal in the full bore rifle open pairs with Mike Collings. He also competed in the full bore rifle open singles, finishing 13th.

In 2013, Snowden won the Ballinger Belt at the New Zealand rifle shooting championships.

Snowden competed at the 2014 Commonwealth Games in Glasgow, finishing 18th in the Queen's prize individual, and eighth with Mike Collings in the Queen's prize pairs.

In 2018, Snowden won his second Ballinger Belt. He won the Ballinger Belt for a third time in 2023.
