= British Cadet Rifle Team =

The British Cadet Rifle Team, also known as The Athelings, are a team of eighteen cadets selected from the Community Cadet Forces and Combined Cadet Force of the United Kingdom. Every year applications are submitted in the Autumn term and a selection committee with twelve members choose the best eighteen applications, and name an additional three non-travelling reserves. These selected cadets then shoot at the British National Rifle Association's Imperial Meeting in July before flying to Canada to compete with the Royal Canadian Army Cadets and shoot at the Dominion of Canada meeting held at Connaught Cadet Training Centre.

== History ==
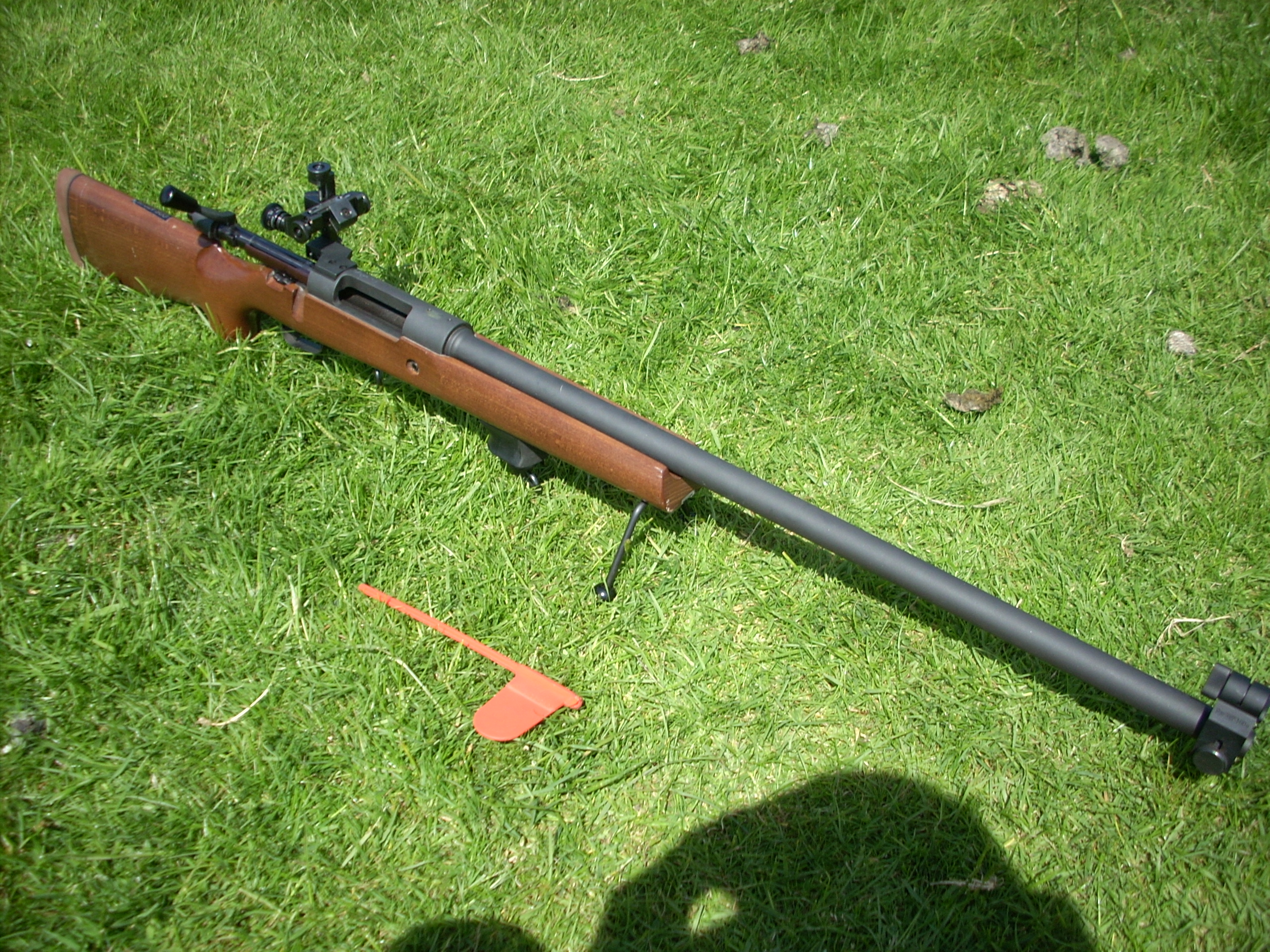
The first stage of the Rex Goddard match is shot at Bisley, firing the L81 A2 Cadet Target Rifle.

The Athelings was started in 1910 when cadets from Australia, New Zealand and Canada came to shoot in England. This followed by subsequent exchanges that took place through the Imperial Cadet Association, founded in 1908 by Captain RJE Hanson. These early exchanges were well received and regular exchanges where started in 1928. This was also the period in which the term "Athelings" was introduced by Hanson to describe the members of the teams who go overseas to represent their country. Ætheling was an Old English word meaning "young noble".

== Results ==
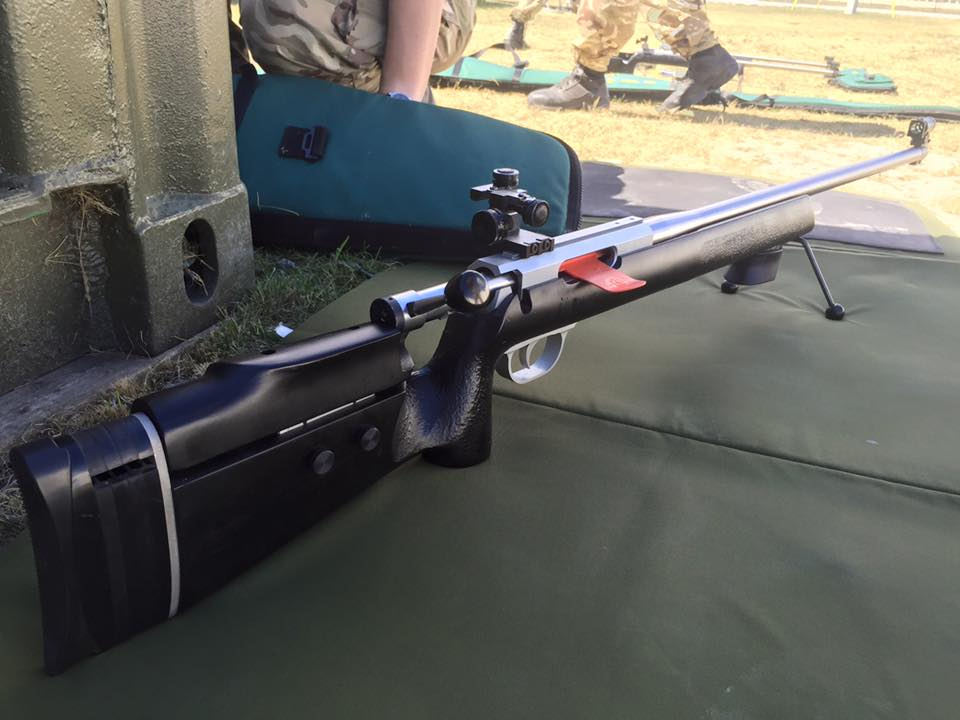
The C12 Cadet Target Rifle, shot by the Athelings during the Cadet Meeting at Connaught.

Results to 2016
Match	Canada	Athelings (UK)
Michael Faraday	39	33
Alexander G Bell	11	52
Rex Goddard	12	17
