= David Luckman =

British sport shooter (born 1976)

Personal information
- Full name: David Charles Luckman
- Nationality: British
- Born: 21 April 1976 (age 50) Taunton, England
- Height: 6 ft 0 in (183 cm)
- Weight: 78 kg (172 lb)
- Relative: Andrew Luckman (brother)

Sport
- Country: England
- Sport: Sport shooter
- Event: Fullbore Target Rifle
Medal record
Men's shooting
Representing England
Commonwealth Games
Gold medal – first place	2014 Glasgow	Queen's Prize individual
Gold medal – first place	2014 Glasgow	Queen's Prize pairs
Gold medal – first place	2018 Gold Coast	Queen's Prize individual
Gold medal – first place	2018 Gold Coast	Queen's Prize pairs
Commonwealth Championships
Gold medal – first place	2017 Brisbane	Fullbore individual
Gold medal – first place	2017 Brisbane	Fullbore pairs

David Charles Luckman (born 21 April 1976) is a British sport shooter.

== Personal life ==
Luckman was born in Taunton, Somerset and learned to shoot at Sedgemoor Target Shooting Club in Burnham-on-Sea.

He is the younger brother of the Commonwealth Games bronze medallist Andrew Luckman.

== Sport shooting career ==
Luckman's first GB Overseas Tour was to Australia in 1997. He has toured a total of 18 times and earned 57 GB caps.

He was a member of the 2003 GB team that won the Palma Match. On the 2007 tour to Canada he won the Canadian Open Target Rifle Championship. He won the 2007 Grand Aggregate at the Imperial Meeting.

Luckman won gold medals in both the Queen's prize individual and pairs events at the 2014 Commonwealth Games whilst competing for England.

In 2017 at the Commonwealth Shooting Championships, Luckman won both the individual and pairs fullbore events. Four years later he sealed another double gold medal success at the 2018 Commonwealth Games paired with Parag Patel.

He has won the prestigious Sovereign's Prize three times, in 2018, 2020 and 2024.
