= Barry Buddon Training Area =

Ministry of Defence-owned rifle range and training area in Barry, Angus, Scotland

Barry Buddon
- Barry, Angus
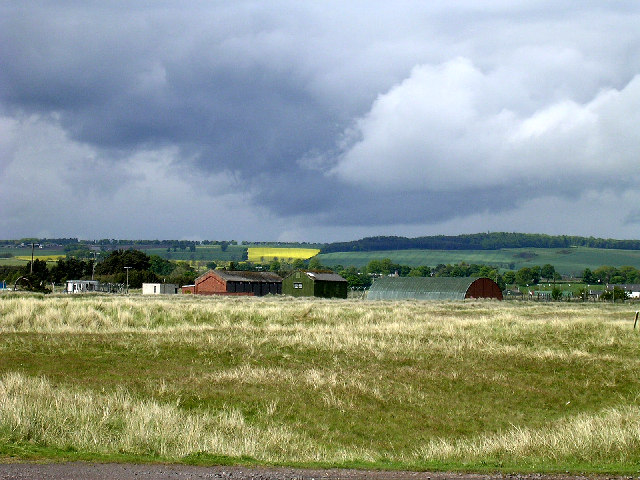
- Barry Buddon Camp

Site information
- Type: Barracks
- Owner: Ministry of Defence
- Operator: British Army

Location
- Location within Angus
- Coordinates: 56°28′50″N 2°45′15″W

Site history
- Built: c.1850
- Built for: War Office
- In use: c.1850 – present

Barry Buddon Training Area is a Ministry of Defence-owned rifle range and training area in Barry, Angus, Scotland, which runs adjacent to Carnoustie Golf Links and the Dundee - Aberdeen railway Line.

== History ==
Barry Buddon dates back to around 1850 when the area was used by the Forfarshire Rifle Volunteers, the Fife and Forfar Yeomanry, the Panmure Battery of the Forfarshire Artillery Brigade, and a Royal Naval Reserve Battery. In 1897 the Earl of Dalhousie sold the site to the War Office for use as a military training area.

The training area covers 2,300 acres (930 hectares), of which 600 acres (240 hectares) is intertidal zone. The camp was expanded in the late 1990s and has accommodation for 507. With all camps and facilities at maximum usage about 130,000 personnel could use the training area each year. The ranges were used in the 1986 Commonwealth Games and the 2014 Commonwealth Games.

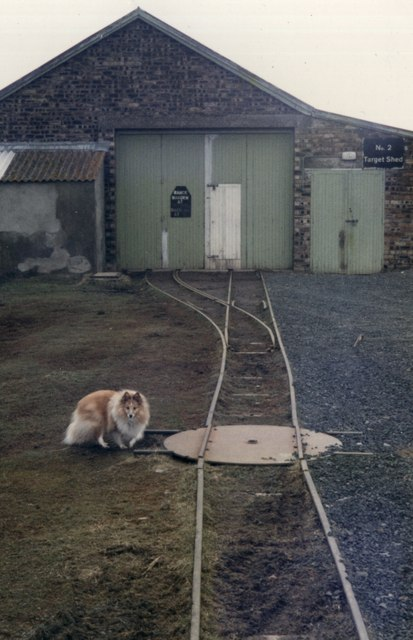
Engine shed of the narrow gauge railway on the Barry Buddon range

The Barry Buddon range used a narrow gauge railway with an armoured diesel locomotive to pull moving targets on railway wagons to be used for gunnery practice.

Most of the training area is within Barry Links, which is a Site of Special Scientific Interest (SSSI) and an EU Special Area of Conservation (SAC), as well as a Special Protection Area (SPA) for birds under the European Birds Directive.

== See also ==
- List of Commonwealth Games venues
