= Mike Collings =

New Zealand sport shooter

Personal information
- Born: Michael John Collings; 29 September 1954 (age 71) Lower Hutt, New Zealand
- Height: 1.76 m (5 ft 9 in)
- Spouse: Diane Collings

Sport
- Country: New Zealand
- Sport: Shooting
- Club: Te Puke Rifle Club

Achievements and titles
- National finals: Ballinger Belt winner (1998, 2021, 2022, 2024, 2026)
Medal record
Men's shooting
Representing New Zealand
Commonwealth Games
Gold medal – first place	2010 Delhi	Full bore rifle pairs

Michael John Collings (born 29 September 1954) is a sport shooter from New Zealand.

At the 2002 Commonwealth Games in Manchester he was 21st in the full bore rifle open singles and seventh in the full bore rifle open pairs.

At the 2010 Commonwealth Games in Delhi he won a gold medal in the full bore rifle open pairs with John Snowden. He also competed in the full bore rifle open singles, finishing fourth.

Collings won the Ballinger Belt at the 1998 New Zealand rifle shooting championships. In 2009 he finished second and was top New Zealander. He won back-to-back Ballinger Belts in 2021 and 2022, becoming the first person in the history of the event, dating back to 1873, to successfully defend the trophy. He won the Ballinger Belt again in 2024 and 2026.

Collings is married to fellow sport shooter Diane Collings. His father, Dennis Collings, won the Ballinger Belt in 1977, and his brother, Ross Collings, did the same in 1993.
