= Ian Shaw (sport shooter) =

British sport shooter (born 1968)

Personal information
- Nationality: United Kingdom
- Born: 25 April 1968 (age 58) Chatham, England
- Height: 6 ft 2 in (188 cm)
- Weight: 105 kg (231 lb)

Sport
- Country: Scotland
- Sport: Sport shooter
Medal record
Representing Scotland
Men's shooting
Commonwealth Games
Silver medal – second place	2010 Delhi	Fullbore pairs
Bronze medal – third place	2014 Glasgow	Queen's Prize pairs
Bronze medal – third place	2018 Gold Coast	Queen's Prize pairs
Commonwealth Championships
Bronze medal – third place	2017 Brisbane	Fullbore pairs
- Updated on 26 April 2018

Ian Shaw (born 25 April 1968) is a British sport shooter. He competed for Scotland in the Queen's prize pairs event at the 2014 Commonwealth Games where he won a bronze medal.
