= Desmond Vamplew =

Canadian sport shooter (born 1955)

Personal information
- Born: 20 August 1955 (age 71) Toronto, Ontario, Canada
Medal record
Shooting
Commonwealth Games
| Gold medal – first place | 1978 Edmonton | Men's/Open fullbore rifle |
| Silver medal – second place | 2014 Glasgow | Queen's prize pairs |

Desmond G. Vamplew (born 20 August 1955) is a sport shooter from Canada. He won the gold medal in the men's/open fullbore rifle event at the 1978 Commonwealth Games in Edmonton, and the silver medal in the Queen's Prize fullbore rifle pairs event (with James Paton) at the 2014 Commonwealth Games in Glasgow.
