= Angus McLeod (sport shooter) =

British sport shooter (born 1964)

Personal information
- Nationality: United Kingdom
- Born: Edinburgh, Scotland
- Height: 6 ft 2 in (188 cm)
- Weight: 93 kg (205 lb)

Sport
- Country: Scotland
- Sport: Sport shooter
Medal record
Representing Scotland
shooting
Commonwealth Games
| Silver medal – second place | 2010 Delhi | Full bore rifle open pairs |
| Bronze medal – third place | 2014 Glasgow | Queen's prize pairs |
- Updated on 7 September 2014

Angus McLeod (born 5 March 1964) is a British sport shooter. He competed for Scotland in the Queen's prize pairs event at the 2014 Commonwealth Games where he won a bronze medal.
