= Electoral results for the Division of Hunter =

Election results for federal seat of Hunter, New South Wales, Australia

This is a list of electoral results for the Division of Hunter in Australian federal elections from the division's creation in 1901 until the present.

== Members ==
Member	Party	Term
(Sir) Edmund Barton	Protectionist	1901–1903
Frank Liddell	Free Trade	1903–1910
Matthew Charlton	Labor	1910–1928
Rowley James	Labor	1928–1931
Rowley James	Labor (NSW)	1931–1936
Rowley James	Labor	1936–1958
H.V. Evatt	Labor	1958–1960
Bert James	Labor	1960–1980
Bob Brown	Labor	1980–1984
Eric Fitzgibbon	Labor	1984–1996
Joel Fitzgibbon	Labor	1996–2022
Dan Repacholi	Labor	2022–present

== Election results ==
=== Elections in the 2020s ===
==== 2025 ====
2025 Australian federal election: Hunter
Party	Candidate	Votes	%	±%
Labor	Dan Repacholi	48,582	43.50	+4.07
National	Sue Gilroy	20,290	18.17	−6.51
One Nation	Stuart Bonds	18,011	16.13	+6.04
Greens	Louise Stokes	8,286	7.42	−1.40
Legalise Cannabis	Andrew Fenwick	5,655	5.06	+5.06
Trumpet of Patriots	Suellen Wrightson	4,068	3.64	+3.64
Family First	Paul Farrelly	2,644	2.37	+2.37
Shooters, Fishers, Farmers	Kyle Boddan	2,507	2.24	+2.24
Animal Justice	Victoria Davies	1,629	1.46	−0.61
Total formal votes		111,672	91.95	−0.68
Informal votes		9,782	8.05	+0.68
Turnout		121,454	91.88	+4.29
Notional two-party-preferred count
Labor	Dan Repacholi	66,424	59.48	+4.70
National	Sue Gilroy	45,248	40.52	−4.70
Two-candidate-preferred result
Labor	Dan Repacholi	65,926	59.04	+4.26
One Nation	Stuart Bonds	45,746	40.96	+40.96
Labor hold				

==== 2022 ====
2022 Australian federal election: Hunter
Party	Candidate	Votes	%	±%
Labor	Dan Repacholi	41,514	38.54	+0.97
National	James Thomson	29,540	27.42	+3.95
One Nation	Dale McNamara	10,759	9.99	−11.60
Greens	Janet Murray	9,562	8.88	+2.01
Independent	Stuart Bonds	6,126	5.69	+5.69
United Australia	Geoff Passfield	4,370	4.06	−0.26
Animal Justice	Victoria Davies	2,469	2.29	−0.91
Independent	Scott Laruffa	1,929	1.79	+1.79
Informed Medical Options	Cathy Townsend	1,458	1.35	+1.35
Total formal votes		107,727	92.37	+1.34
Informal votes		8,901	7.63	−1.34
Turnout		116,628	90.85	−1.44
Two-party-preferred result
Labor	Dan Repacholi	58,200	54.03	+1.05
National	James Thomson	49,527	45.97	−1.05
Labor hold		Swing	+1.05	

Alluvial diagram for preference flows in the seat of Hunter in the 2022 federal election. indicates at what stage the winning candidate had over 50% of the votes and was declared the winner.

=== Elections in the 2010s ===
==== 2019 ====
2019 Australian federal election: Hunter
Party	Candidate	Votes	%	±%
Labor	Joel Fitzgibbon	38,331	37.57	−14.22
National	Josh Angus	23,942	23.47	−2.87
One Nation	Stuart Bonds	22,029	21.59	+21.59
Greens	Janet Murray	7,007	6.87	−0.22
United Australia	Paul Davies	4,407	4.32	+4.32
Animal Justice	James Murphy	3,267	3.20	+3.20
Christian Democrats	Richard Stretton	2,356	2.31	−1.07
Socialist Equality	Max Boddy	687	0.67	+0.67
Total formal votes		102,026	91.03	−1.09
Informal votes		10,049	8.97	+1.09
Turnout		112,075	92.29	−0.04
Two-party-preferred result
Labor	Joel Fitzgibbon	54,050	52.98	−9.48
National	Josh Angus	47,976	47.02	+9.48
Labor hold		Swing	−9.48	

==== 2016 ====
2016 Australian federal election: Hunter
Party	Candidate	Votes	%	±%
Labor	Joel Fitzgibbon	49,962	51.79	+7.08
National	Ruth Rogers	25,409	26.34	+9.65
Greens	Peter Morris	6,842	7.09	+1.00
Independent	John Harvey	4,740	4.91	+4.91
Christian Democrats	Richard Stretton	3,260	3.38	+0.79
Independent	Cordelia Troy	3,216	3.33	+3.33
Independent	John Warham	1,934	2.00	+2.00
Independent	Arjay Martin	1,103	1.14	+1.14
Total formal votes		96,466	92.12	−1.26
Informal votes		8,249	7.88	+1.26
Turnout		104,715	92.33	−0.47
Two-party-preferred result
Labor	Joel Fitzgibbon	60,255	62.46	+6.78
National	Ruth Rogers	36,211	37.54	−6.78
Labor hold		Swing	+6.78	

==== 2013 ====
2013 Australian federal election: Hunter
Party	Candidate	Votes	%	±%
Labor	Joel Fitzgibbon	38,241	44.50	−9.81
National	Michael Johnsen	30,170	35.11	+4.06
Palmer United	Jennifer Stefanac	6,552	7.62	+7.62
Greens	David Atwell	5,066	5.89	−3.03
One Nation	Bill Fox	3,245	3.78	+0.43
Christian Democrats	Richard Stretton	1,834	2.13	−0.25
Citizens Electoral Council	Ann Lawler	833	0.97	+0.97
Total formal votes		85,941	93.46	−0.33
Informal votes		6,014	6.54	+0.33
Turnout		91,955	94.51	−0.22
Two-party-preferred result
Labor	Joel Fitzgibbon	46,125	53.67	−8.81
National	Michael Johnsen	39,816	46.33	+8.81
Labor hold		Swing	−8.81	

==== 2010 ====
2010 Australian federal election: Hunter
Party	Candidate	Votes	%	±%
Labor	Joel Fitzgibbon	44,159	54.31	−5.28
National	Michael Johnsen	25,245	31.05	+3.83
Greens	Chris Parker	7,251	8.92	+2.60
One Nation	Jennifer Leayr	2,721	3.35	+3.35
Christian Democrats	Wayne Riley	1,938	2.38	+0.34
Total formal votes		81,314	93.79	−1.94
Informal votes		5,383	6.21	+1.94
Turnout		86,697	94.73	−1.23
Two-party-preferred result
Labor	Joel Fitzgibbon	50,803	62.48	−3.20
National	Michael Johnsen	30,511	37.52	+3.20
Labor hold		Swing	−3.20	

=== Elections in the 2000s ===
==== 2007 ====
2007 Australian federal election: Hunter
Party	Candidate	Votes	%	±%
Labor	Joel Fitzgibbon	49,561	59.95	+8.64
National	Beth Black	22,328	27.01	−2.89
Greens	Jan Davis	5,265	6.37	+0.11
Climate Change	John Harvey	2,500	3.02	+3.02
Christian Democrats	Bernie Neville	1,736	2.10	+0.36
Citizens Electoral Council	Daniel Albury	1,287	1.56	−1.33
Total formal votes		82,677	95.71	+0.95
Informal votes		3,710	4.29	−0.95
Turnout		86,387	95.77	+0.19
Two-party-preferred result
Labor	Joel Fitzgibbon	54,504	65.92	+4.83
National	Beth Black	28,173	34.08	−4.83
Labor hold		Swing	+4.83	

==== 2004 ====
2004 Australian federal election: Hunter
Party	Candidate	Votes	%	±%
Labor	Joel Fitzgibbon	43,216	53.60	+1.28
National	Beth Black	21,621	26.81	−0.69
Greens	Kerry Suwald	5,195	6.44	+1.92
Independent	Bill Fox	2,618	3.25	+3.25
Citizens Electoral Council	Ann Lawler	2,590	3.21	+1.76
One Nation	Neil Scholes	2,543	3.15	−7.16
Christian Democrats	Adrian Melbourne	1,673	2.07	+2.07
Family First	Michael Woods	1,176	1.46	+1.46
Total formal votes		80,632	94.70	−1.88
Informal votes		4,512	5.30	+1.88
Turnout		85,144	95.67	−0.46
Two-party-preferred result
Labor	Joel Fitzgibbon	51,401	63.75	+2.89
National	Beth Black	29,231	36.25	−2.89
Labor hold		Swing	+2.89	

==== 2001 ====
2001 Australian federal election: Hunter
Party	Candidate	Votes	%	±%
Labor	Joel Fitzgibbon	41,123	52.32	−2.94
National	Rob Macaulay	21,613	27.50	+21.95
One Nation	Bill Fox	8,100	10.31	+0.43
Greens	Larry O'Brien	3,553	4.52	+2.30
Democrats	Rod Bennison	3,071	3.91	+1.16
Citizens Electoral Council	Ann Lawler	1,137	1.45	+0.91
Total formal votes		78,597	96.58	−0.20
Informal votes		2,780	3.42	+0.20
Turnout		81,377	96.76	
Two-party-preferred result
Labor	Joel Fitzgibbon	47,838	60.86	−3.83
National	Rob Macaulay	30,759	39.14	+39.14
Labor hold		Swing	−3.83	

=== Elections in the 1990s ===
==== 1998 ====
1998 Australian federal election: Hunter
Party	Candidate	Votes	%	±%
Labor	Joel Fitzgibbon	39,187	54.63	+3.88
Liberal	Cherrilyn McLean	11,919	16.62	+16.62
One Nation	Darren Culley	8,131	11.33	+11.33
National	Rob Macaulay	7,976	11.12	−25.92
Democrats	Rod Bennison	2,278	3.18	−1.91
Greens	James Ryan	1,433	2.00	−2.15
Citizens Electoral Council	Ann Lawler	362	0.50	+0.50
Australia First	Peter Meddows	296	0.41	+0.41
Socialist Equality	Terry Cook	152	0.21	+0.21
Total formal votes		71,734	96.71	−0.63
Informal votes		2,441	3.29	+0.63
Turnout		74,175	96.16	−0.89
Two-party-preferred result
Labor	Joel Fitzgibbon	46,405	64.69	+7.72
Liberal	Cherrilyn McLean	25,329	35.31	+35.31
Labor hold		Swing	+7.72	

==== 1996 ====
1996 Australian federal election: Hunter
Party	Candidate	Votes	%	±%
Labor	Joel Fitzgibbon	36,674	50.74	−9.85
National	Michael Johnsen	26,767	37.04	+19.64
Democrats	Rod Bennison	3,672	5.08	+5.08
Greens	Jenny Vaughan	3,000	4.15	+4.15
Independent	Bernard Burke	2,160	2.99	+2.99
Total formal votes		72,273	97.34	−0.30
Informal votes		1,976	2.66	+0.30
Turnout		74,249	97.05	+0.52
Two-party-preferred result
Labor	Joel Fitzgibbon	41,003	56.97	−6.95
National	Michael Johnsen	30,976	43.03	+6.95
Labor hold		Swing	−6.95	

==== 1993 ====
1993 Australian federal election: Hunter
Party	Candidate	Votes	%	±%
Labor	Eric Fitzgibbon	43,068	60.60	+9.61
Liberal	Chris Barnes	13,637	19.19	+2.83
National	Bruce Crossing	12,366	17.40	−1.69
Natural Law	Robert Walker	2,004	2.82	+2.82
Total formal votes		71,075	97.64	−0.17
Informal votes		1,719	2.36	+0.17
Turnout		72,794	96.53	
Two-party-preferred result
Labor	Eric Fitzgibbon	45,414	63.92	+4.87
Liberal	Chris Barnes	25,638	36.08	−4.87
Labor hold		Swing	+4.87	

==== 1990 ====
1990 Australian federal election: Hunter
Party	Candidate	Votes	%	±%
Labor	Eric Fitzgibbon	34,099	49.2	+0.3
Liberal	Ashley Saunders	19,145	27.6	+7.4
Democrats	Chris Richards	8,717	12.6	+6.6
National	Alison Davey	7,312	10.6	−14.2
Total formal votes		69,273	97.9	
Informal votes		1,483	2.1	
Turnout		70,756	96.7	
Two-party-preferred result
Labor	Eric Fitzgibbon	40,403	58.4	+4.9
Liberal	Ashley Saunders	28,724	41.6	−4.9
Labor hold		Swing	+4.9	

=== Elections in the 1980s ===
==== 1987 ====
1987 Australian federal election: Hunter
Party	Candidate	Votes	%	±%
Labor	Eric Fitzgibbon	31,656	48.9	+1.6
National	John Turner	16,067	24.8	+4.3
Liberal	Graham Dunkley	13,053	20.2	−7.1
Democrats	Maureen Simpson	3,902	6.0	+1.1
Total formal votes		64,678	96.6	
Informal votes		2,267	3.4	
Turnout		66,945	96.0	
Two-party-preferred result
Labor	Eric Fitzgibbon	34,685	53.6	+1.2
National	John Turner	29,993	46.4	+46.4
Labor hold		Swing	+1.2	

==== 1984 ====
1984 Australian federal election: Hunter
Party	Candidate	Votes	%	±%
Labor	Eric Fitzgibbon	28,589	47.3	−3.2
Liberal	Ron Dolton	16,483	27.3	+20.8
National	John Turner	12,420	20.5	−14.3
Democrats	Warren Reid	2,952	4.9	−2.6
Total formal votes		60,444	95.1	
Informal votes		3,101	4.9	
Turnout		63,545	95.7	
Two-party-preferred result
Labor	Eric Fitzgibbon	31,642	52.4	−2.6
Liberal	Ron Dolton	28,789	47.6	+47.6
Labor hold		Swing	−2.6	

==== 1983 ====
1983 Australian federal election: Hunter
Party	Candidate	Votes	%	±%
Labor	Bob Brown	54,213	68.1	+0.2
Liberal	James White	19,508	24.5	−2.0
Democrats	Edwina Wilson	5,942	7.5	+1.9
Total formal votes		79,663	98.2	
Informal votes		1,492	1.8	
Turnout		81,155	95.9	
Two-party-preferred result
Labor	Bob Brown		72.6	+1.3
Liberal	James White		27.4	−1.3
Labor hold		Swing	+1.3	

==== 1980 ====
1980 Australian federal election: Hunter
Party	Candidate	Votes	%	±%
Labor	Bob Brown	51,061	67.9	+7.2
Liberal	Ashley Saunders	19,896	26.5	−1.3
Democrats	Edwina Wilson	4,227	5.6	−5.9
Total formal votes		75,184	98.1	
Informal votes		1,454	1.9	
Turnout		76,638	95.7	
Two-party-preferred result
Labor	Bob Brown		71.3	+4.8
Liberal	Ashley Saunders		28.7	−4.8
Labor hold		Swing	+4.8	

=== Elections in the 1970s ===
==== 1977 ====
1977 Australian federal election: Hunter
Party	Candidate	Votes	%	±%
Labor	Bert James	42,076	60.7	−5.8
Liberal	Oliver Fennell	19,299	27.8	−5.7
Democrats	Elisabeth Kirkby	7,944	11.5	+11.5
Total formal votes		69,319	98.0	
Informal votes		1,383	2.0	
Turnout		70,702	96.3	
Two-party-preferred result
Labor	Bert James		66.5	+0.0
Liberal	Oliver Fennell		32.5	+0.0
Labor hold		Swing	+0.0	

==== 1975 ====
1975 Australian federal election: Hunter
Party	Candidate	Votes	%	±%
Labor	Bert James	43,590	68.4	−4.2
Liberal	Stephen Walker	20,100	31.6	+6.7
Total formal votes		63,690	98.3	
Informal votes		1,114	1.7	
Turnout		64,804	96.6	
Labor hold		Swing	−5.6	

==== 1974 ====
1974 Australian federal election: Hunter
Party	Candidate	Votes	%	±%
Labor	Bert James	44,987	72.6	−2.5
Liberal	Alex Bevan	15,442	24.9	+0.0
Australia	Des Kynaston	1,501	2.4	+2.4
Total formal votes		61,930	98.5	
Informal votes		954	1.5	
Turnout		62,884	97.1	
Two-party-preferred result
Labor	Bert James		74.0	−1.1
Liberal	Alex Bevan		26.0	+1.1
Labor hold		Swing	−1.1	

==== 1972 ====
1972 Australian federal election: Hunter
Party	Candidate	Votes	%	±%
Labor	Bert James	40,631	75.1	+1.6
Liberal	Stanley Gumbleton	13,436	24.9	−1.6
Total formal votes		54,067	98.1	
Informal votes		1,041	1.9	
Turnout		55,108	96.8	
Labor hold		Swing	+1.6	

=== Elections in the 1960s ===
==== 1969 ====
1969 Australian federal election: Hunter
Party	Candidate	Votes	%	±%
Labor	Bert James	36,504	73.5	+4.3
Liberal	Raymond Hughes	13,159	26.5	+4.1
Total formal votes		49,663	97.6	
Informal votes		1,205	2.4	
Turnout		50,868	96.1	
Labor hold		Swing	+2.6	

==== 1966 ====
1966 Australian federal election: Hunter
Party	Candidate	Votes	%	±%
Labor	Bert James	33,037	71.9	+0.8
Liberal	William Gilchrist	9,044	19.7	+3.0
Democratic Labor	Donald Richards	3,839	8.4	+0.9
Total formal votes		45,920	96.1	
Informal votes		1,856	3.9	
Turnout		47,776	96.2	
Two-party-preferred result
Labor	Bert James		73.6	−4.0
Liberal	William Gilchrist		26.4	+4.0
Labor hold		Swing	−4.0	

==== 1963 ====
1963 Australian federal election: Hunter
Party	Candidate	Votes	%	±%
Labor	Bert James	32,132	71.1	−4.4
Liberal	John Wassell	7,555	16.7	−2.1
Democratic Labor	Aubrey Barr	3,389	7.5	+7.5
Communist	Evan Phillips	2,103	4.7	−1.0
Total formal votes		45,179	97.9	
Informal votes		976	2.1	
Turnout		46,155	96.3	
Two-party-preferred result
Labor	Bert James		77.6	−3.0
Liberal	John Wassell		22.4	+3.0
Labor hold		Swing	−3.0	

==== 1961 ====
1961 Australian federal election: Hunter
Party	Candidate	Votes	%	±%
Labor	Bert James	33,435	75.5	+1.1
Liberal	Edward Farrell	8,337	18.8	+4.7
Communist	John Tapp	2,527	5.7	+5.7
Total formal votes		44,299	98.0	
Informal votes		894	2.0	
Turnout		45,193	96.1	
Two-party-preferred result
Labor	Bert James		80.6	+3.1
Liberal	Edward Farrell		19.4	−3.1
Labor hold		Swing	+3.1	

==== 1960 by-election ====
1960 Hunter by-election
Party	Candidate	Votes	%	±%
Labor	Bert James	21,978	57.0	−17.4
Independent Labor	Bob Brown	11,876	30.8	+30.8
Communist	Charles Dumbrell	3,895	10.1	+10.1
Independent	Keith Murinane	826	2.1	+2.1
Total formal votes		38,575	97.6	
Informal votes		965	2.4	
Turnout		39,540	85.8	
Two-party-preferred result
Labor	Bert James		77.2	−0.3
Independent Labor	Bob Brown		32.8	+32.8
Labor hold		Swing	−0.3	

=== Elections in the 1950s ===
==== 1958 ====
1958 Australian federal election: Hunter
Party	Candidate	Votes	%	±%
Labor	Herbert Evatt	31,740	74.4	+3.6
Liberal	John Marsden	6,036	14.1	−7.2
Democratic Labor	William Burke	4,884	11.4	+11.4
Total formal votes		42,660	97.8	
Informal votes		972	2.2	
Turnout		43,632	96.2	
Two-party-preferred result
Labor	Herbert Evatt		77.5	−0.3
Liberal	John Marsden		22.5	+0.3
Labor hold		Swing	−0.3	

==== 1955 ====
1955 Australian federal election: Hunter
Party	Candidate	Votes	%	±%
Labor	Rowley James	28,766	70.8	+2.0
Liberal	Edward Farrell	8,604	21.3	+1.1
Communist	Evan Phillips	3,158	7.8	+2.6
Total formal votes		40,328	97.4	
Informal votes		1,071	2.6	
Turnout		41,399	95.9	
Two-party-preferred result
Labor	Rowley James		77.8	+1.3
Liberal	Edward Farrell		32.2	−1.3
Labor hold		Swing	+1.3	

==== 1954 ====
1954 Australian federal election: Hunter
Party	Candidate	Votes	%	±%
Labor	Rowley James	29,637	67.1	−3.7
Liberal	Edward Farrell	8,380	19.0	+2.1
Communist	Evan Phillips	2,710	6.1	−1.1
Independent	John McCroarey	2,594	5.9	+5.9
Independent	John White	875	2.0	+2.0
Total formal votes		44,196	98.0	
Informal votes		905	2.0	
Turnout		45,101	96.9	
Two-party-preferred result
Labor	Rowley James		76.5	−2.4
Liberal	Edward Farrell		33.5	+2.4
Labor hold		Swing	−2.4	

==== 1951 ====
1951 Australian federal election: Hunter
Party	Candidate	Votes	%	±%
Labor	Rowley James	28,595	70.8	+2.2
Liberal	Ted Fletcher	6,810	16.9	−4.9
Communist	Evan Phillips	2,927	7.2	−2.4
Independent	Arthur English	2,075	5.1	+5.1
Total formal votes		40,407	97.6	
Informal votes		1,007	2.4	
Turnout		41,414	97.1	
Two-party-preferred result
Labor	Rowley James		78.9	+1.6
Liberal	Ted Fletcher		21.1	−1.6
Labor hold		Swing	+1.6	

=== Elections in the 1940s ===
==== 1949 ====
1949 Australian federal election: Hunter
Party	Candidate	Votes	%	±%
Labor	Rowley James	26,704	68.6	−14.4
Liberal	Ted Fletcher	8,502	21.8	+10.4
Communist	Evan Phillips	3,729	9.6	+9.6
Total formal votes		38,935	97.6	
Informal votes		964	2.4	
Turnout		39,899	97.2	
Two-party-preferred result
Labor	Rowley James		77.3	−9.7
Liberal	Ted Fletcher		32.7	+9.7
Labor hold		Swing	−9.7	

==== 1946 ====
1946 Australian federal election: Hunter
Party	Candidate	Votes	%	±%
Labor	Rowley James	25,366	76.9	−23.1
Liberal	Ted Fletcher	10,208	17.3	+17.3
Lang Labor	John Cain	3,392	5.8	+5.8
Total formal votes		58,966	98.1	
Informal votes		1,119	1.9	
Turnout		60,085	95.8	
Two-party-preferred result
Labor	Rowley James		80.3	−19.7
Liberal	Ted Fletcher		19.7	+19.7
Labor hold		Swing	−19.7	

==== 1943 ====
1943 Australian federal election: Hunter
Party	Candidate	Votes	%	±%
Labor	Rowley James	unopposed		
Labor hold		Swing		

==== 1940 ====
1940 Australian federal election: Hunter
Party	Candidate	Votes	%	±%
Labor	Rowley James	38,921	75.0	−25.0
State Labor	Bill Gollan	12,956	25.0	+25.0
Total formal votes		51,877	97.1	
Informal votes		1,524	2.9	
Turnout		53,401	95.3	
Labor hold		Swing	−25.0	

=== Elections in the 1930s ===
==== 1937 ====
1937 Australian federal election: Hunter
Party	Candidate	Votes	%	±%
Labor	Rowley James	unopposed		
Labor gain from Labor (NSW)		Swing		

==== 1934 ====
1934 Australian federal election: Hunter
Party	Candidate	Votes	%	±%
Labor (NSW)	Rowley James	31,180	65.1	+17.0
Labor	Thomas Ledsam	11,844	24.7	+14.3
Communist	Henry Scanlon	4,904	10.2	+6.3
Total formal votes		47,928	95.7	
Informal votes		2,173	4.3	
Turnout		50,101	96.9	
Two-party-preferred result
Labor (NSW)	Rowley James		74.3	+17.1
Labor	Thomas Ledsam		25.7	+25.7
Labor (NSW) hold		Swing	+17.1	

==== 1931 ====
1931 Australian federal election: Hunter
Party	Candidate	Votes	%	±%
Labor (NSW)	Rowley James	23,194	48.1	+48.1
Independent	Arnold Bailey	18,879	39.2	+39.2
Labor	Allan Howie	4,213	8.7	−91.3
Communist	Harris Burnham	1,891	3.9	+3.9
Total formal votes		48,177	96.0	
Informal votes		2,008	4.0	
Turnout		50,185	96.4	
Two-party-preferred result
Labor (NSW)	Rowley James		57.2	+57.2
Independent	Arnold Bailey		42.8	+42.8
Labor (NSW) gain from Labor		Swing	+57.2	

=== Elections in the 1920s ===
==== 1929 ====
1929 Australian federal election: Hunter
Party	Candidate	Votes	%	±%
Labor	Rowley James	unopposed		
Labor hold		Swing		

==== 1928 ====
1928 Australian federal election: Hunter
Party	Candidate	Votes	%	±%
Labor	Rowley James	28,331	62.2	−9.1
Nationalist	Ernest Carr	9,145	20.1	−8.6
Independent Labor	Jim Brown	8,073	17.7	+17.7
Total formal votes		45,549	94.5	
Informal votes		2,640	5.5	
Turnout		48,189	95.5	
Two-party-preferred result
Labor	Rowley James		70.6	−0.7
Nationalist	Ernest Carr		39.4	+0.7
Labor hold		Swing	−0.7	

==== 1925 ====
1925 Australian federal election: Hunter
Party	Candidate	Votes	%	±%
Labor	Matthew Charlton	31,244	71.3	−28.7
Nationalist	Alfred Horsfall	12,550	28.7	+28.7
Total formal votes		43,794	98.2	
Informal votes		791	1.8	
Turnout		44,585	92.2	
Labor hold		Swing	−28.7	

==== 1922 ====
1922 Australian federal election: Hunter
Party	Candidate	Votes	%	±%
Labor	Matthew Charlton	unopposed		
Labor hold		Swing		

=== Elections in the 1910s ===
==== 1919 ====
1919 Australian federal election: Hunter
Party	Candidate	Votes	%	±%
Labor	Matthew Charlton	13,692	58.9	+5.5
Nationalist	John Lee	9,558	41.1	−5.5
Total formal votes		23,250	98.0	
Informal votes		485	2.0	
Turnout		23,735	60.9	
Labor hold		Swing	+5.5	

==== 1917 ====
1917 Australian federal election: Hunter
Party	Candidate	Votes	%	±%
Labor	Matthew Charlton	13,327	53.4	−1.2
Nationalist	William Ferguson	11,633	46.6	+1.2
Total formal votes		24,960	97.7	
Informal votes		585	2.3	
Turnout		25,545	67.8	
Labor hold		Swing	−1.2	

==== 1914 ====
1914 Australian federal election: Hunter
Party	Candidate	Votes	%	±%
Labor	Matthew Charlton	12,057	54.6	+0.1
Liberal	Alexander Hay	10,045	45.4	−0.1
Total formal votes		22,102	98.1	
Informal votes		429	1.9	
Turnout		22,531	61.5	
Labor hold		Swing	+0.1	

==== 1913 ====
1913 Australian federal election: Hunter
Party	Candidate	Votes	%	±%
Labor	Matthew Charlton	12,884	54.5	−2.4
Liberal	John Fegan	10,763	45.5	+2.4
Total formal votes		23,647	98.1	
Informal votes		462	1.9	
Turnout		24,109	67.2	
Labor hold		Swing	−2.4	

==== 1910 ====
1910 Australian federal election: Hunter
Party	Candidate	Votes	%	±%
Labour	Matthew Charlton	14,803	60.9	+11.7
Liberal	Frank Liddell	9,523	39.1	−11.7
Total formal votes		24,326	98.5	
Informal votes		373	1.5	
Turnout		24,699	69.3	
Labour gain from Liberal		Swing	+11.7	

=== Elections in the 1900s ===
==== 1906 ====
1906 Australian federal election: Hunter
Party	Candidate	Votes	%	±%
Anti-Socialist	Frank Liddell	6,843	50.8	−8.5
Labour	William Kearsley	6,617	49.2	+41.2
Total formal votes		13,460	97.7	
Informal votes		314	2.3	
Turnout		13,774	51.4	
Anti-Socialist hold		Swing	−12.5	

==== 1903 ====
1903 Australian federal election: Hunter
Party	Candidate	Votes	%	±%
Free Trade	Frank Liddell	7,697	59.3	+59.3
Ind. Protectionist	James Waller	4,241	32.7	+32.7
Labour	Arthur Rae	1,044	8.0	+8.0
Total formal votes		12,982	98.1	
Informal votes		256	1.9	
Turnout		13,238	49.1	
Free Trade gain from Protectionist		Swing	+59.3	

==== 1901 ====
1901 Australian federal election: Hunter
Party	Candidate	Votes	%	±%
Protectionist	Edmund Barton	unopposed		
Protectionist win		(new seat)		
