= Electoral results for the Division of Charlton =

Australian division election results

This is a list of electoral results for the Division of Charlton in Australian federal elections since the division's creation in 1984 until its abolition in 2016.

== Members ==
Member	Party	Term
Bob Brown	Labor	1984–1998
Kelly Hoare	Labor	1998–2007
Greg Combet	Labor	2007–2013
Pat Conroy	Labor	2013–2016

== Election results ==
=== Elections in the 2010s ===
==== 2013 ====
2013 Australian federal election: Charlton
Party	Candidate	Votes	%	±%
Labor	Pat Conroy	40,125	46.44	−6.71
Liberal	Kevin Baker	24,646	28.53	−2.18
Palmer United	Bronwyn Reid	9,412	10.89	+10.89
Greens	Dessie Kocher	5,820	6.74	−2.09
Christian Democrats	Steve Camilleri	2,671	3.09	+0.27
One Nation	Brian Burston	2,266	2.62	+2.62
Bullet Train	Trevor Anthoney	1,460	1.69	+1.69
Total formal votes		86,400	92.89	−0.19
Informal votes		6,618	7.11	+0.19
Turnout		93,018	94.40	−0.08
Two-party-preferred result
Labor	Pat Conroy	51,173	59.23	−3.44
Liberal	Kevin Baker	35,227	40.77	+3.44
Labor hold		Swing	−3.44	

==== 2010 ====
2010 Australian federal election: Charlton
Party	Candidate	Votes	%	±%
Labor	Greg Combet	44,159	53.15	+0.09
Liberal	John McDonald	25,514	30.71	−0.89
Greens	Ian McKenzie	7,339	8.83	+0.75
Independent	Patrick Barry	2,846	3.43	+1.94
Christian Democrats	Mitchell Pickstone	2,341	2.82	+0.42
Citizens Electoral Council	Ann Lawler	881	1.06	+0.71
Total formal votes		83,080	93.08	−2.25
Informal votes		6,176	6.92	+2.25
Turnout		89,256	94.47	−1.53
Two-party-preferred result
Labor	Greg Combet	52,064	62.67	−0.24
Liberal	John McDonald	31,016	37.33	+0.24
Labor hold		Swing	−0.24	

=== Elections in the 2000s ===
==== 2007 ====
2007 Australian federal election: Charlton
Party	Candidate	Votes	%	±%
Labor	Greg Combet	44,156	53.08	+6.47
Liberal	Lindsay Paterson	26,353	31.68	−3.49
Greens	Suzanne Pritchard	6,708	8.06	−0.71
Independent	Stuart Ulrich	2,008	2.41	+2.41
Christian Democrats	Jim Kendall	2,007	2.41	+2.41
Independent	Patrick Barry	1,253	1.51	+1.51
Socialist Equality	Terry Cook	404	0.49	+0.49
Citizens Electoral Council	David Stow	294	0.35	−0.23
Total formal votes		83,183	95.34	+0.46
Informal votes		4,066	4.66	−0.46
Turnout		87,249	95.74	+0.14
Two-party-preferred result
Labor	Greg Combet	52,298	62.87	+4.47
Liberal	Lindsay Paterson	30,885	37.13	−4.47
Labor hold		Swing	+4.47	

==== 2004 ====
2004 Australian federal election: Charlton
Party	Candidate	Votes	%	±%
Labor	Kelly Hoare	35,765	45.95	−0.11
Liberal	Kurt Darcey	27,480	35.31	+2.00
Greens	Suzanne Pritchard	6,964	8.95	+4.01
Family First	Paul Scarfe	3,317	4.26	+4.26
One Nation	Bob Johnson	2,416	3.10	−4.63
Democrats	Ben Roffey	1,513	1.94	−3.13
Citizens Electoral Council	David Stow	380	0.49	+0.49
Total formal votes		77,835	95.04	−0.38
Informal votes		4,059	4.96	+0.38
Turnout		81,894	95.73	+0.10
Two-party-preferred result
Labor	Kelly Hoare	45,084	57.92	+1.26
Liberal	Kurt Darcey	32,751	42.08	−1.26
Labor hold		Swing	+1.26	

==== 2001 ====
2001 Australian federal election: Charlton
Party	Candidate	Votes	%	±%
Labor	Kelly Hoare	35,079	46.06	−2.53
Liberal	Lindsay Paterson	25,371	33.31	+5.07
One Nation	Bob Johnson	5,884	7.73	−4.28
Democrats	Joshua Bell	3,865	5.07	+0.44
Greens	David Blyth	3,765	4.94	+1.63
Christian Democrats	Jim Kendall	1,859	2.44	−0.62
Unity	John Thorpe	339	0.45	+0.45
Total formal votes		76,162	95.43	−1.58
Informal votes		3,651	4.57	+1.58
Turnout		79,813	96.04	
Two-party-preferred result
Labor	Kelly Hoare	43,151	56.66	−5.54
Liberal	Lindsay Paterson	33,011	43.34	+5.54
Labor hold		Swing	−5.54	

=== Elections in the 1990s ===
==== 1998 ====
1998 Australian federal election: Charlton
Party	Candidate	Votes	%	±%
Labor	Kelly Hoare	39,604	49.32	−0.68
Liberal	Bruce Gatgens	22,175	27.61	−5.86
One Nation	Pamela Young	9,664	12.03	+12.03
Democrats	Stephen Bisgrove	3,689	4.59	−3.80
Greens	Nathan Ross	2,679	3.34	−1.66
Christian Democrats	Ralph Gourlay	2,494	3.11	+3.11
Total formal votes		80,305	96.97	+0.42
Informal votes		2,513	3.03	−0.42
Turnout		82,818	96.20	−1.14
Two-party-preferred result
Labor	Kelly Hoare	50,570	62.97	+3.65
Liberal	Bruce Gatgens	29,735	37.03	−3.65
Labor hold		Swing	+3.65	

==== 1996 ====
1996 Australian federal election: Charlton
Party	Candidate	Votes	%	±%
Labor	Bob Brown	38,665	50.00	−10.91
Liberal	Peter Craig	25,884	33.47	+6.64
Democrats	Lyn Godfrey	6,494	8.40	+2.98
Greens	Bernadette Brugman	3,863	5.00	+5.00
Against Further Immigration	Ron Franks	2,428	3.14	+3.14
Total formal votes		77,334	96.55	−0.22
Informal votes		2,767	3.45	+0.22
Turnout		80,101	97.34	+0.11
Two-party-preferred result
Labor	Bob Brown	45,646	59.32	−7.78
Liberal	Peter Craig	31,298	40.68	+7.78
Labor hold		Swing	−7.78	

==== 1993 ====
1993 Australian federal election: Charlton
Party	Candidate	Votes	%	±%
Labor	Bob Brown	44,680	60.90	+8.33
Liberal	Laurence Brewster	19,681	26.83	+6.18
Democrats	Lyn Godfrey	3,976	5.42	−7.97
Independent	John Baldwin	2,216	3.02	+3.02
Call to Australia	Mick Sandford	1,273	1.74	+1.74
Independent	Ryan Wilson	780	1.06	+1.06
Independent	Charles Sievers	516	0.70	+0.70
Natural Law	Zdenek Kviz	239	0.33	+0.33
Total formal votes		73,361	96.77	−0.76
Informal votes		2,449	3.23	+0.76
Turnout		75,810	97.23	
Two-party-preferred result
Labor	Bob Brown	49,215	67.10	+2.09
Liberal	Laurence Brewster	24,127	32.90	−2.09
Labor hold		Swing	+2.09	

==== 1990 ====
1990 Australian federal election: Charlton
Party	Candidate	Votes	%	±%
Labor	Bob Brown	36,750	54.4	−3.3
Liberal	Mollie Blake	13,950	20.7	−6.6
Democrats	Lyn Godfrey	9,299	13.8	+2.2
Independent	Geoff Pendlebury	7,510	11.1	+11.1
Total formal votes		67,509	97.6	
Informal votes		1,650	2.4	
Turnout		69,159	96.1	
Two-party-preferred result
Labor	Bob Brown	44,224	65.7	−1.2
Liberal	Mollie Blake	23,115	34.3	+1.2
Labor hold		Swing	−1.2	

=== Elections in the 1980s ===
==== 1987 ====
1987 Australian federal election: Charlton
Party	Candidate	Votes	%	±%
Labor	Bob Brown	36,113	57.7	−4.6
Liberal	Mollie Blake	17,084	27.3	−0.1
Democrats	Lyn Godfrey	7,252	11.6	+1.3
Independent	Vishnu Chaudhary	2,110	3.4	+3.4
Total formal votes		62,559	95.8	
Informal votes		2,760	4.2	
Turnout		65,319	95.4	
Two-party-preferred result
Labor	Bob Brown	41,830	66.9	−0.4
Liberal	Mollie Blake	20,729	33.1	+0.4
Labor hold		Swing	−0.4	

==== 1984 ====
1984 Australian federal election: Charlton
Party	Candidate	Votes	%	±%
Labor	Bob Brown	36,860	62.3	−4.2
Liberal	Don Harris	16,216	27.4	+3.4
Democrats	Lyn Godfrey	6,105	10.3	+2.2
Total formal votes		59,181	94.0	
Informal votes		3,750	6.0	
Turnout		62,931	95.4	
Two-party-preferred result
Labor	Bob Brown	39,827	67.3	−3.2
Liberal	Don Harris	19,354	32.7	+3.2
Labor notional hold		Swing	−3.2	
