= 1960 Hunter by-election =

A by-election was held for the Australian House of Representatives seat of Hunter on 9 April 1960. This was triggered by the resignation of Labor MP and former Opposition Leader H. V. Evatt. A by-election for the seat of La Trobe was held on the same day.

The seat was won by Labor candidate Bert James, the son of Evatt's predecessor Rowley James. The governing Liberal Party did not field a candidate, leaving as James' main opposition independent labor candidate Bob Brown, a shop-keeper and councillor on Cessnock City Council. He was apparently not related to the Bob Brown, who would win the seat as the endorsed Labor candidate twenty years later.

== Results ==
Hunter by-election, 1960
Party	Candidate	Votes	%	±%
Labor	Bert James	21,978	57.0	−17.4
Independent Labor	Bob Brown	11,876	30.8	+30.8
Communist	Charles Dumbrell	3,895	10.1	+10.1
Independent	Keith Murinane	826	2.1	+2.1
Total formal votes		38,575	97.6	
Informal votes		965	2.4	
Turnout		39,540	85.8	
Two-party-preferred result
Labor	Bert James		77.2	−0.3
Independent Labor	Bob Brown		32.8	+32.8
Labor hold		Swing	−0.3	
