= Lachlan Fitzgibbon =

Australian rugby league footballer (born 1994)

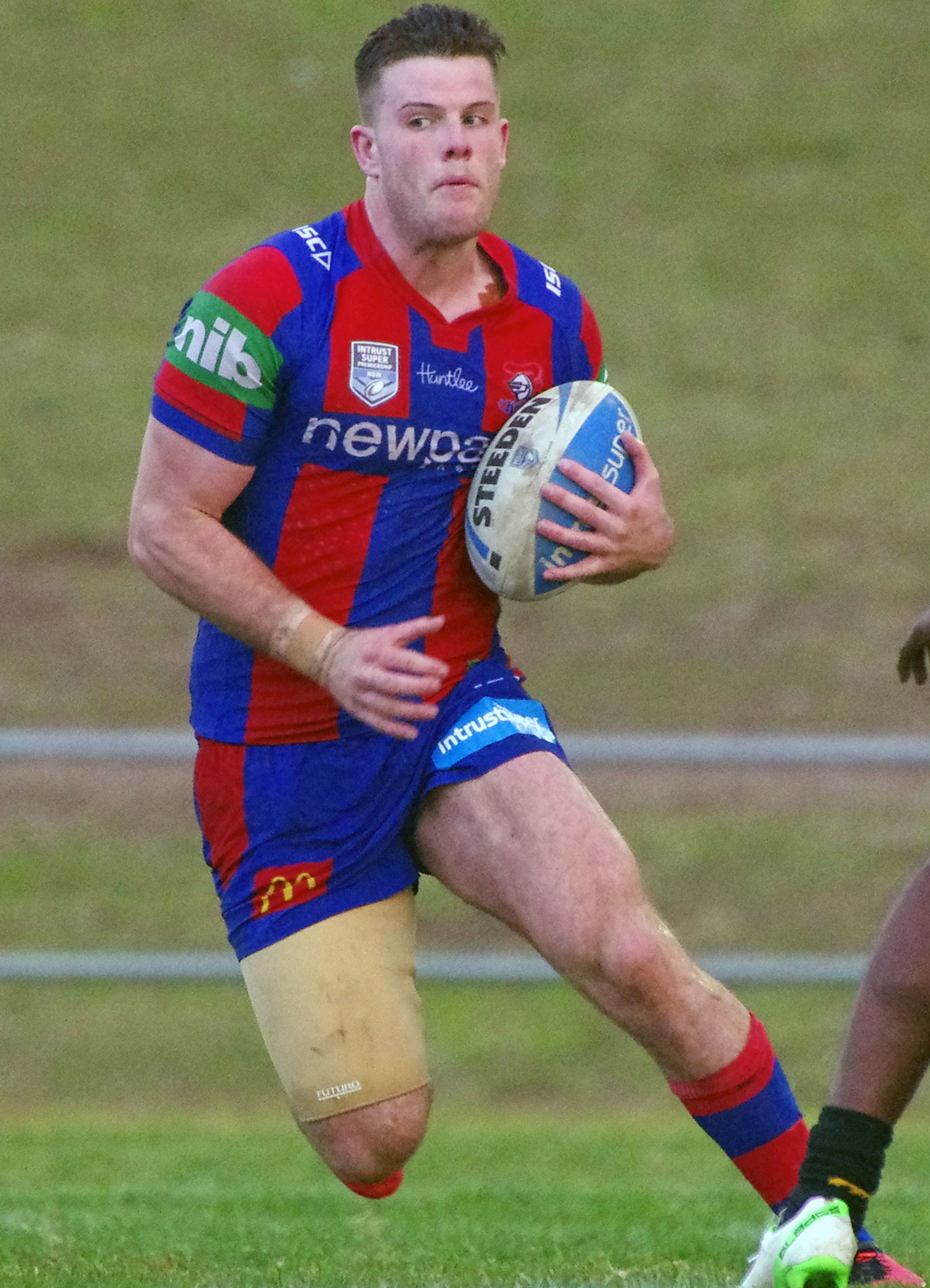
- Fitzgibbon in 2016

Personal information
- Born: 5 January 1994 (age 32) North Sydney, New South Wales, Australia
- Height: 192 cm (6 ft 4 in)
- Weight: 107 kg (16 st 12 lb)

Playing information
- Position: Second-row
Club
Years	Team	Pld	T	G	FG	P
2015–23	Newcastle Knights	119	32	0	0	128
2024–25	Warrington Wolves	41	2	0	0	8
	Total	160	34	0	0	136
- Source: As of 14 March 2025
- Relatives: Joel Fitzgibbon (uncle); Eric Fitzgibbon (grandfather)

Lachlan Fitzgibbon (born 5 January 1994) is an Australian professional rugby league footballer who plays as second-row forward for the South Newcastle Lions in the Newcastle Rugby League. He previously played for the Newcastle Knights in the NRL and Warrington Wolves in the Super League.

== Background ==
Fitzgibbon was born in North Sydney, New South Wales, Australia and moved to Newcastle at a young age.

He played his junior rugby league for the South Newcastle Lions in the Newcastle Rugby League. He was then signed by the Newcastle Knights.

Fitzgibbon is the son of nib CEO Mark Fitzgibbon and nephew of Australian Labor Party MP Joel Fitzgibbon. Lachlan's grandfather is Eric Fitzgibbon who was an MP for the electorate of Hunter.

== Playing career ==
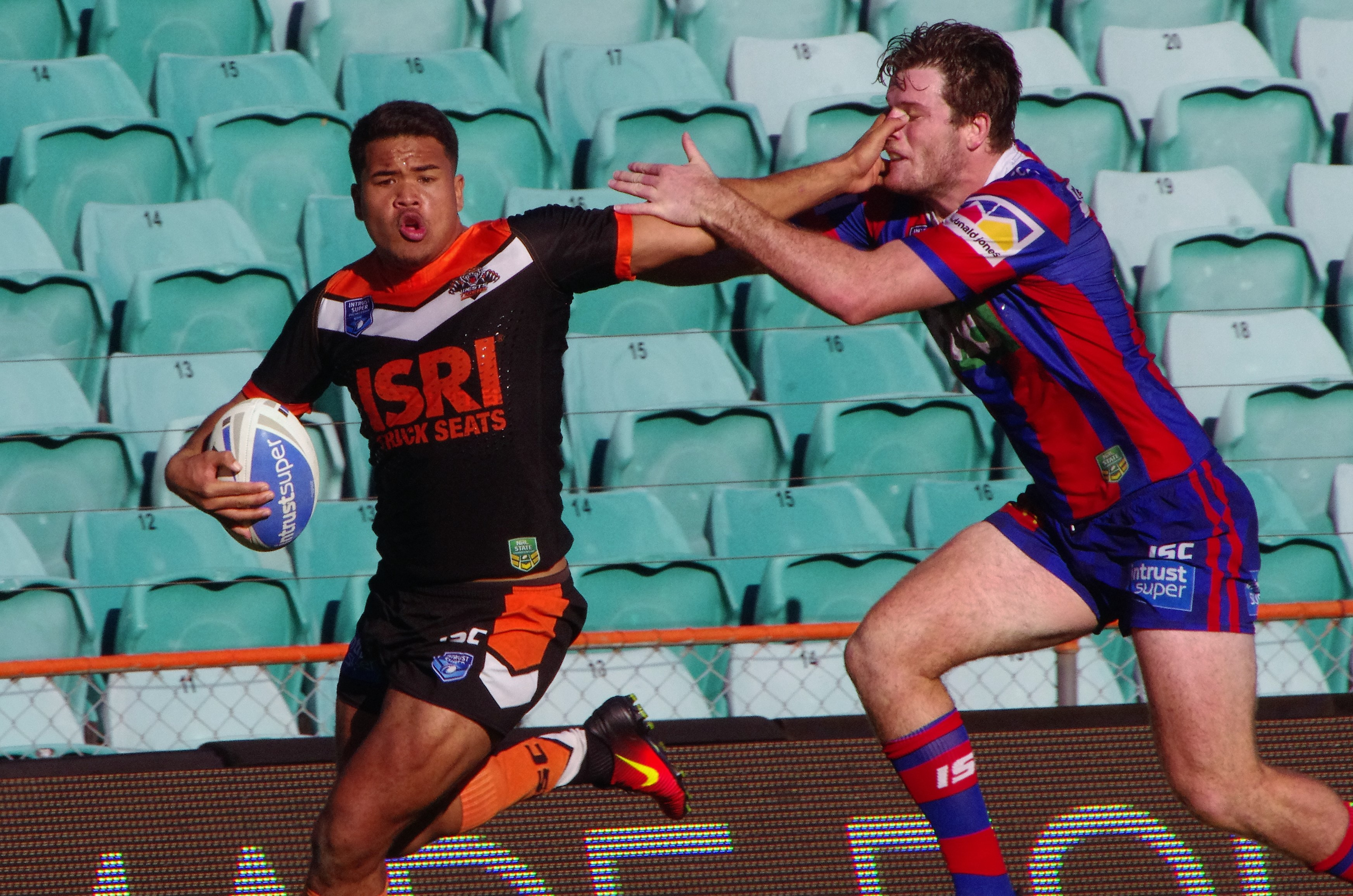
Fitzgibbon attempting to tackle Esan Marsters of the Wests Tigers in 2017

=== Early career ===
In 2013 and 2014, Fitzgibbon played for the Newcastle Knights' NYC team.

=== 2015 ===
In 2015, Fitzgibbon moved on to the Knights' New South Wales Cup team. In round 21 of the 2015 NRL season, he made his NRL debut for the Knights against the St. George Illawarra Dragons. This would be Fitzgibbon's only appearance for the first grade team in the 2015 NRL season as the club finished last on the table.

In August, Fitzgibbon re-signed with the Newcastle club on a two-year contract.

On 27 September, he played in the Knights' 2015 New South Wales Cup Grand Final win over the Wyong Roos at Parramatta Stadium.

=== 2016 ===
Fitzgibbon made five appearances for Newcastle in the 2016 NRL season as the club finished last for a second consecutive year. He scored his first try in the top grade against North Queensland in round 13 of the competition.

=== 2017 ===
Fitzgibbon made his first NRL appearance of the 2017 NRL season in round 10, going on to play in 14 matches and scoring 8 tries as the club finished last for a third straight season. In September, he re-signed with Newcastle on a two-year contract until the end of 2019.

=== 2018 ===
Fitzgibbon made 21 appearances and scored nine tries for Newcastle in the 2018 NRL season as the club finished 11th on the table.

=== 2019 ===
Fitzgibbon played 21 games and scored five tries for Newcastle in the 2019 NRL season as the club finished a disappointing 11th on the table. At the start of the year, many tipped Newcastle to reach the finals after the club recruited heavily in the off-season.

=== 2020 ===
He made 17 appearances for Newcastle in the 2020 NRL season including the club's first finals game since 2013 which was an elimination finals loss against South Sydney.

=== 2021 ===
Fitzgibbon only 10 games for Newcastle in the 2021 NRL season and did not play in the club's elimination finals loss against Parramatta.

=== 2022 ===
Fitzgibbon was limited to only nine appearances for Newcastle in the 2022 NRL season as the club finished 14th on the table.

=== 2023 ===
Fitzgibbon made his 100th NRL appearance in March 2023 scoring a try for Newcastle in their 14–12 win over the Wests Tigers. In July, Fitzgibbon signed a three-year contract with Super League side Warrington Wolves, starting in 2024.

=== 2024 ===
On 8 June, Fitzgibbon played in Warrington's 2024 Challenge Cup final defeat against Wigan. Fitzgibbon played 14 matches for Warrington in the 2024 Super League season as the club reached the semi-final before losing to Hull Kingston Rovers.

=== 2025 ===
On 7 June 2025, Fitzgibbon played in Warrington's 8-6 Challenge Cup final loss against Hull Kingston Rovers. Fitzgibbon played 24 games for Warrington in the 2025 Super League season as they missed the playoffs finishing 8th on the table.

=== 2026 ===
Fitzgibbon following his release from Warrington, signed a deal with the South Newcastle Lions for the 2026 season.

== Statistics ==
Year	Team	Games	Tries	Pts
2015	Newcastle Knights	1	0	0
2016	Newcastle Knights	5	1	4
2017	Newcastle Knights	14	8	32
2018	Newcastle Knights	21	9	36
2019	Newcastle Knights	21	5	20
2020	Newcastle Knights	17	1	4
2021	Newcastle Knights	10	3	12
2022	Newcastle Knights	9	0	0
2023	Newcastle Knights	18	5	20
2024	Warrington Wolves	17	1	4
2025	Warrington Wolves	24	1	4
	Totals	160	34	136

*denotes season competing
