= Shooting at the 2014 Commonwealth Games – Men's 50 metre pistol =

2014 event

Shooting – Men's 50 metre air pistol at the 2014 Commonwealth Games
- Venue: Barry Buddon Shooting Centre
- Dates: 28 July 2014
- Competitors: 24 from 13 nations

Medalists
| gold medal | Jitu Rai | India |
| silver medal | Gurpal Singh | India |
| bronze medal | Daniel Repacholi | Australia |

The qualification round of Men's 50 metre pistol event started on the morning of 28 July 2014 at the Barry Buddon Shooting Centre, while the final was held in the evening at the same place. The qualification round was topped by Indian Shooter Jitu Rai, which was also a Commonwealth Games Record.

== Results ==
=== Qualification ===
| Rank | Name | Country | 1 | 2 | 3 | 4 | 5 | 6 | Final | Total |
|---|---|---|---|---|---|---|---|---|---|---|
| 1 | Jitu Rai | India | 93 | 94 | 93 | 95 | 91 | 96 | 562 | Q, GR |
| 2 | Kristian Callaghan | England | 91 | 90 | 94 | 90 | 92 | 90 | 547 | Q |
| 3 | Roger Daniel | Trinidad and Tobago | 90 | 90 | 89 | 92 | 92 | 92 | 545 | Q |
| 4 | Daniel Repacholi | Australia | 86 | 91 | 90 | 95 | 90 | 91 | 543 | Q |
| 5 | Bin Gai | Singapore | 94 | 90 | 90 | 94 | 89 | 84 | 541 | Q |
| 6 | Gurpal Singh | India | 89 | 90 | 91 | 90 | 90 | 88 | 538 | Q |
| 7 | Lip Meng Poh | Singapore | 84 | 92 | 86 | 93 | 87 | 93 | 535 | Q |
| 8 | Bruce Quick | Australia | 88 | 89 | 89 | 91 | 88 | 90 | 535 | Q |
| 9 | Eddy Chew | Malaysia | 90 | 89 | 92 | 85 | 89 | 89 | 534 | |
| 10 | Choo Wen Yan | Malaysia | 86 | 88 | 92 | 88 | 90 | 90 | 534 | |
| 11 | Uzair Ahmed | Pakistan | 88 | 88 | 95 | 89 | 88 | 85 | 533 | |
| 12 | Muhammad Shehzad Akhtar | Pakistan | 83 | 90 | 91 | 92 | 88 | 86 | 530 | |
| 13 | Mick Gault | England | 84 | 89 | 89 | 87 | 88 | 92 | 529 | |
| 14 | Mark Hynes | Canada | 87 | 85 | 89 | 88 | 88 | 90 | 527 | |
| 15 | Alan Ritchie | Scotland | 91 | 90 | 88 | 85 | 86 | 86 | 526 | |
| 16 | Alan Goodall | Scotland | 91 | 89 | 90 | 77 | 88 | 91 | 526 | |
| 17 | Ricky Zhao | New Zealand | 85 | 81 | 84 | 89 | 85 | 81 | 505 | |
| 18 | Rhodney Allen | Trinidad and Tobago | 90 | 85 | 93 | 75 | 87 | 71 | 501 | |
| 19 | Shitul Shah | Kenya | 84 | 78 | 82 | 82 | 83 | 84 | 493 | |
| 20 | Bernard Chase | Barbados | 79 | 87 | 84 | 82 | 85 | 74 | 491 | |
| 21 | Ronald Livingstone Sargeant | Barbados | 79 | 80 | 79 | 83 | 79 | 79 | 479 | |
| 22 | Shaminderpal Singh Madhar | Kenya | 87 | 83 | 74 | 80 | 77 | 77 | 478 | |
| 23 | Douglas Creek | Norfolk Island | 77 | 72 | 83 | 73 | 84 | 75 | 464 | |
| 24 | Kevin Coulter | Norfolk Island | 66 | 79 | 69 | 63 | 60 | 59 | 396 | |

=== Final ===
| Rank | Name | Country | 1 | 2 | 3 | 4 | 5 | 6 | 7 | 8 | 9 | Final | Notes |
|---|---|---|---|---|---|---|---|---|---|---|---|---|---|
| 1st place, gold medalist(s) | Jitu Rai | India | 29.5 | 28.2 | 20.2 | 19.9 | 20.5 | 18.6 | 18.3 | 18.9 | 20 | 194.1 | FGR |
| 2nd place, silver medalist(s) | Gurpal Singh | India | 26.7 | 27.6 | 19.3 | 19.6 | 19.1 | 17.2 | 18.2 | 19.3 | 20.2 | 187.2 | |
| 3rd place, bronze medalist(s) | Daniel Repacholi | Australia | 29.9 | 25.8 | 18.7 | 16.7 | 19.9 | 18.8 | 17.4 | 19.4 | − | 166.6 | |
| 4 | Bin Gai | Singapore | 25.6 | 29.4 | 18.2 | 19.3 | 18.6 | 17.5 | 14.8 | − | − | 143.4 | |
| 5 | Kristian Callaghan | England | 30 | 27.3 | 16.9 | 19.5 | 15.5 | 18.8 | − | − | − | 128 | |
| 6 | Lip Meng Poh | Singapore | 26.3 | 29.3 | 15.6 | 20 | 17.1 | − | − | − | − | 108.3 | |
| 7 | Roger Daniel | Trinidad and Tobago | 25.5 | 27.7 | 18.2 | 19.1 | − | − | − | − | − | 90.5 | |
| 8 | Bruce Quick | Australia | 28.5 | 22.6 | 17.7 | − | − | − | − | − | − | 68.8 | |
