= Gurpal Singh =

Indian sport shooter (born 1980)

Personal information
- Nationality: Indian
- Born: 13 June 1980 (age 46) Bathinda, Punjab, India

Sport
- Country: India
- Sport: Shooting
- Event: 50 m pistol
Medal record
Men's shooting
Representing India
Commonwealth Games
| Silver medal – second place | 2014 Glasgow | 50 m pistol |

Gurpal Singh (born 13 June 1980) is an Indian shooter who won the silver medal at the 2014 Commonwealth Games in the 50 m pistol event.
