= Frank Liddell (politician) =

Australian politician

Dr Frank Liddell
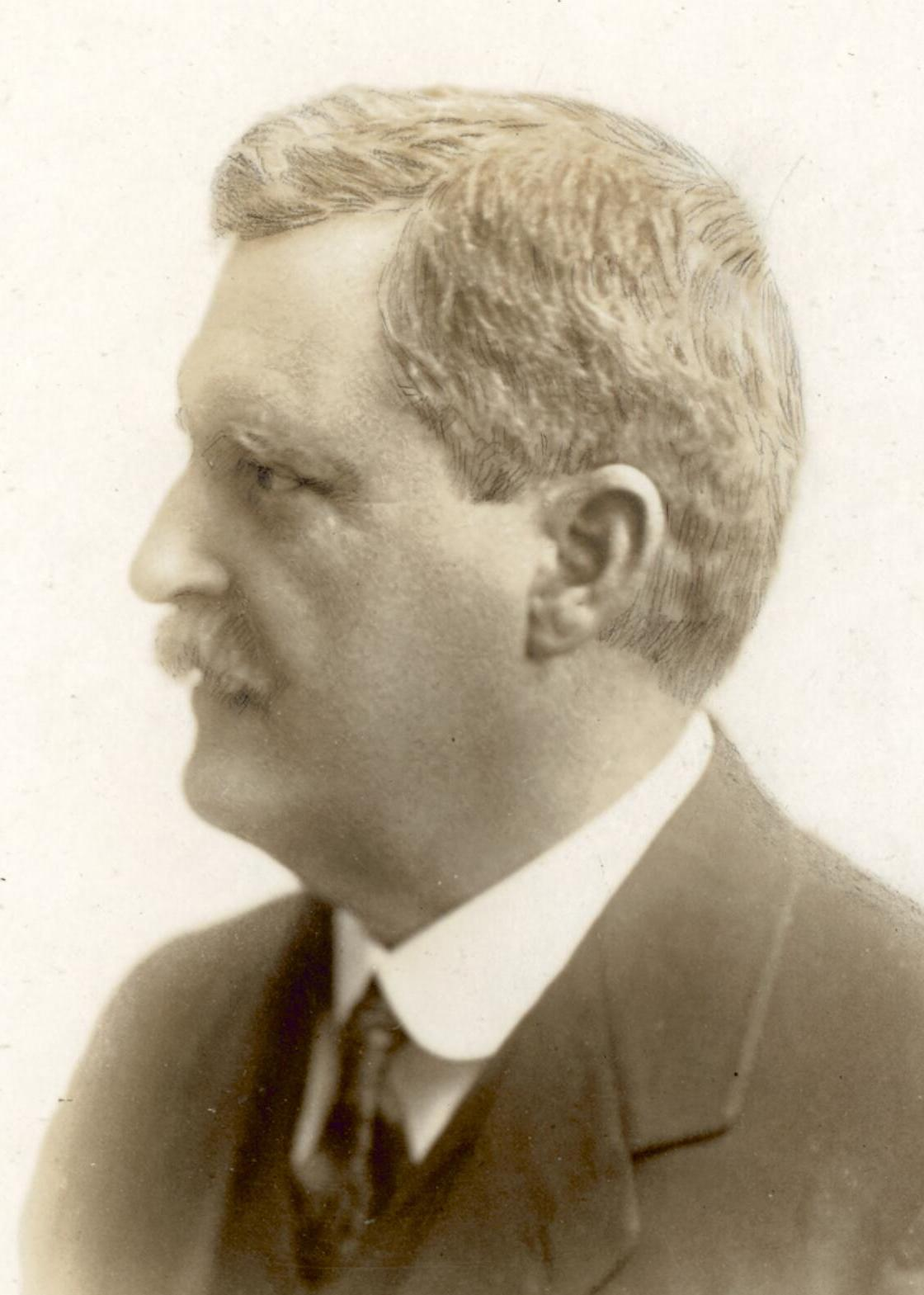

Member of the Australian Parliament for Hunter
- In office 16 December 1903 – 13 April 1910
- Preceded by: Edmund Barton
- Succeeded by: Matthew Charlton

Personal details
- Born: 26 June 1862 Maitland, New South Wales
- Died: 20 October 1939 (aged 77)
- Party: Free Trade (1903–06); Anti-Socialist (1906–09); Liberal (1909–10)
- Education: University of Edinburgh
- Occupation: Doctor

Frank Liddell (26 June 1862 – 20 October 1939) was an Australian politician. Born in Maitland, New South Wales, he was educated at Sydney Grammar School and subsequently attended the University of Edinburgh. He returned as a doctor to Maitland, and was elected to West Maitland Council. In 1903, he was elected to the Australian House of Representatives as the Free Trade Party member for Hunter, succeeding Prime Minister Edmund Barton, who had retired. He held the seat until 1910, when he was defeated by future Labor leader Matthew Charlton. Liddell subsequently retired from politics and returned to medicine, practicing in Maitland and Hornsby. He died in 1939.

Parliament of Australia
Preceded by Edmund Barton	Member for Hunter; 1903 – 1910	Succeeded by Matthew Charlton
