= Kelly Hoare =

Australian politician (1963–2024)

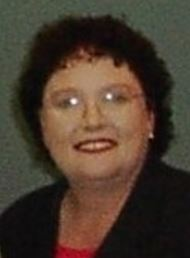
- Hoare in 2005

Member of the Australian Parliament for Charlton
- In office 3 October 1998 – 17 October 2007
- Preceded by: Bob Brown
- Succeeded by: Greg Combet

Personal details
- Born: 1 July 1963 Deniliquin, New South Wales, Australia
- Died: 21 March 2024 (aged 60)
- Party: Labor
- Relations: Bob Brown (father)
- Education: University of Canberra
- Occupation: Politician

Kelly Joy Hoare (née Brown; 1 July 1963 – 21 March 2024) was an Australian politician. She was a member of the House of Representatives from 1998 to 2007, representing the New South Wales seat of Charlton for the Australian Labor Party (ALP). She succeeded her father Bob Brown in federal parliament.

== Early life ==
Hoare was born on 1 July 1963 in Deniliquin, New South Wales. She was one of two children born to Elizabeth Joy (née Hirschausen) and Robert James Brown. Her father, a school principal, was elected to state parliament in 1978 and to federal parliament in 1980, becoming a federal government minister. She was also a distant descendant of Henry Turner, one of the founders of the ALP.

Hoare completed a Bachelor of Arts at the University of Canberra. She was a public servant before entering politics, working as an auditor in the Department of Defence and later in the employment department where she was responsible for unemployed people with special needs. She then worked as an electorate officer for her father.

== Politics ==
Hoare was elected to the House of Representatives at the 1998 federal election, succeeding her father in the seat of Charlton. She was re-elected at the 2001 and 2004 elections. She is the first woman to follow her father into federal parliament.

In 2003, Hoare was described as the "only Caucus member from New South Wales not factionally aligned", although she opposed Kim Beazley returning to the party's leadership. She was a public opponent of the proposed Anvil Hill Coal Mine.

Prior to the 2007 federal election, Hoare was successfully challenged for ALP preselection by high-profile trade unionist Greg Combet. Her removal as the endorsed candidate was acrimonious. She publicly threatened to sue the ALP for unfair dismissal, and she stated that her removal would lead to her family losing its house as she was the sole breadwinner. After being replaced by Combet, allegations of sexual misconduct against Hoare were leaked to the Murdoch media. In her final speech to parliament in June 2007, she stated she was "disgusted by the vile way in which I have been treated by people from whom I should have been able to expect greater decency, loyalty and support" and that there was "nothing voluntary about my departure from this parliament".

== Personal life ==
Hoare and her husband had two children. In May 2007 she publicly stated she was undergoing counselling after she "allegedly demanded sex from a government driver". She died on 21 March 2024.

Parliament of Australia
Preceded by Bob Brown	Member for Charlton; 1998–2007	Succeeded by Greg Combet
