= Matthew Charlton =

Australian politician

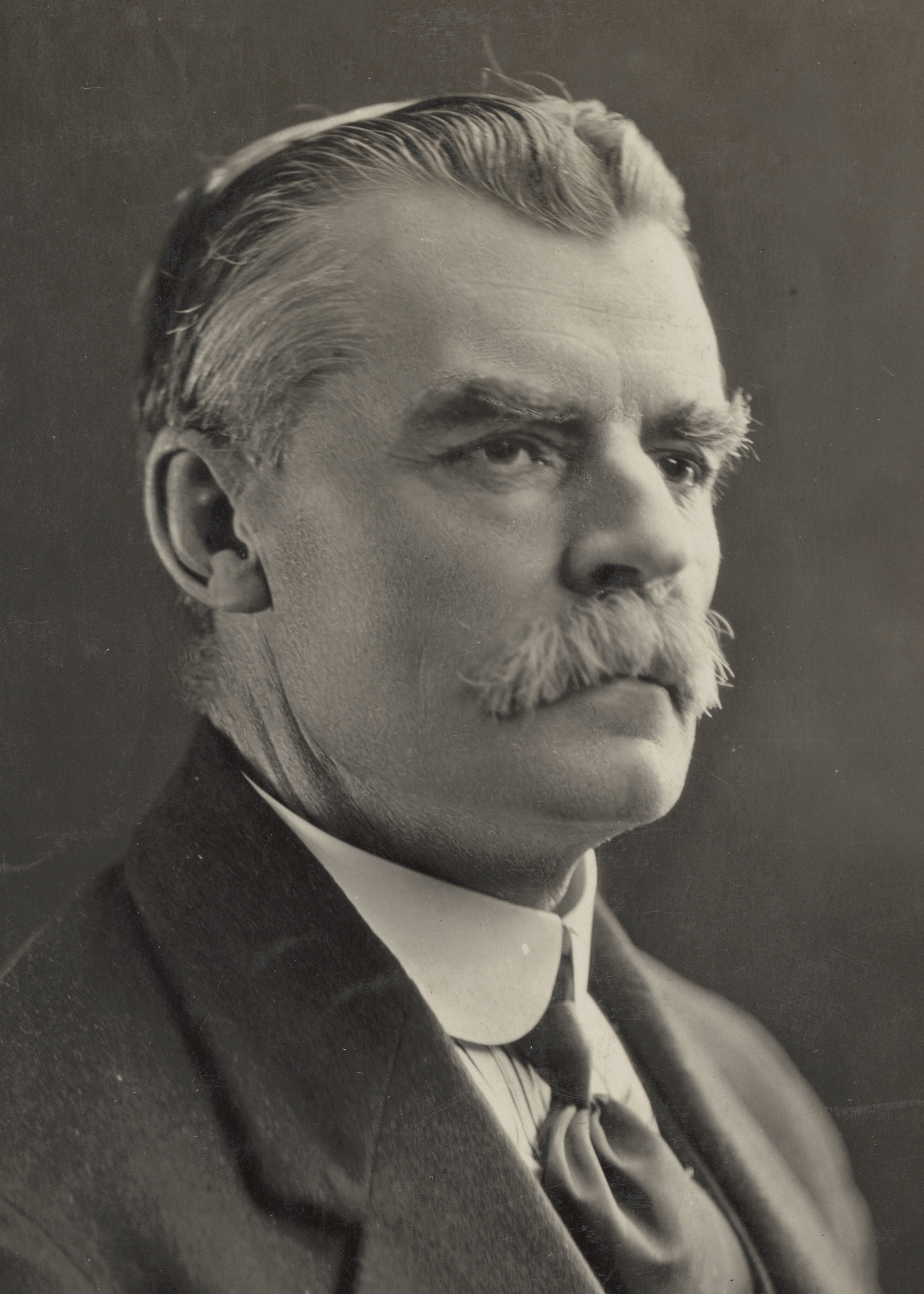

Leader of the Opposition
- In office 25 January 1922 – 29 March 1928
- Prime Minister: Billy Hughes; Stanley Bruce
- Deputy: Albert Gardiner; James Scullin
- Preceded by: Frank Tudor
- Succeeded by: James Scullin

Leader of the Labor Party
- In office 16 May 1922 – 29 March 1928; Acting leader: 5 January – 16 May 1922
- Deputy: Albert Gardiner; James Scullin
- Preceded by: Frank Tudor
- Succeeded by: James Scullin

Assistant Leader of the Labor Party
- In office 30 September 1921 – 16 May 1922
- Leader: Frank Tudor
- Preceded by: T. J. Ryan
- Succeeded by: Frank Anstey
Electorate
Member of the Australian Parliament for Hunter
In office 13 April 1910 – 9 October 1928
Preceded by	Frank Liddell
Succeeded by	Rowley James
State Parliament
Member of the New South Wales Legislative Assembly for Northumberland
In office 6 August 1904 – 28 February 1910
Preceded by	John Norton
Succeeded by	William Kearsley
Member of the New South Wales Legislative Assembly for Waratah
In office 5 December 1903 – 6 August 1904
Preceded by	Arthur Hill Griffith
Succeeded by	John Estell

Personal details
- Born: Matthew Charlton; 15 March 1866 Linton, Colony of Victoria
- Died: 8 December 1948 (aged 82) Lambton, New South Wales, Australia
- Resting place: Sandgate Cemetery, Sandgate
- Party: Labor
- Spouse: Martha Rollings (m. 1889)
- Education: Lambton Public School
- Occupation: Trade unionist; Politician

Matthew Charlton (15 March 1866 – 8 December 1948) was an Australian politician who served as leader of the Australian Labor Party (ALP) and Leader of the Opposition from 1922 to 1928. He led the party to defeat at the 1922 and 1925 federal elections.

Charlton was born in Linton, Victoria, but as a child moved to Lambton, New South Wales. He left school at a young age to work in the coal mines, initially as a hurrier. Charlton became prominent in the trade union movement, and in 1903 was elected to the New South Wales Legislative Assembly for the Labor Party. He switched to federal parliament in 1910. Charlton was an anti-conscriptionist, and remained with Labor after the party split of 1916. He was elected party leader in early 1922, following the death of Frank Tudor. He increased Labor's vote at the 1922 election but suffered a backwards slide in 1925. He resigned as leader in early 1928, succeeded by James Scullin, and left politics later that year.

== Early life ==
Little is recorded about Charlton's early life, as he grew up in a relatively unknown mining district. It is known, however, that Charlton was born on 15 March 1866 in Linton, Victoria, a small town near Ballarat that today has less than 500 residents. He was born to Matthew Charlton, an English miner from Durham, and Mabel (née Foard). In 1871, the five-year-old Charlton's father moved with his family to Lambton, a suburb of Newcastle, New South Wales. After primary education at Lambton Public School, Charlton began work at Lambton Colliery as a coal trapper; a children's-only job opening trapdoors for coal carts. When too old for the job, Charlton was given a job at the coal-face. At 23 he married Martha Rollings at nearby New Lambton.

== Emerging interest in politics ==
In 1896 plans to reduce coal workers' wages led to strike action. Charlton supported the struggle against wage reductions, but the effort failed and, along with many other miners, he moved to the goldfields near Kalgoorlie, Western Australia. After two years there, Charlton returned to Lambton and became an official in the Colliery Employees' Federation, becoming treasurer in 1901. While occupying that position, Charlton also prepared arbitration cases. Battling for an improvement in mine workers' conditions, he attended a trade union congress in November 1902, at which he moved for nationalisation of the coal mining industry, believing it would "eliminate cut-throat competition between owners that depressed miners' wages and conditions". That idea was opposed as being too radical but a compromise was drawn up urging state governments to open and run their own coal mines, while affirming the ultimate desirability of full nationalisation.

== State political career ==
Colleagues urged Charlton to stand for the state electoral district of Waratah, and on 5 December 1903 Charlton became the second member for the district in the New South Wales Legislative Assembly. His representation of that district was short-lived, as the next year he transferred to Northumberland, replacing John Norton. Charlton became the unofficial spokesperson for the miners, speaking principally about mining matters in parliament. In 1909 a coal miners' strike struck New South Wales and Charlton was called upon by the Colliery Employees' Federation to represent it in front of a wage board. Charlton was unsuccessful in gaining better conditions for the miners but he did settle the dispute, talking to miners around the state and convincing them to return to work. He resigned from state politics and in 1910 Charlton wrested the federal Division of Hunter from the sitting Frank Liddell. Hunter has remained a safe Labor seat ever since.

== Early federal career ==
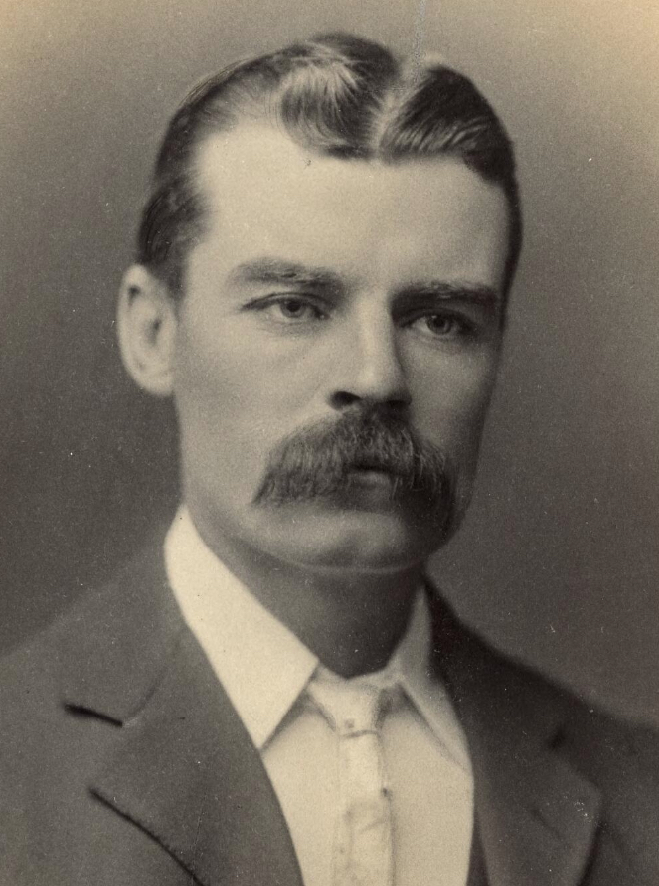
Charlton shortly after his election to federal parliament

Charlton was an immediate success with Andrew Fisher and was promoted to the temporary chairmanship of committees in the House in 1913, however Charlton threatened to resign in 1915 over a dispute in government delays in granting the committee increased powers. Fisher mollified him and in 1916 Charlton proved his loyalty to the new Labor leader Billy Hughes by voting for Hughes' conscription referendum bill, even though he was vehemently opposed to conscription and fought hard against it. However, Charlton seemed to accept the affirmative result of the referendum and again proved his loyalty to Hughes by defending him when he became the target of caucus criticism. Charlton attempted to deflect attacks made on Hughes to a party conference, but Hughes left the party before a decision could be made.

The new Labor leader Frank Tudor was a weak leader in health and political prowess. The successor-designate was T. J. Ryan, who had resigned as premier of Queensland in 1919 to federal politics. In August 1920, both Tudor and Ryan were taken ill while two of the Hughes government's most important bills were being debated (the Industrial Peace Bill and the Conciliation and Arbitration Bill). On 12 August, a special caucus meeting elected Charlton as acting leader in the House of Representatives; the party's deputy leader was Senator Albert Gardiner. Ryan died of pneumonia on 1 August 1921 after persistent ill health. On 29 September, the party elected Charlton as deputy leader in place of Ryan. Tudor died of heart disease on 10 January 1922, and Charlton became the de facto acting leader of the party. On 25 January, the party unanimously chose him as leader of the Labor Party in the House of Representatives, thus allowing him to become Leader of the Opposition. The overall leadership of the party remained vacant until 16 May, when Charlton won a ballot against Albert Gardiner (the party's sole senator). Gardiner was then chosen as his deputy.

== Leader of the Opposition ==
At the 1922 federal election, Charlton offered alternative policies and looked to be favourite until he was hospitalised with illness halfway through the campaign. Labor still won the most seats as a single party, but Charlton was unable to defeat a strong government coalition. Labor remained in opposition.

Because of great losses during World War I, Charlton opposed military training and commitments of Australian forces. In 1924 Charlton was invited to a League of Nations (now United Nations) conference in Geneva, Switzerland. At the conference Charlton strongly opposed war, and the Geneva Protocol took form. Upon his return to Australia, Charlton advocated adoption of the protocol, but the government sided with the British and refused to observe it.

Charlton lost the 1925 election, largely due to his stance on industrial relations and continual militant union action which plagued his campaign. Charlton always aided in maintaining amicable relations in the party and many times lent his expertise to conflicts within the NSW branch of the Labor Party. He resigned from his positions on 29 March 1928. His successor James Scullin went on to become the Prime Minister of Australia.

== Final years ==
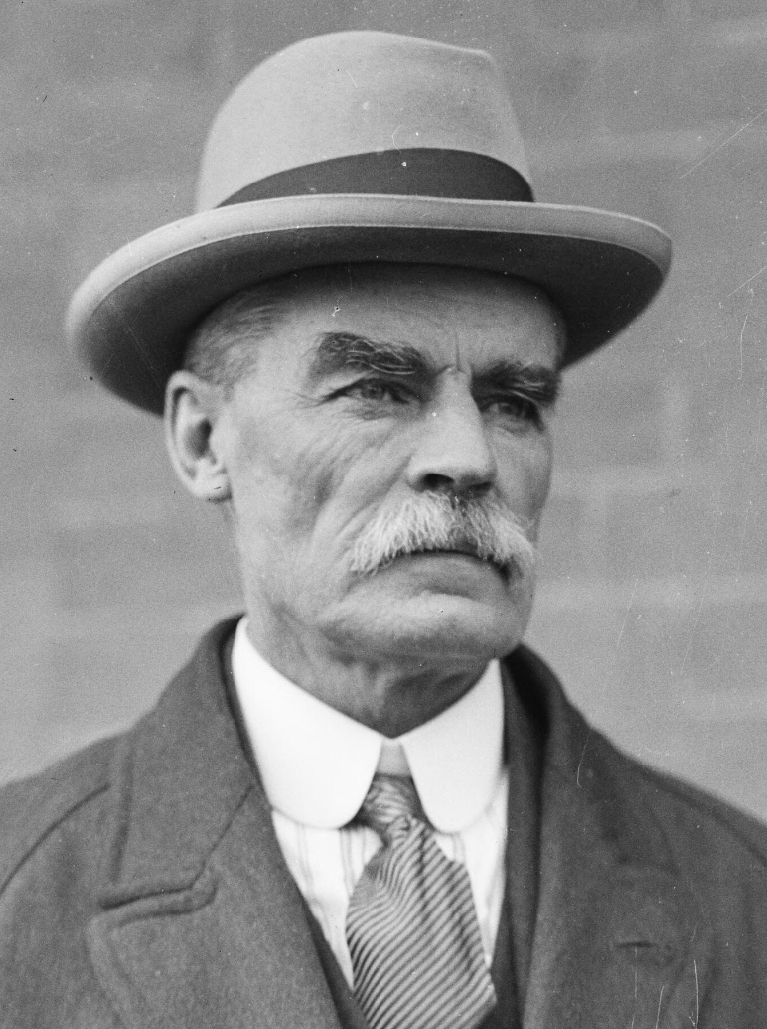
Charlton in 1928

Following retirement from federal politics, Charlton took an interest in local government and became an alderman on the Lambton Council from 1934 to 1938 (before its merger with the City of Newcastle). He died at Lambton, New South Wales, on 8 December 1948, the place where he had grown up and lived most of his life. Charlton was buried in the general section of Sandgate Cemetery. Martha Charlton died on 8 June 1955 and is interred with him. Their sons Matthew and Percy predeceased both of them.

The Division of Charlton in the Hunter Region was named in his honour, and was a safe Labor seat from its creation in 1984 until its abolition in 2016.

New South Wales Legislative Assembly
Preceded by Arthur Griffith	Member for Waratah; 1903–1904	Succeeded by John Estell
Preceded by John Norton	Member for Northumberland; 1904–1910	Succeeded by William Kearsley
Parliament of Australia
Preceded by Frank Liddell	Member for Hunter; 1910–1928	Succeeded by Rowley James
Political offices
Preceded by Frank Tudor	Leader of the Opposition; 1922–1928	Succeeded by James Scullin
Party political offices
Preceded by Frank Tudor	Leader of the Australian Labor Party; 1922–1928	Succeeded by James Scullin
