= Bert James =

Australian politician

Albert James
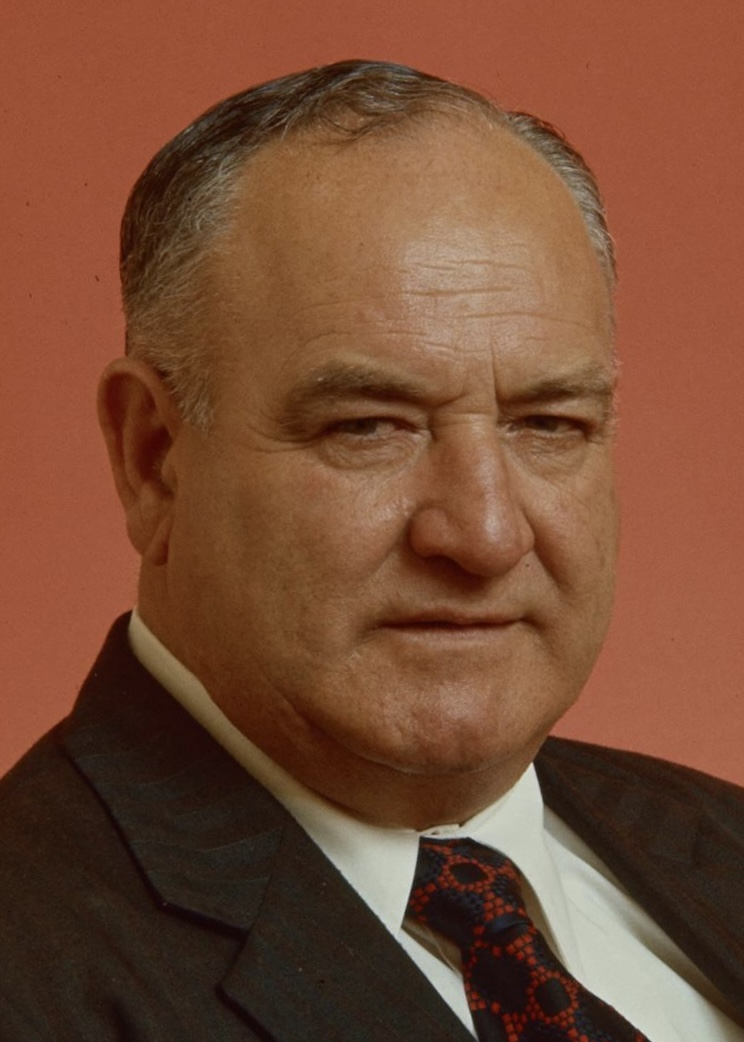
- James in 1974

Member of the Australian Parliament for Hunter
- In office 9 April 1960 – 19 September 1980
- Preceded by: H. V. Evatt
- Succeeded by: Bob Brown

Personal details
- Born: 22 September 1914 Collie, Western Australia
- Died: 30 September 2006 (aged 92) Booragul, New South Wales
- Party: Australian Labor Party
- Relations: Rowley James (father)
- Occupation: Policeman

Albert William James (22 September 1914 – 30 September 2006) was an Australian politician. He was born in Collie, Western Australia, the son of Rowley James, a future Labor member for Hunter in the Australian House of Representatives. Albert was educated at state schools in Kurri Kurri, New South Wales. He was a policeman from 1940 to 1960, when he contested the by-election for his father's old seat of Hunter that followed H. V. Evatt's resignation. He held Hunter until his retirement in 1980. James died in 2006.

== Links with the KGB ==
In 2014 newly released Russian intelligence archives revealed that James had been in regular contact with the Soviet embassy in Canberra in the early 1970s, although it was unclear what information he had passed on. ASIO files have confirmed the KGB connection.

Parliament of Australia
Preceded by H. V. Evatt	Member for Hunter; 1960–1980	Succeeded by Bob Brown
