= Division of Hunter =

Australian federal electoral division

Coordinates: 32.375°S 150.778°E

Hunter Australian House of Representatives Division
- Interactive map of electorate boundaries from the 2025 federal election
- Created: 1901
- MP: Dan Repacholi
- Party: Labor
- Namesake: Hunter River, named in turn after John Hunter
- Electors: 132,272 (2025)
- Area: 7,253 km^{2} (2,800.4 sq mi)
- Demographic: Rural
Electorates around Hunter:
New England	New England	Lyne
New England	Hunter	Paterson; Newcastle
Calare	Macquarie	Shortland

The Division of Hunter is an Australian electoral division in the state of New South Wales. The division was proclaimed in 1900, and was one of the original 65 divisions to be contested at the first federal election. The division was named after Captain John Hunter, the second Governor of New South Wales. It covers rural, regional and suburban areas centred on the Hunter Valley, including the towns of Singleton, Muswellbrook and Cessnock. It also extends into parts of Greater Newcastle, covering suburbs such as Cameron Park, Edgeworth, Toronto and Morisset.

Hunter is a largely blue-collar electorate. Hunter's economic base includes agriculture and mining, being dominated by a mix of rural and coal mining communities. The Hunter Region is one of the few remaining Labor-voting regional areas of New South Wales.

The current member since the 2022 federal election, is Dan Repacholi, a member of the Australian Labor Party.

== Geography ==
Since 1984, federal electoral division boundaries in Australia have been determined at redistributions by a redistribution committee appointed by the Australian Electoral Commission. Redistributions occur for the boundaries of divisions in a particular state, and they occur every seven years, or sooner if a state's representation entitlement changes or when divisions of a state are malapportioned.

== History ==
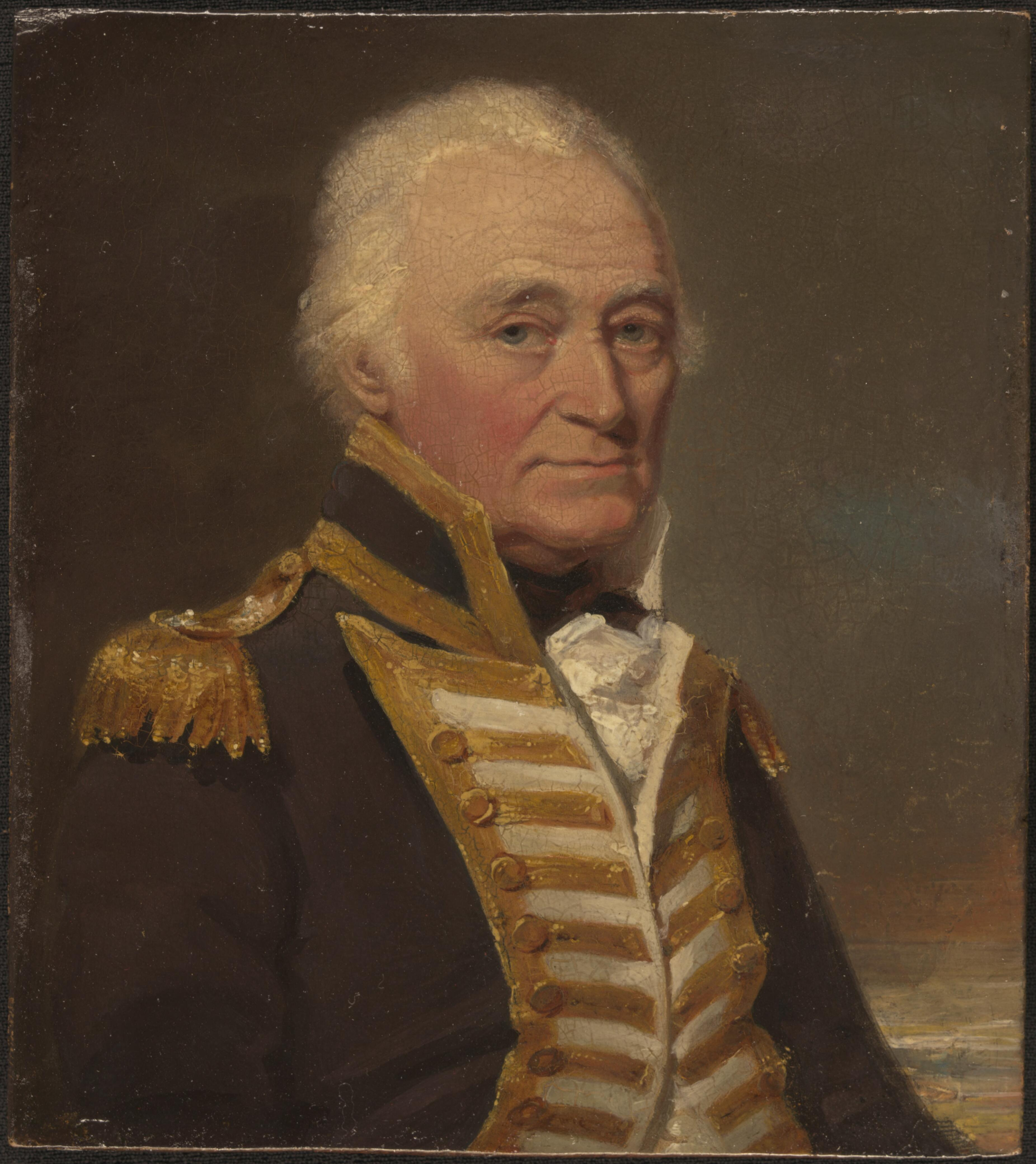
John Hunter, the division’s (and the Hunter region’s) namesake

The seat has been in Labor hands since 1910, and for most of that time has been reasonably safe for that party. The Hunter Region has been one of the few areas outside of capital cities where Labor has consistently done well. Among its notable members have been first Prime Minister, Sir Edmund Barton, former Labor Leaders Matthew Charlton and Dr H.V. Evatt, and Joel Fitzgibbon, who was a minister in the first and second Rudd governments.

The seat has been held by two father-son combinations. Rowley James held the seat from 1928 to 1958 before giving it up for Evatt, who was in danger of losing his Sydney-area seat of Barton and wanted a friendlier seat in which to run. Evatt was succeeded after one term by Rowley James' son, Bert, who held it until 1980. Eric Fitzgibbon won the seat in 1984, handing it to his son, Joel, in 1996.

=== Two-party vote count ===
Hunter had become somewhat marginal in the 1980s when much of its territory was shifted to the newly created Charlton. Since 1990, Labor has never tallied less than 53 percent of the two-party-preferred vote. Labor's worst two-party-preferred vote was 52.4% in 1984 and best result when challenged by an opposing centre-right candidate was 80.6% in 1961.

Hunter is one of Labor's only regional seats in New South Wales, likely due to it being a blue collar electorate. However, the Nationals and One Nation have increased their support over time due to Labor's policies on coal mining, a large industry in the region. However, the Labor MPs that represent Hunter often come from the Labor Right faction and support more conservative positions on coal mining.

=== First-preference vote count ===
Labor's worst first-preference vote was in 2019, when the current member won only 37.5% of the primary vote; the previous 100-year worst being 44.5% in 2013, again by the incumbent member. Labor's best primary vote was 76.9% in 1946. As of 2019, the Division of Hunter is considered a marginal seat.

=== 2015 proposed abolition ===
In 2015 the Australian Electoral Commission announced plans to abolish the federation seat of Hunter. Due to changing populations, overall, New South Wales was to lose a seat while Western Australia was to gain an extra seat. Electors in the north of Hunter were to join New England. The roughly 40 percent remainder were to become part of Paterson, with the Liberal margin calculated to be notionally reduced from 9.8 percent to just 0.5 percent as a result. Since the Commission's guidelines require it to preserve the names of original electorates where possible, the commission proposed renaming Charlton to Hunter. Effectively, this meant that Charlton was abolished, and Hunter pushed slightly eastward to absorb much of Charlton's former territory. Most voters of the new Hunter came from the former Charlton. However, Charlton's Labor incumbent, Pat Conroy, brokered a factional deal to contest neighbouring Shortland in order to allow Fitzgibbon to continue to represent the new Hunter.

== Boundaries ==
Redistribution	Map	Interactive	Elections	Notes
2007			2007	
2009			2010; 2013	
2016; 25 February			2016; 2019; 2022	
2024; 10 October			2025	

== Members ==
Image	Member	Party	Term	Notes
	Sir Edmund Barton (1849–1920)	Protectionist	30 March 1901 – 30 September 1903	Previously held the New South Wales Legislative Assembly seat of Hastings and Macleay. Served as Prime Minister from 1901 to 1903. Resigned to become a Justice of the High Court
	Frank Liddell (1862–1939)	Free Trade	16 December 1903 – 1906	Lost seat
	Frank Liddell (1862–1939)	Anti-Socialist	1906 – 26 May 1909	Lost seat
	Frank Liddell (1862–1939)	Liberal	26 May 1909 – 13 April 1910	Lost seat
	Matthew Charlton (1866–1948)	Labor	13 April 1910 – 9 October 1928	Previously held the New South Wales Legislative Assembly seat of Northumberland. Served as Opposition Leader from 1922 to 1928. Retired
	Rowley James (1885–1962)	Labor	9 October 1928 – 27 March 1931	Retired. Son was Bert James
	Rowley James (1885–1962)	Labor (NSW)	27 March 1931 – February 1936	Retired. Son was Bert James
	Rowley James (1885–1962)	Labor	February 1936 – 14 October 1958	Retired. Son was Bert James
	H. V. Evatt (1894–1965)	Labor	22 November 1958 – 10 February 1960	Previously held the Division of Barton. Served as Opposition Leader from 1951 to 1960. Resigned to become Chief Justice of the Supreme Court of New South Wales
	Bert James (1914–2006)	Labor	9 April 1960 – 19 September 1980	Retired. Father was Rowley James
	Bob Brown (1933–2022)	Labor	18 October 1980 – 1 December 1984	Previously held the New South Wales Legislative Assembly seat of Cessnock. Transferred to the Division of Charlton
	Eric Fitzgibbon (1936–2015)	Labor	1 December 1984 – 29 January 1996	Retired. Son is Joel Fitzgibbon
	Joel Fitzgibbon (1962–)	Labor	2 March 1996 – 11 April 2022	Served as minister under Rudd. Served as Chief Government Whip in the House under Gillard. Retired. Father was Eric Fitzgibbon
	Daniel Repacholi (1982–)	Labor	21 May 2022 – present	Incumbent

== Election results ==
2025 Australian federal election: Hunter
Party	Candidate	Votes	%	±%
Labor	Dan Repacholi	48,582	43.50	+4.07
National	Sue Gilroy	20,290	18.17	−6.51
One Nation	Stuart Bonds	18,011	16.13	+6.04
Greens	Louise Stokes	8,286	7.42	−1.40
Legalise Cannabis	Andrew Fenwick	5,655	5.06	+5.06
Trumpet of Patriots	Suellen Wrightson	4,068	3.64	+3.64
Family First	Paul Farrelly	2,644	2.37	+2.37
Shooters, Fishers, Farmers	Kyle Boddan	2,507	2.24	+2.24
Animal Justice	Victoria Davies	1,629	1.46	−0.61
Total formal votes		111,672	91.95	−0.68
Informal votes		9,782	8.05	+0.68
Turnout		121,454	91.88	+4.29
Notional two-party-preferred count
Labor	Dan Repacholi	66,424	59.48	+4.70
National	Sue Gilroy	45,248	40.52	−4.70
Two-candidate-preferred result
Labor	Dan Repacholi	65,926	59.04	+4.26
One Nation	Stuart Bonds	45,746	40.96	+40.96
Labor hold				
