= Division of Charlton =

Former Australian federal electoral division

Coordinates: 33.037°S 151.525°E

Charlton Australian House of Representatives Division
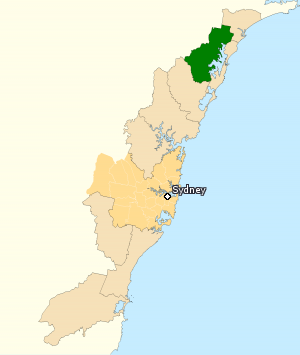
- Division of Charlton (green) in New South Wales
- Created: 1984
- Abolished: 2016
- Namesake: Matthew Charlton
- Area: 688 km^{2} (265.6 sq mi)
- Demographic: Provincial

The Division of Charlton was an Australian electoral division in the state of New South Wales. The division was created in 1984 and is named for Matthew Charlton, who was Leader of the Australian Labor Party 1922–28.

The division was located in the Hunter Valley of New South Wales, including the coal-mining towns of Cardiff and Wallsend as well as Toronto, Morisset, Cooranbong, Brightwaters, Windermere Park, Sunshine, Glendale and Warners Bay.

The division was renamed Division of Hunter in the 2016 federal election, while the previous Division of Hunter was abolished in the same election. The last Member for Charlton, from the 2013 federal election, was Pat Conroy, a member of the Australian Labor Party.

== History ==
Charlton was first created in 1984. Much of its territory came from Hunter, which Matthew Charlton held from 1910 to 1928. From its inception, it had been a safe seat for Labor. The Hunter Valley is one of the few areas outside capital cities where Labor has consistently done well.

The most prominent members were Bob Brown, a minister in the Hawke and Keating governments, and Greg Combet, a former secretary of the ACTU from 2000 to 2007, and a minister in the Gillard and Rudd governments.

During the 2013 federal election campaign, the Liberal Party endorsed Kevin Baker as their candidate for the division. However, Baker was forced to end his campaign on 21 August 2013 due to controversy over inappropriate content on a car enthusiasts' website that he hosted. The Australian Electoral Commission had closed candidate nominations by the time Baker abandoned his campaign. The Liberals did not field a replacement candidate in the election. However, Baker was still listed on ballot papers as the Liberal candidate, as they had already been printed at the time of Baker's resignation from the campaign; in excess of 24,500 electors gave him their first preference vote.

Under the original proposed redistribution for the 2016 federal election, the Division of Hunter was to be abolished. Since Hunter is an original Federation electorate, the Australian Electoral Commission's guidelines for redistributions required it to make every effort to preserve the Hunter name. To that end, the Commission proposed renaming Charlton to Hunter. Effectively, this meant that Charlton was abolished, and Hunter pushed slightly eastward to absorb much of Charlton's former territory. Although most voters of the new Hunter division came from the former Charlton division, Conroy stood down in favour of the member for the old Hunter division, Joel Fitzgibbon. Conroy contested and won the neighbouring seat of Shortland.

== Members ==
Image	Member	Party	Term	Notes
	Bob Brown (1933–2022)	Labor	1 December 1984 – 31 August 1998	Previously held the Division of Hunter. Served as minister under Hawke and Keating. Retired. Daughter is Kelly Hoare
	Kelly Hoare (1963–2024)	Labor	3 October 1998 – 17 October 2007	Lost preselection and retired. Father was Bob Brown
	Greg Combet (1958–)	Labor	24 November 2007 – 5 August 2013	Served as minister under Rudd and Gillard. Retired
	Pat Conroy (1979–)	Labor	7 September 2013 – 2 July 2016	Transferred to the Division of Shortland after Charlton was abolished in 2016
