= Greg Combet =

Australian politician and trade unionist

The Honourable Greg Combet AO
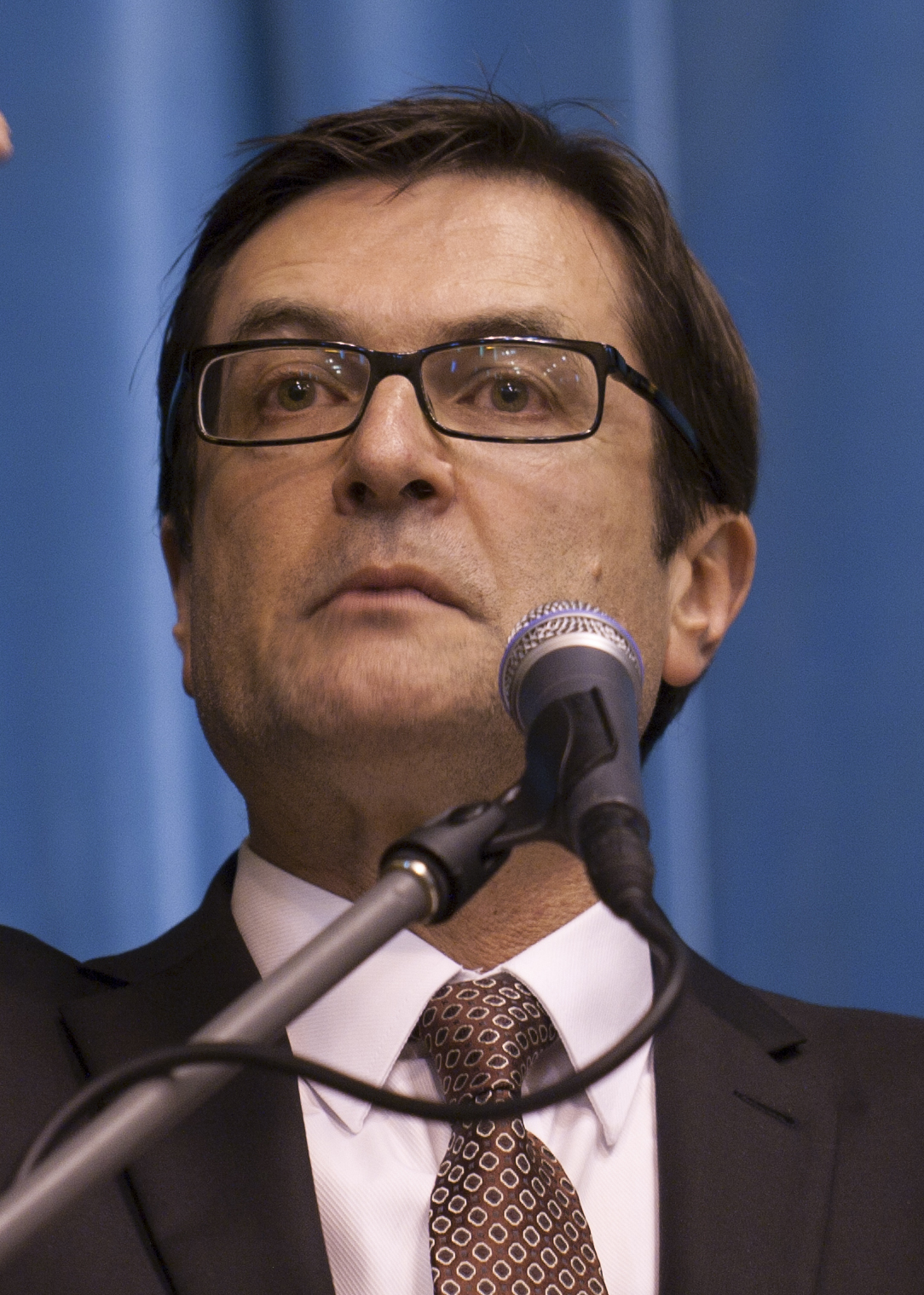

Minister for Industry and Innovation
- In office 14 December 2011 – 26 June 2013
- Prime Minister: Julia Gillard
- Preceded by: Kim Carr
- Succeeded by: Kim Carr

Minister for Climate Change and Energy Efficiency
- In office 14 September 2010 – 26 June 2013
- Prime Minister: Julia Gillard
- Preceded by: Penny Wong
- Succeeded by: Mark Butler

Minister for Defence Materiel and Science
- In office 9 June 2009 – 14 September 2010
- Prime Minister: Kevin Rudd; Julia Gillard
- Preceded by: Warren Snowdon
- Succeeded by: Jason Clare

Member of the Australian Parliament for Charlton
- In office 24 November 2007 – 5 August 2013
- Preceded by: Kelly Hoare
- Succeeded by: Pat Conroy

7th Secretary of the ACTU
- In office October 1999 – June 2007
- President: Jennie George; Sharan Burrow
- Preceded by: Bill Kelty
- Succeeded by: Jeff Lawrence

Personal details
- Born: Gregory Ivan Combet; 28 April 1958 (age 68) Sydney, New South Wales
- Party: Australian Labor Party
- Children: 1 daughter, 2 stepdaughters, 2 stepsons
- Education: University of New South Wales; University of Sydney
- Profession: Trade unionist, politician, company director

Gregory Ivan Combet AO (/ˈkɒmbeɪ/; born 28 April 1958) is the chairman of Australia's sovereign wealth fund, the Future Fund. Prior to this he served as chair of the Australian Government's Net Zero Economy Agency, establishing a government authority to oversee the economic transformation from fossil fuels to renewable energy and net zero emissions.

Combet was for many years an Australian labour movement leader. He is a former Labor politician and Cabinet Minister, former leader of the Australian Council of Trade Unions, former leader of profit-to-member superannuation funds and chair of investment manager IFM Investors.

Combet holds degrees in Mining Engineering and Economics, has a graduate diploma in Labour Relations and the Law, and has been awarded honorary doctorates from the University of South Australia, the University of Newcastle, and an honorary doctorate of engineering from the University of New South Wales.

He was elected member for the New South Wales Federal seat of Charlton for the Australian Labor Party at the 2007 election and was immediately appointed Parliamentary Secretary for Defence Procurement in the First Rudd Ministry on 3 December 2007.

Over the ensuing six years Combet was appointed to numerous Ministerial roles. These included responsibilities in the Climate Change, Defence and Industry portfolios. Combet was the Minister for Climate Change, Industry and Innovation in the Gillard Government and in this role successfully negotiated and legislated a carbon pricing scheme that reduced Australia’s greenhouse gas emissions.

Combet announced his resignation from the ministry on 26 June 2013 following Julia Gillard's defeat in a leadership ballot.

He retired from politics at the 2013 election.

Following his retirement from Parliament Combet worked as a company director and consultant. In 2020, Combet was appointed to the National COVID-19 Coordination Commission to "provide strategic and policy advice" for the Morrison Coalition government.

== Early life ==
Greg Combet was born in Sydney and attended Eastern Creek Primary school, then Rooty Hill High School from years 7 to 10. He completed his secondary education at Baulkham Hills High School. He was later educated at the University of New South Wales where he studied mining engineering, and then graduated from the University of Sydney with a Bachelor of Economics, and a Graduate Diploma in Labour Relations and the Law. He was a project officer for the New South Wales Tenants' Union, before working for the Lidcombe Workers' Health Centre. In 1987, he was employed by the Waterside Workers' Federation, now part of the Maritime Union of Australia.

== Union activity ==
Combet's association with the Australian Council of Trade Unions (ACTU) began in 1993 when he became a Senior Industrial Officer. In 1996 he was elected Assistant Secretary and in 1999 following the retirement of Bill Kelty, he became Secretary. Over his time at the ACTU, Combet has co-ordinated many union campaigns, and rose to prominence during the 1998 Australian waterfront dispute. Combet led successful campaigns to secure entitlements and compensation for the staff of the collapsed airline Ansett Australia, and in 2004 led the fight for asbestos victims of the James Hardie company. The asbestos compensation fund established at that time has paid out in excess $2 billion to victims over the ensuing 20 years. Combet cites the asbestos compensation fund in his autobiography as an especially proud achievement. In his capacity as Secretary of the ACTU, Combet led the Rights at Work campaign against the Howard government's WorkChoices industrial relations law changes.

== Parliament ==
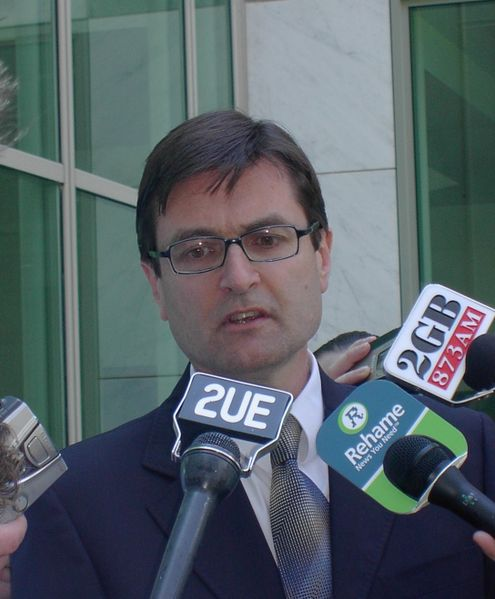
Combet speaking in November 2005, shortly after the Government introduced its WorkChoices legislation

On 4 May 2007 Combet announced his intention to run for the safe Labor seat of Charlton in Newcastle, New South Wales.

On 14 June 2007 Jeff Lawrence, National Secretary of the Liquor, Hospitality and Miscellaneous Union (LHMU) was elected unopposed as the next Secretary of the ACTU to succeed Combet.

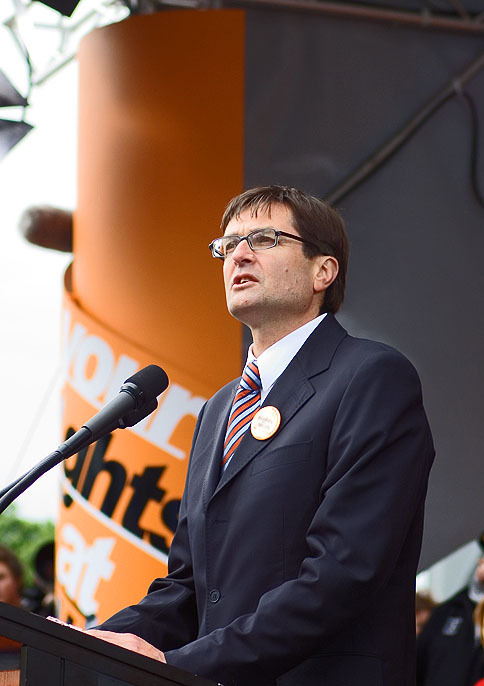
Combet speaking at the Your Rights at Work rally in Melbourne, 15 November 2005

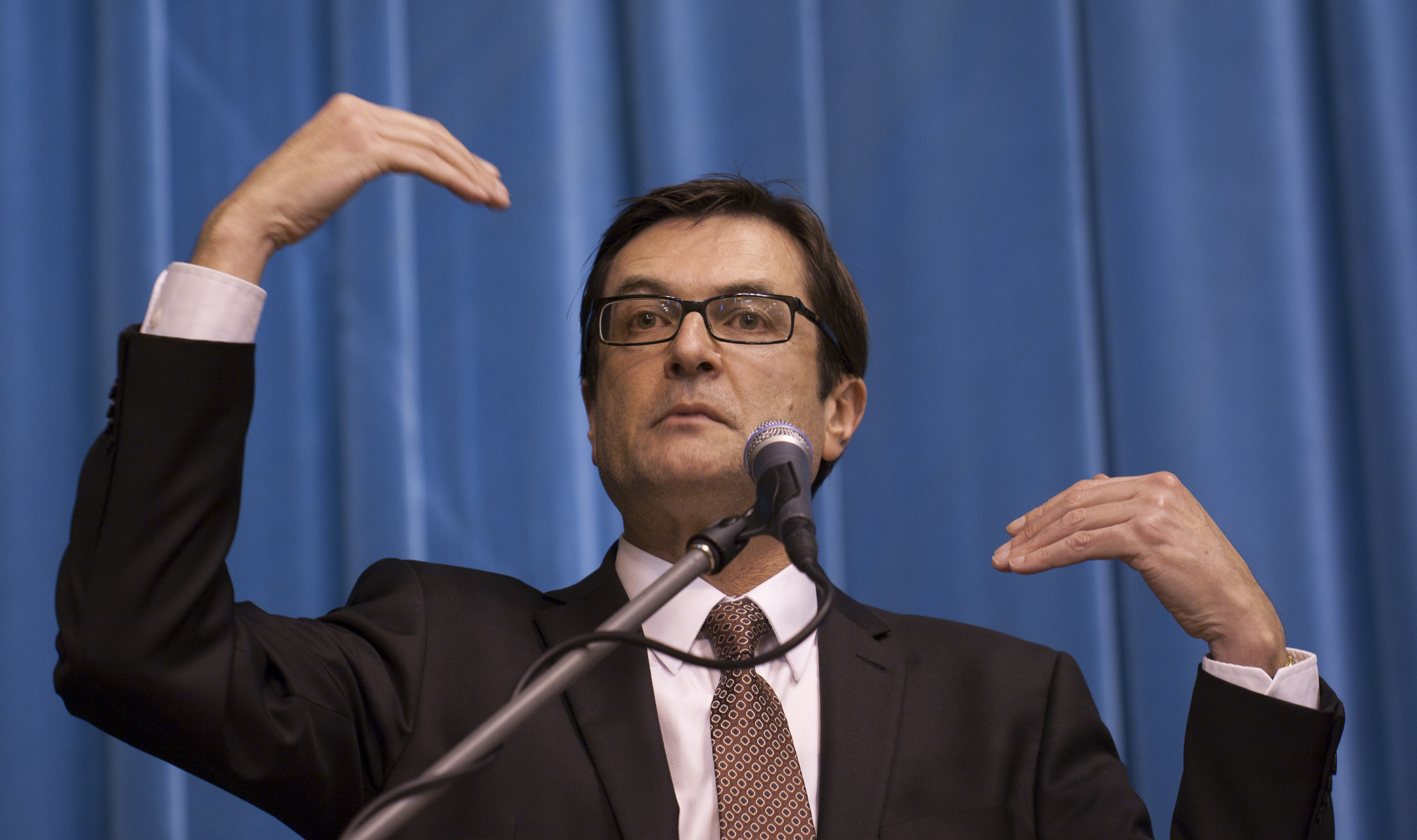
Combet explaining the effects of the proposed carbon pricing mechanism in 2011 during a public forum at Petersham town hall

Combet was elected as the new member for Charlton on 24 November 2007 as part of the ALP's victory in the 2007 Australian federal election, achieving a two party preferred swing of 4.47 per cent, winning 62.87 per cent of the two party vote. Following the election, Prime Minister Kevin Rudd appointed Combet as Parliamentary Secretary for Defence Procurement in the First Rudd Ministry. He was sworn in on 3 December 2007. In February 2009, Combet was appointed Parliamentary Secretary for Climate Change, with a focus on emissions trading, to assist Climate Change Minister Senator Penny Wong.

6 June 2009 Combet became Minister for Defence Personnel, Materiel and Science and Minister Assisting the Minister for Climate Change. Combet's portfolio was amended into April 2010 to Minister Assisting the Minister for Climate Change and Energy Efficiency and Minister for Defence Materiel and Science and to help him focus on the Government's energy efficiency programs, he axed part of this scheme—Home Insulation Program (HIP) in late April due to the safety risks and the blow-out in funding.

Combet was re-elected to Charlton at the 2010 federal election, suffering a post-redistribution two party swing of 0.24 per cent, winning 62.67 per cent of the two party vote. After Labor was returned to government in this election, Combet entered Cabinet, succeeding Wong as Minister for Climate Change and Energy Efficiency. Following the passage of the government's Clean Energy Bill, the portfolio of Industry and Innovation was added to Combet's responsibilities.

Combet had decided to step down over health concerns prior to Prime Minister Gillard's defeat in a leadership spill on 26 June 2013, but brought this decision forward and announced he would step down as minister and not contest his seat in the upcoming election. The seat of Charlton was subsequently won for the ALP by Combet's former advisor and chief-of-staff Pat Conroy.

== Post political career ==
Since leaving parliament, Combet has worked as a consultant to unions, governments and business and as a company director. Combet worked primarily with industry superannuation funds from 2013 to 2024 and in December 2018 became chair of Industry Super Australia and Chair of IFM Investors, a global asset management business owned by the industry superannuation funds.

In 2020, in response to the COVID-19 pandemic in Australia, Combet was appointed to "provide strategic and policy advice" for the Liberal Morrison government. In this role he helped create the JobKeeper program that sustained millions of people during the pandemic.

Combet, writing in The Guardian in late‑2021, describes Australia's failed climate policies and argues that a sensible energy transition is indeed possible. In 2023 he was appointed by Australian Prime Minister, Anthony Albanese, to chair the Net Zero Economy Agency (now Net Zero Economy Authority) to oversee the transformation of the economy to net zero emissions.

Combet was appointed chairman of the Future Fund in February 2024. The Future Fund is the largest financial asset of the Australian Government.

== Personal life ==
On 12 June 2006, Combet was appointed a Member of the Order of Australia for service to industrial relations and through advocacy for the improved health and safety of workers, including people affected by asbestos-related diseases, and to the community. He was promoted to Officer of the Order of Australia in the 2024 King's Birthday Honours.

Combet is separated from his second wife and in 2012 began a relationship with ABC-TV newsreader Juanita Phillips, who he lives with on the Northern Beaches.

Combet is the son of a winemaker and grew up on the Penfolds Minchinbury Estate in western Sydney. He is well known for breeding Gouldian finches.

In 2014, Combet published his autobiography The Fights of My Life.

In the 2007 ABC-TV series Bastard Boys, dramatising the 1998 Australian waterfront dispute, in which Combet was heavily involved, the role of Combet was played by Daniel Frederiksen.

== See also ==
- First Rudd Ministry
- First Gillard Ministry
- Second Gillard Ministry

Parliament of Australia
Preceded by Kelly Hoare	Member of Parliament for Charlton; 2007–2013	Succeeded by Pat Conroy
Political offices
Preceded by Warren Snowdon	Minister for Defence Materiel and Science; 2009–2010	Succeeded by Jason Clare
Preceded by Penny Wong	Minister for Energy and Climate Change; 2010–2013	Succeeded by Mark Butler
Preceded by Kim Carr	Minister for Industry and Innovation; 2011–2013	Succeeded by Kim Carr
Trade union offices
Preceded by Bill Kelty	Secretary of the Australian Council of Trade Unions; 1999–2007	Succeeded by Jeff Lawrence
