= Eric Fitzgibbon =

Australian politician (1936–2015)

Member of the Australian Parliament for Hunter
- In office 1 December 1984 – 29 January 1996
- Preceded by: Bob Brown
- Succeeded by: Joel Fitzgibbon

Personal details
- Born: 27 August 1936 Taree, New South Wales
- Died: 24 January 2015 (aged 78) Sandgate, New South Wales
- Party: Australian Labor Party
- Children: Mark Fitzgibbon, Joel Fitzgibbon
- Education: University of New England
- Occupation: Teacher

Eric John Fitzgibbon (27 August 1936 – 24 January 2015) was an Australian politician representing the Australian Labor Party.

Born in Taree, New South Wales, he attended the University of New England and became a teacher. He served on Cessnock City Council, and was mayor from 1981 to 1983. In 1984, he entered the Australian House of Representatives as the Labor member for Hunter. He held the seat until 1996, when he retired. He was succeeded by his son, Joel, who served as Minister for Defence. He died in 2015. Eric's grandson, Lachlan Fitzgibbon, plays rugby league for the Warrington Wolves (previously with Newcastle Knights).

Parliament of Australia
Preceded by Bob Brown	Member for Hunter; 1984–1996	Succeeded by Joel Fitzgibbon
