= Dan Repacholi =

Australian sport shooter and politician

Daniel Repacholi MP
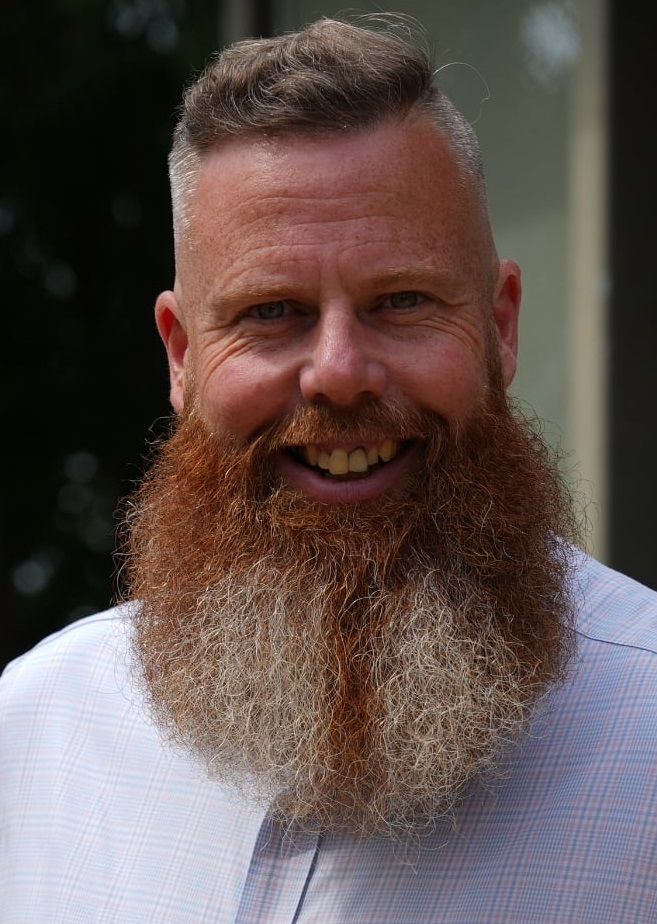
- Repacholi c. 2025

Member of the Australian Parliament for Hunter
- Incumbent
- Assumed office 21 May 2022
- Preceded by: Joel Fitzgibbon

Personal details
- Born: 15 May 1982 (age 44) Carlton, Victoria, Australia
- Party: Labor (since 2021)
- Spouse: Alex
- Children: 2
- Occupation: Coal miner, small business owner, politician
- Sports career
- National team: Australia
- Height: 202 cm (6 ft 8 in)
- Weight: 122 kg (269 lb)
- Sport: Sport shooting
- Coached by: Vladimir Galiabovitch
Medal record
Representing Australia
Men's shooting
Commonwealth Games
Gold medal – first place	2006 Melbourne	50m pistol pairs
Gold medal – first place	2014 Glasgow	10m air pistol
Gold medal – first place	2018 Gold Coast	50m pistol
Bronze medal – third place	2006 Melbourne	10m air pistol pairs
Bronze medal – third place	2010 Delhi	10m air pistol
Bronze medal – third place	2014 Glasgow	50m pistol

Daniel Repacholi (/ˌrɛpəˈkoʊli/ REP-ə-COH-lee; born 15 May 1982) is an Australian sport shooter and politician who has competed at five Olympic Games. He is a member of the Australian Labor Party (ALP) and was elected as a member for the New South Wales seat of Hunter in the 2022 election following the retirement of Joel Fitzgibbon.

Repacholi is a former coalminer and runs a small engineering business with 60 employees in the Hunter Valley. He is a member of the Cessnock Hall of Fame, having been inducted in May 2020 for services to sport.

== Early life ==
Repacholi has competed as a sports shooter since he was 12 years old. He started a trade apprenticeship at 15.

== Shooting career ==
Repacholi competed in the 10 metre air pistol, finishing in equal 36th place, and the 50 metre pistol, finishing 23rd, at the 2004 Summer Olympics in Athens. At the 2008 Summer Olympics in Beijing, he competed in the same events, finishing 31st in the 10 metre air pistol, and 40th in the 50 metre pistol. At the 2012 London Olympics he again competed in the two pistol events, finishing 28th in the 10 metre air pistol and 19th in the 50 metre pistol. He finished 28th in the 50 metre pistol and 44th in the 10 metre air pistol at the 2016 Summer Olympics in Rio de Janeiro.

Repacholi won a gold medal and a bronze medal at the 2006 Commonwealth Games in Melbourne. At the 2010 Commonwealth Games in Delhi, Repacholi won a bronze medal. At the 2014 Commonwealth Games in Glasgow, Repacholi won a gold medal in the 10m Air Pistol and bronze in the 50m Pistol events.

Repacholi qualified for the Tokyo 2020 Olympics, where he competed in the individual and team 10m air pistol events. He did not score sufficient points to advance past qualification.

== Political career ==
In October 2021, Repacholi was selected as the Australian Labor Party candidate for the Division of Hunter for the 2022 Australian federal election. He was endorsed by the Labor leader Anthony Albanese and the Construction, Forestry, Maritime, Mining and Energy Union (CFMEU). Some rank and file Labor members were angry with the lack of a rank and file vote to choose Repacholi as a candidate, in addition to his support of coal mining.

After the re-election of the Labor government in the 2025 Australian federal election, Repacholi was named Special Envoy for Men's Health in the second Albanese ministry.

=== Views ===
Repacholi has stated a focus on supporting the mining industry, and improving employment opportunities for tradesmen, trainees and apprentices. Repacholi has suggested that opponents of coal mining should "sit in the dark and freeze" in winter.

After competing in the 2010 Commonwealth Games in New Delhi, India, Repacholi described the country as a "shit hole" on social media. He has also published sexually explicit comments on social media and followed Instagram accounts featuring naked women posing with assault rifles and near-naked women in sexually provocative poses. Repacholi has apologised publicly for making these comments and deleted his Instagram account.

Repacholi supports the creation of a ministry for men, including a position focused on men's health.

Parliament of Australia
Preceded by Joel Fitzgibbon	Member for Hunter; 2022–present	Incumbent
