= Rowley James =

Australian politician (1885-1962)

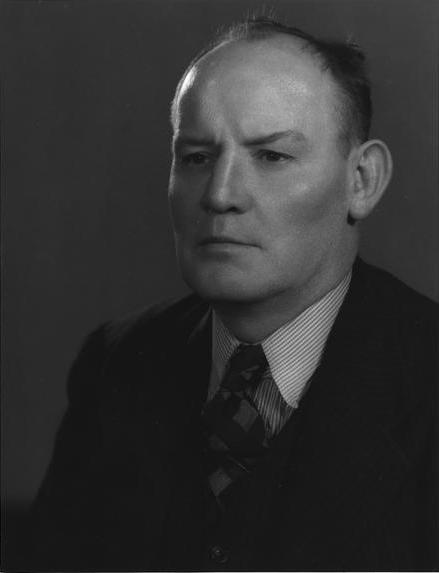

Member of the Australian Parliament for Hunter
- In office 17 November 1928 – 14 October 1958
- Preceded by: Matthew Charlton
- Succeeded by: H. V. Evatt

Personal details
- Born: 14 June 1885 Lambton, New South Wales
- Died: 4 July 1962 (aged 77) Ashfield, New South Wales
- Party: Labor (1928–31); Lang Labor (1931–36); Labor (1936–58)
- Spouse: Gladys Mary Davies
- Children: Bert James
- Occupation: Miner
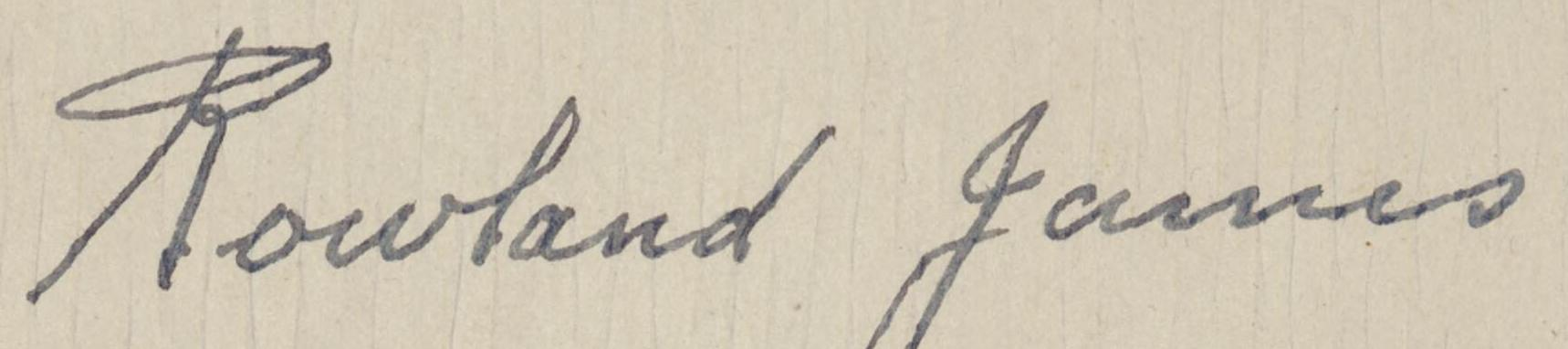
- Signature

Rowland "Rowley" James (14 June 1885 – 4 July 1962) was an Australian politician and coal miner. He was a member of the House of Representatives from 1928 to 1958, representing the New South Wales seat of Hunter. He was a member of the Australian Labor Party (ALP), although during the 1930s he was associated with the breakaway Lang Labor faction.

== Early life ==
James was born on 14 June 1885 in Lambton, New South Wales. He was the youngest of eleven children born to Welsh immigrant parents Mary Ann (née James) and Moses James. His father was a coal miner.

James attended a local public school before beginning work as a coal miner in the Newcastle district. In 1912, he moved to Collie, Western Australia, where he was lodge secretary of the Collie River District Miners' Union of Workers. He returned to New South Wales in 1916 and was an officeholder in the Australasian Coal and Shale Employees' Federation, representing the northern district on the union's central council. In 1928, he sought to succeed Daniel Rees as general president of the federation, but withdrew to stand for parliament.

== Politics ==
James was elected to the Australian House of Representatives for the Australian Labor Party in 1928, succeeding former Labor leader Matthew Charlton in the seat of Hunter. He was a critic of both the conservative government of Stanley Bruce and the Labor government of James Scullin for not prosecuting mine-owners during the protracted miner lock-out in northern New South Wales (1929–30), which led to accusations of inciting mob violence; Smith's Weekly published his record of convictions, including drunkenness and assaulting police.

A supporter of Jack Lang's proposal that New South Wales should not repay interest to British bond-holders in the height of the Great Depression, James joined Jack Beasley's Lang Labor Party, along with six other New South Wales MPs, who voted in opposition to defeat the Scullin government. At the ensuing elections, both Labor parties lost heavily but James easily retained his seat.

Re-admitted to the ALP in 1936, James was chairman of the parliamentary standing committee on public works from 1943, and led the Australian delegation to the first International Labour Organization coal-mining committee in London in 1945. He continued to be prominent in coal-mining affairs, and his support for Prime Minister Ben Chifley's stand on the 1949 coal strike prompted some to express a desire to expel him from the Miners' Federation.

A man who disliked convention, James was succeeded in the seat of Hunter in 1958 by ALP leader H. V. Evatt, who was in turn succeeded by James' son Bert. James died on 4 July 1962 in the Sydney suburb of Ashfield, and was survived by his wife, daughter and three of his five sons.

== Personal life ==
James married Gladys Mary Davies in 1912, with whom he had a daughter and five sons. He died on 4 July 1962 in Ashfield, New South Wales, aged 77. Two of his sons predeceased him.

James's son William Thomas James was a fitter on the NSW Railways, and he was shot and killed by Roy Hindle at the South Maitland railway workshop on 20 November 1941. Hindle was acquitted of the charge of murder.

Parliament of Australia
Preceded by Matthew Charlton	Member for Hunter; 1928 – 1958	Succeeded by H. V. Evatt
