= Joel Fitzgibbon =

Australian Labor politician, MP for Hunter 1996–2022

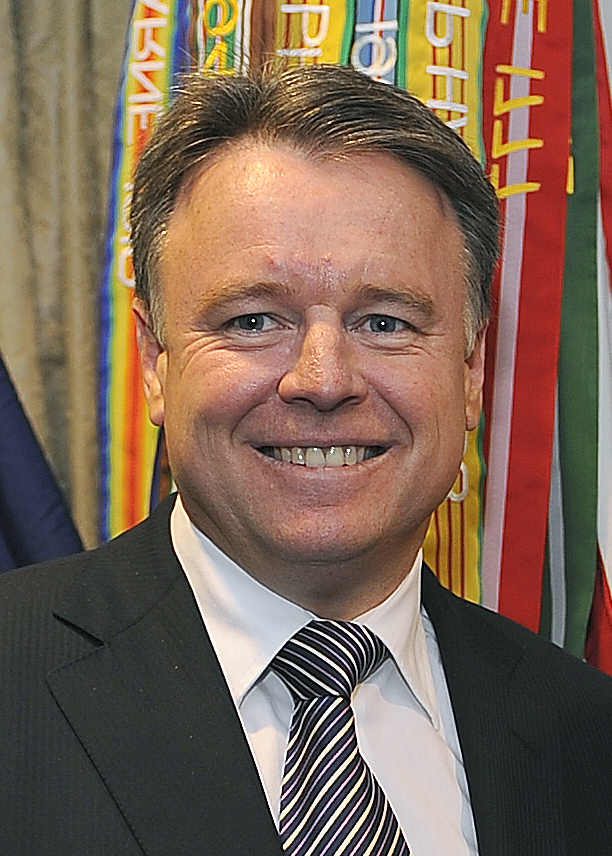

Minister for Defence
- In office 3 December 2007 – 4 June 2009 Serving with Kevin Rudd
- Preceded by: Brendan Nelson
- Succeeded by: John Faulkner

Minister for Agriculture, Fisheries and Forestry
- In office 1 July 2013 – 18 September 2013 Serving with Kevin Rudd
- Preceded by: Joe Ludwig
- Succeeded by: Barnaby Joyce

Chief Government Whip in the House of Representatives
- In office 19 October 2010 – 1 July 2013
- Preceded by: Roger Price
- Succeeded by: Joanne Ryan

Member of Parliament for Hunter
- In office 2 March 1996 – 11 April 2022
- Preceded by: Eric Fitzgibbon
- Succeeded by: Dan Repacholi

Personal details
- Born: Joel Andrew Fitzgibbon; 16 January 1962 (age 64) Bellingen, New South Wales, Australia
- Party: Australian Labor Party
- Spouse: Dianne Fitzgibbon
- Children: 3 (Jack, deceased; Caitlin; Grace)
- Education: University of Newcastle (GradCertBA)
- Occupation: Automotive electrician; politician

Joel Andrew Fitzgibbon (born 16 January 1962) is a retired Australian politician. He is a member of the Australian Labor Party (ALP) and represented the New South Wales seat of Hunter in the Australian House of Representatives from 1996 to 2022, a period of 26 years. He served as Minister for Defence (2007–2009) in the First Rudd Government and as Minister for Agriculture, Fisheries and Forestry (2013) in the Second Rudd Government. He was also Chief Government Whip in the House of Representatives (2010–2013) during the Gillard Government.

Fitzgibbon succeeded his father Eric Fitzgibbon in federal parliament. He is aligned with the Centre Unity faction in NSW, part of the federal Labor Right faction. He served as convenor of the NSW Right faction in federal parliament. Following Labor's defeat at the 2019 Australian federal election, he became a vocal critic of stronger climate change policies within his party, arguing that more ambitious emissions targets would cost Labor its blue-collar base.

== Early life and background ==
Fitzgibbon was born on 16 January 1962 in Bellingen, New South Wales. He grew up in the Hunter Region and trained as an automotive electrician, working in that trade from 1978 to 1990. He holds a Graduate Certificate in Business Administration from the University of Newcastle.

Fitzgibbon's father, Eric Fitzgibbon, was the federal Labor member for Hunter from 1984 to 1996. Joel served as his father's electorate officer from 1990 until 1996. He also worked as a part-time TAFE lecturer and small business operator during this period.

== Local government ==
Fitzgibbon served on the Cessnock City Council from 1987 to 1995, including as Deputy Mayor from 1989 to 1990. He was simultaneously active in the ALP, serving as secretary of the ALP Hunter Federal Electorate Council from 1990 to 1996 and as a delegate to the ALP State Conference (NSW) from 1990. He also served as NSW ALP Campaign Director in 1991 and 1995.

== Federal parliament (1996–2022) ==
=== Election to parliament ===
Fitzgibbon won ALP preselection for the seat of Hunter following his father's retirement prior to the 1996 Australian federal election. Hunter is one of Labor's few country strongholds, having been in Labor hands without interruption since 1910. He suffered a seven-point swing against him in 1996 but held the seat, and was subsequently re-elected at the 1998, 2001, 2004, 2007, 2010, 2013, 2016, and 2019 elections.

=== Opposition years (1996–2007) ===
Fitzgibbon was elected to the opposition shadow ministry in October 1998 and was appointed Shadow Minister for Small Business and Tourism, a role he held until 2001. He was subsequently appointed Shadow Minister for Mining, Energy and Forestry (2003–2005), before being appointed shadow assistant treasurer and shadow minister for revenue and for small business and competition in June 2005.

In early December 2006, when Kevin Rudd became Leader of the Opposition, Fitzgibbon was appointed Shadow Minister for Defence. He was subsequently appointed to the full ministerial role when Labor won office at the 2007 Australian federal election.

=== Minister for Defence (2007–2009) ===
Fitzgibbon was sworn in as Minister for Defence on 3 December 2007 in the First Rudd Government.

==== Defence White Paper 2009 ====
On 2 May 2009, Fitzgibbon and Prime Minister Kevin Rudd released the Defence White Paper titled Defending Australia in the Asia Pacific Century: Force 2030, the first such paper since the Howard Government's 2000 White Paper. The White Paper argued that Australia's core strategic interests lay in the Asia-Pacific region, emphasised China's growing military strength, predicted a decline in US primacy in the Asia-Pacific, and advocated a A$100 billion upgrade of Australia's naval and air force power over 20 years.

The White Paper confirmed the government's plan to acquire around 100 F-35 Joint Strike Fighters for the Royal Australian Air Force.

==== Helen Liu affair and resignation ====
In March 2009, Fairfax Media reported that Fitzgibbon had failed to declare two trips to China paid for by Helen Liu (also known as Liu Haiyan), a wealthy Chinese-Australian businesswoman with extensive connections to senior Chinese government and military officials. Fairfax also alleged that Defence Department officials had conducted a covert investigation into Fitzgibbon's relationship with Liu, believing it constituted a security risk, including alleged access to the computer network in his parliamentary office. Fitzgibbon denied wrongdoing and a subsequent inquiry by the Inspector General of Intelligence and Security found no evidence that the Defence Signals Directorate or any Defence official had secretly investigated the minister.

Fitzgibbon resigned as Minister for Defence on 4 June 2009 after admitting that meetings held between his brother Mark Fitzgibbon, the chief executive of health insurer NIB, and Defence officials concerning business opportunities had breached the Ministerial Code of Conduct. Prime Minister Rudd accepted the resignation, stating that the minister had "made mistakes related to accountability". He was succeeded as Defence Minister by John Faulkner.

=== Chief Government Whip (2010–2013) ===
Following his re-election at the 2010 Australian federal election, Fitzgibbon was elected by the Labor caucus as Chief Government Whip in the House of Representatives, a position he held throughout the Gillard Government from 19 October 2010 until 1 July 2013.

=== Minister for Agriculture (2013) ===
Following the June 2013 Labor leadership spill that returned Rudd to the prime ministership, Fitzgibbon was appointed Minister for Agriculture, Fisheries and Forestry in the Second Rudd Government on 1 July 2013, a position he held until the government's defeat at the 2013 Australian federal election on 18 September 2013.

=== Opposition (2013–2022) and redistribution ===
Fitzgibbon returned to opposition following Labor's 2013 election defeat and served as Shadow Minister for Agriculture and Resources, and later Shadow Minister for Agriculture and Rural and Regional Australia.

In 2015 the Australian Electoral Commission announced plans to abolish the seat of Hunter as part of a redistribution. Due to changing populations, New South Wales was to lose a seat while Western Australia was to gain one. The Commission proposed renaming the neighbouring seat of Charlton to Hunter. The final plan saw Charlton abolished, with Hunter pushed slightly eastward to absorb much of Charlton's former territory. The Labor incumbent for Charlton, Pat Conroy, opted to contest the neighbouring seat of Shortland to allow Fitzgibbon to contest the new Hunter seat at the 2016 Australian federal election.

At the 2019 Australian federal election, Fitzgibbon suffered a 9.5-point swing against him, reducing his margin to approximately three points. This sharp decline in support in a Labor heartland electorate that included significant coal industry employment reinforced his public position that Labor needed to return to its blue-collar base.

=== Climate debate and resignation from shadow cabinet ===
Following the 2019 defeat, Fitzgibbon became increasingly vocal in his criticism of Labor's climate policy direction, arguing that more ambitious emissions reduction targets were electoral poison in regional and resource-dependent communities. He described proposed 2030 targets as "delusional" and repeatedly called on the party to recommit to its "traditional base" of working-class and resource sector voters.

In November 2020, Fitzgibbon resigned from the shadow cabinet, stepping down from his roles as Shadow Minister for Agriculture and Resources. He framed the move as allowing him to more freely advocate his position from the backbench. The resignation followed a heated shadow cabinet meeting in which shadow attorney-general Mark Dreyfus reportedly confronted Fitzgibbon directly. He was replaced in the portfolio by right-faction MP Ed Husic.

His departure from the frontbench was quietly welcomed by many Labor colleagues and was seen as freeing the party to adopt a more ambitious climate policy heading into the 2022 Australian federal election. Commentators noted his sustained pressure on the party had contributed to Labor abandoning its 2030 emissions reduction target from the 2019 election and agreeing to support new gas projects.

=== Retirement ===
In September 2021, Fitzgibbon announced he would not recontest his seat at the next federal election, citing confidence that he had succeeded in returning the Labor Party to the "centre-ground" of politics. He left parliament on 11 April 2022 and was succeeded in the seat of Hunter by Dan Repacholi, who held the seat for Labor at the 2022 Australian federal election.

== Post-parliament career ==
In November 2022, Fitzgibbon was appointed interim Chief Executive Officer of the Australian Forest Products Association, effective from February 2023.

== Personal life ==
Fitzgibbon is based in Cessnock, in the Hunter electorate. He is married to Dianne Fitzgibbon. The couple have three children: Jack (deceased), Caitlin, and Grace.

=== Death of Lance Corporal Jack Fitzgibbon ===
On 6 March 2024, Fitzgibbon's son, Lance Corporal Jack Fitzgibbon, aged 33, died as a result of a parachuting accident while serving with the 2nd Commando Regiment of the Australian Army at RAAF Base Richmond, approximately 50 kilometres north-west of Sydney. Jack Fitzgibbon suffered critical head injuries when his parachute failed to deploy properly during a routine Special Forces training exercise. He was transported to Westmead Hospital in a serious condition and died on 7 March 2024.

In a statement delivered by Acting Special Operations Commander Brigadier James Kidd, Fitzgibbon said his family was "devastated and heartbroken" by the loss. "Serving in the special forces was Jack's dream job and we take some comfort from the fact that he died serving his nation in the uniform of the Australian Defence Force," the statement read. "Jack was a dedicated, highly skilled and courageous soldier. He was an experienced parachutist. Our lives will never be the same without Jack, but we will always remain proud of him and his many achievements."

Prime Minister Anthony Albanese and Defence Minister Richard Marles both offered tributes to Jack Fitzgibbon, with Marles noting that Joel Fitzgibbon was "a close friend of mine". A funeral service attended by hundreds of mourners, including the Prime Minister, was held at St Joseph's Catholic Church in Cessnock on 18 March 2024. Question Time in federal parliament was delayed to allow members to attend.

The ADF suspended all parachute training and opened an investigation into the accident. All parachute training exercises were paused while three independent investigations were conducted.

== Electoral history ==
Election	Votes	%	Swing
1996	—	—	−7.0%
1998	—	—	
2001	—	—	
2004	—	—	
2007	—	—	
2010	—	—	
2013	—	—	
2016	—	—	
2019	—	—	−9.5%
