= Bob Brown (Australian Labor politician) =

Australian politician (1933–2022)

The Honourable Bob Brown AM

Member of the Australian Parliament for Charlton
- In office 1 December 1984 – 31 August 1998
- Preceded by: New seat
- Succeeded by: Kelly Hoare

Member of the Australian Parliament for Hunter
- In office 18 October 1980 – 1 December 1984
- Preceded by: Bert James
- Succeeded by: Eric Fitzgibbon

Personal details
- Born: 2 December 1933 Pelaw Main, New South Wales
- Died: 30 March 2022 (aged 88)
- Party: Australian Labor Party
- Spouse: Elizabeth Joy Hirschausen
- Relations: Kelly Hoare (daughter)
- Education: University of Sydney; University of New England

Robert James Brown AM (2 December 1933 – 30 March 2022) was an Australian Labor Party politician.

== Early life ==
Brown was born in Pelaw Main and educated at Pelaw Main Primary School, Kurri Kurri Junior Technical High School, Maitland Boys High School, the University of Sydney (B.Ec), Sydney Teachers' College (Dip.Ed), Broken Hill Technical College and the University of New England. He married Elizabeth Joy Hirschausen in 1960 and had one daughter (Kelly Hoare) and one son.

== Political career ==
Brown first contested the then-safe Liberal seat of Paterson at the 1961 federal election. He gathered a 6.5% swing to Labor but failed to beat the sitting member and Menzies Government Minister, Allen Fairhall. Brown later contested and won the seat of Cessnock in the New South Wales Legislative Assembly and held it from 1978 to 1980.

He switched to federal politics, this time successfully contesting the nearby electorate of Hunter, holding it from 1980 until 1984. After a redistribution moved a large slice of Hunter to the new seat of Charlton, Brown transferred there and represented it from 1984 to 1998. He served as Minister for Land Transport from 1988 to 1993. He retired in 1998, and was succeeded in Charlton by his daughter, Kelly Hoare.

== Honours ==
On 11 June 2007, Brown was named a Member of the Order of Australia for "service to the Australian Parliament, particularly in the area of transport policy, to the community of the Hunter Region through local government, heritage and sporting organisations, and to economics education."

== Death ==
Brown died on 30 March 2022, aged 88. His funeral was held on 6 April 2022, a week after his death.

Political offices
Preceded by Peter Morris	Minister for Land Transport (and Shipping Support); 1988–1993	Title abolished
New South Wales Legislative Assembly
Preceded by George Neilly	Member for Cessnock; 1978–1980	Succeeded by Stan Neilly
Parliament of Australia
Preceded by Bert James	Member for Hunter; 1980–1984	Succeeded by Eric Fitzgibbon
New division	Member for Charlton; 1984–1998	Succeeded by Kelly Hoare
