= Mauritius at the 2014 Commonwealth Games =

- CG code: MRI
- CGA: Mauritius Olympic Committee

in Glasgow, Scotland
- Flag bearer: Kate Foo Kune
- Medals Ranked =27th: Gold 0 Silver 1 Bronze 1 Total 2

Commonwealth Games appearances (overview)
- 1958; 1962; 1966; 1970; 1974; 1978; 1982; 1986; 1990; 1994; 1998; 2002; 2006; 2010; 2014; 2018; 2022; 2026; 2030

Mauritius competed in the 2014 Commonwealth Games in Glasgow, Scotland from July 23 to August 3, 2014. Mauritius has 60 athletes competing in these games.

== Medalists ==
| Medal | Name | Sport | Event | Date |
|---|---|---|---|---|
| Silver | Kennedy St Pierre | Boxing | Men's light heavyweight | Aug 2 |
| Bronze | Annabelle Laprovidence | Judo | Women's +78 kg | July 26 |

== Athletics ==
Key

- Note – Ranks given for track events are within the athlete's heat only
- Q = Qualified for the next round
- q = Qualified for the next round as a fastest loser or, in field events, by position without achieving the qualifying target
- NR = National record
- N/A = Round not applicable for the event

Men

| Athlete | Event | Round 1 | | Semifinal | | Final | |
| Athlete | Event | Result | Rank | Result | Rank | Result | Rank |
|---|---|---|---|---|---|---|---|
| Jonathan Permal | 100 m | 10.46 PB | 3 | did not advance | | | |
| Jonathan Permal | 200 m | 21.21 | 4 | did not advance | | | |
| Nitesh Momine | 1500 m (T54) | 4:18.67 PB | 7 | —N/a | | did not advance | |
| Sebastien Ravet | 1500 m (T54) | 3:37.96 PB | 5 q | —N/a | | 3:42.97 | 9 |
| Jean Vilbrim | Marathon | —N/a | | | | 2:25:39 | 20 |

Field Events

| Athlete | Event | Qualification | | Final | |
| Athlete | Event | Distance | Rank | Distance | Rank |
|---|---|---|---|---|---|
| Jonathan Drack | Triple jump | 16.13 =PB | 8 q | did not start | |
| Sylvain Pierre Louis | Shot put | 15.23 | 18 | did not advance | |
| Elvino Pierre Louis | Discus throw | 50.57 | 16 | did not advance | |
| Mario Arimond | Discus throw (F42/44) | —N/a | | 24.85 PB | 11 |

Combined events – Decathlon

| Athlete | Event | 100 m | LJ | SP | HJ | 400 m | 110H | DT | PV | JT | 1500 m | Final | Rank |
|---|---|---|---|---|---|---|---|---|---|---|---|---|---|
| Guillaume Thierry | Result | 11.39 | 6.96 | 13.8 | 1.87 | 52.71 | 15.18 | 41.45 | 4.59 | 62.87 | 5:04.76 | 7303 | 11 |
| Guillaume Thierry | Points | 776 | 804 | 716 | 687 | 694 | 828 | 694 | 790 | 781 | 533 | 7303 | 11 |

Women
Track & road events

| Athlete | Event | Heat | | Semifinal | | Final | |
| Athlete | Event | Result | Rank | Result | Rank | Result | Rank |
|---|---|---|---|---|---|---|---|
| Joanilla Janvier | 100 m | 12.43 | 6 | did not advance | | | |
| Joanilla Janvier | 200 m | 25.30 | 5 | did not advance | | | |
| Aurelie Alcindor | 400 m | 57.39 | 7 | did not advance | | | |
| Aurelie Alcindor | 800 m | 2.13.80 | 8 | did not advance | | | |

Field events

| Athlete | Event | Qualification | | Final | |
| Athlete | Event | Distance | Position | Distance | Position |
|---|---|---|---|---|---|
| Jessika Rosun | Javelin throw | —N/a | | 47.39 | 12 |

== Badminton ==
Mixed team

Pool F

| Pos | Team | Pld | W | L | GF | GA | GD | PF | PA | PD | Pts | Qualification |
|---|---|---|---|---|---|---|---|---|---|---|---|---|
| 1 | England | 3 | 3 | 0 | 30 | 1 | +29 | 638 | 305 | +333 | 3 | Quarterfinals |
| 2 | Jersey | 3 | 2 | 1 | 20 | 12 | +8 | 558 | 518 | +40 | 2 | |
| 3 | Northern Ireland | 3 | 1 | 2 | 11 | 23 | −12 | 528 | 629 | −101 | 1 | |
| 4 | Mauritius | 3 | 0 | 3 | 4 | 29 | −25 | 412 | 684 | −272 | 0 | |

Source: glasgow2014.com

Mauritius
0
Commonwealth Arena, Glasgow
24 July

Jersey
5

| | | | 1 | 2 | 3 |
|---|---|---|---|---|---|
| 1 | (Mauritius) (Jersey) | Yeldy Louison / Sahir Edoo; Alexander Hutchings / Mariana Agathangelou | 10; 21 | 9; 21 |
| 2 | (Mauritius) (Jersey) | Julien Paul; Mark Constable | 9; 21 | 10; 21 |
| 3 | (Mauritius) (Jersey) | Kate Foo Kune; Elizabeth Cann | 12; 21 | 18; 21 |
| 4 | (Mauritius) (Jersey) | Julien Paul / Aatish Lubah; Mark Constable / Alexander Hutchings | 19; 21 | 22; 20 | 18; 21 |
| 5 | (Mauritius) (Jersey) | Kate Foo Kune / Yeldy Louison; Elizabeth Cann / Mariana Agathangelou | 10; 21 | 6; 21 |

Mauritius
1
Commonwealth Arena, Glasgow
25 July

Northern Ireland
4

| | | | 1 | 2 | 3 |
|---|---|---|---|---|---|
| 1 | (Mauritius) (Northern Ireland) | Julien Paul; Tony Stephenson | 13; 21 | 9; 21 |
| 2 | (Mauritius) (Northern Ireland) | Kate Foo Kune; Alannah Stephenson | 19; 21 | 21; 19 | 9; 21 |
| 3 | (Mauritius) (Northern Ireland) | Julien Paul / Aatish Lubah; Tony Stephenson / Tony Murphy | 19; 21 | 16; 21 |
| 4 | (Mauritius) (Northern Ireland) | Nicki Chan-Lam / Yeldy Louison; Sinead Chambers / Caroline Black | 8; 21 | 16; 21 |
| 5 | (Mauritius) (Northern Ireland) | Kate Foo Kune / Aatish Lubah; Ciaran Chambers / Sinead Chambers | 12; 21 | 21; 19 | 21; 17 |

England
5
Commonwealth Arena, Glasgow
26 July

Mauritius
0

| | | | 1 | 2 | 3 |
|---|---|---|---|---|---|
| 1 | (England) (Mauritius) | Rajiv Ouseph; Julien Paul | 21; 10 | 21; 8 |
| 2 | (England) (Mauritius) | Sarah Walker; Kate Foo Kune | 21; 8 | 21; 9 |
| 3 | (England) (Mauritius) | Chris Langridge / Peter Mills; Sahir Edoo / Aatish Lubah | 21; 14 | 21; 9 |
| 4 | (England) (Mauritius) | Kate Robertshaw / Heather Olver; Nicki Chan-Lam / Yeldy Louison | 21; 5 | 21; 6 |
| 5 | (England) (Mauritius) | Chris Langridge / Heather Olver; Aatish Lubah / Kate Foo Kune | 21; 7 | 21; 9 |

Men

| Athlete | Event | Round of 64 | Round of 32 | Round of 16 | Quarterfinals | Semifinals | Final | |
| Athlete | Event | Opposition Result | Opposition Result | Opposition Result | Opposition Result | Opposition Result | Opposition Result | Rank |
|---|---|---|---|---|---|---|---|---|
| Sahir Edoo | Singles | Palmer (JAM); W 21–15, 18–21, 21–14 | Ouseph (ENG); L 11–21, 6–21 | Did not advance | | | | |
| Aatish Lubah | Singles | Sam (GHA); L 21–16, 17–21, 17–21 | Did not advance | | | | | |
| Julien Paul | Singles | Henry (JAM); L 21–17, 15–21, 15–21 | Did not advance | | | | | |
| Aatish Lubah; Julien Paul | Doubles | Bye | Benjamin / Yon (SHN); W 21–3, 21–5 | Chrisnanta / Triyachar (SGP); L 11–21, 7–21 | Did not advance | | | |

Women

| Athlete | Event | Round of 64 | Round of 32 | Round of 16 | Quarterfinals | Semifinals | Final | |
| Athlete | Event | Opposition Result | Opposition Result | Opposition Result | Opposition Result | Opposition Result | Opposition Result | Rank |
|---|---|---|---|---|---|---|---|---|
| Nicki Chan-Lam | Singles | Marritt (IOM); L 15–21, 18–21 | Did not advance | | | | | |
| Kate Foo Kune | Singles | Liang (SGP); L 4–21, 3–21 | Did not advance | | | | | |
| Yeldy Louison | Singles | Amasah (GHA); W 21–14, 21–14 | Camille (SEY); W 15–21, 21–14, 21–19 | Gilmour (SCO); L 4–21, 6–21 | Did not advance | | | |
| Kate Foo Kune; Yeldy Louison | Doubles | —N/a | Fry / le Grange (RSA); L 20–22, 17–21 | Did not advance | | | | |

Mixed

| Athlete | Event | Round of 64 | Round of 32 | Round of 16 | Quarterfinals | Semifinals | Final | |
| Athlete | Event | Opposition Result | Opposition Result | Opposition Result | Opposition Result | Opposition Result | Opposition Result | Rank |
|---|---|---|---|---|---|---|---|---|
| Sahir Edoo; Yeldy Louison | Doubles | Hee / Fu (SGP); L 9–21, 9–21 | Did not advance | | | | | |
| Aatish Lubah; Nicki Chan-Lam | Doubles | Stephenson / Black (NIR); L 11–21, 11–21 | Did not advance | | | | | |
| Julien Paul; Kate Foo Kune | Doubles | Tam / Somerville (AUS); L 13–21, 17–21 | Did not advance | | | | | |

== Boxing ==
Mauritius has six men and two women

Men

| Athlete | Event | Round of 32 | Round of 16 | Quarterfinals | Semifinals | Final | |
| Athlete | Event | Opposition Result | Opposition Result | Opposition Result | Opposition Result | Opposition Result | Rank |
|---|---|---|---|---|---|---|---|
| Donovan Gerie | Light flyweight | Bye | Tetteh (GHA); L 0–3 | Did not advance | | | |
| John Colin | Lightweight | Okoth (KEN); L 0–3 | Did not advance | | | | |
| Richarno Colin | Light welterweight | Marcellin (LCA); W 3–0 | Taylor (SCO); L 0–3 | Did not advance | | | |
| Merven Clair | Welterweight | Okwiri (KEN); L 0–3 | Did not advance | | | | |
| Cedric Olivier | Middleweight | Langelier (LCA); W 3–0 | Makawa (MAW); W 3–0 | Muziyo (ZAM); L TKO R1 | Did not advance | | |
| Kennedy St-Pierre | Light heavyweight | Bye | Akankolim (GHA); W 3–0 | Samardali (AUS); W TKO R1 | Thorley (WAL); W TKO R3 | Nyika (NZL); W 3–0 | 2nd place, silver medalist(s) |

Women

| Athlete | Event | Round of 16 | Quarterfinals | Semifinals | Final | |
| Athlete | Event | Opposition Result | Opposition Result | Opposition Result | Opposition Result | Rank |
|---|---|---|---|---|---|---|
| Thessa Dumas | Flyweight | Walsh (NIR); L 0–3 | Did not advance | | | |
| Isabelle Ratna | Lightweight | Biniati (KIR); W 3–0 | Watts (AUS); L TKO R2 | Did not advance | | |

== Cycling ==
=== Mountain biking ===
| Athlete | Event | Time | Rank |
|---|---|---|---|
| Yannick Lincoln | Men's cross-country | 1:51:23 | 15 |
| Sebastien Tyack | Men's cross-country | LAP | 27 |
| Aurelie Halbwachs | Women's cross-country | DNF | |

=== Road ===
| Athlete | Event | Time | Rank |
|---|---|---|---|
| Mike Chong Chin | Men's road race | DNF | |
| Mike Chong Chin | Men's time trial | 59:23.11 | 39 |
| Jordan Lebon | Men's road race | DNF | |
| Yannick Lincoln | Men's road race | DNF | |
| Yannick Lincoln | Men's time trial | 55:08.31 | 21 |
| Sebastian Tyack | Men's road race | DNF | |
| Aurelie Halbwachs | Women's road race | DNF | |
| Aurelie Halbwachs | Women's time trial | 47:25.71 | 19 |

== Judo ==
Men

| Athlete | Event | Round of 32 | Round of 16 | Quarterfinals | Semifinals | Repechage | Final / BM | |
| Athlete | Event | Opposition Result | Opposition Result | Opposition Result | Opposition Result | Opposition Result | Opposition Result | Rank |
|---|---|---|---|---|---|---|---|---|
| Pascal Laurent | −60 kg | —N/a | Buchanan (SCO); L 0001-0200 | did not advance | | | | |

Women

| Athlete | Event | Round of 16 | Quarterfinal | Semifinal | Repechage | Final / BM | |
| Athlete | Event | Opposition Result | Opposition Result | Opposition Result | Opposition Result | Opposition Result | Rank |
|---|---|---|---|---|---|---|---|
| Christiane Legentil | −52 kg | Bye | K Edwards (ENG); L0001-0000 | did not advance | Mva (RSA); W1000-0001 | Thoudam (IND); L0003-0002 | 5 |
| Sarah Sylva | −57 kg | Bye | Sitcheping (CMR); L0001-1000 | Did not advance | Manuel (NZL); L0003-0001 | Did not advance | 7 |
| Annabelle Laprovidence | +78 kg | —N/a | Vaillancourt (CAN); W 1000-0000 | Myers (ENG); L 0001-1000 | Bye | Widanalage (SRI); L 100-001 | 3rd place, bronze medalist(s) |

== Squash ==
Mauritius has two squash athletes entered.

Singles

| Athlete | Event | Round of 128 | Round of 64 | Round of 32 | Round of 16 | Quarterfinals | Semifinals | Final | |
| Athlete | Event | Opposition Score | Opposition Score | Opposition Score | Opposition Score | Opposition Score | Opposition Score | Opposition Score | Rank |
|---|---|---|---|---|---|---|---|---|---|
| Xavier Koenig | Men's Singles | Bye | Matthew (ENG); L 3–11, 3–11, 1–11 | Did not advance | | | | | |
| Vanessa Florens | Women's Singles | —N/a | Bye | David (MAS); L 7–11, 6–11, 5–11 | Did not advance | | | | |

Doubles

| Athlete | Event | Group Stage | | | | Round of 16 | Quarterfinal | Semifinal | Final | |
| Athlete | Event | Opposition Score | Opposition Score | Opposition Score | Rank | Opposition Score | Opposition Score | Opposition Score | Opposition Score | Rank |
|---|---|---|---|---|---|---|---|---|---|---|
| Xavier Koenig; Vanessa Florens | Mixed doubles | Evans / Saffery (WAL); L 3–11, 0–11 | Ramasra / Sample (TTO); L 3–11, 5–11 | Selby / Kippax (ENG); L 6–11, 4–11 | 4 | Did not advance | | | | |

== Swimming ==
Men

| Athlete | Event | Heat | | Semifinal | | Final | |
| Athlete | Event | Time | Rank | Time | Rank | Time | Rank |
|---|---|---|---|---|---|---|---|
| Mathieu Marquet | 50 m freestyle | 24.12 | 29 | did not advance | | | |
| Bradley Vincent | 50 m freestyle | 23.20 | 15 Q | 23.09 | 15 | did not advance | |
| Mathieu Marquet | 100 m freestyle | 52.94 | 27 | did not advance | | | |
| Bradley Vincent | 100 m freestyle | 50.59 | 10 Q | 50.52 | 14 | did not advance | |
| Scody Victor | 100 metre freestyle S9 | 1:19.08 | 5 Q | —N/a | | 1:18.89 | 5 |
| Mathieu Marquet | 100 m backstroke | 1:02.55 | 29 | did not advance | | | |
| Bradley Vincent | 50 m butterfly | 25.79 | =22 | did not advance | | | |
| Mathieu Marquet | 100 m butterfly | 58.29 | 23 | did not advance | | | |

Women

| Athlete | Event | Heat | | Semifinal | | Final | |
| Athlete | Event | Time | Rank | Time | Rank | Time | Rank |
|---|---|---|---|---|---|---|---|
| Emily Chan Chee | 50 m freestyle | 27.83 | 34 | did not advance | | | |
| Olivia Plateau de Maroussen | 50 m freestyle | 26.99 | 21 | did not advance | | | |
| Emily Chan Chee | 100 m freestyle | 1:01.96 | 33 | did not advance | | | |
| Olivia Plateau de Maroussen | 100 m freestyle | 58.92 | 24 | did not advance | | | |
| Olivia Plateau de Maroussen | 200 m freestyle | 2:07.98 | 25 | —N/a | | did not advance | |
| Emily Chan Chee | 50 m backstroke | 32.63 | 24 | did not advance | | | |
| Emily Chan Chee | 50 m butterfly | 29.34 | 28 | did not advance | | | |
| Emily Chan Chee | 100 m butterfly | 1:07.39 | 24 | did not advance | | | |

== Triathlon ==
| Athlete | Event | Swim (1.5 km) | Bike (40 km) | Run (10 km) | Total Time | Rank |
|---|---|---|---|---|---|---|
| Boris De Chazal | Men's | 25:40 | Lapped | | | |
| Boris Toulet | Men's | 23:51 | Lapped | | | |
| Emilie Ng Foong Po | Women's | 24:08 | Lapped | | | |
| Fabienne St Louis | Women's | 24:07 | 1:13:05 | 43:43 | 2:22:00 | 16 |

Mixed Relay

| Athletes | Event | Total Times per Athlete (Swim 250 m, Bike 6 km, Run 1.6 km) | Total Group Time | Rank |
|---|---|---|---|---|
| Fabienne St Louis; Boris Toulet; Emilie Ng Foong Po; Boris De Chazal | Mixed relay | 21:11; 20:00; 22:12; 21:38 | 1:25:01 | 9 |

== Weightlifting ==
Men

| Athlete | Event | Snatch | Clean & Jerk | Total | Rank |
|---|---|---|---|---|---|
| Jonathan Coret | 56 kg | did not finish | | | |
| Cedric Coret | 77 kg | 111 | 148 | 25 | 15 |

Women

| Athlete | Event | Snatch | Clean & Jerk | Total | Rank |
|---|---|---|---|---|---|
| Hanitra Rahaivosoa | 58 kg | 82 | did not finish | | |
| Shalinee Valaydon | +75 kg | 90 | 116 | 206 | 8 |

== Wrestling ==
Men's freestyle

| Athlete | Event | Round of 32 | Round of 16 | Quarterfinal | Semifinal | Repechage | Final / BM | |
| Athlete | Event | Opposition Result | Opposition Result | Opposition Result | Opposition Result | Opposition Result | Opposition Result | Rank |
|---|---|---|---|---|---|---|---|---|
| Jean Bandoo | −57 kg | —N/a | Kumar (IND); L 0-5 | did not advance | | Masunyane (RSA); L 1-11 | Did not advance | 7 |
| Christophe Adroit | −65 kg | —N/a | Miller (NZL); L 6-7 | did not advance | | | | |
| Gilbert Emilie | −74 kg | Bye | Sandrage (SRI); L 8-7^{F} | did not advance | | | | |

F — Won by fall
