= Northern Ireland at the 2014 Commonwealth Games =

- CG code: NIR
- CGA: Northern Ireland Commonwealth Games Council
- Website: nicgc.org

in Glasgow, Scotland
- Flag bearer: Martyn Irvine
- Medals Ranked 15th: Gold 2 Silver 3 Bronze 7 Total 12

Commonwealth Games appearances (overview)
- 1934; 1938; 1950; 1954; 1958; 1962; 1966; 1970; 1974; 1978; 1982; 1986; 1990; 1994; 1998; 2002; 2006; 2010; 2014; 2018; 2022; 2026; 2030

Other related appearances
- Ireland (1930)

Northern Ireland competed in the 2014 Commonwealth Games in Glasgow, Scotland, from 23 July to 3 August 2014.

The team was named on 10 July. Northern Ireland finished 15th in the medal table with two gold medals, three silver medals and seven bronze medals.

== Medals ==
	(gold)	(silver)	(bronze)	Total
Northern Ireland	2	3	7	12

== Medalists ==
Medal	Name	Sport	Event	Date
Gold	Paddy Barnes	Boxing	Men's light flyweight	2 August
Gold	Michael Conlan	Boxing	Men's bantamweight	2 August
Silver	Paul Daly; Neil Mulholland; Neil Booth	Lawn Bowls	Men's triples	28 July
Silver	Joe Fitzpatrick	Boxing	Men's lightweight	2 August
Silver	Michaela Walsh	Boxing	Women's flyweight	2 August
Bronze	Lisa Kearney	Judo	Women's 52 kg	24 July
Bronze	Mandy Cunningham; Barbara Cameron	Lawn Bowls	Women's pairs	1 August
Bronze	Sean Duffy	Boxing	Men's light welterweight	2 August
Bronze	Steven Donnelly	Boxing	Men's welterweight	2 August
Bronze	Connor Coyle	Boxing	Men's middleweight	2 August
Bronze	Sean McGlinchy	Boxing	Men's light heavyweight	2 August
Bronze	Alanna Audrey-Murphy	Boxing	Women's lightweight	2 August

== Athletics ==
Key

- Note – Ranks given for track events are within the athlete's heat only
- Q = Qualified for the next round
- q = Qualified for the next round as a fastest loser or, in field events, by position without achieving the qualifying target
- NR = National record
- N/A = Round not applicable for the event
- Bye = Athlete not required to compete in round

Men

Track & road events

Athlete	Event	Heat		Semifinal		Final	
Athlete	Event	Result	Rank	Result	Rank	Result	Rank
Leon Reid	100 m	DQ		did not advance			
Jason Smyth	100 m	10.66	5	did not advance			
Leon Reid	200 m	20.97	3 q	21.03	8	did not advance	
Daniel Mooney	1500 m	3:45.79	10	—N/a		did not advance	
Paul Pollock	10,000 m	—N/a				29:11.46	19
Ben Reynolds	110 m hurdles	13.96	6	—N/a		did not advance	
Jason Harvey	400 m hurdles	52.06	5	—N/a		did not advance	

Field Events

Athlete	Event	Qualification		Final	
Athlete	Event	Distance	Rank	Distance	Rank
Dempsey McGuigan	Hammer throw	66.16	6 q	64.79	11

Combined events – Decathlon

Athlete	Event	100 m	LJ	SP	HJ	400 m	110H	DT	PV	JT	1500 m	Final	Rank
Peter Glass	Result	11.20	6.74	13.69	1.93	52.52	14.94	45.11	4.50	56.05	5:10.51	7287	12
Peter Glass	Points	817	1570	2279	3019	3721	4578	5347	6107	6786	7287	7287	12

Women

Track & road events

Athlete	Event	Heat		Semifinal		Final	
Athlete	Event	Result	Rank	Result	Rank	Result	Rank
Amy Foster	100 m	11.62	2 Q	11.54	5	did not advance	
Katie Kirk	800 m	2.03.00	2 Q	2:02.63	6	did not advance	
Christine McMahon	400 m hurdles	58.67	4	—N/a		did not advance	
Kerry O'Flaherty	3000 m steeplechase	—N/a				9:55.94	11
Gladys Ganiel	Marathon	—N/a				2:40:29	12

Field events

Athlete	Event	Qualification		Final	
Athlete	Event	Distance	Position	Distance	Position
Zoe Brown	Pole vault	—N/a		No Mark	

== Badminton ==
Individual

Athlete	Event	Round of 64	Round of 32	Round of 16	Quarterfinals	Semifinals	Final	Rank
Athlete	Event	Opposition Score	Opposition Score	Opposition Score	Opposition Score	Opposition Score	Opposition Score	Rank
Tony Stephenson	Men's singles	M Haque (BAN); W 2–0	P Vijayanath (RSA); W 2–0	C W Feng (MAS); L 0–2	did not advance			
Tony Murphy	Men's singles	K Ghislain (SEY); W 2–0	M Bhatti (PAK); W 2–1	K Merrilees (SCO); L 0–2	did not advance			
Alannah Stephenson	Women's singles	E Cann (JER); L 0–2	did not advance					
Sinead Chambers	Women's singles	J Snell (NFI); W 2–1	P C Thulasi (IND); L 0–2	did not advance				

Doubles

Athletes	Event	Round of 64	Round of 32	Round of 16	Quarterfinals	Semifinals	Final	Rank
Athletes	Event	Opposition Score	Opposition Score	Opposition Score	Opposition Score	Opposition Score	Opposition Score	Rank
Tony Murphy & Tony Stephenson	Men's doubles	Bye	D March & V Smeed (SHN); W 2–0	C Adcock & A Ellis (ENG); L 0–2	did not advance			
Caroline Black & Sinead Chambers	Women's doubles	—N/a	M Fu & V Neo (SIN); L 0–2	did not advance				
Tony Murphy & Alannah Stephenson	Mixed doubles	G Cupidon & J Ah-Wan (SEY); W 2–1	C Adcock & G Adcock (ENG); L 0–2	did not advance				
Ciaran Chambers & Sinead Chambers	Mixed doubles	H Zaki & M Ismali (MDV); W 2–0	D Ng & P Chan (CAN); L 0–2	did not advance				
Tony Stephenson & Caroline Black	Mixed doubles	A Lubah & N Chan Lam (MRI); W 2–0	G Henry & G Henry (JAM); W 2–0	T Ng & A Bruce (CAN); L 0–2	did not advance			

Mixed team

Pool F

Pos	Team	Pld	W	L	GF	GA	GD	PF	PA	PD	Pts	Qualification
1	England	3	3	0	30	1	+29	638	305	+333	3	Quarterfinals
2	Jersey	3	2	1	20	12	+8	558	518	+40	2	
3	Northern Ireland	3	1	2	11	23	−12	528	629	−101	1	
4	Mauritius	3	0	3	4	29	−25	412	684	−272	0	

Source: glasgow2014.com

England
5
Commonwealth Arena, Glasgow
24 July

Northern Ireland
0

			1	2	3
1	(England) (Northern Ireland)	Chris Adcock / Gabby Adcock; Ciaran Chambers / Sinead Chambers	21; 8	21; 17
2	(England) (Northern Ireland)	Rajiv Ouseph; Tony Stephenson	21; 5	21; 9
3	(England) (Northern Ireland)	Sarah Walker; Alannah Stephenson	21; 9	8; 21	21; 13
4	(England) (Northern Ireland)	Peter Mills / Chris Langridge; Tony Stephenson / Tony Murphy	21; 11	21; 9
5	(England) (Northern Ireland)	Kate Robertshaw / Heather Olver; Sinead Chambers / Caroline Black	21; 7	21; 10

Mauritius
1
Commonwealth Arena, Glasgow
25 July

Northern Ireland
4

			1	2	3
1	(Mauritius) (Northern Ireland)	Julien Paul; Tony Stephenson	13; 21	9; 21
2	(Mauritius) (Northern Ireland)	Kate Foo Kune; Alannah Stephenson	19; 21	21; 19	9; 21
3	(Mauritius) (Northern Ireland)	Julien Paul / Aatish Lubah; Tony Stephenson / Tony Murphy	19; 21	16; 21
4	(Mauritius) (Northern Ireland)	Nicki Chan-Lam / Yeldy Louison; Sinead Chambers / Caroline Black	8; 21	16; 21
5	(Mauritius) (Northern Ireland)	Kate Foo Kune / Aatish Lubah; Ciaran Chambers / Sinead Chambers	12; 21	21; 19	21; 17

Jersey
5
Commonwealth Arena, Glasgow
26 July

Northern Ireland
0

			1	2	3
1	(Jersey) (Northern Ireland)	Alexander Hutchings / Mariana Agathangelou; Ciaran Chambers / Sinead Chambers	21; 14	21; 16
2	(Jersey) (Northern Ireland)	Mark Constable; Tony Stephenson	21; 16	21; 8
3	(Jersey) (Northern Ireland)	Elizabeth Cann; Alannah Stephenson	21; 12	21; 15
4	(Jersey) (Northern Ireland)	Alexander Hutchings / Mark Constable; Ciaran Chambers / Tony Murphy	21; 18	17; 21	21; 18
5	(Jersey) (Northern Ireland)	Elizabeth Cann / Mariana Agathangelou; Sinead Chambers / Caroline Black	21; 9	21; 18

== Boxing ==
Northern Ireland has qualified boxers for the following events.

Men

Athlete	Event	Round of 32	Round of 16	Quarterfinals	Semifinals	Final	
Athlete	Event	Opposition Result	Opposition Result	Opposition Result	Opposition Result	Opposition Result	Rank
Paddy Barnes	Light flyweight	Bye	H Furahisha (TAN); W KO3	C Keama (PNG); W KO3	F Kaggwa (UGA); W 3–0	D Singh (IND); W 3–0	1st place, gold medalist(s)
Ruairi Dalton	Flyweight	C Katanga (ZAM); W 3–0	E Mwanjwango (TAN); W 3–0	A Moloney (AUS); L 0–3	did not advance		
Michael Conlan	Bantamweight	M Martin (NRU); W 3–0	S Thapa (IND); W 3–0	B Nasir (UGA); W 3–0	S McGoldrick (WAL); W 3–0	Q Ashfaq (ENG); W 3–0	1st place, gold medalist(s)
Joe Fitzpatrick	Lightweight	Bye	Q Mohlerepe (LES); W 2–1	N O Okoth (KEN); W 3–0	M Alexander (TRI); W 3–0	C Flynn (SCO); L 0–3	2nd place, silver medalist(s)
Sean Duffy	Light welterweight	D Mohamed (SRI); W 3–0	F Pius (TAN); W 2–1	K Azmi (MAS); W 3–0	J Jonas (NAM); L 0–3	Did not advance	3rd place, bronze medalist(s)
Steven Donnelly	Welterweight	H Asif (PAK); W KO1	O Finau (TON); W 3–0	C Clayton (CAN); W 3–0	M Jangra (IND); L 1–2	Did not advance	3rd place, bronze medalist(s)
Connor Coyle	Middleweight	L Dyamdeki (LES); W 3–0	D Thomas (GUY); W 2–1	S Lusizi (RSA); W 3–0	V Singh (IND); L 0–3	Did not advance	3rd place, bronze medalist(s)
Sean McGlinchy	Light heavyweight	Bye	C Clarke (JAM); W 2–1	E A Ochola (KEN); W 3–0	D Nyika (NZL); L 0–3	Did not advance	3rd place, bronze medalist(s)
Steven Ward	Heavyweight	W Baister (ENG); L 1–2	did not advance				

Women

Athlete	Event	Round of 16	Quarterfinals	Semifinals	Final	
Athlete	Event	Opposition Result	Opposition Result	Opposition Result	Opposition Result	Rank
Michaela Walsh	Flyweight	T Dumas (MRI); W 3–0	S J Rae (JAM); W 3–0	P Rani (IND); W 2–0	N Adams (ENG); L 1–2	2nd place, silver medalist(s)
Alanna Audrey-Murphy	Lightweight	Bye	V Spicer (DMA); W 2–1	S Watts (AUS); L 0–3	Did not advance	3rd place, bronze medalist(s)

== Cycling ==
=== Mountain biking ===
Athlete	Event	Time	Rank
Roger Robert Aiken	Men's cross-country	LAP	26
Claire Oakley	Women's cross-country	1:58.27	15

=== Road ===
Women

Athlete	Event	Time	Rank
Lydia Helene Boylan	Road race	2:50:55	21
Claire Oakley	Road race	DNF	

=== Track ===
Points race

Athlete	Event	Qualification		Final	
Athlete	Event	Points	Rank	Points	Rank
Martyn Irvine	Men's point race	3	12 Q	DNF	
Lydia Helene Boylan	Women's points race	—N/a		0	16

Scratch race

Athlete	Event	Qualification	Final
Athlete	Event	Rank	Rank
Martyn Irvine	Men's scratch race	5 Q	14
Lydia Helene Boylan	Women's scratch race	—N/a	14

Sprint

Athlete	Event	Qualification		Round 1	Repechage	Quarterfinals	Semifinals	Final	
Athlete	Event	Time	Rank	Opposition Time	Opposition Time	Opposition Time	Opposition Time	Opposition Time	Rank
James Brown; Dave Readle (Pilot)	Men's tandem sprint B	11.406	5	—N/a			did not advance		

Time trial

Athlete	Event	Time	Rank
James Brown; Dave Readle (Pilot)	Men's tandem time trial B	1:09.413	5

== Gymnastics ==
=== Men ===
- Luke Carson

=== Women ===
Athlete	Event	Final					
Athlete	Event	Apparatus				Total	Rank
Athlete	Event	V	UB	BB	F	Total	Rank
Sarah Beck	Team	12.700	11.466	11.233	10.966	46.365	Did not advance
Nicole Mawhinney	Team	13.266	10.700	11.533	12.433	47.932	21 Q
India McPeak	Team	12.266	10.200	11.233		—N/a	
Ciara Roberts	Team	12.433	9.333	9.008	12.166	42.940	Did not advance
Total	Team	38.399	32.366	33.999	35.565	140.329	9

Individual all around final

Athlete	Event	Final					
Athlete	Event	Apparatus				Total	Rank
Athlete	Event	V	UB	BB	F	Total	Rank
Nicole Mawhinney	Individual	13.300	11.266	11.733	12.266	48.565	17

== Judo ==
Men

Athlete	Event	Round of 32	Round of 16	Quarterfinals	Semifinals	Repechage	Final / BM	
Athlete	Event	Opposition Result	Opposition Result	Opposition Result	Opposition Result	Opposition Result	Opposition Result	Rank
Eoin Flemming	−73 kg	Bye	Jeanne (SEY); W 0101–0003	Williams (ENG); L 0002-1001	Did not advance	Ganzo (KEN); W 1000-0002	van Zyl (RSA); L 1010-0002	5
Caoimhin Thompson	−73 kg	Gosiewski (ENG); L 000–100	did not advance					
Mark Montgomery	−100 kg	Dugasse (SEY); L 1001-0001	did not advance					
Gavin McNeill	+100 kg	—N/a	Bye	Sherrington (SCO); L 0000-1000	Did not advance	Kumar (IND); L 0100-1001	Did not advance	7

Women

Athlete	Event	Round of 16	Quarterfinal	Semifinal	Repechage	Final / BM	
Athlete	Event	Opposition Result	Opposition Result	Opposition Result	Opposition Result	Opposition Result	Rank
Lisa Kearney	−52 kg	Bye	Mva (RSA); W1000-0000	K Edwards (ENG); L0001-0000	Bye	Francis-Méthot (CAN); W0100-0003	3rd place, bronze medalist(s)
Kirsty Kee	−63 kg	Béatrice Valois-Fortier (CAN); L 0000-1000	did not advance				

== Lawn bowls ==
Men

Athlete	Events	Club
Neil Booth	triples, fours	Old Bleach BC
Paul Daly	triples, fours	Ulster Transport BC
Ian McClure	pairs, fours	Portrush BC
Neil Mulholland	triples, fours	Lisnagarvey BC
Martin McHugh	singles, pairs	Whitehead BC

Women

Athlete	Events	Club
Barbara Cameron	pairs, triples, fours	Ballymena BC
Mandy Cunningham	pairs, triples, fours	Ewarts BC
Jennifer Dowds	triples, fours	Ballymena BC
Catherine McMillen	singles	Larne BC
Donna McCloy	triples, fours	Ballymena BC

== Netball ==
The Northern Ireland national netball team made their debut at the Commonwealth Games in 2014. They eventually finished seventh after defeating Wales by 58–36 in a classification match.

Squad

- Niamh Cooper
- Michelle Drayne
- Gemma Gibney
- Noleen Lennon
- Nordia Masters
- Lisa McCaffrey
- Oonagh McCullough
- Caroline O'Hanlon
- Lisa Somerville
- Fionnuala Toner
- Máire Toner
- Hannah Willis

Pool A

Team	Pld	W	L	PF	PA	PD	Pts	Qualification
New Zealand	5	5	0	337	151	+186	10	Semi-finals
Jamaica	5	4	1	344	184	+160	8	Semi-finals
Malawi	5	3	2	299	244	+55	6	
Northern Ireland	5	2	3	211	286	−75	4	
Scotland	5	1	4	165	268	−103	2	
Saint Lucia	5	0	5	141	364	−223	0	

Source: glasgow2014.com

24 July 2014
11:30

Report
Malawi
71 – 50
Northern Ireland

SECC Precinct
Umpires:
Gary Burgess (ENG)
Rachael Ayre (AUS)
Reserve umpire:
Clare McCabe (AUS)
Chimaliro 6/7 (86%)
Kumwenda 44/47 (94%)
Simtowe 21/21 (100%)

Lennon 20/21 (95%)
McCullough 9/18 (50%)
Somerville 21/26 (81%)

25 July 2014
19:00

Report
Jamaica
65 – 34
Northern Ireland

SECC Precinct
Umpires:
Tracy Smith (ENG)
Clare McCabe (AUS)
Reserve umpire:
Yvonne Morgan (NZL)
Beckford 12/16 (75%)
Harwood 4/7 (57%)
Reid 19/55 (35%)

Lennon 13/21 (62%)
McCullough 9/16 (56%)
Somerville 12/17 (71%)

27 July 2014
19:00

Report
Northern Ireland
29 – 78
New Zealand

SECC Precinct
Umpires:
Michelle Phippard (AUS)
Marie-Louw van der Merve (RSA)
Reserve umpire:
Clare McCabe (AUS)
Lennon 17/22 (77%)
McCullough 5/14 (36%)
Somerville 7/9 (78%)

Brown 45/52 (87%)
Francois 0/1 (0%)
Latu 32/34 (94%)
Tutaia 1/2 (50%)

28 July 2014
17:00

Report
Northern Ireland
61 – 40
Saint Lucia

SECC Precinct
Umpires:
Terrence Peart (JAM)
Clare McCabe (AUS)
Reserve umpire:
Theresa Prince (RSA)
Lennon 35/38 (92%)
McCullough 14/20 (70%)
Somerville 11/14 (79%)

Altifois-Fenelon 7/12 (58%)
Laurencin 9/11 (82%)
Maxwell 24/32 (75%)
Toner 1/3 (33%)

30 July 2014
17:00

Report
Scotland
32 – 37
Northern Ireland

SECC Precinct
Umpires:
Rachael Ayre (AUS)
Joshua Bowring (AUS)
Reserve umpire:
Tracy Smith (ENG)
Gallagher 19/24 (79%)
MacDonald 13/16 (81%)
Pettitt 0/1 (0%)

Lennon 32/48 (67%)
McCullough 5/10 (50%)

Seventh place match

1 August 2014
09:30

Report
Northern Ireland
58 – 36
Wales

SECC Precinct
Umpires:
Yvonne Morgan (NZL)
Michelle Phippard (AUS)
Reserve umpire:
Marie-Louw Van Der Merve (RSA)
McCullough 12/17 (71%)
Somerville 46/53 (87%)

James 7/9 (78%)
Lewis 21/27 (78%)
Moseley 7/14 (50%)
Thomas 1/3 (33%)

== Shooting ==
Men
Pistol/Small bore

Athlete	Event	Qualification		Final	
Athlete	Event	Points	Rank	Points	Rank
Gary Duff	50 m rifle prone	619.7	5 Q	98.4	7
Samuel Kelly	50 m rifle prone	615.3	15	did not advance	

Shotgun

Athlete	Event	Qualification		Semifinals		Final/BM	
Athlete	Event	Points	Rank	Points	Rank	Points	Rank
David Beattie	Trap	101	21	did not advance			
David Henning	Trap	103	20	did not advance			
Clement Buchanan	Skeet	108	17	did not advance			
David Christie	Skeet	112	15	did not advance			

Full bore

Athlete	Event	Stage 1	Stage 2	Stage 3	Total	
Athlete	Event	Points	Points	Points	Points	Rank
Jack Alexander	Individual	103-9v	149-18v	140-5v	392-32v	5
David Calvert	Individual	104-12v	148-19v	141-7v	393-38v	4
David Calvert; Jack Alexander	Pairs	298-32v	283-19v	—N/a	581-51v	9

Women
Pistol/Small bore

Athlete	Event	Qualification		Semifinals		Final	
Athlete	Event	Points	Rank	Points	Rank	Points	Rank
Louise Kathryn Aiken	50 m rifle prone	—N/a				603.5	20
Claudia Mcclung	50 m rifle prone	—N/a				606.5	18

Shotgun

Athlete	Event	Qualification		Semifinals		Final/BM	
Athlete	Event	Points	Rank	Points	Rank	Points	Rank
Kirsty Barr	Trap	69	3 Q	9	6	did not advance	

== Swimming ==
Men

Athlete	Event	Heat		Semifinal		Final	
Athlete	Event	Time	Rank	Time	Rank	Time	Rank
Curtis Coulter	50 m freestyle	23.23	16 Q	23.02	14	did not advance	
Conor Munn	50 m freestyle	23.88	24	did not advance			
David Thompson	50 m freestyle	23.79	21	did not advance			
Curtis Coulter	100 m freestyle	50.63	12 Q	50.48	12	did not advance	
Conor Munn	100 m freestyle	53.30	30	did not advance			
David Thompson	100 m freestyle	51.15	18	did not advance			
Jordan Sloan	200 m freestyle	1:50.01	12	—N/a		did not advance	
Jordan Sloan	50 m backstroke	26.25	11 Q	26.28	12	did not advance	
Jordan Sloan	100 m backstroke	58.01	16 Q	57.03	16	did not advance	
Michael Dawson	50 m breaststroke	28.92	14 Q	28.87	=12	did not advance	
Michael Dawson	100 m breaststroke	1:04.37	13 Q	1:04.65	16	did not advance	
Curtis Coulter	50 m butterfly	25.73	21	did not advance			
Conor Munn	50 m butterfly	25.57	20	did not advance			
Curtis Coulter	100 m butterfly	57.20	21	did not advance			
Curtis Coulter; Conor Munn; Jordan Sloan; David Thompson	4×100 m freestyle relay	3:23.84	9	—N/a		did not advance	
Curtis Coulter; Michael Dawson; Jordan Sloan; David Thompson	4×100 m medley relay	3:47.83	8 Q	—N/a		3:51.39	8

Women

Athlete	Event	Heat		Semifinal		Final	
Athlete	Event	Time	Rank	Time	Rank	Time	Rank
Rachel Bethel	50 m freestyle	27.70	32	did not advance			
Bethany Firth	50 m freestyle	27.61	31	did not advance			
Danielle Hill	50 m freestyle	27.23	22	did not advance			
Rachel Bethel	100 m freestyle	did not start		did not advance			
Bethany Firth	100 m freestyle	59.24	26	did not advance			
Rachel Bethel	200 m freestyle	2:07.01	22	—N/a		did not advance	
Danielle Hill	200 m freestyle	2:10.82	26	—N/a		did not advance	
Sycerika McMahon	200 m freestyle	did not start		—N/a		did not advance	
Rachel Bethel	400 m freestyle	4:34.30	21	—N/a		did not advance	
Sycerika McMahon	400 m freestyle	4:16.21	14	—N/a		did not advance	
Bethany Firth	50 m backstroke	32.80	26	did not advance			
Danielle Hill	50 m backstroke	30.77	14 Q	30.87	13	did not advance	
Bethany Firth	100 m backstroke	1:08.30	19	did not advance			
Danielle Hill	100 m backstroke	1:07.18	=16 Q^{[a]}	1:06.17	15	did not advance	
Danielle Hill	200 m backstroke	2:26.52	14	—N/a		did not advance	
Sycerika McMahon	50 m breaststroke	31.12	5 Q	31.56	9	did not advance	
Sycerika McMahon	100 m breaststroke	1:10.07	10 Q	1:09.41	13	did not advance	
Sycerika McMahon	200 m breaststroke	2:31.98	12	—N/a		did not advance	
Bethany Firth	50 m butterfly	28.51	22	did not advance			
Gemma Kane	50 m butterfly	28.22	20	did not advance			
Gemma Kane	100 m butterfly	1:02.51	16 Q	1:02.74	16	did not advance	
Gemma Kane	200 m butterfly	2:18.39	17	—N/a		did not advance	
Sycerika McMahon	200 m butterfly	2:15.53	14	—N/a		did not advance	
Bethany Firth	200 m individual medley	did not start		—N/a		did not advance	
Sycerika McMahon	200 m individual medley	2:16.14	11	—N/a		did not advance	
Rachel Bethel; Bethany Firth; Danielle Hill; Sycerika McMahon	4×100 m freestyle relay	3:54.53	8 Q	—N/a		3:52.88	8
Rachel Bethel; Bethany Firth; Danielle Hill; Gemma Kane	4×200 m freestyle relay	DSQ		—N/a		did not advance	
Rachel Bethel; Danielle Hill; Gemma Kane; Sycerika McMahon	4×100 m medley relay	4:22.34	8 Q	—N/a		DSQ	

^{a} Danielle Hill finished in equal 16th position in the heats alongside Kenya's Talisa Lanoe. A swim-off was held between the two competitors which Hill won and was awarded with the 16th and last qualification place in to the semifinal.

== Squash ==
Men

Athlete	Events	Club	Medals
Michael Craig	singles, mixed doubles	Belfast	

Women

Athlete	Events	Club	Medals
Madeline Perry	singles, mixed doubles	Banbridge	

== Table Tennis ==
Team Northern Ireland consisted of 7 table tennis players.

Men's Team

- Ashley Robinson
- Paul McCreery
- Peter Graham

Women's Team

- Amanda Mogey
- Ashley Givan
- Emma Ludlow
- Hannah Lynch-Dawson

== Triathlon ==
Athlete	Event	Swim (1.5 km)	Bike (40 km)	Run (10 km)	Total Time	Rank
Conor Murphy	Men's	18:35	59:20	33:40	1:52:29	12
Harry Speers	Men's	20:13	1:08:32	42:43	2:12:29	27
Russell White	Men's	18:48	1:02:31	37:00	1:59:20	23
Aileen Reid	Women's	19:39	1:03:57	35:11	1:59:46	6
Emma Sharkey	Women's	did not finish				

Mixed Relay

Athletes	Event	Total Times per Athlete (Swim 250 m, Bike 6 km, Run 1.6 km)	Total Group Time	Rank
Aileen Reid; Conor Murphy; Eimear Mullan; Russell White	Mixed relay	18:59; 17:48; 20:14; 18:51	1:15:52	6

== Wrestling ==
Men's freestyle

Athlete	Event	Round of 32	Round of 16	Quarterfinal	Semifinal	Repechage	Final / BM	
Athlete	Event	Opposition Result	Opposition Result	Opposition Result	Opposition Result	Opposition Result	Opposition Result	Rank
Norik Koczarian	65 kg	—N/a	M Tarash (AUS); L 2–5	did not advance				
Hugh McCloskey	97 kg	—N/a	Bye	A Gill (CAN); L 5–16	Did not advance	Bye	Bronze final S Belkin (NZL); L 5–16	4
