= Boxing at the 2014 Commonwealth Games =

Boxing competitions

- Venue: Scottish Exhibition and Conference Centre; The SSE Hydro (finals)
- Dates: 25 July – 2 August 2014

Boxing at the 2014 Commonwealth Games was the 20th appearance of the Boxing at the Commonwealth Games. The boxing competition took place in Glasgow, Scotland and were held from 25 July to 2 August at the Scottish Exhibition and Conference Centre, concluding on 2 August at The SSE Hydro.

For the first time ever women's boxing was contested with last being the 2012 Summer Olympics in London.

== Medal summary ==
=== Medal table ===
* Host nation (Scotland)

Rank	Nation	Gold	Silver	Bronze	Total
1	England	5	1	1	7
2	Northern Ireland	2	2	5	9
3	Australia	2	1	0	3
4	Scotland*	2	0	2	4
5	Canada	1	1	1	3
6	New Zealand	1	1	0	2
7	India	0	4	1	5
8	Mauritius	0	1	0	1
8	Namibia	0	1	0	1
8	Pakistan	0	1	0	1
11	Wales	0	0	5	5
12	Nigeria	0	0	3	3
13	Uganda	0	0	2	2
14	Ghana	0	0	1	1
14	Kenya	0	0	1	1
14	Mozambique	0	0	1	1
14	South Africa	0	0	1	1
14	Trinidad and Tobago	0	0	1	1
14	Zambia	0	0	1	1
Totals (19 entries)		13	13	26	52

Key

The host country is highlighted in lavender blue

=== Men's events ===
Event	Gold	Silver	Bronze
Light flyweight (49 kg)	Paddy Barnes; Northern Ireland	Devendro Laishram; India	Ashley Williams; Wales
Light flyweight (49 kg)	Paddy Barnes; Northern Ireland	Devendro Laishram; India	Fazil Juma Kaggwa; Uganda
Flyweight (52 kg)	Andrew Moloney; Australia	Muhammad Waseem; Pakistan	Abdul Omar; Ghana
Flyweight (52 kg)	Andrew Moloney; Australia	Muhammad Waseem; Pakistan	Reece McFadden; Scotland
Bantamweight (56 kg)	Michael Conlan; Northern Ireland	Qais Ashfaq; England	Sean McGoldrick; Wales
Bantamweight (56 kg)	Michael Conlan; Northern Ireland	Qais Ashfaq; England	Benson Gicharu Njangiru; Kenya
Lightweight (60 kg)	Charlie Flynn; Scotland	Joe Fitzpatrick; Northern Ireland	Joseph Cordina; Wales
Lightweight (60 kg)	Charlie Flynn; Scotland	Joe Fitzpatrick; Northern Ireland	Michael Alexander; Trinidad and Tobago
Light welterweight (64 kg)	Josh Taylor; Scotland	Jonas Junias; Namibia	Samuel Maxwell; England
Light welterweight (64 kg)	Josh Taylor; Scotland	Jonas Junias; Namibia	Sean Duffy; Northern Ireland
Welterweight (69 kg)	Scott Fitzgerald; England	Mandeep Jangra; India	Thulani Mbenge; South Africa
Welterweight (69 kg)	Scott Fitzgerald; England	Mandeep Jangra; India	Steven Donnelly; Northern Ireland
Middleweight (75 kg)	Antony Fowler; England	Vijender Singh; India	Connor Coyle; Northern Ireland
Middleweight (75 kg)	Antony Fowler; England	Vijender Singh; India	Benny Muziyo; Zambia
Light heavyweight (81 kg)	David Nyika; New Zealand	Kennedy St Pierre; Mauritius	Nathan Thorley; Wales
Light heavyweight (81 kg)	David Nyika; New Zealand	Kennedy St Pierre; Mauritius	Sean McGlinchy; Northern Ireland
Heavyweight (91 kg)	Samir El-Mais; Canada	David Light; New Zealand	Efetobor Apochi; Nigeria
Heavyweight (91 kg)	Samir El-Mais; Canada	David Light; New Zealand	Stephen Lavelle; Scotland
Super heavyweight (+91 kg)	Joseph Joyce; England	Joseph Goodall; Australia	Mike Sekabembe; Uganda
Super heavyweight (+91 kg)	Joseph Joyce; England	Joseph Goodall; Australia	Efe Ajagba; Nigeria

=== Women's events ===
Event	Gold	Silver	Bronze
Flyweight (48–51 kg)	Nicola Adams; England	Michaela Walsh; Northern Ireland	Pinki Rani; India
Flyweight (48–51 kg)	Nicola Adams; England	Michaela Walsh; Northern Ireland	Mandy Bujold; Canada
Lightweight (57–60 kg)	Shelley Watts; Australia	Laishram Devi; India	Alanna Audley-Murphy; Northern Ireland
Lightweight (57–60 kg)	Shelley Watts; Australia	Laishram Devi; India	Maria Machongua; Mozambique
Middleweight (69–75 kg)	Savannah Marshall; England	Ariane Fortin; Canada	Lauren Price; Wales
Middleweight (69–75 kg)	Savannah Marshall; England	Ariane Fortin; Canada	Edith Ogoke; Nigeria

== Participating nations ==
46 nations competed, leaving 25 that did not

- Antigua and Barbuda (2)
- Australia (11)
- Bahamas (4)
- Bangladesh (3)
- Barbados (3)
- Botswana (7)
- Canada (7)
- Cayman Islands (1)
- Cyprus (2)
- Dominica (1)
- England (11)
- Ghana (8)
- Grenada (2)
- Guyana (3)
- India (11)
- Isle of Man (1)
- Jamaica (4)
- Kenya (11)
- Kiribati (3)
- Lesotho (9)
- Malaysia (5)
- Mauritius (8)
- Malawi (2)
- Mozambique (4)
- Namibia (4)
- Nauru (3)
- New Zealand (9)
- Nigeria (11)
- Northern Ireland (11)
- Pakistan (6)
- Papua New Guinea (8)
- Rwanda (2)
- Saint Lucia (4)
- Samoa (6)
- Scotland (10)
- Seychelles (2)
- Sierra Leone (2)
- South Africa (6)
- Sri Lanka (10)
- Swaziland (1)
- Tanzania (9)
- Tonga (4)
- Trinidad and Tobago (2)
- Uganda (5)
- Wales (9)
- Zambia (5)

== See also ==
- Boxing at the 2014 Summer Youth Olympics
