= Judo at the 2014 Commonwealth Games – Women's +78 kg =

Judo Judo – Women's +78 kg at the 2014 Commonwealth Games
- Venue: Scottish Exhibition and Conference Centre
- Date: 26 July 2014
- Competitors: 7 from 7 nations

Medalists
gold medal	Sarah Adlington	Scotland
silver medal	Jodie Myers	England
bronze medal	Annabelle Laprovidence	Mauritius
bronze medal	Rajwinder Kaur	India

The women's +78 kg Judo competitions at the 2014 Commonwealth Games in Glasgow, Scotland was held on 26 July at the Scottish Exhibition and Conference Centre. Judo returned to the program after last being held at the 2002 Commonwealth Games.

== Results ==
=== Preliminaries ===
Quarterfinals		Semifinals		Gold medal match
		S Adlington (SCO)	1002
E Ratugi (KEN)	1011	E Ratugi (KEN)	0004
S Widanalage (SRI)	0000			S Adlington (SCO)	0013
A Laprovidence (MRI)	1000			J Myers (ENG)	0000
S Vaillancourt (CAN)	0000	A Laprovidence (MRI)	0001
J Myers (ENG)	1000	J Myers (ENG)	1000
R Kaur (IND)	0003

=== Repechages ===
Repechage		Bronze medal
		R Kaur (IND)	0000
S Vaillancourt (CAN)	0002	E Ratugi (KEN)	0003
R Kaur (IND)	0102

Bronze medal
S Widanalage (SRI)	000
A Laprovidence (MRI)	100
