= Boxing at the 2014 Commonwealth Games – Women's lightweight =

Boxing competitions

Boxing – Women's lightweight at the 2014 Commonwealth Games
- Venue: Scottish Exhibition and Conference Centre
- Dates: July 28 – August 2
- Competitors: 14 from 14 nations

Medalists
gold medal	Shelley Watts	Australia
silver medal	Laishram Devi	India
bronze medal	Maria Machongua	Mozambique
bronze medal	Alanna Audley-Murphy	Northern Ireland

The Women's lightweight boxing competition at the 2014 Commonwealth Games in Glasgow, Scotland took place between July 29 and August 2 at the Scottish Exhibition and Conference Centre. For the first time ever women's boxing will be contested.

Like all Commonwealth boxing events, the competition was a straight single-elimination tournament. Both semifinal losers were awarded bronze medals, so no boxers competed again after their first loss. Bouts consisted of four rounds of two minutes each, with a one-minute break between rounds. Punches scored only if the front of the glove made full contact with the front of the head or torso of the opponent. Three judges scored each bout; the winner of the bout was the boxer who won the most rounds.

== Medalists ==
Gold	Shelley Watts; Australia
Silver	Laishram Devi; India
Bronze	Maria Machongua; Mozambique
Bronze	Alanna Audley-Murphy; Northern Ireland

== Draw ==
All times are British Summer Time (UTC+1)

Round of 16; Tuesday 29 July 2014; 18:30
Alexis Pritchard (NZL)	0
Valerian Spicer (DMA)	3
Shelley Watts (AUS)	2
Natasha Jonas (ENG)	1
Isabelle Ratna (MRI)	3
Taoriba Biniati (KIR)	0
Laishram Devi (IND)	3
Kehinde Obareh (NGR)	0
Hansika Arachchi (SRI)	0
Charlene Jones (WAL)	3
Nthabeleng Mathaha (LES)	0
Maria Machongua (MOZ)	3

Quarter-finals; Thursday 31 July 2014; 13:40
Alanna Audley-Murphy (NIR)	2
Valerian Spicer (DMA)	1
Shelley Watts (AUS)	RSC
Isabelle Ratna (MRI)
Laishram Devi (IND)	2
Charlene Jones (WAL)	1
Maria Machongua (MOZ)	1
Keneilwe Rakhudu (BOT)	0

Semi-finals; Friday 1 August 2014; 13:50
Alanna Audley-Murphy (NIR)	0
Shelley Watts (AUS)	3
Laishram Devi (IND)	3
Maria Machongua (MOZ)	0

Final; Saturday 2 August 2014; 14:25
Shelley Watts (AUS)	3
Laishram Devi (IND)	0
