= Boxing at the 2014 Commonwealth Games – Light heavyweight =

Boxing competitions

Boxing – Light heavyweight at the 2014 Commonwealth Games
- Venue: Scottish Exhibition and Conference Centre
- Dates: 25 July – 2 August 2014
- Competitors: 19 from 19 nations

Medalists
gold medal	David Nyika	New Zealand
silver medal	Kennedy St Pierre	Mauritius
bronze medal	Sean McGlinchy	Northern Ireland
bronze medal	Nathan Thorley	Wales

The Light heavyweight boxing competition at the 2014 Commonwealth Games in Glasgow, Scotland took place between 25 July and 2 August at the Scottish Exhibition and Conference Centre. Light heavyweights are boxers who are between 75 kilograms (165 pounds) and 81 kilograms (178 pounds).

Like all Commonwealth boxing events, the competition was a straight single-elimination tournament. Both semifinal losers were awarded bronze medals, so no boxers competed again after their first loss. Bouts consisted of three rounds of three minutes each, with one-minute breaks between rounds. Punches scored only if the front of the glove made full contact with the front of the head or torso of the opponent. Five judges scored each bout; three of the judges had to signal a scoring punch within one second for the punch to score. The winner of the bout was the boxer who scored the most valid punches by the end of the bout.

== Schedule ==
All times are British Summer Time (UTC+1)

Date	Time	Round
Friday 25 July 2014	19:30	Round of 32
Sunday 27 July 2014	14:00 & 19:30	Round of 16
Tuesday 29 July 2014	19:10	Quarter-finals
Friday 1 August 2014	13:30	Semi-finals
Saturday 2 August 2014	19:10	Final

== Medalists ==
Gold	David Nyika; New Zealand
Silver	Kennedy St Pierre; Mauritius
Bronze	Sean McGlinchy; England
Bronze	Nathan Thorley; Wales

== Results ==
Round of 32
Ryan Charles (LCA)	0
Jordan Samardali (AUS)	2
Elly Ajowi Ochola (KEN)	2
Thabang Motsewabeng (BOT)	1
David Nyika (NZL)	2
Luvuyo Sizani (RSA)	0

Round of 16
Afaese Hugo Fata Kalepi (SAM)	1
Jordan Samardali (AUS)	2
Kennedy St Pierre (MRI)	3
David Akankolim (GHA)	0
Solomon Geko Kozaala (UGA)	0
Yakita Aska (ANT)	3
Benjamin Taualii (TON)
Nathan Thorley (WAL)	KO1
Lukman Lawal (NGR)	1
Elly Ajowi Ochola (KEN)	2
Cheavan Clarke (JAM)	1
Sean McGlinchy (NIR)	2
Mohamed Hakimu Fumu (TAN)	0
Sumit Sangwan (IND)	3
David Nyika (NZL)	3
Scott Forrest (SCO)	0

Quarterfinals
Jordan Samardali (AUS)
Kennedy St Pierre (MRI)	KO1
Yakita Aska (ANT)
Nathan Thorley (WAL)	KO1
Elly Ajowi Ochola (KEN)	0
Sean McGlinchy (NIR)	3
Sumit Sangwan (IND)	0
David Nyika (NZL)	3

Semifinals
Kennedy St Pierre (MRI)	3
Nathan Thorley (WAL)	0
Sean McGlinchy (NIR)	0
David Nyika (NZL)	3

Final
Kennedy St Pierre (MRI)	0
David Nyika (NZL)	3
