= Gary Cully =

Irish boxer (born 1996)

Personal information
- Nickname: The Diva
- Born: 26 January 1996 (age 30) Naas, Ireland
- Height: 6 ft 2 in (188 cm)
- Weight: Lightweight; Light-welterweight

Boxing career
- Stance: Southpaw

Boxing record
- Total fights: 20
- Wins: 18
- Win by KO: 10
- Losses: 2
Medal record
Men's amateur boxing
Representing Ireland
European Youth Championships
Gold medal – first place	2013 Rotterdam	Flyweight

Gary Cully (born 26 January 1996) is an Irish professional boxer who has held the Irish lightweight title since 2020. As an amateur he won a gold medal at the 2013 European Youth Championships and fought at the 2014 Youth World Championships.

== Amateur career ==
And then I think Rio didn’t help... and then seeing Mick [Conlan] being robbed as well... I’ve seen it in the [National] Stadium over the years, but when I saw how hard Michael trained for the Olympics, to go out and be robbed like that on the biggest stage – in front of the whole world, like – that was a big thing as well, yeah.

— Cully discussing his motivations for turning pro early

Cully began boxing at the age of seven at St David's Boxing Club in Naas. He won gold in the flyweight event of the 2013 European Youth Championships in Rotterdam, defeating Masud Yusifzada of Azerbaijan in the final and taking home the Best Boxer Award. He then represented his country at the 2014 AIBA Youth World Championships in Sofia, making his debut in the bantamweight class. He lost his first match by split decision to Ukrainian Voldymyr Fedora, who would eventually fall to Peter McGrail in the quarter-finals.

He was also a six-time underage Irish national champion and won the 2016 Haringey Box Cup in London, being named Best Overall Boxer in the process. Cully was defeated by future pro stablemate David Oliver Joyce in the quarter-finals of the 2016 Irish Elite Championships which ended any hopes of attempting to qualify for the Rio Olympics.

Having had ambitions of qualifying for the 2020 Olympics, Cully would become disillusioned with amateur boxing after rule changes and controversies such as compatriot Michael Conlan's loss to Vladimir Nikitin at Rio 2016.

== Professional career ==
In the summer of 2017, Cully signed with MTK Global and turned professional, linking up with trainer Pete Taylor - father of Katie. He made his debut on 16 September 2017, stopping Hungarian journeyman Gyula Tallosi inside a minute at the Devenish Complex in Belfast. A busy start to his pro career saw Cully then fight twice at the SSE Arena in Belfast, scoring impressive wins over durable Englishmen Josh Thorne and Kane Baker.

Following two more undercard wins in Belfast in the first half of 2018, Cully began to step up his level of opposition. First he would score a statement third-round stoppage over game Wearsider Jordan Ellison on 5 October 2018 at the Titanic Exhibition Centre before knocking out Tanzanian Mohammed Kambuluta (18–5, 7 KO) in the first round at the same venue on 7 December 2018 to improve to 7–0 as a pro.

The lilywhite had an uneventful 2019, only fighting twice due to a knuckle gash and missing out on a clash with French champion Renald Garrido as a result. After months of looking for a challenger for the Irish lightweight title, he finally won the vacant national belt on 1 February 2020 when he faced unbeaten local prospect Joe Fitzpatrick (10–0, 7 KO) at the Ulster Hall in Belfast. Cully would stop the 2014 Commonwealth Games silver medalist by first-round TKO for his first title.

Cully was expected to face Kieran Gething on 26 August 2020. Gething later withdrew from the bout, and was replaced by Craig Woodruff, who stepped in on 18-days notice. Cully won the fight on points. Six months later, on 13 March 2021, Cully faced Viktor Kotochigov for the vacant WBO European lightweight title. He made quick work of the Kazakh, as he won the fight by a second-round technical knockout. Cully faced Viorel Simion on 25 June 2021, in his second and final fight of the year. Simion retired from the bout at the end of the third round.

== Professional boxing record ==
22 fights	20 wins	2 losses
By knockout	11	1
By decision	9	1

No.	Result	Record	Opponent	Type	Round, time	Date	Location	Notes
22	Win	20–2	Lee Reeves	KO	10 (10), 0:53	1 Aug 2026	3Arena, Dublin, Ireland	Won vacant BUI Celtic super-lightweight title
21	Win	19–2	Benito Sanchez Garcia	PTS	6	14 Mar 2026	3Arena, Dublin, Ireland	
20	Loss	18–2	Maxi Hughes	UD	10	14 Dec 2024	Salle des Étoiles, Monte Carlo, Monaco	
19	Win	18–1	Francesco Patera	UD	10	25 May 2024	First Direct Arena, Leeds, England	
18	Win	17–1	Reece Mould	SD	10	25 Nov 2023	3Arena, Dublin, Ireland	
17	Loss	16–1	José Félix Jr.	TKO	3 (10), 2:34	20 May 2023	3Arena, Dublin, Ireland	
16	Win	16–0	Wilfredo Flores	TKO	3 (10), 1:52	18 Feb 2023	Motorpoint Arena, Nottingham, England	Won vacant WBA Inter-Continental lightweight title
15	Win	15–0	Jaouad Belmehdi	TKO	1 (10), 0:35	29 Oct 2022	Wembley Arena, London, England	
14	Win	14–0	Miguel Vázquez	KO	5 (10), 0:41	12 Mar 2022	Motorpoint Arena, Nottingham, England	
13	Win	13–0	Viorel Simion	RTD	3 (10), 3:00	25 Jun 2021	Bolton Whites Hotel, Bolton, England	
12	Win	12–0	Viktor Kotochigov	TKO	2 (10), 2:57	13 Mar 2021	Round 10 Boxing Club, Dubai, United Arab Emirates	Won vacant WBO European lightweight title
11	Win	11–0	Craig Woodruff	PTS	8	26 Aug 2020	Production Park Studios, South Kirkby, England	
10	Win	10–0	Joe Fitzpatrick	TKO	1 (10), 1:38	1 Feb 2020	Ulster Hall, Belfast, Northern Ireland	Won vacant Irish lightweight title
9	Win	9–0	Danny Mendoza	PTS	6	11 Oct 2019	Ulster Hall, Belfast, Northern Ireland	
8	Win	8–0	Brayan Mairena	PTS	6	29 Mar 2019	Ulster Hall, Belfast, Northern Ireland	
7	Win	7–0	Mohammed Kambuluta	KO	1 (8), 0:06	7 Dec 2018	Titanic Exhibition Centre, Belfast, Northern Ireland	
6	Win	6–0	Jordan Ellison	TKO	3 (6), 0:57	5 Oct 2018	Titanic Exhibition Centre, Belfast, Northern Ireland	
5	Win	5–0	Reynaldo Cajina	PTS	4	30 Jun 2018	SSE Arena, Belfast, Northern Ireland	
4	Win	4–0	Pal Olah	PTS	4	10 Feb 2018	Devenish Complex, Belfast, Northern Ireland	
3	Win	3–0	Kane Baker	PTS	4	18 Nov 2017	SSE Arena, Belfast, Northern Ireland	
2	Win	2–0	Josh Thorne	TKO	3 (4), 0:30	21 Oct 2017	SSE Arena, Belfast, Northern Ireland	
1	Win	1–0	Gyula Tallosi	TKO	1 (4), 0:42	16 Sep 2017	Devenish Complex, Belfast, Northern Ireland	

Sporting positions
Regional boxing titles
Vacant Title last held by Feargal McCrory	Irish lightweight champion 2 February 2020 – present	Incumbent
