= Kennedy St-Pierre =

Mauritian boxer (born 1992)

Personal information
- Nationality: Mauritian
- Born: 23 October 1992 (age 33)
- Height: 1.80 m (5 ft 11 in)

Sport
- Sport: Boxer
Medal record
Men's amateur boxing
Representing Mauritius
Commonwealth Games
Silver medal – second place	2014 Glasgow	Light heavyweight
African Games
Gold medal – first place	2011 Maputo	Middleweight
Gold medal – first place	2015 Brazzaville	Heavyweight

Joseph Kennedy St-Pierre (born 23 October 1992) is a Mauritian boxer who represented Mauritius at the 2016 Summer Olympics in Rio de Janeiro, where he competed in the men's heavyweight competition. He is a two time African Games gold medalist (one in the middleweight division and one in the heavyweight division) and a one time Commonwealth Games silver medalist (in the light heavyweight division). St-Pierre has also competed in another Commonwealth Games and an African Boxing Olympic Qualification Tournament.

== Competition ==
St-Pierre's debut at an international sporting competition was at the 2010 Commonwealth Games in Delhi, India. He reached the quarterfinals of the men's welterweight competition before losing 13–1 to Carl Hield of the Bahamas. St-Pierre then competed in the 2011 African Games which was held in Maputo, Mozambique. St-Pierre competed in, and won, the men's middleweight competition. He beat Algerian Saad Kaddous in the final. At the 2014 Commonwealth Games in Glasgow, Scotland, St-Pierre competed in the men's light heavyweight competition. He beat David Akankolim of Ghana, Australian Jordan Samardali and Welshman Nathan Thorley to reach the final of the competition. In the final, he lost 3–0 to New Zealander David Nyika and, therefore, claimed the silver medal. He was one of only two Mauritian medalists at the game, with female Judoka Annabelle Laprovidence the other. St-Pierre than competed in the 2015 African Games in Brazzaville, Republic of the Congo. St-Pierre won a gold medal in the men's heavyweight competition, beating Nigerian Efetobor Wesley Apochi in the final.

=== 2016 Summer Olympics ===
St-Pierre qualified for the 2016 Summer Olympics in Rio de Janeiro, Brazil by reaching the final of his event the 2016 African Boxing Olympic Qualification Tournament. He beat Algerian Chouaib Bouloudinat 2–1 in the final of the men's −91 kg competition. He said after qualifying that "I wasn’t feeling so fresh after my quarter-final and didn’t box my best today, but I am happy that I won the bout and achieved an Olympic quota place. I could not fight in London 2012 but I will be there in Rio de Janeiro, and that has been my sole target over the last four years." At the Rio games, St-Pierre competed in the men's heavyweight competition. After receiving a bye in the round of 32, St-Pierre drew Bouloudinat for the round of 16. St-Pierre won the fight 2–1 to progress to the quarterfinals. In the quarterfinals, St-Pierre lost 3–0 to Vasily Levit of Kazakhstan and was therefore eliminated from the competition. The event was won by Russian Evgeny Tishchenko, who beat Levit 3–0 in the final.
