= Jermaine Asare =

Wales boxer

Personal information
- Nationality: Welsh
- Born: 22 September 1983 (age 43) Cardiff, Wales
- Height: 185 cm (6 ft 1 in)

Boxing career
- Stance: Orthodox

Boxing record
- Total fights: 12
- Wins: 9
- Win by KO: 3
- Losses: 3
Medal record
Men's Boxing
Representing Wales
Commonwealth Games
Bronze medal – third place	2010 Delhi	Light heavyweight

Jermaine Robert Asare (born 22 September 1983) is a Welsh professional boxer. He represented Great Britain at the 2010 Commonwealth Games in Delhi, winning a bronze medal. He turned professional in 2013 and unsuccessfully challenged for the Welsh light-heavyweight title in 2017, suffering a defeat to Nathan Thorley.

== Early life ==
Born in Cardiff, Asare played football as a teenager and was part of the youth academies at both Cardiff City and Swansea City.

== Career ==
Asare, who hails from the Graigwen area of Pontypridd, took up boxing as a teenager and joined Pontypridd Amateur Boxing Club. He later fought for Merthyr Ex-servicemen's Club and recorded an amateur record of 19–6. Asare win the Welsh light-heavyweight amateur title in 2010 and was selected to represent Great Britain at the 2010 Commonwealth Games in Delhi. He won a bronze medal in the light heavyweight division. Asare secured the medal with a win over Samoa's Filimaua Hala.

Asare turned professional in 2013, winning his debut bout over Danny Mitchell via a points decision. He won two further bouts before suffering his first defeat to Eric Mokonzo in March 2016. He suffered a second defeat to Malik Zinad in 2017 before fighting Nathan Thorley for the vacant Welsh light-heavyweight title later the se year. Thorley won the bout when the referee stopped the fight in the second round after Asare had been knocked down.

== Personal life ==
Asare is also a self-employed electrician. In 2011 he received a 12-month prison sentence for affray and breaching a restraining order when he broke into his ex-partner's home.
