= Malik Zinad =

Libyan boxer (born 1993)

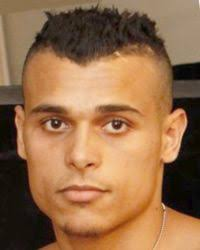

Personal information
- Nickname: The Trigger
- Nationality: Libyan
- Born: Almalek Alzanad; 19 November 1993 (age 32) Tripoli, Libya
- Height: 1.86 m (6 ft 1 in)
- Weight: Light heavyweight

Boxing career
- Stance: Orthodox

Boxing record
- Total fights: 25
- Wins: 24
- Win by KO: 18
- Losses: 1

Malik Zinad (Arabic: مالك زناد; born 19 November 1993) is a Libyan professional boxer who challenged for the WBA (Super) and IBO light heavyweight titles in 2024.

== Early life ==
Zinad was born on 19 November 1993 in Tripoli, Libya. His father, a former boxer himself, began training him in the sport when he was five, though they practised in the basement of their home due to Muammar Gaddafi's ban on boxing. However, Zinad left his country in 2013 due to the unrest following Gaddafi's death, eventually settling in the island nation of Malta after his father encouraged him to follow his dreams.

Zinad had about 25 bouts in his amateur career, (Note: Zinad's amateur record is incomplete "due to lack of proper sanctioning in Libya at the time.") eight of which took place in Malta.

== Professional career ==
Zinad made his professional debut on 30 October 2015, defeating Bogoljub Borišev via second-round technical knockout (TKO) in Attard, Malta. After signing former world champion Donny Lalonde as his manager, he captured the vacant WBF International light heavyweight title in his sixth fight, stopping Attila Palko on 24 September 2016. He defended the belt three months later, knocking out Beka Aduashvili in the German town of Bielefeld to retain. Zinad won the BBO light heavyweight title on 25 March 2017, stopping Bosnian journeyman Aleksandar Kuvac in just over a minute. He then upset Jermaine Asare two months later, knocking him out in the first round of their fight at the Motorpoint Arena in Cardiff. Zinad made his London debut on 12 October 2019, dominating Michal Gazdik in two rounds at York Hall.

After compiling a 16–0 record, Zinad beat Russian prospect Timur Nikarkhoev in Brussels on 28 March 2021 to collect the vacant IBO Inter-Continental light heavyweight title. In his next fight that August, he scored a third-round TKO over Almir Škrijelj for the vacant WBC Mediterranean light heavyweight title.

Zinad challenged WBA (Super) and IBO light-heavyweight champion Dmitry Bivol at Kingdom Arena in Riyadh, Saudi Arabia, on 1 June 2024, losing by technical knockout in the sixth round.

== Professional boxing record ==
24 fights	23 wins	1 loss
By knockout	17	1
By decision	5	0
By disqualification	1	0

No.	Result	Record	Opponent	Type	Round, time	Date	Location	Notes
25	Win	24–1	Ante Bilic	TKO	6 (8), 0:41	30 Nov 2025	York Hall, London, England	
24	Win	23–1	Haris Dzindo	KO	4 (10), 0:55	28 Feb 2025	Intercontinental Hotel, St Julian's, Malta	
23	Loss	22–1	Dmitry Bivol	TKO	6 (12), 2:06	1 Jun 2024	Kingdom Arena, Riyadh, Saudi Arabia	For WBA (Super) and IBO light-heavyweight titles
22	Win	22–0	Jerome Pampellone	MD	12	24 Apr 2024	Hordern Pavilion, Sydney, Australia	
21	Win	21–0	Mickael Diallo	UD	10	11 Mar 2023	Hall des Sports ULB Erasme, Brussels, Belgium	
20	Win	20–0	Ezequiel Maderna	UD	10	26 Jun 2022	Hall des Sports ULB Erasme, Brussels, Belgium	
19	Win	19–0	Islam Teffahi	UD	10	18 Dec 2021	Hall'O, Oberkorn, Luxembourg	
18	Win	18–0	Almir Skrijelj	TKO	3 (10), 0:57	29 Aug 2021	Claridge Events, Brussels, Belgium	Won vacant WBC Mediterranean light heavyweight title
17	Win	17–0	Timur Nikarkhoev	KO	9 (10), 1:19	28 Mar 2021	Claridge Events, Brussels, Belgium	Won vacant IBO Intercontinental light heavyweight title
16	Win	16–0	Ondrej Budera	KO	7 (8), 2:38	31 Jul 2020	Montekristo Estate, Luqa, Malta	
15	Win	15–0	Michal Gazdik	TKO	2 (8), 0:33	12 Oct 2019	York Hall, London, England	
14	Win	14–0	John Cortez	DQ	3 (6), 2:11	25 May 2019	Intercontinental Hotel, St. Julian's, Malta	
13	Win	13–0	Julio Acosta	KO	4 (6), 2:03	2 Mar 2019	Intercontinental Hotel, St. Julian's, Malta	
12	Win	12–0	Stephane Tchamba	KO	2 (8), 2:00	9 Feb 2019	Verti Music Hall, Berlin, Germany	
11	Win	11–0	Jevgenijs Andrejevs	TKO	2 (4), 0:45	3 Mar 2018	The SSE Hydro, Glasgow, Scotland	
10	Win	10–0	Tsvetozar Iliev	TKO	2 (6), 1:11	9 Dec 2017	Corradino Sport Pavilion, Paola, Malta	
9	Win	9–0	Jermaine Asare	KO	1 (8), 2:18	26 May 2017	Cardiff International Arena, Cardiff, Wales	
8	Win	8–0	Aleksandar Kuvac	TKO	1 (8), 1:08	25 Mar 2017	Corradino Sports Pavilion, Paola, Malta	
7	Win	7–0	Beka Aduashvili	KO	5 (12), 1:53	18 Dec 2016	Sportpalast, Bielefeld, Germany	Retained WBF International light heavyweight title
6	Win	6–0	Attila Palko	TKO	6 (10), 2:55	24 Sep 2016	Tabor Hall, Maribor, Slovenia	Won vacant WBF International light heavyweight title
5	Win	5–0	Norbert Szekeres	TKO	1 (4), 1:53	24 Jul 2016	Gentlemen Fight Club, Budapest, Hungary	
4	Win	4–0	Claudio Kraiem	UD	6	25 Jun 2016	Victor Tedesco Stadium, Hamrun, Malta	
3	Win	3–0	Petar Markovic	TKO	2 (4)	28 May 2016	Gymnase Frédérique Bronquard, Reims, France	
2	Win	2–0	Richard Vella	TKO	2 (6), 1:23	7 Dec 2015	Cottonera Sports Complex, Cospicua, Malta	
1	Win	1–0	Bogoljub Borisev	TKO	2 (6), 1:22	30 Oct 2015	Basketball Pavilion, Ta' Qali, Malta	
