= Boxing at the 2014 Commonwealth Games – Light flyweight =

Boxing competitions

Boxing – Light flyweight at the 2014 Commonwealth Games
- Venue: Scottish Exhibition and Conference Centre
- Dates: 26 July – 2 August 2014
- Competitors: 17 from 17 nations

Medalists
| gold medal | Paddy Barnes | Northern Ireland |
| silver medal | Devendro Singh | India |
| bronze medal | Ashley Williams | Wales |
| bronze medal | Fazil Kaggwa | Uganda |

The men's light flyweight boxing competitions at the 2014 Commonwealth Games in Glasgow, Scotland took place between 25 July and 2 August at the Scottish Exhibition and Conference Centre. Light flyweights were limited to those boxers weighing less than 49 kilograms (108.02 lbs).

Like all Commonwealth boxing events, the competition was a straight single-elimination tournament. Both semifinal losers were awarded bronze medals, so no boxers competed again after their first loss. Bouts consisted of three rounds of three minutes each, with one-minute breaks between rounds. Punches scored only if the front of the glove made full contact with the front of the head or torso of the opponent. Tree scored each bout; The winner of the bout was the boxer who won the most rounds.

== Schedule ==
All times are British Summer Time (UTC+1)

| Date | Time | Round |
|---|---|---|
| Saturday 26 July 2014 | 18:30 | Round of 32 |
| Monday 28 July 2014 | 13:00 & 18:30 | Round of 16 |
| Wednesday 30 July 2014 | 18:30 | Quarter-finals |
| Friday 1 August 2014 | 18:00 | Semi-finals |
| Saturday 2 August 2014 | 14:00 | Final |

== Medalists ==
| Gold | Paddy Barnes; Northern Ireland |
| Silver | Devendro Singh; India |
| Bronze | Ashley Williams; Wales |
| Bronze | Fazil Kaggwa; Uganda |

== Results ==
Round of 32
Inkululeko Suntele (LES) | 0
Muhamad Mohd Redzuan (MAS) | 3

Round of 16
Mohibullah (PAK)
Muhamad Mohd Redzuan (MAS) | 3
Juliano Máquina (MOZ) | 0
Ashley Williams (WAL) | 3
Alumasa Keya (KEN) | 0
Aqeel Ahmed (SCO) | 3
Madushan Gamage (SRI) | 0
Devendro Singh (IND) | 3
Mooketsi Lekgetho (BOT) | 0
Charles Keama (PNG) | 3
Paddy Barnes (NIR) | KO3
Hamadi Furahisha (TAN) | 0
Fazil Kaggwa (UGA) | 3
Bwalya Lumbwe (ZAM) | 0
Tetteh Sulemanu (GHA) | 3
Donovan Gerie (MRI) | 0

Quarterfinals
Muhamad Mohd Redzuan (MAS) | 0
Ashley Williams (WAL) | 3
Aqeel Ahmed (SCO) | 0
Devendro Singh (IND) | 3
Charles Keama (PNG) | 0
Paddy Barnes (NIR) | KO3
Fazil Kaggwa (UGA) | 2
Tetteh Sulemanu (GHA) | 1

Semifinals
Ashley Williams (WAL) | 0
Devendro Singh (IND) | 3
Paddy Barnes (NIR) | 3
Fazil Kaggwa (UGA) | 0

Final
Devendro Singh (IND) | 0
Paddy Barnes (NIR) | 3
