= Lisa Kearney =

Northern Irish judoka

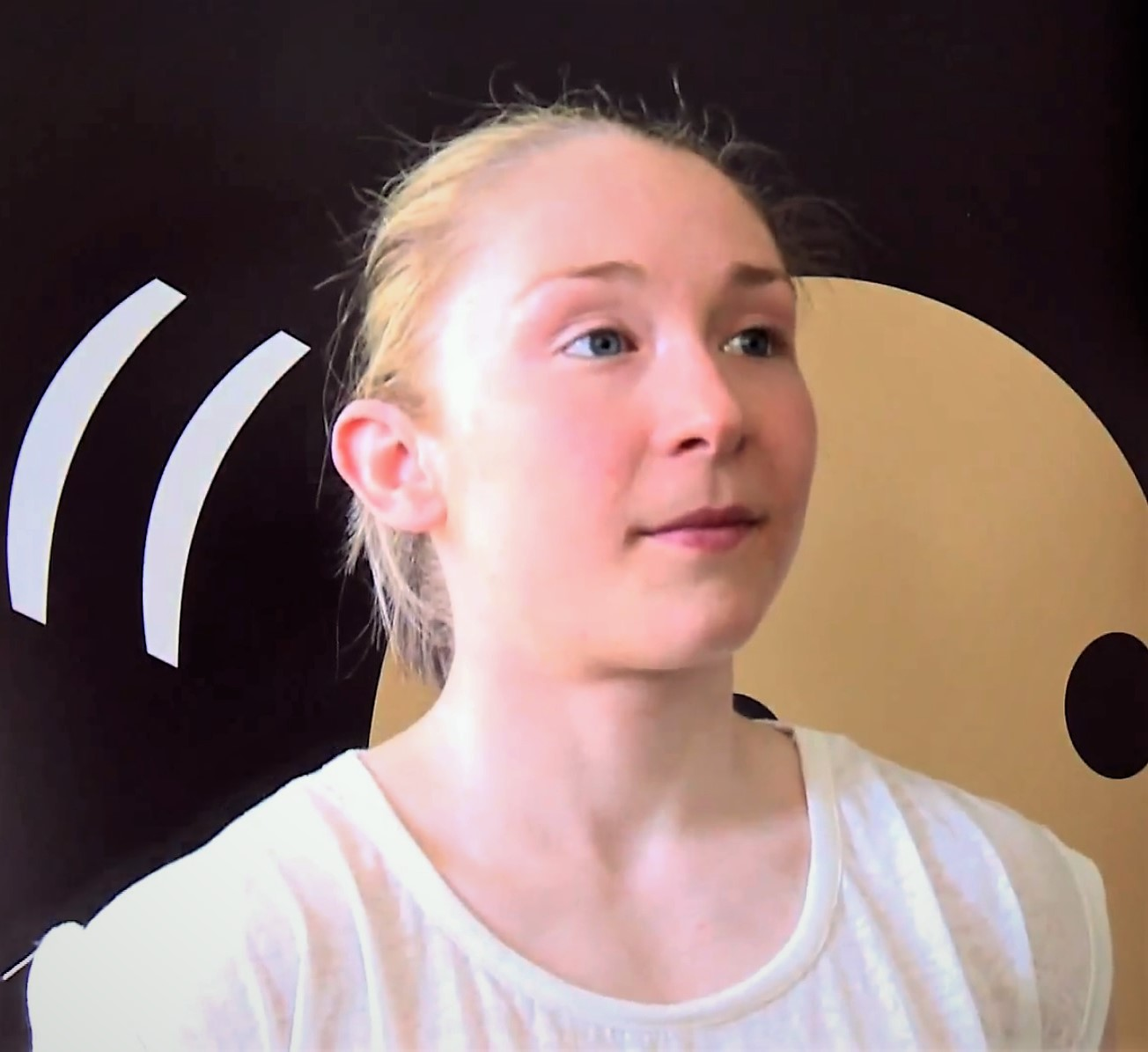
- Kearney interviewed in 2012

Personal information
- Nationality: Northern Irish
- Born: 27 May 1989 (age 37) Belfast, Northern Ireland
- Occupation: Judoka
- Height: 1.57 m (5 ft 2 in)

Sport
- Country: Ireland
- Sport: Judo
- Weight class: –48 kg, –52 kg
- Club: Yamakwai Judo Club, Belfast
- Coached by: Ciaran Ward

Achievements and titles
- Olympic Games: R16 (2012)
- World Champ.: R16 (2011)
- European Champ.: R16 (2010, 2012, 2013, 2014)
- Commonwealth Games: (bronze) (2014)
Medal record
Women's judo
Representing Ireland
IJF Grand Prix
Bronze medal – third place	2015 Samsun	–52 kg
Representing Northern Ireland
Commonwealth Games
Bronze medal – third place	2014 Glasgow	–52 kg

Profile at external databases
- IJF: 993
- JudoInside.com: 30139
- Updated on 16 December 2022

Lisa Kearney (born 27 May 1989) is a Northern Irish retired judoka, who competed in the −48 kg category. Kearney, who lives and trains in Belfast, competed in the 2012 Summer Olympics in London as a member of the Ireland Olympic team.

== Career ==
Kearney started judo at primary school in order to join her friends. Whilst still a child in 1999, she won silver in the −27 kg category of the Northern Ireland Judo Championships. In 2009, she became the first judoka representing Ireland to reach the final of a Judo World Cup. In 2012, she recovered from injury earned qualification for the Women's −48 kg judo at the 2012 Olympic Games in London by finishing in the top 14 in the International Judo Federation rankings. In doing so, she became the first female judoka representing Ireland to compete at the Olympics. However, she lost her opening match to Wu Shegun of China. The national Irish public broadcaster Raidió Teilifís Éireann was criticised for not featuring her match in their television coverage. During 2013, she missed several events due to injury but got back into competing in preparation for the Commonwealth Games. In 2014, Kearney represented Northern Ireland at the 2014 Commonwealth Games in the Women's −52 kg category and won the bronze medal with an armbar submission of Canada's Audrée Francis-Méthot, which was also Northern Ireland's first medal of the games.

She had aimed to compete at the 2016 Summer Olympics but suffered a knee injury which ruled her out of the Olympics as she was unable to take part in the qualification tournaments. She stepped out under the advice of the Sports Institute for Northern Ireland who oversaw her rehabilitation. In 2017, she announced her retirement from competitive judo. Kearney had won four World Cup gold medals.

== Personal life ==
Kearney was born on 27 May 1989 in Belfast, Northern Ireland. She studied psychology as a student at Heriot-Watt University in Edinburgh, Scotland.
