= Judo at the 2014 Commonwealth Games – Women's 52 kg =

Judo Judo – Women's 52 kg at the 2014 Commonwealth Games
- Venue: Scottish Exhibition and Conference Centre
- Date: 24 July 2014
- Competitors: 9 from 9 nations

Medalists
gold medal	Louise Renicks	Scotland
silver medal	Kelly Edwards	England
bronze medal	Lisa Kearney	Northern Ireland
bronze medal	Kalpana Thoudam	India

The women's 52 kg Judo competitions at the 2014 Commonwealth Games in Glasgow, Scotland was held on 24 July at the Scottish Exhibition and Conference Centre. Judo returned to the program, after last being competed back in 2002.

== Results ==
=== Preliminaries ===
Round of 16
K Edwards (ENG)	100
J Lewis (WAL)	000

Quarterfinals
H Trotter (AUS)	0002
Kalpana Thoudam (IND)	0023
L Renicks (SCO)	0100
A Francis-Méthot (CAN)	0003
L Kearney (NIR)	1000
S Mva (RSA)	0000
C Legentil (MRI)	0001
K Edwards (ENG)	0000

Semifinals
Kalpana Thoudam (IND)	0002
L Renicks (SCO)	0000
L Kearney (NIR)	0001
K Edwards (ENG)	0000

Gold medal match
L Renicks (SCO)	1003
K Edwards (ENG)	0004

=== Repechages ===
Repechage		Bronze medal
Hannah Trotter (AUS)	0102
Audrée Francis-Méthot (CAN)	0101	Audrée Francis-Méthot (CAN)	0002
		Lisa Kearney (NIR)	1001

Repechage		Bronze medal
Sinothando Mva (RSA)	0001
Christiane Legentil (MRI)	1000	Christiane Legentil (MRI)	0003
		Kalpana Thoudam (IND)	0002
