= Rajwinder Kaur (judoka) =

Indian judoka (born 1984)

Personal information
- Full name: Rajwinder Kaur
- Born: 2 April 1984 (age 42) Jalandhar, Punjab, India
Medal record
Women's Judo
Representing India
Commonwealth Games
Bronze medal – third place	2014 Glasgow	+78 kg
- Updated on 28 July 2014

Rajwinder Kaur (born 2 April 1984) is an Indian judoka. She won the bronze medal in the +78 kg weight class at the 2014 Commonwealth Games in Glasgow, Scotland.

In 2018, she competed in the women's +78 kg event at the Asian Games held in Jakarta, Indonesia.
