= Judo at the 2014 Commonwealth Games – Men's +100 kg =

Judo competition

Judo Judo – Men's +100 kg at the 2014 Commonwealth Games
- Venue: Scottish Exhibition and Conference Centre
- Date: 26 July 2014
- Competitors: 10 from 10 nations

Medalists
gold medal	Christopher Sherrington	Scotland
silver medal	Ruan Snyman	South Africa
bronze medal	Jake Andrewartha	Australia
bronze medal	Mark Shaw	Wales

The men's 100 kg Judo competitions at the 2014 Commonwealth Games in Glasgow, Scotland was held on 26 July at the Scottish Exhibition and Conference Centre. Judo will return to the program, after last being competed back in 2002.

== Results ==
=== Final ===
Gold medal
R Snyman (RSA)	0001
C Sherrington (SCO)	1000

=== Repechages ===
Repechage		Bronze medal
M Shaw (WAL)	1001
M Rygielski (CAN)	0002	M Shaw (WAL)	1001
		S Rosser (NZL)	0002

Repechage		Bronze medal
		J Andrewartha (AUS)	1001
P Kumar (IND)	1001	P Kumar (IND)	0000
G McNeil (NIR)	0100

=== Preliminaries ===
Round of 16
D Sua (SAM)	0004
M Shaw (WAL)	1100
P Kumar (IND)	1001
MR Abdul Razak (MAS)	0000

Quarterfinals
J Andrewartha (AUS)	1003
M Shaw (WAL)	0100
M Rygielski (CAN)	0002
R Snyman (RSA)	0001
S Rosser (NZL)	1010
P Kumar (IND)	0000
C Sherrington (SCO)	1000
G McNeill (NIR)	0000

Semifinals
J Andrewartha (AUS)	0002
R Snyman (RSA)	1000
S Rosser (NZL)	0000
C Sherrington (SCO)	1001

Gold medal match
R Snyman (RSA)	0001
C Sherrington (SCO)	1000
