= Alanna Nihell =

British boxer

Personal information
- Nationality: British
- Born: Alanna Audley-Murphy; 14 October 1985 (age 40) Belfast, Northern Ireland
- Weight: Lightweight

Boxing career
Medal record
Women's amateur boxing
Representing Northern Ireland
Commonwealth Games
| Bronze medal – third place | 2014 Glasgow | Lightweight |

Alanna Nihell (née Audley-Murphy; born 14 October 1985) is a Northern Irish amateur boxer.

Nihell competed at the 2014 Commonwealth Games where she won a bronze medal in the women's lightweight event. She also competed in 2018.

She joined the army and served in the 27th regiment of the Royal Logistic Corps where she met her husband, Chez Nihell, who is a professional boxer.
