= Annabelle Laprovidence =

Mauritian judoka

Personal information
- National team: Mauritius
- Born: August 31, 1992 (age 33)
- Occupation: Judoka

Sport
- Country: Mauritius
- Sport: Judo
- Weight class: +78 kg
Medal record
Women's judo
Representing Mauritius
African Judo Championships
Bronze medal – third place	2012 Agadir	+75 kg
Commonwealth Games
Bronze medal – third place	2014 Glasgow	+75 kg

Profile at external databases
- IJF: 10508
- JudoInside.com: 29713
- Updated on November 10, 2017

Annabelle Laprovidence (born 31 August 1992) is a Mauritian judoka, who has competed for her country internationally. She won a bronze medal in the women's +75 kg class at the 2014 Commonwealth Games in Glasgow, Scotland.

== Career ==
Annabelle Laprovidence was born on 31 August 1992, and began competing internationally for Mauritius in 2011 when she took part in the African Under-20 Championships in Antananarivo, Madagascar. She won bronze in her class at Agadir, Morocco in the 2012 African Judo Championships. Laprovidence also competed at those championships in subsequent years, but failed to win any further medals.

She competed for Mauritius at the 2014 Commonwealth Games in Glasgow, Scotland. She defeated Canada's Sophie Vaillancourt in the quarter-finals of the women's judo +75 kg weight class, but lost to Jodie Myers of England in the semi-final. In one of the two bronze medal matches, Laprovidence defeated Sachini Wewita Widanalage of Sri Lanka to win a medal. In a competition between the Judoka of Mauritius and Reunion Island the following year, Laprovidence was the only winner for her country. She was one of two medallists for her nation, and was rewarded with 15,000 Mauritian rupees by the Lord Mayor of Port Louis, Dorine Chuckowry.

== Personal life ==
Laprovidence has a son.
