= Ashley Williams (boxer) =

Wales boxer

Personal information
- Nickname: Ash-bash
- Nationality: British
- Born: 2 June 1991 (age 35) Bridgend, Wales
- Weight: 49 kg (108 lb)

Boxing career
- Stance: Orthodox
Medal record
Men's boxing
Representing Wales
Commonwealth Games
Bronze medal – third place	2014 Glasgow	Light flyweight

Ashley Williams (born 2 June 1991) is a Welsh professional boxer, fighting in the 49 kg Light flyweight category. He represented Wales at the 2014 Commonwealth Games in Glasgow. Williams currently fights professional bare knuckle with BYB Extreme.

== Amateur boxing career ==
Williams was born in Bridgend, Wales in 1991. Williams, a professional soldier, holding the rank of Lance Corporal in the 1st Battalion The Royal Welsh, he trains with the GB Army team.

In 2012 Williams was selected to represent Wales at the amateur Olympic Gloves tournament in Estonia. There he reached the final, but lost to English fighter Jack Bateson. In 2013 Williams was again selected by the Welsh Amateur Boxing Association to again represent Wales in the 49 kg category at the Popenchenko Memorial tournament in Moscow. In the semi-final he beat Basyzbev Baratov of Russia before beating his Scottish counterpart 3–0 in the final. As well as taking the gold in Moscow he was awarded the best technical boxer of the tournament. Leading into the amateur World Championships Williams was awarded the Howard Winstone Challenge Belt, an annual prize that recognises up-and-coming amateur boxers.

In May 2014 Williams was named as the light flyweight entry for the Wales boxing team for the 2014 Commonwealth Games in Glasgow. Williams was also chosen as the squad captain for the team, despite the initial line-up of eleven fighters including a defending Commonwealth champion (Sean McGoldrick) and Olympic silver medalist (Fred Evans).
