= Esther Ratugi =

Kenyan Judoka (born 1988)

Esther Akinyi Ratugi is a Kenyan Judoka. She is a prison warden at Kiambu GK prison.

== Early years and education ==
Ratugi was born in 1988 and raised in Muthurwa, Nairobi County.She was schooled at Muthurwa primary school.

At the age of 18 years old she joined the Kenya Prison Service in 2006.

== Career ==
She is the first woman to win a silver medal in Judo from the 2013 African Judo Championships. She founded the Moving World Organisation that seek to create awareness on lifestyle disease and infertility problems.
