= Kelly Edwards =

British judoka (born 1991)

Personal information
- Nationality: British
- Born: 9 January 1991 (age 35)
- Occupation: Judoka

Sport
- Country: Great Britain
- Sport: Judo
- Weight class: ‍–‍48 kg, ‍–‍52 kg

Achievements and titles
- Olympic Games: R16 (2012)
- World Champ.: R16 (2010)
- European Champ.: 7th (2010)
- Commonwealth Games: (silver) (2014)
Medal record
Women's judo
Representing Great Britain
IJF Grand Slam
Bronze medal – third place	2016 Abu Dhabi	‍–‍52 kg
IJF Grand Prix
Bronze medal – third place	2016 Zagreb	‍–‍52 kg
European Junior Championships
Bronze medal – third place	2008 Warsaw	‍–‍48 kg
Representing England
Commonwealth Games
Silver medal – second place	2014 Glasgow	‍–‍52 kg

Profile at external databases
- IJF: 2718
- JudoInside.com: 39340
- Updated on 25 November 2022

Kelly Edwards (born 9 January 1991) is a British judoka from Telford, Shropshire.

== Judo career ==
Edwards came to prominence in 2007 after she became champion of Great Britain, winning the extra-lightweight division at the British Judo Championships.

Her Great British international debut came in 2010 in Vienna, where she took seventh place in the European Judo Championships, aged only 19. In 2011, Edwards won gold in the European Cup in Málaga in the under 48kg class and also won her second British title at extra-lightweight.

In 2012, she again won gold in the British Open European Cup in Crawley. In June 2012, Edwards was chosen to represent Great Britain in the 2012 Summer Olympics in London in the under 48 kg event, she was eliminated by Tomoko Fukumi.

In 2013, she won her third British title at the heavier weight of half-lightweight before representing England at the 2014 Commonwealth Games, in Glasgow, in the under 52kg class, where she won the silver medal, losing in the final to Louise Renicks on an indirect hansoku-make (for a fourth and final shido penalty) with 3 seconds remaining on the clock.

In 2016, she won her fifth and last Senior British title.

World Cup Results Table
Date	Result	Judo Event
19 October 2013	3	European Open Rome
27 September 2014	7	European Open Tallinn
4 October 2014	5	European Open Glasgow
8 November 2014	3	African Open Port Louis
14 November 2014	2	Oceania Open Wollongong
17 January 2015	7	African Open Tunis
14 March 2015	3	African Open Casablanca
10 September 2016	3	European Open Tallinn
15 October 2016	1	European Open Glasgow
4 February 2017	7	European Open Sofia
