= Joe Fitzpatrick (boxer) =

Irish boxer

Personal information
- Nickname: The Dragon
- Nationality: Irish
- Born: 4 December 1994 (age 31) Belfast, Northern Ireland
- Height: 1.80 m (5 ft 11 in)
- Weight: Lightweight

Boxing career
- Stance: Southpaw

Boxing record
- Total fights: 11
- Wins: 10
- Win by KO: 7
- Losses: 1
Medal record
Men's amateur boxing
Representing Northern Ireland
Commonwealth Games
Silver medal – second place	2014 Glasgow	Lightweight

Joseph Fitzpatrick (born 4 December 1994) is a professional boxer from Northern Ireland. As an amateur he won a silver medal at the 2014 Commonwealth Games as a lightweight.

He currently fights bare knuckle professionally for BYB Extreme.

== Amateur career ==
=== Commonwealth Games result ===
Glasgow 2014

- Round of 16: Defeated Qhobosheane Mohlerepe (Lesotho) 2–1
- Quarter-finals: Defeated Nicholas Okongo Okoth (Kenya) 3–0
- Semi-finals: Defeated Michael Alexander (Trinidad and Tobago) 3–0
- Final: Defeated by Charlie Flynn (Scotland) 3–0

== Professional boxing record ==
11 fights	10 wins	1 loss
By knockout	7	1
By decision	3	0

No.	Result	Record	Opponent	Type	Round, time	Date	Location	Notes
12	—N/a	—N/a	TBA	—N/a	– (8)	26 Jun 2021	(United Kingdom) Belfast, Northern Ireland	
11	Loss	10–1	(Republic of Ireland) Gary Cully	TKO	1 (10), 1:38	1 Feb 2020	(United Kingdom) Ulster Hall, Belfast, Northern Ireland	For vacant Irish lightweight title
10	Win	10–0	(Spain) Iago Barros	RTD	4 (8), 3:00	12 Oct 2019	(United Kingdom) Devenish Complex, Belfast, Northern Ireland	Won vacant BUI Celtic lightweight title
9	Win	9–0	(United Kingdom) Stephen Webb	TKO	2 (6), 1:47	25 May 2019	(United Kingdom) Devenish Complex, Belfast, Northern Ireland	
8	Win	8–0	(Zambia) Mwenya Chisanga	TKO	6 (6), 0:29	21 Oct 2017	(United Kingdom) SSE Arena, Belfast, Northern Ireland	
7	Win	7–0	(Hungary) Tamas Laska	PTS	6	4 Feb 2017	(United Kingdom) Europa Hotel, Belfast, Northern Ireland	
6	Win	6–0	(Hungary) Gyula Tallosi	PTS	4	5 Nov 2016	(Republic of Ireland) National Stadium, Dublin, Ireland	
5	Win	5–0	(United Kingdom) Jordan Ellison	PTS	4	9 Jun 2016	(United Kingdom) York Hall, London, England	
4	Win	4–0	(Latvia) Ruslans Berdimuradovs	KO	1 (4), 0:47	6 Feb 2016	(United Kingdom) Europa Hotel, Belfast, Northern Ireland	
3	Win	3–0	(Hungary) Peter Mellar	TKO	4 (4), 2:20	17 Oct 2015	(United Kingdom) Europa Hotel, Belfast, Northern Ireland	
2	Win	2–0	(Hungary) Zoltan Horvath	TKO	4 (4), 1:26	1 Aug 2015	(United Kingdom) Falls Park, Belfast, Northern Ireland	
1	Win	1–0	(Hungary) Ignac Kassai	TKO	1 (4), 1:22	6 Jun 2015	(United Kingdom) Devenish Complex, Belfast, Northern Ireland	

== Professional bare knuckle boxing record ==
5 fights	3 wins	2 losses
By knockout	3	2

No.	Result	Record	Opponent	Type	Round, time	Date	Location	Notes
5	Loss	3-2	(United States) Harry Gigliotti	KO	1/5x3	12 Oct 2024	(United Kingdom) John Charles Centre for Sport, Leeds, England	BYB Super Lightweight Championship
4	Win	3–1	(United Kingdom) Jonny Jones	RTD	1/5x3	10 Aug 2024	Vale Arena, Cardiff, Wales	
3	Win	2-1	(United Kingdom) Ash Williams	TKO	2/5x2	1 Jun 2024	(United Kingdom) The O2 Arena, London, England	
2	Loss	1–1	(Wales) Liam Rees	TKO	3/5x2	29 Jul 2023 Oct 2019	(United Kingdom) The O2 Arena, London, England	For vacant BKB British Flyweight Title
1	Win	1–0	(Afghanistan) Salim Jamshidi	KO	1/3x2	21 May 2023	(United Kingdom) The O2 Arena, London, England	Debut
