= Maria Machongua =

Mozambican boxer

Personal information
- Born: January 31, 1993 (age 33) Maputo, Mozambique

Sport
- Sport: Boxing
- Weight class: Lightweight
Medal record
Women's boxing
Representing Mozambique
Commonwealth Games
| Bronze medal – third place | 2014 Glasgow | Lightweight |

Maria Machongua (born 31 January 1993) is a Mozambican boxer, who competed for her country at the 2014 Commonwealth Games in Glasgow, Scotland. In the lightweight class, she won one of the bronze medals, the first such medal anyone from her country had won in boxing.

== Career ==
Maria Machongua was born on 31 January 1993, in Maputo, Mozambique. She since took up boxing, becoming the national champion in the women's lightweight division. For the 2014 Commonwealth Games in Glasgow, Scotland, she was coached by Northern Irish trainer Harry Hawkins alongside the rest of the Mozambique boxers. Hawkins said of Machongua when he first met her, "She was completely unknown to us, but you could tell taking her on the pads that she wasn't bad - and she listened intently to what you were saying".

Machongua was one of several boxers to represent Mozambique. She needed to increase weight to compete in the 60 kilograms (130 lb) class, as she normally fights at 54 kilograms (119 lb). Each morning before weigh-ins, she needed to eat and drink in order to meet the minimum weight of 57 kilograms (126 lb) for the class. However, she was the only one to make it past the first round, defeating Lesotho's Nthabeleng Mathaha. Machongua won again in the second round, setting up a match in the semi-finals with former world champion Laishram Sarita Devi of India. She was defeated by Devi 3-0, automatically winning one of the two bronze medals in the competition. This was the first time a boxer from Mozambique had won a medal at the Games.
