= Scott Forrest (boxer) =

Scottish boxer (born 1994)

Personal information
- Nationality: Scottish
- Born: Scott Anthony Forrest; 23 August 1994 (age 32) Johannesburg, South Africa
- Height: 6 ft 2 in (188 cm)
- Weight: Cruiserweight

Boxing career
- Stance: Orthodox

Boxing record
- Total fights: 12
- Wins: 8
- Win by KO: 5
- Losses: 4

Scott Forrest (born 23 August 1994) is a British professional boxer who is affiliated with Lochend ABC. He represented Scotland at the Commonwealth Games in 2014 and 2018.

Forrest was selected to compete at the 2019 World Championships in Yekaterinburg, Russia, where he lost by split decision (4:1) to Sanjeet Kumar in the second round.
