= David Nyika =

New Zealand boxer (born 1995)

Personal information
- Born: 7 August 1995 (age 31) Hamilton, New Zealand
- Height: 6 ft 4 in (193 cm)
- Weight: Cruiserweight

Boxing career
- Reach: 79 in (201 cm)
- Stance: Orthodox

Boxing record
- Total fights: 14
- Wins: 13
- Win by KO: 10
- Losses: 1
Medal record
Men's amateur boxing
Representing New Zealand
Olympic Games
Bronze medal – third place	2020 Tokyo	Heavyweight
Commonwealth Games
Gold medal – first place	2014 Glasgow	Light heavyweight
Gold medal – first place	2018 Gold Coast	Heavyweight

David Kieran Nyika (born 7 August 1995) is a New Zealand professional boxer. As an amateur, he won a gold medal at both the 2014 and 2018 Commonwealth Games as well as competing at the 2017 and 2019 World Championships. Nyika and Sarah Hirini were the New Zealand flag bearers at the 2020 Summer Olympics. Nyika gained significant media attention after an incident during the Round of 16 at the 2020 Summer Olympics in which Moroccan boxer Youness Baalla attempted to bite Nyika's ear.

== Amateur career ==
=== 2020 Summer Olympics ===
On July 27, 2021, Nyika won a Round of 16 match against Moroccan Youness Baalla in the Tokyo 2020 Summer Olympics. In what was described by commentators as a "disgraceful act", during the third round, Baalla attempted to bite Nyika. The biting incident overshadowed the competition as New Zealand media reported that it "marred" Nyika's Olympic debut. The incident drew comparisons to Mike Tyson and Evander Holyfield's 1997 fight in which Tyson repeatedly bit Holyfield's ear.

On August 3, 2021, David Nyika won a bronze medal after being defeated in the men's heavyweight semifinal against Russian Olympic Committee's Muslim Gadzhimagomedov.

=== Commonwealth Game results ===
Glasgow 2014

- Round of 32: Defeated Luvuyo Sizani (South Africa) 2–0
- Round of 16: Defeated Scott Forrest (Scotland) 3–0
- Quarter-finals: Defeated Sumit Sangwan (India) 3–0
- Semi-finals: Defeated Sean McGlinchy (Northern Ireland) 3–0
- Final: Defeated Kennedy St-Pierre (Mauritius) 3–0

Gold Coast 2018

- Round of 16: Defeated Yakita Aska (Antigua and Barbuda) 5–0
- Quarter-finals: Defeated Christian Ndzie Tsoye (Cameroon) W/O
- Semi-finals: Defeated Cheavon Clarke (England) 5–0
- Final: Defeated Jason Whateley (Australia) 5–0

=== World Championship results ===
Hamburg 2017

- Round of 16: Defeated Igor Teziev (Germany) 5–0
- Quarter-finals: Defeated by Evgeny Tishchenko (Russia) 4–1

Yekaterinburg 2019

- Round of 32: Defeated Ahmed Hagag (Austria) 5–0
- Round of 16: Defeated by Muslim Gadzhimagomedov (Russia) 5–0

=== Olympic Games results ===
Tokyo 2020

- Round of 16: Defeated Youness Baalla (Morocco) 5-0
- Quarter-finals: Defeated Uladzislau Smiahlikau (Belarus) 5-0
- Semi-finals: Defeated by Muslim Gadzhimagomedov (Russia) 4–1

== Professional career ==
On 26 January 2021, it was announced that Nyika would make his professional debut against Jesse Maio on the undercard of Joseph Parker vs. Junior Fa at Spark Arena on 27 February 2021. The bout would end in strange fashion as following a big right hand landed by Nyika that floored Maio, Maio would protest that the punch landed behind the head. Despite protestations from Maio that he had been hit behind the head, Nyika was awarded the win just 29 seconds into the opening round.

Following his bronze medal winning performance at the 2020 Summer Olympics Nyika would relocate to Morecambe, England in preparation for his second pro bout and would begin training under former WBO middleweight champion Andy Lee and would train alongside reigning WBC heavyweight champion Tyson Fury and former WBO heavyweight champion Joseph Parker. He would make his UK debut against Frenchman Anthony Carpin on the undercard of the rematch between Joseph Parker vs. Dereck Chisora at AO Arena in Manchester on 18 December 2021. Nyika would progress to 2–0 dominating Carpin throughout the initial three minutes and when the bell rang to end the opening round, Carpin would retire on his stool complaining about a left elbow injury.

Nyika's next outing would be involved in a crowd-pleasing five-round scrap with Karim Maatalla on the undercard of George Kambosos Jr. vs. Devin Haney on 5 June 2022. Nyika showcased some of the skills that helped him win Olympic bronze and two Commonwealth Games golds as he out-fought the game Maatalla over five rounds to win 49–46, 49–46 and 48–47 on the judges scorecards. Speaking on his performance after the fight, Nyika said, "Realistically, I'd give it like a C−, It was exactly what I needed. I needed some tough opposition, someone who can actually take the shots as well as give them back."

Nyika challenged IBF and The Ring cruiserweight champion Jai Opetaia at the Convention and Exhibition Centre on the Gold Coast in Australia on 8 January 2025, but lost the fight by knockout in the fourth round.

== Professional boxing record ==
14 fights	13 wins	1 loss
By knockout	10	1
By decision	3	0

No.	Result	Record	Opponent	Type	Round	Date	Location	Notes
14	Win	13–1	Floyd Masson	UD	12	8 Aug 2026	Eventfinda Stadium, North Shore, New Zealand	
13	Win	12–1	Wuzhati Nuerlang	UD	10	13 Dec 2025	Gatton Shire Hall, Gatton, Queensland, Australia	
12	Win	11–1	Nikolas Charalampous	RTD	5 (8), 3:00	16 July 2025	Qudos Bank Arena, Sydney Olympic Park, New South Wales, Australia	
11	Loss	10–1	Jai Opetaia	KO	4 (12), 2:17	8 Jan 2025	Convention & Exhibition Centre, Gold Coast, Queensland, Australia	For IBF and The Ring cruiserweight titles
10	Win	10–0	Tommy Karpency	TKO	3 (10), 1:13	15 Sep 2024	Viaduct Events Centre, Auckland, New Zealand	Retained IBF Inter-Continental cruiserweight title; Won vacant WBO Asia Pacific cruiserweight title
9	Win	9–0	Michael Seitz	TKO	4 (10), 2:45	18 May 2024	Kingdom Arena, Riyadh, Saudi Arabia	Won vacant IBF Inter-Continental cruiserweight title
8	Win	8–0	Robert Berridge	TKO	3 (8), 1:00	3 Nov 2023	Gatton Shire Hall, Gatton, Queensland, Australia	
7	Win	7–0	Waikato Falefehi	TKO	2 (8), 2:14	28 Jul 2023	Gatton Shire Hall, Gatton, Queensland, Australia	
6	Win	6–0	Louis Marsters	TKO	4 (5), 2:22	24 May 2023	Margaret Court Arena, Melbourne, Victoria, Australia	
5	Win	5–0	Titi Motusaga	KO	2 (6), 2:35	16 Oct 2022	Rod Laver Arena, Melbourne, Victoria, Australia	
4	Win	4–0	Louis Marsters	TKO	2 (4), 0:59	2 Jul 2022	Convention & Exhibition Centre, Gold Coast, Queensland, Australia	
3	Win	3–0	Karim Maatalla	UD	5	5 Jun 2022	Marvel Stadium, Melbourne, Victoria, Australia	
2	Win	2–0	Anthony Carpin	RTD	1 (4), 3:00	18 Dec 2021	AO Arena, Manchester, England	
1	Win	1–0	Jesse Maio	KO	1 (6), 0:29	27 Feb 2021	Spark Arena, Auckland, New Zealand	

Olympic Games
Preceded by Peter Burling	Flagbearer for New Zealand; Tokyo 2020; With: Sarah Hirini	Succeeded by Jo Aleh & Aaron Gate
