= Chris Sherrington =

Scottish judoka

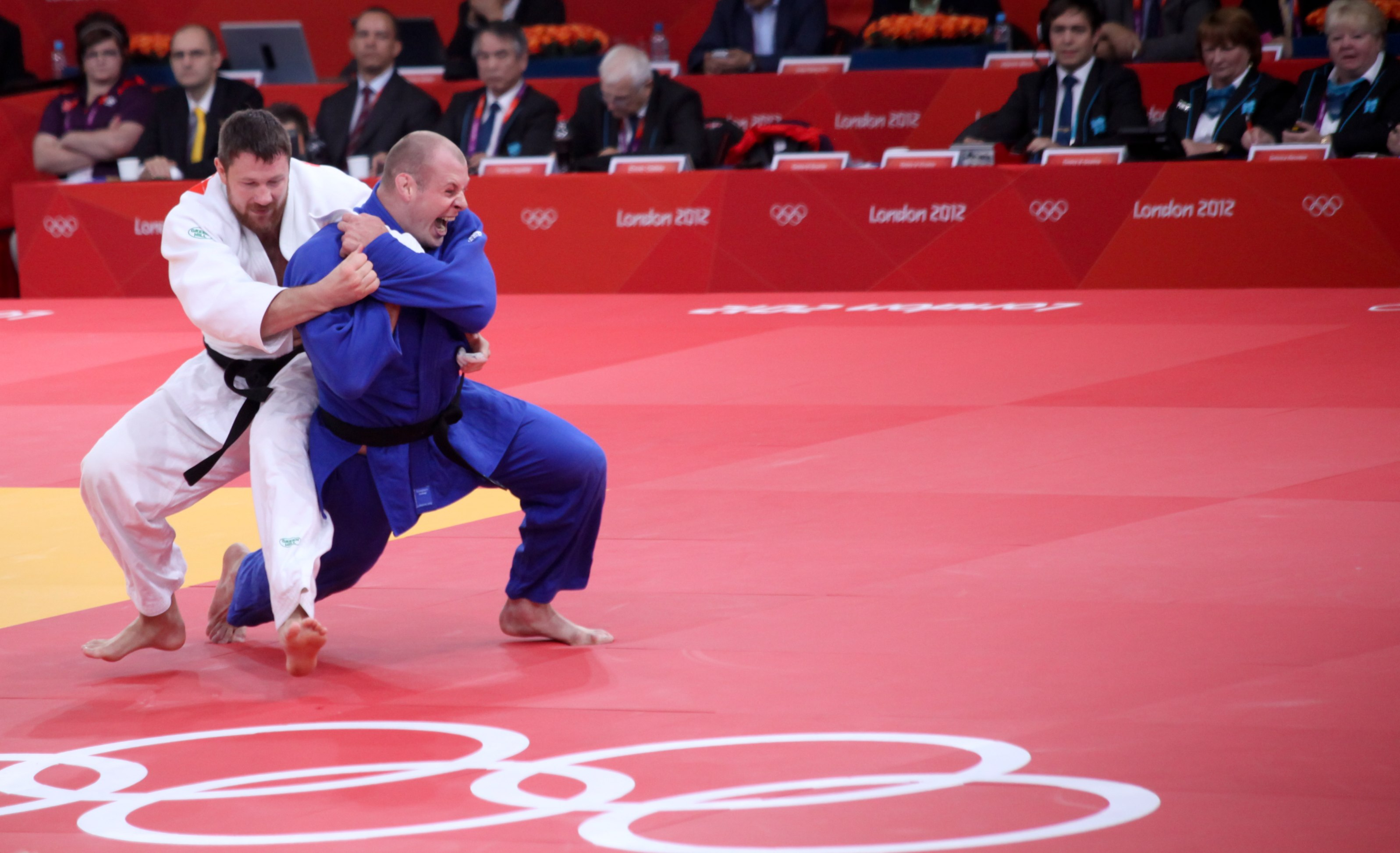
- Alexander Mikhaylin (left) with Sherrington at the 2012 London Olympics

Personal information
- Full name: Christopher David Sherrington
- Born: 21 October 1983 (age 42) Ormskirk, England
- Occupation: Judoka

Sport
- Country: Great Britain
- Sport: Judo
- Weight class: +100 kg
- Rank: 1st dan black belt

Achievements and titles
- Olympic Games: R16 (2012)
- World Champ.: R32 (2011)
- European Champ.: R32 (2011, 2012, 2013)
- Commonwealth Games: (gold) (2014)
Medal record
Men's judo
Representing Great Britain
IJF Grand Prix
Silver medal – second place	2014 Havana	+100 kg
Bronze medal – third place	2013 Samsun	+100 kg
Representing Scotland
Commonwealth Games
Gold medal – first place	2014 Glasgow	+100 kg

Profile at external databases
- IJF: 2720
- JudoInside.com: 36099
- Updated on 26 December 2022

Christopher David Sherrington (born 21 October 1983 in Ormskirk, England) is a British judoka. He competed at the 2012 Summer Olympics in the +100 kg event. He is a black belt.

== Judo career ==
Sherrington born in Ormskirk, England came to prominence when he became champion of Great Britain, winning the heavyweight division at the British Judo Championships in 2005. He repeated the success three years later in 2008.

In 2011 Sherrington won a Samoa World Cup.

In 2012, he was selected to represent Great Britain at the 2012 Olympic Games in London. Competing in the men's +100 kg category he lost his second round match to eventual silver medallist Alexander Mikhaylin. The following year Sherrington secured his third British heavyweight title. In 2014, he won the gold medal for Scotland at the 2014 Commonwealth Games in heavyweight division. He defeated South African Ruan Snyman in the final.

In 2019, Sherrington won a fourth British Championship title.

== Personal life ==
Sherrington is a Royal Marines Commando.
