= Louise Renicks =

Scottish judoka (born 1982)

Personal information
- Born: 11 September 1982 (age 43) Coatbridge, Scotland

Sport
- Country: Scotland
- Sport: Judo
- Event: Women's 52 kg
Medal record
Representing Scotland
Women's Judo
Commonwealth Games
Gold medal – first place	2014 Glasgow	Women's 52 kg
- Updated on 7 September 2014

Louise Renicks (born 11 September 1982) is a Scottish judoka. She competed for Scotland in the women's 52 kg event at the 2014 Commonwealth Games where she won a gold medal. Her younger sister Kimberley is also a judoka who won a gold medal at the same Games.
