= Nathan Thorley =

Welsh boxer

Personal information
- Nickname: Thunder
- Nationality: Welsh
- Born: 18 April 1993 (age 33) Cardiff, Wales
- Height: 6 ft 4 in (193 cm)
- Weight: Light-heavyweight; Cruiserweight

Boxing career

Boxing record
- Total fights: 15
- Wins: 14
- Win by KO: 6
- Losses: 1
Medal record
Men's boxing
Representing Wales
Commonwealth Games
Bronze medal – third place	2014 Glasgow	Light-heavyweight

Nathan Thorley (born 18 April 1993) is former Welsh professional boxer who challenged for the Commonwealth cruiserweight title in August 2020. As an amateur he competed for Wales in the light-heavyweight category at the 2014 Commonwealth Games where he won a bronze medal.

He turned professional in 2015, winning the Welsh light-heavyweight title two years later by defeating Jermaine Asare.

== Career ==
=== Amateur ===
Born in Cardiff, Thorley took up boxing as a child between the age of nine or ten after joining a boxing gym managed by Pat Thomas in the Fairwater area. He later fought at St. Joseph's and Splott Amateur Boxing Club. Thorley was chosen to represent Wales at the 2014 Commonwealth Games in Glasgow. He had initially not been selected for the squad before replacing Jamie Evans who pulled out of the squad. He won a bronze medal at the games after suffering a defeat to Kennedy St-Pierre in the semi-finals when his corner threw in the towel in the third round.

As an amateur, Thorley recorded 70 victories.

=== Professional ===
Thorley turned professional in 2015, winning his debut bout against Polish fighter Krystian Nadolski by KO. Having won his first eight bouts as a professional, Thorley gained a title bout for the Welsh Light-heavyweight title against fellow Commonwealth bronze medalist Jermaine Asare at Merthyr Leisure Centre. Thorley knocked Adare down in the second round with a right hand which prompted the referee to end the bout, awarding Thorley a TKO victory.

On 8 August 2020 Thorley challenged Chris Billam-Smith for the Commonwealth cruiserweight title.

== Professional boxing record ==
15 fights	14 wins	1 loss
By knockout	6	1
By decision	8	0

No.	Result	Record	Opponent	Type	Round, time	Date	Location	Notes
15	Loss	14–1	(England) Chris Billam-Smith	TKO	2 (12), 2:05	7 Aug 2020	Matchroom HQ Garden, Brentwood, England	For Commonwealth cruiserweight title
14	Win	14–0	(Lithuania) Dmitrij Kalinovskij	PTS	4	14 Dec 2019	York Hall, London, England	
13	Win	13–0	(Lithuania) Remigijus Ziausys	PTS	6	27 Sep 2019	York Hall, London, England	
12	Win	12–0	(Latvia) Jevgeņijs Andrejevs	TKO	2 (6), 2:52	27 Oct 2018	Newport Centre, Newport, Wales	
11	Win	11–0	(Switzerland) Emmanuel Moussinga	PTS	4	4 Aug 2018	Ice Arena Wales, Cardiff, Wales	
10	Win	10–0	(England) Adam Jones	PTS	8	14 Apr 2018	Ice Arena Wales, Cardiff, Wales	
9	Win	9–0	(Wales) Jermaine Asare	TKO	2 (10), 2:21	15 Dec 2017	Merthyr Leisure Centre, Metrthyr Tydfil, Wales	Won vacant Welsh light heavyweight title
8	Win	8–0	(Lithuania) Imantas Davidaitis	PTS	4	14 Oct 2017	Merthyr Leisure Centre, Merthyr Tydfil, Wales	
7	Win	7–0	(Czech Republic) Stanislav Eschner	TKO	3 (6), 1:19	26 May 2017	Cardiff International Arena, Cardiff, Wales	
6	Win	6–0	(Wales) Jamie Ambler	KO	2 (6), 2:02	22 Apr 2017	Leisure Centre, Ebbw Vale, Wales	
5	Win	5–0	(England) Elvis Dube	PTS	4	14 May 2016	Ice Arena Wales, Cardiff, Wales	
4	Win	4–0	(Latvia) Jevgeņijs Andrejevs	PTS	4	11 Mar 2016	Newport Centre, Newport, Wales	
3	Win	3–0	(England) Dan Foster	TKO	4 (4), 1:28	30 Oct 2015	Newport Centre, Newport, Wales	
2	Win	2–0	(Lithuania) Rolandas Čėsna	PTS	4	19 Jun 2015	Newport Centre, Newport Wales	
1	Win	1–0	(Poland) Krystian Nadolski	KO	1 (4), 2:23	13 Mar 2015	Newport Centre, Newport, Wales	
