= Taoriba Biniati =

Kiribati boxer

Personal information
- Born: 1 November 1995 Tabiteuea, Kiribati
- Height: 5 ft 4 in (1.64 m)
- Weight: Lightweight (57 kg)

Boxing career

Taoriba Biniati (born 1 November 1995) is an I-Kiribati boxer.

Biniati comes from Tabiteuea, an atoll in the Gilbert Islands, Kiribati, south of Tarawa. She took up boxing after Derek Andrewartha, a former police officer from Hampshire, England, advertised for a female boxer to join his club with the aim of competing at the 2014 Commonwealth Games. She is coached by Tarieta Ruata, who represented Kiribati at the 2010 Commonwealth Games in Delhi. The club's only equipment was a single punchbag which they hung from a breadfruit tree.

In December 2013 Biniati accompanied the Queen's Baton Relay as it passed through Kiribati on the journey to Glasgow.

== 2014 Commonwealth Games ==
Biniati was selected to compete for Kiribati at the 2014 Commonwealth Games held in Glasgow, Scotland, from 23 July to 3 August 2014, in the women's lightweight division. She was the first female boxer from her nation to compete at the Games. Prior to competing at the Commonwealth Games she had never competed in a ring or against another woman; she had only sparred with male boxers in Kiribati and Glasgow. Her funding for the Games was provided by the Kiribati government and the Commonwealth Games Federation.

In Glasgow she trained at a gym belonging to the promoter Alex Morrison; because she had no boots Morrison sent an employee out to purchase her a pair. The day before the official weigh-in for her competition Biniati was two pounds under the minimum weight limit for the lightweight division but she managed to put on the additional required weight by using protein drinks.

In her first bout of the competition she faced Isabelle Ratna of Mauritius and lost on points in a unanimous judge's decision after four rounds.
