= Kalpana Devi Thoudam =

Indian judoka (born 1989)

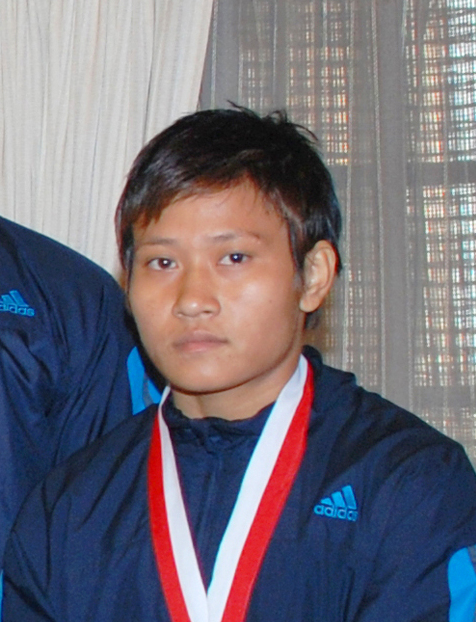
- Thoudam in New Delhi, 14 January 2010

Personal information
- Born: 24 December 1989 (age 36) Imphal East, Manipur, India
- Occupation: Judoka

Sport
- Country: India
- Sport: Judo
- Weight class: –52 kg

Achievements and titles
- World Champ.: R32 (2009, 2011, 2017)
- Asian Champ.: 5th (2014)
- Commonwealth Games: (bronze) (2014)
Medal record
Women's judo
Representing India
IJF Grand Prix
Bronze medal – third place	2013 Tashkent	–52 kg
Asian Junior Championships
Gold medal – first place	2008 Sana'a	–57 kg
Silver medal – second place	2007 Hyderabad	–52 kg
Commonwealth Games
Bronze medal – third place	2014 Glasgow	–52 kg
South Asian Games
Bronze medal – third place	2016 Guhwati	–52 kg

Profile at external databases
- IJF: 350
- JudoInside.com: 50359
- Updated on 26 December 2022

Kalpana Devi Thoudam (born 24 December 1989) is an Indian judoka, born in Imphal East, Manipur. She won the bronze medal in the women's 52 kg weight class at the 2014 Commonwealth Games in Glasgow, Scotland.

== Career ==
In her career as a judoka, Thoudam won a silver at the sub-junior national championship in Guwahati in 1998. She then won four gold medals at the junior national championships and one gold at junior Asian judo championship. In 2007, she placed second at the Asian U20 Championships, held in Hyderabad. In 2010, she won a bronze at the International Judo Federation World Cup in Tashkent. In the same year, she won a gold medal at the Commonwealth Judo Championships in Singapore. In 2013, she became the first Indian to win a medal at the IJF Grand Prix in Tashkent, Uzbekistan, when she won a bronze medal. She defeated Zarifa Sultanova of Uzbekistan, but lost to Israeli Gili Cohen. In the repechage round she defeated Raquel Silva from Brazil. Additionally, she has served as the Head Constable of the Indo-Tibetan Border Police.

In the 2014 Commonwealth Games, she won bronze in the 52 kg weight class. Shealso won gold medals at the Indian Championships in 2017 and 2018, held in Chennai and Jammu, respectively.
