= Fazil Kaggwa =

Ugandan boxer (born 1995)

Personal information
- Full name: Fazil Juma Kaggwa
- Nationality: Ugandan
- Born: 9 May 1995 (age 31) Naguru, Uganda

Sport
- Sport: Boxing
- Weight class: Light flyweight
Medal record
Men's amateur boxing
Representing Uganda
Commonwealth Games
Bronze medal – third place	2014 Glasgow	Light flyweight
African Championships
Bronze medal – third place	2015 Casablanca	Light flyweight

Fazil Juma Kaggwa (born 9 May 1995) is a Ugandan boxer. He competed in the light flyweight category at the 2014 Commonwealth Games where he won a bronze medal.
