= Boxing at the 2014 Commonwealth Games – Lightweight =

Boxing competitions

Boxing – Lightweight at the 2014 Commonwealth Games
- Venue: Scottish Exhibition and Conference Centre
- Dates: 26 July – 2 August 2014
- Competitors: 25 from 25 nations

Medalists
gold medal	Charlie Flynn	Scotland
silver medal	Joe Fitzpatrick	Northern Ireland
bronze medal	Joseph Cordina	Wales
bronze medal	Michael Alexander	Trinidad and Tobago

The lightweight boxing competition at the 2014 Commonwealth Games in Glasgow, Scotland was held from 26 July to 2 August at the Scottish Exhibition and Conference Centre. Lightweights were limited to those boxers weighing less than 60 kilograms (132.28 lbs).

Like all Commonwealth boxing events, the competition was a straight single-elimination tournament. Both semifinal losers were awarded bronze medals, so no boxers competed again after a loss. Bouts consisted of three rounds of three minutes each, with one-minute breaks between rounds. Punches scored only if the front of the glove made full contact with the front of the head or torso of the opponent. Five judges scored each bout; three of the judges had to signal a scoring punch within one second for the punch to score. The winner of the bout was the boxer who scored the most valid punches.

== Schedule ==
All times are British Summer Time (UTC+1)

Date	Time	Round
Saturday 26 July 2014	13:00	Round of 32
Sunday 27 July 2014	13:20 & 18:50	Round of 16
Tuesday 29 July 2014	18:30	Quarter-finals
Friday 1 August 2014	18:40	Semi-finals
Saturday 2 August 2014	14:15	Final

== Medalists ==
Gold	Charlie Flynn; Scotland
Silver	Joe Fitzpatrick; Northern Ireland
Bronze	Joseph Cordina; Wales
Bronze	Michael Alexander; Trinidad and Tobago

== Results ==
Round of 32
Joseph Cordina (WAL)	2
Pat McCormack (ENG)	1
Sura Chakma (BAN)	0
Chad Milnes (NZL)	3
Kaisa Ioane (SAM)	0
Lazarus Shaningwa (NAM)	3
Muhammad Alnazirul Othman (MAS)	0
Nick Cooney (AUS)	3
Jessie Lartey (GHA)	WO
Nassar Mafuru Mafuru (TAN)
Oto Joseph (NGR)	0
Michael Alexander (TRI)	3
Tom Boga (PNG)	0
Andrique Allisop (SEY)	3
Qhobosheane Mohlerepe (LES)	3
Dinindu Saparamadu (SRI)	0
John Colin (MRI)	0
Nicholas Okongo Okoth (KEN)	3

Round of 16
David Gauthier (CAN)	0
Joseph Cordina (WAL)	3
Chad Milnes (NZL)	3
Lazarus Shaningwa (NAM)	0
Charlie Flynn (SCO)	3
Nick Cooney (AUS)	0
Jessie Lartey (GHA)	3
Oliver Nshingiro (RWA)	0
Ali Ahmad (PAK)	0
Michael Alexander (TRI)	3
Andrique Allisop (SEY)	0
Cobia Breedy (BAR)	3
Joe Fitzpatrick (NIR)	2
Qhobosheane Mohlerepe (LES)	1
Nicholas Okongo Okoth (KEN)	3
Alfonse Deireragea (NRU)	0

Quarterfinals
Joseph Cordina (WAL)	3
Chad Milnes (NZL)	0
Charlie Flynn (SCO)	3
Jessie Lartey (GHA)	0
Michael Alexander (TRI)	3
Cobia Breedy (BAR)	0
Joe Fitzpatrick (NIR)	3
Nicholas Okongo Okoth (KEN)	0

Semifinals
Joseph Cordina (WAL)	0
Charlie Flynn (SCO)	3
Michael Alexander (TRI)	0
Joe Fitzpatrick (NIR)	3

Final
Charlie Flynn (SCO)	3
Joe Fitzpatrick (NIR)	0
