= Jodie Myers =

British judoka (born 1995)

Personal information
- Nationality: British
- Born: 23 March 1995 (age 31) Liverpool, England
- Occupation: Judoka
- Height: 5 ft 8 in (173 cm)
- Weight: 100 kg (220 lb)

Sport
- Country: England
- Sport: Judo
- Weight class: Women's +78 kg
Medal record
Women's judo
Representing United Kingdom
European U23 Championships
Bronze medal – third place	2016 Tel Aviv	+78 kg
European Junior Championships
Gold medal – first place	2014 Bucharest	+78 kg
Representing England
Commonwealth Games
Silver medal – second place	2014 Glasgow	+78 kg

Profile at external databases
- IJF: 7851
- JudoInside.com: 66151
- Updated on 14 September 2014

Jodie Myers (born 23 March 1995) is a British judoka. She competed for England in the women's +78 kg event at the 2014 Commonwealth Games where she won a silver medal. Jodie went on to win a gold medal in the same category at the 2014 Junior European Judo Championships in Bucharest.
