= Charlie Flynn =

Scottish boxer

Personal information
- Nickname: The Mailman
- Nationality: Scotland
- Born: Charles Flynn; 6 November 1993 (age 32) Lanark, Lanarkshire, Scotland,
- Height: 5 ft 7 in (170 cm)
- Weight: Lightweight

Boxing career

Boxing record
- Total fights: 12
- Wins: 10
- Win by KO: 1
- Losses: 0
- Draws: 2
- No contests: 0
Medal record
Men's Boxing
Representing Scotland
Commonwealth Games
Gold medal – first place	2014 Glasgow	Lightweight
Commonwealth Youth Games
Silver medal – second place	2011 Isle of Man	Lightweight
GB Championships
Gold medal – first place	2012 London	Lightweight

Charles "Mailman" Flynn (born 6 November 1993, Lanark) is a professional boxer and Commonwealth gold medalist from Scotland.

== Amateur career ==
Flynn competed in the men's lightweight division at the 2014 Commonwealth Games where he won the gold medal.

Flynn was also a lightweight boxing competitor in the 2011 Commonwealth Youth Games where he won the silver medal. He was the winner of the Editor's Award at the Sunday Mail Scottish Sports Awards 2014.

In the weeks following his Commonwealth Games success he gave an inspirational speech to the Scotland Rowing Team before the 2014 Commonwealth Rowing Championships.

== Professional career ==
Flynn made his professional debut against Ibrar Riyaz on 14 December 2014 at a packed Thistle Hotel in Glasgow. Flynn claimed a 40-36 points win against the Englishman. The victory came four-and-a-half months after Flynn enjoyed success at Glasgow 2014.

== Professional record ==
10 Wins (1 knockout, 9 decisions), 0 Losses, 2 Draws
Result	Record	Opponent	Type	Round, Time	Date	Location	Notes
Draw	10-0-2	(United Kingdom) Ryan Collins	TD	4	3 March 2018	The Hydro, Glasgow, Scotland	For vacant Celtic lightweight title
Win	10-0-1	(United Kingdom) Fonz Alexander	PTS	6	10 December 2017	Double Tree by Hilton Hotel, Glasgow, Scotland	
Win	9-0-1	(United Kingdom) Liam Richards	PTS	6	7 October 2017	Manchester Arena, Manchester, England	
Draw	8-0-1	(United Kingdom) Ryan Collins	TD	3	15 Apr 2017	The Hydro, Glasgow, Scotland	For vacant Celtic lightweight title
Win	8–0	(Cameroon) Abdon Cesar	PTS	4	28 May 2016	The Hydro, Glasgow, Scotland	
Win	7–0	(United Kingdom) Jordan Ellison	PTS	6	18 March 2016	The Glasgow City Hotel, Glasgow, Scotland	
Win	6–0	(United Kingdom) Lee Connelly	PTS	6	13 December 2015	The Glasgow City Hotel, Glasgow, Scotland	
Win	5–0	(Poland) Sylwester Walczak	TKO	5 (6), 3:00	4 September 2015	Thistle Hotel, Glasgow, Scotland	
Win	4–0	(United Kingdom) Dan Carr	PTS	4	1 August 2015	(England) Craven Park Stadium, Hull, Yorkshire	
Win	3–0	(United Kingdom) Qasim Hussain	PTS	4	22 May 2015	Thistle Hotel, Glasgow, Scotland	
Win	2–0	(United Kingdom) Andy Harris	PTS	4	4 April 2015	(England) Metro Radio Arena, Newcastle upon Tyne, Tyne and Wear	
Win	1–0	(United Kingdom) Ibrar Riyaz	PTS	4	14 December 2014	Thistle Hotel, Glasgow, Scotland	Professional debut

== Personal life ==
Flynn is a native of Newarthill, Lanarkshire.

During the Commonwealth Games, Flynn was quoted post fight as saying "the Mailman delivers", referencing the fact that he worked in the sorting office of the Royal Mail and has used the nickname "The Mailman" since, having it displayed on his fight shorts.

In January 2018, Flynn announced his engagement to his partner Amber Farquhar.
