= Shelley Watts =

Australian boxer (born 1987)

Personal information
- Full name: Shelley Marie Watts
- Nationality: Australia
- Born: 10 August 1987 (age 39) Port Macquarie, New South Wales, Australia
- Height: 164 cm (5 ft 5 in)
- Weight: 60 kg (132 lb) lightweight division

Sport
- Sport: Boxing
- Weight class: Lightweight
Medal record
Women's Boxing
Representing Australia
Commonwealth Games
Gold medal – first place	2014 Glasgow	Lightweight

Shelley Marie Watts (born 10 August 1987) is an Australian amateur boxer. Watts competed in the women's lightweight division at the 2014 Commonwealth Games where she won the gold medal. She was also a competitor in the 2012 AIBA Women's World Boxing Championships.

Watts qualified for the Rio 2016 Olympic Games, on 31 March 2016 by making the final of the 2016 Asian and Oceanian Olympic qualifying event, only to be eliminated in her first fight by Italian teenager Irma Testa.

Watts is now a lawyer. She began her law degree three years before starting boxing.

== Personal life ==
Watts is a supporter of the Australian football team South Sydney Rabbitohs.
