= Sean McGlinchy =

Irish boxer (born 1992)

Personal information
- Nationality: Northern Ireland
- Born: 29 April 1992 (age 34) Derry, Northern Ireland

Sport
- Sport: Boxing
- Weight class: Light heavyweight
Medal record
Men's amateur boxing
Representing Northern Ireland
Commonwealth Games
Bronze medal – third place	2014 Glasgow	Light heavy

Sean McGlinchy (born 29 April 1992 in Derry) is an amateur boxer from Northern Ireland. He competed in the men's light-heavyweight division at the 2014 Commonwealth Games where he won a bronze medal.
