= Singapore at the 2014 Commonwealth Games =

- CG code: SGP
- CGA: Singapore National Olympic Council
- Website: www.singaporeolympics.com

in Glasgow, Scotland
- Flag bearer: Lim Heem Wei
- Medals Ranked 11th: Gold 8 Silver 5 Bronze 4 Total 17

Commonwealth Games appearances (overview)
- 1958; 1962; 1966; 1970; 1974; 1978; 1982; 1986; 1990; 1994; 1998; 2002; 2006; 2010; 2014; 2018; 2022; 2026; 2030

Singapore competed in the 2014 Commonwealth Games in Glasgow, Scotland from 23 July to 3 August 2014.

== Media coverage ==
Singaporean public broadcasting conglomerate Mediacorp held the broadcast rights of the 2014 Commonwealth Games in the country.

== Medallists ==
Medal	Name	Sport	Event	Date
Gold	Teo Shun Xie	Shooting	Women's 10 m air pistol	25 July
Gold	Feng Tianwei; Isabelle Li; Lin Ye; Yu Mengyu; Zhou Yihan	Table tennis	Women's team	27 July
Gold	Clarence Chew; Gao Ning; Li Hu; Yang Zi; Zhan Jian	Table tennis	Men's team	28 July
Gold	Jasmine Ser	Shooting	Women's 50 m rifle three positions	29 July
Gold	Feng Tianwei	Table tennis	Women's singles	1 August
Gold	Gao Ning; Li Hu	Table tennis	Men's doubles	1 August
Gold	Feng Tianwei; Yu Mengyu	Table tennis	Women's doubles	2 August
Gold	Zhan Jian	Table tennis	Men's singles	2 August
Silver	Joseph Schooling	Swimming	Men's 100 m butterfly	28 July
Silver	Yu Mengyu	Table tennis	Women's singles	1 August
Silver	Gao Ning	Table tennis	Men's singles	2 August
Silver	Derek Wong	Badminton	Men's singles	3 August
Silver	Chayut Triyachart; Danny Bawa Chrisnanta	Badminton	Men's doubles	3 August
Bronze	Chayut Triyachart; Danny Bawa Chrisnanta; Derek Wong; Fu Mingtian; Huang Chao; Liang Xiaoyu; Shinta Mulia Sari; Terry Hee; Vanessa Neo Yu Yan; Yao Lei	Badminton	Mixed team	28 July
Bronze	Hoe Wah Toon	Gymnastics	Men's vault	1 August
Bronze	Lin Ye	Table tennis	Women's singles	1 August
Bronze	Yang Zi; Zhan Jian	Table tennis	Men's doubles	1 August

Medals by sport
Sport	1st place, gold medalist(s)	2nd place, silver medalist(s)	3rd place, bronze medalist(s)	Total
Table tennis	6	2	2	10
Shooting	2	0	0	2
Badminton	0	2	1	3
Swimming	0	1	0	1
Gymnastics	0	0	1	1
Athletics	0	0	0	0
Weightlifting	0	0	0	0
Boxing	Did not participate			
Cycling	Did not participate			
Diving	Did not participate			
Hockey	Did not participate			
Judo	Did not participate			
Lawn bowls	Did not participate			
Netball	Did not participate			
Rugby sevens	Did not participate			
Squash	Did not participate			
Triathlon	Did not participate			
Wrestling	Did not participate			
Total	8	5	4	17

Medals by day
Date	1st place, gold medalist(s)	2nd place, silver medalist(s)	3rd place, bronze medalist(s)	Total
24 July	0	0	0	0
25 July	1	0	0	1
26 July	0	0	0	0
27 July	1	0	0	1
28 July	1	1	1	3
29 July	1	0	0	1
30 July	0	0	0	0
31 July	0	0	0	0
1 August	2	1	3	6
2 August	2	1	0	3
3 August	0	2	0	0
Total	8	5	4	17

Multiple medalists
Name	Sport	1st place, gold medalist(s)	2nd place, silver medalist(s)	3rd place, bronze medalist(s)	Total
Feng Tianwei	Table tennis	3	0	0	3
Gao Ning	Table tennis	2	1	0	3
Yu Mengyu	Table tennis	2	1	0	3
Zhan Jian	Table tennis	2	0	1	3
Li Hu	Table tennis	2	0	0	2
Lin Ye	Table tennis	1	0	1	2
Yang Zi	Table tennis	1	0	1	2
Chayut Triyachart	Badminton	0	1	1	2
Danny Bawa Chrisnanta	Badminton	0	1	1	2
Derek Wong	Badminton	0	1	1	2

== Athletics ==
Men
Track events

Athlete	Event	Heat		Semifinal		Final	
Athlete	Event	Result	Rank	Result	Rank	Result	Rank
Calvin Kang	100 m	10.77	41	Did not advance			
Gary Yeo	100 m	10.82	45	Did not advance			
Muhammad Elfi Mustapa	100 m	10.94	53	Did not advance			
Lee Chengwei	200 m	21.87	51	Did not advance			
Muhammad Naqib Asmin	200 m	21.90	=52	Did not advance			
Calvin Kang; Lee Chengwei; Muhammad Elfi Mustapa; Muhammad Naqib Asmin	4 × 100 m relay	40.05	9	—N/a		Did not advance	
Mok Ying Ren	Marathon	—N/a				DNS	

Women
Track events

Athlete	Event	Heat		Semifinal		Final	
Athlete	Event	Result	Rank	Result	Rank	Result	Rank
Eugenia Tan	100 m	12.59	40	Did not advance			
Habibah Najibahbi Ahmad	100 m	12.78	43	Did not advance			
Tyra Summer Ree	200 m	26.74	41	Did not advance			
Veronica Shanti Pereira	200 m	24.31	22	Did not advance			
Eugenia Tan; Habibah Najibahbi Ahmad; Kugapriya Chandran; Veronica Shanti Pereira	4 × 100 m relay	46.84	12	—N/a		Did not advance	

Key

- Note–Ranks given for track events are within the athlete's heat only
- Q = Qualified for the next round
- q = Qualified for the next round as a fastest loser or, in field events, by position without achieving the qualifying target
- NR = National record
- N/A = Round not applicable for the event
- Bye = Athlete not required to compete in round

== Badminton ==
Individual

Athlete	Event	Round of 64	Round of 32	Round of 16	Quarterfinals	Semifinals	Final	Rank
Athlete	Event	Opposition Score	Opposition Score	Opposition Score	Opposition Score	Opposition Score	Opposition Score	Rank
Loh Kean Yew (6)	Men's singles	M Constable (JER); W 2–0	G Cupidon (SEY); W 2–0	G Henry (JAM); W 2–0	S Kidambi (IND); W 2–1	R M V Gurusaidutt (IND); W 2-1	Gold medal match K Parupalli (IND); L 1–2	2nd place, silver medalist(s)
Huang Chao	Men's singles	D Jaffray (FAI); W 2–0	A I Jaman (BAN); W 2–0	R Ouseph (ENG); L 0–2	Did not advance			
Liang Xiaoyu	Women's singles	K Foo Kune (MRI); W 2–0	D Archer (GHA); W 2–0	M Li (CAN); L 0–2	Did not advance			

Doubles

Athlete	Event	Round of 64	Round of 32	Round of 16	Quarterfinals	Semifinals	Final	Rank
Athlete	Event	Opposition Score	Opposition Score	Opposition Score	Opposition Score	Opposition Score	Opposition Score	Rank
Danny Bawa Chrisnanta; Chayut Triyachart (3)	Men's doubles	Bye	J Morgan & N Strange (WAL); W 2–0	A Lubah & J Paul (MRI); W 2–0	R Blair & P van Rietvelde (SCO); W 2–0	C Langridge & P Mills (ENG); W 2-1	Gold medal match Tan W K & Goh V S (MAS); L 1-2	2nd place, silver medalist(s)
Shinta Mulia Sari; Yao Lei (1)	Women's doubles	—N/a	Bye	K H Clague & C E Marritt (IOM); W 2–0	Lim Y L & Lai P J (MAS); L 1–2	Did not advance		
Fu Mingtian; Vanessa Neo	Women's doubles	—N/a	C Black & S Chambers (NIR); W 2–0	G Adcock & L Smith (ENG); L 0–2	Did not advance			
Chayut Triyachart; Yao Lei	Mixed doubles	S Dias & U Weerasinghe (SRI); W 2–0	R Smith & R Veeran (AUS); W 2–1	K Dennerly-Minturn & M Stapleton (NZL); W 1–0^{r}	C Adcock & G Adcock (ENG); L 0–2	Did not advance		
Terry Hee; Fu Mingtian	Mixed doubles	B Li & C E Marritt (IOM); W 2–0	S Edoo & Y Louison (MRI); W 2–0	R Blair & I Bankier (SCO); L 0–2	Did not advance			
Danny Bawa Chrisnanta; Vanessa Neo (2)	Mixed doubles	Bye	A Liu & M Li (CAN); W 2–0	R Tam & G Somerville (AUS); W 2–0	Chan P S & Lai P J (MAS); L 1–2	Did not advance		

Mixed team

Pool E

Pos	Team	Pld	W	L	GF	GA	GD	PF	PA	PD	Pts	Qualification
1	Singapore	3	3	0	30	1	+29	644	278	+366	3	Quarterfinals
2	South Africa	3	2	1	18	14	+4	551	457	+94	2	
3	Jamaica	3	1	2	15	18	−3	527	510	+17	1	
4	Norfolk Island	3	0	3	0	30	−30	153	630	−477	0	

Source: glasgow2014.com

Singapore
5
Commonwealth Arena, Glasgow
24 July

Jamaica
0

			1	2	3
1	(Singapore) (Jamaica)	Chayut Triyachart / Yao Lei; Garron Palmer / Geordine Henry	21; 8	21; 11
2	(Singapore) (Jamaica)	Derek Wong; Gareth Henry	21; 11	21; 11
3	(Singapore) (Jamaica)	Liang Xiaoyu; Ruth Williams	21; 7	21; 5
4	(Singapore) (Jamaica)	Danny Bawa Chrisnanta / Terry Hee; Gareth Henry / Garron Palmer	21; 14	14; 21	21; 14
5	(Singapore) (Jamaica)	Vanessa Neo / Fu Mingtian; Ruth Williams / Geordine Henry	21; 4	21; 8

Singapore
5
Commonwealth Arena, Glasgow
25 July

South Africa
0

			1	2	3
1	(Singapore) (South Africa)	Chayut Triyachart / Terry Hee; Andries Malan / Willem Viljoen	21; 12	21; 16
2	(Singapore) (South Africa)	Liang Xiaoyu; Elme de Villiers	21; 9	21; 9
3	(Singapore) (South Africa)	Huang Chao; Jacob Maliekal	21; 11	21; 11
4	(Singapore) (South Africa)	Yao Lei / Shinta Mulia Sari; Sandra le Grange / Elme de Villiers	21; 9	21; 14
5	(Singapore) (South Africa)	Danny Bawa Chrisnanta / Vanessa Neo; Andries Malan / Jennifer Fry	21; 13	21; 12

Singapore
5
Commonwealth Arena, Glasgow
26 July

Norfolk Island
0

			1	2	3
1	(Singapore) (Norfolk Island)	Terry Hee / Fu Mingtian; Michael Donohoe / Joanne Snell	21; 3	21; 10
2	(Singapore) (Norfolk Island)	Derek Wong; Richard Cribb	21; 2	21; 1
3	(Singapore) (Norfolk Island)	Liang Xiaoyu; Terry Gray	21; 5	21; 7
4	(Singapore) (Norfolk Island)	Chayut Triyachart / Danny Bawa Chrisnanta; Richard Cribb / Michael Donohoe	21; 7	21; 3
5	(Singapore) (Norfolk Island)	Shinta Mulia Sari / Yao Lei; Joanne Snell / Terry Gray	21; 7	21; 3

Quarterfinals

Singapore
3
Commonwealth Arena, Glasgow
26 July

Australia
0

			1	2	3
1	(Singapore) (Australia)	Danny Bawa Chrisnanta / Vanessa Neo; Ross Smith / Renuga Veeran	21; 15	21; 14
2	(Singapore) (Australia)	Derek Wong; Jeff Tho	21; 7	21; 13
3	(Singapore) (Australia)	Chayut Triyachart / Danny Bawa Chrisnanta; Ross Smith / Robin Middleton	21; 17	21; 19
4	(Singapore) (Australia)	Liang Xiaoyu; Verdet Kessler				not played
5	(Singapore) (Australia)	Shinta Mulia Sari / Yao Lei; Renuga Veeran / Tang Hetian				not played

Semifinals

Malaysia
3
Commonwealth Arena, Glasgow
27 July

Singapore
2

			1	2	3
1	(Malaysia) (Singapore)	Goh V Shem / Tan Wee Kiong; Chayut Triyachart / Danny Bawa Chrisnanta	21; 17	18; 21	21; 16
2	(Malaysia) (Singapore)	Chong Wei Feng; Derek Wong	21; 9	21; 18
3	(Malaysia) (Singapore)	Tee Jing Yi; Liang Xiaoyu	12; 21	20; 22
4	(Malaysia) (Singapore)	Vivian Hoo / Woon Khe Wei; Yao Lei / Shinta Mulia Sari	9; 21	18; 21
5	(Malaysia) (Singapore)	Chan Peng Soon / Lai Pei Jing; Danny Bawa Chrisnanta / Vanessa Neo	17; 21	21; 12	21; 14

Bronze medal match

Singapore
3
Commonwealth Arena, Glasgow
28 July

India
2

			1	2	3
1	(Singapore) (India)	Danny Bawa Chrisnanta / Vanessa Neo; R.M.V. Gurusaidutt / Ashwini Ponnappa	21; 19	21; 19
2	(Singapore) (India)	Huang Chao; Kashyap Parupalli	15; 21	20; 22
3	(Singapore) (India)	Danny Bawa Chrisnanta / Chayut Triyachart; Akshay Dewalker & Pranav Chopra	21; 12	21; 16
4	(Singapore) (India)	Liang Xiaoyu; P. V. Sindhu	22; 24	13; 21
5	(Singapore) (India)	Shinta Mulia Sari / Yao Lei; Jwala Gutta / Ashwini Ponnappa	21; 17	29; 27

== Gymnastics ==
=== Artistic ===
Men
All-around

Athlete	Event	Qualification								Final							
Athlete	Event	F	PH	R	V	PB	HB	Total	Rank	F	PH	R	V	PB	HB	Total	Rank
Aizat Muhammad Jufrie	Individual	—N/a	10.133	12.333	13.866; Q	12.466	11.275	—N/a		Did not advance							
Gabriel Gan Zi Jie	Individual	13.008	13.866; Q	12.366	12.666	12.866	12.966	77.738	15 Q	13.033	13.450	11.133	13.366	12.866	10.933	74.781	23
Hoe Wah Toon	Individual	14.366; Q	—N/a		13.899; Q	—N/a				Did not advance							
Terry Tay Wei An	Individual	13.000	—N/a	10.633	13.816	—N/a				Did not advance							
Timothy Tay Kai Cheng	Individual	13.433	10.300	10.366	—N/a	13.133	11.266	—N/a		Did not advance							
Aizat Muhammad Jufrie; Gabriel Gan Zi Jie; Hoe Wah Toon; Terry Tay Wei An; Timothy Tay Kai Cheng	Team	—N/a								40.807	34.299	35.332	42.432	38.465	35.507	226.842	10

Individual events

Athlete	Apparatus	Score	Rank
Hoe Wah Toon	Floor	13.733	7
Gabriel Gan Zi Jie	Pommel horse	14.266	6
Aizat Muhammad Jufrie	Vault	14.016	6
Hoe Wah Toon	Vault	14.195	3rd place, bronze medalist(s)

Women
All-around

Athlete	Event	Qualification						Final					
Athlete	Event	F	V	UB	BB	Total	Rank	F	V	UB	BB	Total	Rank
Ashly Lau	Individual	11.300	13.066	11.800	—N/a			Did not advance					
Janessa Dai	Individual	12.766	13.208	11.533	11.400	48.907	19 Q	12.633	13.333	10.833	11.666	48.465	18
Joey Tam	Individual	—N/a			12.900	—N/a		Did not advance					
Lim Heem Wei	Individual	12.600	13.500	11.400	12.866	50.366	16 Q	12.300	13.033	11.600	11.366	48.299	19
Michelle Teo	Individual	11.533	13.066	10.800	—N/a			Did not advance					
Ashly Lau; Janessa Dai; Joey Tam; Lim Heem Wei; Michelle Teo	Team	—N/a						36.899	39.774	34.733	37.166	148.572	7

=== Rhythmic ===
All-around

Athlete	Event	Qualification						Final					
Athlete	Event	Hoop	Ball	Clubs	Ribbon	Total	Rank	Hoop	Ball	Clubs	Ribbon	Total	Rank
Daphne Theresa Chia	Individual	11.375	8.550	11.400	11.350	42.675	24	Did not advance					
Phaan Yi Lin	Individual	9.050	9.150	9.850	9.050	37.100	28	Did not advance					
Tong Kah Mun	Individual	11.225	12.100	11.600	11.725	46.650	19 Q	11.850	11.750	11.800	12.700	48.100	13
Daphne Theresa Chia; Phaan Yi Lin; Tong Kah Mun	Team	—N/a						31.650	29.800	32.850	32.125	108.825	8

== Shooting ==
Men
Pistol/Small bore

Athlete	Event	Qualification		Final	
Athlete	Event	Points	Rank	Points	Rank
Keith Chan	10 m air rifle	610.4	11	Did not advance	
Sean Tay	10 m air rifle	609.7	12	Did not advance	
Abel Lim	50 m rifle prone	616.2	10	Did not advance	
Gai Bin	50 m pistol	541	5 Q	143.4	4
Lim Swee Hon	50 m pistol	535	7 Q	108.3	6
Gai Bin	10 m air pistol	567	11	Did not advance	
Lim Swee Hon	10 m air pistol	562	16	Did not advance	

Women
Pistol/Small bore

Athlete	Event	Qualification		Semifinals		Final	
Athlete	Event	Points	Rank	Points	Rank	Points	Rank
Jasmine Ser	10 m air rifle	413.1	5 Q	—N/a		163.2	4
Martina Veloso	10 m air rifle	414.9	2 Q	—N/a		143.4	5
Jasmine Ser	50 m rifle prone	—N/a				612.0	15
Jasmine Ser	50 m rifle three positions	581 GR	1 Q	—N/a		449.1 FGR	1st place, gold medalist(s)
Li Yafei	50 m rifle three positions	572	5 Q	—N/a		411.3	5
Nicole Tan Ling Chiao	25 m pistol	554	14	Did not advance			
Teo Shun Xie	25 m pistol	582	1 Q	13	5	Did not advance	
Nicole Tan Ling Chiao	10 m air pistol	362	21	—N/a		Did not advance	
Teo Shun Xie	10 m air pistol	377	5 Q	—N/a		198.6	1st place, gold medalist(s)

== Swimming ==
Men

Athlete	Event	Heat		Semifinal		Final	
Athlete	Event	Time	Rank	Time	Rank	Time	Rank
Clement Lim	50 m freestyle	23.27	18	Did not advance			
Quah Zheng Wen	50 m freestyle	23.81	=22	Did not advance			
Clement Lim	100 m freestyle	50.93	17	Did not advance			
Danny Yeo	100 m freestyle	51.84	22	Did not advance			
Quah Zheng Wen	200 m freestyle	1:53.88	23	—N/a		Did not advance	
Danny Yeo	200 m freestyle	1:50.71	16	—N/a		Did not advance	
Danny Yeo	400 m freestyle	3:56.70	17	—N/a		Did not advance	
Quah Zheng Wen	50 m backstroke	25.99 NR	10 Q	26.15	9	Did not advance	
Quah Zheng Wen	100 m backstroke	56.37	13 Q	56.43	13	Did not advance	
Christopher Cheong	50 m breaststroke	30.50	24	Did not advance			
Christopher Cheong	100 m breaststroke	1:05.14	17	Did not advance			
Christopher Cheong	200 m breaststroke	2:24.41	17	—N/a		Did not advance	
Joseph Schooling	50 m butterfly	23.43 NR	2 Q	23.48	5 Q	23.96	7
Quah Zheng Wen	100 m butterfly	54.46	15 Q	54.29	14	Did not advance	
Joseph Schooling	100 m butterfly	53.58	=9 Q	52.22	3 Q	51.69 NR	2nd place, silver medalist(s)
Joseph Schooling	200 m butterfly	1:58.04	5 Q	—N/a		1:59.09	8
Joseph Schooling	200 m individual medley	2:07.04	15	—N/a		Did not advance	
Clement Lim; Quah Zheng Wen; Joseph Schooling; Danny Yeo	4 × 100 m freestyle relay	3:22.66	7 Q	—N/a		3:20.98 NR	8
Clement Lim; Quah Zheng Wen; Joseph Schooling; Danny Yeo	4 × 200 m freestyle relay	7:26.96	7 Q	—N/a		7:28.01	8
Christopher Cheong; Clement Lim; Quah Zheng Wen; Joseph Schooling	4 × 100 m medley relay	3:48.01	9	—N/a		Did not advance	

Women

Athlete	Event	Heat		Semifinal		Final	
Athlete	Event	Time	Rank	Time	Rank	Time	Rank
Marina Chan	50 m freestyle	26.17	17	Did not advance			
Amanda Lim	50 m freestyle	25.81	13 Q	25.93	14	Did not advance	
Quah Ting Wen	50 m freestyle	26.90	20	Did not advance			
Marina Chan	100 m freestyle	57.37	16 Q	57.49	16	Did not advance	
Amanda Lim	100 m freestyle	57.78	19	Did not advance			
Quah Ting Wen	100 m freestyle	57.92	20	Did not advance			
Amanda Lim	200 m freestyle	2:06.24	21	—N/a		Did not advance	
Lynette Lim	200 m freestyle	2:03.91	18	—N/a		Did not advance	
Quah Ting Wen	200 m freestyle	2:05.08	20	—N/a		Did not advance	
Lynette Lim	400 m freestyle	4:22.92	19	—N/a		Did not advance	
Lynette Lim	800 m freestyle	8:58.53	15	—N/a		Did not advance	
Tao Li	50 m backstroke	29.11	9 Q	29.13	9	Did not advance	
Tao Li	100 m backstroke	DNS		Did not advance			
Samantha Yeo	50 m breaststroke	33.26	15 Q	32.83	14	Did not advance	
Samantha Yeo	100 m breaststroke	1:11.53	18	Did not advance			
Samantha Yeo	200 m breaststroke	2:38.12	17	—N/a		Did not advance	
Marina Chan	50 m butterfly	28.06	19	Did not advance			
Quah Ting Wen	50 m butterfly	27.87	18	Did not advance			
Tao Li	50 m butterfly	26.44	=5 Q	26.33	5	26.26	5
Quah Ting Wen	100 m butterfly	1:01.90	15 Q	1:01.48	15	Did not advance	
Tao Li	100 m butterfly	59.22	10 Q	59.82	10	Did not advance	
Lynette Lim	200 m butterfly	2:21.45	19	—N/a		Did not advance	
Quah Ting Wen	200 m butterfly	DSQ		—N/a		Did not advance	
Samantha Yeo	200 m individual medley	2:21.01	16	—N/a		Did not advance	
Marina Chan; Amanda Lim; Lynette Lim; Quah Ting Wen	4 × 100 m freestyle relay	3:51.20	7 Q	—N/a		3:49.69	7
Marina Chan; Amanda Lim; Lynette Lim; Quah Ting Wen	4 × 200 m freestyle relay	8:25.18	8 Q	—N/a		8:16.39	7
Marina Chan; Tao Li; Quah Ting Wen; Samantha Yeo	4 × 100 m medley relay	4:17.43	7 Q	—N/a		DNS	

== Table tennis ==
Singles

Athletes	Event	Preliminary round			Round of 32	Round of 16	Quarterfinal	Semifinal	Final	Rank
Athletes	Event	Opposition Score	Opposition Score	Rank	Opposition Score	Opposition Score	Opposition Score	Opposition Score	Opposition Score	Rank
Gao Ning	Men's singles	Bye			P Xiao (NZL); W 4–0	Q Aruna (NGR); W 4–0	W Henzell (AUS); W 4–1	L Pitchford (ENG); W 4–3	Gold medal match Zhan J (SIN); L 1–4	2nd place, silver medalist(s)
Li Hu	Men's singles	Bye			R Sirisena (SRI); W 4–0	S Ghosh (IND); L 1–4	Did not advance			
Zhan Jian	Men's singles	Bye			D St. Louis (TRI); W 4–0	H R Desai (IND); W 4–0	E Wang Z (CAN); W 4–2	S Kamal (IND); W 4–0	Gold medal match Gao N (SIN); W 4–1	1st place, gold medalist(s)
Feng Tianwei	Women's singles	Bye			C Akpan (NGR); W 4–0	Z Dederko (AUS); W 4–1	Beh L W (MAS); W 4–0	Lin Y (SIN); W 4–1	Gold medal match Yu MY (SIN); W 4–1	1st place, gold medalist(s)
Lin Ye	Women's singles	Bye			M Phillips (WAL); W 4–1	K Sibley (ENG); W 4–1	M Batra (IND); W 4–1	Feng TW (SIN); L 1–4	Bronze medal match Lay J F (AUS); W 4–0	3rd place, bronze medalist(s)
Yu Mengyu	Women's singles	Bye			T T Ho (ENG); W 4–1	S Kumaresan (IND); W 4–1	Zhang M (CAN); W 4–1	Lay J F (AUS); W 4–0	Gold medal match Feng TW (SIN); L 1–4	2nd place, silver medalist(s)

Doubles

Athletes	Event	Round of 64	Round of 32	Round of 16	Quarterfinal	Semifinal	Final	Rank
Athletes	Event	Opposition Score	Opposition Score	Opposition Score	Opposition Score	Opposition Score	Opposition Score	Rank
Gao Ning; Li Hu	Men's doubles	—N/a	B Chan Y F & A Yogarajah (MRI); W 3–0	Ashraf & Shakirin (MAS); W 3–0	H R Desai & S Ghosh (IND); W 3–1	P Drinkhall & L Pitchford (ENG); W 3–1	Gold medal match S Kamal & A Amalraj (IND); W 3–1	1st place, gold medalist(s)
Yang Zi; Zhan Jian	Men's doubles	—N/a	Leong C F & D Foo (MAS); W 3–0	C Humphreys & D St. Louis (TRI); W 3–0	A Ho & P-L Thériault (CAN); W 3–1	S Kamal & A Amalraj (IND); L 0–3	Bronze medal match P Drinkhall & L Pitchford (ENG); W 3–2	3rd place, bronze medalist(s)
Feng Tianwei; Yu Mengyu	Women's doubles	—N/a	L Flaws & C Whitaker (SCO); W 3–0	C Carey & N Owen (WAL); W 3–0	C Li & K Li (NZL); W 3–1	J Drinkhall & K Sibley (NZL); W 3–0	Gold medal match Lay J F & Miao M (AUS); W 3–1	1st place, gold medalist(s)
Lin Ye; Zhou Yihan	Women's doubles	—N/a	M Adom Amankwaa & B Borquaye (GHA); W 3–0	A Phillips & C Thomas (WAL); W 3–0	Lay J F & Miao M (AUS); L 2–3	Did not advance		
Zhan Jian; Feng Tianwei	Mixed doubles	B Sam & M Adom Amankwaa (GHA); W 3–0	Shakirin & Beh L W (MAS); W 3–0	Q Aruna & O Oshonaike (NGR); W 3–0	W Henzell & Miao M (AUS); W 3–0	L Pitchford & T T Ho (ENG); L 2–3	Bronze medal match D Reed & K Sibley (ENG); L 1–3	4
Gao Ning; Lin Ye	Mixed doubles	Y Shing & A Lulu (VAN); W 3–0	S Jenkins & N Owen (WAL); W 3–1	A A Arputharaj & M S Patkar (IND); W 3–2	P Drinkhall & J Drinkhall (ENG); L 1–3	Did not advance		
Li Hu; Yu Mengyu	Mixed doubles	K Farley & K Harvey (BAR); W 3–0	P David & T Lowe (GUY); W 3–0	D Reed & K Sibley (ENG); L 0–3	Did not advance			
Clarence Chew; Isabelle Li	Mixed doubles	N Jayasinghe & C Fernando (GUY); W 3–0	Ashraf & Lee R Y (MAS); W 3–2	E Wang Z Zhang M (CAN); L 0–3	Did not advance			

Team

Athletes	Event	Preliminary round				First round	Quarterfinal	Semifinal	Final	Rank
Athletes	Event	Opposition Score	Opposition Score	Opposition Score	Rank	Opposition Score	Opposition Score	Opposition Score	Opposition Score	Rank
Clarence Chew; Gao Ning; Li Hu; Yang Zi; Zhan Jian	Men's team	Ghana; W 3–0	Sri Lanka; W 3–0	Seychelles; W 3–0	1 Q	Bye	New Zealand; W 3–0	Nigeria; W 3–1	Gold medal match England; W 3–1	1st place, gold medalist(s)
Feng Tianwei; Isabelle Li; Lin Ye; Yu Mengyu; Zhou Yihan	Women's team	Sri Lanka; W 3–0	Northern Ireland; W 3–0	—N/a	1 Q	Bye	Canada; W 3–0	India; W 3–1	Gold medal match Malaysia; W 3–0	1st place, gold medalist(s)

== Weightlifting ==
Men

Athlete	Event	Weight lifted		Total	Rank
Athlete	Event	Snatch	Clean & jerk	Total	Rank
Lewis Chua	+105 kg	133	182	315	10
Scott Wong	+105 kg	135	—	—	—
