= Table tennis at the 2014 Commonwealth Games – Men's doubles =

Table Tennis – Men's doubles at the 2014 Commonwealth Games
- Venue: Scotstoun Sports Campus, Glasgow
- Dates: 30 July – 01 August 2014
- Competitors: 112 from 37 nations

Medalists
gold medal	Gao Ning; Li Hu	Singapore
silver medal	Sharath Kamal; Amalraj Anthony Arputharaj	India
bronze medal	Yang Zi; Zhan Jian	Singapore

The Men's doubles table tennis event at the 2014 Commonwealth Games was held from 31 July to 1 August at the Scotstoun Sports Campus in Glasgow.

== Draw ==
=== Top half ===
==== Section 1 ====
First round 30 July 13:00
33; 31	Shamar Britton (GUY); Christopher Franklin (GUY)	11	9	10	11	7
66; 65	Brian Chan Yook Fo (MRI); Akhilen Yogarajah (MRI)	5	11	12	8	11
49; 50	Choy Freddy (KIR); Katirakei Tetabo (KIR)	7	7	10
129; 128	Conor Edwards (WAL); Daniel O'Connell (WAL)	11	11	12
10; 11	Kevin Farley (BAR); Trevor Farley (BAR)	3	5	6
78; 79	John Cordue (NZL); Peter Jackson (NZL)	11	11	11
117; 118	Yuvraaj Dookram (TTO); Aaron Wilson (TTO)	11	11	11
18; 19	Marlon Dyer (DMA); Dane Taylor (DMA)	5	8	8

Second round 30 July 20:00
95; 97	Gao Ning (SIN); Li Hu (SIN)	13	11	11
66; 65	Brian Chan Yook Fo (MRI); Akhilen Yogarajah (MRI)	11	2	7
129; 128	Conor Edwards (WAL); Daniel O'Connell (WAL)	2	12	5	6
58; 56	Ashraf (MAS); Shakirin (MAS)	11	10	11	11
73; 74	Paul McCreery (NIR); Ashley Robinson (NIR)	11	11	2	11
78; 79	John Cordue (NZL); Peter Jackson (NZL)	5	8	11	9
117; 116	Yuvraaj Dookram (TTO); Aaron Wilson (TTO)	6	7	6
36; 35	Harmeet Desai (IND); Soumyajit Ghosh (IND)	11	11	11

Third round 31 July 11:15
95; 97	Gao Ning (SIN); Li Hu (SIN)	15	11	11
58; 56	Ashraf (MAS); Shakirin (MAS)	13	6	8
73; 74	Paul McCreery (NIR); Ashley Robinson (NIR)	11	8	6	5
36; 35	Harmeet Desai (IND); Soumyajit Ghosh (IND)	8	11	11	11

Quarterfinals; 31 July 17:00
95; 97	Gao Ning (SIN); Li Hu (SIN)	10	11	11	11
36; 35	Harmeet Desai (IND); Soumyajit Ghosh (IND)	12	9	8	8

==== Section 2 ====
First round 30 July 13:00
60; 61	Stewart Hara (MAW); Abel Somba (MAW)	11	11	11
124; 125	Alan Lin (VAN); Samuel Saul (VAN)	9	8	7
120; 121	Kevin Evans Mafabi (UGA); Paul Moody Mutambuze (UGA)	8	7	11	9
106; 104	Dinesh Deshappriya (SRI); Rohan Sirisena (SRI)	11	11	9	11
4; 5	Hu Heming (AUS); Yan Xin (AUS)	11	11	11
87; 85	Boe Mea (PNG); Gasika Sepa Loi (PNG)	2	6	5
108; 133	Javier de Shong (SVG); Sean Stanley (SVG)	6	7	8
51; 52	Omarie Ferdinand (LCA); Jedaiah Pierre (LCA)	11	11	11
40; 39	Simon Tomlinson (JAM); Kane Watson (JAM)	10	9	1
26; 25	Derek Abrefa (GHA); Felix Lartey (GHA)	12	11	11

Second round 30 July 20:00
68; 69	Quadri Aruna (NGR); Segun Toriola (NGR)	11	11	11
60; 61	Stewart Hara (MAW); Abel Somba (MAW)	9	3	2
106; 104	Dinesh Deshappriya (SRI); Rohan Srisena (SRI)	8	13	6	11	6
89; 88	Craig Howieson (SCO); Gavin Rumgay (SCO)	11	11	11	3	11
4; 5	Hu Heming (AUS); Yan Xin (AUS)	15	11	11
51; 52	Omarie Ferdinand (LCA); Jedaiah Pierre (LCA)	13	2	7
26; 25	Derek Abrefa (GHA); Felix Lartey (GHA)	7	6	7
21; 20	Paul Drinkhall (ENG); Liam Pitchford (ENG)	11	11	11

Third round 31 July 11:15
68; 69	Quadri Aruna (NGR); Segun Toriola (NGR)	11	11	11
89; 88	Craig Howieson (SCO); Gavin Rumgay (SCO)	4	7	7
4; 5	Hu Heming (AUS); Yan Xin (AUS)	8	11	4	2
21; 20	Paul Drinkhall (ENG); Liam Pitchford (ENG)	11	6	11	11

Quarterfinals; 31 July 17:00
68; 69	Quadri Aruna (NGR); Segun Toriola (NGR)	7	11	11	5	7
21; 20	Paul Drinkhall (ENG); Liam Pitchford (ENG)	11	8	6	11	11

=== Bottom half ===
==== Section 1 ====
First round 30 July 13:00
84; 83	David Loi (PNG); Geoffrey Loi (PNG)	7	5	7
130; 132	Simasiku Kalaluka (ZAM); Friday Ng'andu (ZAM)	11	11	11
109; 110	Kavir Gaymes Jr. (SVG); Romano Spencer (SVG)	9	6	5
46; 47	Michael Owuor Otieno (KEN); Anthony Mathenge Ringui (KEN)	11	11	11
76; 77	Liu Tengteng (NZL); Phillip Xiao (NZL)	10	11	9	12
91; 90	Niall Cameron (SCO); Sean Doherty (SCO)	12	8	11	14
53; 54	Adrian Albert (LCA); Chris Wells (LCA)	9	6	6
43; 44	Josh Band (JER); Craig Gascoyne (JER)	11	11	11
100; 101	Andre Freeman (SKN); Calvin Lake (SKN)	3	3	3
28; 27	Samuel Akayade (GHA); Emmanuel Comey (GHA)	11	11	11

Second round 30 July 20:00
34; 37	Sharath Kamal (IND); Amalraj Anthony Arputharaj (IND)	11	11	11
130; 132	Simasiku Kalaluka (ZAM); Friday Ng'andu (ZAM)	6	4	3
46; 47	Michael Owuor Otieno (KEN); Anthony Mathenge Ringui (KEN)	6	3	5
126; 127	Ryan Jenkins (WAL); Stephen Jenkins (WAL)	11	11	11
91; 90	Niall Cameron (SCO); Sean Doherty (SCO)	11	11	12
43; 44	Josh Band (JER); Craig Gascoyne (JER)	7	8	10
28; 27	Samuel Akayade (GHA); Emmanuel Commey (GHA)	7	7	12	9
23; 24	Daniel Reed (ENG); Sam Walker (ENG)	11	11	10	11

Third round 31 July 11:15
34; 37	Sharath Kamal (IND); Amalraj Anthony Arputharaj (IND)	11	11	11
126; 127	Ryan Jenkins (WAL); Stephen Jenkins (WAL)	8	4	9
91; 90	Niall Cameron (SCO); Sean Doherty (SCO)	3	10	5
23; 24	Daniel Reed (ENG); Sam Walker (ENG)	11	12	11

Quarterfinals; 31 July 17:00
34; 37	Sharath Kamal (IND); Amalraj Anthony Arputharaj (IND)	12	11	7	11
23; 24	Daniel Reed (ENG); Sam Walker (ENG)	10	6	11	8

==== Section 2 ====
First round 30 July 13:00
107; 105	Nirmala Jayasinghe (SRI); Udaya Ranasingha (SRI)	11	11	11
63; 64	Moosa Ahmed (MDV); Zeesth Naseem (MDV)	7	8	8
122; 123	Ham Lulu (VAN); Yoshua Shing (VAN)	7	11	11	11	11
41; 42	Christopher Marsh (JAM); Dale Parham (JAM)	11	13	2	6	9
115; 114	Curtis Humphreys (TTO); Dexter St. Louis (TTO)	11	11	11
81; 82	Tabish Khurshid (PAK); Muhammad Rameez (PAK)	8	1	2
8; 6	Mahmub Billah (BAN); Manash Chowdhury (BAN)	6	10	5
30; 32	Paul David (GUY); Idi Lewis (GUY)	11	12	11
92; 94	Nicolas Esther (SEY); Godfrey Sultan (SEY)	8	12	6	11	10
57; 59	Leong Chee Feng (MAS); Dunley Foo (MAS)	11	10	11	9	12

Second round 30 July 20:00
1; 2	William Henzell (AUS); David Powell (AUS)	10	11	11	11
107; 105	Nirmala Jayasinghe (SRI); Udaya Ranasingha (SRI)	12	4	5	9
122; 123	Ham Lulu (VAN); Yoshua Shing (VAN)	9	5	4
15; 16	Andre Ho (CAN); Pierre-Luc Thériault (CAN)	11	11	11
115; 114	Curtis Humphreys (TTO); Dexter St. Louis (TTO)	12	11	9	11	11
30; 32	Paul David (GUY); Idi Lewis (GUY)	14	7	11	8	4
57; 59	Leong Chee Feng (MAS); Dunley Foo (MAS)	9	5	8
99; 96	Yang Zi (SIN); Zhan Jian (SIN)	11	11	11

Third round 31 July 11:15
1; 2	William Henzell (AUS); David Powell (AUS)	5	11	7	8
15; 16	Andre Ho (CAN); Pierre-Luc Thériault (CAN)	11	9	11	11
115; 114	Curtis Humphrey (TTO); Dexter St. Louis (TTO)	10	7	5
99; 96	Yang Zi (SIN); Zhan Jian (SIN)	12	11	11

Quarterfinals; 31 July 17:00
15; 16	Andre Ho (CAN); Pierre-Luc Thériault (CAN)	7	8	11	8
99; 96	Yang Zi (SIN); Zhan Jian (SIN)	11	11	9	11

== Finals ==
Semifinals; 01 August 12:00
95; 97	Gao Ning (SIN); Li Hu (SIN)	13	11	3	11
21; 20	Paul Drinkhall (ENG); Liam Pitchford (ENG)	11	9	11	8
34; 37	Sharath Kamal (IND); Amalraj Anthony Arputharaj (IND)	11	12	11
99; 96	Yang Zi (SIN); Zhan Jian (SIN)	7	10	3

Gold medal match 01 August 20:30
95; 97	Gao Ning (SIN); Li Hu (SIN)	8	11	11	11
34; 37	Sharath Kamal (IND); Amalraj Anthony Arputharaj (IND)	11	7	9	5
Bronze medal match 01 August 19:50
21; 20	Paul Drinkhall (ENG); Liam Pitchford (ENG)	6	10	11	11	10
99; 96	Yang Zi (SIN); Zhan Jian (SIN)	11	12	7	8	12
