= Table tennis at the 2014 Commonwealth Games – Men's singles =

Table Tennis – Men's singles at the 2014 Commonwealth Games
- Venue: Scotstoun Sports Campus, Glasgow
- Dates: 29 July – 2 August 2014
- Competitors: 106 from 42 nations

Medalists
gold medal	Zhan Jian	Singapore
silver medal	Gao Ning	Singapore
bronze medal	Liam Pitchford	England

The Men's singles table tennis event at the 2014 Commonwealth Games was held from 29 July to 2 August at the Scotstoun Sports Campus in Glasgow.

== Group stage ==
=== Pool A ===
Name	MP	MW	ML	GP	GW	GL	PW	PL
Andre Ho (CAN)	2	2	0	8	8	0	88	18
Romano Spencer (SVG)	2	1	1	9	4	5	68	92
David Loi (PNG)	2	0	2	9	1	8	55	101

Qualified for the First round

29 July 10:05 (Report)
Andre Ho (CAN)	11	11	11	11	4
David Loi (PNG)	1	1	1	4	0

29 July 11:50 (Report)
Romano Spencer (SVG)	13	11	11	11	11	4
David Loi (PNG)	11	13	9	7	8	1

29 July 13:35 (Report)
Andre Ho (CAN)	11	11	11	11	4
Romano Spencer (SVG)	1	4	3	3	0

=== Pool B ===
Name	MP	MW	ML	GP	GW	GL	PW	PL
Pierre-Luc Thériault (CAN)	2	2	0	8	8	0	88	36
Gilton Chelibe (UGA)	2	1	1	8	4	4	66	75
Alan Lin (VAN)	2	0	2	8	0	8	48	91

Qualified for the First round

29 July 10:05 (Report)
Pierre-Luc Thériault (CAN)	11	11	11	11	4
Alan Lin (VAN)	1	4	6	6	0

29 July 11:50 (Report)
Gilton Chelibe (UGA)	11	11	11	14	4
Alan Lin (VAN)	9	8	2	12	0

29 July 13:35 (Report)
Pierre-Luc Thériault (CAN)	11	11	11	11	4
Gilton Chelibe (UGA)	8	5	4	2	0

=== Pool C ===
Name	MP	MW	ML	GP	GW	GL	PW	PL
Dexter St. Louis (TTO)	2	2	0	10	8	2	111	78
Kevin Farley (BAR)	2	1	1	10	6	4	108	90
Michael Owuor Otieno (KEN)	2	0	2	8	0	8	37	88

Qualified for the First round

29 July 10:05 (Report)
Dexter St. Louis (TTO)	11	11	11	11	4
Michael Owuor Otieno (KEN)	4	1	3	6	0

29 July 11:50 (Report)
Kevin Farley (BAR)	11	11	11	11	4
Michael Owuor Otieno (KEN)	3	9	2	9	0

29 July 13:35 (Report)
Dexter St. Louis (TTO)	18	7	8	12	11	11	4
Kevin Farley (BAR)	16	11	11	10	8	8	2

=== Pool D ===
Name	MP	MW	ML	GP	GW	GL	PW	PL
Marios Yiangou (CYP)	2	2	0	8	8	0	88	37
Mahmub Billah (BAN)	2	1	1	11	4	7	94	96
Simasiku Kalaluka (ZAM)	2	0	2	11	3	8	64	113

Qualified for the First round

29 July 10:05 (Report)
Marios Yiangou (CYP)	11	11	11	11	4
Simasiku Kalaluku (ZAM)	6	3	2	1	0

29 July 11:50 (Report)
Mahmub Billah (BAN)	9	11	8	11	11	8	11	4
Simasiku Kalaluka (ZAM)	11	5	11	3	8	11	3	3

29 July 13:35 (Report)
Marios Yiangou (CYP)	11	11	11	11	4
Mahmub Billah (BAN)	8	5	8	4	0

=== Pool E ===
Name	MP	MW	ML	GP	GW	GL	PW	PL
David Powell (AUS)	2	2	0	8	8	0	88	36
Peter Muturi (KEN)	2	1	1	8	4	4	71	84
Thobo Malhatsi (BOT)	2	0	2	8	0	8	40	89

Qualified for the First round

29 July 10:05 (Report)
David Powell (AUS)	11	11	11	11	4
Peter Muturi (KEN)	4	9	8	5	0

29 July 11:50 (Report)
Thobo Malhatsi (BOT)	10	7	6	7	0
Peter Muturi (KEN)	12	11	11	11	4

29 July 13:35 (Report)
David Powell (AUS)	11	11	11	11	4
Thobo Malhatsi (BOT)	3	4	2	1	0

=== Pool F ===
Name	MP	MW	ML	GP	GW	GL	PW	PL
Muhd Shakirin Ibrahim (MAS)	2	2	0	9	8	1	97	69
Christopher Franklin (GUY)	2	1	1	9	4	5	83	86
Craig Gascoyne (JER)	2	0	2	10	2	8	81	106

Qualified for the First round

29 July 10:05 (Report)
Muhd Shakirin Ibrahim (MAS)	11	11	9	11	11	4
Craig Gascoyne (JER)	6	9	11	9	4	1

29 July 11:50 (Report)
Christopher Franklin (GUY)	12	12	7	11	11	4
Craig Gascoyne (JER)	10	10	11	5	6	1

29 July 13:35 (Report)
Muhd Shakirin Ibrahim (MAS)	11	11	11	11	4
Christopher Franklin (GUY)	9	9	3	9	0

=== Pool G ===
Name	MP	MW	ML	GP	GW	GL	PW	PL
Liu Tengteng (NZL)	2	2	0	8	8	0	88	36
Zeesth Naseem (MDV)	2	1	1	8	4	4	61	65
Gasika Sepa Simoi (PNG)	2	0	2	8	0	8	31	89

Qualified for the First round

29 July 10:05 (Report)
Liu Tengteng (NZL)	11	11	11	11	4
Gasika Sepa Simoi (PNG)	3	2	1	4	0

29 July 11:50 (Report)
Zeesth Naseem (MDV)	11	11	11	12	4
Gasika Sepa Simoi (PNG)	3	5	3	10	0

29 July 13:35 (Report)
Liu Tengteng (NZL)	11	11	11	11	4
Zeesth Naseem (MDV)	2	6	5	3	0

=== Pool H ===
Name	MP	MW	ML	GP	GW	GL	PW	PL
Phillip Xiao (NZL)	2	2	0	10	8	2	110	64
Kevin Evans Mafabi (UGA)	2	1	1	10	6	4	97	99
Noel Kasanda (ZAM)	2	0	2	8	0	8	48	92

Qualified for the First round

29 July 10:05 (Report)
Phillip Xiao (NZL)	11	11	11	11	4
Noel Kasanda (ZAM)	3	5	4	3	0

29 July 11:50 (Report)
Kevin Evans Mafabi (UGA)	15	11	11	11	4
Noel Kasanda (ZAM)	13	8	3	9	0

29 July 13:35 (Report)
Phillip Xiao (NZL)	9	11	11	13	11	11	4
Kevin Evans Mafabi (UGA)	11	5	7	15	6	5	2

=== Pool I ===
Name	MP	MW	ML	GP	GW	GL	PW	PL
Paul McCreery (NIR)	2	2	0	8	8	0	88	21
Khethang Mothibi (LES)	2	1	1	8	4	4	59	80
Tyrone Tun (BIZ)	2	0	2	8	0	8	45	91

Qualified for the First round

29 July 10:05 (Report)
Paul McCreery (NIR)	11	11	11	11	4
Khethang Mothibi (LES)	2	4	2	4	0

29 July 11:50 (Report)
Tyrone Tun (BIZ)	7	8	11	10	0
Khethang Mothibi (LES)	11	11	13	12	4

29 July 13:35 (Report)
Paul McCreery (NIR)	11	11	11	11	4
Tyrone Tun (BIZ)	1	4	3	1	0

=== Pool J ===
Name	MP	MW	ML	GP	GW	GL	PW	PL
Craig Howieson (SCO)	2	2	0	8	8	0	88	20
Rob Dorovolomo (SOL)	2	1	1	9	4	5	64	91
Andre Freeman (SKN)	2	0	2	9	1	8	56	97

Qualified for the First round

29 July 10:40 (Report)
Craig Howieson (SCO)	11	11	11	11	4
Rob Dorovolono (SOL)	4	3	2	2	0

29 July 12:25 (Report)
Andre Freeman (SKN)	7	9	11	10	10	1
Rob Dorovolomo (SOL)	11	11	7	12	12	4

29 July 14:10 (Report)
Craig Howieson (SCO)	11	11	11	11	4
Andre Freeman (SKN)	4	2	2	1	0

=== Pool K ===
Name	MP	MW	ML	GP	GW	GL	PW	PL
Leong Chee Feng (MAS)	2	2	0	8	8	0	93	39
Josh Band (JER)	2	1	1	9	4	5	78	84
Katirakei Tetabo (KIR)	2	0	2	9	1	8	47	95

Qualified for the First round

29 July 10:40 (Report)
Leong Chee Feng (MAS)	11	11	11	11	4
Katirakei Tetabo (KIR)	4	3	4	1	0

29 July 12:25 (Report)
Josh Band (JER)	11	11	7	11	11	4
Katirakei Tetabo (KIR)	4	7	11	5	8	1

29 July 14:10 (Report)
Leong Chee Feng (MAS)	11	16	11	11	4
Josh Band (JER)	4	14	3	6	0

=== Pool L ===
Name	MP	MW	ML	GP	GW	GL	PW	PL
Rohan Sirisena (SRI)	2	2	0	8	8	0	88	32
Calvin Lake (SKN)	2	1	1	8	4	4	60	71
Marlon Dyer (DMA)	2	0	2	8	0	8	43	88

Qualified for the First round

29 July 10:40 (Report)
Rohan Sirisena (SRI)	11	11	11	11	4
Calvin Lake (SKN)	2	2	7	5	0

29 July 12:25 (Report)
Marlon Dyer (DMA)	3	9	8	7	0
Calvin Lake (SKN)	11	11	11	11	4

29 July 14:10 (Report)
Rohan Sirisena (SRI)	11	11	11	11	4
Marlon Dyer (DMA)	4	8	2	2	0

=== Pool N ===
Name	MP	MW	ML	GP	GW	GL	PW	PL
Stephen Jenkins (WAL)	2	2	0	9	8	1	93	52
Friday Ng'andu (ZAM)	2	1	1	8	4	4	67	66
Stewart Hara (MAW)	2	0	2	9	1	8	51	93

Qualified for the First round

29 July 16:35 (Report)
Stephen Jenkins (WAL)	11	11	11	11	4
Friday Ng'andu (ZAM)	7	9	2	5	0

29 July 18:20 (Report)
Stewart Hara (MAW)	4	6	4	8	0
Friday Ng'andu (ZAM)	11	11	11	11	4

29 July 20:05 (Report)
Stephen Jenkins (WAL)	11	11	11	5	11	4
Stewart Hara (MAW)	5	3	3	11	7	1

=== Pool O ===
Name	MP	MW	ML	GP	GW	GL	PW	PL
Muhamad Ashraf Haiqal Muhamad Rizal (MAS)	2	2	0	8	8	0	89	49
Godfrey Sultan (SEY)	2	1	1	11	4	7	92	114
Mark-Anthony Dowell (BAR)	2	0	2	11	3	8	91	109

Qualified for the Second round

29 July 16:35 (Report)
Muhamad Ashraf Haiqal Muhamad Rizal (MAS)	12	11	11	11	4
Godfrey Sultan (SEY)	10	3	9	5	0

29 July 18:20 (Report)
Mark-Anthony Dowell (BAR)	11	11	11	9	11	8	8	3
Godfrey Sultan (SEY)	6	8	5	11	13	11	11	4

29 July 20:05 (Report)
Muhamad Ashraf Haiqal Muhamad Rizal (MAS)	11	11	11	11	4
Mark-Anthony Dowell (BAR)	6	7	4	5	0

=== Pool P ===
Name	MP	MW	ML	GP	GW	GL	PW	PL
Kane Townsend (AUS)	2	2	0	8	8	0	89	53
Trevor Farley (BAR)	2	1	1	9	4	5	93	88
Christopher Marsh (JAM)	2	0	2	9	1	8	63	104

Qualified for the First round

29 July 16:35 (Report)
Kane Townsend (AUS)	11	11	11	11	4
Christopher Marsh (JAM)	7	5	4	4	0

29 July 18:20 (Report)
Trevor Farley (BAR)	11	11	16	11	11	4
Christopher Marsh (JAM)	7	3	14	13	6	1

29 July 20:05 (Report)
Kane Townsend (AUS)	12	11	11	11	4
Trevor Farley (BAR)	10	7	7	9	0

=== Pool Q ===
Name	MP	MW	ML	GP	GW	GL	PW	PL
Ashley Robinson (NIR)	2	2	0	9	8	1	97	39
Muhammad Rameez (PAK)	2	1	1	9	5	4	71	79
Omarie Ferdinand (LCA)	2	0	2	8	0	8	38	88

Qualified for the Second round

29 July 16:35 (Report)
Ashley Robinson (NIR)	11	11	11	9	11	4
Muhammad Rameez (PAK)	6	4	3	11	3	1

29 July 18:20 (Report)
Omarie Ferdinand (LCA)	8	6	8	4	0
Muhammad Rameez (PAK)	11	11	11	11	4

29 July 20:05 (Report)
Ashley Robinson (NIR)	11	11	11	11	4
Omarie Ferdinand (LCA)	1	4	3	4	0

=== Pool R ===
Name	MP	MW	ML	GP	GW	GL	PW	PL
Dinesh Deshappriya (SRI)	2	2	0	10	8	2	104	89
John Cordue (NZL)	2	1	1	10	5	5	91	99
Idi Lewis (GUY)	2	0	2	10	2	8	86	109

Qualified for the First round

29 July 16:35 (Report)
John Cordue (NZL)	11	9	9	7	7	1
Dinesh Deshappriya (SRI)	7	11	11	11	11	4

29 July 18:20 (Report)
Idi Lewis (GUY)	11	10	10	8	7	1
Dinesh Deshappriya (SRI)	7	12	12	11	11	4

29 July 20:05 (Report)
John Cordue (NZL)	9	11	11	11	14	4
Idi Lewis (GUY)	11	5	8	4	12	1

=== Pool S ===
Name	MP	MW	ML	GP	GW	GL	PW	PL
Sean Doherty (SCO)	2	2	0	8	8	0	88	36
Amoni Amaine Tumaini (TAN)	2	1	1	9	4	5	72	81
Kavir Gaymes Jr. (SVG)	2	0	2	9	1	8	55	98

Qualified for the First round

29 July 16:35 (Report)
Sean Doherty (SCO)	11	11	11	11	4
Amoni Amaine Tumaini (TAN)	3	5	1	9	0

29 July 18:20 (Report)
Kavir Gaymes Jr. (SVG)	5	4	11	11	6	1
Amoni Amaine Tumaini (TAN)	11	11	8	13	11	4

29 July 20:05 (Report)
Sean Doherty (SCO)	11	11	11	11	4
Kavir Gaymes Jr. (SVG)	3	5	6	4	0

=== Pool U ===
Name	MP	MW	ML	GP	GW	GL	PW	PL
Udaya Ranasingha (SRI)	2	2	0	8	8	0	89	45
Dario Laurence (SEY)	2	1	1	8	4	4	66	73
Teitua Beia (KIR)	2	0	2	8	0	8	51	88

Qualified for the First round

29 July 16:35 (Report)
Udaya Ranasingha (SRI)	12	11	11	11	4
Dario Laurence (SEY)	10	2	4	6	0

29 July 18:20 (Report)
Teitua Beia (KIR)	6	5	9	8	0
Dario Laurence (SEY)	11	11	11	11	4

29 July 20:05 (Report)
Udaya Ranasingha (SRI)	11	11	11	11	4
Teitua Beia (KIR)	6	8	3	6	0

=== Pool V ===
Name	MP	MW	ML	GP	GW	GL	PW	PL
Manash Chowdhury (BAN)	2	2	0	9	8	1	97	57
Paul Moody Mutambuze (UGA)	2	1	1	9	5	4	86	71
Alan Resture (TUV)	2	0	2	8	0	8	33	88

Qualified for the First round

29 July 16:35 (Report)
Manash Chowdhury (BAN)	11	7	11	13	11	4
Paul Moody Mutambuze (UGA)	9	11	3	11	8	1

29 July 18:20 (Report)
Alan Resture (TUV)	1	5	4	8	0
Paul Moody Mutambuze (UGA)	11	11	11	11	4

29 July 20:05 (Report)
Manash Chowdhury (BAN)	11	11	11	11	4
Alan Resture (TUV)	6	5	3	1	0

=== Pool W ===
Name	MP	MW	ML	GP	GW	GL	PW	PL
Kane Watson (JAM)	2	2	0	9	8	1	98	62
Anthony Mathenge Ringui (KEN)	2	1	1	9	5	4	86	74
Dane Taylor (DMA)	2	0	2	8	0	8	40	88

Qualified for the First round

29 July 16:35 (Report)
Kane Watson (JAM)	7	11	14	11	11	4
Anthony Mathenge Ringui (KEN)	11	8	12	5	6	1

29 July 18:20 (Report)
Dane Taylor (DMA)	4	8	3	5	0
Anthony Mathenge Ringui (KEN)	11	11	11	11	4

29 July 20:05 (Report)
Kane Watson (JAM)	11	11	11	11	4
Dane Taylor (DMA)	9	2	2	7

=== Pool X ===
Name	MP	MW	ML	GP	GW	GL	PW	PL
Curtis Humphreys (TTO)	2	2	0	8	8	0	88	41
Nicholas Esther (SEY)	2	1	1	9	4	5	72	79
Massoud Issa Mtalaso (TAN)	2	0	2	9	1	8	55	95

Qualified for the First round

29 July 17:10 (Report)
Curtis Humphreys (TTO)	11	11	11	11	4
Massoud Issa Mtalaso (TAN)	5	4	4	7	0

29 July 18:55 (Report)
Nicholas Esther (SEY)	11	11	7	11	11	4
Massoud Issa Mtalaso (TAN)	6	7	11	3	8	1

29 July 20:40 (Report)
Curtis Humphreys (TTO)	11	11	11	11	4
Nicholas Esther (SEY)	8	3	2	8	0

=== Pool Z ===
Name	MP	MW	ML	GP	GW	GL	PW	PL
Felix Lartey (GHA)	2	2	0	8	8	0	88	52
Moosa Ahmed (MDV)	2	1	1	10	4	6	92	97
Choy Freddy (KIR)	2	0	2	10	2	8	78	109

Qualified for the First round

29 July 17:10 (Report)
Felix Lartey (GHA)	11	11	11	11	4
Moosa Ahmed (MDV)	4	6	8	9	0

29 July 18:55 (Report)
Choy Freddy (KIR)	11	5	12	8	11	6	2
Moosa Ahmed (MDV)	13	11	10	11	9	11	4

29 July 20:40 (Report)
Felix Lartey (GHA)	11	11	11	11	4
Choy Freddy (KIR)	9	9	6	1	0

=== Pool AA ===
Name	MP	MW	ML	GP	GW	GL	PW	PL
Paul David (GUY)	2	2	0	11	8	3	113	49
Yoshua Shing (VAN)	2	1	1	11	7	4	108	41
Geoffrey Loi (PNG)	2	0	2	8	0	8	32	88

Qualified for the First round

29 July 17:10 (Report)
Yoshua Shing (VAN)	11	11	11	11	4
Geoffrey Loi (PNG)	6	3	4	3	0

29 July 18:55 (Report)
Paul David (GUY)	11	11	11	11	4
Geoffrey Loi (PNG)	5	1	4	6	0

29 July 20:40 (Report)
Yoshua Shing (VAN)	11	11	11	9	5	9	8	3
Paul David (GUY)	9	9	7	11	11	11	11	4

=== Pool AB ===
Name	MP	MW	ML	GP	GW	GL	PW	PL
Peter Graham (NIR)	2	2	0	8	8	0	88	43
Samuel Morris (SLE)	2	1	1	11	4	7	91	104
Jedaiah Pierre (LCA)	2	0	2	11	3	8	79	111

Qualified for the First round

29 July 17:10 (Report)
Peter Graham (NIR)	11	11	11	11	4
Samuel Morris (SLE)	5	9	5	5	0

29 July 18:55 (Report)
Jedaiah Pierre (LCA)	11	4	9	8	12	11	5	3
Samuel Morris (SLE)	5	11	11	11	10	8	11	4

29 July 20:40 (Report)
Paul Graham (NIR)	11	11	11	11	4
Jedaiah Pierre (LCA)	0	4	6	9	0

=== Pool AC ===
Name	MP	MW	ML	GP	GW	GL	PW	PL
Simon Tomlinson (JAM)	2	2	0	9	8	1	92	48
Billy Chan Yook Fo (MRI)	2	1	1	8	4	4	78	65
Yahya Hassan Mungilwa (TAN)	2	0	2	9	1	8	46	92

Qualified for the First round

29 July 17:10 (Report)
Simon Tomlinson (JAM)	11	4	11	11	11	4
Yahya Hassan Mungilwa (TAN)	5	11	2	4	3	1

29 July 18:55 (Report)
Billy Chan Yook Fo (MRI)	11	11	11	11	4
Yahya Hassan Mungilwa (TAN)	4	6	6	5	0

29 July 20:40 (Report)
Simon Tomlinson (JAM)	11	12	12	11	4
Billy Chan Yook Fo (MRI)	7	10	10	7	0

=== Pool AD ===
Name	MP	MW	ML	GP	GW	GL	PW	PL
Akhilen Yogarajah (MRI)	2	2	0	9	8	1	97	40
Abel Somba (MAW)	2	1	1	9	5	4	69	79
Javier de Shong (SVG)	2	0	2	8	0	8	42	89

Qualified for the First round

29 July 17:10 (Report)
Akhilen Yogarajah (MRI)	11	11	11	11	4
Javier de Shong (SVG)	3	5	5	3	0

29 July 18:55 (Report)
Abel Somba (MAW)	11	12	11	11	4
Javier de Shong (SVG)	7	10	4	5	0

29 July 20:40 (Report)
Akhilen Yogarajah (MRI)	11	9	11	11	11	4
Abel Somba (MAW)	1	11	1	9	2	1

=== Pool AE ===
Name	MP	MW	ML	GP	GW	GL	PW	PL
Emmanuel Commey (GHA)	2	2	0	10	8	2	88	37
Javed Ahmed (BAN)	2	1	1	11	4	7	67	102
Brian Chan Yook Fo (MRI)	2	0	2	8	0	8	121	127

Qualified for the First round

29 July 17:10 (Report)
Brian Chan Yook Fo (MRI)	11	10	11	8	11	3	2
Emmanuel Commey (GHA)	7	12	7	11	13	11	4

29 July 18:55 (Report)
Javed Ahmed (BAN)	5	4	10	4	0
Emmanuel Commey (GHA)	11	11	12	11	4

29 July 20:40 (Report)
Brian Chan Yook Fo (MRI)	11	11	9	5	13	8	12	3
Javed Ahmed (BAN)	5	9	11	11	11	11	14	4

=== Pool AF ===
Name	MP	MW	ML	GP	GW	GL	PW	PL
Derek Abrefa (GHA)	2	2	0	8	8	0	88	53
Ham Lulu (VAN)	2	1	1	8	4	4	73	66
Maizar Adam Zahir (MDV)	2	0	2	8	0	8	46	88

Qualified for the First round

29 July 17:10 (Report)
Derek Abrefa (GHA)	11	11	11	11	4
Maizar Adam Zaihar (MDV)	7	8	6	3	0

29 July 18:55 (Report)
Ham Lulu (VAN)	11	11	11	11	4
Maizar Adam Zaihar (MDV)	4	9	6	3	0

29 July 20:40 (Report)
Derek Abrefa (GHA)	11	11	11	11	4
Ham Lulu (VAN)	9	9	3	8	0

=== Pool AG ===
Name	MP	MW	ML	GP	GW	GL	PW	PL
Daniel O'Connell (WAL)	2	2	0	8	8	0	90	51
Aaron Wilson (TTO)	2	1	1	8	4	4	73	76
Tabish Khurshid (PAK)	2	0	2	8	0	8	50	88

Qualified for the First round

29 July 17:10 (Report)
Daniel O'Connell (WAL)	11	11	11	11	4
Tabish Khurshid (PAK)	8	6	5	2	0

29 July 18:55 (Report)
Aaron Wilson (TTO)	11	11	11	11	4
Tabish Khurshid (PAK)	5	9	6	9	0

29 July 20:40 (Report)
Daniel O'Connell (WAL)	11	12	13	11	4
Aaron Wilson (TTO)	1	10	11	7	0

== Main draw ==
=== Top half ===
==== Section 1 ====
First round 31 July 12:00
26	Derek Abrefa (GHA)	11	2	13	10	6	8
77	Phillip Xiao (NZL)	7	11	11	12	11	11
127	Stephen Jenkins (WAL)	11	11	9	11	11
115	Curtis Humphreys (TTO)	3	7	11	3	9
105	Udaya Ranasingha (SRI)	5	11	4	7	11	9
15	Andre Ho (CAN)	11	9	11	11	8	11

Second round 31 July 19:30
95	Gao Ning (SIN)	11	11	11	11
77	Phillip Xiao (NZL)	6	3	8	9
127	Stephen Jenkins (WAL)	6	4	3	1
68	Quadri Aruna (NGR)	11	11	11	11
88	Gavin Rumgay (SCO)	11	11	11	9	15
15	Andre Ho (CAN)	8	8	9	11	13
58	Muhamad Ashraf Haiqal Muhamad Rizal (MAS)	4	11	13	9	11	7
1	William Henzell (AUS)	11	4	11	11	13	11

Third round 01 August 10:10
95	Gao Ning (SIN)	11	11	11	11
68	Quadri Aruna (NGR)	7	4	9	9
88	Gavin Rumgay (SCO)	7	11	9	8	13
1	William Henzell (AUS)	11	7	11	11	15

Quarterfinals; 01 August 16:00
95	Gao Ning (SIN)	15	11	9	11	11
1	William Henzell (AUS)	13	3	11	7	6

==== Section 2 ====
First round 31 July 12:00,50
40	Simon Tomlinson (JAM)	11	4	8	7	10
104	Rohan Sirisena (SRI)	5	11	11	11	12
16	Pierre-Luc Thériault (CAN)	11	11	11	11
128	Daniel O'Connell (WAL)	9	5	5	6
25	Felix Lartey (GHA)	8	10	6	11	8
57	Leong Chee Feng (MAS)	11	12	11	7	11
73	Paul McCreery (NIR)	11	11	11	11
90	Sean Doherty (SCO)	9	6	3	8

Second round 31 July 19:30
97	Li Hu (SIN)	11	11	11	11
104	Rohan Sirisena (SRI)	2	4	7	5
16	Pierre-Luc Thériault (CAN)	11	10	6	7
35	Soumyajit Ghosh (IND)	13	12	11	11
70	Bode Abiodun (NGR)	11	11	11	12
57	Leong Chee Feng (MAS)	2	9	9	10
73	Paul McCreery (NIR)	5	5	8	7
20	Liam Pitchford (ENG)	11	11	11	11

Third round 01 August 10:10
97	Li Hu (SIN)	5	11	2	9	9
35	Soumyajit Ghosh (IND)	11	2	11	11	11
70	Bode Abiodun (NGR)	6	5	7	10
20	Liam Pitchford (ENG)	11	11	11	12

Quarterfinals; 01 August 16:00
35	Soumyajit Ghosh (IND)	11	7	11	7	10	9
20	Liam Pitchford (ENG)	7	11	9	11	12	11

=== Bottom half ===
==== Section 1 ====
First round 31 July 12:50
3	Kane Townsend (AUS)	11	11	11	11
30	Paul David (GUY)	3	9	5	9
106	Dinesh Deshappriya (SRI)	8	6	5	9
89	Craig Howieson (SCO)	11	11	11	11
76	Liu Tengteng (NZL)	11	11	11	11
27	Emmanuel Commey (GHA)	4	9	9	7

Second round 31 July 20:20
34	Sharath Kamal (IND)	11	11	11	11
74	Ashley Robinson (NIR)	7	4	6	5
3	Kane Townsend (AUS)	11	5	7	10	7
69	Segun Toriola (NGR)	7	11	11	12	11
126	Ryan Jenkins (WAL)	11	11	11	11
89	Craig Howieson (SCO)	3	8	8	7
76	Liu Tengteng (NZL)	3	4	4	11	9
21	Paul Drinkhall (ENG)	11	11	11	3	11

Third round 01 August 10:10
34	Sharath Kamal (IND)	11	11	11	11
69	Segun Toriola (NGR)	5	6	7	4
126	Ryan Jenkins (WAL)	10	9	10	7
21	Paul Drinkhall (ENG)	12	11	12	11

Quarterfinals; 01 August 16:45
34	Sharath Kamal (IND)	11	11	12	9	11
21	Paul Drinkhall (ENG)	7	6	10	11	6

==== Section 2 ====
First round 31 July 12:50
39	Kane Watson (JAM)	12	5	9	4	2
17	Marios Yiangou (CYP)	10	11	11	11	11
56	Muhd Shakirin Ibrahim (MAS)	11	11	11	12
6	Manash Chowdhury (BAN)	6	4	9	10
65	Akhilen Yogarajah (MRI)	14	4	9	11	7
2	David Powell (AUS)	16	11	11	4	11
114	Dexter St. Louis (TTO)	11	10	8	11	11	11
75	Paul Graham (NIR)	8	12	11	5	8	9

Second round 31 July 20:20
14	Eugene Wang (CAN)	19	11	6	11	12
17	Marios Yiangou (CYP)	17	9	11	6	10
56	Muhd Shakirin Ibrahim (MAS)	8	5	7	6
22	Andrew Baggaley (ENG)	11	11	11	11
36	Harmeet Desai (IND)	11	7	11	9	11	11	11
2	David Powell (AUS)	4	11	13	11	6	3	5
114	Dexter St. Louis (TTO)	5	5	3	9
96	Zhan Jian (SIN)	11	11	11	11

Third round 01 August 10:10
14	Eugene Wang (CAN)	11	11	12	11
22	Andrew Baggaley (ENG)	5	8	10	8
36	Harmeet Desai (IND)	12	6	10	11
96	Zhan Jian (SIN)	14	11	12	13

Quarterfinals; 01 August 16:45
14	Eugene Wang (CAN)	11	11	7	8	5	8
96	Zhan Jian (SIN)	9	1	11	11	11	11

== Finals ==
Semifinals; 02 August 10:50, 11:40
95	Gao Ning (SIN)	11	11	14	6	10	11	11
20	Liam Pitchford (ENG)	8	13	12	11	12	7	6
34	Sharath Kamal (IND)	6	6	6	8
96	Zhan Jian (SIN)	11	11	11	11

Gold medal match 02 August 19:10
95	Gao Ning (SIN)	9	2	7	11	7
96	Zhan Jian (SIN)	11	11	11	6	11
Bronze medal match 02 August 18:20
20	Liam Pitchford (ENG)	11	11	4	11	6	12
34	Sharath Kamal (IND)	6	8	11	9	11	10
