= Table tennis at the 2014 Commonwealth Games – Men's team =

Table Tennis – Men's team at the 2014 Commonwealth Games
- Venue: Scotstoun Sports Campus, Glasgow
- Dates: 24–28 July 2014
- Competitors: 109 from 28 nations

Medalists
gold medal	Clarence Chew; Gao Ning; Li Hu; Yang Zi*; Zhan Jian	Singapore
silver medal	Andrew Baggaley; Paul Drinkhall; Liam Pitchford; Daniel Reed; Sam Walker*	England
bronze medal	Bode Abiodun; Quadri Aruna; Jide Ogidiolu; Ojo Onaolapo; Segun Toriola	Nigeria

The Men's team table tennis event at the 2014 Commonwealth Games was held from 24 July to 28 July at the Scotstoun Sports Campus in Glasgow.

== Group stage ==
=== Pool A ===
Team	MP	MW	ML	GP	GW	GL	PW	PL	PT
Singapore	3	3	0	9	9	0	27	0	6
Sri Lanka	3	2	1	10	6	4	19	13	5
Ghana	3	1	2	9	3	6	13	20	4
Seychelles	3	0	3	9	0	9	1	27	3

Qualified for the quarterfinals
Qualified for the first rounds
Qualified for the classification first rounds

24 July 2014; 11:10	Singapore	3–0	Ghana	Scotstoun Sports Campus, Glasgow

report	Individual matches
Gao Ning	3–0	Emmanuel Commey	11–4, 11–7, 11–6
Zhan Jian	3–0	Felix Lartey	11-9, 11-8, 11-6
Li Hu/Gao Ning	3–0	Derek Abrefa/Felix Lartey	11-7, 11-4, 11-6

24 July 2014; 11:10	Sri Lanka	3–0	Seychelles	Scotstoun Sports Campus, Glasgow

report	Individual matches
Rohan Sirisena	3–0	Nicholas Esther	11-5, 11-4, 11-7
Dinesh Deshappriya	3–0	Godfrey Sultan	11-7, 11-7, 11-6
Udaya Ranasingha/Dinesh Deshappriya	3–0	Dario Laurence/Nicholas Esther	11-4, 11-1, 11-7

24 July 2014; 17:40	Singapore	3–0	Sri Lanka	Scotstoun Sports Campus, Glasgow

report	Individual matches
Zhan Jian	3–0	Nirmala Jayasinghe	11-5, 11-6, 11-2
Li Hu	3–0	Rohan Sirisena	11-7, 11-3, 11-3
Clarence Chew/Li Hu	3–0	Udaya Ranasingha/Nirmala Jayasinghe	11-4, 11-6, 11-9

24 July 2014; 17:40	Ghana	3–0	Seychelles	Scotstoun Sports Campus, Glasgow

report	Individual matches
Felix Lartey	3–0	Godfrey Sultan	11-3, 11-8, 11-9
Emmanuel Commey	3–0	Nicholas Esther	11-7, 13-11, 11-8
Derek Abrefa/Felix Lartey	3–1	Dario Laurence/Godfrey Sultan	11-7, 7-11, 11-4, 11-5

25 July 2014; 11:10	Singapore	3–0	Seychelles	Scotstoun Sports Campus, Glasgow

report	Individual matches
Gao Ning	3–0	Godfrey Sultan	11-6, 11-2, 11-4
Eugene Wang	3–0	Dario Laurence	11-3, 11-6, 11-6
Li Hu/Gao Ning	3–0	Nicholas Esther/Godfrey Sultan	11-3, 11-3, 11-8

25 July 2014; 11:10	Sri Lanka	3–1	Ghana	Scotstoun Sports Campus, Glasgow

report	Individual matches
Dinesh Deshappriya	3–0	Emmanuel Corney	11-5, 11-4, 11-8
Rohan Sirisena	3–1	Felix Lartey	12-10, 12-10, 6-11, 11-9
Udaya Ranasingha/Dinesh Deshappriya	1–3	Derek Abrefa/Felix Lartey	5-11, 11-8, 7-11, 4-11
Udaya Ranasingha	3–0	Emmanuel Corney	11-6, 11-4, 11-4

=== Pool B ===
Team	MP	MW	ML	GP	GW	GL	PW	PL	PT
England	3	3	0	9	9	0	27	0	6
Barbados	3	2	1	12	6	6	22	23	5
Trinidad and Tobago	3	1	2	11	4	7	15	24	4
Jamaica	3	0	3	12	3	9	13	31	3

Qualified for the quarterfinals
Qualified for the first rounds
Qualified for the classification first rounds

24 July 2014; 12:50	England	3–0	Jamaica	Scotstoun Sports Campus, Glasgow

report	Individual matches
Paul Drinkhall	3–0	Simon Tomlinson	11-7, 11-8, 11-4
Liam Pitchford	3–0	Kane Watson	11-8, 11-7, 11-7
Andrew Baggaley/Paul Drinkhall	3–0	Christopher Marsh/Simon Tomlinson	11-5, 11-4, 11-3

24 July 2014; 12:50	Trinidad and Tobago	1–3	Barbados	Scotstoun Sports Campus, Glasgow

report	Individual matches
Curtis Humphreys	1–3	Mark-Anthony Dowell	9-11, 7-11, 11-9, 10-12
Dexter St. Louis	3–1	Kevin Farley	8-11, 11-6, 11-9, 11-5
Aaron Wilson/Dexter St. Louis	0–3	Trevor Farley/Mark-Anthony Dowell	9-11, 8-11, 1-11
Aaron Wilson	1–3	Kevin Farley	9-11, 11-7, 6-11, 10-12

24 July 2014; 17:40	England	3–0	Trinidad and Tobago	Scotstoun Sports Campus, Glasgow

report	Individual matches
Paul Drinkhall	3–0	Curtis Humphreys	11-8, 11-3, 11-3
Liam Pitchford	3–0	Dexter St. Louis	12-10, 11-3, 11-9
Daniel Reed/Paul Drinkhall	3–0	Aaron Wilson/Curtis Humphreys	11-1, 11-6, 11-8

24 July 2014; 17:40	Jamaica	2–3	Barbados	Scotstoun Sports Campus, Glasgow

report	Individual matches
Kane Watson	3–1	Mark-Anthony Dowell	8-11, 11-7, 11-7, 11-8
Simon Tomlinson	0–3	Kevin Farley	4-11, 14-16, 4-11
Christopher Marsh/Simon Tomlinson	3–2	Trevor Farley/Kevin Farley	11-8, 11-6, 2-11, 8-11, 11-3
Kane Watson	1–3	Trevor Farley	10-12, 4-11, 11-8, 11-6
Christopher Marsh	2–3	Kevin Farley	6-11, 11-9, 6-11, 11-7, 3-11

25 July 2014; 11:10	England	3–0	Barbados	Scotstoun Sports Campus, Glasgow

report	Individual matches
Liam Pitchford	3–0	Trevor Farley	11-6, 11-5, 11-5
Andrew Baggaley	3–0	Kevin Farley	11-2, 11-1, 16-14
Paul Drinkhall/Andrew Baggaley	3–0	Mark-Anthony Dowell/Trevor Farley	11-4, 11-2, 11-5

25 July 2014; 11:10	Trinidad and Tobago	3–1	Jamaica	Scotstoun Sports Campus, Glasgow

report	Individual matches
Dexter St. Louis	3–0	Simon Tomlinson	11-3, 11-7, 12-10
Curtis Humphreys	1–3	Kane Watson	11-9, 8-11, 9-11, 11-13
Aaron Wilson/Curtis Humphreys	3–1	Christopher Marsh/Simon Tomlinson	11-7, 13-15, 12-10, 11-7
Dexter St. Louis	3–1	Christopher Marsh	11-6, 6-11, 18-16, 11-4

=== Pool C ===
Team	MP	MW	ML	GP	GW	GL	PW	PL	PT
India	3	3	0	9	9	0	27	3	6
Northern Ireland	3	2	1	9	6	3	20	11	5
Guyana	3	1	2	9	3	6	9	21	4
Vanuatu	3	0	3	9	0	9	6	27	3

Qualified for the first rounds
Qualified for the classification quarterfinals
Qualified for the classification first rounds

24 July 2014; 11:10	India	3–0	Vanuatu	Scotstoun Sports Campus, Glasgow

report	Individual matches
Harmeet Desai	3–0	Ham Lulu	11-2, 11-3, 11-5
Sanil Shankar Shetty	3–1	Yoshua Shing	11-6, 11-2, 7-11, 11-1
Amalraj Anthony Arputharaj/Sanil Shankar Shetty	3–0	Alan Lin/Yoshua Shing	11-6, 11-5, 11-4

24 July 2014; 11:10	Northern Ireland	3–0	Guyana	Scotstoun Sports Campus, Glasgow

report	Individual matches
Paul McCreery	3–0	Paul David	12-10, 11-8, 11-3
Ashley Robinson	3–0	Christopher Franklin	11-9, 11-7, 11-6
Peter Graham/Ashley Robinson	3–0	Shamar Britton/Christopher Franklin	11-2, 11-5, 14-12

24 July 2014; 17:40	India	3–0	Northern Ireland	Scotstoun Sports Campus, Glasgow

report	Individual matches
Sharath Kamal	3–0	Paul McCreery	11-9, 12-10, 11-8
Soumyajit Ghosh	3–2	Ashley Robinson	12-14, 10-12, 11-5, 11-5, 11-9
Harmeet Desai/Soumyajit Ghosh	3–0	Peter Graham/Ashley Robinson	11-2, 11-5, 11-6

24 July 2014; 17:40	Vanuatu	0–3	Guyana	Scotstoun Sports Campus, Glasgow

report	Individual matches
Yoshua Shing	2–3	Paul David	12-10, 5-11, 7-11, 11-7, 6-11
Alan Lin	1–3	Christopher Franklin	11-7, 4-11, 1-11, 4-11
Ham Lulu/Yoshua Shing	0–3	Idi Lewis/Paul David	7-11, 6-11, 6-11

25 July 2014; 11:10	India	3–0	Guyana	Scotstoun Sports Campus, Glasgow

report	Individual matches
Amalraj Anthony Arputharaj	3–0	Shamar Britton	11-4, 11-3, 11-3
Soumyajit Ghosh	3–0	Christopher Franklin	11-8, 11-5, 11-9
Sanil Shankar Shetty/Amalraj Anthony Arputharaj	3–0	Paul David/Christopher Franklin	11-8, 11-6, 11-5

25 July 2014; 11:10	Northern Ireland	3–0	Vanuatu	Scotstoun Sports Campus, Glasgow

report	Individual matches
Paul McCreery	3–0	Samuel Saul	11-1, 11-5, 11-7
Ashley Robinson	3–0	Yoshua Shing	11-5, 11-9, 11-3
Paul Graham/Ashley Robinson	3–2	Ham Lulu/Yoshua Shing	10-12, 7-11, 12-10, 11-9, 11-2

=== Pool D ===
Team	MP	MW	ML	GP	GW	GL	PW	PL	PT
Nigeria	3	3	0	10	9	1	28	3	6
Mauritius	3	2	1	10	7	3	24	20	5
Bangladesh	3	1	2	12	5	7	20	24	4
Kiribati	3	0	3	7	1	6	3	28	3

Qualified for the first rounds
Qualified for the classification quarterfinals
Qualified for the classification first rounds

24 July 2014; 11:10	Nigeria	3–0	Bangladesh	Scotstoun Sports Campus, Glasgow

report	Individual matches
Quadri Aruna	3–0	Manash Chowdhury	11-1, 11-3, 11-5
Segun Toriola	3–0	Mahmub Billah	11-8, 11-3, 11-7
Ojo Onaolapo/Quadri Aruna	3–0	Javed Ahmed/Mahmub Billah	11-6, 11-6, 11-5

24 July 2014; 11:10	Mauritius	3–0	Kiribati	Scotstoun Sports Campus, Glasgow

report	Individual matches
Akhilen Yogarajah	3–0	Katirakei Tetabo	11-6, 11-4, 11-3
Brian Chan Yook Fo	3–0	Choy Freddy	11-8, 11-7, 11-7
Billy Chan Yook Fo/Brian Chan Yook Fo	3–0	Teitua Beia/Choy Freddy	11-2, 11-4, 11-7

24 July 2014; 17:40	Nigeria	3–1	Mauritius	Scotstoun Sports Campus, Glasgow

report	Individual matches
Ojo Onaolupo	1–3	Akhilen Yogarajah	10-12, 12-10, 6-11, 7-11
Quadri Aruna	3–0	Brian Chan Yook Fo	11-5, 11-4, 11-6
Segun Toriola/Quadri Aruna	3–0	Billy Chan Yook Fo/Brian Chan Yook Fo	11-1, 11-6, 11-4
Segun Toriola	3–0	Akhilen Yogarajah	11-9, 11-6, 11-6

24 July 2014; 17:40	Bangladesh	3–1	Kiribati	Scotstoun Sports Campus, Glasgow

report	Individual matches
Javed Ahmed	1–3	Choy Freddy	11-4, 7-11, 7-11, 10-12
Manash Chowdhury	3–0	Teitua Beia	11-1, 11-3, 11-3
Mahmub Billah/Javed Ahmed	3–0	Katirakei Tetabo/Teitua Beia	11-5, 11-8, 11-9
Mahmub Billah	3–0	Choy Freddy	11-9, 11-1, 11-2

25 July 2014; 11:10	Nigeria	3–0	Kiribati	Scotstoun Sports Campus, Glasgow

report	Individual matches
Bode Abiodun	3–0	Choy Freddy	11-3, 11-1, 11-1
Ojo Onaolupo	3–0	Katirakei Tetabo	11-3, 11-2, 11-2
Jide Ogidiolu/Bode Abiodun	3–0	Teitua Beia/Choy Freddy	11-3, 11-1, 11-3

25 July 2014; 11:10	Mauritius	3–2	Bangladesh	Scotstoun Sports Campus, Glasgow

report	Individual matches
Akhilen Yogarajah	3–0	Mahmub Billah	11-9, 11-4, 13-11
Brian Chan Yook Fo	3–2	Manash Chowdhury	9-11, 11-9, 11-2, 6-11, 11-5
Billy Chan Yook Fo/Brian Chan Yook Fo	2–3	Javed Ahmed/Mahmub Billah	11-6, 14-16, 9-11, 11-9, 5-11
Billy Chan Yook Fo	1–3	Manash Chowdhury	10-12, 11-6, 6-11, 9-11
Akhilen Yogarajah	3–2	Javed Ahmed	11-5, 13-15, 11-7, 8-11, 11-7

=== Pool E ===
Team	MP	MW	ML	GP	GW	GL	PW	PL	PT
Scotland	3	3	0	10	9	1	28	7	6
Canada	3	2	1	10	7	3	25	10	5
Uganda	3	1	2	10	3	7	9	21	4
Tanzania	3	0	3	10	1	9	3	27	3

Qualified for the first rounds
Qualified for the classification first rounds

24 July 2014; 11:10	Canada	3–0	Tanzania	Scotstoun Sports Campus, Glasgow

report	Individual matches
Eugene Wang	3–0	Masoud Issa Mtalaso	11-5, 11-3, 11-1
Andre Ho	3–0	Amoni Amaine Tumaini	11-4, 11-3, 11-1
Pierre-Luc Thériault/Eugene Wang	3–0	Yahya Hassan Mungilwa/Masoud Issa Mtalaso	11-2, 11-3, 11-1

24 July 2014; 11:10	Scotland	3–0	Uganda	Scotstoun Sports Campus, Glasgow

report	Individual matches
Gavin Rumgay	3–0	Kevin Evans Mafabi	11-6, 11-7, 11-1
Craig Howieson	3–0	Paul Moody Mutambuze	11-2, 11-2, 11-6
Sean Doherty/Craig Howieson	3–0	Gilton Chelibe/Kevin Evans Mafabi	11-2, 11-4, 11-7

24 July 2014; 19:20	Canada	1–3	Scotland	Scotstoun Sports Campus, Glasgow

report	Individual matches
Andre Ho	0–3	Gavin Rumgay	8-11, 7-11, 4-11
Eugene Wang	3–1	Sean Doherty	8-11, 11-5, 11-9, 12-10
Pierre-Luc Thériault/Andre Ho	2–3	Craig Howieson/Sean Doherty	6-11, 11-9, 11-4, 7-11, 9-11
Pierre-Luc Thériault	2–3	Gavin Rumgay	11-6, 11-4, 9-11, 10-12, 2-11

24 July 2014; 19:20	Tanzania	0–3	Uganda	Scotstoun Sports Campus, Glasgow

report	Individual matches
Yahya Hassan Mungilwa	2–3	Gilton Chelibe	5-11, 11-7, 5-11, 7-11, 5-11
Amoni Amaini Tumaini	0–3	Kevin Evans Mafabi	7-11, 9-11, 6-11
Masoud Issa Mtalaso/Amoni Amaini Tumaini	1–3	Paul Moody Mutambuze/Kevin Evans Mafabi	8-11, 7-11, 15-13, 3-11

25 July 2014; 12:50	Canada	3–0	Uganda	Scotstoun Sports Campus, Glasgow

report	Individual matches
Eugene Wang	3–0	Kevin Evans Mafabi	11-5, 11-3, 11-4
Pierre-Luc Thériault	3–0	Gilton Chelibe	11-5, 11-1, 11-1
Andre Ho/Pierre-Luc Thériault	3–0	Paul Moody Mutambuze/Kevin Evans Mafabi	11-2, 11-5, 11-6

25 July 2014; 12:50	Scotland	3–0	Tanzania	Scotstoun Sports Campus, Glasgow

report	Individual matches
Craig Howieson	3–0	Amoni Amaini Tumaini	11-5, 11-3, 11-4
Gary Rumgay	3–0	Yahya Hassan Mubgilwa	11-5, 11-1, 11-1
Sean Doherty/Craig Howieson	3–0	Masoud Issa Mtalaso/Amoni Amaini Tumaini	11-8, 11-3, 11-5

=== Pool F ===
Team	MP	MW	ML	GP	GW	GL	PW	PL	PT
Australia	3	3	0	11	9	2	31	7	6
Malaysia	3	2	1	11	8	3	25	13	5
Saint Lucia	3	1	2	10	3	7	11	22	4
Zambia	3	0	3	10	1	9	3	29	3

Qualified for the first rounds
Qualified for the classification first rounds

24 July 2014; 12:50	Australia	3–0	Saint Lucia	Scotstoun Sports Campus, Glasgow

report	Individual matches
William Henzell	3–0	Omarie Ferdinand	11-2, 11-3, 11-5
Kane Townsend	3–0	Adrian Albert	11-5, 11-6, 11-1
Hu Heming/Kane Townsend	3–0	Chris Wells/Adrian Albert	11-9, 11-6, 11-6

24 July 2014; 12:50	Malaysia	3–0	Zambia	Scotstoun Sports Campus, Glasgow

report	Individual matches
Muhd Shakirin Ibrahim	3–0	Friday Ng'andu	11-4, 11-6, 11-2
Muhamad Ashraf Haiqal Muhamad Rizal	3–0	Simasiku Kalaluka	11-7, 11-1, 11-8
Leong Chee Feng/Muhd Shakirin Ibrahim	3–0	Noel Kasanda/Simasiku Kalaluka	11-6, 11-3, 11-6

24 July 2014; 19:20	Australia	3–2	Malaysia	Scotstoun Sports Campus, Glasgow

report	Individual matches
William Henzell	3–0	Muhd Shakirin Ibrahim	12-10, 11-9, 11-3
Yan Xin	3–1	Muhamad Ashraf Haiqal Muhamad Rizal	11-9, 4-11, 11-1, 11-9
David Powell/Yan Xin	2–3	Dunley Foo/Muhd Shakirin Ibrahim	11-6, 5-11, 11-7, 8-11, 9-11
David Powell	2–3	Muhamad Ashraf Haiqal Muhamad Rizal	11-4, 3-11, 6-11, 13-11, 5-11
William Henzell	3–0	Dunley Foo	11-2, 12-10, 11-5

24 July 2014; 19:20	Saint Lucia	3–1	Zambia	Scotstoun Sports Campus, Glasgow

report	Individual matches
Chris Wells	3–1	Friday Ng'andu	8-11, 11-5, 12-10, 11-9
Adrian Albert	3–0	Simasiku Kalaluka	11-8, 11-5, 11-3
Omarie Ferdinand/Chris Wells	2–3	Noel Kasanda/Friday Ng'andu	9-11, 11-6, 8-11, 12-10, 6-11
Adrian Albert	3–0	Noel Kasanda	12-10, 11-9, 11-9

25 July 2014; 12:50	Australia	3–0	Zambia	Scotstoun Sports Campus, Glasgow

report	Individual matches
Hu Heming	3–0	Simasiku Kalaluka	11-5, 11-5, 11-6
David Powell	3–0	Friday Ng'anda	11-6, 11-4, 11-4
Yan Xin/David Powell	3–0	Noel Kasanda/Friday Ng'anda	11-1, 11-4, 11-5

25 July 2014; 12:50	Malaysia	3–0	Saint Lucia	Scotstoun Sports Campus, Glasgow

report	Individual matches
Muhd Shakirin Ibrahim	3–0	Jedaiah Pierre	11-2, 11-3, 11-4
Dunley Foo	3–0	Adrian Albert	11-6, 11-7, 11-7
Leong Chee Feng/Dunley Foo	3–0	Chris Wells/Adrian Albert	14-12, 11-9, 11-3

=== Pool G ===
Team	MP	MW	ML	GP	GW	GL	PW	PL	PT
Wales	3	3	0	11	9	2	30	10	6
New Zealand	3	2	1	11	8	3	28	12	5
Kenya	3	1	2	9	3	6	9	19	4
Papua New Guinea	3	0	3	9	0	9	1	27	3

Qualified for the first rounds
Qualified for the classification first rounds

24 July 2014; 12:50	New Zealand	3–0	Kenya	Scotstoun Sports Campus, Glasgow

report	Individual matches
Liu Tengteng	3–0	Peter Muturi	11-7, 11-4, 11-7
Phillip Xiao	3–0	Anthony Mathenge Ringui	11-7, 11-3, 11-7
Shane Laugesen/Phillip Xiao	3–0	Michael Owuor Otieno/Anthony Mathenge Ringui	11-3, 11-8, 11-2

24 July 2014; 12:50	Wales	3–0	Papua New Guinea	Scotstoun Sports Campus, Glasgow

report	Individual matches
Stephen Jenkins	3–0	Geoffrey Loi	11-3, 11-2, 11-4
Ryan Jenkins	3–0	David Loi	11-3, 11-2, 11-2
Daniel O'Connell/Stephen Jenkins	3–0	Gasika Sepa Simoi/David Loi	11-4, 11-2, 11-5

24 July 2014; 19:20	New Zealand	2–3	Wales	Scotstoun Sports Campus, Glasgow

report	Individual matches
Phillip Xiao	3–1	Daniel O'Connell	11-5, 11-8, 9-11, 11-7
Liu Tengteng	3–2	Ryan Jenkins	4-11, 9-11, 11-9, 12-10, 11-6
Shane Laugesen/Phillip Xiao	1–3	Stephen Jenkins/Daniel O'Connell	10-12, 11-8, 4-11, 8-11
Liu Tengteng	2–3	Stephen Jenkins	11-6, 13-11, 8-11, 7-11, 7-11
Shane Laugesen	1–3	Ryan Jenkins	11-6, 7-11, 17-19, 7-11

24 July 2014; 19:20	Kenya	3–0	Papua New Guinea	Scotstoun Sports Campus, Glasgow

report	Individual matches
Peter Muturi	3–0	Gasika Sepa Simoi	11-6, 11-5, 11-4
Anthony Mathenge Ringui	3–1	Geoffrey Loi	11-7, 7-11, 11-4, 11-5
Michael Owuor Otieno/Anthony Mathenge Ringui	3–0	Boe Mea/Gasika Sepa Simoi	11-8, 11-2, 11-9

25 July 2014; 12:50	New Zealand	3–0	Papua New Guinea	Scotstoun Sports Campus, Glasgow

report	Individual matches
Peter Jackson	3–0	Frank Hila	11-1, 11-0, 11-4
John Cordue	3–0	Boe Mea	11-3, 11-1, 11-8
Phillip Xiao/John Cordue	3–0	David Loi/Frank Hila	11-1, 14-12, 11-4

25 July 2014; 12:50	Wales	3–0	Kenya	Scotstoun Sports Campus, Glasgow

report	Individual matches
Conor Edwards	3–0	Peter Muturi	11-2, 11-3, 11-5
Daniel O'Connell	3–0	Anthony Mathenge Ringui	11-4, 11-6, 11-6
Stephen Jenkins/Conor Edwards	3–0	Michael Owuor Otieno/Anthony Mathenge Ringui	11-5, 11-5, 11-6

== Classification stage ==
First round
18	Bangladesh	bye
X
15	Jamaica	3
26	Tanzania	0
22	Saint Lucia	2
17	Vanuatu	3
24	Papua New Guinea	0
16	Ghana	3
27	Uganda	3
28	Zambia	0
25	Seychelles	0
12	Trinidad and Tobago	3
21	Kenya	3
22	Kiribati	2
X
20	Guyana	bye

Quarterfinals
18	Bangladesh	0
15	Jamaica	3
17	Vanuatu	0
16	Ghana	3
27	Uganda	0
12	Trinidad and Tobago	3
21	Kenya	0
20	Guyana	3

Semifinals
15	Jamaica	1
16	Ghana	3
12	Trinidad and Tobago	3
20	Guyana	1

Final
16	Ghana	0
12	Trinidad and Tobago	3

=== First round ===
25 July 2014; 16:00	Jamaica	3–0	Tanzania	Scotstoun Sports Campus, Glasgow

report	Individual matches
Simon Tomlinson	3–1	Amoni Amaine Tumaini	11-6, 11-8, 7-11, 11-6
Kane Watson	3–0	Yahya Hassan Mungilwa	11-1, 11-6, 11-8
Dale Parham/Kane Watson	3–0	Masoud Issa Mtalaso/Amoni Amaine Tumaini	11-3, 12-10, 16-14

25 July 2014; 16:00	Saint Lucia	2–3	Vanuatu	Scotstoun Sports Campus, Glasgow

report	Individual matches
Omarie Ferdinand	1–3	Yoshua Shing	11-9, 4-11, 4-11, 8-11
Adrian Albert	3–0	Samuel Saul	11-3, 11-3, 11-8
Chris Wells/Adrian Albert	2–3	Ham Lulu/Yoshua Shing	7-11, 11-9, 14-12, 5-11, 10-12
Chris Wells	3–0	Samuel Saul	11-6, 11-2, 11-2
Omarie Ferdinand	2–3	Ham Lulu	6-11, 7-11, 11-5, 12-10, 3-11

25 July 2014; 18:30	Papua New Guinea	0–3	Ghana	Scotstoun Sports Campus, Glasgow

report	Individual matches
Geoffrey Loi	0–3	Emmanuel Commey	5-11, 3-11, 5-11
David Loi	0–3	Derek Abrefa	3-11, 4-11, 6-11
Frank Hila/Geoffrey Loi	0–3	Samuel Akayade/Emmanuel Commey	2-11, 4-11, 8-11

25 July 2014; 18:30	Uganda	3–0	Zambia	Scotstoun Sports Campus, Glasgow

report	Individual matches
Kevin Evans Mafabi	3–2	Simasiku Kalaluka	11-8, 11-7, 7-11, 9-11, 11-8
Gilton Chelibe	3–0	Friday Ng'andu	11-9, 13-11, 11-9
Paul Moody Mutambuze/Kevin Evans Mafabi	3–2	Noel Kasanda/Friday Ng'andu	8-11, 11-7, 11-6, 9-11, 11-8

25 July 2014; 18:30	Seychelles	0–3	Trinidad and Tobago	Scotstoun Sports Campus, Glasgow

report	Individual matches
Dario Laurence	0–3	Dexter St. Louis	6-11, 5-11, 3-11
Godfrey Sultan	0–3	Curtis Humphreys	6-11, 4-11, 5-11
Nicholas Esther/Godfrey Sultan	1–3	Yuvraaj Dookram/Curtis Humphreys	11-9, 10-12, 3-11, 9-11

25 July 2014; 18:30	Kenya	3–2	Kiribati	Scotstoun Sports Campus, Glasgow

report	Individual matches
Peter Muturi	3–0	Katirakei Tetabo	11-6, 11-7, 11-9
Anthony Mathenge Ringui	1–3	Choy Freddy	6-11, 4-11, 11-3, 10-12
Michael Owuor Otieno/Anthony Mathenge Ringui	3–0	Teitua Beia/Katirakei Tetabo	11-5, 11-5, 11-4
Michael Owuor Otieno	2–3	Choy Freddy	9-11, 12-10, 12-10, 5-11, 8-11
Peter Muturi	3–1	Teitua Beia	11-8, 5-11, 11-8, 11-4

=== Quarterfinals ===
26 July 2014; 12:00	Bangladesh	0–3	Jamaica	Scotstoun Sports Campus, Glasgow

report	Individual matches
Javed Ahmed	0–3	Kane Watson	3-11, 10-12, 8-11
Manash Chowdhury	1–3	Simon Tomlinson	3-11, 11-4, 11-13, 5-11
Mahmub Billah/Manash Chowdhury	1–3	Christopher Marsh/Simon Tomlinson	8-11, 10-12, 11-9, 9-11

26 July 2014; 12:00	Vanuatu	0–3	Ghana	Scotstoun Sports Campus, Glasgow

report	Individual matches
Yoshua Shing	1–3	Emmanuel Commey	11-8, 7-11, 7-11, 9-11
Ham Lulu	0–3	Felix Lartey	6-11, 4-11, 2-11
Alan Lin/Yoshua Shing	1–3	Derek Abrefa/Felix Lartey	11-9, 12-14, 8-11, 4-11

26 July 2014; 12:00	Uganda	0–3	Trinidad and Tobago	Scotstoun Sports Campus, Glasgow

report	Individual matches
Gilton Chelibe	0–3	Curtis Humphreys	6-11, 6-11, 7-11
Kevin Evans Mafabi	0–3	Aaron Wilson	8-11, 9-11, 9-11
Paul Moody Mutambuze/Kevin Evans Mafabi	1–3	Yuvraaj Dookram/Aaron Wilson	8-11, 11-7, 12-14, 9-11

26 July 2014; 12:00	Kenya	0–3	Guyana	Scotstoun Sports Campus, Glasgow

report	Individual matches
Peter Muturi	0–3	Paul David	5-11, 7-11, 5-11
Anthony Mathenge Ringui	0–3	Christopher Franklin	6-11, 8-11, 4-11
Michael Owuor Otieno/Anthony Mathenge Ringui	1–3	Shamar Britton/Christopher Franklin	5-11, 9-11, 11-6, 11-13

=== Semifinals ===
26 July 2014; 18:30	Jamaica	1–3	Ghana	Scotstoun Sports Campus, Glasgow

report	Individual matches
Simon Tomlinson	3–1	Emmanuel Commey	11-2, 13-11, 13-15, 11-8
Kane Watson	1–3	Felix Lartey	6-11, 9-11, 11-9, 9-11
Dale Parham/Kane Watson	0–3	Derek Abrefa/Felix Lartey	8-11, 7-11, 8-11
Dale Parham	2–3	Emmanuel Commey	8-11, 4-11, 11-9, 11-7, 7-11

26 July 2014; 18:30	Trinidad and Tobago	3–1	Guyana	Scotstoun Sports Campus, Glasgow

report	Individual matches
Curtis Humphreys	3–1	Christopher Franklin	11-9, 3-11, 11-8, 11-8
Dexter St. Louis	3–0	Paul David	11-6, 11-7, 11-8
Aaron Wilson/Dexter St. Louis	1–3	Shamal Britton/Christopher Franklin	9-11, 10-12, 11-7, 1-11
Aaron Wilson	3–1	Paul David	11-6, 4-11, 11-6, 11-3

=== Final ===
27 July 2014; 09:30	Ghana	0–3	Trinidad and Tobago	Scotstoun Sports Campus, Glasgow

report	Individual matches
Emmanuel Commey	1–3	Curtis Humphreys	11-9, 7-11, 2-11, 9-11
Felix Lartey	0–3	Dexter St. Louis	5-11, 9-11, 7-11
Derek Abrefa/Felix Lartey	2–3	Aaron Wilson/Curtis Humphreys	10-12, 11-6, 8-11, 11-9, 7-11

== Knockout stage ==
First round
1
16
7	New Zealand	3
19	Barbados	0
6	Australia	3
5	Canada	1
11	Northern Ireland	2
4	Nigeria	3
3	India	3
9	Malaysia	0
13	Sri Lanka	0
8	Scotland	3
10	Wales	3
14	Mauritius	1
2
15

Quarterfinals
1	Singapore	3
7	New Zealand	0
6	Australia	2
4	Nigeria	3
3	India	3
8	Scotland	0
10	Wales	0
2	England	3

Semifinals
1	Singapore	3
4	Nigeria	1
3	India	1
2	England	3

Gold medal match
1	Singapore	3
2	England	1
Bronze medal match
4	Nigeria	3
3	India	1

=== First round ===
25 July 2014; 18:30	New Zealand	3–0	Barbados	Scotstoun Sports Campus, Glasgow

report	Individual matches
Phillip Xiao	3–1	Kevin Farley	11-4, 11-6, 3-11, 11-6
Liu Tengteng	3–0	Trevor Farley	11-2, 11-3, 11-5
Shane Laugesen/Phillip Xiao	3–0	Mark-Anthony Dowell/Trevor Farley	11-5, 11-3, 11-4

25 July 2014; 18:30	Australia	3–1	Canada	Scotstoun Sports Campus, Glasgow

report	Individual matches
William Henzell	3–1	Eugene Wang	11-7, 14-12, 10-12, 13-11
Yan Xin	3–2	Andre Ho	11-7, 11-13, 11-13, 11-8, 11-9
David Powell/Yan Xin	2–3	Pierre-Luc Thériault/Eugene Wang	11-8, 5-11, 11-7, 2-11, 8-11
William Henzell	3–0	Pierre-Luc Thériault	11-9, 12-10, 11-9

25 July 2014; 18:30	Northern Ireland	2–3	Nigeria	Scotstoun Sports Campus, Glasgow

report	Individual matches
Ashley Robinson	3–1	Ojo Onaolapo	14-12, 7-11, 11-6, 12-10
Paul McCreery	1–3	Quadri Aruna	6-11, 2-11, 14-12, 8-11
Paul Graham/Ashley Robinson	0–3	Segun Toriola/Ojo Onaolapo	9-11, 8-11, 8-11
Paul McCreery	3–2	Segun Toriola	13-11, 13-11, 8-11, 5-11, 13-11
Paul Graham	0–3	Quadri Aruna	9-11, 5-11, 1-11

25 July 2014; 18:30	India	3–0	Malaysia	Scotstoun Sports Campus, Glasgow

report	Individual matches
Sharath Kamal	3–0	Muhamad Ashraf Haiqal Muhamad Rizal	11-8, 11-5, 11-8
Anthony Amalraj	3–1	Muhd Shakirin Ibrahim	7-11, 11-7, 11-7, 11-5
Harmeet Desai/Anthony Amalraj	3–0	Dunley Foo/Muhamad Ashraf Haiqal Muhamad Rizal	11-9, 11-9, 11-2

25 July 2014; 18:30	Sri Lanka	0–3	Scotland	Scotstoun Sports Campus, Glasgow

report	Individual matches
Rohan Sirisena	0–3	Gavin Rumgay	12-14, 7-11, 10-12
Dinesh Deshappriya	0–3	Craig Howieson	9-11, 3-11, 5-11
Udaya Ranasingha/Rohan Sirisena	1–3	Sean Doherty/Craig Howieson	17-19, 13-11, 8-11, 5-11

25 July 2014; 18:30	Wales	3–1	Mauritius	Scotstoun Sports Campus, Glasgow

report	Individual matches
Stephen Jenkins	2–3	Akhilen Yogarajah	8-11, 11-9, 3-11, 11-5, 15-17
Ryan Jenkins	3–0	Brian Chan Yook Fo	11-5, 11-4, 11-8
Daniel O'Connell/Stephen Jenkins	3–0	Billy Chan Yook Fo/Akhilen Yogarajah	11-7, 11-3, 11-9
Ryan Jenkins'	3–0	Billy Chan Yook Fo	11-5, 11-3, 11-3

=== Quarterfinals ===
26 July 2014; 12:00	Singapore	3–0	New Zealand	Scotstoun Sports Campus, Glasgow

report	Individual matches
Zhan Jian	3–0	Liu Tengteng	11-9, 11-9, 11-8
Li Hu	3–0	Phillip Xiao	11-5, 11-2, 11-4
Gao Ning/Li Hu	3–1	Shane Laugesen/Liu Tengteng	11-6, 11-5, 8-11, 11-5

26 July 2014; 12:00	Australia	2–3	Nigeria	Scotstoun Sports Campus, Glasgow

report	Individual matches
William Henzell	3–2	Bode Abiodun	8-11, 10-12, 11-4, 11-5, 11-5
Yan Xin	1–3	Quadri Aruna	8-11, 8-11, 11-9, 10-12
David Powell/Yan Xin	1–3	Quadri Aruna/Bode Abiodun	8-11, 8-11, 11-9, 10-12
William Henzell	3–1	Segun Toriola	8-11, 12-10, 12-10, 11-7
David Powell	0–3	Quadri Aruna	7-11, 4-11, 4-11

26 July 2014; 18:30	India	3–0	Scotland	Scotstoun Sports Campus, Glasgow

report	Individual matches
Soumyajit Ghosh	3–0	Gavin Rumgay	11-6, 11-5, 11-6
Sharath Kamal	3–0	Craig Howieson	11-7, 11-7, 11-8
Harmeet Desai/Soumyajit Ghosh	3–0	Sean Doherty/Craig Howieson	11-7, 11-8, 11-6

26 July 2014; 18:30	Wales	0–3	England	Scotstoun Sports Campus, Glasgow

report	Individual matches
Ryan Jenkins	1–3	Paul Drinkhall	13-11, 9-11, 9-11, 5-11
Stephen Jenkins	0–3	Liam Pitchford	7-11, 1-11, 4-11
Daniel O'Connell/Stephen Jenkins	0–3	Andrew Baggaley/Paul Drinkhall	7-11, 10-12, 8-11

=== Semifinals ===
27 July 2014; 16:30	Singapore	3–1	Nigeria	Scotstoun Sports Campus, Glasgow

report	Individual matches
Gao Ning	3–2	Segun Toriola	11-7, 11-8, 9-11, 7-11, 11-9
Zhan Jian	1–3	Quadri Aruna	7-11, 12-10, 12-14, 9-11
Li Hu/Gao Ning	3–1	Bode Abiodun/Segun Toriola	11-4, 11-2, 8-11, 11-7
Zhan Jian	3–1	Bode Abiodun	2-11, 11-4, 11-7, 11-8

26 July 2014; 19:00	India	1–3	England	Scotstoun Sports Campus, Glasgow

report	Individual matches
Sharath Kamal	2–3	Liam Pitchford	4-11, 11-8, 11-9, 5-11, 6-11
Anthony Amalraj	0–3	Paul Drinkhall	5-11, 8-11, 9-11
Harmeet Desai/Anthony Amalraj	3–2	Andrew Baggaley/Paul Drinkhall	7-11, 16-14, 11-8, 7-11, 13-11
Harmeet Desai	2–3	Liam Pitchford	5-11, 6-11, 12-10, 12-10, 15-17

=== Bronze medal ===
28 July 2014; 11:00	Nigeria	3–1	India	Scotstoun Sports Campus, Glasgow

report	Individual matches
Segun Toriola	0–3	Sharath Kamal	9-11, 5-11, 7-11
Quadri Aruna	3–1	Harmeet Desai	11-7, 11-8, 9-11, 11-5
Ojo Onaolapo/Segun Toriola	3–2	Anthony Amalraj/Harmeet Desai	3-11, 11-9, 11-5, 9-11, 11-9
Ojo Onaolapo	3–1	Sharath Kamal	11-9, 3-11, 11-7, 11-5

=== Final ===
28 July 2014; 13:30	Singapore	3–1	England	Scotstoun Sports Campus, Glasgow

report	Individual matches
Zhan Jian	3–2	Paul Drinkhall	5-11, 11-5, 6-11, 11-7, 11-2
Gao Ning	3–0	Liam Pitchford	11-9, 13-11, 11-3
Li Hu/Gao Ning	1–3	Andrew Baggaley/Paul Drinkhall	11-8, 6-11, 8-11, 3-11
Zhan Jian	3–0	Andrew Baggaley	11-4, 11-8, 11-9
