= Table tennis at the 2014 Commonwealth Games =

- Venue: Scotstoun Sports Campus
- Location: Glasgow, Scotland
- Dates: 24 July to 2 August

Table tennis at the 2014 Commonwealth Games was the fourth appearance of Table tennis at the Commonwealth Games. The table tennis competition at the 2014 Commonwealth Games was held in Glasgow, Scotland and took place between 24 July and 2 August at the Scotstoun Sports Campus.

== Medal table ==
Rank	Nation	Gold	Silver	Bronze	Total
1	Singapore	6	2	2	10
2	England	1	2	2	5
3	Australia	0	1	1	2
4	India	0	1	0	1
4	Malaysia	0	1	0	1
6	Canada	0	0	1	1
6	Nigeria	0	0	1	1
Totals (7 entries)		7	7	7	21

== Medallists ==
Event	Gold	Silver	Bronze
Men's singles	Zhan Jian; Singapore	Gao Ning; Singapore	Liam Pitchford; England
Women's singles	Feng Tianwei; Singapore	Yu Mengyu; Singapore	Lin Ye; Singapore
Men's doubles	Gao Ning and Li Hu; Singapore	Sharath Kamal and Amalraj Anthony Arputharaj; India	Yang Zi and Zhan Jian; Singapore
Women's doubles	Feng Tianwei and Yu Mengyu; Singapore	Miao Miao and Jian Fang Lay; Australia	Anqi Luo and Zhang Mo; Canada
Mixed doubles	Paul Drinkhall and Joanna Drinkhall; England	Liam Pitchford and Tin-Tin Ho; England	Daniel Reed and Kelly Sibley; England
Men's team	Singapore Clarence Chew; Gao Ning; Li Hu; Yang Zi; Zhan Jian	England Andrew Baggaley; Paul Drinkhall; Liam Pitchford; Daniel Reed; Sam Walker	Nigeria Bode Abiodun; Quadri Aruna; Jide Ogidiolu; Ojo Onaolapo; Segun Toriola
Women's team	Singapore Feng Tianwei; LI Siyun Isabelle; Lin Ye; Yu Mengyu; Zhou Yihan	Malaysia Beh Lee Wei; Ho Ying; Lee Rou You; Ng Sock Khim	Australia Miao Miao; Zhenhua Dederko; Jian Fang Lay; Melissa Tapper; Ziyu Zhang

== Participating nations ==
- Australia (10)
- Bangladesh (3)
- Barbados (6)
- Belize (1)
- Botswana (3)
- Canada (8)
- Cyprus (1)
- Dominica (3)
- England (10)
- Ghana (10)
- Guernsey (2)
- Guyana (8)
- India (10)
- Jamaica (8)
- Jersey (3)
- Kenya (6)
- Kiribati (3)
- Lesotho (2)
- Malawi (2)
- Malaysia (8)
- Maldives (6)
- Mauritius (6)
- New Zealand (10)
- Nigeria (10)
- Northern Ireland (7)
- Pakistan (4)
- Papua New Guinea (10)
- Saint Kitts and Nevis (3)
- Saint Lucia (4)
- Scotland (7)
- Seychelles (5)
- Sierra Leone (2)
- Singapore (10)
- Solomon Islands (1)
- Sri Lanka (8)
- Saint Vincent and the Grenadines (5)
- Tanzania (6)
- Trinidad and Tobago (8)
- Tuvalu (2)
- Uganda (5)
- Vanuatu (8)
- Wales (9)
- Zambia (3)
