= Badminton at the 2014 Commonwealth Games =

- Dates: 24 July – 3 August 2014
- Host city: Glasgow, Scotland
- Venue: Emirates Arena, Glasgow
- Events: 6
- Participation: – athletes from – nations

Badminton at the 2014 Commonwealth Games was the 13th appearance of Badminton at the Commonwealth Games. The badminton events took place between Thursday 24 July and Sunday 3 August at the newly built Emirates Arena, in Glasgow.

Badminton is one of ten core sports at the Commonwealth Games and has been continuously held at the Games since its first appearance at the 1966 British Empire and Commonwealth Games in Kingston, Jamaica. The badminton programme in 2014 included men's and women's singles competitions; men's, women's and mixed doubles competitions alongside a mixed team event throughout the 11 days of competition. The draw for the tournament was held on 21 July in Glasgow.

== Schedule ==
All times are British Summer Time (UTC+1)

| P | Preliminaries | ¼ | Quarterfinals | ½ | Semifinals | B | Bronze medal match | F | Final |

| Date → | Thu 24 | | | Fri 25 | | | Sat 26 | | Sun 27 | | Mon 28 | | Tue 29 | | Wed 30 | | Thu 31 | | Fri 1 | | Sat 2 | | Sun 3 |
| Event ↓ | M | A | E | M | A | E | M | E | M | E | M | A | M | A | M | A | A | E | A | E | M | E | M |
|---|---|---|---|---|---|---|---|---|---|---|---|---|---|---|---|---|---|---|---|---|---|---|---|
| Men's singles | | | | | | | | | | | | | P | | | | | | ¼ | | ½ | B | F |
| Men's doubles | | | | | | | | | | | | | P | | | | | | ¼ | | ½ | B | F |
| Women's singles | | | | | | | | | | | | | P | | | | | | ¼ | | ½ | B | F |
| Women's doubles | | | | | | | | | | | | | P | | | | | | ¼ | | ½ | B | F |
| Mixed doubles | | | | | | | | | | | | | P | | | | | | ¼ | | ½ | B | F |
| Mixed team | P | | | | | | | ¼ | ½ | | B | F | | | | | | | | | | | |

M = Morning session, A = Afternoon session, E = Evening session

== Medal table ==
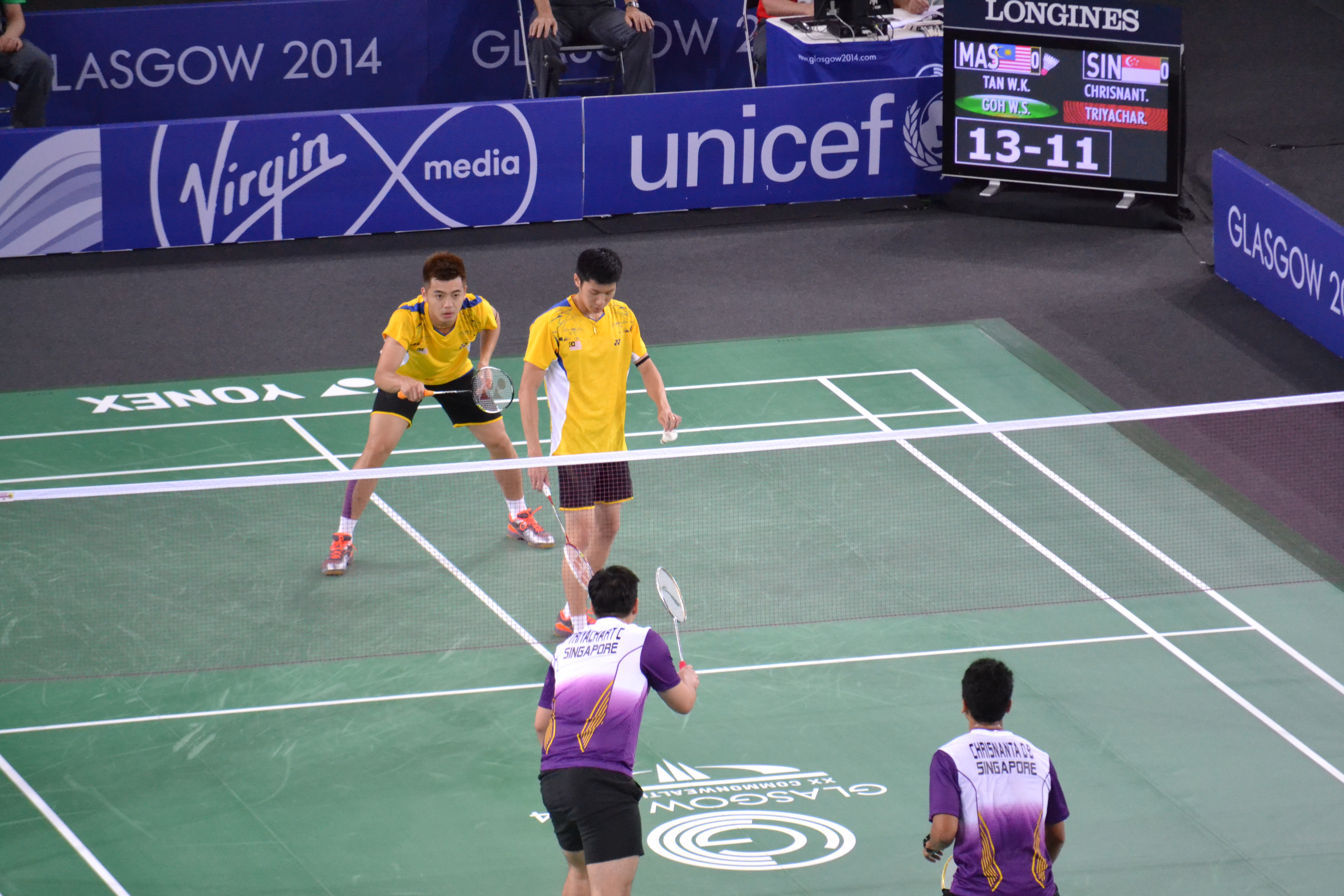
Final MAS vs SIN

* Host nation (Scotland)

| Rank | Nation | Gold | Silver | Bronze | Total |
|---|---|---|---|---|---|
| 1 | Malaysia | 3 | 0 | 0 | 3 |
| 2 | England | 1 | 2 | 2 | 5 |
| 3 | India | 1 | 1 | 2 | 4 |
| 4 | Canada | 1 | 0 | 0 | 1 |
| 5 | Singapore | 0 | 2 | 1 | 3 |
| 6 | Scotland* | 0 | 1 | 1 | 2 |
| Totals (6 entries) | | 6 | 6 | 6 | 18 |

== Medal summary ==
| Event | Gold | Silver | Bronze |
|---|---|---|---|
| Men's singles | Kashyap Parupalli; India | Derek Wong; Singapore | Gurusai Dutt; India |
| Women's singles | Michelle Li; Canada | Kirsty Gilmour; Scotland | P. V. Sindhu; India |
| Men's doubles | Tan Wee Kiong and Goh V Shem; Malaysia | Danny Bawa Chrisnanta and Chayut Triyachart; Singapore | Chris Langridge and Peter Mills; England |
| Women's doubles | Vivian Hoo and Woon Khe Wei; Malaysia | Jwala Gutta and Ashwini Ponnappa; India | Gabby Adcock and Lauren Smith; England |
| Mixed doubles | Chris Adcock and Gabby Adcock; England | Chris Langridge and Heather Olver; England | Robert Blair and Imogen Bankier; Scotland |
| Mixed team | Malaysia; Chong Wei Feng; Liew Daren; Tee Jing Yi; Woon Khe Wei; Lai Pei Jing; Lim Yin Loo; Chan Peng Soon; Vivian Hoo; Tan Wee Kiong; Goh V Shem | England; Andrew Ellis; Chris Adcock; Chris Langridge; Gabby Adcock; Heather Olver; Kate Robertshaw; Lauren Smith; Peter Mills; Rajiv Ouseph; Sarah Walker | Singapore; Huang Chao; Chayut Triyachart; Danny Bawa Chrisnanta; Derek Wong; Yao Lei; Fu Mingtian; Shinta Mulia Sari; Terry Hee; Vanessa Neo; Liang Xiaoyu |
