= Shooting at the 2014 Commonwealth Games – Men's 10 metre air rifle =

Shooting – Men's 10 metre air rifle at the 2014 Commonwealth Games
- Venue: Barry Buddon Shooting Centre
- Dates: 25 July 2014
- Competitors: 21 from 14 nations

Medalists
gold medal	Abhinav Bindra	India
silver medal	Abdullah Baki	Bangladesh
bronze medal	Dan Rivers	England

The Men's 10 metre air rifle event took place on 25 July 2014 at the Barry Buddon Shooting Centre. There was a qualification to determine the participants in the finals.

== Results ==
=== Qualification ===
Rank	Name	1	2	3	4	5	6	Points	Notes
1	Dan Rivers (ENG)	104.2	103.5	102	104.6	105.9	103.4	623.6	Q
2	Kenneth Parr (ENG)	103.9	103.8	104.5	104.7	104.9	101.6	623.4	Q
3	Abhinav Bindra (IND)	102.1	103.2	105.4	104.3	104.1	103.1	622.2	Q
4	Ravi Kumar (IND)	102.3	104.3	103.9	103.8	103.6	102.7	620.6	Q
5	Abdullah Baki (BAN)	103.4	104.8	103.3	104	102.5	102	620.0	Q
6	Mike Bamsey (WAL)	102.7	102.5	102.4	104.1	103.9	102.1	617.7	Q
7	Dane Sampson (AUS)	102.1	100.9	104.3	101.1	102.6	102.9	613.9	Q
8	Muhammad Nasir Khan (MAS)	102.4	102.2	101.5	103	102.4	101.9	613.4	Q
9	Zeeshan Farid (PAK)	100.7	102.8	104	100.9	103.7	101.1	613.2	
10	Jack Rossiter (AUS)	100.8	101.1	100.6	103	103.9	102.5	611.9	
11	Keith Chan (SIN)	100.6	103.5	99.9	101.4	102.2	102.8	610.4	
12	Sean Tay (SIN)	99.9	101.8	100.8	103.1	103.5	100.6	609.7	
13	Mohd Hadafi Jaafar (MAS)	98.8	100.2	101.5	102	101.1	103.7	607.3	
14	David Turner (JER)	101.4	100.1	101.7	102.6	100.8	100.3	606.9	
15	Md Munna (BAN)	100	100	101.3	102.1	102.8	99.1	605.3	
16	Simon Henry (SHN)	97.4	98.4	101.7	98.1	100.3	100.9	596.8	
17	Chandana Siriwardana (SRI)	101.4	98.6	98.7	99.4	98.6	98.8	595.5	
18	Mangala Samarakoon (SRI)	99.3	98.9	93.4	99.5	98.3	100.3	589.7	
19	Marlon Best (BAR)	93.9	91.3	93.7	95	95.4	93	562.3	
−	Sesan Abolarin (NGR)	−	−	−	−	−	−	−	DNS
−	Okposo Esugo (NGR)	−	−	−	−	−	−	−	DNS

=== Finals ===
Rank	Name	1	2	3	4	5	6	7	8	9	Points	Notes
1st place, gold medalist(s)	Abhinav Bindra (IND)	30	31.2	20.9	20.2	21.1	20.6	20.4	20.5	20.4	205.3	FGR
2nd place, silver medalist(s)	Abdullah Baki (BAN)	29.4	30.4	20.7	20.2	21.2	20.4	20.6	19.5	19.7	202.1	
3rd place, bronze medalist(s)	Dan Rivers (ENG)	30..	31.1	20.4	20.1	20.2	20.7	19.9	20	-	182.4	
4	Ravi Kumar (IND)	31.1	30.5	21.	21.	20.5	19.	19.3	-	-	162.4	
5	Kenneth Parr (ENG)	30.8	29.9	19.9	20.4	19.9	19.4	-	-	-	140.3	
6	Muhammad Nasir Khan (MAS)	28.5	30.6	20.7	19.8	20.1	-	-	-	-	119.7	
7	Mike Bamsey (WAL)	30.7	28.8	19.5	19.2	-	-	-	-	-	98.2	
8	Dane Sampson (AUS)	29.9	29.6	19.2	-	-	-	-	-	-	77.8	
