= Gymnastics at the 2014 Commonwealth Games – Men's vault =

Men's vault at the 2014 Commonwealth Games
- Venue: SSE Hydro
- Dates: 1 August 2014
- Competitors: 8 from 6 nations
- Winning score: 14.733

Medalists
gold medal	Scott Morgan	Canada
silver medal	Kristian Thomas	England
bronze medal	Wah Toon Hoe	Singapore

The men's individual vault competition of the 2014 Commonwealth Games took place on August 1 at the SSE Hydro arena in Glasgow, Scotland.

== Results ==
=== Qualification ===
Qualification took place on July 29 as part of the team and individual qualification event.

=== Final ===
Position	Gymnast	Vault 1	Vault 2	Total
1st place, gold medalist(s)	Scott Morgan (CAN)	14.766	14.700	14.733
2nd place, silver medalist(s)	Kristian Thomas (ENG)	14.366	14.633	14.499
3rd place, bronze medalist(s)	Wah Toon Hoe (SIN)	14.258	14.133	14.195
4	Kent Pieterse (AUS)	14.233	13.966	14.099
5	Frank Baines (SCO)	13.633	14.400	14.016
6	Aizat Bin Muhammad Jufrie (SIN)	14.000	14.033	14.016
7	Adam Cox (SCO)	13.516	13.033	13.274
8	Ashish Kumar (IND)	14.333	0.000	7.166
