= Zhan Jian =

Chinese-born Singaporean table tennis player

Personal information
- Native name: 詹健
- Nationality: Singapore
- Born: 30 January 1982 (age 44) Huangshi, Hubei, China
- Height: 1.70 m (5 ft 7 in)
- Weight: 70 kg (150 lb; 11 st)

Sport
- Sport: Table tennis
- Playing style: Right-handed Shakehand grip
Medal record
Men's Table Tennis
Representing Singapore
Commonwealth Games
Gold medal – first place	2014 Glasgow	Singles
Gold medal – first place	2014 Glasgow	Team
Bronze medal – third place	2014 Glasgow	Doubles
Southeast Asian Games
Gold medal – first place	2013 Naypyidaw	Singles
Gold medal – first place	2013 Naypyidaw	Team

Zhan Jian (born 30 January 1982 in Huangshi, Hubei) is a Chinese-born Singaporean table tennis player. He competed for Singapore in the men's team event at the 2012 Summer Olympics. At the 2014 Commonwealth Games, he won the men's individual table tennis, beating teammate Gao Ning 4 - 0 in the final. He was also part of the Singaporean men's team that won gold. In the men's doubles, he and teammate Yang Zi missed out on the final and could only win bronze.

In 2015, Zhang retired from table tennis after a recurring elbow injury.
