= Bangladesh at the 2014 Commonwealth Games =

- CG code: BAN
- CGA: Bangladesh Olympic Association
- Website: nocban.com

in Glasgow, Scotland
- Competitors: 30 in 10 sports
- Flag bearers: Opening:Iqbal Islam; Closing:
- Medals Ranked =29th: Gold 0 Silver 1 Bronze 0 Total 1

Commonwealth Games appearances (overview)
- 1978; 1982–1986; 1990; 1994; 1998; 2002; 2006; 2010; 2014; 2018; 2022; 2026; 2030

Bangladesh participated at the 2014 Commonwealth Games in Glasgow, Scotland. The Bangladesh Olympic Association announced that its delegation for the games would consist of 30 athletes in 10 sports. The total of 30 athletes consisted of eight athletes in shooting, four in weightlifting, three each in cycling, table tennis, and boxing; two each in athletics, badminton, swimming, and wrestling; and one in gymnastics.

== Medalists ==
Medal	Name	Sport	Event	Date
Silver	Abdullah Baki	Shooting	Men's Shooting (10 metre air rifle)	25 July

== Athletics ==
Men

Athlete	Event	Round 1		Semifinal		Final	
Athlete	Event	Result	Rank	Result	Rank	Result	Rank
Mesbah Ahmed	100 m	11.13 PB	63	did not advance			
Mesbah Ahmed	200 m	DSQ		did not advance			

Women

Athlete	Event	Round 1		Semifinal		Final	
Athlete	Event	Result	Rank	Result	Rank	Result	Rank
Shirin Akter	100 m	12.87	45	did not advance			
Shirin Akter	200 m	26.41	39	did not advance			

== Badminton ==
Men

Athlete	Event	Round of 64	Round of 32	Round of 16	Quarterfinals	Semifinals	Final
Athlete	Event	Opposition Result	Opposition Result	Opposition Result	Opposition Result	Opposition Result	Opposition Result
Ayman Ibn Jaman	Singles	W Tukire (UGA); W 2 - 0	C Huang (SIN); L 0 - 2	did not advance			
Anamul Haque	Singles	T Stephenson (NIR); L 0 - 2	did not advance				
Ayman Ibn Jaman; Anamul Haque	Doubles	Bye	G Warfe/R Tam (AUS); L 0 -2	did not advance			

== Boxing ==
Men

Athlete	Event	Round of 32	Round of 16	Quarterfinals	Semifinals	Final
Athlete	Event	Opposition Result	Opposition Result	Opposition Result	Opposition Result	Opposition Result
Al Amin	Light welterweight	Hindley (NZL); L 0 - 2	did not advance			
Sura Krishan Chakma	Lightweight	Milnes (NZL); L 0 - 3	did not advance			
Arif Hossain	Welterweight	Davis (JAM); L 0 - 3	did not advance			

== Cycling ==
=== Track ===
Sprint

Athlete	Event	Qualification		Round 1	Repechage 1	Quarterfinals	Semifinals	Final	
Athlete	Event	Time Speed (km/h)	Rank	Opposition Time Speed (km/h)	Opposition Time Speed (km/h)	Opposition Time Speed (km/h)	Opposition Time Speed (km/h)	Opposition Time Speed (km/h)	Rank
Tarikul Islam	Men's sprint	14.199 (50.707)	28	did not advance					
Iftekhar Refat	Men's sprint	14.156 (50.861)	27	did not advance					

Time trial

Athlete	Event	Time	Rank
Alomgir Alomgir	Men's time trial	DNS	

Team sprint

Athlete	Event	Qualification		Final	
Athlete	Event	Time Speed (km/h)	Rank	Opposition Time Speed (km/h)	Rank
Alomgir Alomgir; Tarikul Islam; Iftekhar Refat	Men's team sprint	58.350 (46.272)	9	did not advance	

== Gymnastics ==
=== Artistic ===
Men

Athlete	Event	Qualification							
Athlete	Event	Apparatus						Total	Rank
Athlete	Event	F	PH	R	V	PB	HB	Total	Rank
Syque Caesar	Individual	13.233	10.166	10.600	13.333	14.133	9.933	71.398	27

== Shooting ==
=== Clay target ===
Men

Athlete	Event	Qualification		Semifinals	Final	
Athlete	Event	Result	Rank	Opposition Result	Opposition Result	Rank
Iqbal Islam	Skeet	99	22	did not advance		
Noor Salim	Skeet	107	18	did not advance		

=== Pistol ===
Women

Athlete	Event	Qualification		Final	
Athlete	Event	Result	Rank	Result	Rank
Armin Asha	10 m air pistol	376	6 Q	75.9	8
Ardina Ferdous	10 m air pistol	375	10	did not advance	

=== Small bore ===
Men

Athlete	Event	Qualification		Final	
Athlete	Event	Result	Rank	Result	Rank
Abdullah Baki	10 m air rifle	620.0	5 Q	202.1	2nd place, silver medalist(s)
Md Munna	10 m air rifle	605.3	15	did not advance	

Women

Athlete	Event	Qualification		Final	
Athlete	Event	Result	Rank	Result	Rank
Sharmin Ratna	10 m air rifle	413.8	3 Q	122.0	6
Syeda Sultana	10 m air rifle	410.8	10	did not advance	

== Swimming ==
Men

Athlete	Event	Round 1		Semifinal		Final	
Athlete	Event	Result	Rank	Result	Rank	Result	Rank
Mahfizur Rahman Sagor	50 m freestyle	24.63	36	did not advance			
Mahfizur Rahman Sagor	100 m freestyle	52.97	28	did not advance			

Women

Athlete	Event	Round 1		Semifinal		Final	
Athlete	Event	Result	Rank	Result	Rank	Result	Rank
Mahfuza Khatun	50 m breaststroke	35.88	26	did not advance			
Mahfuza Khatun	100 m breaststroke	1:22.62	35	did not advance			

== Table tennis ==
Men

Athlete	Event	Group Stage				Round of 64	Round of 32	Round of 16	Quarterfinals	Semifinals	Final	
Athlete	Event	Opposition Result	Opposition Result	Opposition Result	Rank	Opposition Result	Opposition Result	Opposition Result	Opposition Result	Opposition Result	Opposition Result	Rank
Md. Javad Ahmed	Singles	Commey (GHA); L 0 - 4	Fo (MRI); W 4 - 3	—N/a	2	did not advance						
Khandoker Al Billah	Singles	Kalaluka (ZAM); W 4 - 3	Yiangou (CYP); L 0 - 4	—N/a	2	did not advance						
Manash Chowdhury	Singles	Mutambuze (UGA); W 4 - 1	Resture (TUV); W 4 - 0	—N/a	1 Q	Ibrahim (MAS); L 0 - 4	did not advance					
Khandoker Al Billah; Manash Chowdhury	Doubles	—N/a				Guyana; L 0 - 3	did not advance					
Md. Javad Ahmed; Khandoker Al Billah; Manash Chowdhury	Team	Nigeria; L 0–3	Kiribati; W 3–1	Mauritius; L 2–3	3 qB	—N/a		Bye	Jamaica; L 0–3	did not advance		

Qualification Legend: Q=Main Bracket (medal); qB=Consolation Bracket (non-medal)

== Weightlifting ==
Men

Athlete	Event	Snatch		Clean & Jerk		Total	Rank
Athlete	Event	Result	Rank	Result	Rank	Total	Rank
Md Islam	-69 kg	110	13	145	11	255	12
Manoranjan Roy	-77 kg	120	12	145	14	265	13

Women

Athlete	Event	Snatch		Clean & Jerk		Total	Rank
Athlete	Event	Result	Rank	Result	Rank	Total	Rank
Molla Shabira	-48 kg	67	5	75	6	142	6
Fayema Akhter	-58 kg	75	11	90	11	165	11

== Wrestling ==
Men's freestyle

Athlete	Event	Round of 32	Round of 16	Quarterfinals	Semifinals	Repechage	Bronze Medal	Final	
Athlete	Event	Opposition Result	Opposition Result	Opposition Result	Opposition Result	Opposition Result	Opposition Result	Opposition Result	Rank
Dipu Ray	-74 kg	Bye	T Hawthorn (WAL); L 0–4	did not advance					
Billal Hosen	-97 kg	—N/a	Bye	S Belkin (NZL); L 0–5	did not advance				
