= Bode Abiodun =

Nigerian table tennis player (born 1980)

Personal information
- Born: 10 September 1980 (age 45)

Sport
- Country: Nigeria
- Sport: Table tennis
Medal record
Men's table tennis
Representing Nigeria
Commonwealth Games
Silver medal – second place	2018 Gold Coast	Team
Bronze medal – third place	2014 Glasgow	Team

Bode Abiodun (born 10 September 1980) is a Nigerian table tennis player. He competed at the 2016 Summer Olympics as part of the Nigerian team, in the men's team event.
