= Daniel Reed (table tennis) =

English table tennis player

Personal information
- Nationality: British
- Born: 5 December 1989 (age 36) Northallerton, England
- Height: 1.79 m (5 ft 10 1/2 in)
- Weight: 70 kg (150 lb; 11 st)

Sport
- Sport: Table tennis
Medal record
Men's table tennis
Representing England
Commonwealth Games
Silver medal – second place	2010 Delhi	Men's team
Silver medal – second place	2014 Glasgow	Men's team
Bronze medal – third place	2014 Glasgow	Mixed doubles

Daniel Reed (born 5 December 1989) is a British table tennis player. He competed for England in the men's team and the mixed doubles events at the 2014 Commonwealth Games where he won a silver and bronze medal respectively.

== See also ==
- List of England players at the World Team Table Tennis Championships
