= Pierre-Luc Thériault =

Canadian table tennis player (born 1993)

Personal information
- Nickname: Bobby
- Nationality: Canada
- Born: October 25, 1993 (age 32) St-Fabien, Quebec, Canada
- Height: 1.75 m (5 ft 9 in)
- Weight: 75 kg (165 lb; 11.8 st)

Sport
- Sport: Table tennis
- Playing style: Left-handed
Medal record
Men's table tennis
Representing Canada
Pan American Games
Bronze medal – third place	2015 Toronto	Men's Team

Pierre-Luc Thériault (born October 25, 1993, in St-Fabien, Quebec) is a Canadian table tennis player. Pierre-Luc Thériault wanted to represent Canada since watching the Sydney 2000 Olympic Games and seeing other athletes proudly perform for their countries. Thériault began playing for the Canadian Cadet National Team as a 13-year-old, progressing to the Canadian Junior National Team before joining the Canadian Senior National Team in 2010. That year he also debuted at the ITTF World Championships.

He has been on the Canadian World Championship Team ever since. Thériault's first exposure to multi-sport competition came as an alternate for the 2010 Commonwealth Games. He was then part of Team Canada at the 2011 Pan Am Games and the 2014 Commonwealth Games. Thériault also competed at the 2015 Pan American Games in Toronto, winning bronze in the men's team event. Among Thériault's career highlights are winning the singles titles at the North American Championships and North American Cup in 2012.

== Best results ==
- 2011 Pan American Games: 9th (singles), 5th (team)
- 2012 North American Champion and 2012 North American Cup Winner
- 2014 Commonwealth Games: 17th (singles), 5th (doubles), 9th (team), 33rd (mixed doubles)
- 2015 Pan American Games: 5th (singles), Bronze Medal (team)
- Canadian National Tournaments :
  - 2009 Canadian U21 SinglesChampion
  - 2013 Quebec Senior Singles Champion
  - 2014 Canada Series Final Winner
  - 2015 Canada Series Final Winner
  - 2015 Canadian Senior Singles Champion
