= Soumyajit Ghosh =

Indian table tennis player

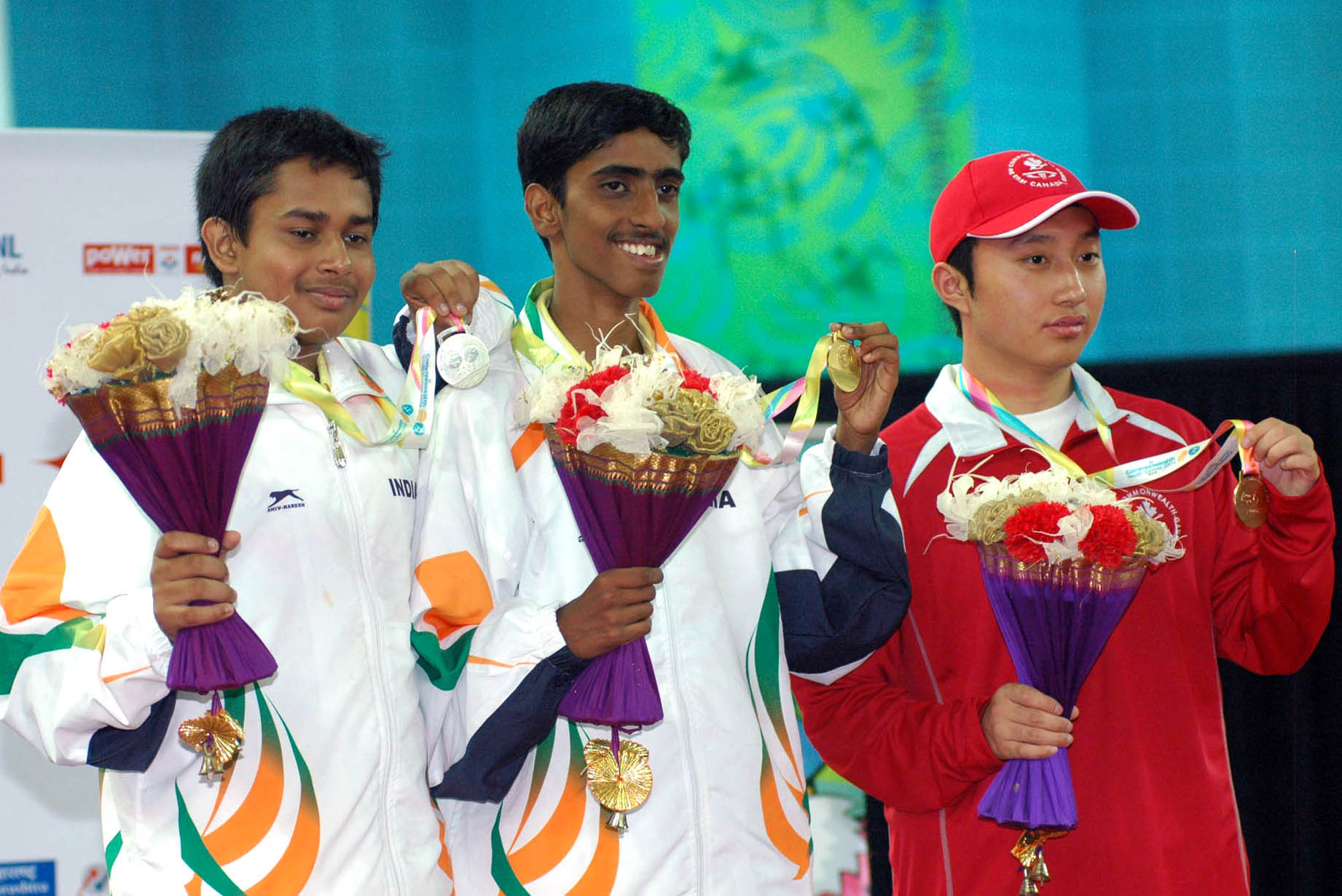
- Ghosh (left) at the 2008 Commonwealth Youth Games

Personal information
- Nickname: Baban
- Nationality: Indian
- Born: 10 May 1993 (age 33) Siliguri, India

Sport
- Sport: Table tennis
- Playing style: Right-handed
Medal record
Men's Table tennis
Representing India
South Asian Games
| Gold medal – first place | 2019 Kathmandu/Pokhara | Men's team |

Soumyajit Ghosh (Bengali: সৌম্যজিৎ ঘোষ; born 10 May 1993) is an Indian table tennis player from Siliguri, West Bengal. He was the youngest Indian player to qualify for the 2012 Summer Olympics. He also became the youngest national champion at the age of 19, when he defeated Sharath Kamal in the 74th National Table Tennis Championships.

== Personal ==
Ghosh hails from a middle-class family in Siliguri. His father Hari Sankar Ghosh works for the local municipal corporation. His mother Mina Ghosh is a homemaker. Soumyajit is an only child. In India he trains at the NIS base in Patiala under coach Bhawani Mukherjee. When abroad, he trains under coach Peter Karlsson in Falkenberg, Sweden. Ghosh is the Indian number 1 in table tennis as per the world ranking (Nov 2016). He was world number 63, as of November 2016.

== Career ==
=== Early career ===
In 2010, Ghosh won mixed doubles bronze medal at the World Junior Championships in Bahrain. He was instrumental in helping the India national team clinch a bronze medal in the World Junior Championships in 2011, by winning both his singles matches against South Korea in the quarter-finals. He was also an integral part of the team that won the Asian Junior Championships in 2011.

=== 2013 ===
In 2013, Ghosh created history by becoming the youngest national champion ever by beating six-time champion Sharath Kamal in the finals of the 74th National Table Tennis Championships. He followed that up by winning the singles event at the Inter Institutional Table Tennis Championships in Dharwad, Karnataka. He also won the singles event in the U-21 category at the Brazil Open in Santos.

=== 2014 ===
At the Lusofonia Games, 2014 in Goa, Ghosh won gold medal in mixed doubles and men's team event as well as a silver and bronze in men's singles and doubles respectively. He was also a quarter finalist at the Senior National Ranking Table Tennis Championships in Patna, 2014. At the 2014 Commonwealth Games, Glasgow Ghosh reached the quarter finals of both men's singles and doubles. He also reached the semis of the team event.

=== 2015 ===
At the WTTC 2015, Soumyajit reached R64 by beating Quadri Aruna.

=== 2016 ===
On 14 April 2016, Soumyajit Ghosh qualified for the 2016 Rio Olympics. However, he made a first round exit in the men's individual event losing to Padasak Tanviriyavechakul of Thailand.

=== 2017 ===
On 30 April 2017, Soumyajit Ghosh won the ITTF Challenge Seamaster Chile Open singles event, by beating compatriot Anthony Amalraj in the final. This was his first ITTF Pro title and he became the third Indian to win an ITTF event.

== Controversy ==
He was placed under provisional suspension and dropped from the Indian Team and replaced by Sanil Shetty for the 2018 Commonwealth Games after a complaint of rape was filed against him by an 18-year-old teenager in Barasat, West Bengal. He has denied the allegations. He later married the girl who accused him of rape.
