= Curtis J. Humphreys =

American physicist

- Born: February 17, 1898; Alliance, Ohio, United States
- Died: 22 November 1986 (aged 88); Delaware, Ohio
- Education: University of Michigan Ph.D. Class of '28
- Known for: Humphreys series of the hydrogen atom
- Awards: Naval Award for Achievement in Science, William F. Meggers Award
- Scientific career
- Fields: Physicist
- Workplaces: U.S. Navy
- Doctoral advisor: William F. Meggers

Curtis Judson Humphreys (17 February 1898 – 22 November 1986) was an American physicist born in Alliance, Ohio, USA and educated at the University of Michigan. He was chief of the Radiometry Section of the U.S. Navy during the 1940s. He is famous for discovering the Humphreys series of the hydrogen atom.

== Biography ==
Humphreys married Jeanetta Mae Raum, with whom he had a son Richard and three daughters, Jean, Katherine, and Jamie.

He was involved in the Spectroscopic Program covering the NBS and U.S. Naval Ordnance Laboratory, Corona, CA, experiences. His inventions significantly advanced the techniques of radiometry and spectrophotometry. He credited the Corona Lab program with the establishment of the atomic wavelength standard in the infrared.

Humphreys attended the Rydberg Centennial Conference on Atomic Spectroscopy in 1954, which at the time was the most distinguished group of spectroscopic and atomic physicists ever assembled, and included the eminent Niels Bohr.

He corresponded with William F. Meggers while in Michigan in 1928.

== Honors and awards ==
- He was elected a Fellow of the American Physical Society in 1941.
- He received the Naval Award for Achievement in Science in 1962.
- He was awarded the William F. Meggers Award in Spectroscopy in 1973.
- He was listed in "World Who's Who in Science" in 1968.

== Works ==
Humphreys is the author of many scientific research articles and books including First spectra of neon, argon, and xenon 136 in the 1.2–4.0 μm region, written in 1973 while he was at Purdue University, Lafayette, Indiana.

Other works include:

- T.L.De Bruin, C.J.Humphreys, and W.F.Meggers, J. Res. NBS (U.S.) 11, 409 (1933).
- "The 29 and 30 electron-system spectra of arsenic and selenium" Curtis J Humphreys, 1928.
- "Element Ne I" Meggers, W. F., and Humphreys, C. J. 1933, J. Res. N. B. S. 10, 427. [EA, 7724-18549, a UMT and RMTsource] C.J.Humphreys, J. Res. NBS (U.S.) 22, 19 (1939). C.J.Humphreys, J. Opt. Soc. Am. 43, 1027 (1953).
- "Humphreys Series" Humphreys, C.J., J. Research Natl. Bur. Standards 1953, 50, 1.
- "Interferometric measurement of wavelengths of infrared atomic emission lines in the extraphotographic region" Applied Optics, 1963. Co-authored Rao, K. Narahari;
- Curtis J. Humphreys; D.H. Rank, "Wavelength Standards in the Infrared", Academic Press, 1966.
- Humphreys, C. J., & Paul, E. 1970, J. Opt. Soc. Am., 60, 1302.
- H.H. Li and C.J. Humphreys and J. Opt. Soc. Am. 64 (1974) 1072.
- C.J. Humphreys, Rep. Prog. Phys. 42 (1979) 122.
