= Andre Ho =

Canadian table tennis player (born 1992)

Andre Ho (born April 11, 1992) is a Canadian table tennis player. He competed at the 2012 Summer Olympics in the Men's singles, but was defeated in the preliminary round. He was also part of the Canadian team that finished 9th. He competed at the 2014 Commonwealth Games, being knocked out in the last 64.

Ho was born in Vancouver, British Columbia and lives in Richmond, British Columbia. Ho is a Chinese Canadian.
