= Dexter St. Louis =

Trinidadian table tennis player (1968–2019)

Dexter St. Louis OLY
Personal information
- Nationality: Trinidad and Tobago
- Born: 21 March 1968
- Died: 16 May 2019 (aged 51) Bordeaux, France
- Height: 1.82 m (5 ft 11 1/2 in)
- Weight: 80 kg (176 lb)

Sport
- Sport: Table tennis
- Club: S.A.G.CESTAS (France)
- Highest ranking: 342 (January 2013)

Dexter Benedict St. Louis (21 March 1968 – 16 May 2019) was a Trinidadian table tennis player. In January 2013, he was ranked no. 342 in the world by the International Table Tennis Federation (ITTF).

St. Louis made his official debut for the 1996 Summer Olympics in Atlanta, Georgia, where he competed in the men's singles. He placed fourth in a group pool round against Brazil's Hugo Hoyama, Sweden's Jörgen Persson, and North Korea's Kim Song-Hui, with a total score of 82 points and a tally of 3 straight losses.

Twelve years after competing in his last Olympics, St. Louis qualified again for the men's singles, as a 40-year-old, at the 2008 Summer Olympics in Beijing, by winning the Latin American Qualification Tournament in Santo Domingo, Dominican Republic. He lost the first preliminary round match to Canada's Zhang Peng, with a unanimous set score of 0–4.
