= 2014 Commonwealth Games =

Multi-sport event in Glasgow, Scotland

XX Commonwealth Games
- Logo of 2014 Commonwealth Games
- Host city: Glasgow, Scotland
- Motto: Bring It On
- Nations: 71 Commonwealth teams
- Athletes: 4,947
- Events: 261 in 18 sports
- Opening: 23 July 2014
- Closing: 3 August 2014
- Opened by: Elizabeth II
- Closed by: Prince Edward, Earl of Wessex
- Queen's Baton Final Runner: Sir Chris Hoy
- Main venue: Celtic Park (opening ceremony); Hampden Park (closing ceremony)
- Website: Glasgow2014.com

The 2014 Commonwealth Games, officially known as the XX Commonwealth Games and commonly known as Glasgow 2014 were an international multi-sport event celebrated in the tradition of the Commonwealth Games as governed by the Commonwealth Games Federation (CGF). It took place in Glasgow, Scotland, from 23 July to 3 August 2014.

Glasgow was selected as the host city on 9 November 2007 during CGF General Assembly in Colombo, Sri Lanka, defeating Abuja, Nigeria. It was the largest multi-sport event ever held in Scotland with around 4,950 athletes from 71 different nations and territories competing in 18 different sports, outranking the 1970 and 1986 Commonwealth Games in Edinburgh.

The Games received acclaim for their organisation, attendance, and the public enthusiasm of the people of Scotland, with CGF chief executive Mike Hooper hailing them as "the standout games in the history of the movement". Held in Scotland for the third time, the Games were notable for the successes of the Home Nations of the United Kingdom, with England, Wales and hosts Scotland achieving their largest ever gold medal hauls and overall medal hauls at a Commonwealth Games. England finished top of the medal table for the first time since the 1986 Commonwealth Games, also held in Scotland. Kiribati also won its first ever medal at a Commonwealth Games, a gold in the 105 kg men's weightlifting competition. These were the final Commonwealth Games to be opened by Elizabeth II; the final two Games of her reign—in 2018 and 2022—were opened by her son, the then-Prince Charles.

== Host selection ==
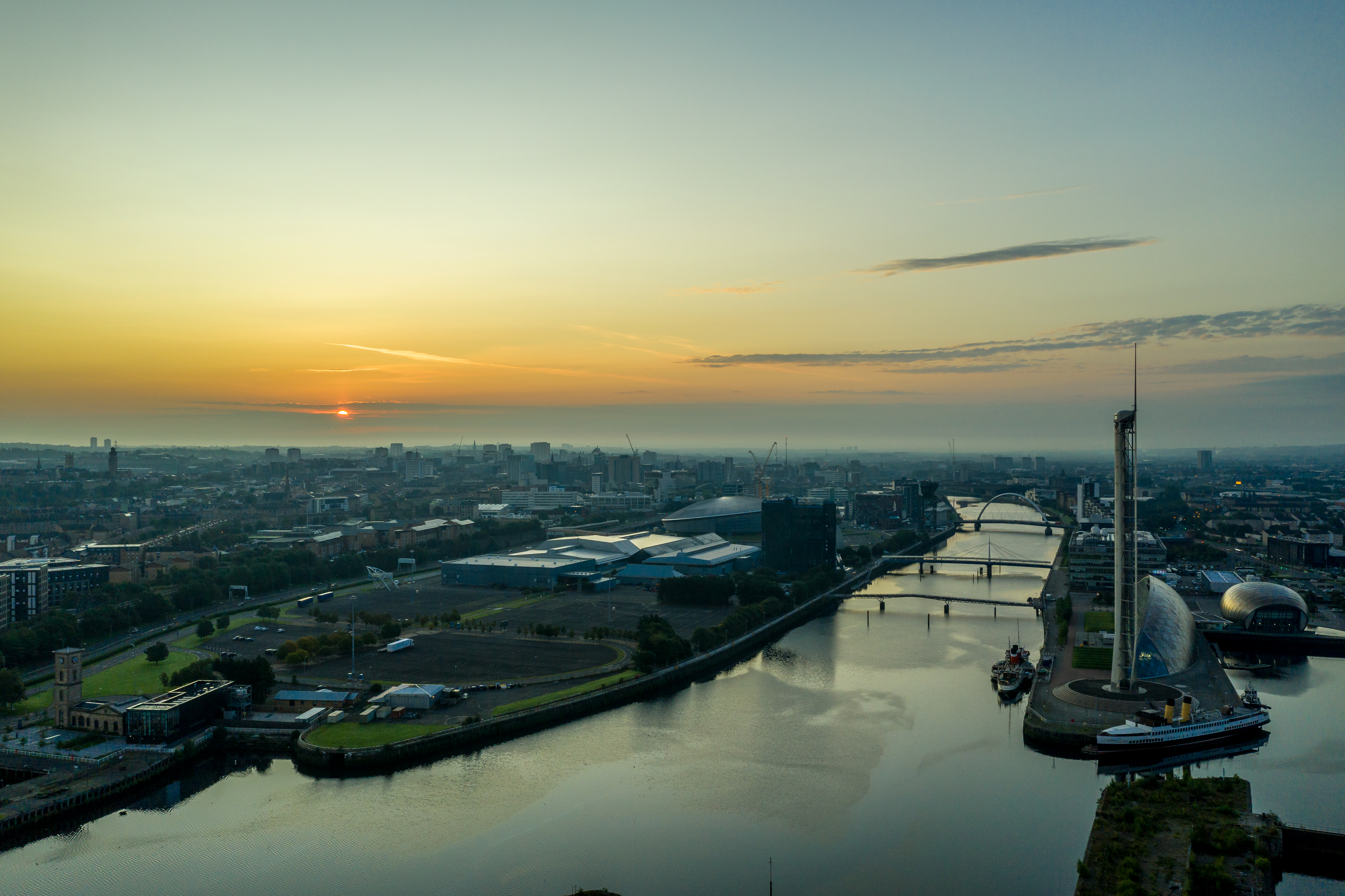
Glasgow was selected by the Commonwealth Games Council for Scotland as the main Scottish candidate city for the 2014 Commonwealth Games

Scotland was the first country to consider hosting the 2014 Commonwealth Games in 2004, with Scottish cities being invited by the Commonwealth Games Council for Scotland to consider making a bid. In September 2004, Glasgow was announced as the Scottish candidate city over Edinburgh (which hosted the Games in 1970 and 1986, and the inaugural Commonwealth Youth Games in 2000) following a cost-benefit analysis by the Commonwealth Games Council for Scotland. The Scottish Executive under then First Minister of Scotland, Jack McConnell, with the support of the United Kingdom government and all main parties in the Scottish Parliament, formally announced Glasgow's intention to host the games on 16 August 2005.

In March 2006, the bidding process began, with the Glasgow Bidding team presenting their case to the Commonwealth Games Federation at the 2006 Commonwealth Games in Melbourne, along with the other confirmed candidate cities; the Nigerian capital, Abuja and Halifax in Canada. In October 2006, the first voting delegates arrived in Glasgow, to inspect the city's existing and proposed amenities and facilities. Glasgow announced on 16 January 2007, the 17 sports to be included should its bid be successful. Halifax later withdrew its bid on 8 March 2007, following the withdrawal of funding from the provincial government.

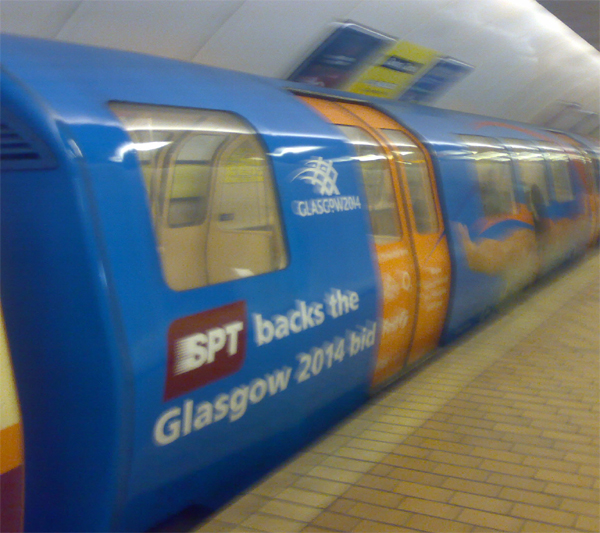
Special liveries in support of Glasgow's bid were applied to numerous subway carriages.

That left Abuja and Glasgow as the remaining bidders, with Abuja seen as a likely favourite due to the basis of its campaign that an African nation has never before hosted the Commonwealth Games. The deadline for formal submission of bids to the Commonwealth Games Federation, in the form of a Candidate City File, was set for May 2007. Both bids were highly recommended, though Glasgow's bid team had made use of extensive benchmarking against the 2002 Commonwealth Games in Manchester and the 2006 Commonwealth Games in Melbourne and as a result, its bid was deemed technically superior according to the CGF Evaluation Report that was released in September 2007. The Commonwealth Games Evaluation Commission concluded that: "Glasgow has shown it has the ability to stage the 2014 Commonwealth Games to a standard which would continue to enhance the image and prestige of the Games." This put Glasgow ahead in terms of the technical comprehensiveness of its bid.

The final decision on the host city of the 2014 Commonwealth Games was held in Colombo, Sri Lanka on 9 November 2007 at the Commonwealth Games Federation General Assembly, attended by all 71 Commonwealth Games member associations. Each bid city made a presentation to the General Assembly, the order of which was determined by drawing lots. Glasgow's delegation was led by Louise Martin, chair of the Commonwealth Games Council for Scotland, First Minister Alex Salmond, athlete Jamie Quarry and Leader of Glasgow City Council Steven Purcell. The presentation also included a promotional film narrated by Sean Connery. Abuja's delegation was led by General Yakubu Gowon, head of the Abuja 2014 Commonwealth Games bid team.

The CGF members later voted for their preferred candidate in a secret ballot. As there were only two bids, the winner was announced by the CGF President, Mike Fennel, after the first round of voting, with the winner only requiring a simple majority. The results of the bidding process were as follows:

2014 Commonwealth Games bidding results
City	Country	Votes
Glasgow	Scotland	47
Abuja	Nigeria	24

== Development and preparation ==
The Glasgow 2014 Organising Committee was responsible for organising and delivering the Games. It was established as a limited company whose members included the Scottish Government, Glasgow City Council and Commonwealth Games Scotland. Glasgow City Council was responsible for delivering a number of the venues and lasting benefits from the Games for the city and people of Glasgow. The Scottish Government was the third organisation in the partnership and was the main funder of the Games. Lord Robert Smith was the chairman of the Glasgow 2014 Organising Committee.

=== Venues ===
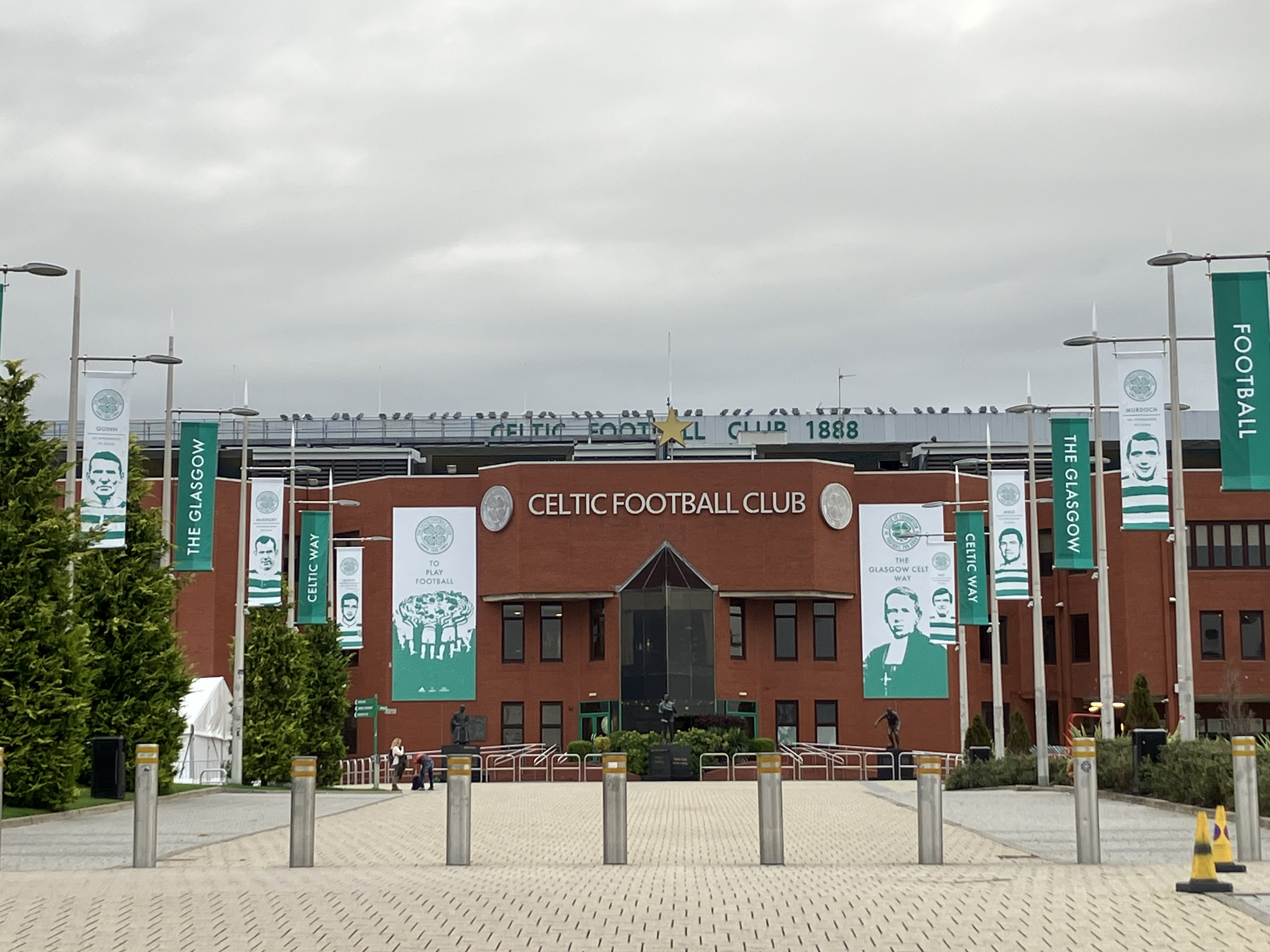
Celtic Park hosted the opening ceremony

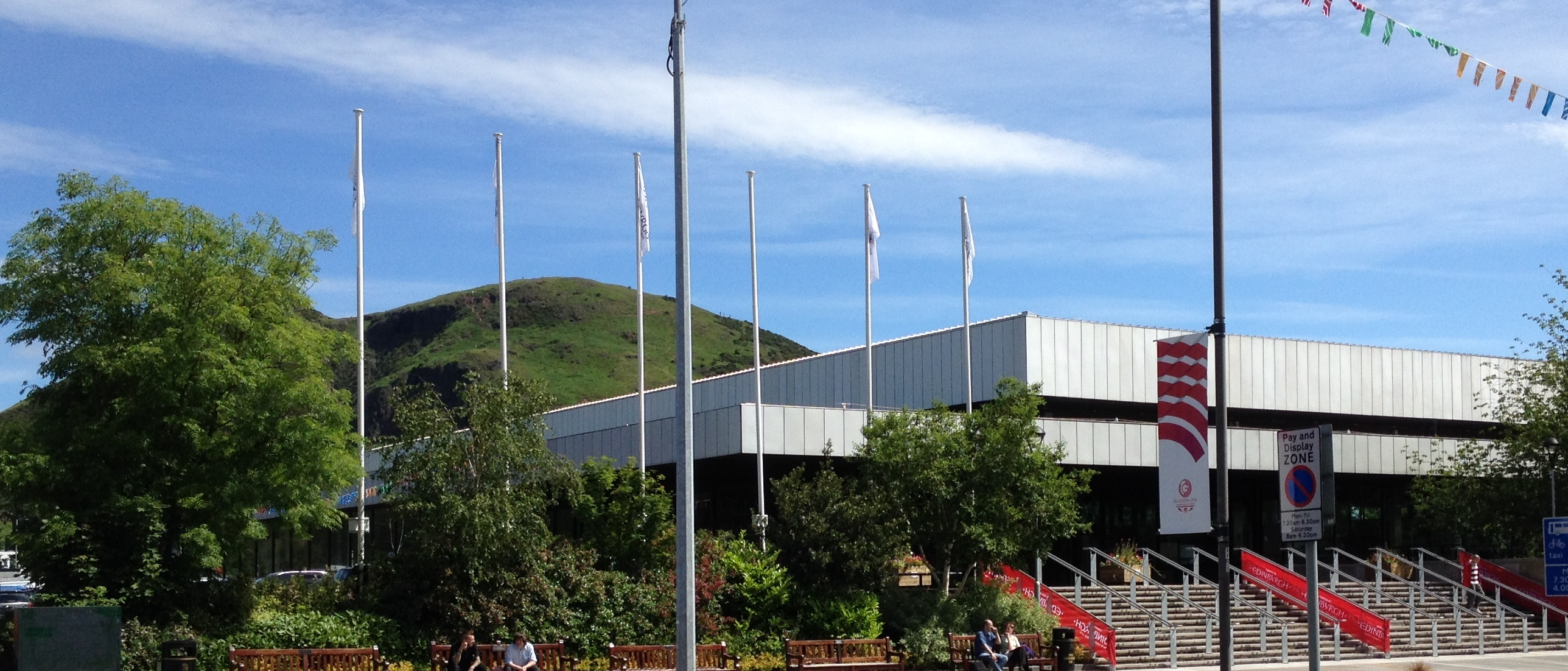
Royal Commonwealth Pool hosted Diving events

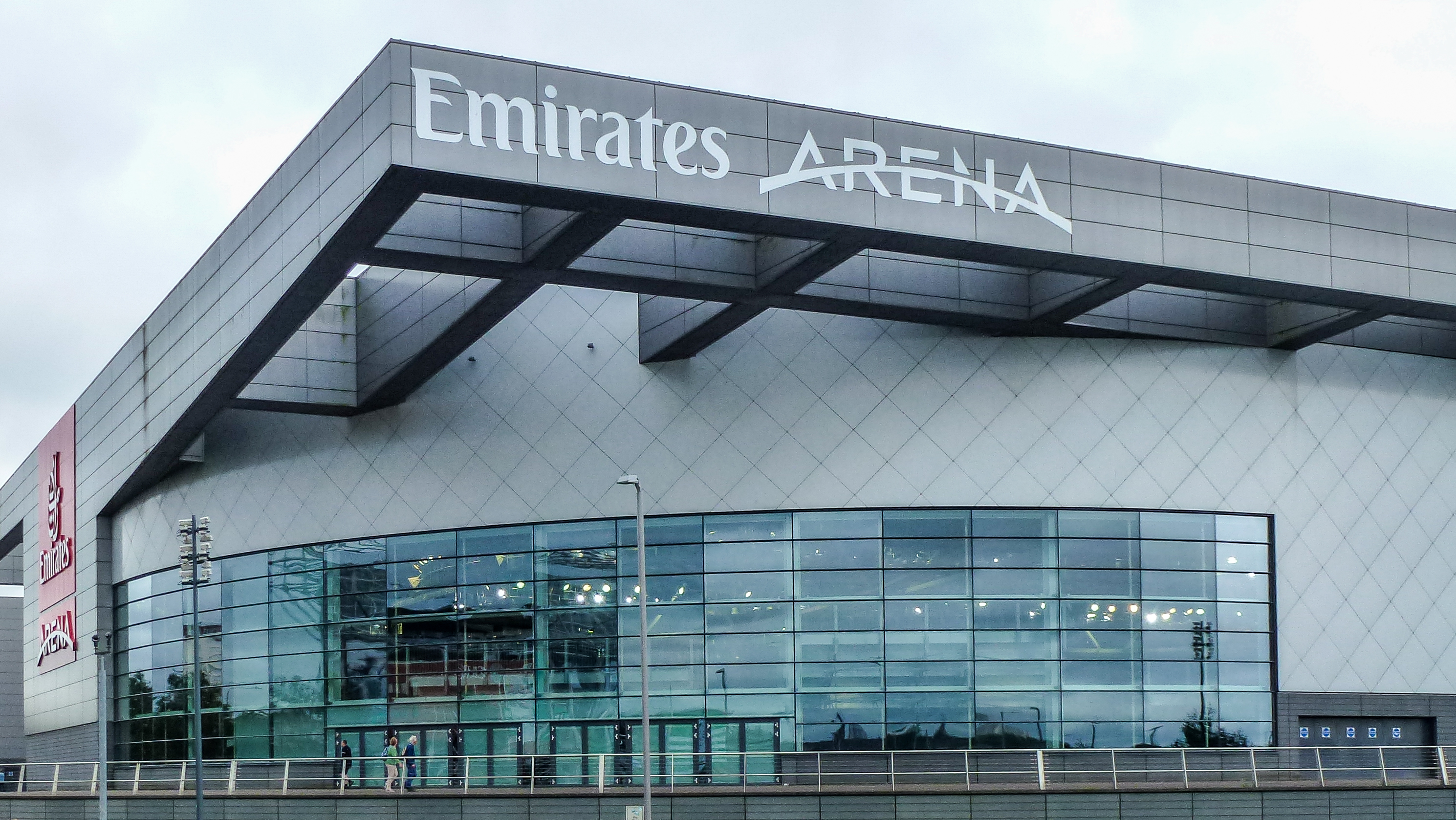
Commonwealth Arena and Sir Chris Hoy Velodrome hosted the Badminton and Track Cycling events

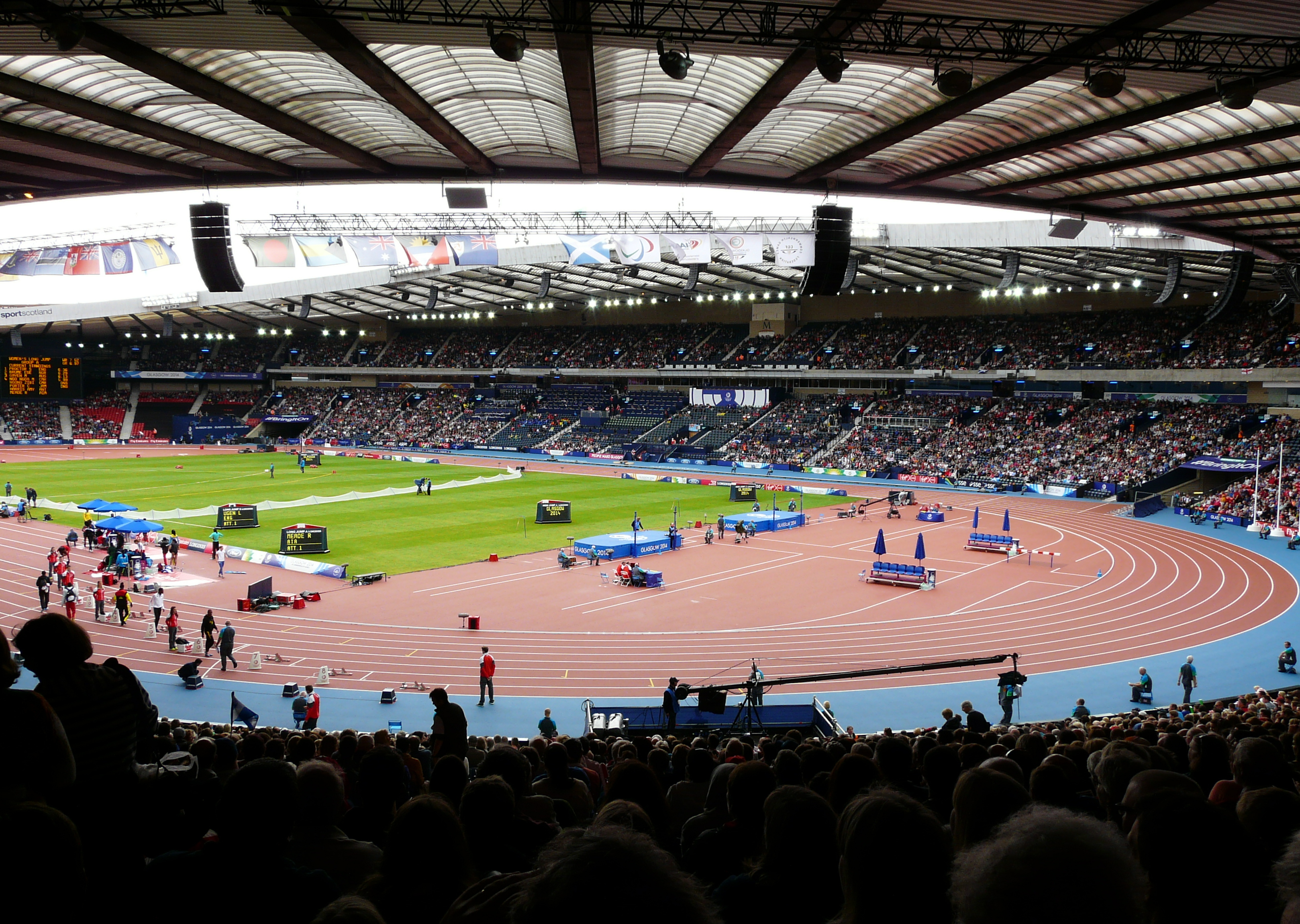
Hampden Park hosted athletics and closing ceremony

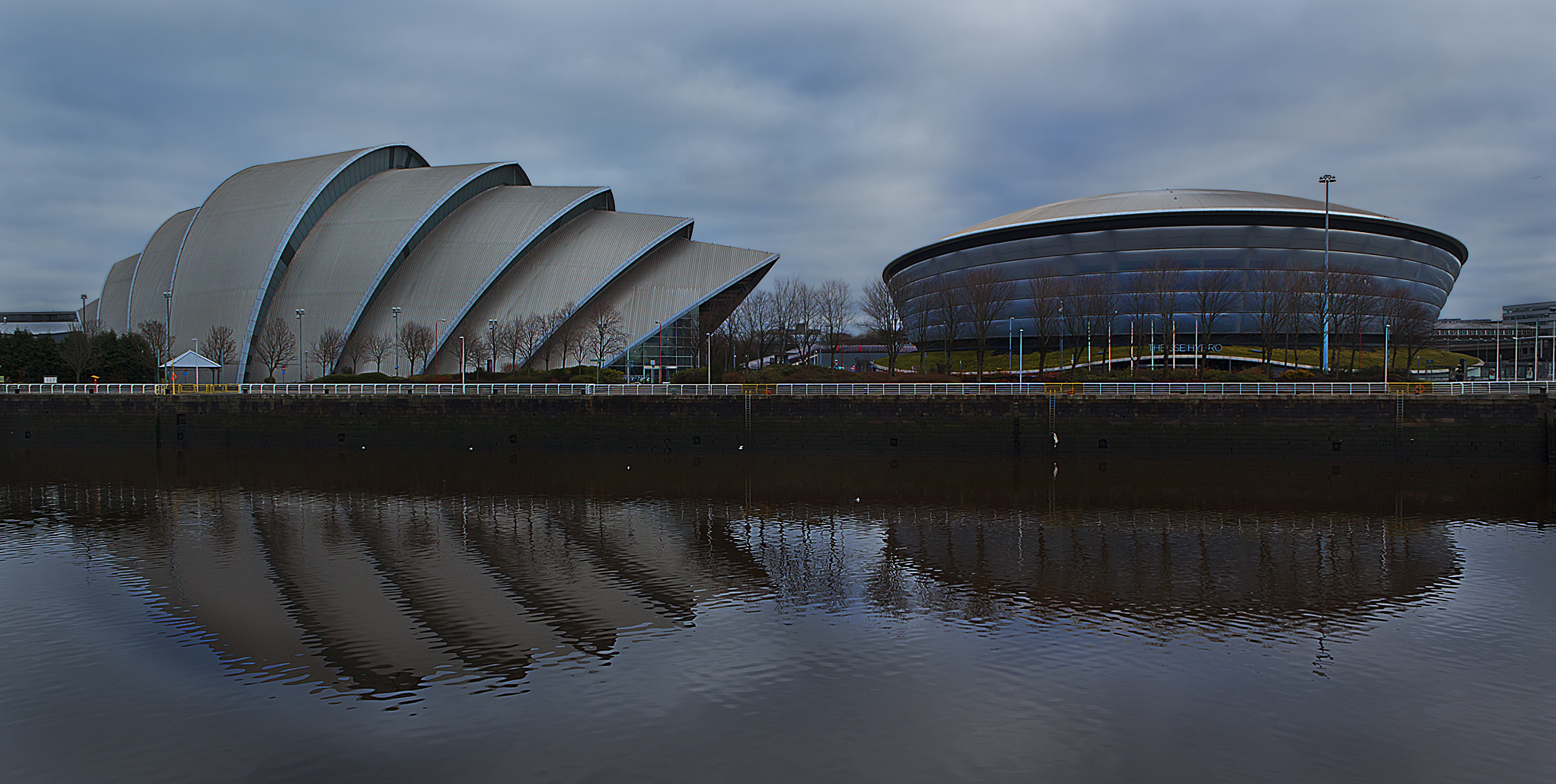
The Clyde Auditorium hosted Weightlifting and SSE Hydro hosted Gymnastics and Netball events

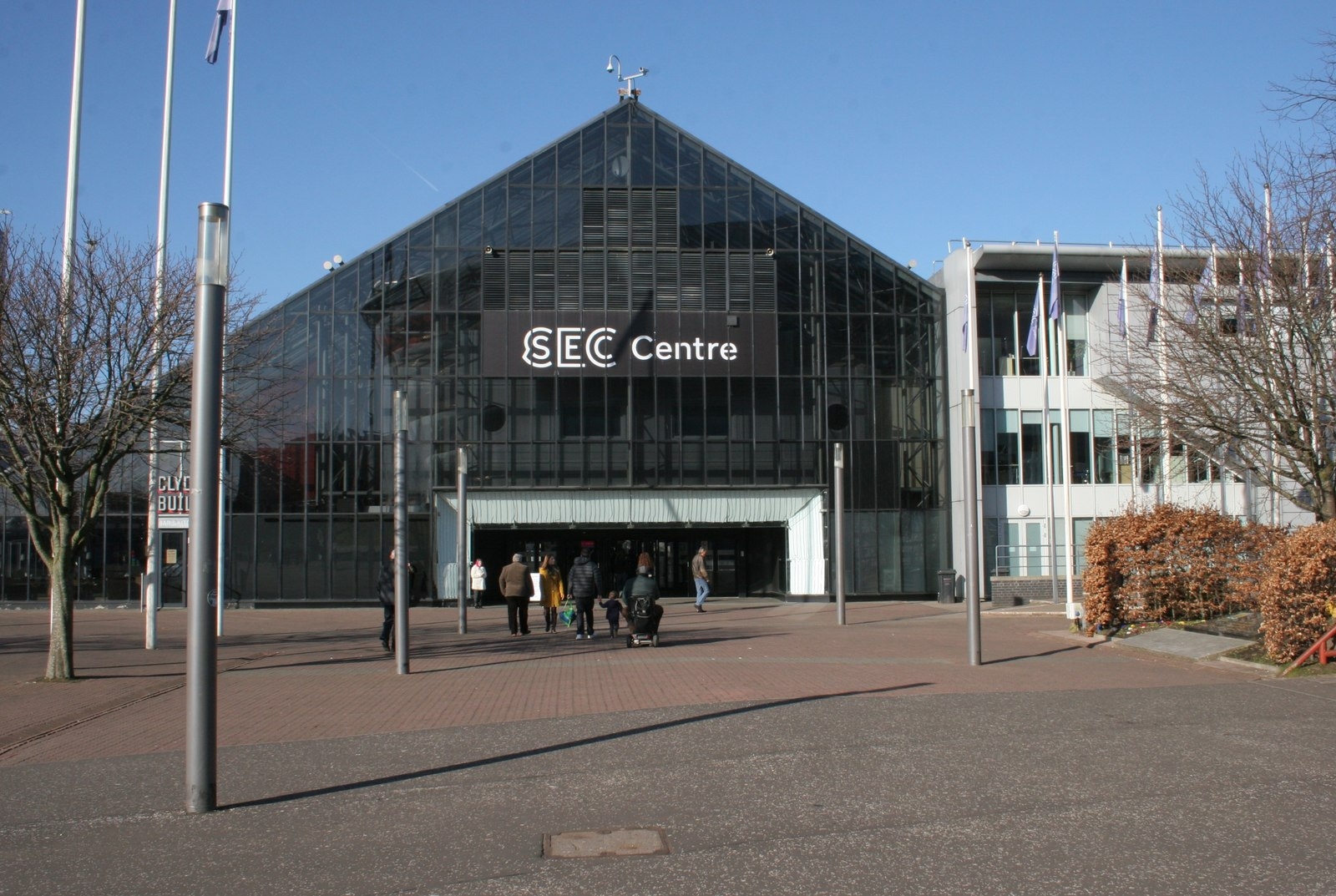
Scottish Exhibition and Conference Centre

Celtic Park hosted for the opening ceremony of the Games. The Commonwealth Arena and Sir Chris Hoy Velodrome precinct, situated at Parkhead in the East End of the city, hosted the Badminton as well as Track cycling. Glasgow Green was the starting point for the free Athletics (Marathon), Cycling (Road Race) and Cycling (Time Trial) events. Glasgow Green was the venue for Field hockey and saw the construction of a new Glasgow Green Hockey Centre. Tollcross International Swimming Centre, was the venue for Swimming events. It already had one Olympic standard 50 metre swimming pool, which was extensively upgraded, and a second 50-metre pool was added for the Games as a warm-up facility. The existing permanent seating capacity was increased by 1,000. Combined with additional temporary seating the venue had over 5,000 seats for the Games.

Ibrox Stadium, in the South Side, was the venue for the Rugby Sevens tournament. Mountain biking was held on the Cathkin Braes in Rutherglen, the Royal Burgh neighbouring the city. Hampden Park hosted all the track and field events as well as the closing ceremony.

The Scottish Exhibition and Conference Centre, located in the West End of the city, hosted the Wrestling, Judo and Boxing, as well as the Main Press Centre and the International Broadcast Centre, benefiting from its strategic position adjacent to the headquarters of BBC Scotland and STV at Pacific Quay. The Clyde Auditorium hosted Weightlifting, whilst the new OVO Hydro was used for the Gymnastics and Netball events. Kelvingrove Park, also in the city's West End, was the venue for Bowls and has five bowling greens installed for competitive use. A comprehensive upgrade and refurbishment of the park was completed ahead of the Games. Scotstoun Leisure Centre hosted Table tennis and Squash.

The Shooting competitions took place at the Ministry of Defence full-bore rifle and clay target ranges at Barry Buddon, near Dundee, which were also used in the 1986 Commonwealth Games. There were temporary ranges built for the small-bore rifle and pistol events. Diving was held at the Royal Commonwealth Pool in Edinburgh, located 45 miles (72 km) to the east, which held the annual Edinburgh Festival at the same time as the 2014 Commonwealth Games. Strathclyde Country Park, beside Hamilton and Motherwell, hosted the Triathlon event.

=== Athletes' village ===
The Athletes' Village for the 2014 Commonwealth Games was situated on a 35-hectare (86-acre) site, in Dalmarnock, Glasgow. The whole project was designed by RMJM. Primarily the site was used as accommodation for the athletes competing in the games as well as team officials from every competing nation for the duration of the games. As well as accommodation, the athletes' village also housed a retail zone, dining hall, medical facilities, gym, religious centre and recreational spaces.

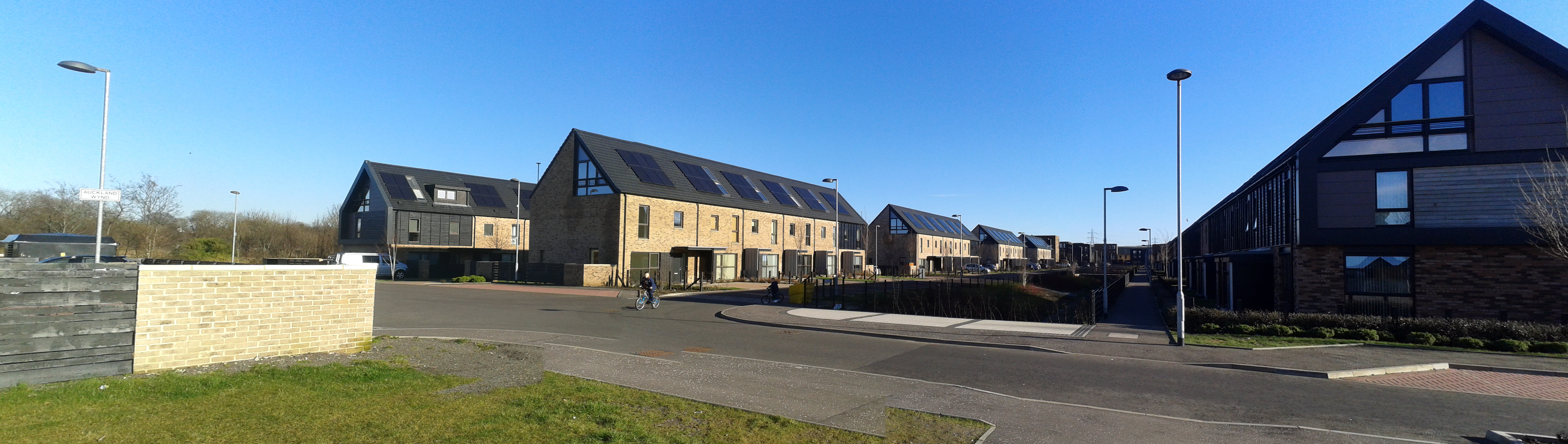
The 2014 Commonwealth Games athletes' village at Dalmarnock, Glasgow

=== Countdown ===
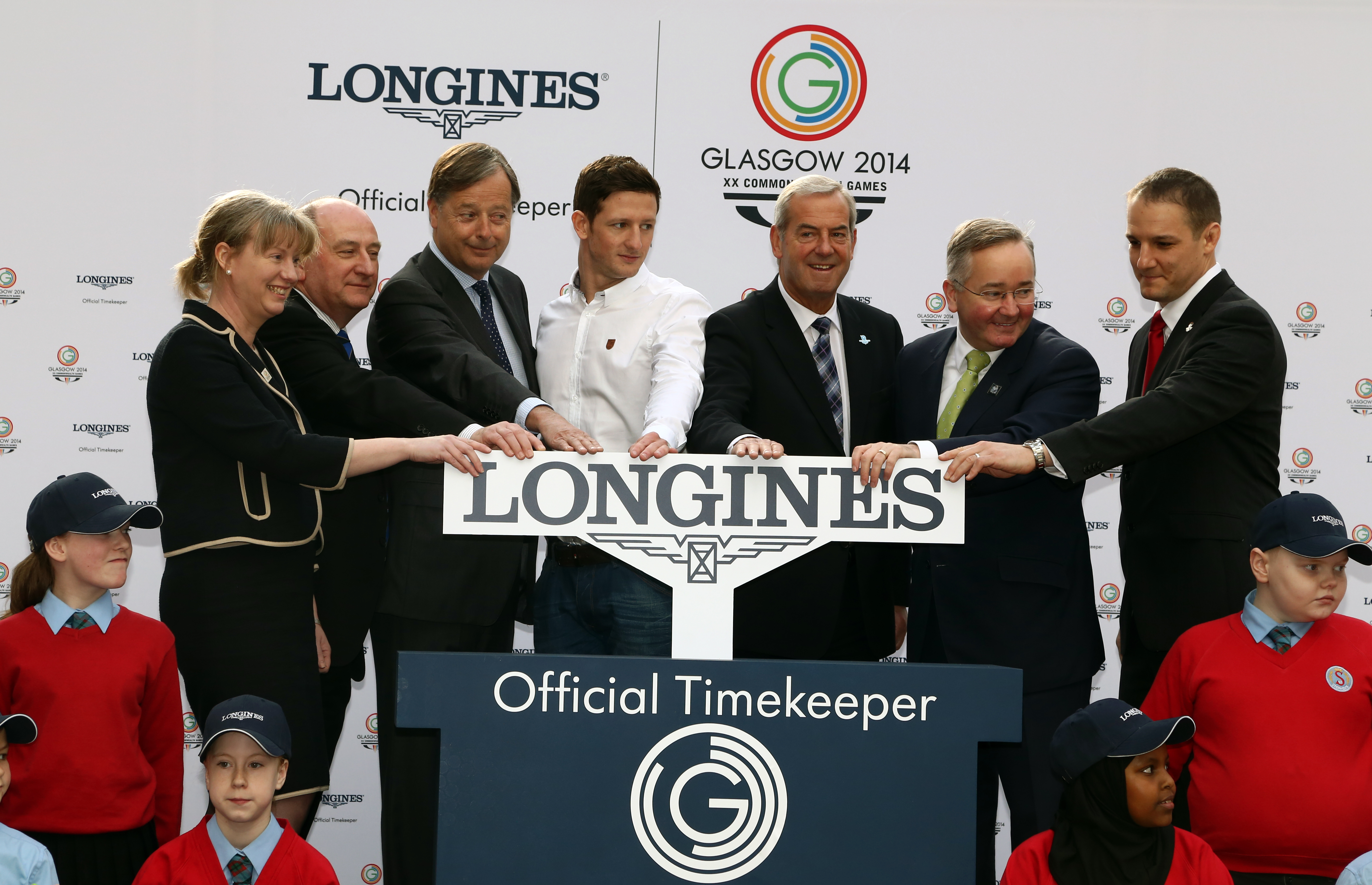
Launch of the countdown clock of Glasgow 2014.

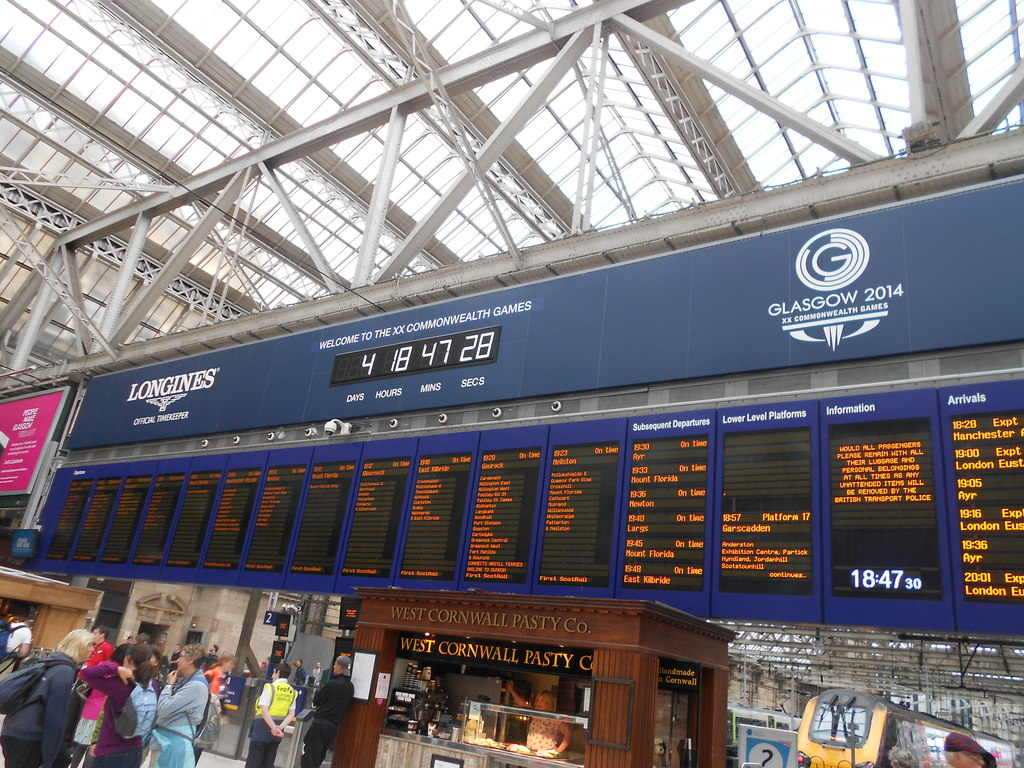
Glasgow 2014 countdown clock at the Glasgow Central railway station

The countdown clock was unveiled at the Glasgow Central Station on 10 March 2014 during the Commonwealth Day. The clock was sponsored by the Swiss watchmaker Longines. A special ceremony was organized for the clock inauguration at the station which was attended by the members of the organising committee of the Games and Scottish swimmer Michael Jamieson.

=== Budget ===
The total budget for the Games was £575.6 million. This figure included £472.3 million for Glasgow 2014 and £90 million for security. The Glasgow 2014 budget of £472.3 million was made up of £372 million of public money with the remainder coming from commercial income generated through sponsorship, ticket sales, broadcasting rights and merchandise sales. The budget included contingency of £66.1 million, which was made up of a £42.3 million general contingency and £23.8 million special reserves. In February 2015, it was reported that the Games was delivered £35.5 million under budget.

=== Ticketing ===
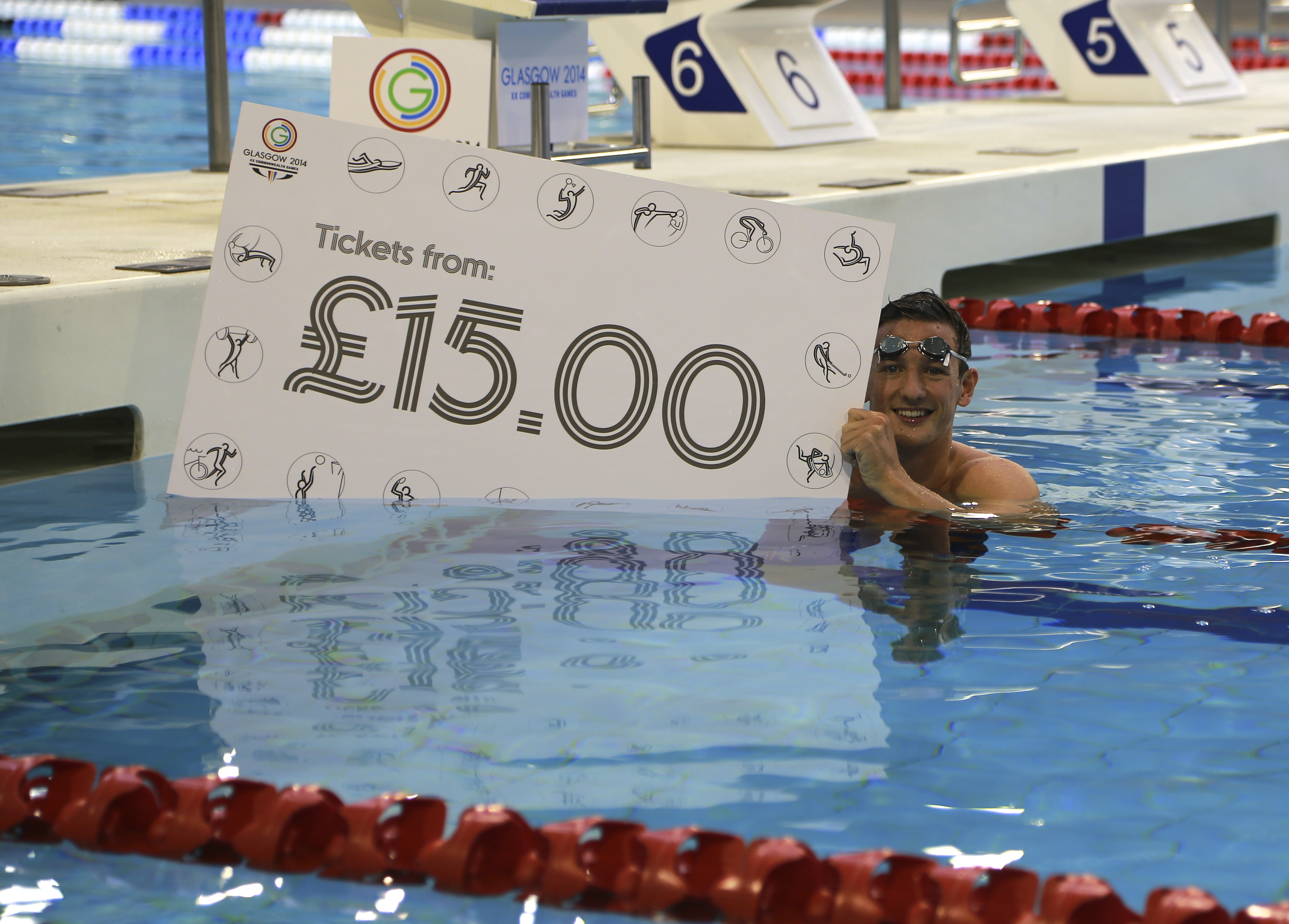
Launch of the tickets to Glasgow 2014 going on sale

The first round of the Games ticket sales were from 19 August to 16 September 2013. Over two-thirds of tickets sold were priced at £25 or less. The ticket price ranges for the opening ceremony and the closing ceremony were £40-£250 and £30-£200 respectively. The 100m men's final event received over 100,000 applications which was the most of any event of the Games. Boxing had the most expensive ticket of any sport in the Games whose category 1 tickets cost £120. A total of 96% of tickets were sold. Ticketmaster was the official ticket services provider of the Games.

=== Medals ===
The medals for the Games were unveiled on 14 April 2014 at the Kelvingrove Art Gallery and Museum in Glasgow. The medals were designed and hand-crafted by the renowned jeweller Jonathan Boyd and a team of specialist jewellery-makers from the prestigious Glasgow School of Art. The hand-turned quaichs gifted to winning athletes and the carved ceremonial podiums were all created from local woods by Glasgow-based artisan Paul Hodgkiss. Scottish designer Kerry Nixon designed the medalbearers' dresses.

=== Queen's baton relay ===
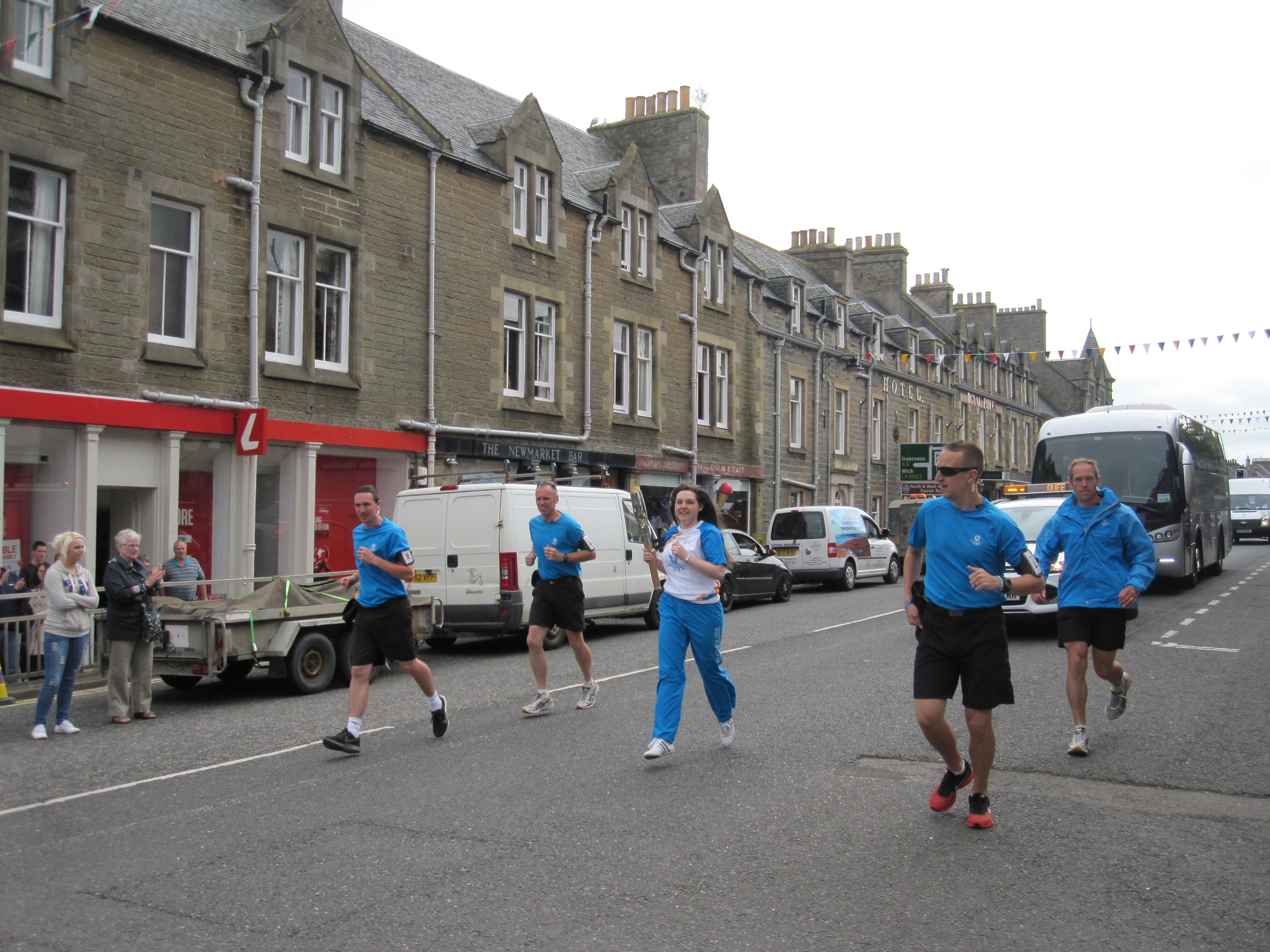
Queen's Baton Relay in Thurso, Scotland

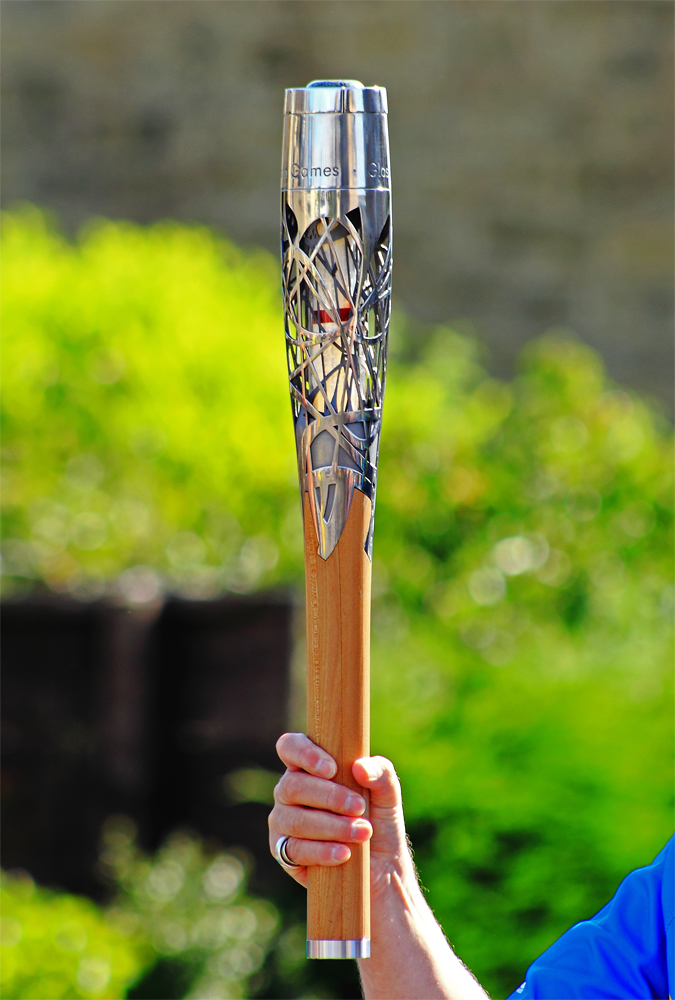
Queen's Baton

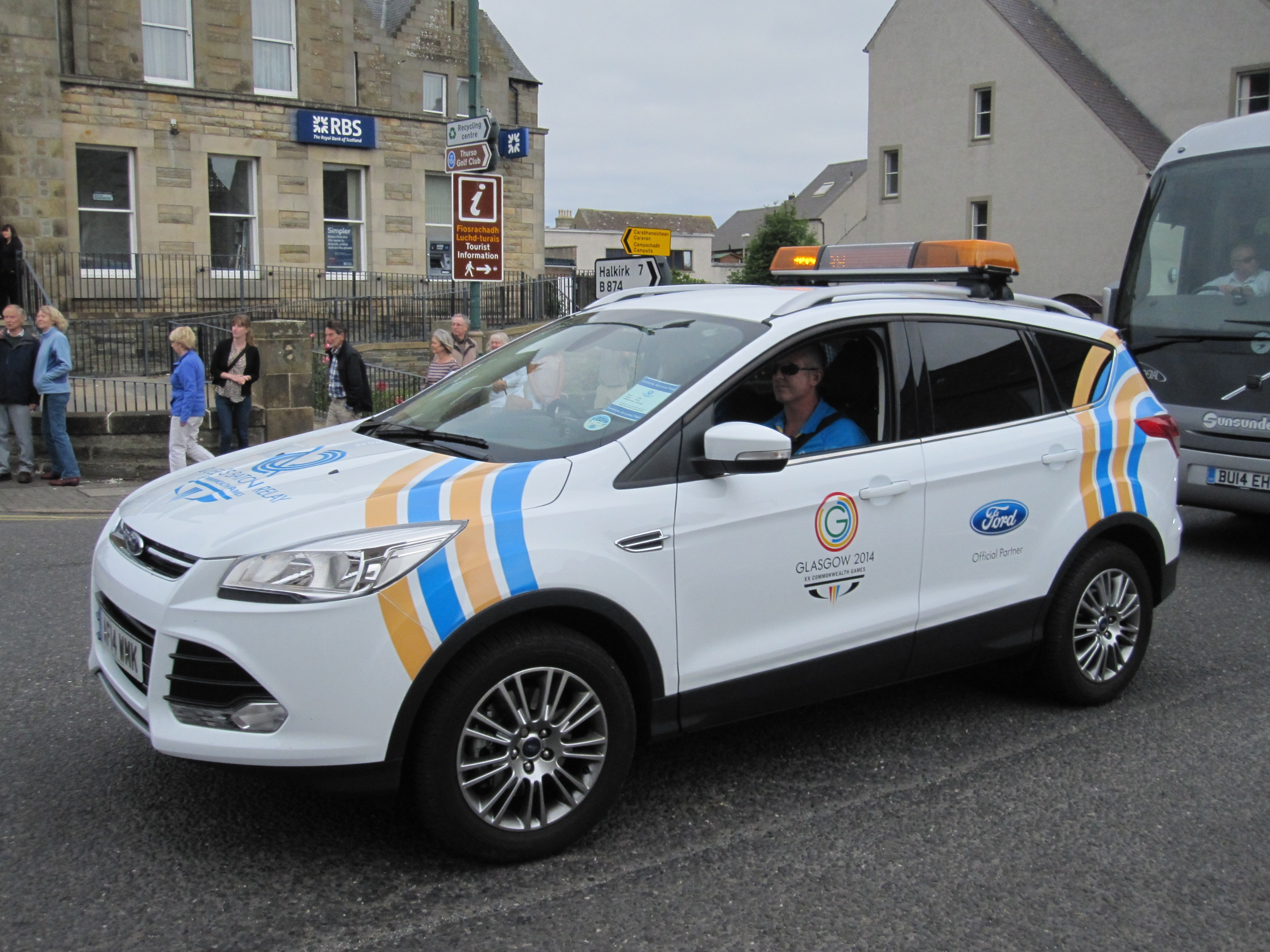
Ford Kuga at the rear of the Queen's Baton Relay, in Olrig Street in Thurso

The Queen's Baton Relay began its 190,000 km journey on 9 October 2013. The baton travelled via 70 nations and territories over 288 days before opening the games on 23 July 2014. At the ceremony, 32 volunteers from across Scotland carried the baton around Celtic Park Stadium after being nominated for giving their time to developing the nation's youth through sport. The baton was then passed to Sir Chris Hoy, who delivered it to President of the Commonwealth Games Federation Prince Imran and the Queen who then declared the games open.

The Queen's Baton was designed by the Glasgow-based firm 4c Design. The BBC provided coverage of the relay. Adventurer Mark Beaumont presented a series of documentaries filmed on the relay for BBC One Scotland, there were also weekly updates for BBC News and a BBC News website and blog written by Mark.

=== Transport ===
Glasgow Airport was used to welcome and depart the athletes and officials of the Games. The main terminal building of Glasgow Airport was upgraded at a cost of £17 million.

During the games, spectators were encouraged to use the public transport, particularly for longer journeys as they make their way to the venues of the games. The Glasgow 2014 ticket included access to local public transport services (trains, buses and Subway) to and from the venue on the day of the event. In order to access those services, the spectators had to show the valid event ticket on request. The spectators were also encouraged to walk or use bicycles instead of motor vehicles to reach the venues in order to avoid traffic jam.

The athletes were transported in minibuses or coaches, which used, where necessary, dedicated lanes – known as the Games Route Network – to ensure they were given priority over other traffic in a similar way buses are in bus lanes. These lanes formed part of a larger dedicated Games Route Network that was also used by the people working on the Games.

=== Volunteering ===
Approximately 12,500 volunteers were hired for the Games out of over 50,000 applicants which was more than the number who applied for Melbourne 2006 and Manchester 2002. The army of volunteers enlisted to help during the Games were known as Clyde-siders. The uniforms for the volunteers were created by the outdoor clothing manufacturer Trespass.

=== Security ===
An integrated security team which involved Police Scotland, Glasgow 2014's Security team and private sector partners, was developed to manage the security and stewarding requirements for the Games. More than 17,000 individuals were involved in this operation, where over 2,000 members were from the armed forces and the rest from the Police Scotland and 17 private sector companies. The budget for the Games security was around £90 million.

=== Opening ceremony ===
The programme, which included about 2,000 performers, featured Karen Dunbar, John Barrowman, Amy Macdonald, Rod Stewart, Susan Boyle, Nicola Benedetti, Julie Fowlis, Eric Whitacre, and Pumeza Matshikiza, as well as a message from the International Space Station. The ceremony began with a countdown and a recorded video message from Scottish actor Ewan McGregor, explaining the partnership between the Games and UNICEF. Following the arrival of the Queen there was a flypast by the Red Arrows display team. The venue featured the largest LED video screen in Europe, supplied by Sports Technology. Scotland's then First Minister Alex Salmond welcomed the participants and spectators, and introduced a moment of silence in memory of the Malaysia Airlines Flight 17 disaster. The final part of the Queen's Baton Relay was run by 32 Scottish volunteers nominated for giving their time to developing the nation's youth through sport. The baton was then passed to Sir Chris Hoy, who delivered it to President of the Commonwealth Games Federation Prince Imran and the Queen. The display of the message concealed within the baton was delayed by a difficulty in opening the device. The Games were launched in partnership with UNICEF, to save and change children's lives. The unique partnership aimed "to use the power of sport to reach every child in Scotland and benefit children in every Commonwealth nation and territory." In the culmination of a groundbreaking partnership with UNICEF, the ceremony inspired millions to text donations to our shared 'Put Children First' campaign, which raised £3.5 million on the night and more than £5 million to date. The ceremony was directed by David Zolkwer with David Proctor (Executive Producer) and Sarah Gardiner (Creative Producer).

=== Closing ceremony ===
The closing ceremony took a visual theme of a music festival, with performers, tents, and flags within the stadium. The ceremony began with Scottish singer Lulu welcoming the athletes of the games. Scottish band Deacon Blue performed their signature song "Dignity". During this the workers of Glasgow were recognised as they paraded along the front of the main stand at Hampden, some on foot, others in their work vehicles. Local band Prides performed their hit song "Messiah". Speeches followed, with Prince Imran telling the crowd that the games were "pure dead brilliant", a local Glaswegian term. The games were officially closed and handed over to the Gold Coast for 2018, who began their own performance with Australian singer Jessica Mauboy. Kylie Minogue then performed a seven-hit songs set list, while the volunteer cast told the story of "a typical Glasgow night out". Her costume was designed by Jean Paul Gaultier and headpiece designed by millinery designer Lara Jensen. The show ended with Dougie MacLean performing Caledonia with the other performers, and a performance of "Auld Lang Syne". The closing ceremony was directed by David Zolkwer with David Proctor (Executive Producer) and Sarah Gardiner (Creative Producer).

== The Games ==
=== Participating Commonwealth Games Associations ===
There were 71 participating nations at the 2014 Commonwealth Games with approximately 4,950 competing athletes, making it one of the largest Commonwealth Games staged to date. On 7 October 2013, The Gambia, having withdrawn from the Commonwealth five days earlier, confirmed that it would not be taking part in the Games.

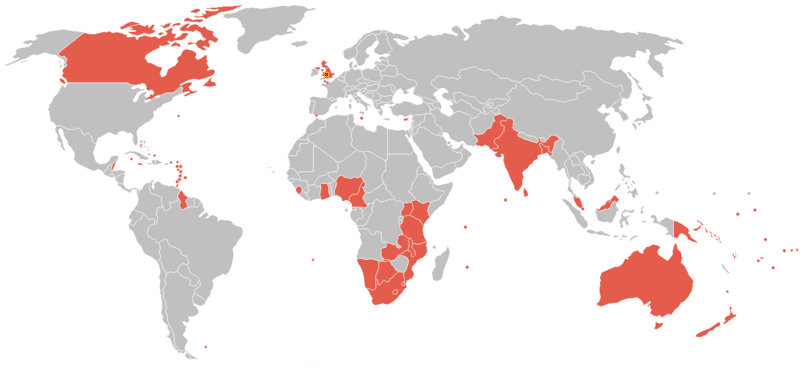
Nations that competed at the 2014 Commonwealth Games in Glasgow

Participating Commonwealth Games Associations
- Anguilla (12)
- Antigua and Barbuda (20)
- Australia (417)
- Bahamas (53)
- Bangladesh (30)
- Barbados (63)
- Belize (12)
- Bermuda (18)
- Botswana (18)
- British Virgin Islands (10)
- Brunei (1)
- Cameroon (62)
- Canada (265)
- Cayman Islands (28)
- Cook Islands (26)
- Cyprus (51)
- Dominica (11)
- England (416)
- Falkland Islands (25)
- Fiji (26)
- Ghana (104)
- Gibraltar (27)
- Grenada (16)
- Guernsey (39)
- Guyana (28)
- India (215)
- Isle of Man (46)
- Jamaica (114)
- Jersey (40)
- Kenya (184)
- Kiribati (20)
- Lesotho (27)
- Malawi (30)
- Malaysia (180)
- Maldives (25)
- Malta (29)
- Mauritius (62)
- Montserrat (4)
- Mozambique (17)
- Namibia (35)
- Nauru (10)
- New Zealand (238)
- Nigeria (127)
- Niue (26)
- Norfolk Island (24)
- Northern Ireland (117)
- Pakistan (62)
- Papua New Guinea (93)
- Rwanda (21)
- Saint Helena (10)
- Saint Kitts and Nevis (12)
- Saint Lucia (32)
- Saint Vincent and the Grenadines (27)
- Samoa (41)
- Scotland (310) (hosts)
- Seychelles (39)
- Sierra Leone (23)
- Singapore (70)
- Solomon Islands (12)
- South Africa (187)
- Sri Lanka (103)
- Swaziland (15)
- Tanzania (36)
- Tonga (15)
- Trinidad and Tobago (127)
- Turks and Caicos Islands (9)
- Tuvalu (5)
- Uganda (62)
- Vanuatu (12)
- Wales (234)
- Zambia (47)

=== Calendar ===
The following table shows a summary of the competition schedule.

All times are in BST (UTC+1)

OC	Opening ceremony	●	Event competitions	1	Gold medal events	CC	Closing ceremony

July/August 2014		July									August			Events
July/August 2014		23rd Wed	24th Thu	25th Fri	26th Sat	27th Sun	28th Mon	29th Tue	30th Wed	31st Thu	1st Fri	2nd Sat	3rd Sun	Events
Ceremonies		OC											CC	—N/a
Aquatics	Diving								3	2	3	2		54
Aquatics	Swimming		6	8	7	7	8	8						54
Athletics						4	7	7	7	9	7	9		50
Badminton			●	●	●	●	1	●	●	●	●	●	5	6
Boxing				●	●	●	●	●	●	●	●	13		11
Cycling	Mountain biking							2						23
Cycling	Road cycling									2			2	23
Cycling	Track cycling		4	4	5	4								23
Gymnastics	Artistic						●	2	2	5	5			20
Gymnastics	Rhythmic		1	1	4									20
Hockey			●	●	●	●	●	●	●	●	●	1	1	2
Judo			5	4	5									14
Lawn bowls			●	●	1	2	2	●	●	2	3			10
Netball			●	●	●	●	●	●	●	●	●	●	1	1
Rugby sevens					●	1								1
Shooting				3	5	2	4	5						19
Squash			●	●	●	●	2	●	●	●	●	1	2	5
Table tennis			●	●	●	1	1	●	●	●	2	3		7
Triathlon			2		1									3
Weightlifting			2	2	2	2	2	2	2	1		4		19
Wrestling								5	5	4				14
Daily medal events			20	22	30	23	27	31	19	25	20	33	11	261
Cumulative total			20	42	72	95	122	153	172	197	217	250	261	261
July/August 2014		23rd Wed	24th Thu	25th Fri	26th Sat	27th Sun	28th Mon	29th Tue	30th Wed	31st Thu	1st Fri	2nd Sat	3rd Sun	Total events
July/August 2014		July									August			Total events

=== Sports ===
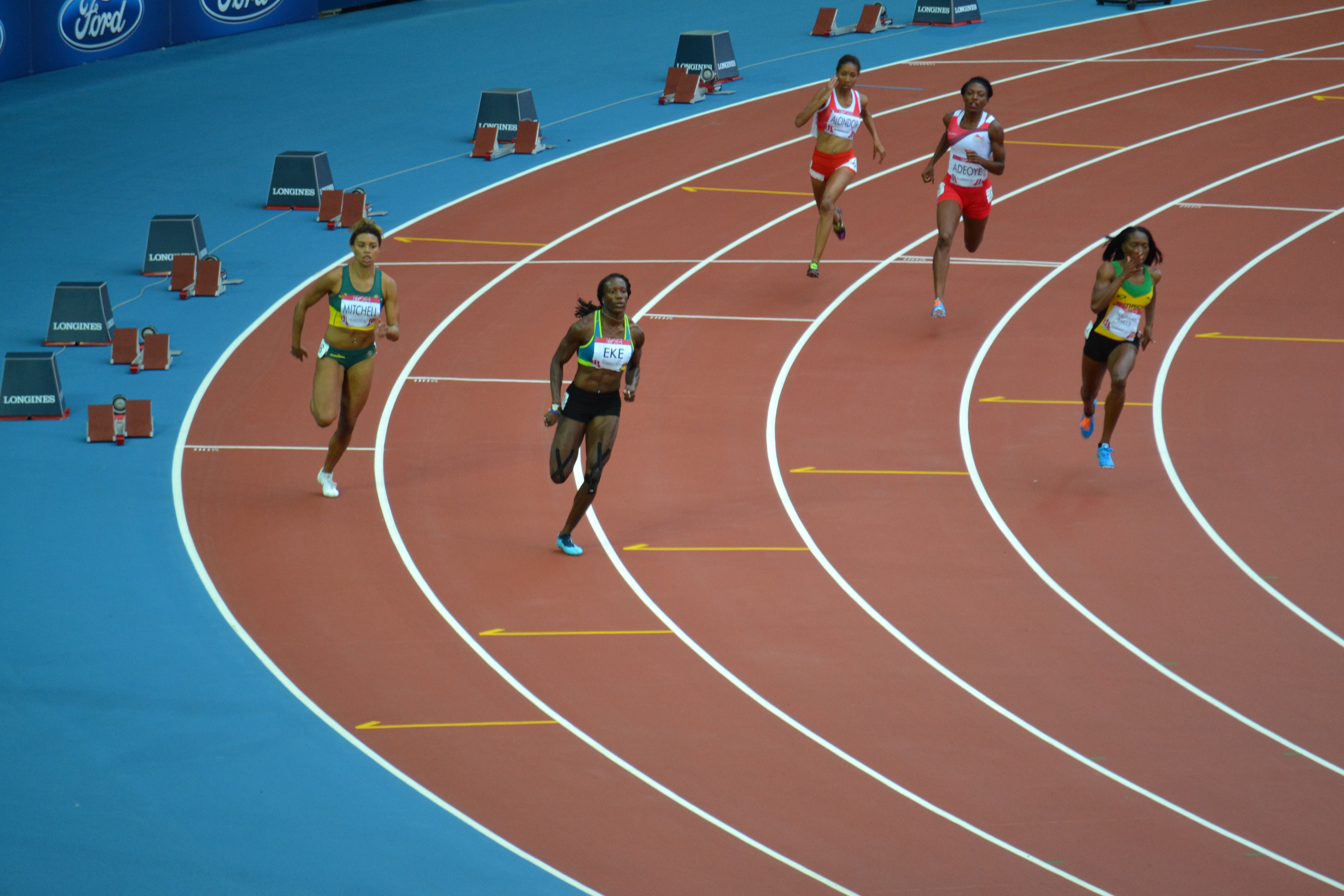
Athletics at the Hampden Park

A total of 18 sports and 261 medal events were contested at the 2014 Commonwealth Games.

A record 22 para-sport events were contested in five different sports (athletics, cycling, lawn bowls, swimming and weightlifting) and para track cycling was held for the very first time.

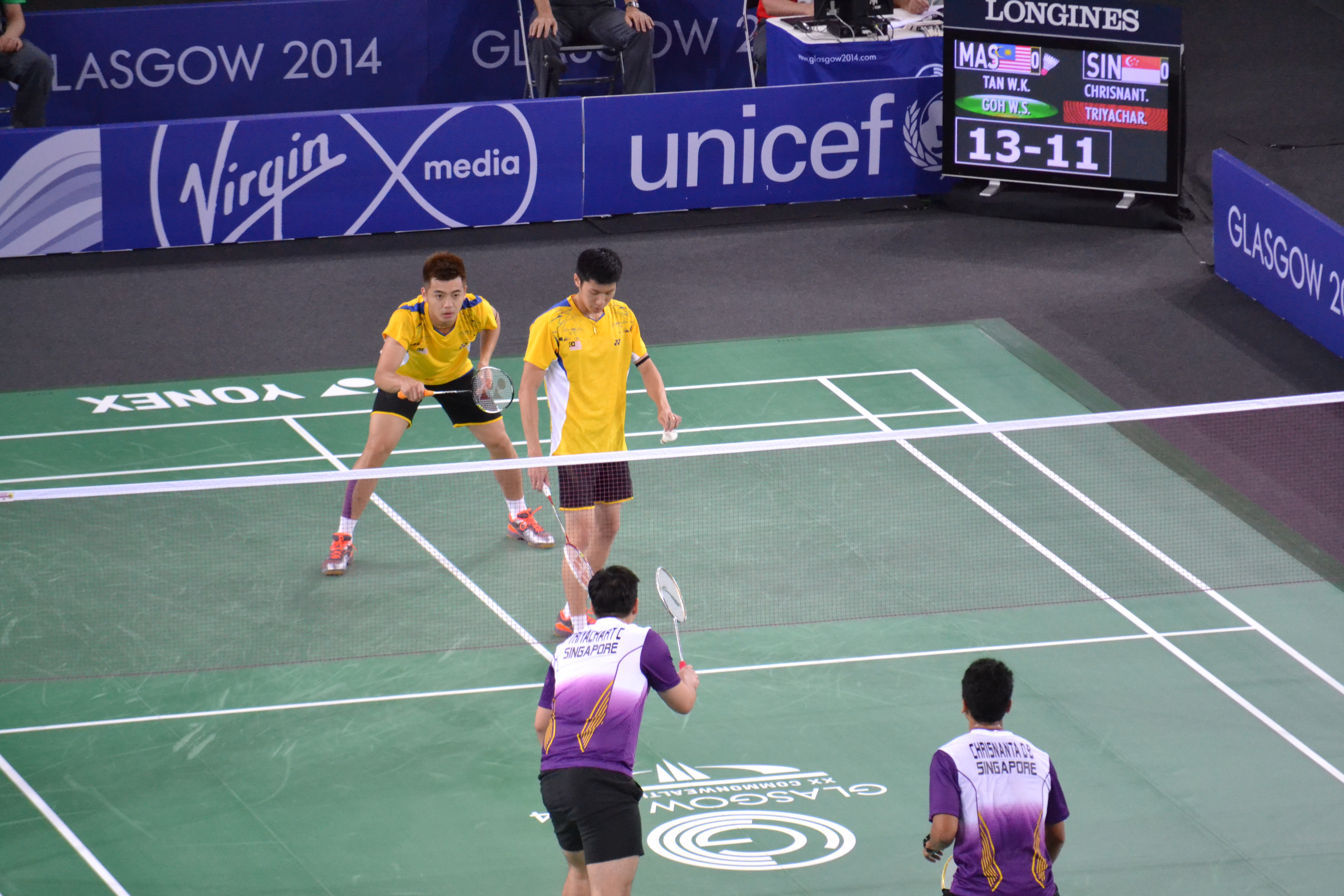
Badminton was held at the Commonwealth Arena and Sir Chris Hoy Velodrome

Archery and tennis from the 2010 games were replaced on the sports programme with triathlon (who turned back after the 2010 absence) and judo (after eight years absence). Among sport disciplines removed from 2010 include the walking events in athletics, synchronised swimming and Greco-Roman wrestling, while mountain biking also returned after the absence in Delhi. The number of Shooting medal events also dropped from 44 in 2010 to 19. Among new disciplines on the Commonwealth Games programme for the first time were the triathlon mixed relay event, more medal chances for women at shooting and the addition of women's boxing to the programme.

Numbers in parentheses indicate the number of medal events contested in each sport.

- Aquatics
  - Diving (10)
  - Swimming (44)
- Athletics (50)
- Badminton (6)
- Boxing (13)
- Cycling
  - Mountain biking (2)
  - Road (4)
  - Track (17)
- Gymnastics
  - Artistic gymnastics (14)
  - Rhythmic gymnastics (6)
- Field hockey (Hockey)
- Judo (14)
- Lawn bowls (10)
- Netball (1)
- Rugby sevens (1)
- Shooting (19)
- Squash (5)
- Table tennis (7)
- Triathlon (3)
- Weightlifting (19)
- Wrestling
  - Freestyle (14)

=== Medal table ===
Only the top ten successful nations are displayed here. The ranking in this table is consistent with International Olympic Committee convention in its published medal tables. By default, the table is ordered by the number of gold medals the athletes from a nation have won (in this context, a "nation" is an entity represented by a Commonwealth Games Association). The number of silver medals is taken into consideration next and then the number of bronze medals. If nations are still tied, equal ranking is given and they are listed alphabetically by their three-letter country code.

Two bronze medals were awarded in boxing, judo and wrestling, except for Women's freestyle 75 kg as only five competitors were entered in the event. Additionally, two bronze medals were awarded in the men's 100 m backstroke and women's pole vault as a result of a tie between two athletes. No bronze medal was awarded in the men's synchronized 10 metre platform as only four teams competed in the event. Therefore, the total number of bronze medals is greater than the total number of gold or silver medals.

* Host nation (Scotland)

2014 Commonwealth Games medal table
Rank	CGA	Gold	Silver	Bronze	Total
1	England	58	59	57	174
2	Australia	49	42	46	137
3	Canada	32	16	34	82
4	Scotland*	19	15	19	53
5	India	15	30	19	64
6	New Zealand	14	14	17	45
7	South Africa	13	10	17	40
8	Nigeria	11	11	14	36
9	Kenya	10	10	5	25
10	Jamaica	10	4	8	22
11–37	Remaining	30	50	66	146
Totals (37 entries)		261	261	302	824

=== Podium sweeps ===
Date	Sport	Event	Team	Gold	Silver	Bronze
24 July	Swimming	Men's 100 metre freestyle S9	Australia	Rowan Crothers	Matthew Cowdrey	Brenden Hall
27 July	Swimming	Men's 100 metre freestyle	Australia	James Magnussen	Cameron McEvoy	Tommaso D'Orsogna
28 July	Swimming	Women's 100 metre freestyle	Australia	Cate Campbell	Bronte Campbell	Emma McKeon
28 July	Squash	Men's singles	England	Nick Matthew	James Willstrop	Peter Barker
30 July	Gymnastics	Women's artistic individual all-around	England	Claudia Fragapane	Ruby Harrold	Hannah Whelan
31 July	Athletics	Men's 200 metres	Jamaica	Rasheed Dwyer	Warren Weir	Jason Livermore
2 August	Table tennis	Women's singles	Singapore	Feng Tianwei	Yu Mengyu	Lin Ye
2 August	Table tennis	Mixed doubles	England	Paul Drinkhall; Joanna Drinkhall	Liam Pitchford; Tin-Tin Ho	Daniel Reed; Kelly Sibley

== Broadcasting ==
Sunset + Vine Global Television Host Broadcasting Limited (SVGTV), a joint venture between Sunset + Vine, subsidiary of Tinopolis, a Wales-based television production group and Australia-based television production company, Global Television served as the host broadcaster of the Games.

== Marketing ==
=== Bid and interim logo ===
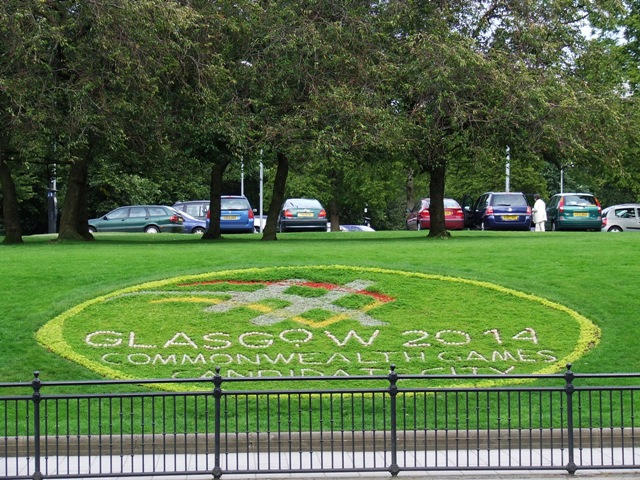
Glasgow 2014 flower bed in the grounds of Kelvingrove Art Gallery and Museum, promoting Glasgow's bid to host the 2014 Commonwealth Games.

The interim logo for the Games was first used during Glasgow's bid, with the "Candidate City" section removed following 9 November 2007, when the bid was approved. The logo depicts two sprinters woven into a tartan motif, representing Scotland. The logo also vaguely resembles the Clyde Auditorium, one of Glasgow's most recognisable landmarks. The pattern, forming the Roman numerals XX, also represents the 20th edition of the Commonwealth Games. The text is more specifically Glaswegian, with its stylised Mackintosh font. A flag featuring the logo was used extensively during the bid process. The flag was flown above Merchant House in George Square daily.

=== Sponsors ===
Sponsors of the 2014 Commonwealth Games
Official Partners
- BP
- Emirates
- Ford Motor Company
- Longines
- SSE plc
- Virgin Media
Official Games Supporters
- A.G. Barr
- Aggreko
- Atos
- Cisco
- Dell
- Ernst & Young
- FirstGroup
- First ScotRail
- Harper Macleod
- NVT Group
- Selex ES
- Search
- Toshiba
Official Games Providers
- Arena Group
- Arnold Clark Automobiles
- Bauer Media Group
- Boston Networks
- DB Schenker
- Gatorade
- Genius Gluten Free
- GL events (Field & Lawn)
- Gymnova
- Heineken
- Icon Health & Fitness
- John Lewis Partnership
- Kellogg's
- Leiths Group
- Malcolm Group
- Mondo
- Rapiscan Systems
- RGS
- Riedel Communications
- Speedo
- Sports Technnology
- Technogym
- The Famous Grouse
- Ticketmaster
- Toshiba
- Trespass
- Yonex

=== The Games brand identity ===
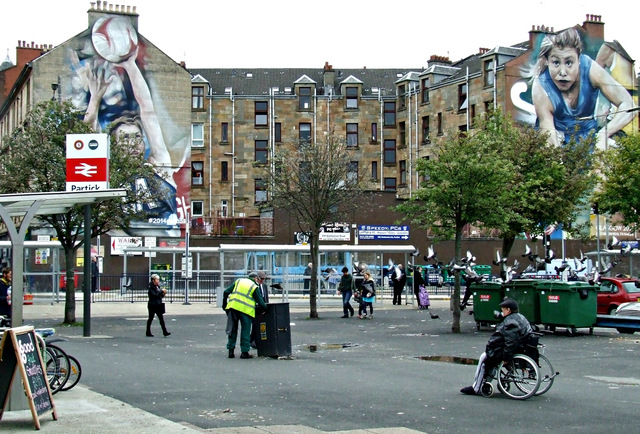
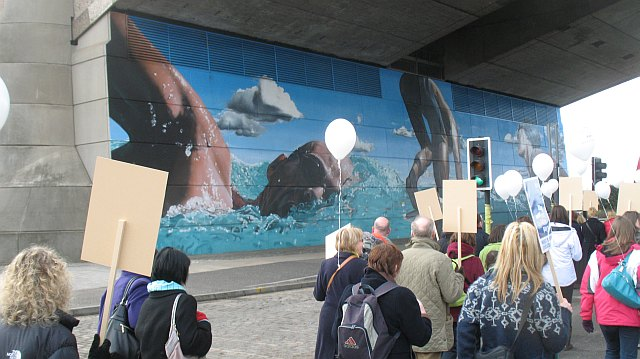
Murals painted in the buildings of Glasgow

The full Games brand identity was developed by Glasgow design studio Tangent Graphic, the lead creative agency between 2010 and 2014. Tangent's first major project was the official sport Pictograms, launched on 23 July 2011, and they continued to deliver and influence every aspect of the Glasgow 2014 identity. Tangent inherited the official logo which was designed by Marque Creative. The logo was unveiled on Commonwealth Day, 8 March 2010. It was inspired by three factors, time, data and measurement. Its rings are proportioned to represent the 20th Commonwealth Games, across 17 sports, over 11 days in 1 city. An animated version of the logo has also been produced.

There is also a version of the logo in Scottish Gaelic. Arthur Cormack, the Chair of Bòrd na Gàidhlig, made the following official statement:

Bòrd na Gàidhlig welcomes the Gaelic version of the logo for the Glaschu 2014 Commonwealth Games and we have been happy to work with the Glaschu 2014 team in helping them develop their identity. Given the unique importance of Gaelic to Scotland and the many Scots in the diaspora throughout the Commonwealth, we believe it should be seen, heard and spoken as widely as possible.

Given the worldwide interest there will be in the Games when they take place in Glasgow, a city with a large number of Gaelic speakers, we believe they offer an exciting opportunity for Gaelic to be seen and, we hope, heard and appreciated in an international setting. We hope this is just the start; we wish the Games well and look forward to working further with Glaschu 2014 to enhance the status of Gaelic within this hugely significant event.

The official website was built in phases, delivered by Dog Digital and Blonde. The Scottish art firm Artpistol were commissioned by the Glasgow 2014 Organising Committee to paint a series of murals across Glasgow to help celebrate and promote the Games.

==== The Big G ====
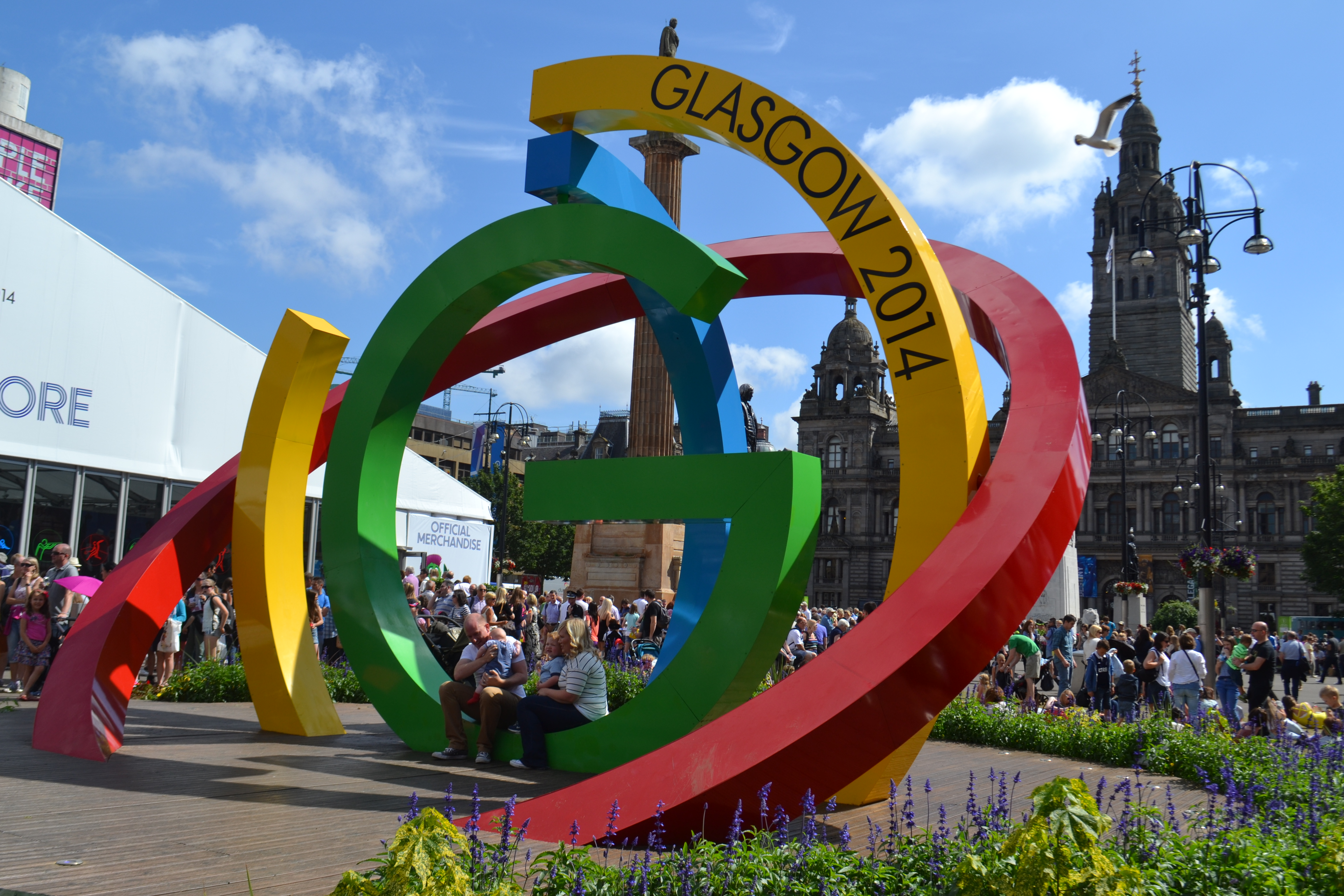
The 'Big G' was set up two months before the Games in George Square

The Big G is a standalone stage-set that was situated in George Square, Glasgow. It was unveiled in May 2014; with Glasgow City Council leader Gordon Matheson commenting that it provided an "opportunity for everyone – residents, visitors and spectators – to be part of the Games". British designing firm Evolve designed the Big G.

=== Mascot ===
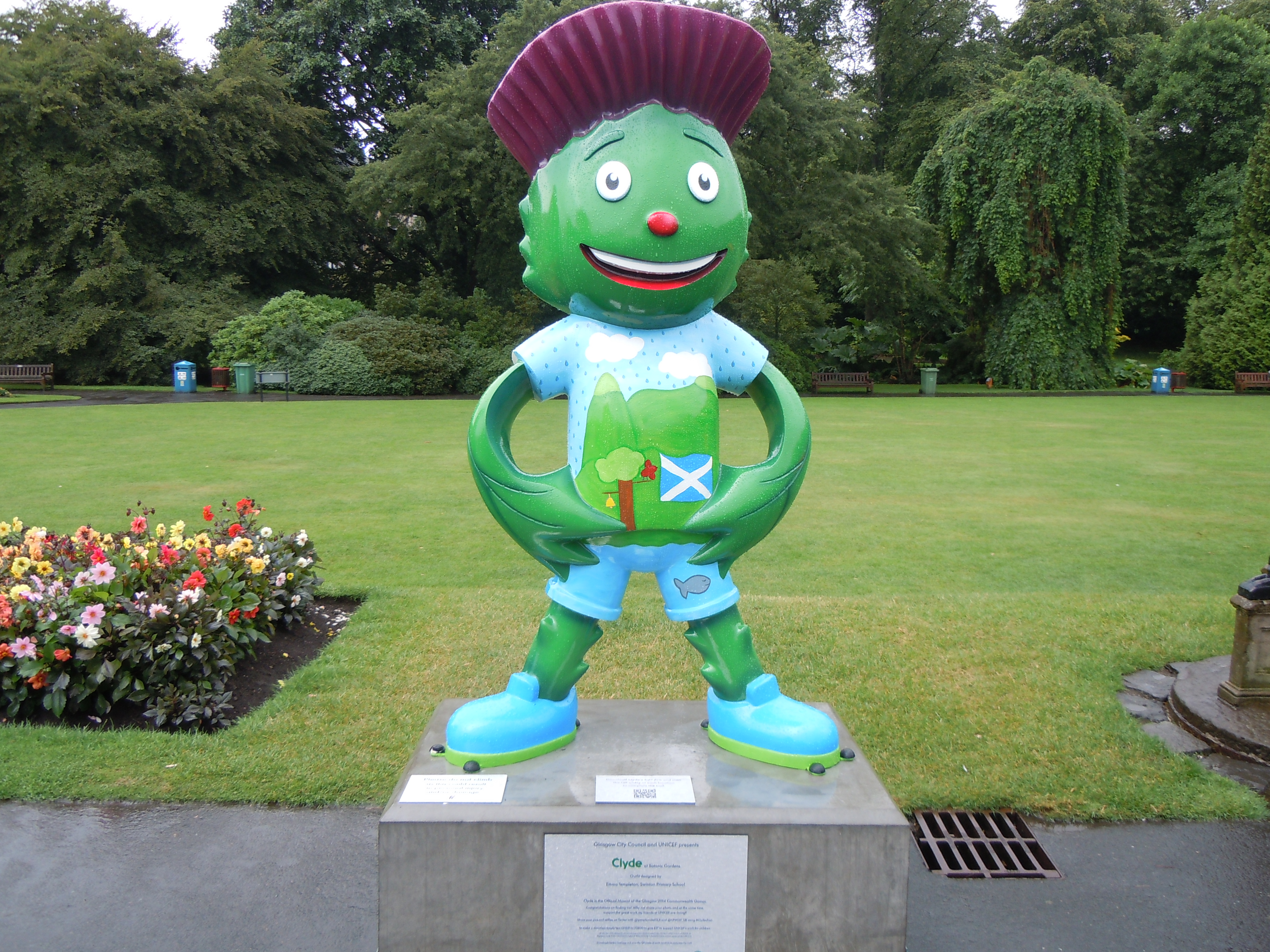
Mascot sculpture in the Glasgow Botanic Gardens

Clyde, an anthropomorphic thistle named after the river which flows through the centre of Glasgow, was the official mascot of the 2014 Commonwealth Games. The mascot was designed by Beth Gilmour, who won a competition run by Glasgow 2014 for children to design the Mascot. Beth's drawing was then brought to life by digital agency Nerv, who turned it into a commercial character, created a full backstory, gave it a name – Clyde – and created a website for him. Clyde was finally revealed in a seven-minute animated film created by Nerv at a ceremony at BBC Scotland's headquarters in Glasgow. The organiser, Glasgow 2014, said the mascot's design was chosen because of its "Scottish symbolism and Glaswegian charm and likeability".

25 life-size Clyde statues were erected at places of public interest across the city including the Glasgow Botanic Gardens, the Kelvingrove Art Gallery and at George Square. However following vandalism at a statue in the Govan area of the city, the statues were taken down. They are expected to be re-erected in secure areas. By the final day of the Games, over 50,000 Clyde mascot cuddly toys had been sold.

Due to popularity in the city, the Clyde mascots are currently proposed official mascots of the Glasgow City Council.

== Controversies ==
=== Drug doping and testing ===
Nigeria's Chika Amalaha failed a doping test and was stripped of a gold medal in the women's 53 kg weightlifting. In the women's 400 metres final, Botswana's Amantle Montsho placed fourth; she was subsequently provisionally suspended pending the results of a B sample after failing a doping test. Montsho's B sample was reported as positive on 14 August 2014.

== See also ==
- Commonwealth Games hosted by Scotland
  - 1970 British Commonwealth Games – Edinburgh
  - 1986 Commonwealth Games – Edinburgh
  - 2026 Commonwealth Games – Glasgow
- Commonwealth Youth Games hosted by Scotland
  - 2000 Commonwealth Youth Games – Edinburgh
- Commonwealth Games hosted by England
  - 1934 British Empire Games – London
  - 2002 Commonwealth Games – Manchester
  - 2022 Commonwealth Games – Birmingham
- Commonwealth Games hosted by Wales
  - 1958 British Empire and Commonwealth Games – Cardiff
- Olympic Games hosted by Great Britain
  - 1908 Summer Olympics – London
  - 1948 Summer Olympics – London
  - 2012 Summer Olympics – London
- Paralympic Games hosted by Great Britain
  - 1984 Summer Paralympics – Stoke Mandeville
  - 2012 Summer Paralympics – London
- Universiade hosted by Great Britain
  - 1991 Summer Universiade – Sheffield
- European Championships hosted by Great Britain
  - 2018 European Championships − Glasgow

Preceded by Delhi	Commonwealth Games; Glasgow; XX Commonwealth Games	Succeeded by Gold Coast
