= Schenker =

Schenker is the surname derived from the Middle High German and Middle Low German word Schenker from the verb schenken, 'to give', 'to serve (a drink)', and thus having the meanings of innkeeper or cupbearer. It may also be derived from this word used as a nickname meaning "drinker".

- Alexander M. Schenker (1924–2019), Polish-American Slavist
- Friedrich Schenker (1942–2013), German avant-garde composer and trombone player
- Gottfried Schenker (1842–1901), founder of Schenker AG
- H. R. Schenker (1882–1922), American football coach
- Heinrich Schenker (1868–1935), Austrian music theorist
- Michael Schenker (born 1955), German guitarist, founding member of the band Scorpions and member of the band UFO
- Niklas Schenker (born 1993), German political scientist and politician
- Rudolf Schenker (born 1948), German guitarist, founding member of the band Scorpions
- Uwe Schwenker (born 1959), German handball player
- Zoltán Ozoray Schenker (1880–1966), Hungarian Olympic champion saber fencer

== See also ==
- Schenker AG, German logistics company
- DB Schenker, division of German rail operator Deutsche Bahn
