= PTV Group =

German company

PTV Planung Transport Verkehr GmbH
- Company type: Gesellschaft mit beschränkter Haftung
- Industry: Computer software
- Founded: Karlsruhe, Germany (1979)
- Headquarters: Karlsruhe, Germany
- Key people: Andy Myers (CEO Umovity), Nick Ghia (CEO Umovity Software by PTV)
- Products: PTV Visum, PTV Vissim, PTV Optima, PTV Vistro, PTV Viswalk,
- Revenue: €116 million (PTV Group)
- Number of employees: approximately 670 worldwide (PTV Group)
- Website: Official website

PTV Planung Transport Verkehr GmbH is a German company specializing in software and consulting services for traffic and transportation and mobility. Their transport planning software, Vision Traffic Suite comprise the PTV Group's product portfolio. According to the manufacturer; over 2,500 customers in more than 120 countries use the Vision Traffic Suite in the fields of transport modelling and traffic flow calculation. PTV ranks among the top 1,000 global market leaders in Germany according to Germany's Manager Magazine.

The German company PTV Planung Transport Verkehr GmbH is a member of PTV Group.

== History ==
In 1979 Dr.-Ing. Hans Hubschneider and Michael Sahling founded PTV Planungsbüro Transport and Verkehr GmbH in Karlsruhe, Germany.

Between 1979 and 1982 they developed the first computer program for trip planning. The first projects included location and distribution planning for Raiffeisen in Schleswig-Holstein, line network planning for bus and road transport in Mannheim and trip planning for Langnese-Iglo. These projects were the basis for the development of other software products.

In 1999, PTV's five GmbH units were merged into PTV Planung Transport Verkehrs AG.

Since 2001, the company has been providing software products and services in the fields of transport, mobility, and logistics. In October 2007, the joint-stock company was awarded the negative Big Brother Award in the “Technology” category “for its system for the individual calculation of car insurance” with the pay-as-you-drive system because it “records the route and driving behavior and sent to the insurance company". The following year, PTV accepted the award.

In 2012, PTV launched a new corporate design and a new logo.

In 2016 PTV Group has acquired 100% of the British company Distributed Planning Software Limited (DPS).

In June 2017, the Porsche Automobil Holding SE (Porsche SE) announced the acquisition of PTV, for a purchase price in excess of 300 million euro. The international Private Equity Investor Bridgepoint acquired a majority stake in PTV in October 2021. Porsche Automobil Holding SE retains a 40 percent stake in the company.

In February 2022 PTV Planung Transport Verkehr AG changed its legal form to a limited liability company and now operates under the name PTV Planung Transport Verkehr GmbH.

In March 2022 PTV joined forces with the North American provider of intelligent traffic management solutions Econolite

In January 2023, the company, together with investors Bridgepoint and Porsche SE, announced a strategic realignment with the separation of the mobility and logistics businesses into two independent companies.

Since August 2023, the Logistics division has been spun off as PTV Logistics GmbH

== Projects ==
PTV is involved in the development of systems for traffic management, traffic information and forecasts. This includes, for example, the European transport model, which encompasses all passenger transport and freight movements in Europe, and is developed using PTV software, as well as traveler information services on the BayernInfo.de website of the German state of Bavaria.

Since 2008, PTV supports "DAS FEST", an open-air festival in Karlsruhe, by simulating pedestrian escape routes. The information film was based on the software module PTV Vissim which allows the user to model and visualise the interaction between people at major events and between people and vehicles. Another application simulated the transfer behaviour of passengers at the North Melbourne Station in Australia.

== Research ==
A new routing method for urban transport has been developed by PTV as part of the CVIS project which is funded by the European Commission. Route recommendations provided by cities and communities can also be included in this strategic routing method, which was presented to the public with live driving demonstrations in November 2009.

PTV is consortium partner of the research project for urban and autonomous freight logistics, efeuCampus in Bruchsal, funded by the European Union and the state Baden-Württemberg. PTV is responsible for the transport processes on the site and the route planning of the autonomous vehicles within the general conditions.
