= EfeuCampus =

Urban logistics campus)

EfeuCampus (eco-friendly experimental urban logistics campus) based in Bruchsal, is Germany's first research area for urban, autonomous and emission free freight logistics on the last mile ("LastMileCityLab"). The Living lab is funded by the European Union and the state Baden-Württemberg.In addition, the campus develops solutions for smart mobility in urban areas throughout Europe. In addition to autonomous delivery robots, an emission-free cargo drone from Volocopter will also supply the campus with goods in the future.

== History ==
The beginnings of the project date back to 2015, when the Regionale Wirtschaftsförderung Bruchsal GmbH and the Technologieregion Karlsruhe GbR won the competition for sustainable regional development ("RegioWIN") of the state of Baden-Württemberg and awarded EfeuCampus concept as a european lighthouse project in the field of innovation centers. The project was awarded a total of 10 million euros in the first funding period (2014-2020), which came from the European Regional Development Fund (EFRE) and the state of Baden Württemberg. In 2016, EfeuCampus Bruchsal GmbH was founded by the city of Bruchsal as a wholly owned subsidiary.

== Concept ==
The efeuCampus project has been developed on the site of the former Dragoon Barracks ("efeuQuartier"). It is an impetus for the development of solutions for last-mile freight logistics and autonomous vehicle technology. The efeuQuartier consists of the efeuCampus with the efeuLog delivery system, where the operation of automatic delivery and automatic collection of parcels as well as the disposal of recyclable materials takes place. A depot serves as intermediate storage for incoming and outgoing goods. Autonomous transport robots deliver the goods to the neighbourhood depot in front of the residents' houses. Communication with the delivery robots takes place via an app. Pick-up points placed in front of the houses guarantee a smooth process.

== Partner ==
- big. bechtold-gruppe
- Bruchsal
- FZI Forschungszentrum Informatik
- PTV Planung Transport Verkehr
- Karlsruhe University of Applied Sciences
- Karlsruhe Institute of Technology (KIT)
- SEW Eurodrive
- Schenker AG
- Volocopter

== Supporter ==
- Europäische Union
- Ministerium für Wirtschaft, Arbeit und Wohnungsbau Baden-Württemberg
- Technologieregion Karlsruhe
- Test Area Autonomous Driving Baden-Württemberg

== Awards ==
- 2022, Innovation Award, Federal Ministry for Economic Affairs and Climate Action
