= Trespass (clothing) =

International sportswear brand

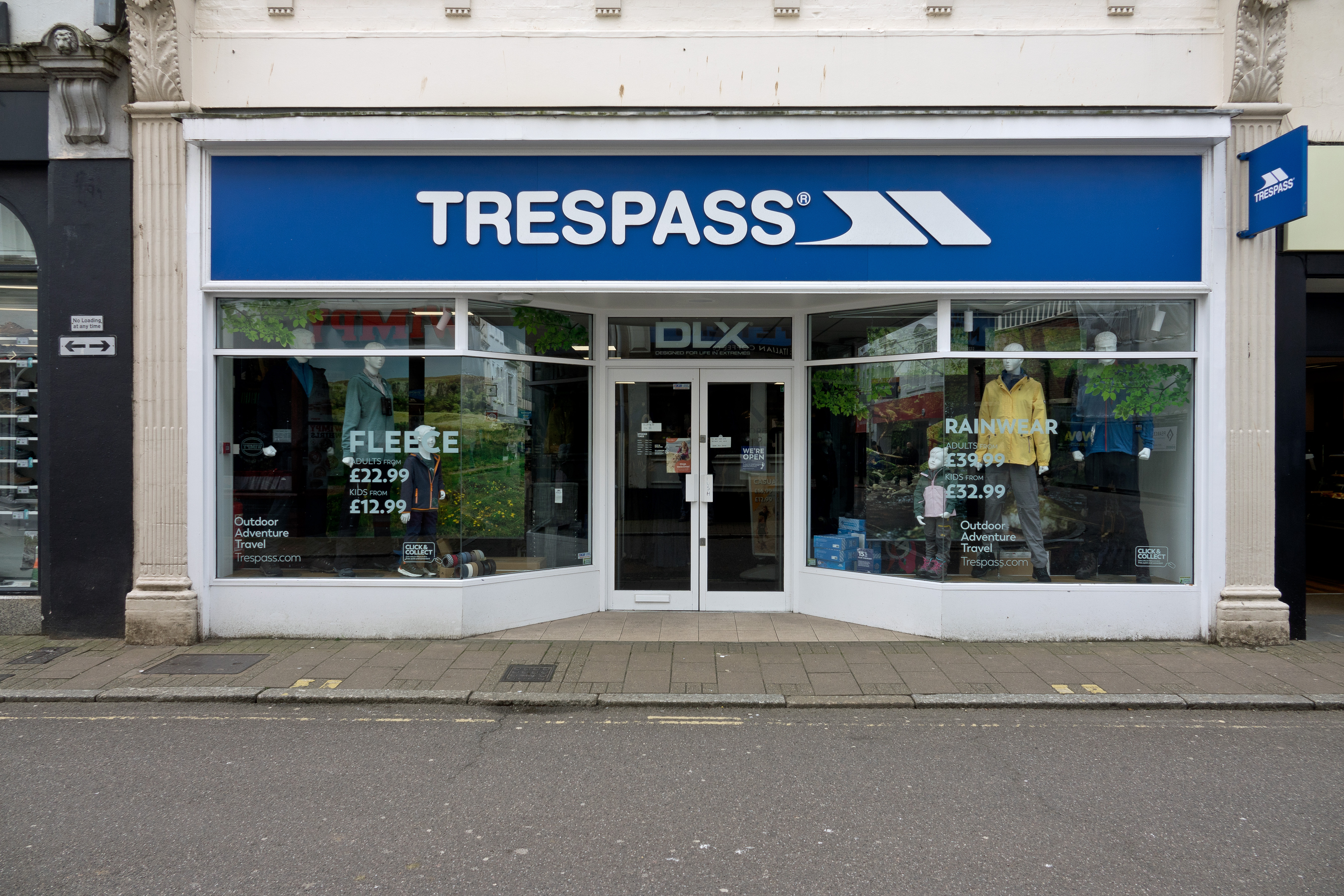
- Branch in Barnstaple, Devon
- Product type: Sports clothing
- Current owner: Jacobs & Turner Ltd
- Country: United Kingdom
- Introduced: 1984
- Website: UK - trespass.com Canada - trespass.ca Poland - trespass.pl

Trespass is a sportswear brand specialized in skiwear, waterproof jackets, fleeces, festival accessories, walking boots and camping gear. The company distributes its products in the wholesale market, through retail shops in Ireland, the UK and mainland Europe, and online.

== History ==
Jacobs & Turner Ltd. was established in 1938 and, at the time, specialised in technical workwear. The Trespass brand was created in 1984, moving the company towards specialising in performance skiwear and outdoor clothing.

Since its inception, the company has been located in Glasgow, Scotland, with its main head office and distribution centre still residing in the south side of the city.

== Stores ==
After moving into the retail trade in the 1990s, Trespass expanded its business within Great Britain. It expanded into the Republic of Ireland in 2008, mainland Europe in 2014, and Northern Ireland in 2015. Its 200th UK store was opened in 2018.

The company has over 300 shops in Ireland, Great Britain, the Netherlands, Poland, France, Germany, Austria, and Canada (with a store in Niagara, Ontario), and has operations in 62 countries worldwide. It also sells via its website.

== Partnership with Glasgow 2014 Commonwealth Games ==
In February 2013, it was announced that Trespass were the official uniform providers for the Glasgow 2014 Commonwealth Games. Trespass supplied the uniforms for the Queen's Baton Relay and the Games Workforce, estimated at 15,000 volunteers. On 18 August 2013, the Trespass designed uniforms were unveiled, alongside the relay baton.

== Trespass as Returning Sponsor for Glasgow 2026 ==
In August 2025, it was announced that Trespass has been appointed by Glasgow 2026 as the Official Uniform Partner and will design, produce, and supply the uniforms for the workforce and volunteers at the 2026 Commonwealth Games. Trespass becomes the first brand ever to kit out two editions of the Commonwealth Games, having previously supplied the uniforms for the Glasgow 2014 workforce and volunteers. The uniforms will be worn by thousands of team members and volunteers, showcasing Trespass’s technical materials and design.

== Sponsorship ==
Trespass sponsors a number of sporting events and athletes. These include:

- British Children's Ski Team
- The Ski and Snowboard Show
- British Universities & Colleges team (BUCS) at the World University Winter Games
