= Leiths Group =

- Industry: Construction
- Headquarters: Aberdeen, Scotland
- Subsidiaries: Leiths, Joss, Lawrie Demolition, Markon, A Ross & Sons

The Leiths Group is a group of construction-related companies based in Cove, Aberdeen, Scotland. The group includes the following companies:

- Leiths (Scotland) Ltd - provides quarry materials and precast concrete products from several Scottish locations
- Joss - The longest running suppliers of Sand & Gravel in the North-East of Scotland
- Lawrie Demolition – offers a range of demolition services from small domestic contracts to very large industrial and specialised projects.
- Markon - provides a range of services and products to the Highways and Civil Engineering sectors, from motorways to footpaths, airfields to car parks, Industrial, commercial or architectural.
- A Ross & Sons - offers a range of quarrying products such as single sized aggregates, general fill materials, sand and gravel, asphalt and concrete products and concrete blocks.

In 2003, Leiths (Scotland) acquired the demolition and asbestos-removal businesses of John Lawrie Group.

In 2004, the company announced plans to build a quarry on the site of the former Howard Doris oil yard at Kishorn.

In 2003, Leiths was among the first companies in the United Kingdom to order a Vogele 17t Super 1603-1 paver from Joseph Vögele AG, a subsidiary of Wirtgen Group.

In January 2011, Leiths sold off Big Ord Ltd to Grafton Group, who own Buildbase and PDM.
