= DB Schenker =

German logistics company

- Industry: Logistics company
- Predecessor: Berliner Paketfahrt- Speditions- und Lagerhaus (vormals Bartz & Co)
- Founded: 1872; 154 years ago
- Founder: Gottfried Schenker
- Headquarters: Germany
- Parent: DSV (2025–present)
- Website: dbschenker.com

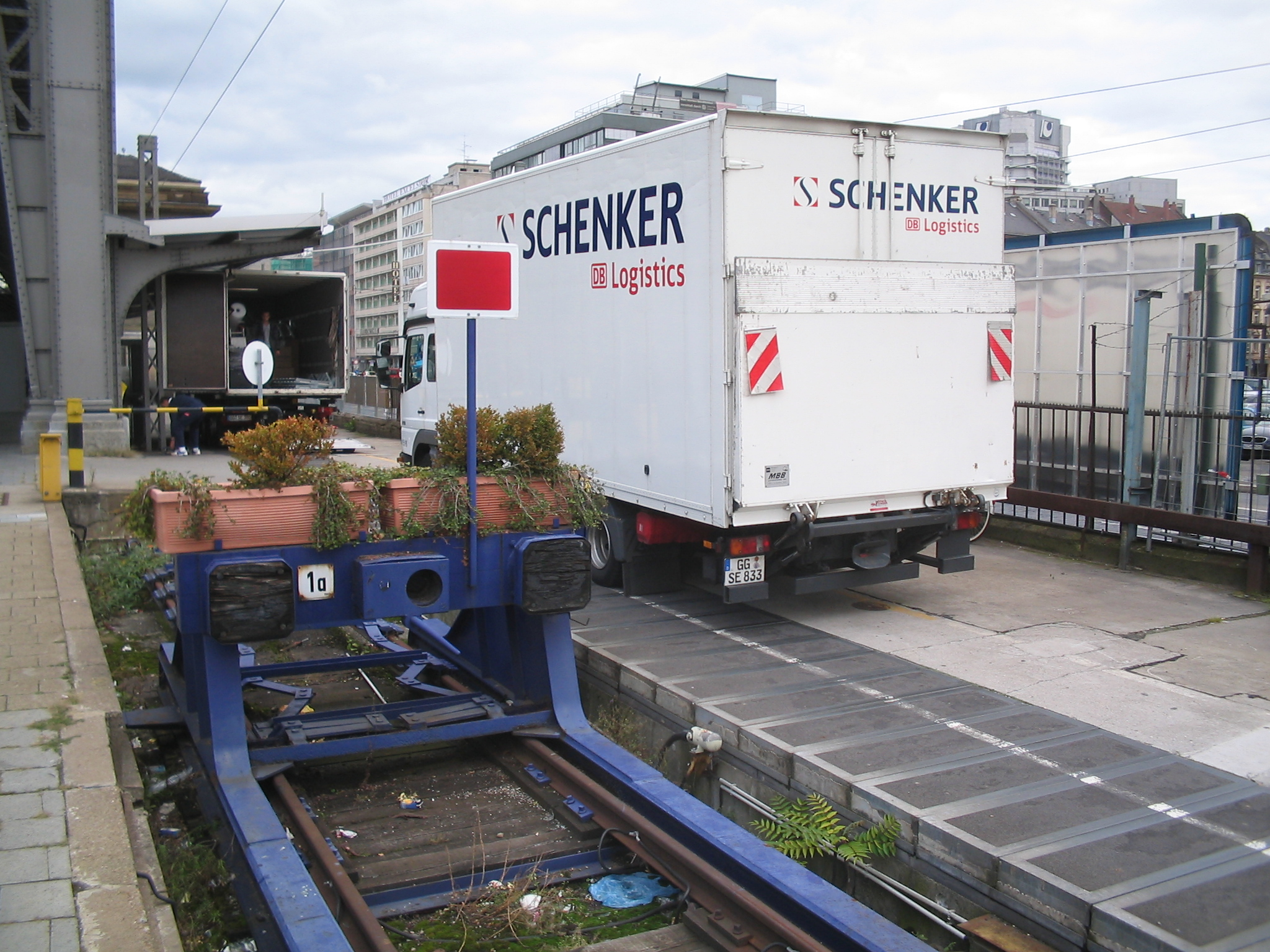
Schenker, the road, air, and sea forwarder, is a subsidiary of DSV.

Schenker AG, doing business as DB Schenker, is a German logistics company that serves local and global firms across various industries. Notably, it manages large and complex supply chains for multinationals such as Apple, Procter & Gamble, Dell, ASML, BMW.

Schenker comprises divisions for air, land, sea freight, and Contract Logistics. In 2025, a year after having revenues of €19 billion, it was reported that the firm had 71,000 employees in over 1,850 locations across 130 countries.

Before becoming a subsidiary of the logistics company DSV, it belonged to the rail operator Deutsche Bahn, which acquired it in 2002. In April 2025, DSV completed the purchase of Schenker for €14.3 billion.

== History ==
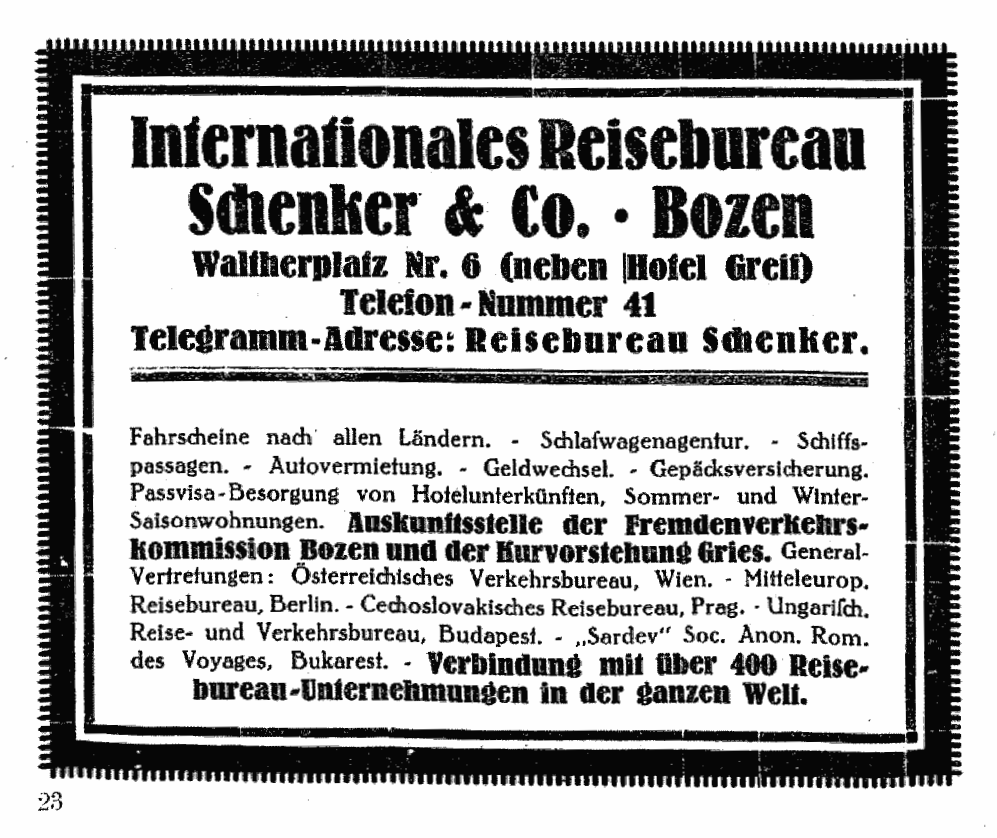
Advertisement for Schenker & Co (1925)

Gottfried Schenker founded Schenker & Co. in Vienna, Austria, in 1872.

In 1931, Schenker was acquired by the German Railways (Reichsbahn). After Hitler came to power in 1933, the Nazis placed Dr. Edmund Veesenmayer, on the board. During the Nazi era, the Schenker Company was "one of the most important enterprises engaged in pillage and plunder during German aggressions and mass crimes throughout Europe in the period from 1938 to 1945."

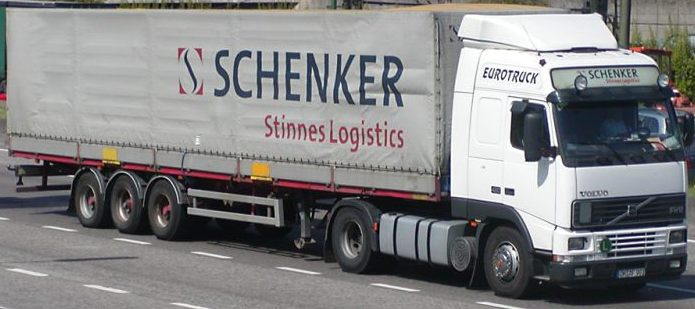
A Schenker truck, bearing the Stinnes Logistics logo

The Schenker papers, which recorded shipping via Schenker of Nazi looted art, were discovered by British Monuments Man Douglas Cooper and enabled researchers to track down some of the artworks stolen from Jews during the Holocaust.

Logo of Schenker when it was part of Stinnes AG

In 1991, Stinnes AG, a logistics group owned by VEBA (now E.ON), purchased Schenker from Deutsche Bahn. In 1997, Schenker underwent a significant restructuring, divested its bulk cargo business and purchased the Swedish company BTL-AB. In 2003, however, Schenker once again became a wholly owned subsidiary of Deutsche Bahn, when DB acquired Stinnes AG from E.ON.

=== Deutsche Bahn ownership, 2003–2025 ===
In his biography, then CEO of Deutsche Bahn Hartmut Mehdorn justified the acquisition of international logistics companies with customer demand. In 2000, analysis had shown the 200 largest customers shipped up to 60% of their freight abroad. Since the core operating territory had been Germany, customers were lost to competitors with a more compelling international offer. There was no time to grow organically in such markets. This analysis led to the acquisition of Stinnes AG and the associated brand name Schenker.

On 31 January 2006, DB Logistics acquired BAX Global for $1.1 billion. Following the acquisition and integration of BAX Global, Spain-Tir and S.C. Romtrans S.A., DB Schenker became a leading European logistics player and the main freight logistics subsidiary of Deutsche Bahn, combining all transport and logistic activities of Deutsche Bahn except rail cargo.

In 2010, DB Schenker opened a major new intermodal transport hub in Salzburg.

Since 2016, the UK operation has operated under the DB Cargo UK brand name. DB Schenker became the biggest freight operator in the United Kingdom, and also operates the British Royal Train used by the Royal Family.

In 2021, DB Schenker cooperated with logistics startup Volocopter to introduce heavy-lift drones.

In 2021, the company launched Schenker Ventures, its own venture capital arm to invest in innovation in the logistics industry. Schenker Ventures announced its first investment in German logistics startup Warehousing1.

In November 2021, DB Schenker announced a partnership with Swedish electric commercial vehicle manufacturer Volta Trucks after having signed a pre-order of 1,500 Volta Zero vehicles.

=== DSV ownership, 2025–present ===
By 2022, DB Schenker accounted for more than a third of Deutsche Bahn's sales. In December, the supervisory board of Deutsche Bahn instructed the company's management to prepare for the possible sale of up to 100% of DB Schenker.

In December 2023, Deutsche Bahn eventually launched the sales process. By early 2024, at least seven companies had made non-binding offers for DB Schenker. In September 2024, DSV agreed terms to purchase DB Schenker for €14.3 billion.

In April 2025, DSV got the final approvals for the acquisitions. The acquisition was finalized April 30, 2025.

== Special tasks ==
- Schenker was the official carrier of the 1972 Summer Olympics in Munich, 2000 in Sydney and 2002 in Salt Lake City.
- Schenker supports the United Buddy Bears exhibitions worldwide. A particular challenge was the realization of the exhibition in Pyongyang (North Korea), 2009.
- At the EfeuCampus in Bruchsal Schenker is testing with partners such as Volocopter, KIT or SEW Eurodrive on emission free and autonomous for urban freight logistics. The living lab is funded by the European Union and the state Baden-Württemberg.

== Controversies ==
- In September 2015, then and current CEO Jochen Thewes slapped and pushed a cab driver, who refused to pick up a drunken Thewes, in downtown Singapore. He also kicked the car and caused damage. Thewes was eventually sentenced to a fine of S$1000 and two weeks of jailtime in Singapore.
- In 2016, DB Schenker was convicted for consecutive cases of corruption in St Petersburg, Russia, bribing local customs officials from 2010 to mid-2012. At the time, DB Schenker involved a Russian agency for enabling the rapid flow of shipments to carmaker Ford's St Petersburg facility. DB Schenker had to pay a penalty of €2m.
- In 2020, DB Schenker was accused of unfair price dumping during the COVID-19 pandemic and related market turbulences. Allegedly, it was using its status as a state-owned company (as subsidiary of Deutsche Bahn) to request prices from subcontractors below their production costs for some European land routes via the freight exchange Timocom. The company rejected the allegations, pointing out that it has no insights in pricing strategies and production costs of subcontractors. However, it announced it would temporarily refrain from using fixed prices for transports published via freight exchanges.

== See also ==
- Deutsche Bahn
- Gottfried Schenker
