= Gottfried Schenker =

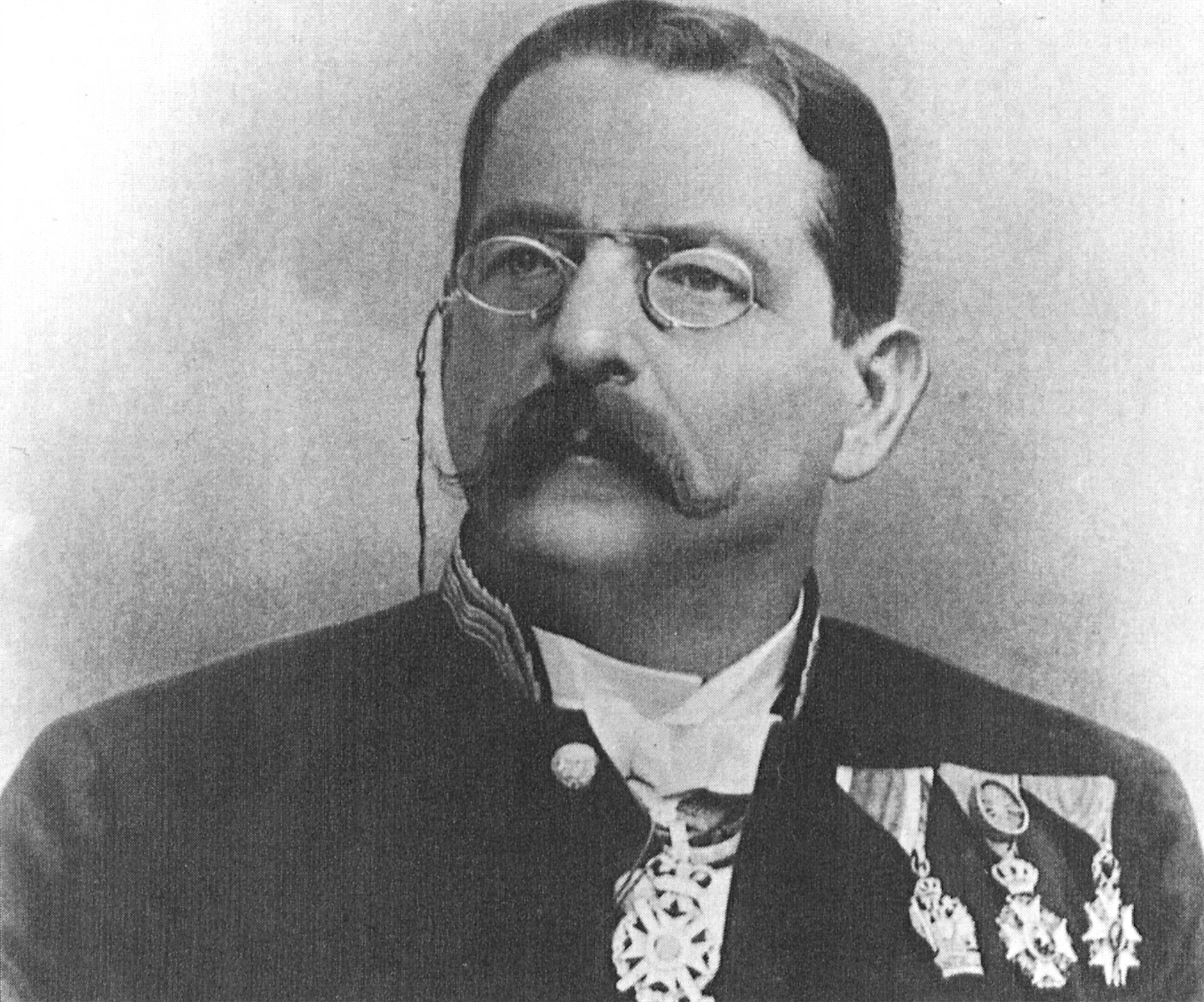

Gottfried Schenker (14 February 1842 in Däniken, Canton of Solothurn, Switzerland – 26 November 1901 in Vienna) was the founder of Schenker AG.

== Vienna ==
At the age of 30, Schenker together with two partners founded the freight forwarding company Schenker & Co on 1 July 1872 in Vienna. The managerial ingenuity of the Swiss-born entrepreneur was the introduction of groupage consignments by train. The idea to consolidate small shipments into larger units led to a completely new, reasonably priced and fast transport system by rail, road, sea, and inland waterways. The network of branches was expanding rapidly. At the end of the 19th century, Schenker already was the only enterprise offering tariffs calculated through from London to Istanbul. His successful approach—"house to house transport with one single forwarder"—soon made him market leader, as he was able to meet the requirements of his customers better and faster than all the competitors. The company has maintained this approach until today. A present-day historian wrote about Gottfried Schenker, who died in 1901, "He was one of the great economic pioneers of the 19th century and became renowned far outside the borders of the Austro-Hungarian empire".

== Expansion ==
At the turn of the century, Vienna was a metropolis in a country at the heart of Europe, where ten languages were being used actively. Starting from Vienna, the company opened up markets within and without the Austro-Hungarian monarchy. In rapid succession, Gottfried Schenker founded branches in Budapest, Trieste, Prague, Belgrade, Sofia, Salonika, and Constantinople. At that time, the distribution within the cities and individual regions was still carried out by horse-drawn coaches. Impressive warehouses, like the one in Vienna, acted as trade hubs. Consignments for longer distances were transported by rail. However, groupage transports across the entire continent or the transport of bulk cargo also required transport by sea. Anticipating further developments, Gottfried Schenker acquired interests in shipping lines. Starting from Trieste, he organized transports across the Mediterranean Sea, to Belgium, the Netherlands, Germany, and the UK, as well as to the United States. The company's ships with his own name, "Gottfried Schenker" and that of his wife, "Betty", were crossing the Atlantic Ocean.

== Telegraphy ==
In 1913 the first branch office outside Europe was founded in New York. At the same time the company also consistently exploited the possibilities modern technology was offering, by combining forwarding with the emerging methods of telecommunications. Just when the new transport routes to America were being opened up, the company acquired interests in well known telegraph companies which, for the first time, connected Europe and America by communication cables. Gottfried Schenker created the foundation for a future-oriented network of transport means, the utilization of information technology and the company's global presence. For 136 years Schenker's success has been based on these principles.

== See also ==
- DB Schenker
- Schenker AG
