= SEW Eurodrive =

German manufacturing company

SEW-EURODRIVE
- Type: GmbH & Co. KG
- Industry: Drive automation
- Founded: June 13, 1931
- Headquarters: Bruchsal, Germany
- Area served: Worldwide
- Key people: Juergen Blickle
- Number of employees: 17,000

SEW-EURODRIVE GmbH & Co. KG is a German manufacturing company located in Bruchsal, Germany.

The company produces gear units, motors, electric motors, and inverter technology.

== The beginnings under Ernst Blickle ==
The company started with the designer Albert Obermoser. His geared motor, designed in 1928, revolutionized drive technology. Christian Pähr, a trained banker, recognized the enormous potential of that drive design and acquired the rights to the geared motor from the bankrupt estate of Obermoser AG. Despite economic and political turmoil, he founded the company "Süddeutsche-Elektromotoren-Werke" in 1931, known since 1971 as SEW-EURODRIVE. Christian Pähr died in 1935. His wife Kunigunde Pähr took over the company with the support of their daughter Edeltraut Pähr. In 1945, Ernst Wilhelm Blickle, Christian Pähr's son-in-law, took over as managing director of the company.

SEW produced motors until 1945, when the Allied Strategic Command bombed Bruchsal into rubble. After Germany's surrender, the company became an entity of the US via the Marshall Plan. In 1948, the company was returned to its owners, the Blickles. Due to increasing production demands following the economic growth after the war, Ernst Blickle laid the cornerstone for a 10,000-square-meter manufacturing facility in Graben, ten kilometers away. In the wake of a plant expansion at a later time, Ernst Blickle also had social rooms constructed for his employees and training workshops.

In 1965, SEW-EURODRIVE presented its innovative modular system for gearmotors. The customized production is organized centrally in a small number of plants with high volumes while assembly is performed as close as possible to the customer. This ensures a greater degree of customization with short delivery times. After the death of Ernst Blickle in 1987, his sons Rainer and Jürgen Blickle took over as managing partners of SEW-EURODRIVE.

== International expansion ==
In 1960, SEW-EURODRIVE opened its first foreign subsidiary—SEW-USOCOME—in Haguenau, Alsace. Between 1968 and 1969, the company began expanding by opening assembly plants in Sweden, Italy, and England.

In 1974, the first employees started their work at SEW-EURODRIVE in Canada, which was the beginning of the American expansion of the company. In 1975 and 1978, the company continued on its course of international expansion by opening production and assembly plants in the US and Brazil.

In the 1980s, new sites in the metropolises Melbourne, Australia, and Johannesburg, South Africa, were established. Assembly plants in Japan and Singapore marked the beginning of the Asian expansion.

SEW-EURODRIVE has been present in Russia since 1993. With production and assembly sites constructed in 1994, the Asian expansion continued and SEW-EURODRIVE established itself on the Asian market. Following this expansion, a new branch opened in India in 1997.

== Key figures ==
More than 19,000 employees at over 430 sites worldwide generate sales of over €3 billion. SEW-EURODRIVE has 17 production and 85 assembly plants around the world called Drive Technology Centers. 23% of the employees are engineers and computer scientists.

== Product portfolio ==
- Gearmotors, gear units, and motors
- Electronically controlled drives (frequency inverters)
- Components for decentralized Installation
- Servo technology
- Large and industrial gear units
- Mechanical variable-speed drives
- Explosion-proof drives according to ATEX, IECEx or HazLoc-NA®
- Control technology
- Services
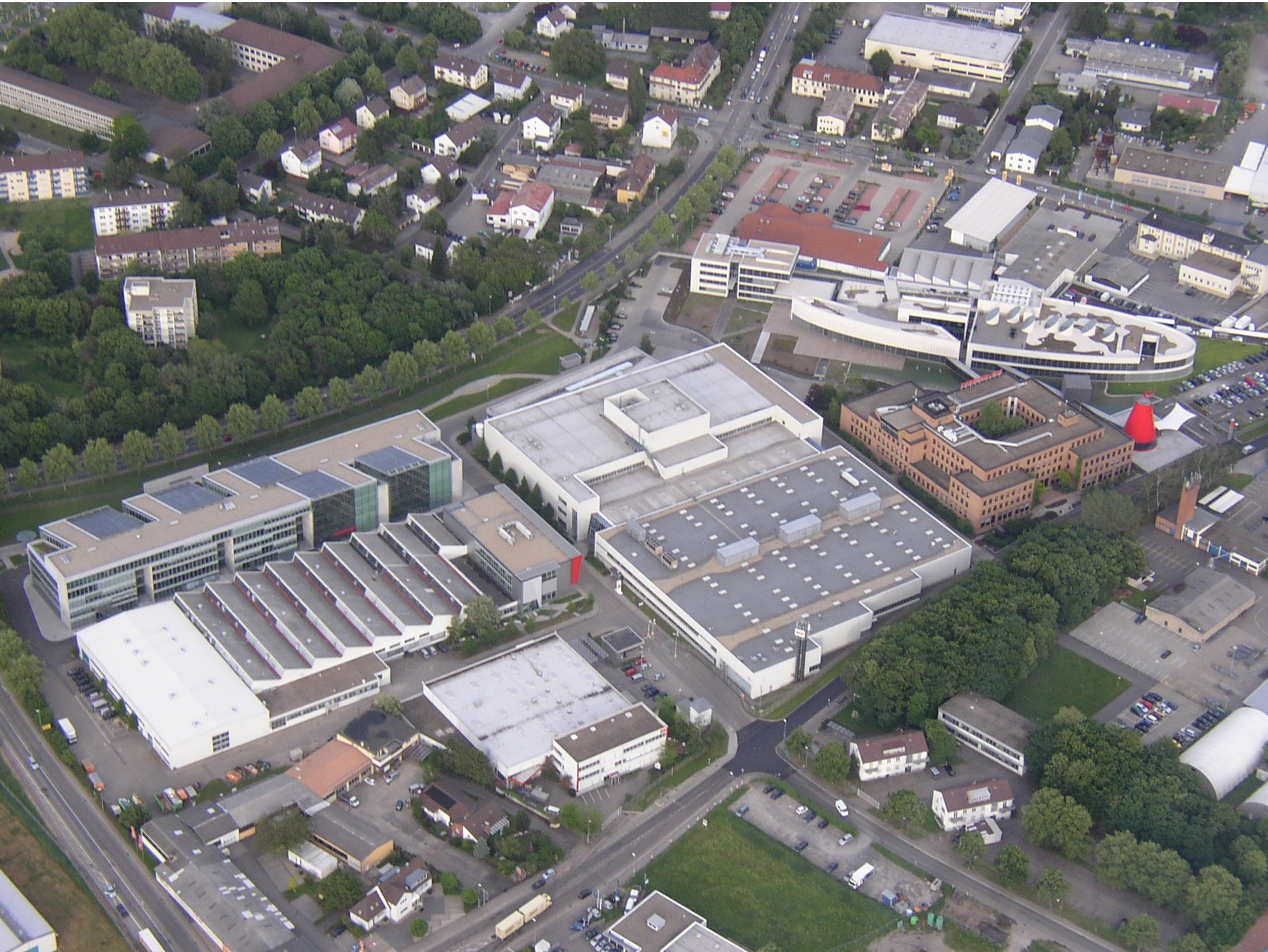
SEW-EURODRIVE headquarters in Bruchsal

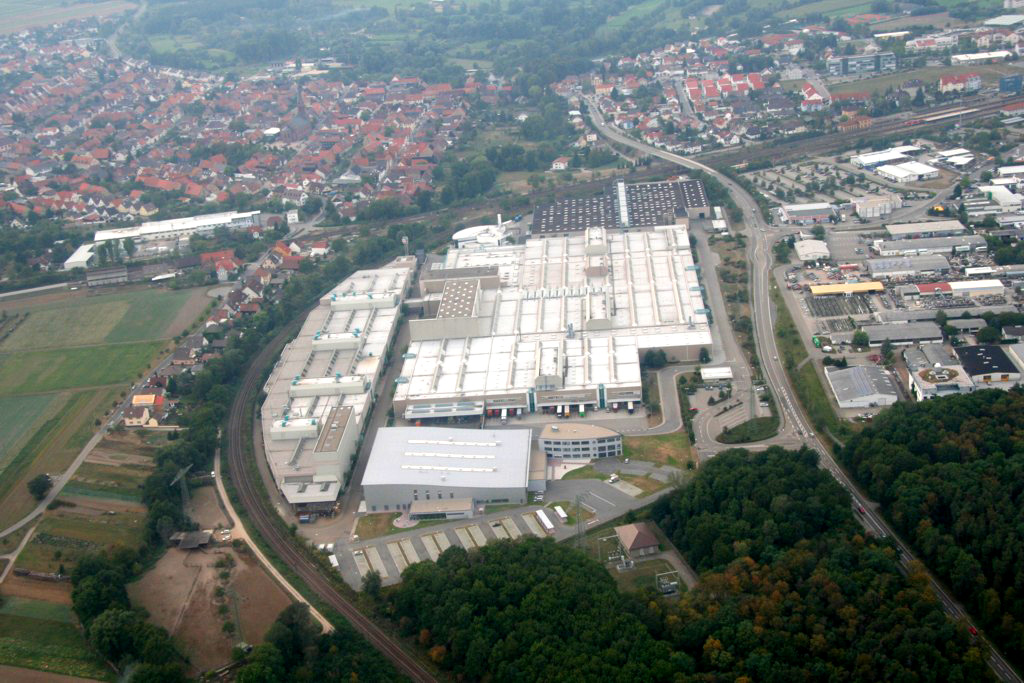
SEW-EURODRIVE subsidiary Graben-Neudorf

spur gear

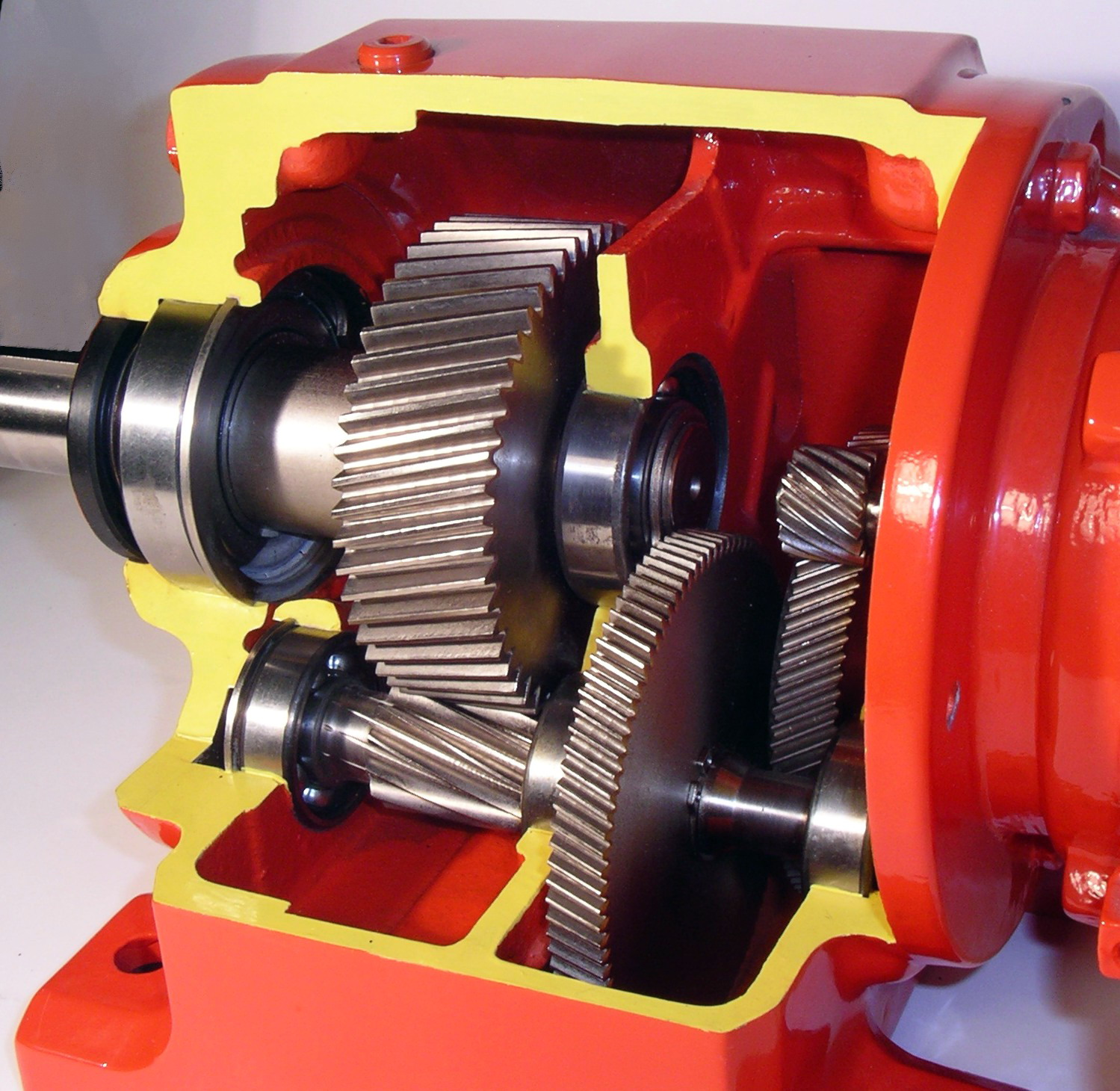
spur gear

== Research project efeuCampus ==
SEW is partner of the future project for urban and autonomous freight logistics, efeuCampus in Bruchsal, which is funded by the European Union and the state Baden-Württemberg. SEW is responsible for research and development of the autonomous delivery vehicles and the technical infrastructure. SEW is responsible for induction charging systems, the electrified vehicles, the development of a 5G infrastructure for communication, and the delivery of parcels and recyclables to and from the test area residents. The aim of the project is to transfer innovative solutions from the modern factory to the urban logistics.

== Foundations ==
=== SEW-EURODRIVE Foundation ===
In November 1989, Edeltraut Blickle established the SEW-EURODRIVE Foundation in memory of her husband Ernst Wilhelm Blickle. Ever since, the foundation has promoted scientific work and the further development of scientific knowledge in the areas of technology (basic and applied research) and business (management, corporate governance, and policy).

==== Prizes ====
The Ernst Blickle Prize, worth €100,000, has been awarded by the SEW-EURODRIVE Foundation since 1991. Today, it is presented every two years. Prize winners are selected by the board of trustees and a specially appointed committee according to the foundation charter. Previous prize winners:

- 1991 Manfred Depenbrock, Bochum (Germany)
- 1992 Hans Winter (†), Munich (Germany)
- 1993 Wolfgang Finke, Wachtberg-Ließem (Germany)
- 1994 Darle W. Dudley (†), San Diego (United States)
- 1995 Ferenc Anistis, Haidershofen (Austria)
- 1996 Manfred Rose, Heidelberg (Germany)
- 1997 Manfred Weck, Aachen (Germany)
- 1998 Jörg Hugel, Zürich (Switzerland)
- 1999 Georges Henriot, Gif-sur Yvette (France)
- 2000 Richard van Basshuysen, Bad Wimpfen (Germany)
- 2002 Joachim Milberg, Munich (Germany)
- 2004 Fred C. Lee (United States)
- 2006 Bernd-Robert Höhn, Munich (Germany)
- 2008 Gerd Hirzinger, Oberpfaffenhofen (Germany)
- 2010 Michael Rogowski, Stuttgart (Germany)
- 2012 Martin Kannegiesser, Poznań (Poland)
- 2014 Leo Lorenz
- 2016 Martin A. Kapp

=== Edeltraudt-Blickle-Stiftung ===
In September 1992, Rainer Blickle established the Edeltraut Blickle Foundation. The foundation pursues charitable purposes only. The foundation supports medical research establishments, hospitals, and other institutes in the area of health care and people in need of social and medical care.
