= Table tennis at the 2014 Commonwealth Games – Mixed doubles =

Table Tennis – mixed doubles at the 2014 Commonwealth Games
- Venue: Scotstoun Sports Campus, Glasgow
- Dates: 30 July – 2 August 2014
- Competitors: 168 from 32 nations

Medalists
gold medal	Paul Drinkhall; Joanna Drinkhall	England
silver medal	Liam Pitchford; Tin-Tin Ho	England
bronze medal	Daniel Reed; Kelly Sibley	England

The Mixed doubles table tennis event at the 2014 Commonwealth Games was held from 30 July to 2 August at the Scotstoun Sports Campus in Glasgow.

== Draw ==
=== Top half ===
==== Section 1 ====
First Round; 30 July 09:30
29; 226	Bernard Sam (GHA); Mareen Adom Amankwaa (GHA)	12	11	11
124; 306	Alan Lin (VAN); Rosanna Abel (VAN)	10	5	7
62; 251	Maizar Adam Zahir (MDV); Fathimath Jumana Nimal (MDV)	5	11	9	10
92; 281	Nicholas Esther (SEY); Laura Sinon (SEY)	11	9	11	12
46; 242	Michael Owuor Otieno (KEN); Della Mgenya Njani (KEN)	4	3	9
40; 237	Simon Tomlinson (JAM); Shenique Clare (JAM)	11	11	11

Second Round; 30 July 10:30, 11:00
96; 282	Zhan Jian (SIN); Feng Tianwei (SIN)	11	11	11
29; 226	Bernard Sam (GHA); Mareen Adom Amankwaa (GHA)	4	7	2
92; 281	Nicholas Esther (SEY); Laura Sinon (SEY)	3	4	7
56; 246	Shakirin (MAS); Beh Lee Wei (MAS)	11	11	11
74; 262	Ashley Robinson (NIR); Ashley Givan (NIR)	11	11	3	11
31; 229	Christopher Franklin (GUY); Chelsea Edghill (GUY)	6	6	11	2
40; 237	Simon Tomliinson (JAM); Shenique Clare (JAM)	6	10	9
68; 260	Quadri Aruna (NGR); Olufunke Oshonaike (NGR)	11	12	11

Third Round; 30 July 16:00
96; 282	Zhan Jian (SIN); Feng Tianwei (SIN)	11	11	11
56; 246	Shakirin (MAS); Beh Lee Wei (MAS)	8	7	7
74; 262	Ashley Robinson (NIR); Ashley Givan (NIR)	2	6	7
68; 260	Quadri Aruna (NGR); Olufunke Oshonaike (NGR)	11	11	11

Fourth Round; 31 July 09:30
96; 282	Zhan Jian (SIN); Feng Tianwei (SIN)	13	11	11
68; 280	Quadri Aruna (NGR); Olufunke Oshonaike (NGR)	11	6	6

35; 236	Soumyajit Ghosh (IND); Poulomi Ghatak (IND)	11	11	11
81; 271	Tabish Khurshid (PAK); Abeera Sheikh (PAK)	13	11	11	81; 271	Tabish Khurshid (PAK); Abeera Sheikh (PAK)	8	5	4
84; 274	David Loi (PNG); Samantha Loi (PNG)	11	8	1	35; 236	Soumyajit Ghosh (IND); Poulomi Ghatak (IND)	11	10	11	1	8
120; 320	Kevin Evans Mafabi (UGA); Amina Lukaaya (UGA)	3	10	8	24; 220	Sam Walker (ENG); Karina le Fevre (ENG)	9	12	8	11	11
9; 208	Mark Dowell (BAR); Anthonette Riley (BAR)	11	12	11	9; 208	Mark Dowell (BAR); Anthonette Riley (BAR)	7	5	8
24; 220	Sam Walker (ENG); Karina le Fevre (ENG)	11	11	11
24; 220	Sam Walker (ENG); Karina le Fevre (ENG)	11	9	7	11	9
1; 204	William Henzell (AUS); Miao Miao (AUS)	4	11	11	7	11
104; 289	Rohan Sirisena (SRI); Ishara Madurangi (SRI)	11	11	11
90; 279	Sean Doherty (SCO); Corinna Whitaker (SCO)	6	5	6
104; 289	Rohan Sirisena (SRI); Ishara Madurangi (SRI)	4	11	11	3	7
79; 269	Peter Jackson (NZL); Sun Yang (NZL)	11	11	6	11	1; 204	William Henzell (AUS); Miao Miao (AUS)	11	9	5	11	11
128; 312	Daniel O'Connell (WAL); Chloe Thomas (WAL)	9	9	11	7	79; 269	Peter Jackson (NZL); Sun Yang (NZL)	10	9	4
1; 204	William Henzell (AUS); Miao Miao (AUS)	12	11	11

==== Section 2 ====
First Round; 30 July 09:30, 10:00
123; 305	Ham Lulu (VAN); Pareina Matariki (VAN)	11	11	3	11
85; 272	Gasika Sepa Simoi (PNG); Idau Chris (PNG)	7	9	11	3
28; 224	Samuel Akayade (GHA); Celia Baah-Danso (GHA)	11	3	13	11	11
117; 298	Yuvraaj Dookram (TTO); Aleena Edwards (TTO)	8	11	15	7	3
11; 206	Trevor Farley (BAR); Sherice Felix (BAR)	11	14	11
33; 230	Shamar Britton (GUY); Natalie Cummings (GUY)	7	12	6

Second Round; 30 July 11:00, 11:30
20; 218	Liam Pitchford (ENG); Tin-Tin Ho (ENG)	11	11	11
123; 305	Ham Lulu (VAN); Pareina Matariki (VAN)	4	3	3
28; 224	Samuel Akayade (GHA); Celia Baah-Danso (GHA)	6	5	10
126; 309	Ryan Jenkins (WAL); Charlotte Carey (WAL)	11	11	12
76; 266	Liu Tengteng (NZL); Karen Li (NZL)	11	11	11
43; 241	Josh Band (JER); Kevin le Maistre (JER)	8	8	6
11; 206	Trevor Farley (BAR); Sherice Felix (BAR)	2	5	3
38; 232	Sanil Shankar Shetty (IND); Manika Batra (IND)	11	11	11

Third Round; 30 July 16:00
20; 218	Liam Pitchford (ENG); Tin-Tin Ho (ENG)	11	11	11
126; 309	Ryan Jenkins (WAL); Charlotte Carey (WAL)	5	7	5
76; 266	Liu Tengteng (NZL); Karen Li (NZL)	11	12	11
38; 232	Sanil Shankar Shetty (IND); Manika Batra (IND)	6	10	8

Fourth Round; 31 July 09:30
20; 218	Liam Pitchford (ENG); Tin-Tin Ho (ENG)	11	11	11
76; 266	Liu Tengteng (NZL); Karen Li (NZL)	5	9	8

98; 285	Clarence Chew (SIN); Isabelle Li (SIN)	11	11	11
64; 252	Zeesth Naseem (MDV); Aminath Shiura Shareef (MDV)	5	7	4	107; 292	Nirmala Jayasinghe (SRI); Chamathsara Fernando (SRI)	2	4	8
107; 292	Nirmala Jayasinghe (SRI); Chamathsara Fernando (SRI)	11	11	11	98; 285	Clarence Chew (SIN); Isabelle Li (SIN)	9	11	7	11	15
110; 293	Romano Spencer (SVG); Unica Velox (SVG)	11	11	11	58; 249	Ashraf (MAS); Lee Rou You (MAS)	11	6	11	8	13
19; 215	Dane Taylor (DMA); Larrysa Dover (DMA)	9	2	7	110; 293	Romano Spencer (SVG); Unica Velox (SVG)	3	7	3
58; 249	Ashraf (MAS); Lee Rou You (MAS)	11	11	11
98; 285	Clarence Chew (SIN); Isabelle Li (SIN)	5	8	9
14; 212	Eugene Wang (CAN); Zhang Mo (CAN)	11	11	11
4; 205	Hu Heming (AUS); Melissa Tapper (AUS)	11	11	11
55; 245	Khethang Mothibi (LES); Nthabeleng Mokeki (LES)	5	6	8	47; 243	Anthony Mathenge Ringui (KEN); Jinita Azad Kumar Shah (KEN)	7	3	4
47; 243	Anthony Mathenge Ringui (KEN); Jinita Azad Kumar Shah (KEN)	11	11	11	4; 205	Hu Heming (AUS); Melissa Tapper (AUS)	4	9	13
66; 253	Brian Chan Yook Fo (MRI); Isabelle Chowree (MRI)	11	11	11	14; 212	Eugene Wang (CAN); Zhang Mo (CAN)	11	11	15
100; 287	Andre Freeman (SKN); Angelisa Freeman (SKN)	3	4	2	66; 253	Brian Chan Yook Fo (MRI); Isabelle Chowree (MRI)	3	7	2
14; 212	Eugene Wang (CAN); Zhang Mo (CAN)	11	11	11

=== Bottom half ===
==== Section 1 ====
First Round; 30 July 10:00
10; 207	Kevin Farley (BAR); Krystal Harvey (BAR)	5	11	9	11	11
26; 225	Derek Abrefa (GHA); Bernice Borquaye (GHA)	11	4	11	5	4
30; 228	Paul Davis (GUY); Trenace Lowe (GUY)	8	11	3	11	11
75; 263	Peter Graham (NIR); Emma Ludlow (NIR)	11	8	11	7	7
65; 254	Akhilen Yogarajah (MRI); Widaad Gukhool (MRI)	11	8	12	11	11
63; 250	Munsif Ahmed (MDV); Mueena Mohamed (MDV)	7	11	14	8	7

Second Round; 30 July 11:30, 12:00
97; 283	Li Hu (SIN); Yu Mengyu (SIN)	11	11	11
10; 207	Kevin Farley (BAR); Krystal Harvey (BAR)	4	7	8
30; 228	Paul David (GUY); Trenace Lowe (GUY)	10	4	13	11	11
78; 267	John Cordue (NZL); Annie Yang (NZL)	12	11	11	4	8
91; 227	Niall Cameron (SCO); Gillian Edwards (SCO)	11	11	11
86; 265	Hila Frank (PNG); Geru Elizabeth Lohia (PNG)	3	8	4
65; 254	Akhilen Yogarajah (MRI); Widaad Gukhool (MRI)	6	1	5
23; 217	Daniel Reed (ENG); Kelly Sibley (ENG)	11	11	11

Third Round; 30 July 16:40
97; 283	Li Hu (SIN); Yu Mengyu (SIN)	14	11	11
30; 228	Paul David (GUY); Trenace Lowe (GUY)	12	8	1
91; 277	Niall Cameron (SCO); Gillian Edwards (SCO)	7	5	3
23; 217	Daniel Reed (ENG); Kelly Sibley (ENG)	11	11	11

Fourth Round; 31 July 09:30
97; 283	Li Hu (SIN); Yu Mengyu (SIN)	7	8	9
23; 213	Daniel Reed (ENG); Kelly Sibley (ENG)	11	11	11

2; 201	David Powell (AUS); Jian Fang Lay (AUS)	11	11	11
102; 288	Samuel Morris (SLE); Stella Grant (SLE)	6	7	11	4	42; 239	Dale Parham (JAM); Dadrian Lewis (JAM)	3	4	5
42; 239	Dale Parham (JAM); Dadrian Lewis (JAM)	11	11	7	11	2; 201	David Powell (AUS); Jian Fang Lay (AUS)	11	11	11
129; 311	Conor Edwards (WAL); Angharad Phillips (WAL)	5	7	11	11	11	129; 311	Conor Edwards (WAL); Angharad Phillips (WAL)	3	9	8
115; 299	Curtis Humphreys (TTO); Ashley Quashie (TTO)	11	11	9	4	8	129; 311	Conor Edwards (WAL); Angharad Phillips (WAL)	12	11	11
16; 214	Pierre-Luc Thériault (CAN); Betty Guo (CAN)	10	9	6
2; 201	David Powell (AUS); Jian Fang Lay (AUS)	6	11	11	11	7
34; 233	Sharath Kamal (IND); Shamini Kumaresan (IND)	11	8	4	13	11
57; 247	Leong Chee Feng (MAS); Ho Ying (MAS)	12	12	11
105; 290	Udaya Ranasingha (SRI); Erandi Warusawithana (SRI)	11	10	11	11	105; 290	Ishara Ranasingha (SRI); Erandi Warusawithana (SRI)	10	10	5
82; 270	Muhammad Rameez (PAK); Farwa Babar (PAK)	1	12	5	3	57; 247	Leong Chee Feng (MAS); Ho Ying (MAS)	5	8	8
125; 307	Samuel Saul (VAN); Rosanna Abel (VAN)	6	7	7	34; 233	Sharath Kamal (IND); Shamini Kumaresan (IND)	11	11	11
121; 303	Paul Moody Mutambuze (UGA); Ludia Magandlen Natunga (UGA)	11	11	11	121; 303	Paul Moody Mutambuze (UGA); Ludia Magandlen Natunga (UGA)	4	4	4
34; 233	Sharath Kamal (IND); Shamini Kumaresan (IND)	11	11	11

==== Section 2 ====
21; 216	Paul Drinkhall (ENG); Joanna Drinkhall (ENG)	11	11	11	11
45; 244	Peter Muturi (KEN); Sejal Dipan Thakkar (KEN)	5	11	7	5	94; 280	Godfrey Sultan (SEY); Anniesa Benstrong (SEY)	4	6	13	0
94; 280	Godfrey Sultan (SEY); Anniesa Benstrong (SEY)	11	7	11	11	21; 216	Paul Drinkhall (ENG); Joanna Drinkhall (ENG)	11	11	12
59; 248	Foo Dunley (MAS); Ng Sock Khim (MAS)	11	11	11	5; 203	Yan Xin (AUS); Ziyu Zhang (AUS)	8	5	10
118; 301	Alan Resture (TUV); Kaimalie Resture (TUV)	3	2	4	59; 248	Dunley Foo (MAS); Ng Sock Khim (MAS)	5	11	7	5
5; 203	Yan Xin (AUS); Ziyu Zhang (AUS)	11	7	11	11
21; 216	Paul Drinkhall (ENG); Joanna Drinkhall (ENG)	11	11	4	7	11
15; 213	Andre Ho (CAN); Luo Anqi (CAN)	8	4	11	11	3
77; 268	Phillip Xiao (NZL); Jenny Hung (NZL)	6	11	11	11
25; 233	Felix Lartey (GHA); Cynthia Kwabi (GHA)	11	7	6	4
77; 268	Phillip Xiao (NZL); Jenny Hung (NZL)	11	5	6
32; 231	Idi Lewis (GUY); Jody-Ann Blake (GUY)	w/o	w/o	w/o	w/o	w/o	w/o	w/o	15; 213	Andre Ho (CAN); Luo Anqi (CAN)	13	11	11
13; 210	Thobo Matlhatsi (BOT); Boitshwarelo Butale (BOT)	X	X	X	X	X	X	X	13; 210	Thobo Malhatsi (BOT); Boitshwarelo Butale (BOT)	1	4	2
15; 213	Andre Ho (CAN); Luo Anqi (CAN)	11	11	11

37; 234	Amalraj Anthony Arputharaj (IND); Madhurika Suhas Patkar (IND)	11	11	11
116; 300	Aaron Wilson (TTO); Catherine Spicer (TTO)	11	11	11	116; 300	Aaron Wilson (TTO); Catherine Spicer (TTO)	4	8	9
39; 238	Kane Watson (JAM); Yvonne Forster (JAM)	9	9	7	37; 234	Amalraj Anthony Arputharaj (IND); Madhurika Suhas Patkar (IND)	11	11	9	11
106; 291	Dinesh Deshappriya (SRI); Hansani Piumila (SRI)	11	11	11	114; 297	Dexter St. Louis (TTO); Rheann Chung (TTO)	4	9	11	4
87; 293	Boe Mea (PNG); Maryanne Loi (PNG)	3	3	7	106; 291	Dinesh Deshappriya (SRI); Hansani Piumila (SRI)	11	6	3	11	7
114; 297	Dexter St. Louis (TTO); Rheann Chung (TTO)	9	11	11	8	11
37; 234	Amalraj Anthony Arputharaj (IND); Madhurika Suhas Patkar (IND)	11	3	10	11	4
95; 284	Gao Ning (SIN); Lin Ye (SIN)	7	11	12	7	11
127; 308	Stephen Jenkins (WAL); Naomi Owen (WAL)	11	11	11
73; 264	Paul McCreery (NIR); Hannah Lynch-Dawson (NIR)	4	2	8
127; 308	Stephen Jenkins (WAL); Naomi Owen (WAL)	11	5	5	4
122; 304	Yoshua Shing (VAN); Anolyn Lulu (VAN)	11	11	7	11	95; 284	Gao Ning (SIN); Lin Ye (SIN)	8	11	11	11
67; 255	Billy Chan Yook Fo (MRI); Deborah Wong (MRI)	6	6	11	9	122; 304	Yoshua Shing (VAN); Anolyn Lulu (VAN)	6	9	3
95; 284	Gao Ning (SIN); Lin Ye (SIN)	11	11	11

== Finals ==
Quarterfinals; 31 July 16:00
96; 282	Zhan Jian (SIN); Feng Tianwei (SIN)	11	11	14
1; 204	William Henzell (AUS); Miao Miao (AUS)	8	4	12
20; 218	Liam Pitchford (ENG); Tin-Tin Ho (ENG)	11	5	11	8	11
14; 212	Eugene Wang (CAN); Zhang Mo (CAN)	4	11	5	11	8
23; 217	Daniel Reed (ENG); Kelly Sibley (ENG)	11	11	5	12	11
34; 233	Sharath Kamal (IND); Shamini Kumaresan (IND)	7	9	11	14	4
21; 216	Paul Drinkhall (ENG); Joanna Drinkhall (ENG)	11	11	8	11
95; 284	Gao Ning (SIN); Lin Ye (SIN)	9	6	11	6

Semifinals; 01 August 13:40
96; 282	Zhan Jian (SIN); Feng Tianwei (SIN)	10	8	13	11	5
20; 218	Liam Pitchford (ENG); Tin-Tin Ho (ENG)	12	11	11	6	11
23; 217	Daniel Reed (ENG); Kelly Sibley (ENG)	5	11	11	8	8
21; 216	Paul Drinkhall (ENG); Joanna Drinkhall (ENG)	11	8	5	11	11

Gold medal match 02 August 13:15
20; 216	Liam Pitchford (ENG); Tin-Tin Ho (ENG)	7	3	11	12	5
21; 218	Paul Drinkhall (ENG); Joanna Drinkhall (ENG)	11	11	5	10	11
Bronze medal match 02 August 12:30
96; 282	Zhan Jian (SIN); Feng Tianwei (SIN)	11	9	7	10
23; 217	Daniel Reed (ENG); Kelly Sibley (ENG)	5	11	11	12
