= Table tennis at the 2014 Commonwealth Games – Women's singles =

Table Tennis – Women's singles at the 2014 Commonwealth Games
- Venue: Scotstoun Sports Campus, Glasgow
- Dates: 29 July – 1 August 2014
- Competitors: 86 from 35 nations

Medalists
gold medal	Feng Tianwei	Singapore
silver medal	Yu Mengyu	Singapore
bronze medal	Lin Ye	Singapore

The Women's singles table tennis event at the 2014 Commonwealth Games was held from 29 July to 1 August at the Scotstoun Sports Campus in Glasgow.

== Group stage ==
=== Pool A ===
Name	MP	MW	ML	GP	GW	GL	PW	PL	PT
Tin-Tin Ho (ENG)	2	2	0	8	8	0	88	52	4
Amina Lukaaya (UGA)	2	1	1	10	4	6	87	90	3
Aminath Shiura Shareef (MDV)	2	0	2	10	2	8	75	108	2

Qualified for the round of the 32

29 July 09:30 (Report)
Tin-Tin Ho (ENG)	11	11	11	11	4
Amina Lukaaya (UGA)	3	8	7	5	0

29 July 11:15 (Report)
Aminath Shiura Shareef (MDV)	2	5	14	11	8	6	2
Amina Lukaaya (UGA)	11	11	12	8	11	11	4

29 July 13:00 (Report)
Tin-Tin Ho (ENG)	11	11	11	11	4
Aminath Shiura Shareef (MDV)	7	9	6	7	0

=== Pool B ===
Name	MP	MW	ML	GP	GW	GL	PW	PL	PT
Charlotte Carey (WAL)	2	2	0	8	8	0	88	44	4
Natalie Cummings (GUY)	2	1	1	8	4	4	71	69	3
Jinita Azad Kumar Shah (KEN)	2	0	2	8	0	8	42	88	2

Qualified for the round of the 32

29 July 09:30 (Report)
Charlotte Carey (WAL)	11	11	11	11	4
Jinita Azad Kumar Shah (KEN)	3	6	6	2	0

29 July 11:15 (Report)
Natalie Cummings (GUY)	11	11	11	11	4
Jinita Azad Kumar Shah (KEN)	7	7	5	6	0

29 July 13:00 (Report)
Charlotte Carey (WAL)	11	11	11	11	4
Natalie Cummings (GUY)	7	6	7	7	0

=== Pool C ===
Name	MP	MW	ML	GP	GW	GL	PW	PL	PT
Offiong Edem (NGR)	2	2	0	8	8	0	88	18	4
Unica Velox (SVG)	2	1	1	9	4	5	61	78	3
Maryanne Robert Loi (PNG)	2	0	2	9	1	8	44	97	2

Qualified for the round of the 64

29 July 09:30 (Report)
Offiong Edem (NGR)	11	11	11	11	4
Maryanne Robert Loi (PNG)	4	1	3	2	0

29 July 11:15 (Report)
Unica Velox (SVG)	11	9	11	11	11	4
Maryanne Robert Loi (PNG)	6	11	6	8	3	1

29 July 13:00 (Report)
Offiong Edem (NGR)	11	11	11	11	4
Unica Velox (SVG)	2	2	2	2	0

=== Pool D ===
Name	MP	MW	ML	GP	GW	GL	PW	PL	PT
Rheann Chung (TTO)	2	2	0	8	8	0	88	44	4
Neema Dennis Mwaisyula (TAN)	2	1	1	8	4	4	60	61	3
Kaimalie Resture (TUV)	2	0	2	8	0	8	32	88	2

Qualified for the round of the 32

29 July 09:30 (Report)
Rheann Chung (TTO)	11	11	11	11	4
Kaimalie Resture (TUV)	3	6	3	3	0

29 July 11:15 (Report)
Neema Dennis Mwaisyula (TAN)	11	11	11	11	4
Kaimalie Resture (TUV)	8	3	3	3	0

29 July 13:00 (Report)
Rheann Chung (TTO)	11	11	11	11	4
Neema Dennis Mwaisyula (TAN)	5	4	5	2	0

=== Pool E ===
Name	MP	MW	ML	GP	GW	GL	PW	PL	PT
Cecilla Akpan (NGR)	2	2	0	8	8	0	88	39	4
Abeera Sheikh (PAK)	2	1	1	10	4	6	82	86	3
Boitshwarel Butale (BOT)	2	0	2	10	2	8	58	103	2

Qualified for the round of the 64

29 July 09:30 (Report)
Cecilla Akpan (NGR)	11	11	11	11	4
Abeera Sheikh (PAK)	4	4	7	8	0

29 July 11:15 (Report)
Boitshwarel Butare (BOT)	7	11	11	6	3	4	2
Abeera Sheikh (PAK)	11	6	9	11	11	11	4

29 July 13:00 (Report)
Cecilla Akpan (NGR)	11	11	11	11	4
Boitshwarel Butare (BOT)	1	5	6	4	0

=== Pool F ===
Name	MP	MW	ML	GP	GW	GL	PW	PL	PT
Annie Yang (NZL)	2	2	0	10	8	2	107	58	4
Emma Ludlow (NIR)	2	1	1	10	6	4	94	86	3
Stella Grant (SLE)	2	0	2	8	0	8	31	88	2

Qualified for the round of the 64

29 July 09:30 (Report)
Annie Yang (NZL)	11	11	11	11	4
Stella Grant (SLE)	1	1	4	2	0

29 July 11:15 (Report)
Emma Ludlow (NIR)	11	11	11	11	4
Stella Grant (SLE)	9	2	7	5	0

29 July 13:00 (Report)
Annie Yang (NZL)	11	9	11	9	12	11	4
Emma Ludlow (NIR)	8	11	2	11	10	8	2

=== Pool G ===
Name	MP	MW	ML	GP	GW	GL	PW	PL	PT
Amanda Mogey (NIR)	2	2	0	8	8	0	88	27	4
Farwa Babar (PAK)	2	1	1	8	4	4	61	63	3
Idau Boni Chris (PNG)	2	0	2	8	0	8	29	88	2

Qualified for the round of the 64

29 July 09:30 (Report)
Amanda Mogey (NIR)	11	11	11	11	4
Idau Boni Chris (PNG)	3	2	1	4	0

29 July 11:15 (Report)
Farwa Babar (PAK)	11	11	11	11	4
Idau Boni Chris (PNG)	3	5	7	4	0

29 July 13:00 (Report)
Amanda Mogey (NIR)	11	11	11	11	4
Farwa Babar (PAK)	2	9	2	4	0

=== Pool H ===
Name	MP	MW	ML	GP	GW	GL	PW	PL	PT
Ganiat Ogundele (NGR)	2	2	0	8	8	0	91	47	4
Agnes Wiron Ngodoki (TAN)	2	1	1	9	4	5	86	87	3
Ashley Quashie (TTO)	2	0	2	9	1	8	55	98	2

Qualified for the round of the 32

29 July 09:30 (Report)
Ganiat Ogundele (NGR)	11	11	11	11	4
Ashley Quashie (TTO)	1	6	6	2	0

29 July 11:15 (Report)
Agnes Wiron Ngodoki (TAN)	11	7	14	11	11	4
Ashley Quashie (TTO)	6	11	12	6	5	1

29 July 13:00 (Report)
Ganiat Ogundele (NGR)	12	11	13	11	4
Agnes Wiron Ngodoki (TAN)	10	3	11	8	0

=== Pool I ===
Name	MP	MW	ML	GP	GW	GL	PW	PL	PT
Ishara Madurangi (SRI)	2	2	0	8	8	0	88	47	4
Ludia Magandlen Natunga (UGA)	2	1	1	10	4	6	87	102	3
Rosanna Abel (VAN)	2	0	2	10	2	8	76	102	2

Qualified for the round of the 32

29 July 09:30 (Report)
Ishara Madurangi (SRI)	11	11	11	11	4
Rosanna Abel (VAN)	4	4	6	4	0

29 July 11:15 (Report)
Ludia Magandlen Natunga (UGA)	9	11	11	4	12	11	4
Rosanna Abel (VAN)	11	9	9	11	10	8	2

29 July 13:00 (Report)
Ishara Madurangi (SRI)	11	11	11	11	4
Ludia Magandlen Natunga (UGA)	7	9	7	6	0

=== Pool J ===
Name	MP	MW	ML	GP	GW	GL	PW	PL	PT
Ziyu Zhang (AUS)	2	2	0	8	8	0	88	29	4
Deborah Wong Yuen Kwong (MRI)	2	1	1	8	4	4	63	58	3
Samantha Loi (PNG)	2	0	2	8	0	8	24	88	2

Qualified for the round of the 32

29 July 10:40 (Report)
Ziyu Zhang (AUS)	11	11	11	11	4
Samantha Loi (PNG)	2	2	3	3	0

29 July 12:25 (Report)
Deborah Wong Yuen Kwong (MRI)	11	11	11	11	4
Samantha Loi (PNG)	5	2	3	4	0

29 July 14:10 (Report)
Ziyu Zhang (AUS)	11	11	11	11	4
Deborah Wong Yuen Kwong (MRI)	9	2	3	5	0

=== Pool K ===
Name	MP	MW	ML	GP	GW	GL	PW	PL	PT
Ying Ho (MAS)	2	2	0	8	8	0	88	29	4
Della Mgenya Njani (KEN)	2	1	1	8	4	4	56	72	3
Laura Sinon (SEY)	2	0	2	8	0	8	45	88	2

Qualified for the round of the 32

29 July 10:40 (Report)
Ho Ying (MAS)	11	11	11	11	4
Laura Sinon (SEY)	3	4	7	3	0

29 July 12:25 (Report)
Della Mgenya Njani (KEN)	11	11	11	11	4
Laura Sinon (SEY)	9	2	8	9	0

29 July 14:10 (Report)
Ho Ying (MAS)	11	11	11	11	4
Della Mgenya Njani (KEN)	5	5	1	1	0

=== Pool L ===
Name	MP	MW	ML	GP	GW	GL	PW	PL	PT
Megan Phillips (WAL)	2	2	0	9	8	1	100	55	4
Annies Benstrong (SEY)	2	1	1	9	5	4	85	71	3
Larrysa Dover (DMA)	2	0	2	8	0	8	29	88	2

Qualified for the round of the 64

29 July 10:40 (Report)
Megan Phillips (WAL)	11	11	12	11	11	4
Annies Benstrong (SEY)	13	2	10	7	9	1

29 July 12:25 (Report)
Larrysa Dover (DMA)	1	4	4	6	0
Annies Benstrong (SEY)	11	11	11	11	4

29 July 14:10 (Report)
Megan Phillips (WAL)	11	11	11	11	4
Larrysa Dover (DMA)	4	3	3	4	0

=== Pool N ===
Name	MP	MW	ML	GP	GW	GL	PW	PL	PT
Trenace Lowe (GUY)	2	2	0	9	8	1	102	72	4
Hansani Piumila (SRI)	2	1	1	9	4	5	83	87	3
Fathimath Jumana Nimal (MDV)	2	0	2	10	2	8	84	110	2

Qualified for the round of the 64

29 July 10:40 (Report)
Trenace Lowe (GUY)	12	11	11	11	4
Hansani Piumila (SRI)	10	3	8	9	0

29 July 12:25 (Report)
Fathimath Jumana Nimal (MDV)	7	9	11	6	9	1
Hansani Piumila (SRI)	11	11	9	11	11	4

29 July 14:10 (Report)
Trenace Lowe (GUY)	11	11	12	12	11	4
Fathimath Jumana Nimal (MDV)	9	7	14	10	2	1

=== Pool O ===
Name	MP	MW	ML	GP	GW	GL	PW	PL	PT
Ng Sock Khim (MAS)	2	2	0	10	8	2	105	52	4
Erandi Warusawithana (SRI)	2	1	1	11	6	5	91	88	3
Mwamvita Abdu Mohamed (TAN)	2	0	2	9	1	8	41	97	2

Qualified for the round of the 32

29 July 10:40 (Report)
Erandi Warusawithana (SRI)	11	11	11	9	11	4
Mwamvita Abdu Mohamed (TAN)	3	3	5	11	5	1

29 July 12:25 (Report)
Ng Sock Khim (MAS)	11	11	11	11	4
Mwamvita Abdu Mohamed (TAN)	6	2	5	1	0

29 July 14:10 (Report)
Erandi Warusawithana (SRI)	11	2	2	7	11	5	2
Ng Sock Khim (MAS)	9	11	11	11	8	11	4

=== Pool P ===
Name	MP	MW	ML	GP	GW	GL	PW	PL	PT
Alice Loveridge (GUE)	2	2	0	10	8	2	100	64	4
Gillian Edwards (SCO)	2	1	1	10	6	4	93	68	3
Pareina Matariki (VAN)	2	0	2	8	0	8	37	88	2

Qualified for the round of the 64

29 July 10:40 (Report)
Gillian Edwards (SCO)	7	11	11	6	6	8	2
Alice Loveridge (GUE)	11	6	6	11	11	11	4

29 July 12:25 (Report)
Pareina Matariki (VAN)	5	2	4	4	0
Alice Loveridge (GUE)	11	11	11	11	4

29 July 14:10 (Report)
Gillian Edwards (SCO)	11	11	11	11	4
Pareina Matariki (VAN)	6	7	4	5	0

=== Pool Q ===
Name	MP	MW	ML	GP	GW	GL	PW	PL	PT
Aleena Edwards (TTO)	2	1	1	11	6	5	102	94	3
Kelsey le Maistre (JER)	2	1	1	10	5	5	87	93	3
Krystle Harvey (BAR)	2	1	1	11	5	6	101	103	3

Qualified for the round of the 32

29 July 16:00 (Report)
Aleena Edwards (TTO)	11	7	11	11	11	4
Kelsey le Maistre (JER)	6	11	9	5	4	1

29 July 17:45 (Report)
Krystle Harvey (BAR)	9	4	9	11	9	1
Kelsey le Maistre (JER)	11	11	11	8	11	4

29 July 19:30 (Report)
Aleena Edwards (TTO)	11	10	6	5	11	8	2
Krystle Harvey (BAR)	6	12	11	11	8	11	4

=== Pool R ===
Name	MP	MW	ML	GP	GW	GL	PW	PL	PT
Ashley Givan (NIR)	2	2	0	9	8	1	101	64	4
Isabelle Chowree (MRI)	2	1	1	8	4	4	72	72	3
Dadrian Lewis (JAM)	2	0	2	9	1	8	61	98	2

Qualified for the round of the 64

29 July 16:00 (Report)
Ashley Givan (NIR)	11	11	11	10	11	4
Dadrian Lewis (JAM)	4	4	9	12	7	1

29 July 17:45 (Report)
Isabelle Chowree (MRI)	11	11	11	11	4
Dadrian Lewis (JAM)	8	8	4	5	0

29 July 19:30 (Report)
Ashley Givan (NIR)	14	11	11	11	4
Isabelle Chowree (MRI)	12	4	3	9	0

=== Pool S ===
Name	MP	MW	ML	GP	GW	GL	PW	PL	PT
Lynda Flaws (SCO)	2	2	0	11	8	3	117	84	4
Yvonne Forster (JAM)	2	1	1	11	7	4	106	88	3
Angelisa Freeman (SKN)	2	0	2	8	0	8	37	88	2

Qualified for the round of the 64

29 July 16:00 (Report)
Lynda Flaws (SCO)	11	11	11	11	4
Angelisa Freeman (SKN)	9	5	6	2	0

29 July 17:45 (Report)
Yvonne Forster (JAM)	11	11	11	11	4
Angelisa Freeman (SKN)	1	4	5	5	0

29 July 19:30 (Report)
Lynda Flaws (SCO)	11	8	11	12	9	11	11	4
Yvonne Forster (JAM)	6	11	2	10	11	13	9	3

=== Pool U ===
Name	MP	MW	ML	GP	GW	GL	PW	PL	PT
Betty Guo (CAN)	2	2	0	8	8	0	88	46	4
Celia Baah-Danso (GHA)	2	1	1	10	4	6	84	93	3
Anthonette Riley (BAR)	2	0	2	10	2	8	68	101	2

Qualified for the round of the 64

29 July 16:00 (Report)
Betty Guo (CAN)	11	11	11	11	4
Anthonette Riley (BAR)	3	7	7	2	0

29 July 17:45 (Report)
Celia Baah-Danso (GHA)	11	11	11	7	6	11	4
Anthonette Riley (BAR)	7	3	8	11	11	9	2

29 July 19:30 (Report)
Betty Guo (CAN)	11	11	11	11	4
Celia Baah-Danso (GHA)	8	5	7	7	0

=== Pool V ===
Name	MP	MW	ML	GP	GW	GL	PW	PL	PT
Dawn Morgan (GUE)	2	2	0	11	8	3	89	50	4
Corinna Whitaker (SCO)	2	1	1	8	4	4	79	51	3
Nthabeleng Mokeki (LES)	2	0	2	8	0	8	21	88	2

Qualified for the round of the 64

29 July 16:00 (Report)
Corinna Whitaker (SCO)	11	11	11	11	4
Nthabeleng Mokeki (LES)	2	2	1	1	0

29 July 17:45 (Report)
Dawn Morgan (GUE)	11	11	11	11	4
Nthabeleng Mokeki (LES)	6	3	2	4	0

29 July 19:30 (Report)
Corinna Whitaker (SCO)	9	10	7	9	0
Dawn Morgan (GUE)	11	12	11	11	4

=== Pool W ===
Name	MP	MW	ML	GP	GW	GL	PW	PL	PT
Chelsea Edghill (GUY)	2	2	0	8	8	0	88	42	4
Cynthia Kwabi (GHA)	2	1	1	9	4	5	83	82	3
Magdeline Tshepiso Rebatenne (BOT)	2	0	2	9	1	8	51	98	2

Qualified for the round of the 64

29 July 16:00 (Report)
Cynthia Kwabi (GHA)	11	11	10	11	11	4
Magdeline Tshepiso Rebatenne (BOT)	7	9	12	2	8	1

29 July 17:45 (Report)
Chelsea Edghill (GUY)	11	11	11	11	4
Magdeline Tshepiso Rebatenne (BOT)	3	3	2	5	0

29 July 19:30 (Report)
Cynthia Kwabi (GHA)	7	8	6	6	0
Chelsea Edghill (GUY)	11	11	11	11	4

=== Pool X ===
Name	MP	MW	ML	GP	GW	GL	PW	PL	PT
Shenique Clare (JAM)	2	2	0	11	8	3	109	91	4
Bernice Borquaye (GHA)	2	1	1	11	6	5	101	100	3
Sherice Felix (BAR)	2	0	2	10	2	8	81	100	2

Qualified for the round of the 64

29 July 16:00 (Report)
Sherice Felix (BAR)	8	9	11	7	9	1
Bernice Borquaye (GHA)	11	11	3	11	11	4

29 July 17:45 (Report)
Shenique Clare (JAM)	12	7	4	11	11	11	4
Bernice Borquaye (GHA)	10	11	11	9	5	8	2

29 July 19:30 (Report)
Sherice Felix (BAR)	7	5	11	7	7	1
Shenique Clare (JAM)	11	11	9	11	11	4

=== Pool Z ===
Name	MP	MW	ML	GP	GW	GL	PW	PL	PT
Widaad Gukhool (MRI)	3	3	0	15	12	3	154	104	6
Anolyn Lulu (VAN)	3	2	1	18	10	8	178	157	5
Mueena Mohamed (MDV)	3	1	2	17	8	9	142	158	4
Sejal Dipan Thakkar (KEN)	3	0	3	14	2	12	93	148	3

Qualified for the round of the 64

29 July 16:00 (Report)
Anolyn Lulu (VAN)	11	10	11	11	11	4
Sejal Dipan Thakkar (KEN)	5	12	6	3	4	1

29 July 16:00 (Report)
Mueena Mohamed (MDV)	3	3	3	11	9	1
Widaad Gukhool (MRI)	11	11	11	2	11	4

29 July 17:45 (Report)
Anolyn Lulu (VAN)	6	7	13	11	7	9	2
Widaad Gukhool (MRI)	11	11	11	9	11	11	4

29 July 17:45 (Report)
Mueena Mohamed (MDV)	6	11	11	11	11	4
Sejal Dipan Thakkar (KEN)	11	9	9	6	7	1

29 July 19:30 (Report)
Anolyn Lulu (VAN)	8	12	11	11	12	5	11	4
Mueena Mohamed (MDV)	11	10	6	8	14	11	3	3

29 July 19:30 (Report)
Sejal Dipan Thakkar (KEN)	5	7	7	2	0
Widaad Gukhool (MRI)	11	11	11	11	4

== Knockout stage ==
=== Top half ===
==== Section 1 ====
First round 30 July 14:00
278	Lynda Flaws (SCO)	3	7	5	7
257	Cecilla Akpan (NGR)	11	11	11	11
261	Amanda Mogey (NIR)	11	11	11	11
214	Betty Guo (CAN)	9	4	8	8

Second round 30 July 17:40
282	Feng Tianwei (SIN)	11	11	11	11
257	Cecilla Akpan (NGR)	9	9	5	4
309	Charlotte Carey (WAL)	1	11	8	11	8	11	7
202	Zhenhua Dederko (AUS)	11	9	11	8	11	7	11
246	Beh Lee Wei (MAS)	11	11	11	11
298	Aleena Edwards (TTO)	4	4	6	4
261	Amanda Mogey (NIR)	2	3	4	10
265	Chunli Li (NZL)	11	11	11	12

Third round 31 July 11:15
282	Feng Tianwei (SIN)	11	7	11	11	11
202	Zhenhua Dederko (AUS)	9	11	7	9	8
246	Beh Lee Wei (MAS)	11	8	7	11	11	10	12
265	Chunli Li (NZL)	9	11	11	8	9	12	10

Quarterfinals; 31 July 17:50
282	Feng Tianwei (SIN)	11	11	11	11
246	Beh Lee Wei (MAS)	2	5	3	6

==== Section 2 ====
First round 30 July 14:00
221	Dawn Morgan (GUE)	7	2	6	6
267	Annie Yang (NZL)	11	11	11	11
310	Megan Phillips (WAL)	11	10	14	6	10	11	11
229	Chelsea Edghill (GUY)	6	12	12	11	12	7	7

Second round 30 July 17:40, 18:25
232	Manika Batra (IND)	11	11	11	11
267	Annie Yang (NZL)	5	3	6	6
203	Ziyu Zhang (AUS)	11	5	9	10	11	11	5
213	Luo Anqi (CAN)	6	11	11	12	4	8	11
217	Kelly Sibley (ENG)	w/o	w/o	w/o	w/o
248	Ng Sock Khim (MAS)	X	X	X	X
310	Megan Phillips (WAL)	7	11	2	8	3
284	Lin Ye (SIN)	11	4	11	11	11

Third round 31 July 12:00
232	Manika Batra (IND)	11	11	8	11	11	11
213	Luo Anqi (CAN)	13	7	11	2	7	9
217	Kelly Sibley (ENG)	4	9	11	8	3
284	Lin Ye (SIN)	11	11	5	11	11

Quarterfinals; 31 July 17:50
232	Manika Batra (IND)	4	2	11	7	7
284	Lin Ye (SIN)	11	11	5	11	11

=== Bottom half ===
==== Section 1 ====
First round 30 July 14:00
237	Shenique Clare (JAM)	12	9	5	8	7
256	Offiong Edem (NGR)	10	11	11	11	11
228	Trenace Lowe (GUY)	7	8	7	3
262	Ashley Givan (NIR)	11	11	11	11

Second round 30 July 18:25, 19:10
216	Joanna Drinkhall (ENG)	11	11	11	11
256	Offiong Edem (NGR)	6	8	3	8
297	Rheann Chung (TTO)	5	9	11	9	8
308	Naomi Owen (WAL)	11	11	9	11	11
234	Madhurika Suhas Patkar (IND)	12	11	11	15
289	Ishara Madurangi (SRI)	10	9	6	13
262	Ashley Givan (NIR)	2	9	4	7
201	Jian Fang Lay (AUS)	11	11	11	11

Third round 31 July 12:00
216	Joanna Drinkhall (ENG)	10	11	7	7	6
308	Naomi Owen (WAL)	12	8	11	11	11
234	Madhurika Suhas Patkar (IND)	8	7	12	11	11	8	7
201	Jian Fang Lay (AUS)	11	11	10	7	9	11	11

Quarterfinals; 31 July 18:40
308	Naomi Owen (WAL)	9	11	9	10	7
201	Jian Fang Lay (AUS)	11	7	11	12	11

==== Section 2 ====
First round 30 July 14:00
254	Widaad Gukhool (MRI)	7	11	9	8	11	5
222	Alice Loveridge (GUE)	11	9	11	11	8	11

Second round 30 July 19:10
212	Zhang Mo (CAN)	11	11	11	11
222	Alice Loveridge (GUE)	8	3	5	6
247	Ho Ying (MAS)	5	9	10	5
266	Karen Li (NZL)	11	11	12	11
233	Shamini Kumaresan (IND)	11	6	11	9	11	8	11
258	Ganiat Ogundele (NGR)	3	11	4	11	9	11	7
218	Tin-Tin Ho (ENG)	7	15	1	5	2
283	Yu Mengyu (SIN)	11	13	11	11	11

Third round 31 July 12:00
212	Zhang Mo (CAN)	11	12	11	11
266	Karen Li (NZL)	5	10	2	7
233	Shamini Kumaresan (IND)	11	5	14	4	9
283	Yu Mengyu (SIN)	9	11	16	11	11

Quarterfinals; 31 July 18:40
212	Zhang Mo (CAN)	9	6	11	9	9
283	Yu Mengyu (SIN)	11	11	5	11	11

== Finals ==
Semifinals; 01 August 11:05
282	Feng Tianwei (SIN)	13	9	11	12	11
284	Lin Ye (SIN)	11	11	9	10	8
201	Jian Fang Lay (AUS)	3	8	8	6
283	Yu Mengyu (SIN)	11	11	11	11

Gold medal match 01 August 18:45
282	Feng Tianwei (SIN)	11	11	11	10	11
283	Yu Mengyu (SIN)	7	8	9	12	2
Bronze medal match 01 August 18:00
284	Lin Ye (SIN)	11	11	11	11
201	Jian Fang Lay (AUS)	5	4	7	7
