= Vanuatu at the 2014 Commonwealth Games =

- CG code: VAN
- CGA: Vanuatu Association of Sports and National Olympic Committee
- Website: oceaniasport.com/vanuatu

in Glasgow, Scotland
- Competitors: 12 in 2 sports
- Flag bearer: Yoshua Shing
- Medals: Gold 0 Silver 0 Bronze 0 Total 0

Commonwealth Games appearances (overview)
- 1982; 1986; 1990; 1994; 1998; 2002; 2006; 2010; 2014; 2018; 2022; 2026; 2030

Vanuatu competed in the 2014 Commonwealth Games in Glasgow, Scotland from 23 July – 3 August 2014. A team of 12 athletes in 2 sports are representing the country. Participating in their ninth Commonwealth Games, Vanuatuans have never yet won a medal.

== Judo ==
Men

| Athlete | Event | Round of 32 | Round of 16 | Quarterfinal | Semifinal | Repechage | Final / BM | |
| Athlete | Event | Opposition Result | Opposition Result | Opposition Result | Opposition Result | Opposition Result | Opposition Result | Rank |
|---|---|---|---|---|---|---|---|---|
| Joe Mahit | −66 kg | D Rahming Jr (BAH); W 1010-0000 | J Millar (SCO); L 0000-1000 | did not advance | | | | |
| Rexly Theuil | −66 kg | M Punza (ZAM); L 0000-1010 | did not advance | | | | | |
| Marceau Rouvoune | −73 kg | C Repiyallage (SRI); L 0000-1100 | did not advance | | | | | |

== Table Tennis ==
Singles

| Athlete | Event | Group Stage | | | | Round of 64 | Round of 32 | Round of 16 | Quarterfinals | Semifinals | Final | Rank |
| Athlete | Event | Opposition Result | Opposition Result | Opposition Result | Rank | Opposition Result | Opposition Result | Opposition Result | Opposition Result | Opposition Result | Opposition Result | Rank |
|---|---|---|---|---|---|---|---|---|---|---|---|---|
| Alan Lin | Men's singles | Thériault (CAN); L 0 – 4 | Chelibe (UGA); L 0 – | —N/a | 3 | did not advance | | | | | | |
| Ham Lulu | Men's singles | Zahir (MDV); W 4 – 0 | Abrefa (GHA); L 0 – 4 | —N/a | 2 | did not advance | | | | | | |
| Yoshua Shing | Men's singles | Loi (PNG); W 4 – 0 | David (GUY); L 3 – 4 | —N/a | 2 | did not advance | | | | | | |
| Rosanna Abel | Women's singles | Madurangi (SRI); L 0 – 4 | Natunga (UGA); L 2 – 4 | —N/a | 3 | did not advance | | | | | | |
| Anolyn Lulu | Women's singles | Thakkar (KEN); W 4 – 1 | Gukhool (MRI); L 2 – 4 | Mohamed (MDV); W 4 – 3 | 2 | did not advance | | | | | | |
| Pareina Matariki | Women's singles | Loveridge (GUE); L 0 – 4 | Edwards (SCO); L 0 – 4 | —N/a | 3 | did not advance | | | | | | |

Doubles

| Athlete | Event | Round of 128 | Round of 64 | Round of 32 | Round of 16 | Quarterfinals | Semifinals | Final | Rank |
| Athlete | Event | Opposition Result | Opposition Result | Opposition Result | Opposition Result | Opposition Result | Opposition Result | Opposition Result | Rank |
|---|---|---|---|---|---|---|---|---|---|
| Alan Lin; Samuel Saul | Men's doubles | —N/a | Malawi; L 0 – 3 | did not advance | | | | | |
| Yoshua Shing; Ham Lulu | Men's doubles | —N/a | Jamaica; W 3 – 2 | Canada; L 0 – 3 | did not advance | | | | |
| Anolyn Lulu; Pareina Matariki | Women's doubles | —N/a | Barbados; L 0 – 3 | did not advance | | | | | |
| Rosanna Abel; Roanna Abel | Women's doubles | —N/a | Bye | Northern Ireland; L 0 – 3 | did not advance | | | | |
| Alan Lin; Rosanna Abel | Mixed doubles | Ghana; L 0 – 3 | did not advance | | | | | | |
| Ham Lulu; Pareina Matariki | Mixed doubles | Papua New Guinea; W 3 – 1 | England; L 0 – 3 | did not advance | | | | | |
| Samuel Saul; Roanna Abel | Mixed doubles | Uganda; L 0 – 3 | did not advance | | | | | | |
| Yoshua Shing; Anolyn Lulu | Mixed doubles | Mauritius; W 3 – 1 | Singapore; L 0 – 3 | did not advance | | | | | |

Team

| Athlete | Event | Group Stage | | | | Round of 16 | Quarterfinals | Semifinals | Final | Rank |
| Athlete | Event | Opposition Result | Opposition Result | Opposition Result | Rank | Opposition Result | Opposition Result | Opposition Result | Opposition Result | Rank |
|---|---|---|---|---|---|---|---|---|---|---|
| Alan Lin; Ham Lulu; Samuel Saul; Yoshua Shing | Men's Team | India; L 0-3 | Guyana; L 0-3 | Northern Ireland; L 0-3 | 4 qB | Saint Lucia; W 3-2 | Ghana; L 0-3 | did not advance | | |
| Roanna Abel; Rosanna Abel; Anolyn Lulu; Pareina Matariki | Women's Team | New Zealand; L 0-3 | Mauritius; L 0-3 | Wales; L 0-3 | 4 qB | Tanzania; L 1-3 | did not advance | | | |

Qualification Legend: Q=Main Bracket (medal); qB=Consolation Bracket (non-medal)
