= Table tennis at the 2014 Commonwealth Games – Women's doubles =

Table Tennis – Women's doubles at the 2014 Commonwealth Games
- Venue: Scotstoun Sports Campus, Glasgow
- Dates: 31 July – 2 August 2014
- Competitors: 80 from 25 nations

Medalists
gold medal	Feng Tianwei; Yu Mengyu	Singapore
silver medal	Jian Fang Lay; Miao Miao	Australia
bronze medal	Anqi Luo; Zhang Mo	Canada

The Women's doubles table tennis event at the 2014 Commonwealth Games was held from 31 July to 2 August at the Scotstoun Sports Campus in Glasgow.

== Draw ==
=== Top half ===
==== Section 1 ====
First round 31 July 10:30
275; 276	Geru Elizabeth Lohia (PNG); Eileen Tongia (PNG)	7	2	2
278; 279	Lynda Flaws (SCO); Corinna Whitaker (SCO)	11	11	11
206; 207	Sherice Felix (BAR); Krystal Harvey (BAR)	11	12	11
304; 305	Anolyn Lulu (VAN); Pareina Matariki (VAN)	4	10	6

Second round 31 July 13:40, 16:00
282; 283	Feng Tianwei (SIN); Yu Mengyu (SIN)	11	11	11
278; 279	Lynda Flaws (SCO); Corinna Whitaker (SCO)	5	8	1
280; 281	Anniesa Benstrong (SEY); Laura Sinon (SEY)	4	7	4
309; 308	Charlotte Carey (WAL); Naomi Owen (WAL)	11	11	11
249; 247	Lee Rou You (MAS); Ho Ying (MAS)	11	11	11
253; 254	Isabelle Chowree (MRI); Widaad Gukhool (MRI)	7	6	5
206; 207	Sherice Felix (BAR); Krystal Harvey (BAR)	2	6	4
265; 266	Chunli Li (NZL); Karen Li (NZL)	11	11	11

Third round 01 August 09:30
282; 283	Feng Tianwei (SIN); Yu Mengyu (SIN)	11	11	11
308; 309	Charlotte Carey (WAL); Naomi Owen (WAL)	9	4	7
249; 247	Lee Rou You (MAS); Ho Ying (MAS)	9	9	5
265; 266	Chunli Li (NZL); Karen Li (NZL)	11	11	11

Quarterfinals; 01 August 12:40
282; 283	Feng Tianwei (SIN); Yu Mengyu (SIN)	11	11	9	11
265; 266	Chunli Li (NZL); Karen Li (NZL)	5	3	11	3

==== Section 2 ====
First round 31 July 10:30
270; 271	Farwa Babar (PAK); Abeera Sheikh (PAK)	9	9	8
264; 263	Hannah Lynch-Dawson (NIR); Emma Ludlow (NIR)	11	11	11
224; 223	Celia Baah-Danso (GHA); Cynthia Kwabi (GHA)	11	8	6	5
237; 238	Shenique Clare (JAM); Yvonne Forster (JAM)	8	11	11	11

Second round 31 July 13:40, 16:00
233; 234	Shamini Kumaresan (IND); Madhurika Suhas Patkar (IND)	7	11	11	11
264; 263	Hannah Lynch-Dawson (NIR); Emma Ludlow (NIR)	11	3	4	7
297; 299	Rheann Chung (TTO); Ashley Quashie (TTO)	9	9	8
202; 203	Zhenhua Dederko (AUS); Ziyu Zhang (AUS)	11	11	11
289; 290	Ishara Madurangi (SRI); Erandi Warusawithana (SRI)	8	7	11	11	11
229; 228	Chelsea Edghill (GUY); Trenace Lowe (GUY)	11	11	8	9	8
237; 238	Shenique Clare (JAM); Yvonne Forster (JAM)	7	2	10
216; 217	Joanna Drinkhall (ENG); Kelly Sibley (ENG)	11	11	12

Third round 01 August 09:30
233; 234	Shamini Kumaresan (IND); Madhurika Suhas Patkar (IND)	10	7	11	11	11
202; 203	Zhenhua Dederko (AUS); Ziyu Zhang (AUS)	12	11	8	8	9
289; 290	Ishara Madurangi (SRI); Erandi Warusawithana (SRI)	7	3	2
216; 217	Joanna Drinkhall (ENG); Kelly Sibley (ENG)	11	11	11

Quarterfinals; 01 August 12:40
233; 234	Shamini Kumaresan (IND); Madhurika Suhas Patkar (IND)	10	10	11	2
216; 217	Joanna Drinkhall (ENG); Kelly Sibley (ENG)	12	12	8	11

=== Bottom half ===
==== Section 1 ====
First round 31 July 10:30
222; 221	Alice Loveridge (GUE); Dawn Morgan (GUE)	11	11	10	11
292; 291	Chamathsara Fernando (SRI); Hansani Piumila (SRI)	6	8	12	9
210; 211	Boitshwarelo Butare (BOT); Magdeline Tshepiso Rebatenne (BOT)	7	4	5
298; 300	Aleena Edwards (TTO); Catherine Spicer (TTO)	11	11	11

Second round 31 July 13:40, 16:00
213; 212	Anqi Luo (CAN); Zhang Mo (CAN)	12	11	11
222; 221	Alice Loveridge (GUE); Dawn Morgan (GUE)	10	3	7
306; 307	Rosanna Abel (VAN); Roanna Abel (VAN)	3	4	5
262; 261	Ashley Givan (NIR); Amanda Mogey (NIR)	11	11	11
257; 260	Cecilla Akpan (NGR); Olufunke Oshonaike (NGR)	8	8	4
246; 248	Beh Lee Wei (MAS); Ng Sock Khim (MAS)	11	11	11
298; 300	Aleena Edwards (TTO); Catherine Spicer (TTO)	7	3	4
235; 236	Ankita Das (IND); Poulomi Ghatak (IND)	11	11	11

Third round 01 August 09:30
213; 212	Anqi Luo (CAN); Zhang Mo (CAN)	11	11	11
262; 261	Ashley Givan (NIR); Amanda Mogey (NIR)	7	6	3
246; 248	Beh Lee Wei (MAS); Ng Sock Khim (MAS)	11	8	11	8	11
235; 236	Ankita Das (IND); Poulomi Ghatak (IND)	7	11	7	11	4

Quarterfinals; 01 August 12:40
213; 212	Anqi Luo (CAN); Zhang Mo (CAN)	11	11	8	11	11
246; 248	Beh Lee Wei (MAS); Ng Sock Khim (MAS)	8	5	11	13	6

==== Section 2 ====
First round 31 July 10:30
250; 251	Mueena Mohamed (MDV); Fathimath Jumana Nimal (MDV)	11	11	11
272; 273	Idau Chris (PNG); Maryanne Loi (PNG)	5	9	3
226; 225	Mareen Adom Amankwaa (GHA); Bernice Borquaye (GHA)	9	11	11	11
302; 303	Amina Lukaaya (UGA); Ludia Magandlen Natunga (UGA)	11	8	5	8

Second round 31 July 13:40
201; 204	Jian Fang Lay (AUS); Miao Miao (AUS)	11	11	11
250; 251	Mueena Mohamed (MDV); Fathimath Jumana Nimal (MDV)	6	3	4
231; 230	Jody Ann-Blake (GUY); Natalie Cummings (GUY)	w/o	w/o	w/o	w/o	w/o	w/o	w/o
218; 220	Tin-Tin Ho (ENG); Karina le Fevre (ENG)	X	X	X	X	X	X	X
268; 267	Jenny Hung (NZL); Annie Yang (NZL)	7	2	9
311; 312	Angharad Phillips (WAL); Chloe Thomas (WAL)	11	11	11
226; 225	Mareen Adom Amankwaa (GHA); Bernice Borquaye (GHA)	2	3	1
284; 286	Lin Ye (SIN); Zhou Yihan (SIN)	11	11	11

Third round 01 August 09:30
201; 204	Jian Fang Lay (AUS); Miao Miao (AUS)	11	11	11
218; 220	Tin-Tin Ho (ENG); Karina le Fevre (ENG)	5	4	1
311; 312	Angharad Phillips (WAL); Chloe Thomas (WAL)	10	5	8
284; 286	Lin Ye (SIN); Zhou Yihan (SIN)	12	11	11

Quarterfinals; 01 August 12:40
201; 204	Jian Fang Lay (AUS); Miao Miao (AUS)	7	7	11	11	11
284; 286	Lin Ye (SIN); Zhou Yihan (SIN)	11	11	7	3	9

== Finals ==
Semifinals; 02 August 09:30, 10:10
282; 283	Feng Tianwei (SIN); Yu Mengyu (SIN)	11	11	11
216; 217	Joanna Drinkhall (ENG); Kelly Sibley (ENG)	9	9	6
213; 212	Anqi Luo (CAN); Zhang Mo (CAN)	8	7	7
201; 204	Jian Fang Lay (AUS); Miao Miao (AUS)	11	11	11

Gold medal match 02 August 16:50
282; 283	Feng Tianwei (SIN); Yu Mengyu (SIN)	11	8	11	11
201; 204	Jian Fang Lay (AUS); Miao Miao (AUS)	5	11	8	5
Bronze medal match 02 August 16:00
216; 217	Joanna Drinkhall (ENG); Kelly Sibley (ENG)	11	12	8	12	10
212; 213	Anqi Luo (CAN); Zhang Mo (CAN)	6	10	11	14	12
