= Vanuatu at the Commonwealth Games =

- CG code: VAN
- CGA: Vanuatu Association of Sports and National Olympic Committee
- Website: afcnovasanoc.wixsite.com/vasanoc
- Medals Ranked 58th: Gold 0 Silver 0 Bronze 3 Total 3

Commonwealth Games appearances (overview)
- 1982; 1986; 1990; 1994; 1998; 2002; 2006; 2010; 2014; 2018; 2022; 2026; 2030

Vanuatu has competed in ten of the twenty previous Commonwealth Games; starting at the Games in 1982. Vanuatu won its first medals at the 2018 games, when Friana Kwevira won bronze in the women's F46 javelin throw and when Miller Pata and Linline Matauatu won bronze in beach volleyball.

== Medalists ==
Medal	Name	Sport	Event	Edition
Bronze	Friana Kwevira	Athletics	Women's javelin throw (F46)	2018
Bronze	Linline Matauatu; Miller Pata	Beach volleyball	Women's tournament	2018
Bronze	Sherysyn Toko; Miller Pata	Beach volleyball	Women's tournament	2022

== See also ==
- All-time medal tally of Commonwealth Games
