= Maldives at the 2014 Commonwealth Games =

- Flag of Maldives
- CG code: MDV
- CGA: Maldives Olympic Committee

in Glasgow, Scotland
- Competitors: 23 in 5 sports
- Flag bearer: Hassan Saaid
- Medals: Gold 0 Silver 0 Bronze 0 Total 0

Commonwealth Games appearances (overview)
- 1986; 1990; 1994; 1998; 2002; 2006; 2010; 2014; 2018; 2022; 2026; 2030

The Maldives competed in the 2014 Commonwealth Games in Glasgow, Scotland from July 23 to August 3, 2014.

== Athletics ==
Key

- Note – Ranks given for track events are within the athlete's heat only
- Q = Qualified for the next round
- q = Qualified for the next round as a fastest loser or, in field events, by position without achieving the qualifying target
- NR = National record
- N/A = Round not applicable for the event

Men
Track & road events

Athlete	Event	Heat		Semifinal		Final	
Athlete	Event	Result	Rank	Result	Rank	Result	Rank
Hassan Saaid	100 m	10.79	42	did not advance			
Hassan Saaid	200 m	21.38	40	did not advance			
Hussain Inaas	200 m	22.78	65	did not advance			
Hussain Inaas	400 m	50.02	42	did not advance			

== Badminton ==
Singles

Athlete	Event	Round of 64	Round of 32	Round of 16	Quarterfinals	Semifinals	Final	Rank
Athlete	Event	Opposition Score	Opposition Score	Opposition Score	Opposition Score	Opposition Score	Opposition Score	Rank
Mohamed Ajfan Rasheed	Men's Singles	Ekiring (UGA); L 0 - 2	did not advance					
Mohamed Sarim	Men's Singles	Fowke (NZL); L 0 - 2	did not advance					
Nasheeu Sharafuddeen	Men's Singles	Benjamin (SHN); W 2 - 0	Karunaratne (SRI); L 0 - 2	did not advance				
Maisa Ismail	Women's Singles	Williams (JAM); L 0 - 2	did not advance					
Aishath Rasheed	Women's Singles	Rathnasiri (SRI); L 0 - 2	did not advance					

Doubles

Athlete	Event	Round of 64	Round of 32	Round of 16	Quarterfinals	Semifinals	Final	Rank
Athlete	Event	Opposition Score	Opposition Score	Opposition Score	Opposition Score	Opposition Score	Opposition Score	Rank
Mohamed Ajfan Rasheed; Nasheeu Sharafuddeen	Men's Doubles	Bye	Scotland; L 0 - 2	did not advance				
Mohamed Sarim; Hussein Zaki	Men's Doubles	Zambia; W 2 - 1	Scotland; L 0 - 2	did not advance				
Hussein Zaki; Maisa Ismail	Mixed Doubles	Northern Ireland; L 0 - 2	did not advance					
Mohamed Ajfan Rasheed; Aishath Rasheed	Mixed Doubles	Australia; L 0 - 2	did not advance					

== Shooting ==
Men

Athlete	Event	Qualification		Final	
Athlete	Event	Points	Rank	Points	Rank
Hassan Abdul Gafoor	50 metre rifle prone	606.0	25	did not advance	
Ahmed Mumthaz	50 metre rifle prone	592.8	32	did not advance	
Ibrahim Simad	50 metre rifle three positions	855.0	17	did not advance	
Ismaeel Shafeeq	25 metre rapid fire pistol	432	11	did not advance	

Women

Athlete	Event	Qualification		Semifinals		Final	
Athlete	Event	Points	Rank	Points	Rank	Points	Rank
Aminath Adheela	25 metre pistol	563	9	did not advance			
Riusha Mohamed	25 metre pistol	525	21	did not advance			

== Swimming ==
Men

Athlete	Event	Heat		Semifinal		Final	
Athlete	Event	Time	Rank	Time	Rank	Time	Rank
Mohamed Adnan	50 m freestyle	27.08	60	did not advance			
Nishwan Ibrahim	50 m freestyle	26.40	56	did not advance			
Mohamed Adnan	100 m freestyle	1:01.24	59	did not advance			
Nishwan Ibrahim	100 m freestyle	58.74	55	did not advance			
Nishwan Ibrahim	200 m freestyle	2:12.60	35	—N/a		did not advance	
Mohamed Adnan	50 m butterfly	29.46	47	did not advance			
Nishwan Ibrahim	50 m butterfly	27.79	38	did not advance			
Mohamed Adnan	100 m butterfly	1:09.76	36	did not advance			
Nishwan Ibrahim	100 m butterfly	1:05.22	34	did not advance			

Women

Athlete	Event	Heat		Semifinal		Final	
Athlete	Event	Time	Rank	Time	Rank	Time	Rank
Aminath Shajan	50 m freestyle	31.25	57	did not advance			
Aminath Shajan	100 m freestyle	1:06.60	42	did not advance			
Aminath Shajan	200 m freestyle	2:28.45	28	—N/a		did not advance	
Aishath Sajina	50 m breaststroke	40.81	35	did not advance			
Aishath Sajina	100 m breaststroke	1:27.93	38	did not advance			
Aishath Sajina	200 m breaststroke	3:19.00	25	—N/a		did not advance	
Aminath Shajan	50 m butterfly	35.00	47	did not advance			

== Table Tennis ==
Singles

Athlete	Event	Group Stage				Round of 64	Round of 32	Round of 16	Quarterfinals	Semifinals	Final	Rank
Athlete	Event	Opposition Result	Opposition Result	Opposition Result	Rank	Opposition Result	Opposition Result	Opposition Result	Opposition Result	Opposition Result	Opposition Result	Rank
Maizar Adam Zahir	Men's Singles	Abrefa (GHA); L 0 - 4	Lulu (VAN); L 0 - 4	—N/a	3	did not advance						
Moosa Ahmed	Men's Singles	Lartey (GHA); L 0 - 4	Freddy (KIR); W 4 - 2	—N/a	2	did not advance						
Zeesth Naseem	Men's Singles	Simoi (PNG); W 4 - 0	Liu (NZL); L 0 - 4	—N/a	2	did not advance						
Fathimath Jumana Nimal	Women's Singles	Lowe (GUY); L 1 - 4	Piumula (SRI); L 1 - 4	—N/a	3	did not advance						
Mueena Mohamed	Women's Singles	Gukhool (MRI); L 1 - 4	Thakkar (KEN); W 4 - 1	Lulu (VAN); L 3 - 4	2	did not advance						
Aminath Shareef	Women's Singles	Lukaaya (UGA); L 2 - 4	Ho (ENG); L 0 - 4	—N/a	3	did not advance						

Doubles

Athlete	Event	Round of 128	Round of 64	Round of 32	Round of 16	Quarterfinals	Semifinals	Final	Rank
Athlete	Event	Opposition Result	Opposition Result	Opposition Result	Opposition Result	Opposition Result	Opposition Result	Opposition Result	Rank
Moosa Ahmed; Zeesth Naseem	Men's Doubles	—N/a	Sri Lanka; L 0 - 3	did not advance					
Fathimath Jumana Nimal; Mueena Mohamed	Women's Doubles	—N/a	Papua New Guinea; W 3 - 0	Australia; L 0 - 3	did not advance				
Maizar Adam Zahir; Fathimath Jumana Nimal	Mixed Doubles	Seychelles; L 1 - 3	did not advance						
Zeesth Naseem; Aminath Shareef	Mixed Doubles	Sri Lanka; L 0 - 3	did not advance						
Moosa Ahmed; Mueena Mohamed	Mixed Doubles	Mauritius; L 2 - 3	did not advance						
