= Vanuatu at the 2010 Commonwealth Games =

- Flag of Vanuatu
- CGF code: VAN
- CGA: Vanuatu Association of Sports and National Olympic Committee
- Website: oceaniasport.com/vanuatu

in New Delhi, India
- Competitors: 6 in 1 sport
- Flag bearer: Yoshua Shing (opening)
- Medals: Gold 0 Silver 0 Bronze 0 Total 0

Commonwealth Games appearances (overview)
- 1982; 1986; 1990; 1994; 1998; 2002; 2006; 2010; 2014; 2018; 2022; 2026; 2030

Vanuatu competed in the 2010 Commonwealth Games held in Delhi, India, from 3 to 14 October 2010. Vanuatu's Table Tennis Federation has been for many years, honoured to select its players as the flag bearer of the 2010 Commonwealth games. As a result, Yoshua Shing was nominated flag bearer of the 2010 Commonwealth Games. Vanuatu participated in table tennis at the commonwealth games for singles, doubles and mixed events. The events were held at the Yamuna Sports Complex from 4 to 14 October 2010.

== Medals ==
As of end of the 2010 Commonwealth Games, participating in their eight Commonwealth Games, Vanuatuans have never yet won a medal.

Vanuatu medals by sport
Sport	1st place, gold medalist(s)	2nd place, silver medalist(s)	3rd place, bronze medalist(s)	Total
Table Tennis	0	0	0	0
Total	0	0	0	0

== Table Tennis Team ==
Vanuatu's table tennis team consisted of 6 athletes, 3 men and 3 women.

Men

- Ham Lulu
- Randy Benjamin
- Yoshua Shing

Women

- Anolyn Lulu
- Pareina Matariki
- Liopa Santhy

== See also ==
- 2010 Commonwealth Games
- 2010 Commonwealth Games medal table
- Vanuatu at the Commonwealth Games
