= Vanuatu at the 2018 Commonwealth Games =

- Flag of Vanuatu
- CG code: VAN
- CGA: Vanuatu Association of Sports and National Olympic Committee
- Website: oceaniasport.com/vanuatu

in Gold Coast, Australia 4 April 2018 – 15 April 2018
- Competitors: 18 in 4 sports
- Flag bearer: Miller Pata (opening)
- Medals Ranked 37th: Gold 0 Silver 0 Bronze 2 Total 2

Commonwealth Games appearances (overview)
- 1982; 1986; 1990; 1994; 1998; 2002; 2006; 2010; 2014; 2018; 2022; 2026; 2030

Vanuatu competed at the 2018 Commonwealth Games in the Gold Coast, Australia from April 4 to April 15, 2018.

Beach volleyball athlete Miller Pata was the island's flag bearer during the opening ceremony.

The country won its first ever Commonwealth Games medal, a bronze won by para athlete Friana Kwevira in the women's javelin throw (F46) event.

== Competitors ==
The following is the list of number of competitors participating at the Games per sport/discipline.

Sport	Men	Women	Total
Athletics	3	5	8
Beach volleyball	0	2	2
Boxing	3	0	3
Table tennis	2	3	5
Total	8	10	18

== Medalists ==
Medal	Name	Sport	Event	Date
Bronze	Friana Kwevira	Athletics	Women's Javelin Throw (F46)	April 9
Bronze	Linline Matauatu; Miller Pata	Beach volleyball	Women's tournament	April 12

Medals by sport
Sport	1st place, gold medalist(s)	2nd place, silver medalist(s)	3rd place, bronze medalist(s)	Total
Athletics	0	0	1	1
Beach volleyball	0	0	1	1
Total	0	0	2	2

Medals by day
Day	1st place, gold medalist(s)	2nd place, silver medalist(s)	3rd place, bronze medalist(s)	Total
5 April	0	0	0	0
6 April	0	0	0	0
7 April	0	0	0	0
8 April	0	0	0	0
9 April	0	0	1	1
10 April	0	0	0	0
11 April	0	0	0	0
12 April	0	0	1	1
Total	0	0	2	2

Medals by gender
Gender	1st place, gold medalist(s)	2nd place, silver medalist(s)	3rd place, bronze medalist(s)	Total
Female	0	0	2	2
Male	0	0	0	0
Mixed	0	0	0	0
Total	0	0	2	2

== Athletics ==
Vanuatu participated with 8 athletes (3 men and 5 women).

Men
Track & road events

Athlete	Event	Heat		Semifinal		Final	
Athlete	Event	Result	Rank	Result	Rank	Result	Rank
Bradly Toa	200 m	22.43	5	did not advance			
Bradly Toa	400 m	49.10	6	did not advance			
Simon Charley	10000 m	—N/a				DNS	
Simon Charley	3000 m steeplechase	—N/a				10:03.08	11

Field events

Athlete	Event	Qualification		Final	
Athlete	Event	Distance	Rank	Distance	Rank
Jack Nasawa	Javelin throw	56.12	21	did not advance	

Women
Track & road events

Athlete	Event	Heat		Semifinal		Final	
Athlete	Event	Result	Rank	Result	Rank	Result	Rank
Roslyn Nalin	100 m	13.01	7	did not advance			
Dephnny Naliupis	100 m (T35)	—N/a				26.49	7
Valentine Hello	400 m	58.62	7	did not advance			
Roslyn Nalin	400 m	1:00.72	8	did not advance			
Valentine Hello	800 m	2:18.26	9	—N/a		did not advance	

Field events

Athlete	Event	Final	
Athlete	Event	Distance	Position
Friana Kwevira	Javelin throw (F46)	24.54	3rd place, bronze medalist(s)
Marcelline Moli	Javelin throw (F46)	16.17	5

== Beach volleyball ==
Vanuatu qualified a women's beach volleyball team for a total of two athletes.

Athlete	Event	Preliminary round	Standing	Quarterfinals	Semifinals	Final / BM	
Athlete	Event	Opposition Score	Standing	Opposition Score	Opposition Score	Opposition Score	Rank
Linline Matauatu; Miller Pata	Women's	Pool C Lau – Ong (SGP); W 2 – 0 (21 - 9, 21 - 12); Nzayisenga – Mutatsimpundu (RWA); W 2 – 0 (21 - 15, 21 - 10); Wills – Polley (NZL); L 0 – 2 (17 - 21, 16 - 21)	2 Q	Grimson – Palmer (ENG); W 2 – 1 (23 - 25, 21 - 19, 15 - 12)	Artacho del Solar – Clancy (AUS); L 1 - 2 (19-21, 21-16, 9-15)	Konstantinou – Angelopoulou (CYP); W 2 - 0 (21-14, 21-10)	3rd place, bronze medalist(s)

== Boxing ==
Vanuatu participated with a team of 3 athletes (3 men).

Men

Athlete	Event	Round of 16	Quarterfinals	Semifinals	Final	Rank
Athlete	Event	Opposition Result	Opposition Result	Opposition Result	Opposition Result	Rank
Berry Namri	−49 kg	BYE	Thiwanka Ranasinghe (SRI); L 0–5	did not advance		
Gill Kalai	−52 kg	Thabo Molefe (LES); L 0–5	did not advance			
Boe Warawara	−56 kg	Hussamuddin Mohammed (IND); L 0–5	did not advance			

== Table tennis ==
Vanuatu participated with 5 athletes (2 men and 3 women).

Singles

Athletes	Event	Group Stage			Round of 64	Round of 32	Round of 16	Quarterfinal	Semifinal	Final	Rank
Athletes	Event	Opposition Score	Opposition Score	Rank	Opposition Score	Opposition Score	Opposition Score	Opposition Score	Opposition Score	Opposition Score	Rank
Ham Lulu	Men's singles	Rollins (BAH); W 4 - 0	Sirisena (SRI); L 0 - 4	2	did not advance						
Yoshua Shing	Men's singles	Melton (TUV); W 4 - 0	Wilson (TTO); L 1 - 4	2	did not advance						
Anolyn Lulu	Women's singles	Sifi (SOL); W 4 - 0	Baah-Danso (GHA); L 1 - 4	2	—N/a	did not advance					
Stephanie Qwea	Women's singles	Ho Wan Kau (MRI); L 1 - 4	Thakkar (KEN); L 1 - 4	3	—N/a	did not advance					
Priscilla Tommy	Women's singles	Katepu (TUV); W 4 - 0	Pazi (TAN); W 4 - 0	1 Q	—N/a	Lay (AUS); L 0 - 4	did not advance				

Doubles

Athletes	Event	Round of 64	Round of 32	Round of 16	Quarterfinal	Semifinal	Final	Rank
Athletes	Event	Opposition Score	Opposition Score	Opposition Score	Opposition Score	Opposition Score	Opposition Score	Rank
Ham Lulu; Yoshua Shing	Men's doubles	Bye	Asante / Sam (GHA); L 1 - 3	did not advance				
Anolyn Lulu; Priscilla Tommy	Women's doubles	—N/a	Mwaisyula / Pazi (TAN); W 3 - 0	Ho / Tsaptsinos (ENG); L 0 - 3	did not advance			
Anolyn Lulu; Yoshua Shing	Mixed doubles	Tumaini / Mwaisyula (TAN); W 3 - 1	Hu / Tapper (AUS); L 0 - 3	did not advance				
Priscilla Tommy; Ham Lulu	Mixed doubles	Britton / Greaves (GUY); L 0 - 3	did not advance					

Team

Athletes	Event	Group Stage			Quarterfinal	Semifinal	Final	Rank
Athletes	Event	Opposition Score	Opposition Score	Rank	Opposition Score	Opposition Score	Opposition Score	Rank
Anolyn Lulu; Stephanie Qwea; Priscilla Tommy	Women's team	England; L 0 - 3	Guyana; L 2 - 3	3	did not advance			

== See also ==
- Vanuatu at the 2018 Summer Youth Olympics
