= Vanuatu at the 2006 Commonwealth Games =

- CGF code: VAN
- CGA: Vanuatu Association of Sports and National Olympic Committee
- Website: oceaniasport.com/vanuatu

in Melbourne, Australia
- Medals: Gold 0 Silver 0 Bronze 0 Total 0

Commonwealth Games appearances (overview)
- 1982; 1986; 1990; 1994; 1998; 2002; 2006; 2010; 2014; 2018; 2022; 2026; 2030

Vanuatu took part in the 2006 Commonwealth Games in Melbourne.

The country's delegation, led by chef de mission Eileen Nganga, included four athletes (Moses Kamut, Abraham Kepsen, Atnold Sorina and Robert Nidithawae) in track events, six (Anolyn Lulu, Ham Lulu, Kerry Ann Mok, Gordon Mok, Yoshua Shing and Priscila Tommy) in table tennis, and one (Tom Tete) in powerlifting. Anolyn Lulu was Vanuatu's flagbearer during the opening ceremony.

== Medals ==
	(gold)	(silver)	(bronze)	Total
Vanuatu	0	0	0	0
