= 2018 Commonwealth Games medal table =

Ranking of participants by medal total

The 2018 Commonwealth Games (officially known as the XXI Commonwealth Games), was a multi-sport event held in Gold Coast, Queensland, Australia, between 4 and 15 April 2018. 275 medal events were held at these games.

Australia won the games with 78 gold, 59 silver and 59 bronze, for a total of 198 medals.

== Firsts ==
The Solomon Islands won its first Commonwealth Games medal, a bronze won by Jenly Tegu Wini in the women's 58 kg weightlifting event.

The Cook Islands won its first Commonwealth Games medal, a bronze won by Taiki Paniani and Aidan Zittersteijn in the men's pairs lawn bowls event.

Vanuatu won its first Commonwealth Games medal, a bronze won by para athlete Friana Kwevira in the women's javelin throw (F46) event.

Dominica won its first Commonwealth Games medal when Thea LaFond won a bronze medal in the women's triple jump event. A few days later, Dominica won its first ever silver medal when Yordanys Duranona Garcia came second in the men's triple jump event.

British Virgin Islands won its first Commonwealth Games medal when Kyron McMaster won a gold in the men's 400m hurdles.

Saint Lucia won its first Commonwealth Games gold medal when Levern Spencer won the women's high jump event.

== Medal table ==
The ranking in this table is consistent with the International Olympic Committee convention in its published medal tables. By default, the table is ordered by the number of gold medals the athletes from a nation have won (in this context, a "nation" is an entity represented by a Commonwealth Games Association). The number of silver medals is taken into consideration next and then the number of bronze medals. If nations are still tied, equal ranking is given and they are listed alphabetically by their three-letter country code. Australia came in first in the medal table rank with 78 gold, the second being England with 45 gold, and the third being India with 26 gold.

Two bronze medals were awarded in boxing. In four events of wrestling, only five nations entered the event, per Commonwealth Games regulations, only one bronze medal was available. No bronze medal was awarded in the women's 50 metre butterfly S7, women's powerlifting heavyweight, and women's wrestling freestyle 50 kg, as only four athletes competed in the event, and per Commonwealth Games regulations, the bronze medal was not available. At women's tandem sprint B and women's tandem 1 km time trial B only one gold medal was available, as only three nations entered the event.

Additionally, two silver medals were awarded in the men's gymnastics horizontal bar, men's 100 metre freestyle, and the women's 50 metre freestyle as a result of a tie between two athletes. Therefore, the total number of bronze medals is greater than the total number of gold or silver medals.

Key

* Host nation

Rank	CGA	Gold	Silver	Bronze	Total
1	Australia*	80	59	59	198
2	England	45	45	46	136
3	India	26	20	20	66
4	Canada	15	40	27	82
5	New Zealand	15	16	15	46
6	South Africa	13	11	13	37
7	Wales	10	12	14	36
8	Scotland	9	13	22	44
9	Nigeria	9	9	6	24
10	Cyprus	8	1	5	14
11	Jamaica	7	9	11	27
12	Malaysia	7	5	12	24
13	Singapore	5	2	2	9
14	Kenya	4	7	6	17
15	Uganda	3	1	2	6
16	Botswana	3	1	1	5
17	Samoa	2	3	0	5
18	Trinidad and Tobago	2	1	0	3
19	Namibia	2	0	0	2
20	Northern Ireland	1	7	4	12
21	Bahamas	1	3	0	4
22	Papua New Guinea	1	2	0	3
23	Fiji	1	1	2	4
24	Pakistan	1	0	4	5
25	Grenada	1	0	1	2
26	Bermuda	1	0	0	1
26	British Virgin Islands	1	0	0	1
26	Guyana	1	0	0	1
26	Saint Lucia	1	0	0	1
30	Bangladesh	0	2	0	2
31	Sri Lanka	0	1	5	6
32	Cameroon	0	1	2	3
33	Dominica	0	1	1	2
34	Isle of Man	0	1	0	1
34	Mauritius	0	1	0	1
34	Nauru	0	1	0	1
37	Malta	0	0	2	2
37	Vanuatu	0	0	2	2
39	Cook Islands	0	0	1	1
39	Ghana	0	0	1	1
39	Norfolk Island	0	0	1	1
39	Seychelles	0	0	1	1
39	Solomon Islands	0	0	1	1
Totals (43 entries)		275	276	289	840

== See also ==
- All-time Commonwealth Games medal table
- 2022 Commonwealth Games medal table
