= Vanuatu at the 2026 Commonwealth Games =

- Flag of Vanuatu
- CG code: VAN
- CGA: Vanuatu Association of Sports and National Olympic Committee
- Website: afcnovasanoc.wixsite.com/vasanoc

in Glasgow, Scotland 23 July 2026 – 2 August 2026
- Competitors: 14 in 6 sports
- Flag bearer: Ajah Pritchard-Lolo
- Baton bearer: Thomas Wilbur
- Medals: Gold 0 Silver 0 Bronze 0 Total 0

Commonwealth Games appearances (overview)
- 1982; 1986; 1990; 1994; 1998; 2002; 2006; 2010; 2014; 2018; 2022; 2026; 2030

Vanuatu competed at the 2026 Commonwealth Games in Glasgow, Scotland. This marked Vanuatu's 12th participation at the games, after making its debut at the 1982 Commonwealth Games.

The King's Baton relay stopped in Vanuatu in February 2026.

On 13 June 2026, Vanuatu announced a team of 14 athletes for the Games. Weightlifter Ajah Pritchard-Lolo was the country's opening ceremony flagbearer. Meanwhile, fellow weightlifter Thomas Wilbur was the baton bearer during the opening ceremony.

The country did not win any medals across all the events it competed in.

== Competitors ==
The following is the list of number of competitors participating at the Games per sport/discipline.

Sport		Men	Women	Total
Athletics		2	2	4
Boxing		1	0	1
Judo		1	2	3
Swimming		2	1	3
Weightlifting	Para powerlifting	1	0	1
Weightlifting	Weightlifting	1	1	2
Total		8	6	14

== Athletics ==
Vanuatu entered four athletes, two per gender.

Key

Ranks given for track events are within the athlete's heat only.

- Q = Qualified for the next round
- q = Qualified for the next round as a fastest loser or, in field events, by position without achieving the qualifying target

Athlete	Event	Heat		Semifinal		Final	
Athlete	Event	Result	Rank	Result	Rank	Result	Rank
Rizon Rara	Men's 100 m	11.13	5	Did not advance			
Rizon Rara	Men's 200 m	22.49	5	Did not advance			
Toho Joshua	Men's 100 m	10.91	6	Did not advance			
Toho Joshua	Men's 200 m	DQ		Did not advance			
Chloe David	Women's 100 m	12.67	6	Did not advance			
Chloe David	Women's 200 m	25.99	7	Did not advance			
Claudie David	Women's 100 m	12.93	6	Did not advance			

== Boxing ==
Vanuatu entered one male boxer.

Men

Athlete	Event	Round of 32	Round of 16	Quarterfinals	Semifinals	Final	
Athlete	Event	Opposition Result	Opposition Result	Opposition Result	Opposition Result	Opposition Result	Rank
Ricksen Nomleas	55 kg	Trowbridge (ENG); L RSC	Did not advance				

== Judo ==
Vanuatu entered three judoka (one man and two women).

Athlete	Event	Round of 16	Quarterfinals	Semifinals	Repechage	Final/BM	
Athlete	Event	Opposition Result	Opposition Result	Opposition Result	Opposition Result	Opposition Result	Rank
Alan Monthouel	Men's 60 kg	Zahra (MLT); W 100–001	Singh (IND); L 000–102	Did not advance	Wali (KEN); L 000–100	Did not advance	7
Priscillia Monthouel	Women's 52 kg	Hudson (WAL); L 000–100	Did not advance				
Kaina Delrieu	Women's 57 kg	Kourabi (KIR); W 100–000	Toprak (ENG); L 000–100	Did not advance	Begue (MRI); L 001–100	Did not advance	7

== Swimming ==
Vanuatu entered three swimmers, two men and one woman. For the first time at a Commonwealth Games, male swimmers represented the country.

Athlete	Event	Heat		Semifinal		Final	
Athlete	Event	Time	Rank	Time	Rank	Time	Rank
Robsen Dick	Men's 50 m freestyle	28.36	64	Did not advance			
Robsen Dick	Men's 50 m breaststroke	36.93	53	Did not advance			
Leo Lebot	Men's 50 m freestyle	25.83	55	Did not advance			
Leo Lebot	Men's 100 m freestyle	58.68	59	Did not advance			
Leo Lebot	Men's 50 m butterfly	28.67	61	Did not advance			
Loane Russet	Women's 50 m freestyle	28.11	47	Did not advance			
Loane Russet	Women's 100 m freestyle	1:03.44	56	Did not advance			
Loane Russet	Women's 50 m butterfly	32.34	49	Did not advance			

== Weightlifting ==
Vanuatu qualified two weightlifters (one per gender).

Athlete	Event	Snatch (kg)		Clean & Jerk (kg)		Total (kg)	Rank
Athlete	Event	Result	Rank	Result	Rank	Total (kg)	Rank
Thomas Wilbur	Men's 110 kg	NM		DNF			
Ajah Pritchard-Lolo	Women's 86 kg	100	5	117	7	217	7

=== Para Powerlifting ===
Vanuatu qualified one female para powerlifter.

Athlete	Event	Result	Rank
Marek Sahi	Women's heavyweight	51.1	11
