= Badminton at the 2014 Commonwealth Games – Men's singles =

Badminton – Men's singles at the 2014 Commonwealth Games
- Venue: Emirates Arena, Glasgow
- Dates: 29 July – 3 August 2014
- Competitors: 62 from 28 nations

Medalists
gold medal	Parupalli Kashyap	India
silver medal	Derek Wong	Singapore
bronze medal	Gurusai Datt	India

The men's singles badminton event at the 2014 Commonwealth Games was held from July 29 to August 3 at the Emirates Arena in Glasgow. The defending gold medalist was Lee Chong Wei of Malaysia, who won in 2006 and 2010. This year, Lee withdrew from the tournament due to an injury.

The athletes were drawn into an elimination stage draw. Once a team lost a match it was no longer able to compete. Each match was contested as the best of three games.

The draw for the competition was done on July 21, 2014.

== Seeds ==
The seeds for the tournament were:

1. Chong Wei Feng (MAS) (Quarterfinals)
2. Parupalli Kashyap (IND) (Champion, gold medalist)
3. Rajiv Ouseph (ENG) (Semifinals, fourth place)
4. Srikanth Kidambi (IND) (Quarterfinals)

5. Gurusai Datt (IND) (Semifinals, bronze medalist)
6. Derek Wong (SIN) (Final, silver medalist)
7. Liew Daren (MAS) (Quarterfinals)
8. Kieran Merrilees (SCO) (Quarterfinals)

Click on the seed number of a player to go to their draw section.

== Results ==
=== Finals ===
Quarterfinals
1	Chong Wei Feng (MAS)	15	21	17
5	Gurusai Datt (IND)	21	8	21
4	Srikanth Kidambi (IND)	10	21	12
6	Derek Wong (SIN)	21	12	21
8	Kieran Merrilees (SCO)	14	7
3	Rajiv Ouseph (ENG)	21	21
7	Liew Daren (MAS)	13	14
2	Parupalli Kashyap (IND)	21	21

Semifinals
5	Gurusai Datt (IND)	21	19	15
6	Derek Wong (SIN)	16	21	21
3	Rajiv Ouseph (ENG)	21	19	18
2	Parupalli Kashyap (IND)	17	21	21

Final
6	Derek Wong (SIN)	14	21	19
2	Parupalli Kashyap (IND)	21	11	21
Third place
5	Gurusai Datt (IND)	21	14	21
3	Rajiv Ouseph (ENG)	15	21	19

=== Top half ===
==== Section 1 ====
Round of 64
Joe Wu (NZL)	21	17
Buwaneka Dullewa (SRI)	23	21
Prakash Vijayanath (RSA)	21	21
Andre Padmore (BAR)	15	7
Tony Stephenson (NIR)	21	21
Mohammed Haque (BAN)	10	15
5	Gurusai Datt (IND)	21	21
Benjamin Li (IOM)	5	12
Edwin Ekiring (UGA)	22	21
Mohamed Ajfan Rasheed (MDV)	20	12
Ross Stewart (FAI)	5	5
Emmanuel Donkor (GHA)	21	21
Andrew D’Souza (CAN)	21	21
Patrick Mbogo (KEN)	11	10

Round of 32
1	Chong Wei Feng (MAS)	21	21
Buwaneka Dullewa (SRI)	13	10
Prakash Vijayanath (RSA)	5	8
Tony Stephenson (NIR)	21	21
5	Gurusai Datt (IND)	21	21
Edwin Ekiring (UGA)	13	11
Emmanuel Donkor (GHA)	12	16
Andrew D’Souza (CAN)	21	21

Round of 16
1	Chong Wei Feng (MAS)	21	21
Tony Stephenson (NIR)	15	10
5	Gurusai Datt (IND)	21	21
Andrew D’Souza (CAN)	13	9

Quarterfinals
1	Chong Wei Feng (MAS)	15	21	17
5	Gurusai Datt (IND)	21	8	21

==== Section 2 ====
Round of 64
4	Srikanth Kidambi (IND)	21	21
Duane March (SHN)	3	4
Gaone Tawana (BOT)	9	8
Daniel Font (WAL)	21	21
Abraham Ayittey (GHA)	6	14
Niluka Karunaratne (SRI)	21	21
Ryan Benjamin (SHN)	4	7
Nasheeu Sharafuddeen (MDV)	21	21
6	Derek Wong (SIN)	21	21
Mark Constable (JER)	7	12
Georgie Cupidon (SEY)	21	21
Michael Donohoe (NFI)	3	8
Julien Paul (MRI)	21	15	15
Gareth Henry (JAM)	17	21	21
Ngosa Chongo (ZAM)	21	21
Daniel Penney (GUE)	13	13

Round of 32
4	Srikanth Kidambi (IND)	21	21
Daniel Font (WAL)	8	13
Niluka Karunaratne (SRI)	21	21
Nasheeu Sharafuddeen (MDV)	11	4
6	Derek Wong (SIN)	21	21
Georgie Cupidon (SEY)	3	4
Gareth Henry (JAM)	21	21
Ngosa Chongo (ZAM)	16	14

Round of 16
4	Srikanth Kidambi (IND)	20	21	21
Niluka Karunaratne (SRI)	22	16	12
6	Derek Wong (SIN)	21	21
Gareth Henry (JAM)	7	7

Quarterfinals
4	Srikanth Kidambi (IND)	10	21	12
6	Derek Wong (SIN)	21	12	21

=== Bottom half ===
==== Section 3 ====
Round of 64
Stuart Hardy (GUE)	13	16
Muhammed Bhatti (PAK)	21	21
Tony Murphy (NIR)	21	21
Kervin Ghislain (SEY)	13	15
Victor Munga (KEN)	21	21
Alexander Hutchings (JER)	17	13
Richard Cribb (NFI)	4	3
8	Kieran Merrilees (SCO)	21	21
Ayman Jaman (BAN)	21	21
Wilson Tukire (UGA)	11	12
Dominic Jaffray (FAI)	4	5
Huang Chao (SIN)	21	21
Garron Palmer (JAM)	15	21	14
Sahir Edoo (MRI)	21	18	21
Chongo Mulenga (ZAM)	10	9
3	Rajiv Ouseph (ENG)	21	21

Round of 32
Muhammed Bhatti (PAK)	21	20	18
Tony Murphy (NIR)	11	22	21
Victor Munga (KEN)	6	7
8	Kieran Merrilees (SCO)	21	21
Ayman Jaman (BAN)	7	7
Huang Chao (SIN)	21	21
Sahir Edoo (MRI)	11	6
3	Rajiv Ouseph (ENG)	21	21

Round of 16
Tony Murphy (NIR)	15	8
8	Kieran Merrilees (SCO)	21	21
Huang Chao (SIN)	15	15
3	Rajiv Ouseph (ENG)	21	21

Quarterfinals
8	Kieran Merrilees (SCO)	14	7
3	Rajiv Ouseph (ENG)	21	21

==== Section 4 ====
Round of 64
Michael Fowke (NZL)	21	21
Mohamed Sarim (MDV)	9	10
Jacob Maliekal (RSA)
Dinuka Karunaratne (SRI)	w/o
Aatish Lubah (MRI)	21	17	17
Daniel Sam (GHA)	16	21	21
Lee Yon (SHN)	3	11
7	Liew Daren (MAS)	21	21
Douglas Clark (FAI)	19	14
Steve Malcouzanne (SEY)	21	21
Jeff Tho (AUS)	21	21
Joseph Githitu (KEN)	5	11
Jason Quintal (NFI)	4	4
Dakeil Thorpe (BAR)	21	21

Round of 32
Michael Fowke (NZL)	9	18
Dinuka Karunaratne (SRI)	21	21
Daniel Sam (GHA)	14	16
7	Liew Daren (MAS)	21	21
Steve Malcouzanne (SEY)	11	7
Jeff Tho (AUS)	21	21
Dakeil Thorpe (BAR)	9	5
2	Parupalli Kashyap (IND)	21	21

Round of 16
Dinuka Karunaratne (SRI)	19	12
7	Liew Daren (MAS)	21	21
Jeff Tho (AUS)	7	8
2	Parupalli Kashyap (IND)	21	21

Quarterfinals
7	Liew Daren (MAS)	13	14
2	Parupalli Kashyap (IND)	21	21
