= Sri Lanka at the 2014 Commonwealth Games =

- CG code: SRI
- CGA: National Olympic Committee of Sri Lanka
- Website: srilankaolympic.org

in Glasgow, Scotland
- Competitors: 103 in 13 sports
- Flag bearer: Sudesh Peiris
- Medals Ranked =29th: Gold 0 Silver 1 Bronze 0 Total 1

Commonwealth Games appearances (overview)
- 1938; 1950; 1954; 1958; 1962; 1966; 1970; 1974; 1978; 1982; 1986; 1990; 1994; 1998; 2002; 2006; 2010; 2014; 2018; 2022; 2026; 2030

Sri Lanka competed in the 2014 Commonwealth Games in Glasgow, Scotland from July 23 to August 3, 2014. Sri Lanka's team consists of 103 athletes in 13 sports. Nishantha Piyasena was appointed as the chef de mission of the team on June 29, 2014.

== Competitors ==
The following is the list of number of competitors participating at the Games per sport/discipline.

Sport	Men	Women	Total
Athletics	6	4	10
Badminton	4	5	9
Boxing	7	3	10
Cycling	3	2	5
Gymnastics	2	3	5
Judo	2	1	3
Rugby sevens	12	0	12
Shooting	6	5	11
Squash	3	3	6
Swimming	4	2	6
Table tennis	4	4	8
Weightlifting	10	1	11
Wrestling	7	0	7
Total	70	33	103

== Medalists ==
Medal	Name	Sport	Event	Date
Silver	Sudesh Peiris	Weightlifting	Men's 62 kg	July 25

Medals by sport
Sport	1st place, gold medalist(s)	2nd place, silver medalist(s)	3rd place, bronze medalist(s)	Total
Weightlifting	0	1	0	1
Total	0	1	0	1

== Athletics ==
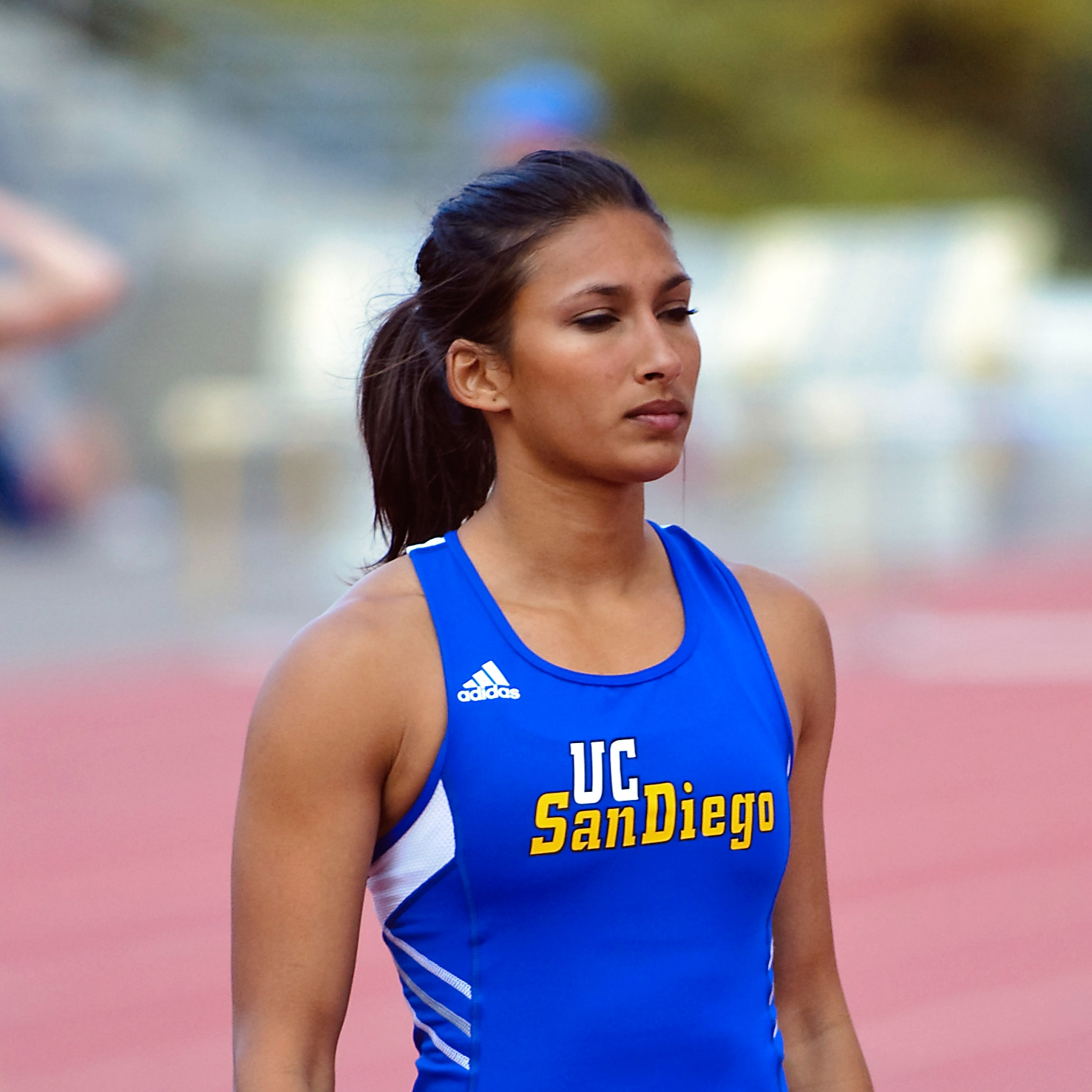
Christine Merrill represented the country in two events.

Sri Lanka's athletics team consists of ten athletes.

Key

- Note– Ranks given for track events are for the entire round
- Q = Qualified for the next round
- q = Qualified for the next round as a fastest loser or, in field events, by position without achieving the qualifying target
- NR = National record
- N/A = Round not applicable for the event
- Bye = Athlete not required to compete in round

Men

Athlete	Event	Round 1		Semifinal		Final	
Athlete	Event	Result	Rank	Result	Rank	Result	Rank
Chanaka Jayasekera; Anjana Gunaratne; Nalin Karunarathna; Kasun Senevirathna; Kalinga Kumarage*	4 x 400 metres relay	3:08.10	9	—N/a		Did not advance	

Field events

Athlete	Event	Final	
Athlete	Event	Distance	Position
Wesly Arachchige	Discus throw (F42/44)	36.74	9
Chandrasena Mapatunage	Discus throw (F42/44)	34.81	10

Women

Athlete	Event	Round 1		Semifinal		Final	
Athlete	Event	Result	Rank	Result	Rank	Result	Rank
Christine Merrill	400 metres hurdles	58.65	14	—N/a		Did not advance	
Chandrika Subashini	400 m	53.75	14 Q	52.67	13	Did not advance	
Nimali Arachchige	800 m	2:08.31	23	—N/a		Did not advance	

Field events

Athlete	Event	Final	
Athlete	Event	Distance	Position
Nadeeka Lakmali	Javelin throw	59.04	6

* Did not race.

== Badminton ==
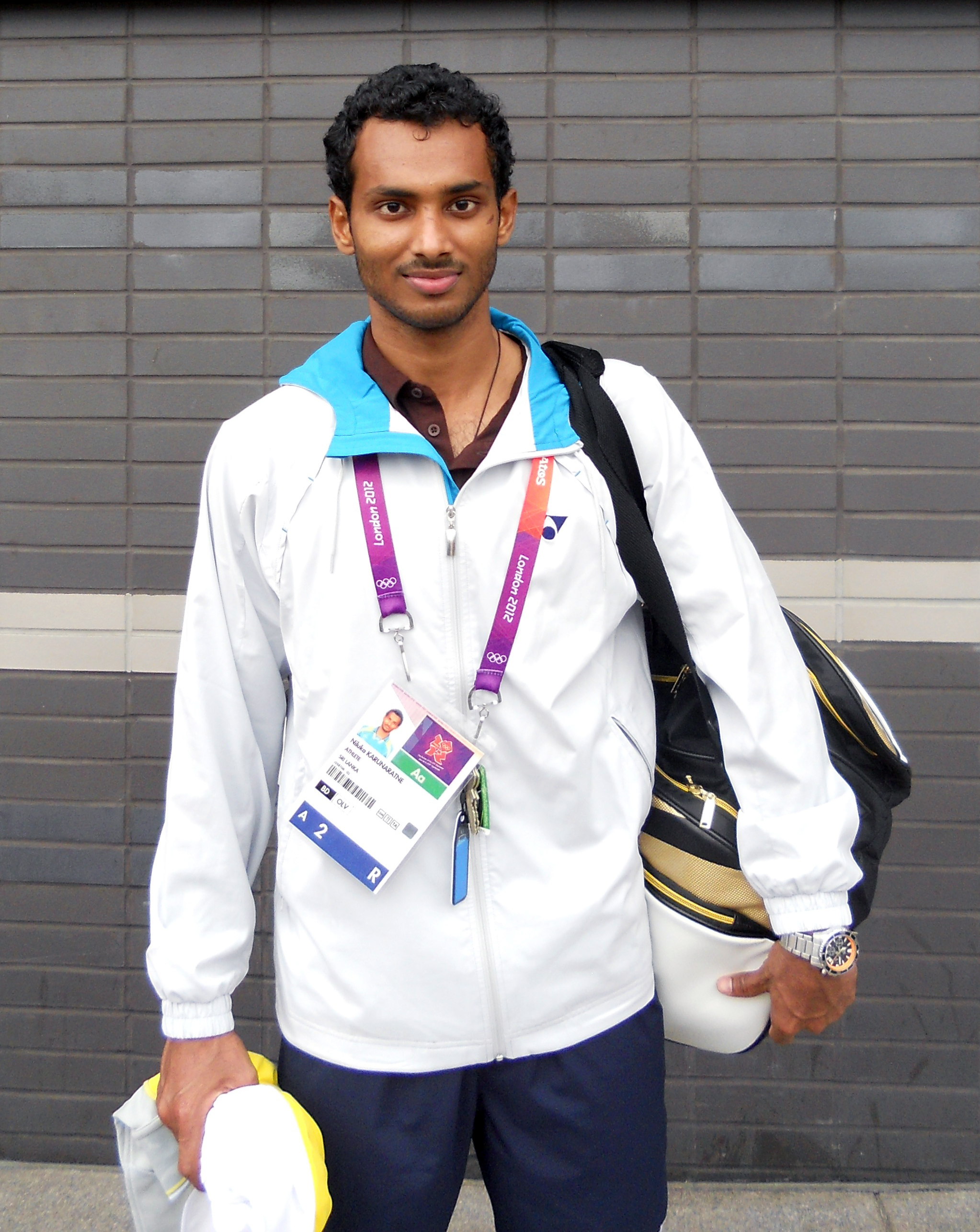
Niluka Karunaratne, pictured here at the 2012 Summer Olympics represented Sri Lanka in the men's singles event.

Sri Lanka's badminton team consisted of nine athletes.

Individual

Athlete	Event	Round of 64	Round of 32	Round of 16	Quarterfinals	Semifinals	Final	
Athlete	Event	Opposition Score	Opposition Score	Opposition Score	Opposition Score	Opposition Score	Opposition Score	Rank
Dinuka Karunaratne	Men's Singles	Maliekal (RSA); W W/O	Fowke (NZL); W 21–9, 21–18	Liew (MAS); L 19–21, 12–21	Did not advance			
Niluka Karunaratne	Men's Singles	Ayittey (GHA); W 21–6, 21–14	Sharafuddeen (MDV); W 21–11, 21–4	Kidambi (IND); L 22–20, 16–21, 12–21	Did not advance			
Buwenaka Dullewa	Men's Singles	Wu (NZL); W 23–21, 21–17	Wei Feng (MAS); L 13–21, 10–21	Did not advance				
Achini Rathnasiri	Women's Singles	Rasheed (MDV); W 21–11, 21–12	Chan (NZL); L 21–17, 7–21, 12–21	Did not advance				
Thilini Hendahewa	Women's Singles	Bye	Gray (NFI); W 21–3, 21–1	Sindhu (IND); L 14–21, 14–21	Did not advance			
Nadeesha Murukkuwadura	Women's Singles	Bye	Henry (JAM); W 21–10, 21–14	Jing Yi (MAS); L 9–21, 6–21	Did not advance			

Doubles

Athlete	Event	Round of 64	Round of 32	Round of 16	Quarterfinals	Semifinals	Final	
Athlete	Event	Opposition Score	Opposition Score	Opposition Score	Opposition Score	Opposition Score	Opposition Score	Rank
Sachin Dias; Buwenaka Dullewa	Men's Doubles	Bye	Dewalkar / Chopra (IND); L 10–21, 9–21	Did not advance				
Madushika Beruwelage; Nadeesha Murukkuwadura	Women's Doubles	—N/a	Eastmond / Watson (BAR); W 21–5, 21–13	Fry / Le Grange (RSA); L 12–21, 21–15, 17–21	Did not advance			
Achini Rathnasiri; Upuli Weerasinghe	Women's Doubles	—N/a	Williams / Minto (FAI); W 21–6, 21–5	Stapleton / Rankin (NZL); W 22–20, 18–21, 21–19	Ponnappa / Gutta (IND); L 10–21, 9–21	Did not advance		
Sachin Dias; Upuli Weerasinghe	Mixed Doubles	Triyachart / Yao (SIN); L 12–21, 15–21	Did not advance					
Buwenaka Dullewa; Madushika Beruwelage	Mixed Doubles	Tukire / Nankabirwa (UGA); W 21–10, 21–6	Bhatti / Bashir (PAK); W 22–20, 17–21, 21–15	Soon Chan / Pei Jing (MAS); L 13–21, 15–21	Did not advance			

Mixed team

Pool A

Pos	Team	Pld	W	L	GF	GA	GD	PF	PA	PD	Pts	Qualification
1	Malaysia	2	2	0	20	0	+20	420	202	+218	2	Quarterfinals
2	Sri Lanka	2	1	1	10	10	0	342	292	+50	1	Quarterfinals
3	Barbados	2	0	2	0	20	−20	152	420	−268	0	

Source: glasgow2014.com

Sri Lanka
5
Commonwealth Arena, Glasgow
25 July

Barbados
0

			1	2	3
1	(Sri Lanka) (Barbados)	Niluka Karunaratne / Thilini Hendahewa; Shari Watson / Dakeil Thorpe	21; 9	21; 4
2	(Sri Lanka) (Barbados)	Dinuka Karunaratne; Andre Padmore	21; 8	21; 7
3	(Sri Lanka) (Barbados)	Thilini Hendahewa; Mariama Eastmond	21; 11	21; 9
4	(Sri Lanka) (Barbados)	Niluka Karunaratne / Dinuka Karunaratne; Mariama Eastmond / Dakeil Thorpe	21; 5	21; 7
5	(Sri Lanka) (Barbados)	Achini Rathnasiri / Upuli Weerasinghe; Mariama Eastmond / Shari Watson	21; 12	21; 10

Malaysia
5
Commonwealth Arena, Glasgow
26 July

Sri Lanka
0

			1	2	3
1	(Malaysia) (Sri Lanka)	Liew Daren; Niluka Karunaratne	21; 17	21; 12
2	(Malaysia) (Sri Lanka)	Tee Jing Yi; Thilini Hendahewa	21; 14	21; 6
3	(Malaysia) (Sri Lanka)	Tan Wee Kiong / Goh V Shem; Niluka Karunaratne / Dinuka Karunaratna	21; 17	21; 19
4	(Malaysia) (Sri Lanka)	Lim Yin Loo / Vivian Hoon; Achini Rathnasiri / Upuli Weerasinghe	21; 11	21; 8
5	(Malaysia) (Sri Lanka)	Chan Peng Soon / Lai Pei Jing; Dinuka Karunaratna / Thilini Hendahewa	21; 14	21; 14

Quarterfinals

Sri Lanka
0
Commonwealth Arena, Glasgow
26 July

England
3

			1	2	3
1	(Sri Lanka) (England)	Dinuka Karunaratna / Thilini Hendahewa; Chris Adcock / Gabby Adcock	13; 21	10; 21
2	(Sri Lanka) (England)	Niluka Karunaratne; Rajiv Ouseph	15; 21	16; 21
3	(Sri Lanka) (England)	Thilini Hendahewa; Sarah Walker	14; 21	14; 21

== Boxing ==
Sri Lanka's boxing team consists of ten athletes.

Men

Athlete	Event	Round of 32	Round of 16	Quarterfinals	Semifinals	Final	
Athlete	Event	Opposition Result	Opposition Result	Opposition Result	Opposition Result	Opposition Result	Rank
Madushan Gamage	Light flyweight	Singh (IND); L 0–3	Did not advance				
Anurudha Rathnayake	Flyweight	Bye	Semitala (UGA); W 3–0	Omar (GHA); L 1–2	Did not advance		
Manju Wanniarachchi	Bantamweight	Sonjica (RSA); L 0–3	Did not advance				
Dinindu Saparamadu	Lightweight	Mohlerepe (LES); L 0–3	Did not advance				
Dilshan Mohamed	Light welterweight	Duffy (NIR); L 0–3	Did not advance				
Maduranga Pathirage Don	Welterweight	Aisaga (PNG); W 3–0	Bancroft (GUY); L 1–2	Did not advance			
Senanga Nawarathna	Middleweight	Lucas (AUS); L 0–3	Did not advance				

Women

Athlete	Event	Round of 16	Quarterfinals	Semifinals	Final	Rank
Athlete	Event	Opposition Result	Opposition Result	Opposition Result	Opposition Result	Rank
Erandi De Silva	Flyweight	Bye	Adams (ENG); L 0–3	Did not advance		
Hansika Arachchi	Lightweight	Jones (WAL); L 0–3	Did not advance			
Shiromali Weerarathna	Middleweight	Mothibeli (LES); W TKO	Ogoke (NGR); L 0–3	Did not advance		

== Cycling ==
Sri Lanka's cycling team consists of four athletes.

=== Road ===
Athlete	Event	Time	Rank
Jeevan Jayasinghe	Men's road race	DNF	
Buddhika Warnakulasooriya	Men's road race	1:00:02.52	42
Buddhika Warnakulasooriya	Men's time trial	DNF	
Dinesha Adikari	Women's road race	DNF	
Sriyalatha Wicramasinghe	Women's road race	54:33.67	30
Sriyalatha Wicramasinghe	Women's time trial	DNF	

== Gymnastics ==
5 gymnasts competed for Sri Lanka.

=== Artistic ===
Men

Athlete	Event	Final							
Athlete	Event	Apparatus						Total	Rank
Athlete	Event	F	V	PH	R	PB	HB	Total	Rank
Dilshan Appuhamilage Don	Men's qualification	11.391	12.500	10.700	5.530	11.566	11.066	62.573	31
Tharindu Paththapperuma	Men's qualification	12.100	12.533	10.966	9.700	11.566	11.333	68.198	29

Women

Athlete	Event	Final					
Athlete	Event	Apparatus				Total	Rank
Athlete	Event	V	UB	BB	F	Total	Rank
Tilanka Abayagunawardana	Team	12.733	6.433	8.033	8.733	Did not advance	
Ridma Bengalage	Team	12.443	6.600	8.733	9.766	Did not advance	
Sachini Koswaththa Liyana	Team	12.633	6.700	8.933	8.400	Did not advance	
Total	Team	37.799	19.733	25.699	26.899	110.130	13

== Judo ==
Sri Lanka has entered three judokas.

Athlete	Event	Round of 32	Round of 16	Quarterfinal	Semifinal	Repechage 1	Final / BM	
Athlete	Event	Opposition Result	Opposition Result	Opposition Result	Opposition Result	Opposition Result	Opposition Result	Rank
Chamara Repiyallage	Men's −73 kg	Rouvoune (VAN); W 1110-0000	Bensted (AUS); L 0000-1000	Did not advance				
Jeewantha Wickramage	Men's −90 kg	—N/a	Mtawa (TAN); W 0113-0000	Dill-Russell (AUS); L 0002-1000	Did not advance	Burns (SCO); L 0001-1000	Did not advance	7
Sachini Widanalage	Women's +78 kg	—N/a	—N/a	Ratugi (KEN); L 0000-1011	Did not advance	Bye	Laprovidence (MRI); L 0000-1000	5

== Rugby sevens ==
Sri Lanka has qualified a rugby sevens team. The roster of 12 is:

Roster

- Dinusha Chathuranga
- Richard Dharmapala
- Shenal Dias
- Mithun Hapugoda
- Sandun Herath
- Fazil Marija
- Sudharshana Muthuthantri
- Shehan Pathirana
- Lavanga Perera
- Danushka Ranjan
- Srinath Sooriyabandara
- Anuruddha Wilwara

Pool D

Team	Pld	W	D	L	PF	PA	PD	Pts	Qualification
Australia	3	3	0	0	120	19	+101	9	Medal competition
England	3	2	0	1	104	15	+89	7	Medal competition
Uganda	3	1	0	2	22	97	−75	5	Bowl competition
Sri Lanka	3	0	0	3	21	136	−115	3	Bowl competition

26 July 2014
10:54

Australia	62–7	Sri Lanka
	Report

Ibrox Stadium, Glasgow

26 July 2014
13:34

England	57–0	Sri Lanka
	Report

Ibrox Stadium, Glasgow

26 July 2014
20:42

Sri Lanka	14–17	Uganda
	Report

Ibrox Stadium, Glasgow

Bowl

27 July 2014
11:16

Papua New Guinea	17–12	Sri Lanka
	Report

Ibrox Stadium, Glasgow

Shield
Semifinals

27 July 2014
13:56

Sri Lanka	34–0	Barbados
	Report

Ibrox Stadium, Glasgow

Final

27 July 2014
19:42

Trinidad and Tobago	7–43	Sri Lanka
	Report

Ibrox Stadium, Glasgow

Finished in 13th place

== Shooting ==
Sri Lanka's shooting team consists of six male and five female athletes.

Men

Athlete	Event	Qualification		Final	
Athlete	Event	Points	Rank	Points	Rank
Suranga Fernando	10 metre air pistol	567	10	Did not advance	
Krishantha Kodikara	50 metre rifle prone	602.0	29	Did not advance	
Krishantha Kodikara	50 metre rifle three positions	1093	14	Did not advance	
Prasad Perera	50 metre rifle prone	600.1	30	Did not advance	
Mangala Samarakoon	10 metre air rifle	589.7	18	Did not advance	
Mangala Samarakoon	50 metre rifle three positions	1110	11	Did not advance	
Edirisinghe Senanayake	10 metre air pistol	550	22	Did not advance	
Chandana Siriwardana	10 metre air rifle	595.5	17	Did not advance	

Women

Athlete	Event	Qualification		Final	
Athlete	Event	Points	Rank	Points	Rank
Ruwini Abeymanna	10 metre air pistol	364	19	Did not advance	
Ruwini Abeymanna	25 metre pistol	560	11	Did not advance	
Tehani Egodawela	50 metre rifle prone	—N/a		599.3	22
Tehani Egodawela	50 metre rifle three positions	554	17	Did not advance	
Madushani Gamage	10 metre air rifle	401.2	22	Did not advance	
Madushani Gamage	50 metre rifle prone	—N/a		591.5	27
Madushani Gamage	50 metre rifle three positions	540	21	Did not advance	
Amali Kulatunga	10 metre air pistol	354	22	Did not advance	
Amali Kulatunga	25 metre pistol	534	20	Did not advance	
Praneetta Vasudevan	10 metre air rifle	404.3	18	Did not advance	

== Squash ==
Sri Lanka's squash team consists of six athletes.

Individual

Athlete	Event	Round of 128	Round of 64	Round of 32	Round of 16	Quarterfinals	Semifinals	Final
Athlete	Event	Opposition Score	Opposition Score	Opposition Score	Opposition Score	Opposition Score	Opposition Score	Opposition Score
Dilshan Gunawardena	Men's Singles	Bye	Walker (BOT); L 5–11, 4–11, 2–11	Did not advance				
Ravindu Laksiri	Men's Singles	Bye	Ramasra (TRI); L 9–11, 6-11, 11–8, 11–6, 6-11	Did not advance				
Gihan Suwaris	Men's Singles	Bye	Knight (NZL); L 0–11, 6–11, 3–11	Did not advance				
Naduni Gunawardane	Women's Singles	—N/a	Knaggs (TRI); L 0–11, 12–10, 9-11, 9-11	Did not advance				
Mihiliya Methsarani	Women's Singles	—N/a	Sultana (MLT); W 9–11, 10–12, 13–11, 11–9, 11–2	Grinham (AUS); L 6–11, 3–11, 1-11	Did not advance			
Nadindi Udangawa	Women's Singles	—N/a	Alphonse (SEY); W 11–1, 11–1, 11–3	Brown (AUS); L 3–11, 6–11, 3-11	Did not advance			

Doubles

Athlete	Event	Group stage				Quarterfinal	Semifinal	Final	
Athlete	Event	Opposition Score	Opposition Score	Opposition Score	Rank	Opposition Score	Opposition Score	Opposition Score	Rank
Dilshan Gunawardena; Gihan Suwaris	Men's doubles	Alexander / Cuskelly (AUS); L 3–11, 4–11	Gray / Graham (NFI); W 10–11, 11–10, 11–3	Beddoes / Coll (NZL); L 8–11, 0–11	3	Did not advance			
Mihiliya Methsarani; Nadindi Udangawa	Women's doubles	Chinappa / Pallikal (IND); L 3–11, 4–11	Craig / Lindsay (NZL); L 4–11, 1–11	David / Wern (MAS); L 2–11, 2–11	4	Did not advance			
Naduni Gunawardane; Ravindu Laksiri	Mixed doubles	Ghosal / Pallikal (IND); L 3–11, 4–11	Delierre / Cornett (CAN); L 0–11, 9–11	—N/a	3	Did not advance			

== Swimming ==
Sri Lanka's swimming team consists of five athletes.

Men

Athlete	Event	Heat		Semifinal		Final	
Athlete	Event	Time	Rank	Time	Rank	Time	Rank
M.Gokhul Shankar	50 m freestyle	21.34	=1	Did not advance			
Cherantha de Silva	100 m freestyle	55.08	=38	Did not advance			
Heshan Unamboowe	50 m backstroke	27.86	21	Did not advance			
Heshan Unamboowe	100 m backstroke	58.76	18	Did not advance			
Cherantha de Silva	50 m butterfly	25.86	24	Did not advance			
Cherantha de Silva	100 m butterfly	59.25	25	Did not advance			
Amila Kumarasiri	200 metre individual medley SM8	3:22.11	5 Q	—N/a		3:17.10	5

Women

Athlete	Event	Heat		Semifinal		Final	
Athlete	Event	Time	Rank	Time	Rank	Time	Rank
Nadeera Jayasekera	50 m backstroke	32.31	22	Did not advance			
Kimiko Raheem	50 m backstroke	31.14	16 Q	31.11	15	Did not advance	
Kimiko Raheem	100 m backstroke	1:06.36	15 Q	1:06.33	16	Did not advance	
Kimiko Raheem	200 m backstroke	2:24.63	12	—N/a		Did not advance	
Nadeera Jayasekera	50 m breaststroke	36.52	31	Did not advance			
Nadeera Jayasekera	50 m butterfly	32.05	45	Did not advance			
Kimiko Raheem	50 m butterfly	30.44	34	Did not advance			

== Table tennis ==
Sri Lanka's table tennis team consists of eight athletes.

Individual

Athlete	Event	Group stage			Round of 64	Round of 32	Round of 16	Quarterfinal	Semifinal	Final/Bronze medal	
Athlete	Event	Opposition Score	Opposition Score	Rank	Opposition Score	Opposition Score	Opposition Score	Opposition Score	Opposition Score	Opposition Score	Rank
Dinesh Deshapriya	Men's singles	Lewis (GUY); W 4–1	Cordue (NZL); W 4–1	1 Q	Howieson (SCO); L 0–4	Did not advance					
Udaya Ranasinghe	Men's singles	Beia (KIR); W 4–0	Laurence (SEY); W 4–0	1 Q	Ho (CAN); L 2–4	Did not advance					
Rohan Sirisena	Men's singles	Dyer (DMA); W 4–0	Lake (SKN); W 4–0	1 Q	Tomlinson (JAM); W 4–1	Hu (SIN); L 0–4	Did not advance				
Ishara Madurangi	Women's singles	Natunga (UGA); W 4–0	Abel (VAN); W 4–0	1 Q	Patkar (IND); L 0–4	Did not advance					
Hansi Piumila	Women's singles	Jumana Nimal (MDV); W 4–1	Lowe (GUY); L 0–4	2	Did not advance						
Erandi Warusawithana	Women's singles	Mohamed (TAN); W 4–1	Khim Ng (MAS); L 2–4	2	Did not advance						

Doubles

Athlete	Event	Round of 64	Round of 32	Round of 16	Quarterfinal	Semifinal	Final/Bronze medal	
Athlete	Event	Opposition Score	Opposition Score	Opposition Score	Opposition Score	Opposition Score	Opposition Score	Rank
Dinesh Deshapriya; Rohan Sirisena	Men's doubles	—N/a	Rumgay / Howieson (SCO); L 2–3	Did not advance				
Udaya Ranasinghe; Nirmala Jayasinghe	Men's doubles	—N/a	Henzell / Powell (AUS); W 1–3	Did not advance				
Ishara Madurangi; Erandi Warusawithana	Women's doubles	—N/a	Edghill / Lowe (GUY); W 3–2	Drinkhall / Sibley (ENG); L 0–3	Did not advance			
Chamathsara Fernando; Hansi Piumila	Women's doubles	—N/a	Loveridge / Morgan (GUE); L 1–3	Did not advance				
Rohan Sirisena; Ishara Madurangi	Mixed doubles	Whitaker / Doherty (SCO); W 3–0	Miao / Henzell (AUS); L 2–3	Did not advance				
Nirmala Jayasinghe; Chamathsara Fernando	Mixed doubles	Li / Chew (SIN); L 0–3	Did not advance					
Udaya Ranasinghe; Erandi Warusawithana	Mixed doubles	Feng Leong / Ying (MAS); L 0–3	Did not advance					
Dinesh Deshapriya; Hansi Piumila	Mixed doubles	Chung / St.Louis (TRI); L 2–3	Did not advance					

Team

Athlete	Event	Group stage				Quarterfinal	Semifinal	Final/Bronze medal	
Athlete	Event	Opposition Score	Opposition Score	Opposition Score	Rank	Opposition Score	Opposition Score	Opposition Score	Rank
Rohan Sirisena; Udaya Ranasinghe; Dinesh Deshapriya; Nirmala Jayasinghe	Men's team	Seychelles; W 3–0	Singapore; L 0–3	Ghana; W 3–1	=2	Did not advance			
Ishara Madurangi; Hansi Piumila; Chamathsara Fernando; Erandi Warusawithana	Women's team	Singapore; L 0–3	Northern Ireland; W 3–1	—N/a	2	Did not advance			

== Weightlifting ==
Sri Lanka's weightlifting team consists of nine athletes.

Men

Athlete	Event	Snatch		Clean & jerk		Total	Rank
Athlete	Event	Result	Rank	Result	Rank	Total	Rank
Sangeeth Sirisenage	−56 kg	100	8	–	–	Did not finish	
Thilanka Palangasinghe	−56 kg	105	6	–	–	Did not finish	
Sudesh Peiris	−62 kg	123	2	150	3	273	2nd place, silver medalist(s)
Indika Dissanayake	−62 kg	120	5	–	–	Did not finish	
Chinthana Vidanage	−69 kg	–	–	Did not finish			
Nawendhra Dayan	−77 kg	115	14	145	18	260	14
Romesh Ranathunga	−85 kg	126	10	165	10	291	10
Shamaka Peters	−94 kg	125	10	170	10	295	10

Women

Athlete	Event	Snatch		Clean & jerk		Total	Rank
Athlete	Event	Result	Rank	Result	Rank	Total	Rank
Chamari Warnakulasuriya	−48 kg	–	–	Did not finish			

=== Powerlifting ===
Men

Athlete	Event	Result	Rank
Wasana Perera	-72kg	145.4	9
Jayasinha Rathnayaka Mudiyanselage	-72kg	132.5	11

== Wrestling ==
Sri Lanka's wrestling team consists of seven athletes.

Key:

- VT - Victory by Fall.
- PP - Decision by Points - the loser with technical points.
- PO - Decision by Points - the loser without technical points.

Men's freestyle

Athlete	Event	Round of 32	Round of 16	Quarterfinal	Semifinal	Repechage	Final / BM	
Athlete	Event	Opposition Result	Opposition Result	Opposition Result	Opposition Result	Opposition Result	Opposition Result	Rank
Gayan Kathurangana	−57 kg	—N/a	Hussain (PAK); L 4–0 ^{PO}	Did not advance				
Udara Fernando	−61 kg	—N/a	Plaatjies (RSA); L 4–0 ^{PO}	Did not advance				
Chamara Perera	−65 kg	—N/a	Rogers (SLE); W 5–0 ^{VT}	Miller (NZL); W 4–1 ^{PP}	Dutt (IND); L 0–5 ^{VT}	—N/a	Gladkov (SCO); L 1–3 ^{PP}	5
Kushan Sandrage	−74 kg	Bye	Emilie (MRI); W 5–0 ^{VT}	Kumar (IND); L 4–0 ^{PO}	Did not advance	Lawrence (AUS); L 0–5 ^{VT}	Did not advance	
Lasantha Ekanayaka	−86 kg	—N/a	Inam (PAK); 1–4 ^{PP}	Did not advance				
Manjula Arachchige	−97 kg	—N/a	Kadian (IND); L 4–0 ^{PO}	Did not advance		Tamarau (NGR); L 0–5 ^{VT}	Did not advance	
Kalum Moraandage	−125 kg	—N/a	Bye	Carney (NZL); L 4–0 ^{PO}	Did not advance			
