= Friana Kwevira =

Vanuatuan Paralympic athlete

Personal information
- Born: 27 May 1998 (age 28) Nduindui, Vanuatu

Sport
- Country: Vanuatu
- Sport: Javelin throw
- Disability class: F46
Medal record
Women's Paralympic athletics
Representing Vanuatu
Commonwealth Games
Bronze medal – third place	2018 Gold Coast	Javelin throw (F46)

Friana Kwevira (born 27 May 1998) is a Vanuatuan female Paralympic right arm amputated javelin thrower. She represented Vanuatu at the 2018 Commonwealth Games which is also her first Paralympic related event.

She claimed Vanuatu's first ever Commonwealth Games medal at the Gold Coast Commonwealth Games by clinching an historical bronze medal in the women's javelin throw event with achieving a distance of 26.49m. With this medal achievement, Vanuatu joined two other Pacific nations including Cook Islands and the Solomon Islands for winning their maiden Commonwealth Games medals respectively as the nations ended their medal drought at the 2018 Commonwealth Games.
