= Athletics at the 2018 Commonwealth Games – Women's javelin throw (F46) =

Women's javelin throw (F46) at the 2018 Commonwealth Games
- Venue: Carrara Stadium
- Dates: 9 April
- Competitors: 5 from 4 nations
- Winning distance: 44.43 m WR

Medalists
gold medal	Hollie Arnold	Wales
silver medal	Holly Robinson	New Zealand
bronze medal	Friana Kwevira	Vanuatu

The women's javelin throw (F46) at the 2018 Commonwealth Games, as part of the athletics programme, took place in the Carrara Stadium on 9 April 2018. The event was open to para-sport athletes competing under the F46 classification.

== Records ==
Prior to this competition, the existing world record was as follows:

World record	Hollie Arnold (GBR)	43.02 m	London, United Kingdom	15 July 2017

== Schedule ==
The schedule was as follows:

Date	Time	Round
Monday 9 April 2018	19:05	Final

All times are Australian Eastern Standard Time (UTC+10)

== Results ==
With five entrants, the event was held as a straight final.

=== Final ===
Rank	Name	Sport Class	#1	#2	#3	#4	#5	#6	Result	Notes
1st place, gold medalist(s)	Hollie Arnold (WAL)	F46	37.71	41.74	41.94	40.06	42.40	44.43	44.43	WR
2nd place, silver medalist(s)	Holly Robinson (NZL)	F46	43.32	40.62	40.41	40.81	42.61	41.12	43.32	AR
3rd place, bronze medalist(s)	Friana Kwevira (VAN)	F46	x	x	x	24.54	20.57	21.97	24.54	
4	Goodness Chinasa Duru (NGR)	F46	20.84	22.11	x	19.76	x	20.35	22.11	
5	Marcelline Moli (VAN)	F46	x	13.79	x	x	16.17	13.55	16.17	PB
