= Ziyu Zhang =

Australian table tennis player

Ziyu "Sally" Zhang (born 10 December 1990) is an Australian table tennis player. She competed at the 2016 Summer Olympics as part of the Australian team in the women's team event.
