= Mueena Mohamed =

Maldivian retired table tennis player (born 1982)

Personal information
- Full name: Mueena Mohamed
- Nationality: Maldives
- Born: 22 May 1982 (age 44) Malé, Maldives

Sport
- Sport: Table tennis
- Playing style: Right-handed, Shakehand grip
- Highest ranking: 566 (February 2016)
Medal record
Women's table tennis
Representing Maldives
Indian Ocean Island Games
Gold medal – first place	2019 Mauritius	Team
Silver medal – second place	2019 Mauritius	Doubles
Silver medal – second place	2011 Seychelles	Singles
Bronze medal – third place	2015 Réunion	Singles
Bronze medal – third place	2015 Réunion	Team

Mueena Mohamed (Dhivehi: މުޢީނާ މުޙައްމަދު; born 22 May 1982) is a Maldivian retired table tennis player.

She is currently a fitness coach for the national men's, women’s and the youth football teams.

== Career records ==
(as of July 28, 2019)

National Singles 15 times Champion ( 13 consecutive time )

- Indian Ocean Island Games: singles silver medalist (2011); doubles and team event bronze medalist (2015), doubles silver medalist and team event gold medalsit (2019)
- Association Championship: winner (16 times)

Women's doubles

- Indian Ocean Island Games: runner-up (2019)
- Association Championship: winner (12 times)

Mixed doubles

- Association Championship: winner (7 times)
