= Yoshua Shing =

Vanuatuan table tennis player

Personal information
- Nationality: Vanuatu
- Born: 20 June 1993 (age 33) Port Vila, Vanuatu
- Height: 173 cm (5 ft 8 in)
- Weight: 65 kg (143 lb)

Sport
- Sport: Table Tennis
Medal record
Men's Table tennis
Representing Vanuatu
Pacific Games
Silver medal – second place	2011 Nouméa	Mixed Doubles
Silver medal – second place	2015 Port Moresby	Singles
Bronze medal – third place	2007 Apia	Mixed Doubles
Bronze medal – third place	2015 Port Moresby	Team
- Updated on 24 August 2016

Yoshua Shing (born 20 June 1993 in Port Vila) is a Vanuatuan table tennis player. He competed at the 2012 Summer Olympics and 2016 Summer Olympics in the men's singles, but was defeated in the preliminary round in both competitions. He was the flagbearer for Vanuatu at the 2016 opening ceremony. He competed at the 2020 Summer Olympics, in Men's singles.

He competed in the 2018 Commonwealth Games.

In 2020, he participated in Pacific Unite: Saving Lives Together.

Olympic Games
Preceded by Anolyn Lulu	Flagbearer for Vanuatu; Rio 2016	Succeeded by Rio Rii
