= Vanuatu at the 2002 Commonwealth Games =

Sporting event delegation

Flag of Vanuatu

Vanuatu competed in the Commonwealth Games for the sixth time, once again failing to win any medals. The country was represented by three athletes (Moses Kamut, Robert Nidithawaea and Jimmy Sandy), who all competed in track athletics events. Sandy was Vanuatu's flagbearer during the Games' opening ceremony.

== Medals ==
	Gold	Silver	Bronze	Total
Vanuatu	0	0	0	0
