= Seychelles at the 2014 Commonwealth Games =

- Flag of Seychelles
- CGF code: SEY
- CGA: Seychelles Olympic and Commonwealth Games Association

in Glasgow, Scotland
- Flag bearer: Clementina Agricole
- Medals: Gold 0 Silver 0 Bronze 0 Total 0

Commonwealth Games appearances (overview)
- 1990; 1994; 1998; 2002; 2006; 2010; 2014; 2018; 2022; 2026; 2030

Seychelles competed in the 2014 Commonwealth Games in Glasgow, Scotland from 23 July to 3 August 2014.

== Athletics ==
Men

Athlete	Event	Round 1		Semifinal		Final	
Athlete	Event	Result	Rank	Result	Rank	Result	Rank
Leroy Henriette	100 m	11.12	8	Did not advance			
Neddy Marie	100 m	11.14	6	Did not advance			
Andy Labrosse	100 m (T37)	18.76 PB	7	—N/a		Did not advance	
Jean-paul Juliette	100 m (T37)	24.03 PB	6	—N/a		Did not advance	
Leroy Henriette	200 m	21.75 SB	5	Did not advance			
Neddy Marie	200 m	21.78 PB	4	Did not advance			

Athlete	Event	Qualification		Final	
Athlete	Event	Distance	Rank	Distance	Rank
Dean William	Shot put	12.89	19	Did not advance	
Dean William	Discus throw	42.44 PB	17	Did not advance	
Dean William	Hammer throw	47.18	20	Did not advance	

Women

Athlete	Event	Round 1		Semifinal		Final	
Athlete	Event	Result	Rank	Result	Rank	Result	Rank
Joanne Loutoy	100 m	12.16	7	Did not advance			
Joanne Loutoy	200 m	25.85	6	Did not advance			

Athlete	Event	Qualification		Final	
Athlete	Event	Distance	Position	Distance	Position
Lissa Labiche	High jump	1.71	=18	Did not advance	

== Badminton ==
Mixed team

Pool C

Pos	Team	Pld	W	L	GF	GA	GD	PF	PA	PD	Pts	Qualification
1	Scotland	3	3	0	30	0	+30	636	283	+353	3	Quarterfinals
2	New Zealand	3	2	1	20	10	+10	562	408	+154	2	
3	Guernsey	3	1	2	7	26	−19	409	666	−257	1	
4	Seychelles	3	0	3	6	27	−21	410	660	−250	0	

Source: glasgow2014.com

Scotland
5
Commonwealth Arena, Glasgow
24 July

Seychelles
0

			1	2	3
1	(Scotland) (Seychelles)	Martin Campbell / Jillie Cooper; Juliette Ah-Wan / Georgie Cupidon	21; 11	21; 5
2	(Scotland) (Seychelles)	Kieran Merrilees; Kervin Ghislain	21; 2	21; 8
3	(Scotland) (Seychelles)	Rebekka Findlay; Allisen Camille	21; 7	21; 11
4	(Scotland) (Seychelles)	Patrick Machugh / Martin Campbell; Georgie Cupidon / Steve Malcouzanne	21; 10	21; 4
5	(Scotland) (Seychelles)	Imogen Bankier / Caitlin Pringle; Juliette Ah-Wan / Allisen Camille	21; 14	21; 9

New Zealand
5
Commonwealth Arena, Glasgow
24 July

Seychelles
0

			1	2	3
1	(New Zealand) (Seychelles)	Oliver Leydon-Davis / Susannah Leydon-Davis; Georgie Cupidon / Juliette Ah-Wan	21; 8	21; 12
2	(New Zealand) (Seychelles)	Joe Wu; Kervin Ghislain	21; 13	21; 7
3	(New Zealand) (Seychelles)	Michelle Chan; Allisen Camille	21; 5	21; 9
4	(New Zealand) (Seychelles)	Kevin Dennerly-Minturn / Oliver Leydon-Davis; Georgie Cupidon / Steve Malcouzanne	21; 9	22; 20
5	(New Zealand) (Seychelles)	Michelle Chan / Madeleine Stapleton; Juliette Ah-Wan / Allisen Camille	21; 0	21; 0

Guernsey
3
Commonwealth Arena, Glasgow
25 July

Seychelles
2

			1	2	3
1	(Guernsey) (Seychelles)	Stuart Hardy / Gayle Lloyd; Georgie Cupidon / Juliette Ah-Wan	23; 21	11; 21	11; 21
2	(Guernsey) (Seychelles)	Daniel Penney; Kervin Ghislain	21; 16	22; 24	21; 17
3	(Guernsey) (Seychelles)	Elena Johnson; Allisen Camille	21; 14	21; 13
4	(Guernsey) (Seychelles)	Daniel Penney / Stuart Hardy; Georgie Cupidon / Steve Malcouzanne	16; 21	14; 21
5	(Guernsey) (Seychelles)	Elena Johnson / Gayle Lloyd; Juliette Ah-Wan / Allisen Camille	21; 17	16; 21	21; 19

== Judo ==
Men

Athlete	Event	Round of 32	Round of 16	Quarterfinals	Semifinals	Repechage	Final / BM	
Athlete	Event	Opposition Result	Opposition Result	Opposition Result	Opposition Result	Opposition Result	Opposition Result	Rank
Naddy Jeanne	−73 kg	Chilipweli (TAN); W 0002–0004	Fleming (NIR); L 0003–0101	Did not advance				
Leslie Philoe	−81 kg	Bye	Brewer (NZL); L 0000–1010	Did not advance				
Dominic Dugasse	−100 kg	—N/a	Montgomery (NIR); W 1001–0001	Burton (SCO); L 0003–1012	Did not advance	Pathania (IND); W 0000–1000	Did not advance	7

Women

Athlete	Event	Round of 16	Quarterfinal	Semifinal	Repechage	Final / BM	
Athlete	Event	Opposition Result	Opposition Result	Opposition Result	Opposition Result	Opposition Result	Rank
Brigitte Rose	−78 kg	—N/a	Gibbons (ENG); L 0000–1010	Did not advance	Muragu (KEN); W 100–000	Portuondo (CAN); L 0000–1000	5

== Swimming ==
Men

Athlete	Event	Heat		Semifinal		Final	
Athlete	Event	Time	Rank	Time	Rank	Time	Rank
Dean Hoffman	50 m freestyle	25.78	=47	Did not advance			
Adam Viktora	50 m freestyle	25.13	41	Did not advance			
Dean Hoffman	100 m freestyle	58.07	52	Did not advance			
Adam Viktora	100 m freestyle	55.10	42	Did not advance			
Dean Hoffman	200 m freestyle	2:14.60	37	—N/a		Did not advance	
Adam Viktora	200 m freestyle	2:04.65	31	—N/a		Did not advance	
Dean Hoffman	50 m backstroke	30.87	=30	Did not advance			
Dean Hoffman	100 m backstroke	1:09.60	33	Did not advance			
Adam Viktora	50 m butterfly	26.86	30	Did not advance			
Adam Viktora	100 m butterfly	1:01.13	30	Did not advance			

Women

Athlete	Event	Heat		Semifinal		Final	
Athlete	Event	Time	Rank	Time	Rank	Time	Rank
Felicity Passon	50 m freestyle	27.52	29	Did not advance			
Felicity Passon	100 m freestyle	1:00.15	28	Did not advance			
Felicity Passon	50 m backstroke	32.74	25	Did not advance			
Felicity Passon	50 m butterfly	28.95	25	Did not advance			
Felicity Passon	100 m butterfly	1:04.81	22	Did not advance			

== Weightlifting ==
Men

Athlete	Event	Snatch	Clean & jerk	Total	Rank
Rick Confiance	62 kg	106	125	231	16
Terence Dixie	85 kg	122	145	267	13

Women

Athlete	Event	Snatch	Clean & jerk	Total	Rank
Clementina Agricole	58 kg	88	111	199	4
Ruby Malvina	58 kg	75	95	170	10
Janet Georges	69 kg	85	95	180	10
