= Anolyn Lulu =

Vanuatuan table tennis player

Personal information
- Nationality: Vanuatu
- Born: 3 January 1979 (age 47) Maewo, Vanuatu
- Height: 157 cm (5.15 ft)
- Weight: 62 kg (137 lb)

Sport
- Sport: Table Tennis
Medal record
Women's Table tennis
Representing Vanuatu
Pacific Games
Gold medal – first place	2019 Apia	Team
Silver medal – second place	2007 Apia	Doubles
Silver medal – second place	2011 Nouméa	Mixed Doubles
Bronze medal – third place	2007 Apia	Mixed Doubles
Bronze medal – third place	2015 Port Moresby	Team

Anolyn Lulu (born 3 January 1979) is a Ni-Vanuatu table tennis player who competed in 2012 Summer Olympics. She was the flag-bearer for Vanuatu at the opening ceremony of the 2012 Summer Olympics and the 2023 Pacific Games.

Olympic Games
Preceded by Priscila Tommy	Flagbearer for Vanuatu; London 2012	Succeeded by Yoshua Shing
