= List of flag bearers for Vanuatu at the Olympics =

Vanuatu at the Olympics
- IOC code: VAN
- NOC: Vanuatu Association of Sports and National Olympic Committee
- Website: afcnovasanoc.wixsite.com/vasanoc
- Medals: Gold 0 Silver 0 Bronze 0 Total 0

Summer appearances
- 1988; 1992; 1996; 2000; 2004; 2008; 2012; 2016; 2020; 2024

This is a list of flag bearers who have represented Vanuatu at the Olympics.

Flag bearers carry the national flag of their country at the opening ceremony of the Olympic Games.

#	Event year	Season	Flag bearer	Sport
1	1988	Summer	Olivette Daruhi	Athletics
2	1992	Summer		
3	1996	Summer	Tawai Keiruan	Athletics
4	2000	Summer	Mary-Estelle Kapalu	Athletics
5	2004	Summer	Moses Kamut	Athletics
6	2008	Summer	Priscila Tommy	Table tennis
7	2012	Summer	Anolyn Lulu	Table tennis
8	2016	Summer	Yoshua Shing	Table tennis
9	2020	Summer	Rio Rii	Rowing
10	2024	Summer	Hugo Cumbo	Judo
10	2024	Summer	Priscila Tommy	Table tennis

== See also ==
- Vanuatu at the Olympics
