= Table tennis at the 2012 Summer Olympics – Qualification =

A National Olympic Committee (NOC) may enter up to six athletes, two male and two female athletes in singles events and up to one men's and one women's team in team events.

== Qualification summary ==
NOC	Men's Singles	Men's Team	Women's Singles	Women's Team	Total Athletes
Argentina	1				1
Australia	2	X	2	X	6
Austria	2	X	2	X	6
Belarus	1		2		3
Belgium	1				1
Brazil	2	X	2	X	6
Cameroon			1		1
Canada	2	X	1		4
Chile			1		1
China	2	X	2	X	6
Colombia			1		1
Republic of the Congo	2		1		3
Croatia	2		2		4
Cuba	1				1
Czech Republic			2		2
North Korea	2	X	2	X	6
Denmark	2		1		3
Djibouti			1		1
Dominican Republic	1				1
Egypt	2	X	2	X	6
France	1		2		3
Germany	2	X	2	X	6
Great Britain	1	X	1	X	6
Greece	2				2
Hong Kong	2	X	2	X	6
Hungary	2		2		4
India	1		1		2
Iran	1		1		2
Italy	1		1		2
Japan	2	X	2	X	6
South Korea	2	X	2	X	6
Kuwait	1				1
Latvia	1				1
Lebanon			1		1
Luxembourg			1		1
Mexico			1		1
Netherlands			2	X	3
Nigeria	2		2		4
Paraguay	1				1
Poland	1		2	X	4
Portugal	2	X	1		4
Qatar			1		1
Romania	1		2		3
Russia	2	X	2		5
Serbia	2				2
Singapore	2	X	2	X	6
Slovenia	1				1
Spain	2		2	X	5
Sweden	2	X			3
Chinese Taipei	1		2		3
Thailand			1		1
Togo	1				1
Turkey	1		1		2
Ukraine	2		2		4
United States	1		2	X	4
Vanuatu	1		1		2
Venezuela			1		1
Total: 57 NOCs	69	48	70	48	173

== Qualifiers ==
=== Singles ===
A total of 69 athletes qualified for each singles event as follows:

†: Athlete qualified for team event only.

==== Men ====
Event	Date	Venue	Vacancies	Qualifiers
ITTF World Ranking	May 15, 2011	—	28	Wang Hao (CHN); Timo Boll (GER); Zhang Jike (CHN); Jun Mizutani (JPN); Vladimir Samsonov (BLR); Joo Se-Hyuk (KOR); Oh Sang-Eun (KOR); Chuang Chih-yuan (TPE); Dimitrij Ovtcharov (GER); Gao Ning (SIN); Tang Peng (HKG); Michael Maze (DEN); Alexey Smirnov (RUS); Adrien Mattenet (FRA); Werner Schlager (AUT); Jiang Tianyi (HKG); Kalinikos Kreanga (GRE); Seiya Kishikawa (JPN); Jörgen Persson (SWE); Chen Weixing (AUT); Adrian Crişan (ROU); Jean-Michel Saive (BEL); Panagiotis Gionis (GRE); Zoran Primorac (CRO); Pär Gerell (SWE); Yang Zi (SIN); Alexander Shibaev (RUS); Bojan Tokič (SLO)
West Asian Men's Qualification Tournament	June 27–30, 2011	(United Arab Emirates) Dubai	1	Ibrahim Al-Hasan (KUW)
2011 All-Africa Games	September 4–13, 2011	(Mozambique) Maputo	6	Omar Assar (EGY); El-Sayed Lashin (EGY); Quadri Aruna (NGR); Segun Toriola (NGR); Suraju Saka (CGO); Saheed Idowu (CGO)
2011 Pan American Games	October 15–20, 2011	(Mexico) Guadalajara	1	Liu Song (ARG)
Middle Asia Qualification Tournament	January 9–11, 2012	(Iran) Tehran	1	Noshad Alamian (IRI)†
Southeast Asian Qualification Tournament	February 4–5, 2012	(Thailand) Bangkok	1	Zhan Jian (SIN)†
Latin America Qualification Tournament	March 4 – 6, 2012	(Brazil) Rio de Janeiro	5	Lin Ju (DOM); Gustavo Tsuboi (BRA); Marcelo Aguirre (PAR); Hugo Hoyama (BRA); Andy Pereira (CUB)
Oceania Qualification Tournament	March 5–8, 2012	(Australia) Sydney	3	William Henzell (AUS); Justin Han (AUS); Yoshua Shing (VAN)
European Qualification Tournament	April 11–15, 2012	Luxembourg City	11	Marcos Freitas (POR); Robert Gardos (AUT)†; João Monteiro (POR); Bastian Steger (GER)†; Dániel Zwickl (HUN); Aleksandar Karakašević (SRB); Marko Jevtović (SRB); He Zhiwen (ESP); Kirill Skachkov (RUS)†; Jens Lundqvist (SWE)†; Ádám Pattantyús (HUN)
Asian Qualification Tournament	April 19–22, 2012	Hong Kong	8	Leung Chu Yan (HKG)†; Koki Niwa (JPN)†; Ma Long (CHN)†; Ryu Seung-Min (KOR)†; Kim Hyok-Bong (PRK); Kim Song-Nam (PRK); Jang Song-Man (PRK)†; Soumyajit Ghosh (IND)*
Northern American Qualification Tournament	April 20–22, 2012	(United States) Cary, North Carolina	3	Andre Ho (CAN); Pierre-Luc Hinse (CAN); Timothy Wang (USA)
Final World Olympic Qualification Tournament	May 10–13, 2012	(Qatar) Doha	2	Tiago Apolonia (POR)†; Carlos Machado (ESP)
Re-distributed Quota	May 10–13, 2012	(Qatar) Doha	8	Oleksandr Didukh (UKR); Wang Zeng Yi (POL); Andrej Gaćina (CRO); Bora Vang (TUR); Allan Bentsen (DEN); Mihai Bobocica (ITA); Yaroslav Zhmudenko (UKR); Matīss Burģis (LAT)
Host Country Representation	May 13, 2012	—	1	Paul Drinkhall (GBR)
Tripartite Commission Invitation Place	May 30, 2012	—	1	Mawussi Agbetoglo (TOG)
Team Allocation	May 30, 2012	—	6	Zhen Wang (CAN)†; Liam Pitchford (GBR)†; Andrew Baggaley (GBR)†; Ahmed Saleh (EGY)†; Robert Frank (AUS)†; Thiago Monteiro (BRA)†
Total			86	

* Highest ranked South Asian athlete.

==== Women ====
Event	Date	Venue	Vacancies	Qualifiers
ITTF World Ranking	May 15, 2011	—	28	Li Xiaoxia (CHN); Ding Ning (CHN)*; Feng Tianwei (SIN); Kasumi Ishikawa (JPN); Ai Fukuhara (JPN); Kim Kyung-Ah (KOR); Wang Yuegu (SIN); Tie Ya Na (HKG); Wu Jiaduo (GER); Li Jiao (NED); Jiang Huajun (HKG); Shen Yanfei (ESP); Park Mi-Young (KOR); Li Jie (NED); Huang Yi-hua (TPE); Viktoria Pavlovich (BLR); Melek Hu (TUR); Li Qian (POL); Krisztina Tóth (HUN); Daniela Dodean (ROU); Kim Jong (PRK); Georgina Póta (HUN); Elizabeta Samara (ROU); Li Xue (FRA); Ni Xialian (LUX); Kristin Silbereisen (GER); Liu Jia (AUT); Iveta Vacenovská (CZE)
2011 All-Africa Games	September 4–13, 2011	(Mozambique) Maputo	6	Offiong Edem (NGR); Olufunke Oshonaike (NGR); Xing Han (CGO); Nadeen El-Dawlatly (EGY); Dina Meshref (EGY); Sarah Hanffou (CMR)
2011 Pan American Games	October 15–20, 2011	(Mexico) Guadalajara	1	Zhang Mo (CAN)
West Asian Women's Qualification Tournament	October 19–20, 2011	(Jordan) Amman	1	Tvin Carole Moumjoghlian (LIB)
Middle Asia Qualification Tournament	January 9–11, 2012	(Iran) Tehran	1	Neda Shahsavari (IRI)
Southeast Asian Qualification Tournament	February 4–5, 2012	(Thailand) Bangkok	1	Li Jiawei (SIN)†
Latin America Qualification Tournament	March 4–6, 2012	(Brazil) Rio de Janeiro	6	Lígia Silva (BRA); Paula Medina (COL); Yadira Silva (MEX); Caroline Kumahara (BRA); Fabiola Ramos (VEN); Berta Rodríguez (CHI)
Oceania Qualification Tournament	March 5–8, 2012	(Australia) Sydney	3	Lay Jian Fang (AUS); Miao Miao (AUS); Anolyn Lulu (VAN)
European Qualification Tournament	April 11–15, 2012	Luxembourg City	11	Irene Ivancan (GER)†; Natalia Partyka (POL); Mie Skov (DEN); Xian Yi Fang (FRA); Cornelia Molnar (CRO); Margaryta Pesotska (UKR); Tian Yuan (CRO); Aleksandra Privalova (BLR); Li Qiangbing (AUT); Amelie Solja (AUT)†; Wenling Tan Monfardini (ITA)
Asian Qualification Tournament	April 19–22, 2012	Hong Kong	8	Guo Yue (CHN)†; Ri Myong-Sun (PRK); Sayaka Hirano (JPN)†; Seok Ha-Jung (KOR)†; Chen Szu-yu (TPE); Nanthana Komwong (THA); Ri Mi-Gyong (PRK)†; Ankita Das (IND)**
Northern American Qualification Tournament	April 20–22, 2012	(United States) Cary, North Carolina	2	Ariel Hsing (USA); Lily Zhang (USA)
Final World Olympic Qualification Tournament	May 10–13, 2012	(Qatar) Doha	2	Dana Hadačová (CZE); Sara Ramírez (ESP)
Re-distributed Quota	May 10–13, 2012	(Qatar) Doha	6	Galia Dvorak (ESP)†; Anna Tikhomirova (RUS); Yana Noskova (RUS); Lee Ho Ching (HKG)†; Lei Huang Mendes (POR); Tetyana Bilenko (UKR)
Host Country Representation	May 13, 2012	—	1	Joanna Parker (GBR)
Tripartite Commission Invitation Place	May 30, 2012	—	1	Yasmin Hassan Farah (DJI)
Team Allocation	May 30, 2012	—	8	Katarzyna Grzybowska (POL)†; Erica Wu (USA)†; Kelly Sibley (GBR)†; Na Liu (GBR)†; Elena Timina (NED)†; Raghd Magdy (EGY)†; Tan Zhenhua (AUS)†; Gui Lin (BRA)†
Special Invitation by IOC	July 12, 2012	—	1	Aia Mohamed (QAT)
Total			87	

* Guo Yan is replaced by Ding Ning.

** Highest ranked South Asian athlete.

=== Team ===
Sixteen teams, including one team from each of six continents and the host NOC, qualified the team events. The qualification of an NOC was based on the number of the qualified players and the ranking of the 2012 World Team Championships. The 2012 World Team Championships were held from March 25 to April 1, 2012, in Dortmund, Germany. A total of fourteen quota places per gender were reserved for completing qualified teams representing NOCs with less than three qualified individual athletes. Eight men's quotas and four women's quotas remained unused, and were transferred to the singles competition of the same gender and added to the Final Qualification Tournament.

==== Men's team ====
Event	Date	Vacancies	Qualifiers
Continental Quota	May 14, 2012	6	Egypt (Africa); China (Asia); Germany (Europe); Brazil (Latin America); Canada (Northern America); Australia (Oceania)
Host NOC	May 14, 2012	1	Great Britain
Remaining Quota	May 14, 2012	9	South Korea; Japan; Austria; Sweden; Singapore; Hong Kong; Portugal; North Korea; Russia
TOTAL		16	

NOC	Continent	Qualifiers	WTC ranking
China	Asia	3	1
Germany	Europe	3	2
Japan	Asia	3	3
South Korea	Asia	3	3
Austria	Europe	3	5
Sweden	Europe	3	6
Singapore	Asia	3	8
Hong Kong	Asia	3	9
Portugal	Europe	3	11
North Korea	Asia	3	13
Russia	Europe	3	14
Greece	Europe	2	15
Serbia	Europe	2	16
Hungary	Europe	2	17
Denmark	Europe	2	20
Spain	Europe	2	21
Croatia	Europe	2	22
Ukraine	Europe	2	25
Brazil	Latin America	2	28
Egypt	Africa	2	30
Nigeria	Africa	2	32
Australia	Oceania	2	35
Canada	Northern America	2	43
Republic of the Congo	Africa	2	71

==== Women's team ====
Event	Date	Vacancies	Qualifiers
Continental Quota	May 14, 2012	6	Egypt (Africa); China (Asia); Germany (Europe); Brazil (Latin America); United States (Northern America); Australia (Oceania)
Host NOC	May 14, 2012	1	Great Britain
Remaining Quota	May 14, 2012	9	Singapore; South Korea; Hong Kong; Japan; North Korea; Austria; Spain; Netherlands; Poland
TOTAL		16	

NOC	Continent	Qualifiers	WTC ranking
China	Asia	3	1
Singapore	Asia	3	2
South Korea	Asia	3	3
Hong Kong	Asia	3	3
Japan	Asia	3	5
Germany	Europe	3	7
North Korea	Asia	3	9
Austria	Europe	3	10
Spain	Europe	3	17
Netherlands	Europe	2	6
Poland	Europe	2	8
Hungary	Europe	2	11
Romania	Europe	2	12
Belarus	Europe	2	13
Chinese Taipei	Asia	2	14
Russia	Europe	2	15
Croatia	Europe	2	16
Czech Republic	Europe	2	18
Ukraine	Europe	2	19
France	Europe	2	22
United States	Northern America	2	23
Australia	Oceania	2	25
Brazil	Latin America	2	36
Egypt	Africa	2	39
Nigeria	Africa	2	42
