= Table tennis at the 2012 Summer Olympics – Women's singles =

Women's singles at the Games of the XXX Olympiad
- Venue: ExCeL London
- Date: 28 July – 1 August
- Competitors: 70 from 45 nations

Medalists
1st place, gold medalist(s)		Li Xiaoxia	China
2nd place, silver medalist(s)		Ding Ning	China
3rd place, bronze medalist(s)		Feng Tianwei	Singapore

The women's singles table tennis event was a part of the table tennis programme at the 2012 Summer Olympics in London. The event took place from Saturday 28 July to Wednesday 1 August 2012 at ExCeL London. The tournament was a single elimination tournament with a third place playoff played between the two losing semi-finalists.

The draw was conducted on 25 July 2012.

== Schedule ==
All times are British Summer Time (UTC+1).

Dates	Start time	Round
28 July	9:00	Preliminary round
28 July	11:15	First round
28 July	20:30	Second round
29 July	9:00	Second round
29 July	18:00	Third round
30 July	15:30	Fourth round
31 July	10:00	Quarterfinals
31 July	16:00	Semifinals
1 August	14:30	Bronze medal match
1 August	15:30	Gold medal match

== Seeds ==
Seeds were based on the ITTF World Ranking lists published in July 2012. The top 16 seeded players qualified directly to the third round.

1. Ding Ning (CHN) (final, silver medalist)
2. Li Xiaoxia (CHN) (champion, gold medalist)
3. Kim Kyung-Ah (KOR) (quarterfinals)
4. Kasumi Ishikawa (JPN) (semifinals, fourth place)
5. Ai Fukuhara (JPN) (quarterfinals)
6. Feng Tianwei (SIN) (semifinals, bronze medalist)
7. Tie Ya Na (HKG) (third round)
8. Wang Yuegu (SIN) (quarterfinals)
9. Wu Jiaduo (GER) (fourth round)
10. Shen Yanfei (ESP) (fourth round)
11. Li Jiao (NED) (quarterfinals)
12. Jiang Huajun (HKG) (fourth round)
13. Viktoria Pavlovich (BLR) (fourth round)
14. Li Jie (NED) (fourth round)
15. Li Qian (POL) (fourth round)
16. Park Mi-Young (KOR) (fourth round)

The players ranked from 17 to 32 qualified directly to the second round.

17. Ri Myong-Sun (PRK) (second round)
18. Daniela Dodean (ROU) (third round)
19. Ni Xialian (LUX) (second round)
20. Huang Yi-hua (TPE) (third round)
21. Liu Jia (AUT) (third round)
22. Kristin Silbereisen (GER) (third round)
23. Georgina Póta (HUN) (third round)
24. Elizabeta Samara (ROU) (fourth round)
25. Kim Jong (PRK) (third round)
26. Margaryta Pesotska (UKR) (third round)
27. Iveta Vacenovská (CZE) (third round)
28. Chen Szu-yu (TPE) (third round)
29. Anna Tikhomirova (RUS) (third round)
30. Li Qiangbing (AUT) (third round)
31. Natalia Partyka (POL) (third round)
32. Li Xue (FRA) (third round)

== Draw ==
=== Finals ===
Semifinals
1	Ding Ning (CHN)	11	11	9	12	6	11
6	Feng Tianwei (SIN)	7	4	11	10	11	6
4	Kasumi Ishikawa (JPN)	5	4	13	6	7
2	Li Xiaoxia (CHN)	11	11	11	11	11

Gold medal match
1	Ding Ning (CHN) (silver)	8	12	11	6	4
2	Li Xiaoxia (CHN) (gold)	11	14	8	11	11
Bronze medal match
6	Feng Tianwei (SIN) (bronze)	11	11	11	11
4	Kasumi Ishikawa (JPN)	9	6	6	5

=== Top half ===
==== Section 1 ====
Second round
18	D Dodean (ROU)	7	8	11	5	11	11	11
45	T Bilenko (UKR)	11	11	5	11	7	9	2
43	C Molnar (CRO)	9	11	6	4	8
25	J Kim (PRK)	11	9	11	11	11
31	N Partyka (POL)	5	11	12	8	9	11	11
34	M Skov (DEN)	11	3	10	11	11	7	9
39	W Tan (ITA)	11	6	8	14	11	6	10
29	A Tikhomirova (RUS)	6	11	11	12	8	11	12

Third round
1	N Ding (CHN)	11	11	11	11
18	D Dodean (ROU)	4	3	9	6
25	J Kim (PRK)	5	9	11	7	11	7
12	H Jiang (HKG)	11	11	7	11	5	11
14	Jie Li (NED)	11	6	16	11	12	11
31	N Partyka (POL)	13	11	14	7	10	7
29	A Tikhomirova (RUS)	7	8	9	3
5	A Fukuhara (JPN)	11	11	11	11

Fourth round
1	N Ding (CHN)	12	11	11	9	11
12	H Jiang (HKG)	10	2	5	11	6
14	Jie Li (NED)	4	11	11	11	5	8	8
5	A Fukuhara (JPN)	11	8	8	6	11	11	11

Quarterfinals
1	N Ding (CHN)	15	11	11	11
5	A Fukuhara (JPN)	13	6	6	4

==== Section 2 ====
Second round
28	S-Y Chen (TPE)	10	7	7	15	11	11	13
37	K Tóth (HUN)	12	11	11	13	5	5	11
40	N Komwong (THA)	16	6	4	5	3
27	I Vacenovská (CZE)	14	11	11	11	11
32	X Li (FRA)	11	13	7	11	9	9	11
48	JF Lay (AUS)	7	11	11	3	11	11	6
42	A Privalova (BLR)	11	4	8	10	12	4
21	J Liu (AUT)	5	11	11	12	10	11

Third round
6	T Feng (SIN)	11	11	11	12	11
28	S-Y Chen (TPE)	6	13	5	10	9
27	I Vacenovská (CZE)	9	13	11	8	11	5
9	J Wu (GER)	11	15	8	11	9	11
10	Y Shen (ESP)	11	11	11	11
32	X Li (FRA)	5	2	8	3
21	J Liu (AUT)	8	11	4	5	9
3	K-A Kim (KOR)	11	6	11	11	11

Fourth round
6	T Feng (SIN)	11	7	11	9	11	11
9	J Wu (GER)	6	11	5	11	6	6
10	Y Shen (ESP)	8	9	6	11	7
3	K-A Kim (KOR)	11	11	11	9	11

Quarterfinals
6	T Feng (SIN)	13	11	4	11	10	12
3	K-A Kim (KOR)	11	7	11	6	12	10

=== Bottom half ===
==== Section 3 ====
Second round
30	Q Li (AUT)	11	9	11	11	11
52	M Zhang (CAN)	9	11	2	9	9
56	M Miao (AUS)	7	9	7	4
20	Y-h Huang (TPE)	11	11	11	11
22	K Silbereisen (GER)	11	11	7	11	11
47	J Parker (GBR)	6	7	11	2	4
33	Y Xian (FRA)	11	11	6	11	8	11
17	M-S Ri (PRK)	9	6	11	9	11	6

Third round
4	K Ishikawa (JPN)	11	10	11	12	11	11
30	Q Li (AUT)	13	12	7	10	8	5
20	Y-h Huang (TPE)	7	8	6	3
15	Q Li (POL)	11	11	11	11
13	V Pavlovich (BLR)	12	13	9	11	11	11
22	K Silbereisen (GER)	10	11	11	13	4	7
33	Y Xian (FRA)	9	8	6	4
8	Y Wang (SIN)	11	11	11	11

Fourth round
4	K Ishikawa (JPN)	11	11	10	14	11
15	Q Li (POL)	8	5	12	12	6
13	V Pavlovich (BLR)	6	11	11	14	7	9	8
8	Y Wang (SIN)	11	7	4	12	11	11	11

Quarterfinals
4	K Ishikawa (JPN)	8	11	11	11	11
8	Y Wang (SIN)	11	5	4	8	4

==== Section 4 ====
Second round
24	E Samara (ROU)	7	11	13	11	11
51	D Meshref (EGY)	11	7	11	6	8
36	S Ramírez (ESP)	7	9	11	11	6
26	M Pesotska (UKR)	11	11	8	13	11
23	G Póta (HUN)	11	11	11	12	11
44	Y Tian (CRO)	13	4	2	10	2
46	A Hsing (USA)	11	10	11	11	10	12
19	X Ni (LUX)	9	12	9	5	12	10

Third round
7	YN Tie (HKG)	9	9	8	11	11	8
24	E Samara (ROU)	11	11	11	6	5	11
26	M Pesotska (UKR)	3	9	4	4
11	Jiao Li (NED)	11	11	11	11
16	M-Y Park (KOR)	3	11	11	11	11
23	G Póta (HUN)	11	8	8	6	9
46	A Hsing (USA)	4	11	6	11	8	9
2	X Li (CHN)	11	9	11	6	11	11

Fourth round
24	E Samara (ROU)	5	11	11	11	9	7
11	Jiao Li (NED)	11	8	13	6	11	11
16	M-Y Park (KOR)	11	7	6	5	6
2	X Li (CHN)	6	11	11	11	11

Quarterfinals
11	Jiao Li (NED)	5	9	9	7
2	X Li (CHN)	11	11	11	11

== Preliminary rounds ==
=== Top half ===
==== Section 1 ====
Preliminary round
63	O Oshonaike (NGR)	11	11	11	9	11	5	11
66	N Shahsavari (IRI)	13	8	8	11	4	11	3

First round
45	T Bilenko (UKR)	11	11	11	8	11
55	P Medina (COL)	4	2	8	11	7
43	C Molnar (CRO)	11	11	11	11
49	L Zhang (USA)	6	8	7	5
34	M Skov (DEN)	11	11	11	11
62	N El-Dawlatly (EGY)	9	6	7	9
39	W Tan (ITA)	11	11	12	11
63	O Oshonaike (NGR)	7	5	10	1

==== Section 2 ====
Preliminary round
58	L Silva (BRA)	11	11	11	11
68	A Lulu (VAN)	5	9	2	3

First round
37	K Tóth (HUN)	11	9	9	12	11	11	12
60	F Ramos (VEN)	9	11	11	14	5	9	10
40	N Komwong (THA)	4	3	11	12	11	11	12
50	L Huang Mendes (POR)	11	11	6	14	8	2	10
48	JF Lay (AUS)	8	11	11	11	11
58	L Silva (BRA)	11	1	5	6	1
42	A Privalova (BLR)	11	7	11	11	8	11
53	X Han (CGO)	2	11	6	8	11	9

=== Bottom half ===
==== Section 3 ====
Preliminary round
52	M Zhang (CAN)	11	11	11	11
69	A Majdi (QAT)	3	7	6	3
54	C Kumahara (BRA)	11	11	11	11
70	Y Farah (DJI)	0	2	2	4
61	S Hanffou (CMR)	11	11	11	11
67	T Moumjoghlian (LIB)	6	4	6	2

First round
41	M Hu (TUR)	11	11	10	11	4	11	14
52	M Zhang (CAN)	8	9	12	9	11	13	16
38	D Hadačová (CZE)	8	9	11	11	7	7
56	M Miao (AUS)	11	11	6	7	11	11
47	J Parker (GBR)	11	11	11	11
54	C Kumahara (BRA)	7	5	9	5
33	Y Xian (FRA)	8	11	11	11	11
61	S Hanffou (CMR)	11	7	7	3	6

==== Section 4 ====
Preliminary round
51	D Meshref (EGY)	11	2	11	10	11	11
65	O Edem (NGR)	5	11	7	12	6	3

First round
35	Y Noskova (RUS)	10	11	11	11	12	9	9
51	D Meshref (EGY)	12	8	4	9	14	11	11
36	S Ramírez (ESP)	11	11	11	8	11
57	A Das (IND)	9	8	7	11	2
44	Y Tian (CRO)	11	11	11	11
64	B Rodríguez (CHI)	6	6	7	7
46	A Hsing (USA)	11	11	11	11
59	Y Silva (MEX)	9	8	3	5
