= Huang Lei (disambiguation) =

Huang Lei (born 1971) is a Chinese actor, director, singer, screenwriter, and model.

Huang Lei may also refer to:

- Huang Lei (footballer) (born 2002), Chinese footballer
- Huang Lei (tennis) (born 1986), Chinese tennis player
- Huang Lei (fighter), British Chinese foreign fighter who participated in the Syrian Civil War
- Lei Huang Mendes (born 1982), Chinese-born Portuguese table tennis player
