= Vanuatu at the 2008 Summer Paralympics =

- IPC code: VAN
- NPC: Vanuatu Paralympic Committee

in Beijing
- Competitors: 1 in 1 sport
- Flag bearers: Tom Tete (opening) none (closing)
- Medals Ranked -th: Gold 0 Silver 0 Bronze 0 Total 0

Summer Paralympics appearances (overview)
- 2000; 2004; 2008; 2012; 2016–2020; 2024

Vanuatu competed at the 2008 Summer Paralympics in Beijing. The country was making its return to the Paralympic Games, having been absent from the 2004 edition. Vanuatu sent only a small delegation with powerlifter Tom Tete as the only athlete, and did not win any medals.

== Powerlifting ==
Men

Athlete	Class	Event	Result	Rank
Tom Tete	-	-60 kg	80.0	13

== See also ==
- Vanuatu at the Paralympics
- Vanuatu at the 2008 Summer Olympics
