= Vanuatu at the 1992 Summer Olympics =

- IOC code: VAN
- NOC: Vanuatu Association of Sports and National Olympic Committee

in Barcelona
- Competitors: 6 in 1 sport
- Medals: Gold 0 Silver 0 Bronze 0 Total 0

Summer Olympics appearances (overview)
- 1988; 1992; 1996; 2000; 2004; 2008; 2012; 2016; 2020; 2024

Vanuatu competed at the 1992 Summer Olympics in Barcelona, Spain.

== Competitors ==
The following is the list of number of competitors in the Games.

Sport	Men	Women	Total
Athletics	4	2	6
Total	4	2	6

== Athletics ==
Men

=== Track events ===
Athlete	Events	Heat		Quarterfinal		Semifinal		Final	
Athlete	Events	Time	Position	Time	Position	Time	Position	Time	Position
Fletcher Wamilee	100 m	11.41	8	Did not advance					
Baptiste Firiam	400 m	48.98	7	Did not advance					
Baptiste Firiam	800 m	1:57.96	7	n/a		Did not advance			
Ancel Nalau	1500 m	4:13.88	13	n/a		Did not advance			
Tawai Keiruan	5000 m	15:27.46	13	n/a				Did not advance	

Women

=== Track events ===
Athlete	Events	Heat		Quarterfinal		Semifinal		Final	
Athlete	Events	Time	Position	Time	Position	Time	Position	Time	Position
Mary-Estelle Kapalu	400 m	55.57	7	Did not advance					
Mary-Estelle Kapalu	400 m hurdles	1:00.97	7	n/a		Did not advance			
Andrea Garae	800 m	2:28.61	7	n/a		Did not advance			
