= Disability in Vanuatu =

In 2009, there were 28,082 people of Vanuatu which had various degree of disability, which constituted about 12% of the total population.

== History ==
In 2007, the country signed the Convention on the Rights of Persons with Disabilities and ratified it a year later in 2008. Since then, the government had established the National Disability Policy and Plan of Action 2008–2015, the Mental Health Policy and Plan 2009–2015 and the Inclusive Education Policy and Strategic Plan 2010–2020.

== See also ==
- Demographics of Vanuatu
- Vanuatu at the Paralympics
