= Vanuatu at the 2020 Summer Olympics =

- IOC code: VAN
- NOC: Vanuatu Association of Sports and National Olympic Committee
- Website: www.oceaniasport.com/vanuatu

in Tokyo July 23, 2021 – August 8, 2021
- Competitors: 3 in 3 sports
- Flag bearer (opening): Rio Rii
- Flag bearer (closing): Rio Rii
- Medals: Gold 0 Silver 0 Bronze 0 Total 0

Summer Olympics appearances (overview)
- 1988; 1992; 1996; 2000; 2004; 2008; 2012; 2016; 2020; 2024

Vanuatu competed at the 2020 Summer Olympics in Tokyo, Japan. Originally scheduled to take place from 24 July to 9 August 2020, the 2020 Games were postponed to 23 July to 8 August 2021, because of the COVID-19 pandemic. This was the nation's ninth consecutive appearance at the Summer Olympics.

== Competitors ==
The following is the list of number of competitors in the Games.

Sport	Men	Women	Total
Judo	1	0	1
Rowing	1	0	1
Table tennis	1	0	1
Total	3	0	3

== Judo ==
Vanuatu entered one male judoka into the Olympic tournament based on the International Judo Federation Olympics Individual Ranking.

Athlete	Event	Round of 64	Round of 32	Round of 16	Quarterfinals	Semifinals	Repechage	Final / BM	
Athlete	Event	Opposition Result	Opposition Result	Opposition Result	Opposition Result	Opposition Result	Opposition Result	Opposition Result	Rank
Hugo Cumbo	Men's –81 kg	Bye	Boltaboev (UZB); L00–10	Did not advance					

== Rowing ==
Vanuatu entered one boat in the men's single sculls for the games, after receiving the tripartite invitation quotas.

Athlete	Event	Heats		Repechage		Quarterfinals		Semifinals		Final	
Athlete	Event	Time	Rank	Time	Rank	Time	Rank	Time	Rank	Time	Rank
Rio Rii	Men's single sculls	8:00.98	6 R	8:17.00	3 SE/F	Bye		8:19.99	3 FF	7:49.82	30

Qualification Legend: FA=Final A (medal); FB=Final B (non-medal); FC=Final C (non-medal); FD=Final D (non-medal); FE=Final E (non-medal); FF=Final F (non-medal); SA/B=Semifinals A/B; SC/D=Semifinals C/D; SE/F=Semifinals E/F; QF=Quarterfinals; R=Repechage

== Table tennis ==
Vanuatu entered one athlete into the table tennis competition at the Games. Yoshua Shing received an invitation to compete, based on the rankings, following the cancellation of the 2021 Oceanian Olympics Qualification Tournament.

Athlete	Event	Preliminary	Round 1	Round 2	Round 3	Round of 16	Quarterfinals	Semifinals	Final / BM	
Athlete	Event	Opposition Result	Opposition Result	Opposition Result	Opposition Result	Opposition Result	Opposition Result	Opposition Result	Opposition Result	Rank
Yoshua Shing	Men's singles	Bye	Cifuentes (ARG); L 0–4	Did not advance						
