= Vanuatu at the 2024 Summer Olympics =

- IOC code: VAN
- NOC: Vanuatu Association of Sports and National Olympic Committee
- Website: www.oceaniasport.com/vanuatu

in Paris, France 26 July 2024 – 11 August 2024
- Competitors: 6 (2 men and 4 women) in 5 sports
- Flag bearers: Hugo Cumbo & Priscila Tommy
- Medals: Gold 0 Silver 0 Bronze 0 Total 0

Summer Olympics appearances (overview)
- 1988; 1992; 1996; 2000; 2004; 2008; 2012; 2016; 2020; 2024

Vanuatu competed at the 2024 Summer Olympics in Paris from 26 July to 11 August 2024. Since the nation made its debut in 1988, Ni-Vanuatu athletes have participated in every edition of the Summer Olympic Games.

== Competitors ==
The following is the list of number of competitors in the Games.

| Sport | Men | Women | Total |
|---|---|---|---|
| Athletics | 0 | 1 | 1 |
| Judo | 1 | 0 | 1 |
| Swimming | 1 | 1 | 2 |
| Table tennis | 0 | 1 | 1 |
| Weightlifting | 0 | 1 | 1 |
| Total | 2 | 4 | 6 |

== Athletics ==
Vanuatu sent one sprinter to compete at the 2024 Summer Olympics.

Key

- Note–Ranks given for track events are within the athlete's heat only
- Q = Qualified for the next round
- q = Qualified for the next round as a fastest loser or, in field events, by position without achieving the qualifying target
- NR = National record
- N/A = Round not applicable for the event
- Bye = Athlete not required to compete in round

Track events

| Athlete | Event | Preliminary | | Heat | | Semifinal | | Final | |
| Athlete | Event | Result | Rank | Result | Rank | Result | Rank | Result | Rank |
|---|---|---|---|---|---|---|---|---|---|
| Chloe David | Women's 100 m | 12.44 PB | 6 | Did not advance | | | | | |

== Judo ==
Vanuatu qualified one judoka for the following weight class at the Games. Hugo Cumbo (men's half-middleweight, 81 kg) got qualified via continental quota based on Olympic point rankings.

| Athlete | Event | Round of 64 | Round of 32 | Round of 16 | Quarterfinals | Semifinals | Repechage | Final / BM | |
| Athlete | Event | Opposition Result | Opposition Result | Opposition Result | Opposition Result | Opposition Result | Opposition Result | Opposition Result | Rank |
|---|---|---|---|---|---|---|---|---|---|
| Hugo Cumbo | Men's –81 kg | Bye | de Wit (NED); L 00–10 | Did not advance | | | | | |

== Swimming ==
Vanuatu sent two swimmers to compete at the 2024 Paris Olympics, marking the nation's debut in this sport.

| Athlete | Event | Heat | | Semifinal | | Final | |
| Athlete | Event | Time | Rank | Time | Rank | Time | Rank |
|---|---|---|---|---|---|---|---|
| Johnathan Silas | Men's 100 m freestyle | 59.38 | 77 | Did not advance | | | |
| Loane Russet | Women's 50 m freestyle | 28.86 | 54 | Did not advance | | | |

Qualifiers for the latter rounds (Q) of all events were decided on a time only basis, therefore positions shown are overall results versus competitors in all heats.

== Table tennis ==
Vanuatu table tennis players qualified one participant in the women's singles for the Games, by way of winning the gold medal at the 2024 Oceania Qualification Tournament in Nouméa, New Caledonia.

| Athlete | Event | Preliminary | Round 1 | Round 2 | Round 3 | Round of 16 | Quarterfinals | Semifinals | Final / BM | |
| Athlete | Event | Opposition Result | Opposition Result | Opposition Result | Opposition Result | Opposition Result | Opposition Result | Opposition Result | Opposition Result | Rank |
|---|---|---|---|---|---|---|---|---|---|---|
| Priscila Tommy | Women's singles | Bye | Wang (USA); L 0–4 | Did not advance | | | | | | |

== Weightlifting ==
Vanuatu entered one female weightlifter into the Olympic competition. Ajah Pritchard Lolo (women's under 81 kg) secured one quota to participate in her weight division based on the allocation of universality spots, marking the nation's debut in these sports.

| Athlete | Event | Snatch | | Clean & Jerk | | Total | Rank |
| Athlete | Event | Result | Rank | Result | Rank | Total | Rank |
|---|---|---|---|---|---|---|---|
| Ajah Pritchard-Lolo | Women's −81 kg | 89 | 12 | 108 | 11 | 197 | 11 |
