= Vanuatu at the 2004 Summer Olympics =

- IOC code: VAN
- NOC: Vanuatu Association of Sports and National Olympic Committee
- Website: www.oceaniasport.com/vanuatu

in Athens
- Competitors: 2 in 1 sport
- Flag bearer: Moses Kamut
- Medals: Gold 0 Silver 0 Bronze 0 Total 0

Summer Olympics appearances (overview)
- 1988; 1992; 1996; 2000; 2004; 2008; 2012; 2016; 2020; 2024

Vanuatu competed at the 2004 Summer Olympics in Athens, Greece, which was held from 13 to 29 August 2004. The nation's appearance at the 2004 Athens Games marked its fifth appearance at the Summer Olympics since its debut at the 1988 Summer Olympics.

Two track and field athletes, Moses Kamut and Katura Marae, were selected to represent the nation via wildcards, as the nation had no athletes that met either the "A" or "B" qualifying standards. Kamut was selected as flag bearer for the opening ceremony. Marae was notable for being the youngest competitor in Athletics for this Summer Olympics, and for being the youngest ever athlete to represent Vanuatu at the Olympics, aged 14 years and 261 days. The latter is a record which still stands today.

Neither of the two athletes progressed beyond the heats, both of whom finishing last in their heats, therefore meaning that Vanuatu won no medals in this Summer Olympics. Despite this, Kamut and Marae both achieved seasonal best times for their events, the 400 meters and the 100 meters respectively.

== Background ==
Vanuatu participated in five Summer Olympic games between its debut in the 1988 Summer Olympics in Seoul, South Korea and the 2004 Summer Olympics in Athens. Vanuatu would participate in the Summer Olympics from 13 to 29 August 2004. No Vanuatu athlete had ever won a medal at the Summer Olympics before the 2004 Athens Games.

The Vanuatu National Olympic Committee (NOC) selected two athletes via wildcards. Usually a NOC would be able to select up to three athletes per event providing that each athlete passed the "A" standard time for that event. If no athletes met the "A" standard, then the NOC would be able to select one athlete for the event, providing that they pass the "B" standard time for the event in question. However, since Vanuatu had no athletes that met either standard for any event, they were allowed to select their best two athletes, one of each gender, to represent the nation at the Games. This was to make sure that every nation had a minimum of two representatives in the Summer Olympics. The two athletes that were selected to compete in the Athens games were Moses Kamut in the Men's 400 meters and Katura Marae in the Women's 100 meters.

Along with the two athletes, the Vanuatu Olympic team consisted of Chef De Mission Michel Mainguy, VASANOC President Joe Bomal Carlo, and VASANOC Secretary General, Seru Korikalo. Ancel Nalau, who represented Vanuatu at the 1992 Summer Olympics in the Men's 1500 meters, coached Kamut and Marae for the Athens Games. Kamut was selected as flag bearer for the opening ceremony.

== Athletics ==
Making his Summer Olympics debut, Moses Kamut was notable for carrying the Vanuatu flag at the opening ceremony. He qualified for the Athens Games via a wildcard place as his best time, 48.36 seconds at the 2004 Oceania Athletics Championships Men's 400 meters, was 2.41 seconds slower than the "B" qualifying standard required. He competed on 20 August in Heat 7 against seven other athletes. He ran a time of 48.14 seconds, finishing last despite achieving a seasonal best time. Pakistan's Sajid Muhammad ranked ahead of him (47.45 seconds) in a heat led by Jamaica's Michael Blackwood (45.23 seconds). Overall, Kamut placed 52 out of 63 athletes competing and was 2.26 seconds behind the slowest athlete that progressed to the semi-finals. Therefore, that was the end of his competition. Competing at her first Summer Olympics, Katura Marae was the youngest athlete in the 2004 Athens Games athletics and the youngest ever athlete to represent the nation aged 14 years and 261 days, the latter a record that still stands today. She qualified for the Athens Games after being granted a wildcard place, without competing in any notable sporting event. She competed on 20 August in the Women's 100 meters in Heat 1. She posted a time of 13.49 seconds, achieving a seasonal best time, but still finishing last of the 8 athletes that competed in the heat. Cambodia's Tit Linda Sou placed ahead of her (13.47 seconds) in a heat led by Jamaica's Aleen Bailey (11.20 seconds). Overall, Marae was 2.06 seconds behind the slowest athlete that progressed, therefore not advancing to the quarter-finals.

Key

- Note–Ranks given for track events are within the athlete's heat only
- Q = Qualified for the next round
- q = Qualified for the next round as a fastest loser or, in field events, by position without achieving the qualifying target
- NR = National record
- N/A = Round not applicable for the event
- Bye = Athlete not required to compete in round

Men

Athlete	Event	Heat		Semifinal		Final	
Athlete	Event	Result	Rank	Result	Rank	Result	Rank
Moses Kamut	400 m	48.14	8	Did not advance			

Women

Athlete	Event	Heat		Quarterfinal		Semifinal		Final	
Athlete	Event	Result	Rank	Result	Rank	Result	Rank	Result	Rank
Katura Marae	100 m	13.49	8	Did not advance					
