= Vanuatu at the 2012 Summer Paralympics =

- IPC code: VAN
- NPC: Vanuatu Paralympic Committee

in London
- Competitors: 1 in 1 sport
- Flag bearer: Marcel Houssimoli
- Medals: Gold 0 Silver 0 Bronze 0 Total 0

Summer Paralympics appearances (overview)
- 2000; 2004; 2008; 2012; 2016–2020; 2024

An interview with the Marcel Houssimoli and his coach in London

Vanuatu is participating in the 2012 Summer Paralympics in London, United Kingdom, from August 29 to September 9, 2012. The country initially hoped to send athletes to compete in wheelchair tennis and track and field. Ultimately, however, its delegation was to consist in only one athlete, Marcel Houssimoli, in three sprinting events. He was the country's flag-bearer during the Games' opening ceremony.

== Athletics ==
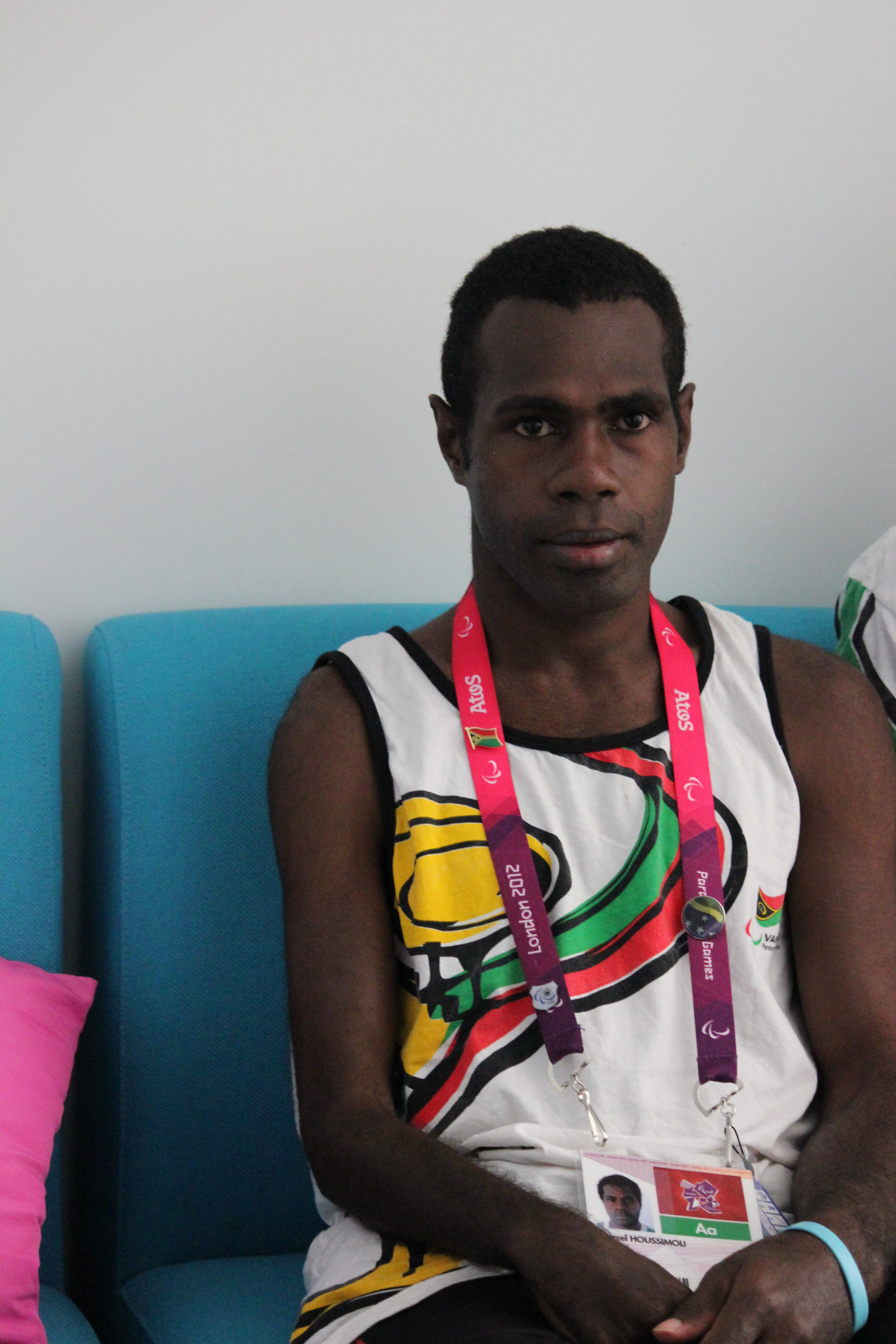
Marcel Houssimoli in London

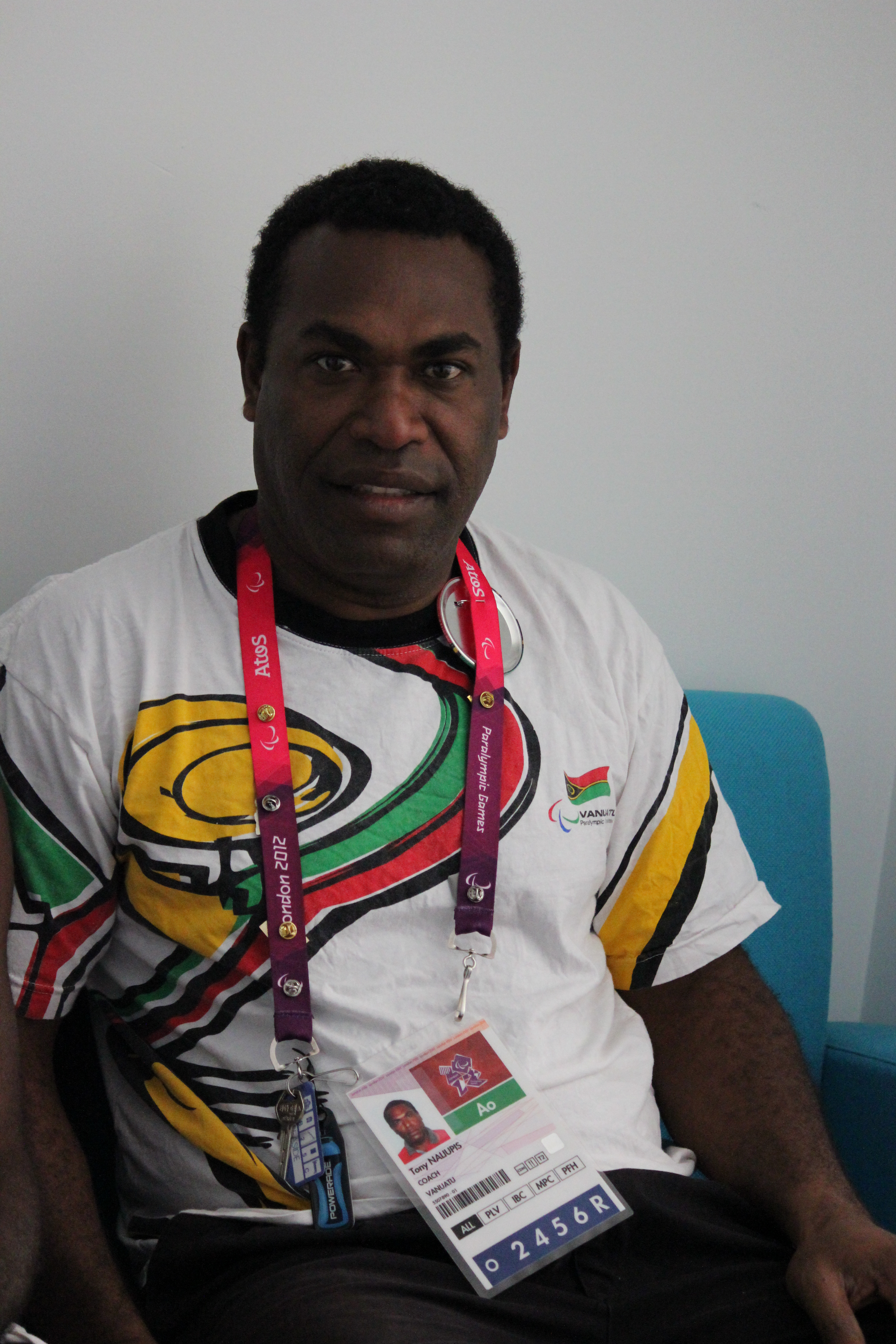
Marcel's coach in London

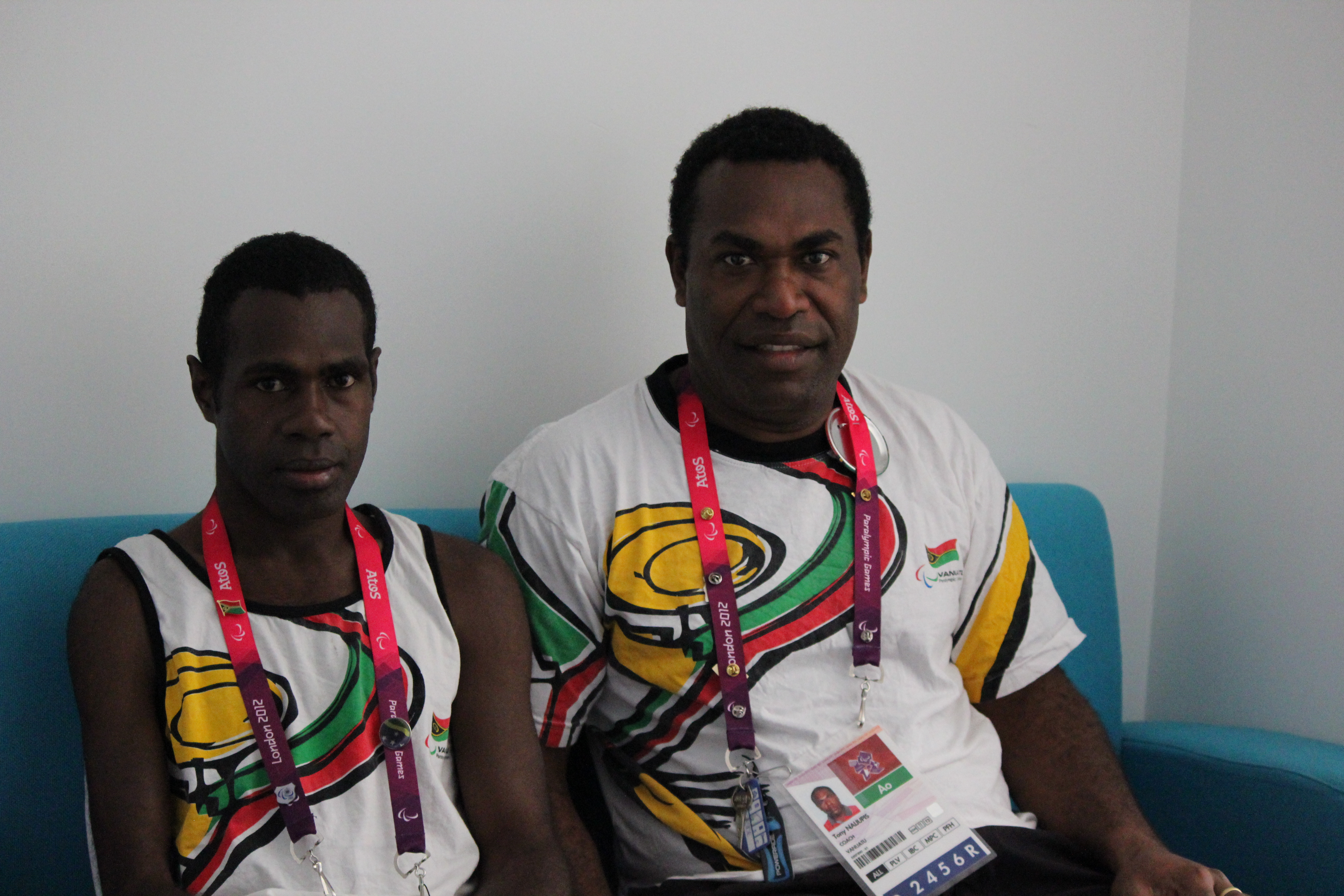
Marcel and his coach in London

Marcel Houssimoli, a right hand amputee, received a wildcard invitation to compete in the men's 100m and 200m in the T37 disability category, and in the men's 400m T38. As the country's only competitor, he was also the country's opening ceremonies flag bearer.

In heat 1 in the 200m, he finished sixth and last, in 30.12 s. He was the only athlete not to use the starting blocks, and finished more than five seconds behind fifth-placed Rhys Jones of Great Britain.

In heat 1 in the 400m, he finished fifth and last, in 1:09.03, more than fifteen seconds behind the other athletes; the crowd cheered him on to the finish line. He was the only T37 athlete in the race; his opponents, categorised T38, had a lower level of disability. Despite his slow time, he qualified for the final as a fastest loser. He finished seventh and last in the final, improving his time to 1:07.61, fourteen seconds behind sixth-placed Marius Stander of South Africa.

In heat 1 in the 100m, he finished 9th and last, in 14.55.

Men's Track and Road Events

Athlete	Event	Heat		Final	
Athlete	Event	Result	Rank	Result	Rank
Marcel Houssimoli	100m T37	14.55	9	did not advance	
Marcel Houssimoli	200m T37	30.12	6	did not advance	
Marcel Houssimoli	400m T38	1:09.03	5 q	1:07.61	7

== See also ==
- Summer Paralympic disability classification
- Vanuatu at the Paralympics
- Vanuatu at the 2012 Summer Olympics
