= Hamza Abdouh =

Palestinian swimmer

Hamse Abdouh
Personal information
- Nationality: Palestine
- Born: January 1, 1991 (age 35)

Sport
- Sport: Swimming

Hamse Ziyad Abdouh (or Hamza Abdu, Arabic: حمزة عبده) (born January 1, 1991), is a Palestinian swimmer from Jerusalem.

== Career ==
He represented Palestine at the 2008 Summer Olympics in Beijing. In the lead-up to the Games, the Australian Broadcasting Corporation reported on the difficulties he faced in training for the Olympics, having only an 18-metre pool at his disposal rather than a standard Olympic-sized 50 metre pool. His coach, while noting the support of the Israeli Swimming Association, lamented the travel restrictions imposed on Palestinians citizens by the Israeli occupation and lack of Palestinian funding, which had hampered his training. The British newspaper The Guardian described him, along with Vanuatu's Elis Lapenmal, as one of the Games' "underdogs", and as such he has also been described as a "potential successor to [Eric] Moussambani".

Abdouh is the Palestinian record holder for the 100-metre freestyle and 100-metre butterfly. His personal best in the 100-metre freestyle is 56 seconds. He has said that he was inspired to become an Olympic swimmer by his cousin Raed Awisat, who swam for Palestine at the 2004 Summer Olympics in Athens. He lives in East Jerusalem.
