= Vanuatu at the 2000 Summer Olympics =

- IOC code: VAN
- NOC: Vanuatu Association of Sports and National Olympic Committee
- Website: www.oceaniasport.com/vanuatu

in Sydney
- Competitors: 3 (2 men, 1 woman) in 2 sports
- Flag bearer: Mary-Estelle Mahuk
- Medals: Gold 0 Silver 0 Bronze 0 Total 0

Summer Olympics appearances (overview)
- 1988; 1992; 1996; 2000; 2004; 2008; 2012; 2016; 2020; 2024

Vanuatu was represented at the 2000 Summer Olympics in Sydney, New South Wales, Australia by the Vanuatu Association of Sports and National Olympic Committee.

In total, three athletes including two men and one woman represented Vanuatu in two different sports including archery and athletics.

== Competitors ==
In total, three athletes represented Vanuatu at the 2000 Summer Olympics in Sydney, New South Wales, Australia across two different sports.

Sport	Men	Women	Total
Archery	1	0	1
Athletics	1	1	2
Total	2	1	3

== Archery ==
In total, one Vanuatuan athlete participated in the archery events – Francois Latil in the men's individual.

The archery events took place at Sydney International Archery Park in Sydney Olympic Park, Sydney from 16–22 September 2000.

The ranking round for the men's individual took place on 16 September 2000. Latil scored 546 points and was ranked 61st. The first round matches took place two days later. Latil lost to the Rodney White of the United States by 158–145.

Athlete	Event	Ranking round		Round of 64	Round of 32	Round of 16	Quarterfinals	Semifinals	Final / BM	
Athlete	Event	Score	Seed	Opposition Score	Opposition Score	Opposition Score	Opposition Score	Opposition Score	Opposition Score	Rank
Francois Latil	Men's individual	546	61	Rodney White (USA); L 145–158	Did not advance					

== Athletics ==
In total, two Vanuatuan athletes participated in the athletics events – Mary-Estelle Kapalu in the women's 400 m hurdles and Abraham Kepsin in the men's 100 m.

The athletics events took place at Sydney Olympic Stadium in Sydney Olympic Park, Sydney from 22 September – 1 October 2000.

The heats for the men's 100 m took place on 22 September 2000. Kepsin finished eighth in his heat in a time of 11.12 seconds. He did not advance to the quarter-finals.

The heats for the women's 400 m hurdles took place on 24 September 2000. Kapalu finished fifth in her heat in a time of one minute 2.68 seconds. She did not advance to the quarter-finals.

Athlete	Events	Heat		Quarterfinal		Semifinal		Final	
Athlete	Events	Time	Position	Time	Position	Time	Position	Time	Position
Abraham Kepsin	Men's 100 m	11.12	8	Did not advance					
Mary-Estelle Kapalu	Women's 400 m hurdles	1:02.68	5	—		Did not advance			

== See also ==
- Vanuatu at the 2000 Summer Paralympics
