= Xue Li =

Xue Li may refer to:

- Xue Li (Han dynasty) (薛禮; died 195), Chinese military officer serving under the Eastern Han dynasty warlord Liu Yao
- Xue Rengui (614–683), formal name Xue Li, Chinese general during the early Tang dynasty

== See also ==
- Li Xue (born 1985), Chinese born French table tennis player
