= Vanuatu at the 2024 Summer Paralympics =

- Flag of Vanuatu
- IPC code: VAN
- NPC: Vanuatu Paralympic Committee

in Paris, France August 28, 2024 – September 8, 2024
- Competitors: 2 (1 man and 1 woman) in 1 sport
- Flag bearers: Elie Enock; Ken Kahu
- Medals: Gold 0 Silver 0 Bronze 0 Total 0

Summer Paralympics appearances (overview)
- 2000; 2004; 2008; 2012; 2016–2020; 2024

Vanuatu competed at the 2024 Summer Paralympics in Paris, France, from 28 August to 8 September 2024.

== Competitors ==
The following is the list of number of competitors in the Games.

Sport	Men	Women	Total
Athletics	1	1	2
Total	1	1	2

== Athletics ==
Men

Athlete	Event	Qualification		Final	
Athlete	Event	Result	Rank	Result	Rank
Ken Kahu	Men's javelin throw F64	—		52.01 PB	9
Elie Enock	Women's shot put F57	DNS		7.27 SB	11

== See also ==
- Vanuatu at the 2024 Summer Olympics
- Vanuatu at the Paralympics
