= Vanuatu at the 1996 Summer Olympics =

- IOC code: VAN
- NOC: Vanuatu Association of Sports and National Olympic Committee
- Website: www.oceaniasport.com/vanuatu

in Atlanta
- Competitors: 4 in 1 sport
- Flag bearer: Tawai Keiruan
- Medals: Gold 0 Silver 0 Bronze 0 Total 0

Summer Olympics appearances (overview)
- 1988; 1992; 1996; 2000; 2004; 2008; 2012; 2016; 2020; 2024

Vanuatu competed at the 1996 Summer Olympics in Atlanta, United States. It was their third appearance at the Summer Olympics, after debuting in 1988.

== Athletics ==
Men

=== Track events ===
Athlete	Events	Heat		Quarterfinal		Semifinal		Final	
Athlete	Events	Time	Position	Time	Position	Time	Position	Time	Position
Laurence Jack	200 m	21.94	6	Did not advance					
Tavakalo Kailes	800 m	1:55.07	7	n/a		Did not advance			
Tawai Keiruan	1500 m	4:02.78	11	n/a		Did not advance			

Women

=== Track events ===
Athlete	Events	Heat		Semifinal		Final	
Athlete	Events	Time	Position	Time	Position	Time	Position
Mary-Estelle Kapalu	400 m hurdles	58.68	6	Did not advance			
