= Singapore at the 2012 Summer Olympics =

- IOC code: SIN
- NOC: Singapore National Olympic Council
- Website: www.singaporeolympics.com

in London
- Competitors: 23 in 9 sports
- Flag bearers: Feng Tianwei (opening); Colin Cheng (closing)
- Medals Ranked 75th: Gold 0 Silver 0 Bronze 2 Total 2

Summer Olympics appearances (overview)
- 1948; 1952; 1956; 1960; 1964; 1968; 1972; 1976; 1980; 1984; 1988; 1992; 1996; 2000; 2004; 2008; 2012; 2016; 2020; 2024; 2028

Singapore competed at the 2012 Summer Olympics in London, from July 27 to August 12, 2012. This was the nation's fifteenth appearance at the Olympics, except for two different editions. Singapore was part of the Malaysian team at the 1964 Summer Olympics in Tokyo, but did not attend at the 1980 Summer Olympics in Moscow, because of its support for the United States boycott.

The Singapore National Olympic Council sent a total of 23 athletes to the Games, 8 men and 15 women, to compete in 9 sports. For the second time in its Olympic history, Singapore was represented by more female than male athletes. Seven Singaporean athletes had competed in Beijing, including swimmer Tao Li, who finished fifth in the women's butterfly event. Among the sports played by the athletes, Singapore also marked its Olympic debut in sprint canoeing and artistic gymnastics.

This was Singapore's most successful Olympics after winning two bronze medals in table tennis. Feng Tianwei, who claimed the bronze for the women's singles event, became the first Singaporean athlete to win an individual medal since 1960. Feng also led her compatriots Li Jiawei and Wang Yuegu to take another Olympic bronze medal for Singapore in the women's team event against South Korea.

== Medalists ==
| Medal | Name | Sport | Event | Date |
|---|---|---|---|---|
| Bronze | Feng Tianwei | Table tennis | Women's singles | 1 August |
| Bronze | Feng Tianwei; Li Jiawei; Wang Yuegu | Table tennis | Women's team | 7 August |

== Athletics ==
Key

- Note–Ranks given for track events are within the athlete's heat only
- Q = Qualified for the next round
- q = Qualified for the next round as a fastest loser or, in field events, by position without achieving the qualifying target
- NR = National record
- N/A = Round not applicable for the event
- Bye = Athlete not required to compete in round

Men

| Athlete | Event | Heat | | Quarterfinal | | Semifinal | | Final | |
| Athlete | Event | Result | Rank | Result | Rank | Result | Rank | Result | Rank |
|---|---|---|---|---|---|---|---|---|---|
| Yeo Foo Ee Gary | 100 m | 10.57 | 2 Q | 10.69 | 8 | Did not advance | | | |

Women

| Athlete | Event | Heat | | Semifinal | | Final | |
| Athlete | Event | Result | Rank | Result | Rank | Result | Rank |
|---|---|---|---|---|---|---|---|
| Dipna Lim Prasad | 100 m hurdles | 14.68 | 7 | Did not advance | | | |

== Badminton ==
| Athlete | Event | Group Stage | | | | Elimination | Quarterfinal | Semifinal | Final / BM | |
| Athlete | Event | Opposition Score | Opposition Score | Opposition Score | Rank | Opposition Score | Opposition Score | Opposition Score | Opposition Score | Rank |
|---|---|---|---|---|---|---|---|---|---|---|
| Derek Wong Zi Liang | Men's singles | Zilberman (ISR); W (21–9, 21–15) | Jørgensen (DEN); L (14–21, 17–21) | —N/a | 2 | Did not advance | | | | |
| Gu Juan | Women's singles | Fašungová (SVK); W (21–5, 21–11) | Na (AUS); W (21–10, 21–7) | —N/a | 1 Q | Cheng S-c (TPE); L (18–21, 10–21) | Did not advance | | | |
| Shinta Mulia Sari; Yao Lei | Women's doubles | Cheng W-h / Chien Y-c (TPE); L (21–18, 15–21, 15–21) | Fujii / Kakiiwa (JPN); L (21–16, 19–21, 10–21) | Gutta / Ponnappa (IND); L (16–21, 15–21) | 4 | —N/a | Did not advance | | | |

== Canoeing ==
Singapore has qualified one athlete for the women's events. This is the first time a Singaporean canoeist has qualified for the Olympics. Geraldine managed to qualify for the semi-finals for the K-1 500 m event. She was eventually placed twenty-first out of 24 competitors in the event, beating her own target of bettering at least one other country.

| Athlete | Event | Heats | | Semifinals | | Final | |
| Athlete | Event | Time | Rank | Time | Rank | Time | Rank |
|---|---|---|---|---|---|---|---|
| Geraldine Lee Wei Ling | Women's K-1 200 m | 45.552 | 8 | Did not advance | | | |
| Geraldine Lee Wei Ling | Women's K-1 500 m | 2:01.037 | 4 Q | 2:01.516 | 7 | Did not advance | |

Qualification Legend: FA = Qualify to final (medal); FB = Qualify to final B (non-medal)

== Gymnastics ==
=== Artistic ===
Lim Heem Wei is the only Singaporean gymnast to qualify for the 2012 Summer Olympics, and the first ever Singaporean gymnast to qualify for an Olympics. She eventually achieved the forty-fifth position in the Women's artistic qualification event.

Women

| Athlete | Event | Qualification | | | | | | Final | | | | | |
| Athlete | Event | Apparatus | | | | Total | Rank | Apparatus | | | | Total | Rank |
| Athlete | Event | F | V | UB | BB | Total | Rank | F | V | UB | BB | Total | Rank |
|---|---|---|---|---|---|---|---|---|---|---|---|---|---|
| Lim Heem Wei | All-around | 12.033 | 13.333 | 12.400 | 13.033 | 50.799 | 45 | Did not advance | | | | | |

== Sailing ==
Singapore had qualified 1 boat each for the Men's Laser and Women's Laser Radial categories.

Men

| Athlete | Event | Race | | | | | | | | | | | Net points | Final rank |
| Athlete | Event | 1 | 2 | 3 | 4 | 5 | 6 | 7 | 8 | 9 | 10 | M* | Net points | Final rank |
|---|---|---|---|---|---|---|---|---|---|---|---|---|---|---|
| Colin Cheng Xin Ru | Laser | 4 | 25 | 26 | 20 | 28 | ~~34~~ | 10 | 2 | 17 | 14 | EL | 145 | 15 |

Women

| Athlete | Event | Race | | | | | | | | | | | Net points | Final rank |
| Athlete | Event | 1 | 2 | 3 | 4 | 5 | 6 | 7 | 8 | 9 | 10 | M* | Net points | Final rank |
|---|---|---|---|---|---|---|---|---|---|---|---|---|---|---|
| Elizabeth Yin Yue Ling | Laser Radial | ~~34~~ | 27 | 29 | 13 | 28 | 12 | 26 | 18 | 19 | 25 | EL | 197 | 24 |

M = Medal race; EL = Eliminated – did not advance into the medal race;

== Shooting ==
Women

| Athlete | Event | Qualification | | Final | |
| Athlete | Event | Points | Rank | Points | Rank |
|---|---|---|---|---|---|
| Jasmine Ser Xiang Wei | 50 m rifle 3 positions | 577 | 29 | Did not advance | |
| Jasmine Ser Xiang Wei | 10 m air rifle | 394 | 24 | Did not advance | |

== Swimming ==
Singaporean swimmers have so far achieved qualifying standards in the following events (up to a maximum of 2 swimmers in each event at the Olympic Qualifying Time (OQT), and 1 at the Olympic Selection Time (OST)):

Singaporean swimmers were all coached by Sergio López Miró, a swimmer competing for Spain who won the bronze medal in the men's 200 m breaststroke event at the 1988 Summer Olympics in Seoul.

Men

| Athlete | Event | Heat | | Semifinal | | Final | |
| Athlete | Event | Time | Rank | Time | Rank | Time | Rank |
|---|---|---|---|---|---|---|---|
| Quah Zheng Wen | 200 m backstroke | 2:03.45 | 35 | Did not advance | | | |
| Quah Zheng Wen | 400 m individual medley | 4:26.81 | 33 | —N/a | | Did not advance | |
| Joseph Schooling | 100 m butterfly | 53.63 | 35 | Did not advance | | | |
| Joseph Schooling | 200 m butterfly | 1:59.18 | 26 | Did not advance | | | |

Women

| Athlete | Event | Heat | | Semifinal | | Final | |
| Athlete | Event | Time | Rank | Time | Rank | Time | Rank |
|---|---|---|---|---|---|---|---|
| Lynette Lim | 400 m freestyle | 4:18.64 | 30 | —N/a | | Did not advance | |
| Lynette Lim | 800 m freestyle | 8:52.92 | 31 | —N/a | | Did not advance | |
| Mylene Ong | 100 m freestyle | 56.33 | 29 | Did not advance | | | |
| Tao Li | 100 m backstroke | 1:01.60 | 26 | Did not advance | | | |
| Tao Li | 100 m butterfly | 58.34 | 11 Q | 58.18 | 10 | Did not advance | |

== Table tennis ==
Singapore has qualified four athletes for singles table tennis events. Based on their world rankings as of 16 May 2011 Gao Ning and Yang Zi have qualified for the men's event; Feng Tianwei and Wang Yuegu have qualified for the women's. In the Southeast Asian Qualification Tournament Singapore won a third spot in the men's (Zhan Jian) and the women's (Li Jiawei), however they can not compete in the singles event due to only a maximum of 2 athletes per gender being allowed, though they will compete in the team event. Singapore Table Tennis Association has set a target of 2 medals in this event, 1 more than what they achieved at the 2008 Summer Olympics.

Feng Tianwei won the bronze medal for the women's singles event, becoming the first Singaporean athlete to win an individual medal since the 1960 Summer Olympics, where weightlifter Tan Howe Liang won a silver medal.

Li Jiawei, Feng Tianwei and Wang Yuegu's win against South Korea for the women's team Bronze medal match marks the first Olympics in Singapore's history where more than one medal were won consecutively in a single Olympics.

Men

| Athlete | Event | Preliminary round | Round 1 | Round 2 | Round 3 | Round 4 | Quarterfinals | Semifinals | Final / BM | |
| Athlete | Event | Opposition Result | Opposition Result | Opposition Result | Opposition Result | Opposition Result | Opposition Result | Opposition Result | Opposition Result | Rank |
|---|---|---|---|---|---|---|---|---|---|---|
| Gao Ning | Singles | Bye | | | Tokič (SLO); W (4–0) | Wang H (CHN); L (1–4) | Did not advance | | | |
| Yang Zi | Singles | Bye | | Drinkhall (GBR); L (1–4) | Did not advance | | | | | |
| Gao Ning; Yang Zi; Zhan Jian | Team | —N/a | | | | Australia; W (3–0) | China; L (0–3) | Did not advance | | |

Women

| Athlete | Event | Preliminary round | Round 1 | Round 2 | Round 3 | Round 4 | Quarterfinals | Semifinals | Final / BM | |
| Athlete | Event | Opposition Result | Opposition Result | Opposition Result | Opposition Result | Opposition Result | Opposition Result | Opposition Result | Opposition Result | Rank |
|---|---|---|---|---|---|---|---|---|---|---|
| Feng Tianwei | Singles | Bye | | | Chen S-Y (TPE); W (4–1) | Wu Jd (GER); W (4–2) | Kim K-A (KOR); W (4–2) | Ding N (CHN); L (2–4) | Ishikawa (JPN); W (4–0) | 3rd place, bronze medalist(s) |
| Wang Yuegu | Singles | Bye | | | Xian Yf (FRA); W (4–0) | Pavlovich (BLR); W (4–3) | Ishikawa (JPN); L (1–4) | Did not advance | | |
| Feng Tianwei; Li Jiawei; Wang Yuegu | Team | —N/a | | | | Poland; W (3–1) | North Korea; W (3–0) | Japan; L (0–3) | South Korea; W (3–0) | 3rd place, bronze medalist(s) |

== Weightlifting ==
Singapore has qualified 1 athlete.

| Athlete | Event | Snatch | | Clean & Jerk | | Total | Rank |
| Athlete | Event | Result | Rank | Result | Rank | Total | Rank |
|---|---|---|---|---|---|---|---|
| Helena Wong Kar Mun | Women's −53 kg | 61 | 16 | 73 | 15 | 134 | 15 |

== See also ==
- Singapore at the 2012 Summer Paralympics
