= Vanuatu at the 2000 Summer Paralympics =

Vanuatu at the 2008 Summer Paralympics
- IPC code: VAN
- NPC: Vanuatu Paralympic Committee

in Beijing
- Competitors: 2 in 1 sport
- Medals: Gold 0 Silver 0 Bronze 0 Total 0

Summer Paralympics appearances (overview)
- 2000; 2004; 2008; 2012; 2016–2020; 2024

Vanuatu competed at the 2000 Summer Paralympics in Sydney. The country made its Paralympic début by sending two athletes to compete in javelin events. Neither won a medal.

== Athletics ==
Name	Event	Result	Rank
George Kalkaua	Men's Javelin F58	28.06 m	6th (out of 7)
Mary Mali Ramel	Women's Javelin F44	18.99 m	5th (out of 5)

== See also ==
- 2000 Summer Paralympics
- Vanuatu at the Paralympics
- Vanuatu at the 2000 Summer Olympics
