= Francois Latil =

Vanuatuan archer (born 1938)

François Latil (born June 10, 1938) is a ni-Vanuatu archer, and retired lawyer.

He was the first person to represent Vanuatu in archery at the Olympic Games, when he competed at the 2000 Summer Olympics in Sydney. He qualified on merit for the Games. At the age of 62, he was also the oldest competitor, of any nationality and in any sport, at the Sydney Games. (The youngest was 12-year-old Fatema Gerashi of Bahrain.)

Latil was eliminated in the first round of the competition.

He is the father-in-law of Laurent Thibault.
