= Vanuatu at the 2016 Summer Olympics =

- IOC code: VAN
- NOC: Vanuatu Association of Sports and National Olympic Committee
- Website: www.oceaniasport.com/vanuatu

in Rio de Janeiro
- Competitors: 4 in 4 sports
- Flag bearer: Yoshua Shing
- Medals: Gold 0 Silver 0 Bronze 0 Total 0

Summer Olympics appearances (overview)
- 1988; 1992; 1996; 2000; 2004; 2008; 2012; 2016; 2020; 2024; 2028

Vanuatu competed at the 2016 Summer Olympics in Rio de Janeiro, Brazil, from 5 to 21 August 2016. This was the nation's eighth consecutive appearance at the Summer Olympics.

The Vanuatu Association of Sports and National Olympic Committee (VASNOC) selected a quartet of male athletes to compete each in boxing, judo, rowing, and table tennis at the Games, failing to register any female athletes for the first time in its Summer Olympic history. All of Vanuatu's competitors made their Olympic debut in Rio de Janeiro, except for table tennis player Yoshua Shing, who attended the London Games four years earlier. The most experienced competitor of the roster, Shing was given the honor of carrying the Vanuatu flag at the opening ceremony.

Vanuatu, however, has yet to win its first ever Olympic medal, as none of these athletes progressed beyond the first round of their respective sporting events.

== Background ==
Vanuatu's opening ceremony flag bearer was Yoshua Shing. It was the third consecutive Olympics that a table tennis player was the flag bearer for Vanuatu. The country did not have a closing ceremony flag bearer, and a volunteer performed the task.

Vanuatu's first Olympics was in 1988, and has appeared in every Olympic Games since. As of these Olympics, Vanuatu has not won an Olympic medal.

== Boxing ==
Vanuatu received an invitation from the Tripartite Commission to send a male boxer competing in the bantamweight division to the Games, signifying the nation's return to the sport for the first time since 1988.

Warawara fought Russian Vladimir Nikitin in the Round of 32. Warawara lost by unanimous decision, with all three rounds going to Nikitin, with scores of 28-29, 26-30 and 27-30. Near the end of the final round, the match was stopped due to a cut on Nikitin's head. Warawara's corner did not believe the judges scored the match fairly. After the fight, Warawara posted on Facebook, "Congratulations to Vladimir Nikitin! Thank you for the experience of fighting a top 3 world ranked boxer. I will be back, but only bigger and better ! Best of luck in the medal rounds."

| Athlete | Event | Round of 32 | Round of 16 | Quarterfinals | Semifinals | Final | |
| Athlete | Event | Opposition Result | Opposition Result | Opposition Result | Opposition Result | Opposition Result | Rank |
|---|---|---|---|---|---|---|---|
| Lionel Warawara | Men's bantamweight | Nikitin (RUS); L 0–3 | did not advance | | | | |

== Judo ==
Vanuatu has qualified one judoka for the men's half-lightweight category (66 kg) at the Games. Joe Mahit earned a continental quota spot from the Oceania region as Vanuatu's top-ranked judoka outside of direct qualifying position in the IJF World Ranking List of May 30, 2016.

| Athlete | Event | Round of 64 | Round of 32 | Round of 16 | Quarterfinals | Semifinals | Repechage | Final / BM | |
| Athlete | Event | Opposition Result | Opposition Result | Opposition Result | Opposition Result | Opposition Result | Opposition Result | Opposition Result | Rank |
|---|---|---|---|---|---|---|---|---|---|
| Joe Mahit | Men's −66 kg | Bye | Mata (ARU); L 000–100 | did not advance | | | | | |

== Rowing ==
Vanuatu has received an invitation from the Tripartite Commission to send a rower in the men's single sculls to the Rio regatta, signifying the nation's Olympic debut in the sport.

| Athlete | Event | Heats | | Repechage | | Quarterfinals | | Semifinals | | Final | |
| Athlete | Event | Time | Rank | Time | Rank | Time | Rank | Time | Rank | Time | Rank |
|---|---|---|---|---|---|---|---|---|---|---|---|
| Luigi Teilemb | Men's single sculls | 8:00.42 | 6 R | 7:34.12 | 3 SE/F | Bye | | 8:19.15 | 3 FE | 8:24.67 | 30 |

Qualification Legend: FA=Final A (medal); FB=Final B (non-medal); FC=Final C (non-medal); FD=Final D (non-medal); FE=Final E (non-medal); FF=Final F (non-medal); SA/B=Semifinals A/B; SC/D=Semifinals C/D; SE/F=Semifinals E/F; QF=Quarterfinals; R=Repechage

== Table tennis ==
Vanuatu has entered one athlete into the table tennis competition at the Games. 2012 Olympian Yoshua Shing picked up an unused berth freed by New Zealand to round out the top three in the men's singles at the 2016 Oceania Qualification Tournament in Bendigo, Australia.

Shing lost in the preliminary round to Marcos Madrid, 0-4.

| Athlete | Event | Preliminary | Round 1 | Round 2 | Round 3 | Round of 16 | Quarterfinals | Semifinals | Final / BM | |
| Athlete | Event | Opposition Result | Opposition Result | Opposition Result | Opposition Result | Opposition Result | Opposition Result | Opposition Result | Opposition Result | Rank |
|---|---|---|---|---|---|---|---|---|---|---|
| Yoshua Shing | Men's singles | Madrid (MEX); L 0–4 | did not advance | | | | | | | |
