= Sarah Hanffou =

Cameroonian table tennis player

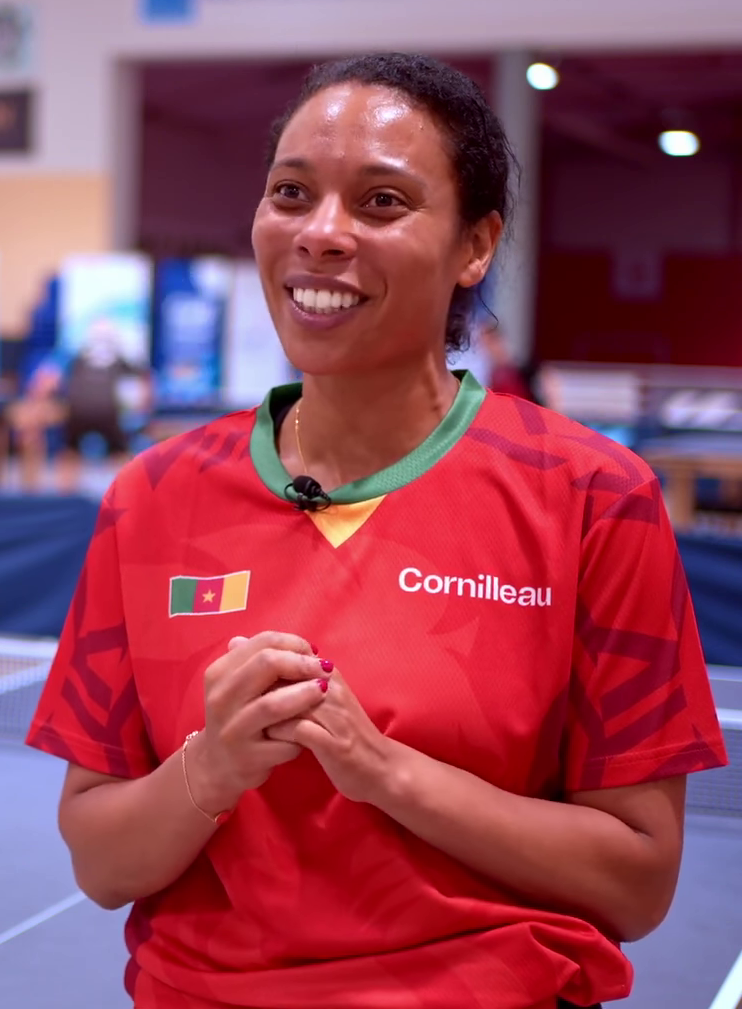
Sarah Hanffou in 2024

Sarah Hanffou (born 8 October 1986, in Roubaix, France) is a Cameroonian table tennis player. She competed at the 2012 Summer Olympics in the women's singles. She beat Tvin Moumjoghlian in the preliminary round, before losing 4 - 1 to Xian Yi Fang in the first round proper.

In November 2015, Hanffou received the Athletes in Excellence Award from The Foundation for Global Sports Development, in recognition of her community service efforts and work with youth. Since 2018, she also counts among the ITTF Foundation ambassadors to help raise awareness of social issues, and use her talent and status to bring about positive social changes.

She qualified to represent Cameroon at the 2020 Summer Olympics.
