= Katura Marae =

Vanuatuan sprinter

Personal information
- Born: December 3, 1989 (age 36)
- Height: 1.6 m (5 ft 3 in)
- Weight: 53 kg (117 lb)

Sport
- Country: Vanuatu
- Sport: Athletics
- Event: 100 metres

Katura Lavinia Marae (born December 3, 1989) is a ni-Vanuatu athlete who specializes in the 100 metres.

She represented her country at the 2004 Summer Olympics in Athens, competing in the women's 100 metres sprint. She finished last in her heat, with a time of 13.49 seconds.

Marea was pleased with her performance: "I am so excited! Being here is just as wonderful as winning a gold medal. Thank you, thank you to everyone". At 14 years and 261 days she was the youngest track and field athlete competing at the 2004 Olympics.
