= Elis Lapenmal =

Vanuatuan sprinter

Personal information
- Born: September 6, 1987 (age 38)
- Height: 1.6 m (5 ft 3 in)

Sport
- Country: Vanuatu
- Sport: Athletics
- Event: 100m

Elis Lapenmal (born 6 September 1987 in Malakula) is a Ni-Vanuatu sprinter.

Competing at the World Athletics Championships in 2007, Lapenmal ran the 100 metres in 13.10 seconds. She won a silver medal at the South Pacific Mini Games, and qualified as a "wildcard entry" to represent Vanuatu in the 100 metres event at the 2008 Summer Olympics in Beijing.

Prior to the Beijing Games, the British newspaper The Guardian described her, along with Palestine's Hamza Abdu, as one of the Games' "underdogs", and as such she has also been described as a "potential successor to (Eric) Moussambani". In her first round heat in Beijing she placed eighth and last in a time of 13.31 which was not enough to advance to the second round.
