= 2012 World Team Table Tennis Championships =

2012 edition of the World Team Table Tennis Championships

- Venue: Westfalenhallen
- Location: Dortmund, Germany
- Dates: 25 March–1 April

Champions
- Men: China
- Women: China

The 2012 Liebherr World Team Table Tennis Championships were held at the Westfalenhallen in Dortmund, Germany from March 25 to April 1, 2012. It was the 51st edition to be contested. 120 men's teams and 92 women's teams were allocated to different divisions according to the final ranking of the previous World Team Table Tennis Championships and the ITTF World Team Rankings. The winner of the first division, called the Championship Division, was crowned as the new champion.

To be eligible to have a team entered for the team events in 2012 Summer Olympics, the ITTF member association must have participated in the tournament. The ranking of the 2012 Championships was taken into account for the Olympic qualification after the final world Olympic qualification tournament, which was held from May 10 to May 13.

== Seeding ==
The Championship Division comprised 24 teams. The top 18 teams of the Championship Division at the 2010 World Team Championships were guaranteed a spot in the championship division. The top two teams of the Second Division in 2010 automatically advanced to the Championship Division in 2012. The other four spots were announced according to the ITTF World Team Rankings published in February, 2012.

Qualification	Men's team	Women's team
Top eighteen in 2010	China; Germany; Japan; South Korea; Hong Kong; Russia; Belarus; Hungary; Czech Republic Austria; Sweden; Poland; North Korea; Portugal; Spain; Singapore; Chinese Taipei; Croatia	Singapore; China; Japan; Germany; South Korea; Hong Kong; Hungary; Netherlands; Chinese Taipei Poland; Croatia; Romania; North Korea; Russia; Spain; United States; Ukraine; Belarus
Top two of the 2nd Division in 2010	Serbia; Slovenia	Sweden; Turkey
ITTF World Team Rankings (ranking in February)	France (12); Greece (16); Denmark (20); Slovakia (21)	Czech Republic (14); Austria (19); Serbia (20); France (21)

== Medal summary ==
=== Events ===
Event	Gold	Silver	Bronze
Men's team	China; Ma Long; Zhang Jike; Wang Hao; Xu Xin; Ma Lin	Germany; Timo Boll; Dimitrij Ovtcharov; Patrick Baum; Bastian Steger; Christian Süß	South Korea; Joo Se-Hyuk; Ryu Seung-Min; Oh Sang-Eun; Kim Min-Seok; Jung Young-Sik
Men's team	China; Ma Long; Zhang Jike; Wang Hao; Xu Xin; Ma Lin	Germany; Timo Boll; Dimitrij Ovtcharov; Patrick Baum; Bastian Steger; Christian Süß	Japan; Jun Mizutani; Seiya Kishikawa; Koki Niwa; Kenji Matsudaira; Maharu Yoshimura
Women's team	China; Ding Ning; Liu Shiwen; Guo Yan; Li Xiaoxia; Guo Yue	Singapore; Feng Tianwei; Wang Yuegu; Li Jiawei; Sun Beibei; Yu Mengyu	Hong Kong; Tie Ya Na; Jiang Huajun; Lee Ho Ching; Ng Wing Nam; Yu Kwok See
Women's team	China; Ding Ning; Liu Shiwen; Guo Yan; Li Xiaoxia; Guo Yue	Singapore; Feng Tianwei; Wang Yuegu; Li Jiawei; Sun Beibei; Yu Mengyu	South Korea; Kim Kyung-Ah; Dang Ye-Seo; Seok Ha-Jung; Yang Ha-Eun; Park Mi-Young

=== Medal table ===
Rank	Nation	Gold	Silver	Bronze	Total
1	China	2	0	0	2
2	Germany	0	1	0	1
2	Singapore	0	1	0	1
4	South Korea	0	0	2	2
5	Hong Kong	0	0	1	1
5	Japan	0	0	1	1
Totals (6 entries)		2	2	4	8

== Results ==
=== Men's team ===
Ninth place
Hong Kong	3
Belarus	1
Eleventh place
Poland	1
Portugal	3

Consolation semifinals
Poland	1
Hong Kong	3
Belarus	3
Portugal	1

First round
Poland	1
Austria	3
Hong Kong	2
Chinese Taipei	3
Singapore	3
Belarus	1
Portugal	0
Sweden	3

Quarterfinals
China	3
Austria	0
Chinese Taipei	1
South Korea	3
Japan	3
Singapore	1
Sweden	0
Germany	3

Semifinals
China	3
South Korea	0
Japan	1
Germany	3
5th–8th classification
Austria	3
Chinese Taipei	0
Singapore	1
Sweden	3

Final
China	3
Germany	0
Third place
South Korea	X
Japan	X
Fifth place
Austria	3
Sweden	1
Seventh place
Chinese Taipei	3
Singapore	2

=== Women's team ===
First Round	Quarterfinals
China	3
Poland	3	Poland	0
Romania	2
Netherlands	3
Austria	1	Netherlands	0
Hong Kong	3
Japan	2
Hungary	0	South Korea	3
South Korea	3
Germany	3
North Korea	1	Germany	2
Singapore	3
Position 9–12
Romania	2	Austria	0
Austria	3	North Korea	3
Hungary	0	Romania	1
North Korea	3	Hungary	3

Semifinals	Final
China	3
Hong Kong	1
China	3
Singapore	0
South Korea	2
Singapore	3	Third Place
Hong Kong	X
South Korea	X
Position 5–8
Poland	1	Netherlands	0
Netherlands	3	Japan	3
Japan	3	Poland	2
Germany	0	Germany	3
