= Vanuatu at the 1988 Summer Olympics =

- IOC code: VAN
- NOC: Vanuatu Association of Sports and National Olympic Committee

in Seoul
- Competitors: 4 in 2 sports
- Flag bearer: Olivette Daruhi
- Medals: Gold 0 Silver 0 Bronze 0 Total 0

Summer Olympics appearances (overview)
- 1988; 1992; 1996; 2000; 2004; 2008; 2012; 2016; 2020; 2024

Vanuatu competed in the Olympic Games for the first time at the 1988 Summer Olympics in Seoul, South Korea.

== Competitors ==
The following is the list of number of competitors in the Games.

Sport	Men	Women	Total
Athletics	2	1	3
Boxing	1	–	1
Total	3	1	4

== Athletics ==
Track events
Men

Athlete	Events	Heat		Semifinal		Final	
Athlete	Events	Time	Position	Time	Position	Time	Position
Baptiste Firiam	400 m	51.77	73	Did not advance			
Jerry Jeremiah	100 m	10.96	82	Did not advance			
Jerry Jeremiah	200 m	22.01	55	Did not advance			

Women

Athlete	Events	Heat		Semifinal		Final	
Athlete	Events	Time	Position	Time	Position	Time	Position
Olivette Daruhi	100 m	13.00	7	Did not advance			
Olivette Daruhi	200 m	26.88	5	Did not advance			

== Boxing ==
Athlete	Event	Round of 64	Round of 32	Round of 16	Quarterfinals	Semifinals	Final
Athlete	Event	Opposition Result	Opposition Result	Opposition Result	Opposition Result	Opposition Result	Opposition Result
James Iahuat	Middleweight		Kabongo (ZAI); L RSCH	Did not advance			
Issac Iapatu	Light Middleweight		Abrar-Hussain Syed (PAK); L WO	Did not advance			
Edouard Paululum	Bantamweight	Alexandre Artemiev (URS); L WO	Did not advance				

- Iahuat's contest was stopped in the first round after 1 minute 13 seconds due to a head blow.
- Paululum was disqualified for being a pound overweight due to having a breakfast before the weigh-in.
