= Vanuatu at the Olympics =

- IOC code: VAN
- NOC: Vanuatu Association of Sports and National Olympic Committee
- Website: afcnovasanoc.wixsite.com/vasanoc
- Medals: Gold 0 Silver 0 Bronze 0 Total 0

Summer appearances
- 1988; 1992; 1996; 2000; 2004; 2008; 2012; 2016; 2020; 2024

Vanuatu first participated at the Olympic Games in 1988 and has sent athletes to compete in every Summer Olympic Games since then. The nation has never participated in the Winter Olympic Games.

The National Olympic Committee for Vanuatu was created in 1987 and recognized by the International Olympic Committee that same year.

As of 2024, no Vanuatuan athlete has ever won an Olympic medal.

Up to and including the 2020 Summer Olympics in Tokyo, Vanuatu have sent 34 athletes to the Games.

== Medal tables ==
=== Medals by Summer Games ===
Games	Athletes	Gold	Silver	Bronze	Total	Rank
(South Korea) 1988 Seoul	4	0	0	0	0	–
(Spain) 1992 Barcelona	6	0	0	0	0	–
(United States) 1996 Atlanta	4	0	0	0	0	–
(Australia) 2000 Sydney	3	0	0	0	0	–
(Greece) 2004 Athens	2	0	0	0	0	–
(China) 2008 Beijing	3	0	0	0	0	–
(United Kingdom) 2012 London	5	0	0	0	0	–
(Brazil) 2016 Rio de Janeiro	4	0	0	0	0	–
(Japan) 2020 Tokyo	3	0	0	0	0	–
(France) 2024 Paris	6	0	0	0	0	–
(United States) 2028 Los Angeles	future event					
(Australia) 2032 Brisbane	future event					
Total		0	0	0	0	–

== See also ==
- List of flag bearers for Vanuatu at the Olympics
- Category:Olympic competitors for Vanuatu
- Vanuatu at the Paralympics
