= Priscila Tommy =

Vanuatuan table tennis player

Personal information
- Born: 23 May 1991 (age 35) Espiritu Santo, Vanuatu
- Height: 1.71 m (5 ft 7 in)
- Weight: 65 kg (143 lb)

Sport
- Country: Vanuatu
- Sport: Table Tennis
Medal record
South Pacific Games
Gold medal – first place	2007 Apia	women's doubles
Gold medal – first place	2007 Apia	women's singles

Priscila Tommy (born 23 May 1991) is a ni-Vanuatu table tennis player.

She won gold in both the women's singles and team events at the 2007 South Pacific Games.

Tommy represented Vanuatu at the 2008 Summer Olympics in Beijing, and was her country's flag bearer at the opening ceremony. She faced Slovakia's Eva Odorova, ranked 762 places above her, in her opening game, and lost in straight sets.

Tommy was selected to represent Vanuatu at the 2010 Commonwealth Games in Delhi.

Tommy won a gold medal at the 2019 Pacific Games.

Olympic Games
Preceded by Moses Kamut	Flagbearer for Vanuatu; Beijing 2008	Succeeded by Anolyn Lulu
