= Vanuatu at the Paralympics =

- IPC code: VAN
- NPC: Vanuatu Paralympic Committee
- Medals: Gold 0 Silver 0 Bronze 0 Total 0

Summer appearances
- 2000; 2004; 2008; 2012; 2016–2020; 2024

Vanuatu first competed at the Summer Paralympic Games in 2000, sending two athletes to compete in javelin events. The country was absent from the 2004 Games, returning to the Paralympics in 2008. Vanuatu has never taken part in the Winter Paralympic Games, and no ni-Vanuatu athlete has ever won a Paralympic medal.

== Full results for Vanuatu at the Paralympics ==
Name	Games	Sport	Event	Score	Rank
George Kalkaua	2000 Sydney	Athletics	Men's Javelin F58	28.06 m	6th (out of 7)
Mary Mali Ramel	2000 Sydney	Athletics	Women's Javelin F44	18.99 m	5th (out of 5)
Tom Tete	2008 Beijing	Powerlifting	Men's up to 60 kg	80 kg	13th (out of 13)
Marcel Houssimoli	2012 London	Athletics	Men's 100 m T37	14.55	9th (out of 9) in heat 1; did not advance
Marcel Houssimoli	2012 London	Athletics	Men's 200 m T37	30.12	6th (out of 6) in heat 1; did not advance
Marcel Houssimoli	2012 London	Athletics	Men's 400 m T38	1:09.03	5th (out of 6) in heat 1; 7th (out of 8) in final
ken Kahu	2024 Paris	Athletics	Men's javelin F64	52.01 m	9th (out of 10) in heat 1; did not advance
Elie Enock	2024 Paris	Athletics	Women's shot put F57	7.27 m	11th (out of 13)

== See also ==
- Vanuatu at the Olympics
