= Abraham Kepsin =

Vanuatuan sprinter

Abraham Kepsin Kalpumu (born 10 February 1980) is a Vanuatuan sprinter.

Kepsin competed at the 2000 Summer Olympics held in Sydney, he entered the 100 metres and ran a personal best time of 11.12 seconds and finished 8th in his heat so didn't qualify for the next round.
