= Huang Lei (fighter) =

British Chinese foreign fighter

- Born: Sichuan Province, China
- Military career
- Allegiance: People's Protection Units
- Service years: 2015 – present
- Nicknames: Sîpan; LeiG7 (Online)
- Conflicts: Syrian Civil War: Operation Olive Branch

Huang Lei is a British Chinese foreign fighter who participated in the Syrian Civil War on behalf of the mainly Kurdish People's Protection Units, also known as YPG. Lei is originally from China; however he later moved to the United Kingdom for his education, and studied international politics at university, then eventually traveled to Syria to participate in the civil war in the country.

== Biography ==
Lei is reportedly 24 years old, and was born in the Sichuan Province in southern China and lived in Manchester in the United Kingdom. He traveled to Syria in March 2015 claiming it was his "duty" to fight against the Islamic State of Iraq and the Levant, he also claimed he is fighting in Syria to keep terrorism out of his country.

In late 2015, a foreign fighter from China claimed that he was inspired to join YPG by Lei and viewed him as inspirational. He also claimed that he fears that ISIL trained Chinese Muslims and sent them to China to carryout attacks, however later stated he regretted speaking to the media and feared ISIL would attack Chinese professionals in Iraq.

In 2018 after the start of Operation Euphrates Shield launched by Turkey and allied Syrian opposition forces organized under the Syrian National Army, he claimed to be one of 20 or 25 foreign fighters from YPG who arrived in Afrin to fight the Turkish military and allied rebel fighters, in an interview with BBC when asked if he was concerned that fighting Turkey, a member of NATO alongside the United Kingdom, could have legal consequences, to which he confirmed saying he was afraid of being arrested and that his intentions in Syria were to fight terrorists, and that he wishes to return to the United Kingdom. He told CNN regarding the Turkish-led operation that he views Turkey and ISIL as equally aggressive and would fight them both equally.
