= Nazario Fiakaifonu =

Vanuatuan judoka (born 1988)

Personal information
- Born: 27 March 1988 (age 37)
- Occupation: Judoka

Sport
- Sport: Judo

Profile at external databases
- IJF: 8652
- JudoInside.com: 79877

Nazario Fiakaifonu (born 27 March 1988 in Port Vila) is a Vanuatuan judoka who competed in the heavyweight division of Judo at the 2012 Summer Olympics.

Fiakaifonu was selected to compete in the men's +100 kg weight division of the 2012 Summer Olympics in London, United Kingdom. He was listed with height 1.89 m (6 ft 2 in) and weight 123 kilograms (271 lb). He lost to Marius Paškevičius of Lithuania in the first round (of 32).

Fiakaifonu competed in two championship matches prior to his appearance in the 2012 Summer Olympics—in August 2011 at the World Championships in Paris and in November 2011 at the Judo Oceania World Cup in Apia. Although he lost both matches in the first round, his appearances did earn him points on the rankings list of the International Judo Federation.

In 2014, he expected to compete in the over 100 kg weight division of the Commonwealth Games in Glasgow, Scotland, but did not do so.

His sister Amata Fiakaifonu is also a competitive judoka.
