= Vanuatu at the 2012 Summer Olympics =

- IOC code: VAN
- NOC: Vanuatu Association of Sports and National Olympic Committee
- Website: www.oceaniasport.com/vanuatu

in London
- Competitors: 5 in 3 sports
- Flag bearers: Anolyn Lulu (opening); Nazario Fiakaifonu (closing)
- Medals: Gold 0 Silver 0 Bronze 0 Total 0

Summer Olympics appearances (overview)
- 1988; 1992; 1996; 2000; 2004; 2008; 2012; 2016; 2020; 2024

Vanuatu competed at the 2012 Summer Olympics in London, from 27 July to 12 August 2012. This was the nation's seventh appearance at the Olympics.

The Vanuatu Association of Sports and National Olympic Committee (VASNOC) sent the nation's largest delegation to the Games since 1992. Five athletes, three men and two women, were selected to the team to compete in three different sports. Although Vanuatu's earlier Olympic appearances were primarily characterized by athletes competing in the track and field (except the 2000 Summer Olympics in Sydney, and the 2008 Summer Olympics in Beijing, where they included an archer and a table tennis player respectively), this nation made its Olympic debut in judo. Among the athletes competing at these games, table tennis player Anolyn Lulu, the oldest of the team at age 33, became Vanuatu's second female flag bearer at the opening ceremony.

Vanuatu has yet to win its first ever Olympic medal, as none of these athletes advanced past the first round of their respective sporting events.

== Athletics ==
Vanuatu qualified by one athlete for the Men's 800 metres and qualified one athlete for the Women's 100 metres under the universality criteria.

Men

Athlete	Event	Heat		Semifinal		Final	
Athlete	Event	Result	Rank	Result	Rank	Result	Rank
Arnold Sorina	800 m	1:54.29 SB	8	did not advance			

Women

Athlete	Event	Heat		Quarterfinal		Semifinal		Final	
Athlete	Event	Result	Rank	Result	Rank	Result	Rank	Result	Rank
Janice Alatoa	100 m	13.60	6	did not advance					

Key

- Note–Ranks given for track events are within the athlete's heat only
- Q = Qualified for the next round
- q = Qualified for the next round as a fastest loser or, in field events, by position without achieving the qualifying target
- NR = National record
- N/A = Round not applicable for the event
- Bye = Athlete not required to compete in round

== Judo ==
Vanuatu qualified 1 judoka in the men's heavyweight class through additional places for Oceania

Athlete	Event	Round of 32	Round of 16	Quarterfinals	Semifinals	Repechage	Final / BM	
Athlete	Event	Opposition Result	Opposition Result	Opposition Result	Opposition Result	Opposition Result	Opposition Result	Rank
Nazario Fiakaifonu	Men's +100 kg	Paškevičius (LTU); L 0000–0100	did not advance					

== Table tennis ==
Vanuatu qualified one player for the men's singles through the Oceania Qualification Tournament and qualified one player for the women's singles through the Oceania Qualification Tournament.

Athlete	Event	Preliminary round	Round 1	Round 2	Round 3	Round 4	Quarterfinals	Semifinals	Final / BM	
Athlete	Event	Opposition Result	Opposition Result	Opposition Result	Opposition Result	Opposition Result	Opposition Result	Opposition Result	Opposition Result	Rank
Yoshua Shing	Men's singles	Pereira (CUB); L 0–4	did not advance							
Anolyn Lulu	Women's singles	Silva (BRA); L 0–4	did not advance							
