= Li Xue =

French table tennis player

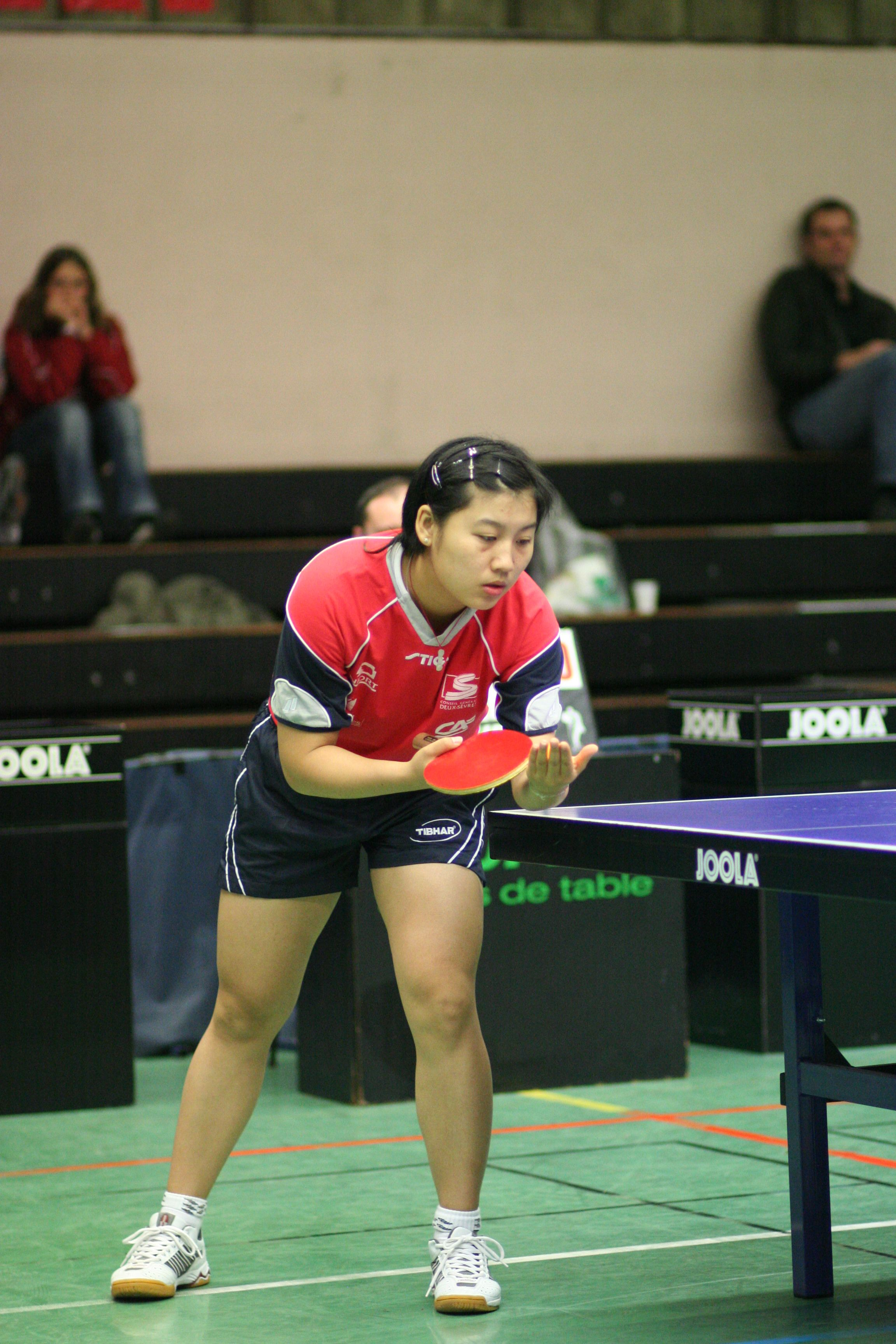
- Li in 2006

Personal information
- Born: 14 April 1985 (age 41) Boshan, China
- Height: 1.65 m (5 ft 5 in)
- Weight: 60 kg (132 lb)

Sport
- Sport: Table tennis
Medal record
Women's Table tennis
Representing France
European Championships
Bronze medal – third place	2012 Herning	Singles
Mediterranean Games
Silver medal – second place	2009 Pescara	Singles
Silver medal – second place	2009 Pescara	Team
Silver medal – second place	2013 Mersin	Team

Li Xue (Chinese: 李雪; pinyin: Lǐ Xuě, born 14 April 1985) is a Chinese-born French table tennis player. She has competed for France at the 2012 and 2016 Summer Olympics.
