= Ancel Nalau =

Vanuatuan middle-distance runner

Ancel Namrukwen Nalau (born 7 September 1968 in Tanna) is a Vanuatuan middle-distance runner.

Nalau competed in the 1992 Summer Olympics held in Barcelona, he entered the 1500 metres and finished his heat in last place so didn't qualify for the next round. In 2006 Nalau was the athletics team manager for Port Vila.
