= Vanuatu at the 2008 Summer Olympics =

- IOC code: VAN
- NOC: Vanuatu Association of Sports and National Olympic Committee
- Website: www.oceaniasport.com/vanuatu

in Beijing
- Competitors: 3 in 2 sports
- Flag bearer: Priscilla Tommy
- Medals: Gold 0 Silver 0 Bronze 0 Total 0

Summer Olympics appearances (overview)
- 1988; 1992; 1996; 2000; 2004; 2008; 2012; 2016; 2020; 2024; 2028

Vanuatu competed at the 2008 Summer Olympics in Beijing, China. A total of three Vanuatuan athletes competed in two sports. Moses Kamut and Elis Lapenmal competed in, respectively, the men's and women's 100m sprints, and Priscilla Tommy competed in women's singles table tennis after being selected by the IOC's Tripartite Commission. Tommy's appearance in particular was Vanuatu's debut into table tennis. Tommy was also the country's flagbearer during the opening ceremony. The Vanuatuan delegation to Beijing included the country's head of state and prime minister, but only included Elis Lapenmal; the other two athletes did not accompany the delegation and arrived in China at different times.

None of the three Vanuatuan Olympians progressed past the first round in their events, and thus did not earn any medals.

== Background ==
Vanuatu has participated in the Olympics since the 1988 Summer Olympics in Seoul, South Korea; its Olympic committee (VASANOC) was founded a year earlier. Vanuatu's appearance at the 2008 Olympics in Beijing, thus, marked its sixth appearance in the summer Olympics. Although Vanuatu's earlier Olympic appearances were primarily characterized by people participating in athletics (with the exception of the 2000 Summer Olympics, which included an archer), the 2008 Vanuatu team involved the country's debut in Olympic table tennis. Other Vanuatuans attempted Olympic qualification competitions in girl's beach volleyball, men's football, and taekwondo, but did not succeed.

Vanuatu's delegation left for Beijing on August 4; the delegation encompassed one of the three Olympians, as well as coaches Denison Tari, Sun Hongyi, and Anolyn Lulu; VASANOC president Joe Carlo; and VASANOC secretary general Seru Korikalo. Vanuatuan dignitaries, including the head of state, prime minister, and the minister of sports, also accompanied the team to attend the opening ceremony on August 8. Table tennis player Priscila Tommy and athlete Moses Kamut, the other two Vanuatuan qualifiers, did not accompany the Vanuatuan delegation to Beijing. Tommy arrived in China early for training, while Kamut spent time in Belgium.

Of the participating Olympians, table tennis player Priscila Tommy was the youngest, at age 17. Moses Kamut, at age 26, was the oldest. Kamut and Elis Lapenmal participated in athletics, and Tommy participated as the team's only table tennis player. There were no medalists from Vanuatu during these Olympic Games.

Priscila Tommy was Vanuatu's flag bearer in the opening ceremony.

== Athletics ==
Moses Kamut and Elis Lapenmal participated on behalf of Vanuatu in track and field, or athletics, events at the 2008 Beijing Olympics.

Kamut participated in the men's 100m sprint, and participated in the first round of the event on August 14. Kamut was placed in the first heat, and ran the event in 10.81 seconds. Within the first heat, Kamut placed 7th out of 8, beating Francis Manioru of the Solomon Islands by 0.28 seconds, but falling behind Jamaica's Usain Bolt by 0.61 seconds. Bolt ranked first in Kamut' heat. Overall, Moses Kamut ranked 61st out of 80 out of all the heats run on that day, and did not advance to the next round. Kamut received financial assistance through the Beijing Scholarship, which terminated after the Beijing Olympics ended.

Elis Lapenmal was Vanuatu's sole participant in the women's 100m dash. She took part in the first round of the event on August 15, in which she was placed in heat three versus athletes that included the United States' Muna Lee; Saint Kitts and Nevis' Virgil Hodge; and Mauritania's Bounkou Camara. Lapenmal ran the 100m in 13.31 seconds, placing eighth in a heat of nine people, just ahead of Camara, who scored 13.69 seconds. Muna Lee scored first in Lapenmal's heat with a time of 11.33 seconds. Overall, Lapenmal tied Guam's Cora Alicto for 76th place out of 85, and did not advance to the second round on August 16.

Men

Athlete	Event	Heat		Quarterfinal		Semifinal		Final	
Athlete	Event	Result	Rank	Result	Rank	Result	Rank	Result	Rank
Moses Kamut	100 m	10.81	7	Did not advance					

Women

Athlete	Event	Heat		Quarterfinal		Semifinal		Final	
Athlete	Event	Result	Rank	Result	Rank	Result	Rank	Result	Rank
Elis Lapenmal	100 m	13.31	8	Did not advance					

Key

- Note–Ranks given for track events are within the athlete's heat only
- Q = Qualified for the next round
- q = Qualified for the next round as a fastest loser or, in field events, by position without achieving the qualifying target
- NR = National record
- N/A = Round not applicable for the event
- Bye = Athlete not required to compete in round

== Table tennis ==
Priscilla Tommy won the Samsung Scholarship, which allowed her the financial backing she needed to participate in the Beijing games. Tommy was also selected by the Tripartite Commission on May 11, 2008, alongside Marcelo Aguirre of Paraguay. She was the only Vanuatuan participant in Olympian table tennis during the 2008 Summer Olympics. During the preliminary rounds on August 17, Priscilla Tommy was paired with Eva Ódorová of Slovakia, who she faced on the thirteenth of fourteen matches that took place that day. Tommy lost to Ódorová with a 4–0 record, and did not advance to the August 20 matches.

Athlete	Event	Preliminary round	Round 1	Round 2	Round 3	Round 4	Quarterfinals	Semifinals	Final / BM	
Athlete	Event	Opposition Result	Opposition Result	Opposition Result	Opposition Result	Opposition Result	Opposition Result	Opposition Result	Opposition Result	Rank
Priscilla Tommy	Women's singles	Ódorová (SVK); L 0–4	Did not advance							
