= Lei Huang Mendes =

Portuguese table tennis player

Lei Huang Mendes (Chinese: 黄蕾; pinyin: Huáng Léi, born 14 August 1982) is a Chinese-born Portuguese table tennis player. She competed for Portugal at the 2012 Summer Olympics.

== Personal life ==
She is married to a Portuguese from Madeira and her coach is Cláudio Mendes.
