= Table tennis at the 2012 Summer Olympics =

Coordinates: 51.5075°N 0.0297°E

Table tennis at the Games of the XXX Olympiad
- Venue: ExCeL London
- Dates: 28 July - 8 August 2012
- Competitors: 174 from 57 nations

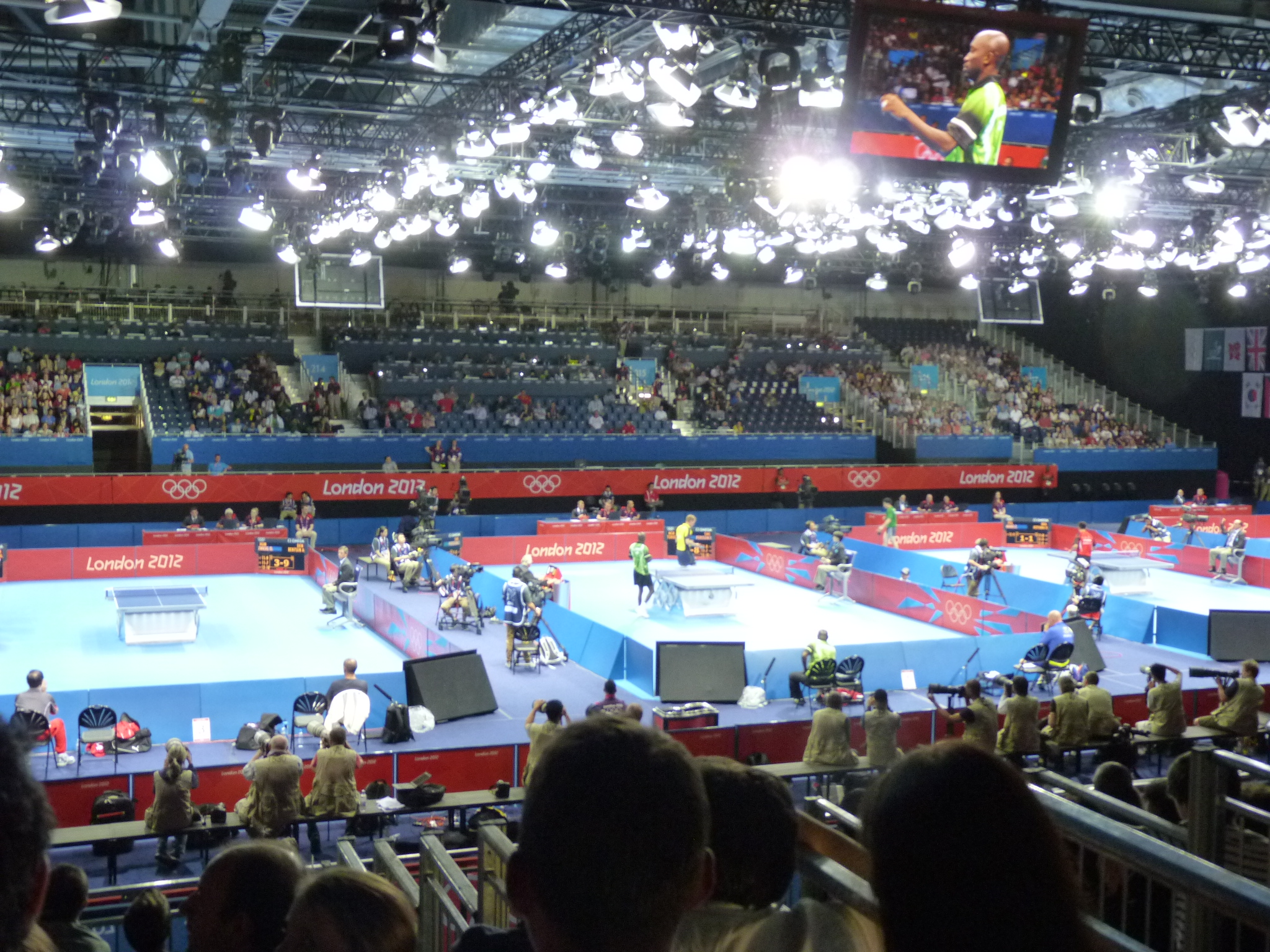
ExCeL London as the venue

Table tennis at the 2012 Summer Olympics in London took place from Saturday 28 July to Wednesday 8 August 2012 at ExCeL London. 174 athletes, 86 men and 88 women, competed in four events. Table tennis has appeared at the Summer Olympics on six previous occasions beginning with the 1988 Games in Seoul. In addition to men's and women's singles, the team events were staged for the second time since replacing doubles events at the 2008 Beijing Games. China was the defending champion in each of the Olympic events having won all 4 gold medals in 2008.

== Qualification ==
As hosts Great Britain qualified six athletes automatically; a team of three men, one of whom competed in the singles, and a team of three women, one of whom competed in the singles.

The top 28 male and top 28 female players on the International Table Tennis Federation's ranking list immediately after the 2011 World Table Tennis Championships, which finished on 15 May 2011 in the Netherlands, were qualified for the singles events at Games. No nation can have more than two players per gender in the singles events at the Games, so some players below 28th place were given a qualification berth based on their rankings.

Ten continental qualification tournaments then were used to assign a total of 40 places between 28 June 2011 and 22 April 2012. A final qualification tournament took place on 12 May 2012 to assign a further two places per gender. One invitational place per gender was allocated by the International Table Tennis Federation (ITTF).

Entries for the team events were decided after the final qualification tournament ended on 13 May 2012. The highest-ranked nation at the 2012 World Team Championships from each of the six continents earned the right to enter as long as three of its players had met the qualification criteria for the singles event. Except for the host British team, the qualification of the other 15 NOCs was based on the number of the qualified players and the ranking of the 2012 World Team Championships.

== Competition schedule ==
P	Preliminary rounds	¼	Quarterfinals	½	Semifinals	F	Final

Event↓/Date →	Sat 28	Sun 29	Mon 30	Tue 31		Wed 1	Thu 2		Fri 3	Sat 4	Sun 5	Mon 6	Tue 7	Wed 8
Men's singles	P			¼			½	F						
Men's team									P		¼	½		F
Women's singles	P			¼	½	F								
Women's team									P	¼	½		F	

== Participating nations ==
A total of 174 athletes (86 men and 88 women), representing 57 NOCs, competed in four events.

- Argentina (1)
- Australia (6)
- Austria (6)
- Belarus (3)
- Belgium (1)
- Brazil (6)
- Cameroon (1)
- Canada (4)
- Chile (1)
- China (6)
- Colombia (1)
- Republic of the Congo (3)
- Croatia (4)
- Cuba (1)
- Czech Republic (2)
- Denmark (3)
- Djibouti (1)
- Dominican Republic (1)
- Egypt (6)
- France (3)
- Germany (6)
- Great Britain (6)
- Greece (2)
- Hong Kong (6)
- Hungary (4)
- India (2)
- Iran (2)
- Italy (2)
- Japan (6)
- Kuwait (1)
- Latvia (1)
- Lebanon (1)
- Luxembourg (1)
- Mexico (1)
- Netherlands (3)
- Nigeria (4)
- North Korea (6)
- Paraguay (1)
- Poland (4)
- Portugal (4)
- Qatar (1)
- Romania (3)
- Russia (5)
- Serbia (2)
- Singapore (6)
- Slovenia (1)
- South Korea (7)
- Spain (5)
- Sweden (3)
- Chinese Taipei (3)
- Thailand (1)
- Togo (1)
- Turkey (2)
- Ukraine (4)
- United States (4)
- Vanuatu (2)
- Venezuela (1)

== Medal summary ==
=== Medal table ===
Rank	Nation	Gold	Silver	Bronze	Total
1	China	4	2	0	6
2	Japan	0	1	0	1
2	South Korea	0	1	0	1
4	Germany	0	0	2	2
4	Singapore	0	0	2	2
Totals (5 entries)		4	4	4	12

=== Events ===
All events at the Games took the form of a knockout competition.

Event	Gold	Silver	Bronze
Men's singles	Zhang Jike; China	Wang Hao; China	Dimitrij Ovtcharov; Germany
Men's team	China; Wang Hao; Zhang Jike; Ma Long	South Korea; Oh Sang-eun; Joo Se-hyuk; Ryu Seung-min	Germany; Timo Boll; Dimitrij Ovtcharov; Bastian Steger
Women's singles	Li Xiaoxia; China	Ding Ning; China	Feng Tianwei; Singapore
Women's team	China; Ding Ning; Li Xiaoxia; Guo Yue	Japan; Ai Fukuhara; Sayaka Hirano; Kasumi Ishikawa	Singapore; Li Jiawei; Feng Tianwei; Wang Yuegu

== See also ==
- Table tennis at the 2012 Summer Paralympics
