= Xian Yi Fang =

French-Chinese table tennis player

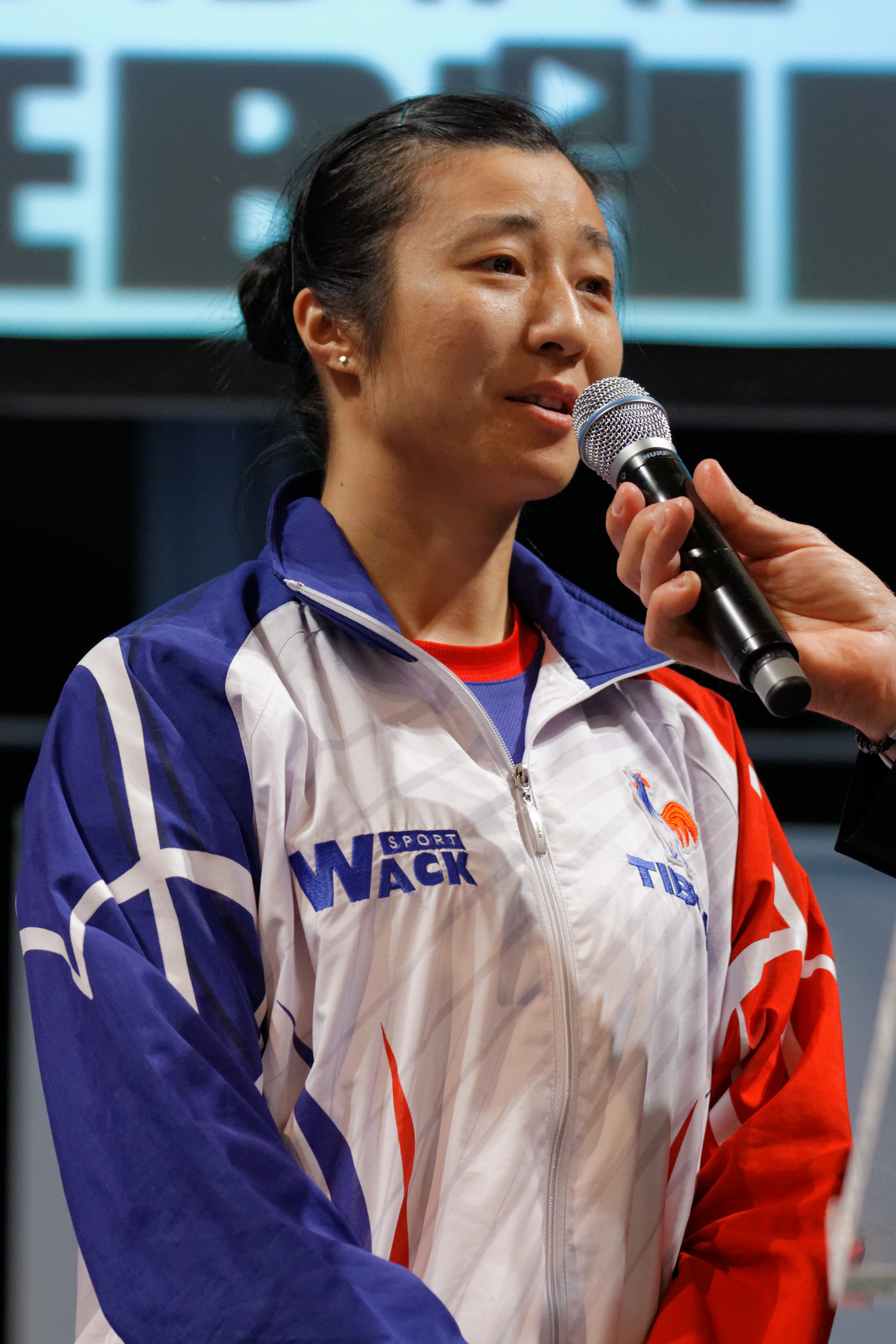
- Mondial Ping 2013

Medal record

Women's Table tennis

Representing France

European Championships
Silver medal – second place	2012 Herning	Singles

Mediterranean Games
Silver medal – second place	2013 Mersin	Team

Xian Yi Fang (born 20 August 1977) is a female Chinese-born table tennis player who has represented France since 2005.

She competed at the 2008 Summer Olympics, reaching the second round of the singles competition. She also competed at the 2012 Summer Olympics and reaching the third round of the singles competition.

She was born in Baoding.
