= Hugo Cumbo =

Vanuatuan judoka

Personal information
- Nationality: French, ni-Vanuatu
- Born: 11 May 1996 (age 28); Port-Vila, Vanuatu
- Occupation: Judoka

Sport
- Country: Vanuatu
- Sport: Judo
- Weight class: –81 kg

Achievements and titles
- Olympic Games: R32 (2020, 2024)
- World Champ.: R128 (2019)

Profile at external databases
- IJF: 14442
- JudoInside.com: 107777
- Updated on 30 July 2024

Hugo Cumbo (born 11 May 1996) is a judoka from Vanuatu. He competed at the 2020 Summer Olympics in the Men's 81 kg.

== Personal life ==
He graduated with a master's degree from Arts et Métiers and the University of Guadalajara in industrial engineering.
