= Vanuatu Association of Sports and National Olympic Committee =

National Olympic Committee

- Country: Vanuatu
- Code: VAN
- Recognized: 1987
- Continental Association: ONOC
- President: Antoine Boudier
- Secretary General: Cyrille Mainguy
- Website: afcnovasanoc.wixsite.com/vasanoc

The Vanuatu Association of Sports and National Olympic Committee (French: Association des sports et comité national olympique du Vanuatu; IOC code: VAN) is the National Olympic Committee representing Vanuatu.

== See also ==
- Vanuatu at the Olympics
- Vanuatu at the Commonwealth Games
