= Gymnastics at the 2014 Commonwealth Games – Women's rhythmic individual all-around =

Women's rhythmic individual all-around at the 2014 Commonwealth Games
- Venue: Scottish Exhibition and Conference Centre
- Dates: 24–25 July 2014
- Competitors: 32 from 12 nations
- Winning score: 59.175

Medalists
| gold medal | Patricia Bezzoubenko | Canada |
| silver medal | Francesca Jones | Wales |
| bronze medal | Laura Halford | Wales |

The women's rhythmic individual all-around gymnastics competition at the 2014 Commonwealth Games in Glasgow, Scotland was held from 24 July to 25 July at the Scottish Exhibition and Conference Centre.

The team competition on 24 July, was also used as the qualifying competition for the individual-all around. 32 athletes participated with the top 16 advancing to the final. However, only two athletes per nation were allowed to progress.

== Qualification ==
Results:

| Place | Name | Hoop (rhythmic gymnastics) | Ball (rhythmic gymnastics) | Clubs (rhythmic gymnastics) | Ribbon (rhythmic gymnastics) | Total | Notes |
|---|---|---|---|---|---|---|---|
| 1 | Patricia Bezzoubenko (CAN) | 15.750 | 14.500 | 15.575 | 13.750 | 59.575 | Q |
| 2 | Francesca Jones (WAL) | 14.000 | 14.450 | 15.150 | 13.675 | 57.275 | Q |
| 3 | Themida Christodoulidou (CYP) | 14.100 | 14.075 | 14.550 | 13.300 | 56.025 | Q |
| 4 | Pantelitsa Theodoulou (CYP) | 14.500 | 13.800 | 14.375 | 13.050 | 55.725 | Q |
| 5 | Laura Halford (WAL) | 14.500 | 14.200 | 13.500 | 13.400 | 55.600 | Q |
| 6 | Amy Kwan Dict Weng (MAS) | 14.400 | 13.625 | 13.750 | 13.750 | 55.525 | Q |
| 7 | Maria Kitkarska (CAN) | 13.500 | 13.675 | 14.475 | 13.700 | 55.350 | Q |
| 8 | Wong Poh San (MAS) | 14.550 | 12.250 | 14.475 | 13.925 | 55.200 | Q |
| 9 | Grace Legote (RSA) | 13.400 | 13.500 | 14.000 | 13.900 | 54.800 | Q |
| 10 | Danielle Prince (AUS) | 13.600 | 13.425 | 13.700 | 13.000 | 53.725 | Q |
| 11 | Stephani Sherlock (ENG) | 14.150 | 13.525 | 12.550 | 13.200 | 53.425 | Q |
| 12 | Lynne Hutchison (ENG) | 10.950 | 12.900 | 13.350 | 13.900 | 51.100 | Q |
| 13 | Annabelle Kovacs (CAN) | 13.900 | 12.325 | 11.850 | 12.625 | 50.700 | |
| 14 | Mimi-Isabella Cesar (ENG) | 12.850 | 13.225 | 11.300 | 12.450 | 49.825 | |
| 15 | Jaelle Cohen (AUS) | 12.075 | 12.250 | 12.150 | 12.200 | 48.675 | Q |
| 16 | Fatin Zakirah Zain Jalany (MAS) | 12.300 | 11.300 | 12.800 | 11.675 | 48.075 | |
| 17 | Aimee van Rooyen (RSA) | 10.875 | 11.850 | 12.100 | 12.200 | 47.025 | Q |
| 18 | Lauren Brash (SCO) | 11.300 | 11.200 | 12.450 | 11.800 | 46.750 | Q |
| 19 | Kah Mun Tong (SIN) | 11.225 | 12.100 | 11.600 | 11.725 | 46.650 | Q |
| 20 | Nikara Jenkins (WAL) | 11.200 | 11.550 | 11.900 | 11.850 | 46.500 | |
| 21 | Amy Quinn (AUS) | 11.050 | 12.725 | 10.600 | 11.600 | 45.975 | |
| 22 | Julene van Rooyen (RSA) | 11.550 | 10.750 | 11.550 | 11.800 | 45.650 | |
| 23 | Amelia Coleman (NZL) | 11.100 | 10.650 | 11.900 | 11.400 | 45.050 | R1 |
| 24 | Daphne Chia (SIN) | 11.375 | 8.550 | 11.400 | 11.350 | 42.675 | R2 |
| 25 | Becky Bee (SCO) | 11.325 | 9.100 | 11.025 | 9.400 | 40.850 | |
| 26 | Kelly MacDonald (NZL) | 11.700 | 10.275 | 9.600 | 9.125 | 40.700 | |
| 27 | Victoria Clow (SCO) | 10.475 | 9.375 | 10.350 | 10.300 | 40.500 | |
| 28 | Yi Lin Phaan (SIN) | 9.050 | 9.150 | 9.850 | 9.050 | 37.100 | |
| 29 | Gemma Lightbourne (BER) | 8.825 | 8.225 | 8.725 | 7.550 | 33.325 | |
| 30 | Prabhjot Bajwa (IND) | 8.300 | 8.075 | 8.950 | 7.600 | 32.925 | |
| 31 | Mitali (IND) | 6.950 | 6.500 | 7.700 | 5.600 | 26.750 | |
| 32 | Palak Bijral (IND) | 5.600 | 6.625 | 6.650 | 5.700 | 24.575 | |

R1 = 1st reserve for final
R2 = 2nd reserve for final

== Final ==
Results:

| Rank | Gymnast | Hoop (rhythmic gymnastics) | Ball (rhythmic gymnastics) | Clubs (rhythmic gymnastics) | Ribbon (rhythmic gymnastics) | Total |
|---|---|---|---|---|---|---|
| 1st place, gold medalist(s) | Patricia Bezzoubenko (CAN) | 14.175 | 15.200 | 15.000 | 14.800 | 59.175 |
| 2nd place, silver medalist(s) | Francesca Jones (WAL) | 14.250 | 14.200 | 14.700 | 14.200 | 57.350 |
| 3rd place, bronze medalist(s) | Laura Halford (WAL) | 14.500 | 13.975 | 14.500 | 13.250 | 56.225 |
| 4 | Wong Poh San (MAS) | 14.250 | 14.025 | 13.400 | 14.200 | 55.875 |
| 5 | Pantelitsa Theodoulou (CYP) | 14.250 | 13.725 | 14.300 | 12.825 | 55.100 |
| 6 | Amy Kwan Dict Weng (MAS) | 14.050 | 14.050 | 12.700 | 12.675 | 53.475 |
| 7 | Themida Christodoulidou (CYP) | 13.325 | 14.050 | 13.075 | 12.775 | 53.225 |
| 8 | Maria Kitkarska (CAN) | 13.200 | 13.000 | 13.500 | 13.350 | 53.050 |
| 9 | Danielle Prince (AUS) | 12.500 | 12.900 | 13.325 | 13.000 | 51.725 |
| 10 | Grace Legote (RSA) | 13.700 | 13.100 | 10.750 | 13.850 | 51.400 |
| 11 | Stephani Sherlock (ENG) | 13.550 | 13.025 | 12.050 | 12.550 | 51.175 |
| 12 | Lynne Hutchison (ENG) | 12.900 | 11.950 | 13.275 | 12.900 | 51.025 |
| 13 | Kah Mun Tong (SIN) | 11.850 | 11.750 | 11.800 | 12.700 | 48.100 |
| 14 | Jaelle Cohen (AUS) | 12.050 | 11.600 | 11.850 | 11.550 | 47.050 |
| 15 | Aimee van Rooyen (RSA) | 11.450 | 11.750 | 12.000 | 10.625 | 45.825 |
| 16 | Lauren Brash (SCO) | 10.800 | 11.350 | 11.400 | 11.325 | 44.875 |
