= Gymnastics at the 2014 Commonwealth Games – Women's rhythmic individual clubs =

Women's rhythmic individual clubs at the 2014 Commonwealth Games
- Venue: Scottish Exhibition and Conference Centre
- Dates: 26 July
- Competitors: 8 from 5 nations
- Winning score: 15.350

Medalists
| gold medal | Patricia Bezzoubenko | Canada |
| silver medal | Francesca Jones | Wales |
| bronze medal | Themida Christodoulidou | Cyprus |

The women's rhythmic individual clubs gymnastics competition at the 2014 Commonwealth Games in Glasgow, Scotland was held on 26 July at the Scottish Exhibition and Conference Centre.

== Final ==
Results:

| Place | Name | Clubs (rhythmic gymnastics) |
|---|---|---|
| 1st place, gold medalist(s) | Patricia Bezzoubenko (CAN) | 15.350 |
| 2nd place, silver medalist(s) | Francesca Jones (WAL) | 14.800 |
| 3rd place, bronze medalist(s) | Themida Christodoulidou (CYP) | 14.300 |
| 4 | Pantelitsa Theodoulou (CYP) | 14.150 |
| 5 | Grace Legote (RSA) | 14.050 |
| 6 | Maria Kitkarska (CAN) | 14.000 |
| 7 | Amy Dict Weng Kwan (MAS) | 13.900 |
| 8 | Wong Poh San (MAS) | 13.375 |
