= Gymnastics at the 2014 Commonwealth Games – Women's rhythmic individual ball =

Women's rhythmic individual ball at the 2014 Commonwealth Games
- Venue: Scottish Exhibition and Conference Centre
- Dates: 26 July
- Competitors: 8 from 5 nations
- Winning score: 15.250

Medalists
gold medal	Patricia Bezzoubenko	Canada
silver medal	Francesca Jones	Wales
bronze medal	Laura Halford	Wales

The women's rhythmic individual ball gymnastics competition at the 2014 Commonwealth Games in Glasgow, Scotland was held on 26 July at the Scottish Exhibition and Conference Centre.

== Final ==
Results:

Place	Name	Ball (rhythmic gymnastics)
1st place, gold medalist(s)	Patricia Bezzoubenko (CAN)	15.250
2nd place, silver medalist(s)	Francesca Jones (WAL)	14.875
3rd place, bronze medalist(s)	Laura Halford (WAL)	14.550
4	Themida Christodoulidou (CYP)	14.050
5	Amy Dict Weng Kwan (MAS)	13.650
6	Pantelitsa Theodoulou (CYP)	13.600
7	Stephani Sherlock (ENG)	12.950
8	Maria Kitkarska (CAN)	12.800
