= Gymnastics at the 2014 Commonwealth Games =

- Venue: The SSE Hydro
- Location: Glasgow, Scotland
- Dates: 24 July – 1 August 2014
- Competitors: 162 from 22 nations

Gymnastics at the 2014 Commonwealth Games was the eighth appearance of Gymnastics at the Commonwealth Games. The gymnastics competition were held in Glasgow, Scotland, from 24 July to 1 August at the SSE Hydro arena at the Scottish Exhibition and Conference Centre.

== Medal table ==
* Host nation (Scotland)

Rank	Nation	Gold	Silver	Bronze	Total
1	England	9	5	5	19
2	Canada	8	3	4	15
3	Scotland*	2	2	1	5
4	Wales	1	5	4	10
5	Australia	0	4	0	4
6	Malaysia	0	1	2	3
7	Cyprus	0	0	1	1
7	India	0	0	1	1
7	New Zealand	0	0	1	1
7	Singapore	0	0	1	1
Totals (10 entries)		20	20	20	60

== Medal summary ==
=== Artistic ===
Men's Events

Event	Gold	Silver	Bronze
Team all-around	England; Sam Oldham; Louis Smith; Kristian Thomas; Max Whitlock; Nile Wilson	Scotland; Frank Baines; Adam Cox; Liam Davie; Daniel Keatings; Daniel Purvis	Canada; Zachary Clay; Nathan Gafuik; Anderson Loran; Kevin Lytwyn; Scott Morgan
Individual all-around	Max Whitlock; England	Daniel Keatings; Scotland	Nile Wilson; England
Floor exercise	Max Whitlock; England	Scott Morgan; Canada	David Bishop; New Zealand
Horizontal bar	Nile Wilson; England	Kristian Thomas; England	Kevin Lytwyn; Canada
Parallel bars	Daniel Purvis; Scotland	Nile Wilson; England	Max Whitlock; England
Pommel horse	Daniel Keatings; Scotland	Max Whitlock; England	Louis Smith; England
Rings	Scott Morgan; Canada	Kevin Lytwyn; Canada	Daniel Purvis; Scotland
Vault	Scott Morgan; Canada	Kristian Thomas; England	Hoe Wah Toon; Singapore

Women's Events

Event	Gold	Silver	Bronze
Team all-around	England; Ruby Harrold; Kelly Simm; Hannah Whelan; Claudia Fragapane; Rebecca Downie	Australia; Georgia Rose Brown; Larrissa Miller; Lauren Mitchell; Mary Anne Monckton; Olivia Vivian	Wales; Elizabeth Beddoe; Georgina Hockenhull; Jessica Hogg; Angel Romaeo; Raer Theaker
Individual all-around	Claudia Fragapane; England	Ruby Harrold; England	Hannah Whelan; England
Vault	Claudia Fragapane; England	Elsabeth Black; Canada	Dipa Karmakar; India
Uneven bars	Rebecca Downie; England	Larrissa Miller; Australia	Ruby Harrold; England
Balance beam	Elsabeth Black; Canada	Mary Anne Monckton; Australia	Georgina Hockenhull; Wales
Floor	Claudia Fragapane; England	Lauren Mitchell; Australia	Elsabeth Black; Canada

=== Rhythmic ===
Event	Gold	Silver	Bronze
Team all-around	Canada; Annabelle Kovacs; Maria Kitkarska; Patricia Bezzoubenko	Wales; Nikara Jenkins; Francesca Jones; Laura Halford	Malaysia; Fatin Zakirah Zain Jalany; Wong Poh San; Amy Kwan Dict Weng
Individual all-around	Patricia Bezzoubenko; Canada	Francesca Jones; Wales	Laura Halford; Wales
Ball	Patricia Bezzoubenko; Canada	Francesca Jones; Wales	Laura Halford; Wales
Clubs	Patricia Bezzoubenko; Canada	Francesca Jones; Wales	Themida Christodoulidou; Cyprus
Hoop	Patricia Bezzoubenko; Canada	Francesca Jones; Wales	Wong Poh San; Malaysia
Ribbon	Francesca Jones; Wales	Wong Poh San; Malaysia	Patricia Bezzoubenko; Canada

== Participating nations ==
=== Artistic ===
The following nations participated in Artistic Gymnastics at the 2014 Commonwealth Games

- Australia (10)
- Bangladesh (1)
- Canada (10)
- Cayman Islands (1)
- Cyprus (6)
- England (10)
- India (10)
- Isle of Man (8)
- Jamaica (1)
- Jersey (1)
- Malaysia (7)
- Malta (3)
- New Zealand (10)
- Northern Ireland (6)
- Pakistan (1)
- Scotland (10)
- Singapore (10)
- South Africa (7)
- Sri Lanka (5)
- Trinidad and Tobago (3)
- Wales (10)

=== Rhythmic ===
The following nations participated in Rhythmic Gymnastics at the 2014 Commonwealth Games

- Australia (3)
- Canada (3)
- Bermuda (1)
- Cyprus (2)
- England (3)
- India (3)
- Malaysia (3)
- New Zealand (2)
- Scotland (3)
- Singapore (3)
- South Africa (3)
- Wales (3)

== See also ==
- Gymnastics at the 2014 Summer Youth Olympics
