= Malaysia at the 2014 Commonwealth Games =

- CGF code: MAS
- CGA: Olympic Council of Malaysia
- Website: olympic.org.my

in Glasgow, Scotland
- Competitors: 180 in 15 sports
- Flag bearer: Fatehah Mustapa
- Medals Ranked 12th: Gold 6 Silver 7 Bronze 6 Total 19

Commonwealth Games appearances (overview)
- 1950; 1954; 1958; 1962; 1966; 1970; 1974; 1978; 1982; 1986; 1990; 1994; 1998; 2002; 2006; 2010; 2014; 2018; 2022; 2026; 2030

Other related appearances
- British North Borneo (1958, 1962); Sarawak (1958, 1962)

Malaysia competed in the 2014 Commonwealth Games in Glasgow, Scotland, from 23 July to 3 August 2014.

== Media coverage ==
Malaysian satellite television provider Astro, public broadcaster Radio Televisyen Malaysia and Media Prima Group private broadcasters TV3 (Sistem Televisyen Malaysia Berhad) and NTV7 (Natseven TV Sdn Bhd) held the broadcast rights of the 2014 Commonwealth Games in the country. This was the only time in 2010's decade Malaysian sports telecast when Radio Televisyen Malaysia (RTM) and Media Prima compete against each other for free-to-air broadcast rights for the event. Radio Televisyen Malaysia would later regain full rights for the 2018 edition as it did in 2010.

== Medallists ==
Medal	Name	Sport	Event	Date
Gold	Mohd Hafifi Mansor	Weightlifting	Men's 69 kg	26 July
Gold	Nicol David	Squash	Women's singles	28 July
Gold	Chan Peng Soon; Chong Wei Feng; Daren Liew; Goh V Shem; Lai Pei Jing; Lim Yin Loo; Tan Wee Kiong; Tee Jing Yi; Vivian Hoo Kah Mun; Woon Khe Wei	Badminton	Mixed team	28 July
Gold	Ooi Tze Liang	Diving	Men's 3 m springboard	31 July
Gold	Vivian Hoo Kah Mun; Woon Khe Wei	Badminton	Women's doubles	3 August
Gold	Goh V Shem; Tan Wee Kiong	Badminton	Men's doubles	3 August
Silver	Zulhelmi Md Pisol	Weightlifting	Men's 56 kg	24 July
Silver	Wong Poh San	Gymnastics	Women's rhythmic individual ribbon	26 July
Silver	Emma Firyana Saroji; Nur Fidrah Noh; Nor Hashimah Ismail; Azlina Arshad	Lawn bowls	Women's fours	27 July
Silver	Beh Lee Wei; Ho Ying; Lee Rou You; Ng Sock Khim	Table tennis	Women's team	27 July
Silver	Muhammad Hizlee Abdul Rais; Fairul Izwan Abdul Muin	Lawn bowls	Men's pairs	28 July
Silver	Pandelela Rinong	Diving	Women's 10 m platform	31 July
Silver	Ooi Tze Liang	Diving	Men's 10 m platform	2 August
Bronze	Amy Kwan Dict Weng; Wong Poh San; Fatin Zakirah Zain Jalany	Gymnastics	Women's rhythmic team all-around	24 July
Bronze	Nur Suryani Mohamed Taibi	Shooting	Women's 10 m air rifle	25 July
Bronze	Wong Poh San	Gymnastics	Women's rhythmic individual hoop	26 July
Bronze	Azizulhasni Awang	Cycling	Men's keirin	27 July
Bronze	Pandelela Rinong; Nur Dhabitah Sabri	Diving	Women's 10 m synchronised platform	30 July
Bronze	Jong Yee Khie	Weightlifting	Men's powerlifting +72 kg	2 August

Medals by sport
Sport	1st place, gold medalist(s)	2nd place, silver medalist(s)	3rd place, bronze medalist(s)	Total	Rank
Badminton	3	0	0	3	1
Diving	1	2	1	4	4
Weightlifting	1	1	1	3	6
Squash	1	0	0	1	3
Lawn bowls	0	2	0	2	5
Gymnastics	0	1	2	3	6
Table tennis	0	1	0	1	4
Cycling	0	0	1	1	8
Shooting	0	0	1	1	12
Athletics	0	0	0	0	0
Boxing	0	0	0	0	0
Hockey	0	0	0	0	0
Judo	0	0	0	0	0
Rugby sevens	0	0	0	0	0
Swimming	0	0	0	0	0
Netball	did not participate				
Triathlon	did not participate				
Wrestling	did not participate				
Total	6	7	6	19	12

Medals by day
Date	1st place, gold medalist(s)	2nd place, silver medalist(s)	3rd place, bronze medalist(s)	Total
24 July	0	1	1	2
25 July	0	0	1	1
26 July	1	1	1	3
27 July	0	2	1	3
28 July	2	1	0	3
29 July	0	0	0	0
30 July	0	0	1	1
31 July	1	1	0	2
1 August	0	0	0	0
2 August	0	1	1	2
3 August	2	0	0	2
Total	6	7	6	19

== Athletics ==
Key

- Note – Ranks given for track events are within the athlete's heat only
- Q = Qualified for the next round
- q = Qualified for the next round as a fastest loser or, in field events, by position without achieving the qualifying target
- NR = National record
- N/A = Round not applicable for the event
- Bye = Athlete not required to compete in round

Men
Field events

Athlete	Event	Qualification		Final	
Athlete	Event	Distance	Position	Distance	Position
Nauraj Singh Randhawa	High jump	2.06	19	Did not advance	
Iskandar Alwi	Pole vault	—N/a		5.00	9
Jackie Wong Siew Cheer	Hammer throw	59.24	18	Did not advance	

Women
Track event

Athlete	Event	Heat		Semifinal		Final	
Athlete	Event	Result	Rank	Result	Rank	Result	Rank
Raja Nursheena Raja Azhar	100 m hurdles	14.30	19	—N/a		Did not advance	

Field event

Athlete	Event	Qualification		Final	
Athlete	Event	Distance	Position	Distance	Position
Yap Sean Yee	High jump	1.71	23	Did not advance	

== Badminton ==
Individual

Athlete	Event	Round of 64	Round of 32	Round of 16	Quarterfinals	Semifinals	Final	Rank
Athlete	Event	Opposition Score	Opposition Score	Opposition Score	Opposition Score	Opposition Score	Opposition Score	Rank
Chong Wei Feng (1)	Men's singles	Bye	B Goonathileka (SRI); W 2–0	T Stephenson (NIR); W 2–0	R M V Gurusaidutt (IND); L 1–2	Did not advance		
Liew Daren (7)	Men's singles	L Yon (SHN); W 2–0	D Sam (GHA); W 2–0	D Karunaratna (SRI); W 2–0	K Parupalli (IND); L 0–2	Did not advance		
Tee Jing Yi (5)	Women's singles	Bye	E de Villiers (RSA); W 2–0	N Gayanthi (SRI); W 2–0	P. C. Thulasi (IND); W 2–1	K Gilmour (SCO); L 0–2	Bronze medal match P V Sindhu (IND); L 0–2	4

Doubles

Athlete	Event	Round of 64	Round of 32	Round of 16	Quarterfinals	Semifinals	Final	Rank
Athlete	Event	Opposition Score	Opposition Score	Opposition Score	Opposition Score	Opposition Score	Opposition Score	Rank
Tan Wee Kiong; Goh V Shem	Men's doubles	M Constable & A Hutchings (JER); W 2–0	A D'Souza & T Ng (CAN); W 2–0	P Chopra & A Dewalkar (IND); W 2–0	R Middleton & R Smith (AUS); W 2–0	C Adcock & A Ellis (ENG); W 2–0	Gold medal match D B Chrisnanta & C Triyachart (SIN); W 2–1	1st place, gold medalist(s)
Chan Peng Soon; Liew Daren	Men's doubles	Bye	R Cribb & M Donohoe (NFI); W 2–0	C Langridge & P Mills (ENG); L 0–2	Did not advance			
Woon Khe Wei; Vivian Hoo (2)	Women's doubles	—N/a	Bye	J Ah-Wan & A Camille (SEY); W 2–0	J Fry & S le Grange (RSA); W 2–0	G Adcock & L Smith (ENG); W 2–0	Gold medal match J Gutta & A Ponnappa (IND); W 2–0	1st place, gold medalist(s)
Lim Yin Loo; Lai Pei Jing	Women's doubles	—N/a	E Johnson & G Lloyd (GUE); W 2–0	H Olver & K Robertshaw (ENG); W 2–0	S M Sari & Yao L (SIN); W 2–1	J Gutta & A Ponnappa (IND); L 0–2	Bronze medal match G Adcock & L Smith (ENG); L 1–2	4
Chan Peng Soon; Lai Pei Jing (5)	Mixed doubles	Bye	O Leydon-Davis & S Leydon-Davis (NZL); W 2–1	B Goonathileka & M Beruwalage (SRI); W 2–0	D B Chrisnanta & V Neo (SIN); W 2–1	C Langridge & H Olver (ENG); L 1–2	Bronze medal match R Blair & I Bankier (SCO); L 0–2	4
Tan Wee Kiong; Vivian Hoo	Mixed doubles	Bye	D Thorpe & M Eastmond (BAR); W 2–0	C Adcock & G Adcock (ENG); L 0–2	Did not advance			
Goh V Shem; Lim Yin Loo	Mixed doubles	E Johnson & D Penney (GUE); W 2–0	R Blair & I Bankier (SCO); L 1–2	Did not advance				

Mixed team

Pool A

Pos	Team	Pld	W	L	GF	GA	GD	PF	PA	PD	Pts	Qualification
1	Malaysia	2	2	0	20	0	+20	420	202	+218	2	Quarterfinals
2	Sri Lanka	2	1	1	10	10	0	342	292	+50	1	Quarterfinals
3	Barbados	2	0	2	0	20	−20	152	420	−268	0	

Source: glasgow2014.com

Malaysia
5
Commonwealth Arena, Glasgow
24 July

Barbados
0

			1	2	3
1	(Malaysia) (Barbados)	Chan Peng Soon / Lai Pei Jing; Andre Padmore / Shari Watson	21; 11	21; 6
2	(Malaysia) (Barbados)	Chong Wei Feng; Dakeil Thorpe	21; 6	21; 7
3	(Malaysia) (Barbados)	Tee Jing Yi; Mariama Eastmond	21; 8	21; 3
4	(Malaysia) (Barbados)	Tan Wee Kiong / Goh V Shem; Dakeil Thorpe / Andre Padmore	21; 6	21; 8
5	(Malaysia) (Barbados)	Woon Khe Wei / Vivian Hoo; Mariama Eastmond / Shari Watson	21; 8	21; 7

Malaysia
5
Commonwealth Arena, Glasgow
26 July

Sri Lanka
0

			1	2	3
1	(Malaysia) (Sri Lanka)	Liew Daren; Niluka Karunaratne	21; 17	21; 12
2	(Malaysia) (Sri Lanka)	Tee Jing Yi; Thilini Hendahewa	21; 14	21; 6
3	(Malaysia) (Sri Lanka)	Tan Wee Kiong / Goh V Shem; Niluka Karunaratne / Dinuka Karunaratna	21; 17	21; 19
4	(Malaysia) (Sri Lanka)	Lim Yin Loo / Vivian Hoon; Achini Rathnasiri / Upuli Weerasinghe	21; 11	21; 8
5	(Malaysia) (Sri Lanka)	Chan Peng Soon / Lai Pei Jing; Dinuka Karunaratna / Thilini Hendahewa	21; 14	21; 14

Quarterfinals

Malaysia
3
Commonwealth Arena, Glasgow
26 July

Scotland
1

			1	2	3
1	(Malaysia) (Scotland)	Chan Peng Soon / Lai Pei Jing; Robert Blair / Imogen Bankier	24; 22	9; 21	11; 21
2	(Malaysia) (Scotland)	Chong Wei Feng; Kieran Merrilees	21; 16	21; 14
3	(Malaysia) (Scotland)	Tee Jing Yi; Kirsty Gilmour	21; 10	21; 15
4	(Malaysia) (Scotland)	Tan Wee Kiong / Goh V Shem; Martin Campbell / Patrick MacHugh	21; 12	21; 15

Semifinals

Malaysia
3
Commonwealth Arena, Glasgow
27 July

Singapore
2

			1	2	3
1	(Malaysia) (Singapore)	Goh V Shem / Tan Wee Kiong; Chayut Triyachart / Danny Bawa Chrisnanta	21; 17	18; 21	21; 16
2	(Malaysia) (Singapore)	Chong Wei Feng; Derek Wong	21; 9	21; 18
3	(Malaysia) (Singapore)	Tee Jing Yi; Liang Xiaoyu	12; 21	20; 22
4	(Malaysia) (Singapore)	Vivian Hoo / Woon Khe Wei; Yao Lei / Shinta Mulia Sari	9; 21	18; 21
5	(Malaysia) (Singapore)	Chan Peng Soon / Lai Pei Jing; Danny Bawa Chrisnanta / Vanessa Neo	17; 21	21; 12	21; 14

Final

Malaysia
3
Commonwealth Arena, Glasgow
28 July

England
1

			1	2	3
1	(Malaysia) (England)	Chan Peng Soon / Lai Pei Jing; Chris Adcock / Gabby Adcock	14; 21	26; 28
2	(Malaysia) (England)	Chong Wei Feng; Rajiv Ouseph	21; 17	19; 21	21; 19
3	(Malaysia) (England)	Goh V Shem / Tan Wee Kiong; Chris Adcock / Andrew Ellis	21; 19	21; 17
4	(Malaysia) (England)	Tee Jing Yi; Sarah Walker	21; 16	21; 17

== Boxing ==
Men

Athlete	Event	Round of 32	Round of 16	Quarterfinals	Semifinals	Final	
Athlete	Event	Opposition Result	Opposition Result	Opposition Result	Opposition Result	Opposition Result	Rank
Muhamad Fuad Mohd Ridzuan	Light flyweight	I Suntele (LES); W 3–0	Mohibullah (PAK); W 3–0	A Williams (WAL); L 0–3	Did not advance		
Jaya Raman Selvakumar	Flyweight	Bye	M Waseem (PAK); L 0–3	Did not advance			
Muhammad Alnazirul Othman	Lightweight	N Cooney (AUS); L 0–3	Did not advance				
Khir Akyazlan Azmi	Light welterweight	N Eko (PNG); W 3–0	P Parris (CYP); W 3–0	S Duffy (NIR); L 0–3	Did not advance		
Muhammad Meeraj Omar	Heavyweight	—N/a	D Light (NZL); L KO	Did not advance			

== Cycling ==
=== Road ===
Athlete	Event	Time	Rank
Loh Sea Keong	Men's road race	DNF	
Muhammad Fauzan Ahmad Lutfi	Men's road race	DNF	
Muhammad Fauzan Ahmad Lutfi	Men's road time trial	54:55.64	20

=== Track ===
Sprint

Athlete	Event	Qualification		Round 1	Repechage 1	Quarterfinals	Semifinals	Final	
Athlete	Event	Time Speed (km/h)	Rank	Opposition Time Speed (km/h)	Opposition Time Speed (km/h)	Opposition Time	Opposition Time	Opposition Time	Rank
Azizulhasni Awang	Men's sprint	10.158; 70.880	7 Q	P Hindes (ENG); W 10.382; 69.350	Bye	S Webster (NZL); L, L	Bye	5th – 8th classification M Glaetzer (AUS); M Archibald (NZL); M Crampton (ENG); L	7
Muhammad Edrus Md Yunos	Men's sprint	10.257; 70.195	13	Did not advance					
Mohd Rizal Tisin	Men's sprint	10.575; 68.085	20	Did not advance					
Fatehah Mustapa	Women's sprint	11.433; 62.975	5 Q	—N/a		S McKenzie (NZL); W 12.139, W 12.184	S Morton (AUS); L, L	Bronze medal match J Varnish (ENG); L, L	4
Azizulhasni Awang; Josiah Ng; Muhammad Edrus Md Yunos	Men's team sprint	45.625	6	—N/a				Did not advance	

Time trial

Athlete	Event	Time Speed (km/h)	Rank
Josiah Ng	Men's 1 km time trial	1:04.309; 55.979	11
Mohd Rizal Tisin	Men's 1 km time trial	1:04.747; 55.601	12
Fatehah Mustapa	Women's 500 m time trial	34.667; 51.922	5

Points race

Athlete	Event	Qualification		Final	
Athlete	Event	Points	Rank	Points	Rank
Jupha Somnet	Women's points race	—N/a		2	12

Scratch race

Athlete	Event	Qualification		Final	
Athlete	Event	Time	Rank	Time	Rank
Fatehah Mustapa	Women's scratch race	—N/a		DNS	
Jupha Somnet	Women's scratch race	—N/a		—	6

Keirin

Athlete	Event	Round 1		Repechage 1		Semifinals		Final	
Athlete	Event	Opposition Time	Rank	Opposition Time	Rank	Opposition Time	Rank	Opposition Time	Rank
Azizulhasni Awang	Men's keirin	M Glaetzer (AUS); L Oliva (WAL); C Skinner (SCO); K Emadi (ENG); A Baby (IND); N Philip (TRI); L	2 Q	Bye		P Lewis (AUS); S Perkins (AUS); C Pritchard (SCO); J Ng O L (MAS); J Paul (SCO); W 10.674	1 Q	1st – 6th classification M Glaetzer (AUS); S Webster (NZL); S Perkins (AUS); P Lewis (AUS); E Dawkins (NZL); L	3rd place, bronze medalist(s)
Josiah Ng	Men's keirin	C Pritchard (SCO); E Dawkins (NZL); S Perkins (AUS); V De Haître (CAN); Q Alexander (TRI); J Mounter (BAR); L	3 R	J Veloce (CAN); V De Haître (CAN); N Philip (TRI); A Singh (IND); W 10.587	1 Q	A Awang (MAS); P Lewis (AUS); S Perkins (AUS); C Pritchard (SCO); J Paul (SCO); L	5 R	7th – 12th classification H Barrette (CAN); B Esterhuizen (RSA); C Pritchard (SCO); M Crampton (ENG); J Paul (SCO); L	12
Muhammad Edrus Md Yunos	Men's keirin	S Webster (NZL); J Paul (SCO); M Crampton (ENG); H Barrette (CAN); A Singh (IND); J Amoako-Ackah (GHA); L	5 R	S Perkins (AUS); S van Velthooven (NZL); A Baby (IND); L	2	Did not advance			

== Diving ==
Men

Athlete	Event	Preliminaries		Final	
Athlete	Event	Points	Rank	Points	Rank
Ahmad Amsyar Azman	1 m springboard	294.45	14	Did not advance	
Ooi Tze Liang	1 m springboard	333.80	7 Q	387.80	6
Ahmad Amsyar Azman	3 m springboard	368.75	10 Q	412.65	5
Chew Yi Wei	3 m springboard	364.65	11 Q	368.50	10
Ooi Tze Liang	3 m springboard	416.15	2 Q	457.60	1st place, gold medalist(s)
Chew Yi Wei	10 m platform	367.15	9 Q	358.55	10
Ooi Tze Liang	10 m platform	419.50	5 Q	433.70	2nd place, silver medalist(s)
Ahmad Amsyar Azman; Ooi Tze Liang	3 m synchronised springboard	—N/a		353.31	4
Ooi Tze Liang; Chew Yi Wei	10 m synchronised platform	—N/a		387.39	3

Women

Athlete	Event	Preliminaries		Final	
Athlete	Event	Points	Rank	Points	Rank
Cheong Jun Hoong	1 m springboard	265.80	4 Q	260.00	8
Traisy Vivien Tukiet	1 m springboard	219.30	12 Q	205.75	12
Cheong Jun Hoong	3 m springboard	257.15	12 Q	271.95	12
Ng Yan Yee	3 m springboard	310.95	5 Q	308.20	5
Nur Dhabitah Sabri	3 m springboard	292.35	7 Q	284.20	11
Cheong Jun Hoong	10 m platform	304.45	5 Q	332.60	6
Loh Zhiayi	10 m platform	259.25	12 Q	318.25	8
Pandelela Rinong	10 m platform	348.80	=1 Q	368.55	2nd place, silver medalist(s)
Cheong Jun Hoong; Loh Zhiayi	3 m synchronised springboard	—N/a		283.44	5
Nur Dhabitah Sabri; Ng Yan Yee	3 m synchronised springboard	—N/a		282.69	6
Pandelela Rinong; Nur Dhabitah Sabri	10 m synchronised platform	—N/a		300.12	3rd place, bronze medalist(s)
Cheong Jun Hoong; Leong Mun Yee	10 m synchronised platform	—N/a		298.92	4

== Gymnastics ==
=== Artistic ===
Men

Athlete	Event								
Athlete	Event	F Rank	PH Rank	R Rank	V Rank	PB Rank	HB Rank	Total	Rank
Hairi Zaid Ahmad Saruji	Qualification	13.333; 27	—N/a	10.133; 46	12.049; 18	11.800; 44	—N/a		
Nordin Mohd Hamzarudin	Qualification	12.066; 44	—N/a	10.833; 41	12.516; 17	—N/a			

Women

Athlete	Event						
Athlete	Event	F Rank	V Rank	UB Rank	BB Rank	Total	Rank
Farah Ann Abdul Hadi	Qualification	12.833; 16	13.933; 12	11.700; 25	12.166; 19	50.632	12 Q
Nur Eli Ellina Azmi	Qualification	11.808; 33	12.600; DNF	10.266; 37	11.266; 32	45.940	28
Tracie Ang	Qualification	13.066; 13	13.066; DNF	9.533; 43	10.316; 43	45.981	27
Yueh Tan Ing	Qualification	11.300; 40	13.433; 10 R	9.166; 46	11.333; 30	45.265	29
Farah Ann Abdul Hadi; Nur Eli Ellina Azmi; Tracie Ang; Yueh Tan Ing	Team all-around	37.707; 6	40.465; 8	31.499; 10	34.765; 8	144.436	8
Farah Ann Abdul Hadi	Individual all-around	12.966; 10	13.933; 8	12.066; 13	12.100; 11	51.065	11

=== Rhythmic ===
Athlete	Event						
Athlete	Event	Hoop Rank	Ball Rank	Clubs Rank	Ribbon Rank	Total	Rank
Amy Kwan Dict Weng	Qualification	14.400; 5 Q	13.625; 7 Q	13.750; 8 Q	13.750; 5 Q	55.525	6 Q
Fatin Zakirah Zain Jalany	Qualification	12.300; 14	11.300; 20	12.800; 12	11.675; 21	48.075	16
Wong Poh San	Qualification	14.550; 2 Q	12.250; 16	14.475; 5 Q	13.925; 1 Q	55.200	8 Q
Amy Kwan Dict Weng; Fatin Zakirah Zain Jalany; Wong Poh San	Team all-around	41.250; 2	37.175; 5	41.025; 2	39.350; 3	135.825	3rd place, bronze medalist(s)
Amy Kwan Dict Weng	Individual all-around	14.050; 6	14.050; 3	12.700; 10	12.675; 12	53.475	6
Wong Poh San	Individual all-around	14.250; 2	14.025; 5	13.400; 6	14.200; 2	55.875	4
Amy Kwan Dict Weng	Individual hoop	14.200; 6	—N/a				6
Wong Poh San	Individual hoop	14.650; 3	—N/a				3rd place, bronze medalist(s)
Amy Kwan Dict Weng	Individual ball	—N/a	13.650; 5	—N/a			5
Amy Kwan Dict Weng	Individual clubs	—N/a		13.900; 7	—N/a		7
Wong Poh San	Individual clubs	—N/a		13.375; 8	—N/a		8
Amy Kwan Dict Weng	Individual ribbon	—N/a			13.600; 4	—N/a	4
Wong Poh San	Individual ribbon	—N/a			14.250; 2	—N/a	2nd place, silver medalist(s)

== Hockey ==
=== Men's tournament ===
Roster

- Izwan Firdaus Ahmad Tajuddin
- Muhammad Rashid Baharom
- Muhammad Razie Abd Rahim (C)
- Baljit Singh Charun Singh
- Meor Muhamad Azuan Hasan
- Muhammad Azri Hassan
- Faiz Helmi Jali
- Kevin Frederick Lim
- Ahmad Kazamirul Nasruddin
- Shazril Irwan Nazli
- Muhammad Hafizuddin Othman (GK)
- Muhamad Ramadan Rosli
- Muhammad Shahril Saabah
- Muhammad Haziq Samsul
- Selvaraju Sandrakasi
- Norhizzat Sumantri

Pool B

Team	Pld	W	D	L	GF	GA	GD	Pts	Qualification
New Zealand	4	4	0	0	19	3	+16	12	Semi-finals
England	4	3	0	1	18	5	+13	9	Semi-finals
Canada	4	1	0	3	5	9	−4	3	
Malaysia	4	1	0	3	6	18	−12	3	
Trinidad and Tobago	4	1	0	3	6	19	−13	3	

Source: FIH

26 July 2014
11:00

Malaysia	2–0	Canada
Nasruddin 15'; Tajuddin 69'	Report

Umpires:
Peter Wright (RSA)
Dan Barstow (ENG)

27 July 2014
21:00

Malaysia	1–8	England
Saabah 26'	Report	Jackson 5', 44', 56', 61'; Dixon 50'; Gleghorne 64'; Roper 68'; Brogdon 69'

Umpires:
Raghu Prasad (IND)
Martin Madden (SCO)

29 July 2014
11:00

Trinidad and Tobago	4–2	Malaysia
Pierre 8'; Browne 12', 16', 35+'	Report	Sumantri 25'; Rosli 70'

Umpires:
Will Drury (WAL)
Gavin Caldecott (CAN)

31 July 2014
11:00

Malaysia	1–6	New Zealand
Rahim 59'	Report	Hayward 4', 48'; B. Shaw 29'; Haig 42'; Inglis 45'; McAleese 49'

Umpires:
Dan Barstow (ENG)
Haider Rasool (PAK)

Seventh and eighth place match

1 August 2014
20:00

Scotland	1–2	Malaysia
Grassick 12'	Report	Saabah 26'; Nasruddin 31'

Umpires:
Gareth Greenfield (NZL)
Lim Hong Zhen (SIN)

Ranked 7th in final standings

=== Women's tournament ===
Roster

- Nadia Abdul Rahman (C)
- Nuraini Abdul Rashid
- Surizan Awang Noh
- Norbaini Hashim
- Fatin Shafika Mohd Sukri
- Nurul Nabihah Mansur
- Noor Hasliza Md Ali
- Juliani Mohamad Din
- Rabiatul Adawiyah Mohamed
- Raja Norsharina Raja Shabuddin
- Siti Noor Amarina Ruhani
- Siti Shahida Saad
- Norazlin Sumantri
- Fazilla Sylvester Silin
- Farah Ayuni Yahya (GK)
- Siti Noor Hafiza Zainordin (GK)

Pool B

Team	Pld	W	D	L	GF	GA	GD	Pts	Qualification
Australia	4	4	0	0	25	0	+25	12	Semi-finals
England	4	3	0	1	9	4	+5	9	Semi-finals
Scotland	4	2	0	2	5	11	−6	6	
Malaysia	4	0	1	3	0	11	−11	1	
Wales	4	0	1	3	0	13	−13	1	

24 July 2014
09:00

Australia	4–0	Malaysia
Kenny 7'; White 20'; Parker 30', 49'	Report

Umpires:
Sarah Wilson (SCO)
Wendy Stewart (CAN)

25 July 2014
16:00

Scotland	2–0	Malaysia
Wyllie 26', 40'	Report

Umpires:
Aleesha Unka (NZL)
Miskarmalia Ariffin (SIN)

27 July 2014
11:00

England	5–0	Malaysia
Watton 17'; Ansley 35+'; Bray 42'; Danson 50'; Webb 70'	Report

Umpires:
Annelize Rostron (RSA)
Wendy Stewart (CAN)

30 July 2014
11:00

Malaysia	0–0	Wales
	Report

Umpires:
Kylie Seymour (AUS)
Alex Walker (SCO)

Seventh and eighth place match

31 July 2014
21:15

Canada	2–2	Malaysia
Stairs 15'; Gillis 55'	Report	Fatin 48'; Nabihah 66'
Penalties
Secco (penalty shoot-out missed); Raye (penalty shoot-out missed); Sandhu (penalty shoot-out missed)	0–3	(penalty shoot-out scored) Nuraini; (penalty shoot-out scored) Norbaini; (penalty shoot-out scored) Sumantri

Umpires:
Hannah Sanders (ENG)
Aleesha Unka (NZL)

Ranked 7th in final standings

== Judo ==
Men

Athlete	Event	Round of 32	Round of 16	Quarterfinals	Semifinals	Repechage	Bronze medal	Final	
Athlete	Event	Opposition Result	Opposition Result	Opposition Result	Opposition Result	Opposition Result	Opposition Result	Opposition Result	Rank
Mohd Farhan Uzair Mohd Fikri	−66 kg	A Nzige (TAN); W 1010–0000	C Oates (ENG); L 0001–1000	Did not advance					
Muhammad Ruzaini Abdul Razak	+100 kg	—N/a	P Kumar (IND); L 0000–1001	Did not advance					

Women

Athlete	Event	Round of 16	Quarterfinals	Semifinals	Repechage	Bronze medal	Final	
Athlete	Event	Opposition Result	Opposition Result	Opposition Result	Opposition Result	Opposition Result	Opposition Result	Rank
Nik Norlydiawati Nik Azman	−57 kg	S Inglis (SCO); L 0000–1000	Did not advance					

== Lawn bowls ==
Men

Athlete	Event	Group stage						Quarterfinal	Semifinal	Final	
Athlete	Event	Opposition Score	Opposition Score	Opposition Score	Opposition Score	Opposition Score	Rank	Opposition Score	Opposition Score	Opposition Score	Rank
Muhammad Hizlee Abdul Rais	Singles	S Bahadur (IND); W 21–20	S Tuikiligana (FIJ); W 21–19	M Shahzad (PAK); W 21–5	R Bester (CAN); L 11–21	—N/a	2 Q	A Sherriff (AUS); L 19–21	Did not advance		
Fairul Izwan Abdul Muin; Muhammad Hizlee Abdul Rais	Pairs	Papua New Guinea; W 12–11	Northern Ireland; W 22–14	Samoa; W 19–11	Canada; L 13–14	Malta; W 28–7	1 Q	Wales; W 17–9	Namibia; W 23–15	Gold medal match Scotland; L 3–20	2nd place, silver medalist(s)
Mohamad Fairus Abdul Jabal; Mohd Amir Mohammed Yusof; Zulhilmie Ridzuan	Triples	Papua New Guinea; W 17–15	England; L 13–15	Falkland Islands; W 31–8	Pakistan; W 24–12	Australia; L 15–17	3	Did not advance			
Fairul Izwan Abdul Muin; Mohamad Fairus Abdul Jabal; Mohd Amir Mohammed Yusof; Zulhilmie Ridzuan	Fours	New Zealand; T 14–14	Papua New Guinea; W 26–11	Australia; L 10–16	Norfolk Island; L 12–18	—N/a	4	Did not advance			

Women

Athlete	Event	Group stage						Quarterfinal	Semifinal	Final	
Athlete	Event	Opposition Score	Opposition Score	Opposition Score	Opposition Score	Opposition Score	Rank	Opposition Score	Opposition Score	Opposition Score	Rank
Siti Zalina Ahmad	Singles	N Saikia (IND); L 15–21	C Anderson (NFI); L 15–21	J Edwards (NZL); L 17–21	H Rereiti (NIU); W 21–2	—N/a	4	Did not advance			
Nor Hashimah Ismail; Siti Zalina Ahmad	Pairs	Papua New Guinea; W 17–13	Northern Ireland; L 12–24	Niue; W 29–5	Australia; L 14–18	—N/a	3	Did not advance			
Azlina Arshad; Emma Firyana Saroji; Nur Fidrah Noh	Triples	India; W 16–14	Jersey; W 28–7	Niue; W 26–8	Australia; L 10–20	—N/a	2 Q	England; L 6–24	Did not advance		
Azlina Arshad; Emma Firyana Saroji; Nor Hashimah Ismail; Nur Fidrah Noh	Fours	Niue; W 17–8	India; W 19–10	Northern Ireland; W 15–11	Fiji; W 22–12	—N/a	1 Q	Fiji; W 23–8	New Zealand; W 13–11	Gold medal match Scotland; L 9–14	2nd place, silver medalist(s)

Para-bowls

Athlete	Event	Group stage				Semifinal	Final	
Athlete	Event	Opposition Score	Opposition Score	Opposition Score	Rank	Opposition Score	Opposition Score	Rank
Mohd Abdillah Mat Rashid; Guide: Ahmad Firdaus Neo Abdullah; Siti Eleeni Ibrahim; Guide: Roslene Mohd Taib	Pairs	New Zealand; L 8–11	Canada; L 8–16	South Africa; L 7–18	4	Did not advance		
Ahmad Rashidi Talib; Rattna Aizah Mohd Idris; Shahidon Hanafiah	Triples	Scotland; L 6–25	England; L 9–19	Wales; L 14–15	4	Did not advance		

== Rugby sevens ==
=== Men's tournament ===
Malaysia has qualified a rugby sevens team.

Roster

- Nazuridin Abd Latiff
- Mohd Izwan Abu Bakar
- Muhammad Zharif Afandi
- Anwarul Hafiz Ahmad
- Zulkiflee Azmi
- Muhammad Faridzal Ismail
- Mohamad Amin Jamaluddin
- Marc Le
- Mohd Saizul Hafis Md Noor
- Muhammad Danial Noor Hamidi
- Mohd Syahir Asraf Rosli (C)
- Mohd Hafiizh Zainal

Pool C

Team	Pld	W	D	L	PF	PA	PD	Pts	Qualification
Samoa	3	3	0	0	106	26	+80	9	Medal competition
Wales	3	2	0	1	93	26	+67	7	Medal competition
Papua New Guinea	3	1	0	2	57	69	−12	5	Bowl competition
Malaysia	3	0	0	3	7	142	−135	3	Bowl competition

26 July 2014
12:00

Wales	52–0	Malaysia
	Report

Ibrox Stadium, Glasgow

26 July 2014
14:18

Papua New Guinea	36–7	Malaysia
	Report

Ibrox Stadium, Glasgow

26 July 2014
19:08

Samoa	54–0	Malaysia
	Report

Ibrox Stadium, Glasgow

Bowl
Quarterfinal

27 July 2014
10:54

Uganda	35–0	Malaysia
	Report

Ibrox Stadium, Glasgow

Shield
Semifinal

27 July 2014
13:34

Trinidad and Tobago	15–10	Malaysia
	Report

Ibrox Stadium, Glasgow

Ranked 15th in final standings

== Shooting ==
Men
Pistol/Small bore

Athlete	Event	Qualification		Final	
Athlete	Event	Points	Rank	Points	Rank
Mohd Hadafi Jaafar	10 m air rifle	607.3	13	Did not advance	
Muhammad Ezuan Nasir Khan	10 m air rifle	613.4	8 Q	119.7	6
Muhammad Hassanul Adzhar	50 m rifle prone	613.3	18	Did not advance	
Muhammad Ezuan Nasir Khan	50 m rifle prone	619.2	7 Q	139.7	5
Mohd Hadafi Jaafar	50 m rifle three positions	1140	8 Q	391.6	7
Mohammad Zubair Muhammad	50 m rifle three positions	1116	10	Did not advance	
Choo Wen Yan	50 m pistol	534	10	Did not advance	
Eddy Chew	50 m pistol	534	9	Did not advance	
Hasli Izwan Amir Hasan	25 m rapid fire pistol	556	6 Q	9	5
Khalel Abdullah	25 m rapid fire pistol	553	8	Did not advance	
Eddy Chew	10 m air pistol	569	6 Q	154.0	4
Jonathan Wong Guanjie	10 m air pistol	569	7 Q	94.3	7

Shotgun

Athlete	Event	Qualification		Semifinals		Final/BM	
Athlete	Event	Points	Rank	Points	Rank	Points	Rank
Bernard Yeoh Cheng Han	Trap	105	17	Did not advance			
Charles Chen Seong Fook	Trap	103	21	Did not advance			
Benjamin Khor Cheng Jie	Double trap	118	13	Did not advance			
Khor Seng Chye	Double trap	125	8	Did not advance			
Joseph Lee Joon Kit	Skeet	98	23	Did not advance			
Ricky Teh Chee Fei	Skeet	88	24	Did not advance			

Full bore

Athlete	Event	Stage 1	Stage 2	Stage 3	Total	
Athlete	Event	Points	Points	Points	Points	Rank
Rozli Mohamad	Individual	98–8v	146–11v	116-5v	360-24v	30
Shahrizal Ishak	Individual	103–5v	148–18v	126-6v	377-29v	22
Rozli Mohamad; Shahrizal Ishak	Pairs	293–29v	273–21v	—N/a	566–50v	12

Women
Pistol/Small bore

Athlete	Event	Qualification		Semifinals		Final	
Athlete	Event	Points	Rank	Points	Rank	Points	Rank
Nur Ayuni Farhana Abdul Halim	10 m air rifle	408.3	13	—N/a		Did not advance	
Nur Suryani Mohamed Taibi	10 m air rifle	411.7	7 Q	—N/a		184.4	3rd place, bronze medalist(s)
Muslifah Zulkifli	50 m rifle prone	—N/a				613.4	9
Nur Ayuni Farhana Abdul Halim	50 m rifle prone	—N/a				612.3	13
Muslifah Zulkifli	50 m rifle three positions	560	15	—N/a		Did not advance	
Nur Suryani Mohamed Taibi	50 m rifle three positions	574	2 Q	—N/a		422.0	4
Alia Sazana Azahari	25 m pistol	577	3 Q	13	3	8	4
Bibiana Ng Pei Chin	25 m pistol	569	5 Q	11	7	Did not advance	
Joseline Cheah Lee Yean	10 m air pistol	373	12	—N/a		Did not advance	
Wahidah Ismail	10 m air pistol	375	9	—N/a		Did not advance	

== Squash ==
Individual

Athlete	Event	Round of 128	Round of 64	Round of 32	Round of 16	Quarterfinals	Semifinals	Final	Rank
Athlete	Event	Opposition Score	Opposition Score	Opposition Score	Opposition Score	Opposition Score	Opposition Score	Opposition Score	Rank
Ivan Yuen (15)	Men's singles	Bye	R Prosper (SEY); W 3–0	B Hindle (MLT); W 3–1	A Walker (BOT); W 3–1	J Willstrop (ENG); L 0–3	Did not advance		
Mohd Nafiizwan Adnan (10)	Men's singles	Bye	R Maycock (BER); W 3–0	P Creed (GIB); W 3–0	P Barker (ENG); L 0–3	Did not advance			
Ong Beng Hee (8)	Men's singles	Bye	K Ndhlovu (ZAM); L 1–3	Did not advance					
Delia Arnold (15)	Women's singles	—N/a	Bye	A Alankamony (IND); W 3–0	D Pallikal (IND); L 0–3	Did not advance			
Low Wee Wern (5)	Women's singles	—N/a	Bye	E Bridgeman (CAY); W 3–0	T Evans (WAL); W 3–1	L Massaro (ENG); L 0–3	Did not advance		
Nicol David (1)	Women's singles	—N/a	Bye	V Florens (MRI); W 3–0	M Craig (NZL); W 3–0	J Duncalf (ENG); W 3–1	J King (NZL); W 3–0	Gold medal match L Massaro (ENG); W 3–0	1st place, gold medalist(s)

Doubles

Athletes	Event	Group stage				Round of 16	Quarterfinal	Semifinal	Final	Rank
Athletes	Event	Opposition Score	Opposition Score	Opposition Score	Rank	Opposition Score	Opposition Score	Opposition Score	Opposition Score	Rank
Valentino Bon Jovi Bong; Ivan Yuen (9)	Men's doubles	S M J Suari & K Walsh (PNG); W 2–0	G Lobban & S Crawford (SCO); L 1–2	J Bentick & K Hannaway (SVG); W 2–0	2 Q	P Creed & D Evans (WAL); L 0–2	Did not advance			
Nicol David; Low Wee Wern (4)	Women's doubles	M Craig & K Lindsay (NZL); W 2–1	D Pallikal & J Chinappa (IND); L 0–2	M Methsarani & N Udangawa (SRI); W 2–0	2 Q	—N/a	A Waters & E Beddoes (ENG); L 0–2	Did not advance		
Vanessa Raj; Rachel Arnold	Women's doubles	R Grinham & K Brown (AUS); L 0–2	K Borg Cauchi & C Sultana (MLT); W 2–0	L Camilleri & D Urquhart (AUS); L 0–2	3	—N/a	Did not advance			
Mohd Nafiizwan Adnan; Delia Arnold (8)	Mixed doubles	D Murphy & E Bridgeman (CAY); W 2–0	A Clyne & F Gillen-Buchert (SCO); L 0–2	S M J Suari & L Vai (PNG); W 2–0	2 Q	H P Sandhu & J Chinappa (IND); L 0–2	Did not advance			
Valentino Bon Jovi Bong; Rachel Arnold (16)	Mixed doubles	C Pilley & K Brown (AUS); L 0–2	A Arjoon & N Fernandes (GUY); W 2–0	—N/a	2 Q	M Knight & J King (NZL); L 0–2	Did not advance			

== Swimming ==
Men

Athlete	Event	Heat		Semifinal		Final	
Athlete	Event	Time	Rank	Time	Rank	Time	Rank
Lim Ching Hwang	50 m freestyle	24.27	30	Did not advance			
Lim Ching Hwang	100 m freestyle	51.65	21	Did not advance			
Welson Sim	100 m freestyle	51.51	20	Did not advance			
Lim Ching Hwang	200 m freestyle	1:51.39	19	—N/a		Did not advance	
Kevin Yeap	200 m freestyle	1:51.42	20	—N/a		Did not advance	
Vernon Lee	400 m freestyle	3:58.50	19	—N/a		Did not advance	
Welson Sim	400 m freestyle	3:59.37	21	—N/a		Did not advance	
Kevin Yeap	400 m freestyle	3:56.59	16	—N/a		Did not advance	
Vernon Lee	1500 m freestyle	16:10.53	15	—N/a		Did not advance	
Welson Sim	1500 m freestyle	16:18.24	17	—N/a		Did not advance	
Kevin Yeap	1500 m freestyle	15:35.50	13	—N/a		Did not advance	
Tern Jian Han	50 m backstroke	27.32	17	Did not advance			
Tern Jian Han	100 m backstroke	58.50	17	Did not advance			
Tern Jian Han	200 m backstroke	2:10.07	13	—N/a		Did not advance	
Shaun Yap	50 m breaststroke	29.60	17	Did not advance			
Shaun Yap	100 m breaststroke	1:06.49	22	Did not advance			
Vernon Lee; Lim Ching Hwang; Welson Sim; Kevin Yeap	4 × 100 m freestyle relay	3:27.78	10	—N/a		Did not advance	
Vernon Lee; Lim Ching Hwang; Welson Sim; Kevin Yeap	4 × 200 m freestyle relay	7:26.98 NR	8 Q	—N/a		7:26.74 NR	7
Lim Ching Hwang; Welson Sim; Tern Jian Han; Shaun Yap	4 × 100 m medley relay	3:53.90	11	—N/a		Did not advance	

Women

Athlete	Event	Heat		Semifinal		Final	
Athlete	Event	Time	Rank	Time	Rank	Time	Rank
Chui Lai Kwan	50 m freestyle	26.00 NR	15 Q	26.10	16	Did not advance	
Chui Lai Kwan	100 m freestyle	57.60	17	Did not advance			
Khoo Cai Lin	400 m freestyle	4:19.47	17	—N/a		Did not advance	
Khoo Cai Lin	800 m freestyle	8:54.45	14	—N/a		Did not advance	
Erika Kong	50 m breaststroke	33.51	17	Did not advance			
Christina Loh	50 m breaststroke	33.64	18	Did not advance			
Nadia Adrianna Redza Goh	50 m breaststroke	35.95	27	Did not advance			
Erika Kong	100 m breaststroke	1:13.23	21	Did not advance			
Christina Loh	100 m breaststroke	1:12.30	20	Did not advance			
Nadia Adrianna Redza Goh	100 m breaststroke	1:18.37	=28	Did not advance			
Christina Loh	200 m breaststroke	2:38.68	18	—N/a		Did not advance	
Nadia Adrianna Redza Goh	200 m breaststroke	2:41.94	21	—N/a		Did not advance	
Yap Siew Hui	50 m butterfly	28.30	21	Did not advance			
Yap Siew Hui	100 m butterfly	1:03.55	18	Did not advance			
Yap Siew Hui	200 m butterfly	2:22.55	21	—N/a		Did not advance	
Erika Kong	200 m individual medley	2:23.09	17	—N/a		Did not advance	
Nadia Adrianna Redza Goh	200 m individual medley	2:29.33	22	—N/a		Did not advance	
Erika Kong	400 m individual medley	5:00.72	12	—N/a		Did not advance	
Nadia Adrianna Redza Goh	400 m individual medley	5:07.54	13	—N/a		Did not advance	

== Table tennis ==
Singles

Athletes	Event	Preliminary round			Round of 32	Round of 16	Quarterfinal	Semifinal	Final	Rank
Athletes	Event	Opposition Score	Opposition Score	Rank	Opposition Score	Opposition Score	Opposition Score	Opposition Score	Opposition Score	Rank
Leong Chee Feng	Men's singles	K Tetabo (KIR); W 4–0	J Band (JER); W 4–0	1 Q	B Abiodun (NGR); L 0–4	Did not advance				
Muhamad Ashraf Haiqal Muhamad Rizal	Men's singles	G Sultan (SEY); W 4–0	M-A Dowell (BAR); W 4–0	1 Q	W Henzell (AUS); L 2–4	Did not advance				
Muhd Shakirin Ibrahim	Men's singles	C Gascoyne (JER); W 4–1	C Franklin (GUY); W 4–0	1 Q	A Baggaley (ENG); L 0–4	Did not advance				
Beh Lee Wei	Women's singles	Bye			A Edwards (TRI); W 4–0	C Li (NZL); W 4–3	Feng TW (SIN); L 0–4	Did not advance		
Ho Ying	Women's singles	L Sinon (SEY); W 4–0	D M Njani (KEN); W 4–0	1 Q	K Li (NZL); L 0–4	Did not advance				
Ng Sock Khim	Women's singles	M A Mohamed (TAN); W 4–0	E Warusawithana (SRI); W 4–2	1 Q	K Sibley (ENG); L WO	Did not advance				

Doubles

Athletes	Event	Round of 64	Round of 32	Round of 16	Quarterfinal	Semifinal	Final	Rank
Athletes	Event	Opposition Score	Opposition Score	Opposition Score	Opposition Score	Opposition Score	Opposition Score	Rank
Muhamad Ashraf Haiqal Muhamad Rizal; Muhd Shakirin Ibrahim	Men's doubles	—N/a	C Edwards & D O'Connell (WAL); W 3–1	Gao N & Li H (SIN); L 0–3	Did not advance			
Dunley Foo; Leong Chee Feng	Men's doubles	—N/a	Yang Z & Zhan J (SIN); L 0–3	Did not advance				
Beh Lee Wei; Ng Sock Khim	Women's doubles	—N/a	C Akpan & O Oshonaike (NGR); W 3–0	A Das & P Ghatak (IND); W 3–2	Luo A & Zhang M (CAN); L 0–3	Did not advance		
Lee Rou You; Ho Ying	Women's doubles	—N/a	I Chowree & W Gukhool (MRI); W 3–0	C Li & K Li (NZL); L 0–3	Did not advance			
Muhd Shakirin Ibrahim; Beh Lee Wei	Mixed doubles	N Esther & L Sinon (SEY); W 3–0	Zhan J & Feng TW (SIN); L 0–3	Did not advance				
Muhamad Ashraf Haiqal Muhamad Rizal; Lee Rou You	Mixed doubles	R Spencer & U Velox (SVG); W 3–0	C Chew & I Li (SIN); L 2–3	Did not advance				
Leong Chee Feng; Ho Ying	Mixed doubles	U Ranasingha & E Warusawithana (SRI); W 3–0	S Kamal & S Kumaresan (IND); L 0–3	Did not advance				
Dunley Foo; Ng Sock Khim	Mixed doubles	Yan X Zhang ZY (AUS); L 1–3	Did not advance					

Team

Athletes	Event	Preliminary round				First round	Quarterfinal	Semifinal	Final	Rank
Athletes	Event	Opposition Score	Opposition Score	Opposition Score	Rank	Opposition Score	Opposition Score	Opposition Score	Opposition Score	Rank
Dunley Foo; Leong Chee Feng; Muhamad Ashraf Haiqal Muhamad Rizal; Muhd Shakirin Ibrahim	Men's team	Zambia; W 3–0	Australia; L 2–3	Saint Lucia; W 3–0	=2 Q	India; L 0–3	Did not advance			
Beh Lee Wei; Ho Ying; Lee Rou You; Ng Sock Khim	Women's team	Papua New Guinea; W 3–0	Canada; W 3–2	Jamaica; W 3–0	1 Q	Nigeria; W 3–0	England; W 3–2	Australia; W 3–1	Gold medal match Singapore; L 0–3	2nd place, silver medalist(s)

== Weightlifting ==
Men

Athlete	Event	Snatch		Clean & jerk		Total	Rank
Athlete	Event	Result	Rank	Result	Rank	Total	Rank
Mohd Faizal Baharom	56 kg	110	2	—	—	—	DNF
Zulhelmi Md Pisol	56 kg	108	3	137	2	245	2nd place, silver medalist(s)
Constantine Clement	62 kg	120	3	146	6	266	6
Mohammad Huzairi Ramli	69 kg	127	7	163	3	290	5
Mohd Hafifi Mansor	69 kg	135	2	170	2	305	1st place, gold medalist(s)
Abd Mubin Rahim	77 kg	135	8	170	6	305	5
Loro Wellkinson Peuji	77 kg	—	—	—	—	—	DNF
Mohd Faiz Musa	94 kg	138	10	172	8	310	8

Women

Athlete	Event	Snatch		Clean & jerk		Total	Rank
Athlete	Event	Result	Rank	Result	Rank	Total	Rank
Sharifah Inani Najwa Syed Anuar	48 kg	—	—	—	—	—	DNF
Azizah Fadzil	53 kg	77	6	95	7	172	8
Frenceay Titus	53 kg	70	10	90	10	160	10
Nur Jannah Batrisyah	+75 kg	100	6	125	6	225	7

Powerlifting

Athlete	Event	Result	Rank
Jong Yee Khie	Men's +72 kg	178.0	3rd place, bronze medalist(s)
Mohd Shahmil Md Saad	Men's +72 kg	168.8	5
