= Wales at the 2014 Commonwealth Games =

- CG code: WAL
- CGA: Commonwealth Games Wales
- Website: teamwales.cymru/en/

in Glasgow, Scotland
- Flag bearers: Opening:Francesca Jones; Closing: Geraint Thomas
- Medals Ranked 13th: Gold 5 Silver 11 Bronze 20 Total 36

Commonwealth Games appearances (overview)
- 1930; 1934; 1938; 1950; 1954; 1958; 1962; 1966; 1970; 1974; 1978; 1982; 1986; 1990; 1994; 1998; 2002; 2006; 2010; 2014; 2018; 2022; 2026; 2030

Wales competed at the 2014 Commonwealth Games in Glasgow, Scotland. Prior to the games the Commonwealth Games Council for Wales set itself a target of 27 medals, surpassing the 2010 total of 20 medals won in Delhi. After the withdrawal of World champion competitors Helen Jenkins, Non Stanford and Becky James, Chef de Mission Brian Davies conceded that the initial target was optimistic, but the target was actually attained by 30 July, the sixth day of the competition. Wales finished 13th in the overall medal table (ranked in order of the number of gold medals won), but joint 8th, with Nigeria, in terms of the total medals won.

Wales finished with 36 medals, making the team the most successful Welsh squad in Commonwealth Games history. The country secured five gold medals, won by Francesca Jones (gymnastics), Geraint Thomas (cycling), Natalie Powell (judo), Jazz Carlin and Georgia Davies (swimming). Francesca Jones was the most successful member of the Welsh squad securing six medals, with five silvers to add to her gold. Other multiple medal athletes includes fellow gymnasts Laura Halford and Georgina Hockenhull, swimmer Jazz Carlin and cyclist Geraint Thomas. Gymnastics was the country's most successful sport winning ten medals, but podium finishes were achieved across ten of the 18 sports contested. Wales medal total also included four from para-sport events.

During the closing ceremony Francesca Jones was awarded the David Dixon Award as the outstanding athlete of the Games, reflecting not only her performance as a competitor but also as a role model to her sport and as an ambassador of fair play.

== Administration ==
The national body created to select the Wales team at the 2014 Commonwealth Games was the Commonwealth Games Council for Wales (CGCW) (Welsh: Cyngor Gemau Gymanwlad Cymru).

The CGCW Board is managed by its Council which is made up of members from all sports that can attend a Commonwealth Games. The chair of the board to see Team Wales through the Games is Helen Phillips, who is also the Chair of Wales Gymnastics. The Company Secretary is Sue Holvey while its directors are Deborah Godbold, Nicola Phillips and Ron Davies. The President of CGCW is Anne Ellis while the CEO is Chris Jenkins, the only full-time employed member of the board.

The chef de mission for Team Wales is Brian Davies, the first time he has held the position after serving on the team in the previous two competitions. Paralympic world record holding athlete Aled Davies was confirmed as team captain at the official team send-off at the Swalec Stadium in Cardiff on 23 June 2014.

== Build up to the Games ==
High Standards were set in the run up to the 2014 Commonwealth Games for the Wales team, with a target of 27 medals set by the Commonwealth Games Council for Wales. This surpassed the team's total achieved at the 2010 Commonwealth Games in Delhi. The first major set back for the team was the withdrawal in June of world triathlete champion Non Stanford, who was unable to recover in time from a stress fracture to her ankle. Two weeks later it was announced that double cycling world champion Becky James would also be withdrawing from the Games, also due to an injury. A week before the Games began triathlete Helen Jenkins, another medal hopeful, was forced to leave the Welsh team, again through injury. Other team members forced to withdraw through injury close to the opening of the Games included weightlifter Faye Pittman and judoka Kyle Davies.

As well as the athletes who left the squad through injury, several hopefuls' withdrawals were more controversial. On 16 July it was announced that 800m runner Gareth Warburton had been charged with anti-doping rule violations and was unable to be selected, this was followed on the opening day of the Games with the withdrawal of 400m hurdler and team Wales vice captain Rhys Williams again after failing a drug test at a Grand Prix event earlier that month.

Further disappointment for Welsh medal hopes came from the boxing team. Olympic silver medalist Fred Evans was unable to compete after long negotiations between the Welsh camp and the Home Office and Games officials resulting in a refusal of accreditation. Earlier in the year Evans had admitted his part in a nightclub assault. A second loss from the boxing team was female fighter Ashley Brace, who was disqualified from taking part in the Games as she was adjudged to have once been a professional kick-boxer and was thus not an amateur fighter.

The loss of so many world class athletes led Chef de Mission Brian Davies to conceded that the initial target of 27 medals was now optimistic.

== Medalists ==
Medal	Name	Sport	Event	Date
Gold	Francesca Jones	Rhythmic gymnastics	Women's rhythmic individual ribbon	26 July
Gold	Natalie Powell	Judo	Women's 78 kg	26 July
Gold	Jazz Carlin	Swimming	Women's 800 metre freestyle	28 July
Gold	Georgia Davies	Swimming	Women's 50 metre backstroke	29 July
Gold	Geraint Thomas	Cycling	Men's road race	3 August
Silver	Francesca Jones; Laura Halford; Nikara Jenkins	Rhythmic gymnastics	Women's rhythmic team all-around	24 July
Silver	Francesca Jones	Rhythmic gymnastics	Women's rhythmic individual all-around	25 July
Silver	Elena Allen	Shooting	Women's skeet	25 July
Silver	Francesca Jones	Rhythmic gymnastics	Women's rhythmic individual hoop	26 July
Silver	Francesca Jones	Rhythmic gymnastics	Women's rhythmic individual ball	26 July
Silver	Francesca Jones	Rhythmic gymnastics	Women's rhythmic individual clubs	26 July
Silver	Georgia Davies	Swimming	Women's 100 metre backstroke	26 July
Silver	Elinor Barker	Cycling	Women's points race	27 July
Silver	Aled Davies	Athletics	Men's discus throw F42/44	28 July
Silver	Jazz Carlin	Swimming	Women's 400 metre freestyle	29 July
Silver	Sally Peake	Athletics	Women's pole vault	2 August
Bronze	Laura Halford	Rhythmic gymnastics	Women's rhythmic individual all-around	25 July
Bronze	Calum Jarvis	Swimming	Men's 200 metre freestyle	25 July
Bronze	Matt Ellis; Ieuan Williams (pilot)	Cycling	Men's tandem 1km time trial B	25 July
Bronze	Laura Halford	Rhythmic gymnastics	Women's rhythmic individual ball	26 July
Bronze	Elinor Barker	Cycling	Women's scratch race	26 July
Bronze	Michaela Breeze	Weightlifting	Women's 58 kg	26 July
Bronze	Jack Thomas	Swimming	Men's 200 metre freestyle S14	26 July
Bronze	Mark Shaw	Judo	Men's +100 kg	26 July
Bronze	Paul Taylor; Jonathan Tomlinson; Marc Wyatt	Lawn bowls	Men's triples	28 July
Bronze	Rhys Jones	Athletics	Men's 100 m T37	28 July
Bronze	Craig Pilling	Wrestling	Men's freestyle 57 kg	29 July
Bronze	Elizabeth Beddoe; Georgina Hockenhull; Jessica Hogg; Angel Romaeo; Raer Theaker	Artistic gymnastics	Women's artistic team all-around	29 July
Bronze	Daniel Jervis	Swimming	Men's 1500 metre freestyle	29 July
Bronze	Geraint Thomas	Cycling	Men's road time trial	31 July
Bronze	Sean McGoldrick	Boxing	Men's Bantamweight	1 August
Bronze	Nathan Thorley	Boxing	Men's Light heavyweight	1 August
Bronze	Georgina Hockenhull	Artistic gymnastics	Women's balance beam	1 August
Bronze	Lauren Price	Boxing	Women's middleweight	1 August
Bronze	Ashley Williams	Boxing	Men's Light flyweight	1 August
Bronze	Joseph Cordina	Boxing	Men's Lightweight	1 August

Medals by sport
Sport	gold	silver	bronze	Total
Athletics	0	2	1	3
Badminton	0	0	0	0
Boxing	0	0	5	5
Cycling	1	1	3	5
Gymnastics	1	5	4	10
Hockey	0	0	0	0
Judo	1	0	1	2
Lawn bowls	0	0	1	1
Netball	0	0	0	0
Rugby sevens	0	0	0	0
Shooting	0	1	0	1
Squash	0	0	0	0
Swimming	2	2	3	7
Table tennis	0	0	0	0
Triathlon	0	0	0	0
Weightlifting	0	0	1	1
Wrestling	0	0	1	1
Total	5	11	20	36

== Athletics ==
Men
Track & road events

Athlete	Event	Heat		Semifinal		Final	
Athlete	Event	Result	Rank	Result	Rank	Result	Rank
Rhys Jones	100 m (T37)	12.10	2 Q	—N/a		12.04	3rd place, bronze medalist(s)
Joe Thomas	800 m	1:49.38	3 Q	1:50.08	7	Did not advance	
Chris Gowell	1,500 m	3:40.30	4 Q	—N/a		3:42.10	10
Adam Bitchell	10,000 m	—N/a				28:47.94	15
Dewi Griffiths	10,000 m	—N/a				31:28.81	25
Dai Greene	400 m hurdles	50.36	5	—N/a		Did not advance	
Andrew Davies	Marathon	—N/a				2:18:59	17

Field Events

Athlete	Event	Qualification		Final	
Athlete	Event	Distance	Rank	Distance	Rank
Paul Walker	Pole Vault	—N/a		5:35	5
Brett Morse	Discus throw	59.85	5 q	60.48	5
Aled Davies	Discus throw F42/44	—N/a		46.83	2nd place, silver medalist(s)
Jonathan Edwards	Hammer throw	63.66	8	Did not advance	
Osian Jones	Hammer throw	61.30	9	Did not advance	
Matthew Richards	Hammer throw	58.52	10	Did not advance	
Lee Doran	Javelin throw	75.82	11 Q	72.73	8
Ryan Spencer-Jones	Shot put	16.78	17	Did not advance	
Gareth Winter	Shot put	17.33	15	Did not advance	

Combined events – Decathlon

Athlete	Event	100 m	LJ	SP	HJ	400 m	110H	DT	PV	JT	1500 m	Final	Rank
David Guest	Result	10.95	7.01	12.43	1.87	48.08	14.70	43.14	4.50	51.93	4:51.23	7516	8
David Guest	Points	872	1688	2321	3008		4799	5528	6288	6905	7516	7516	8
Benjamin Gregory	Result	11.26	7.42	13.03	1.90	50.49	14.70	40.40	5.00	54,05	4:34.89	7725	6
Benjamin Gregory	Points	804	1719	2388	3102	3894	4780	5453	6363	7012	7639	7725	6
Curtis Matthews	Result	11.03	7.20	13.53	1.84	50.94	14.88	47.85	4.30	52.09	4:59.72	7422	10
Curtis Matthews	Points	854	1716	2416	3077	3849	4713	5539	6241	6861	7422	7422	10

Women
Track & road events

Athlete	Event	Heat		Semifinal		Final	
Athlete	Event	Result	Rank	Result	Rank	Result	Rank
Tracey Hinton; Steffan Hughes (guide)	100 m (T12)	13.79	1 Q	—N/a		13.65	4
Elinor Kirk	5,000 m	—N/a				15:57.67	12
Elinor Kirk	10,000 m	—N/a				33:22.40	9
Hannah Brier; Rachel Johncock; Mica Moore; Hannah Thomas	4 × 100 m relay	44.66	4 Q	—N/a		44.51	7

Field Events

Athlete	Event	Qualification		Final	
Athlete	Event	Distance	Rank	Distance	Rank
Olivia Breen	Long jump F37/38	—N/a		4.06	4
Beverley Jones	Long jump F37/38	—N/a		3.71	6
Sally Peake	Pole vault	—N/a		4.25m	2nd place, silver medalist(s)
Carys Parry	Hammer throw	64.72	4 Q	65.37	5

== Badminton ==
Singles & doubles

Athlete	Event	Round of 64	Round of 32	Round of 16	Quarterfinal	Semifinal	Final / BM	
Athlete	Event	Opposition Score	Opposition Score	Opposition Score	Opposition Score	Opposition Score	Opposition Score	Rank
Daniel Font	Men's singles	Tawana (BOT); W 2 – 0	Kidambi (IND); L 0 – 2	Did not advance				
Daniel Font; Oliver Gwilt	Men's doubles		Henry & Palmer (JAM); W 2 – 0	Dennerly-Minturn & Leydon-Davis (NZL); Walkover	Adcock & Ellis (ENG); L 1 – 2	Did not advance		
Joe Morgan; Nic Strange	Men's doubles	—N/a	Chrisnanta & Triyachart (SIN); L 0 – 2	Did not advance				
Carissa Turner	Women's singles	Muthoni (KEN); W 2 – 0	Johnson (GUE); W 2 – 0	Chan (NZL); L 0 – 2	Did not advance			
Carissa Turner; Sarah Thomas	Women's doubles	—N/a	Guan & Somerville (AUS); W 2 – 1	Bruce & Chan (CAN); L 0 – 2	Did not advance			
Oliver Gwilt; Sarah Thomas	Mixed doubles	Leydon-Davis & Leydon Davis (NZL); L 1 – 2	Did not advance					

Mixed team

Pool D

Pos	Team	Pld	W	L	GF	GA	GD	PF	PA	PD	Pts	Qualification
1	Canada	3	3	0	25	6	+19	626	386	+240	3	Quarterfinals
2	Australia	3	2	1	23	8	+15	596	412	+184	2	Quarterfinals
3	Wales	3	1	2	14	18	−4	556	494	+62	1	
4	Falkland Islands	3	0	3	0	30	−30	144	630	−486	0	

Source: glasgow2014.com

Australia
4
Commonwealth Arena, Glasgow
24 July

Wales
1

			1	2	3
1	(Australia) (Wales)	Ross Smith / Renuga Veeran; Sarah Thomas / Oliver Gwilt	21; 15	21; 12
2	(Australia) (Wales)	Jeff Tho; Daniel Font	16; 21	21; 13	13; 21
3	(Australia) (Wales)	Verdet Kessler; Carissa Turner	22; 20	21; 13
4	(Australia) (Wales)	Ross Smith / Robin Middleton; Joe Morgan / Nicolas Strange	21; 12	21; 14
5	(Australia) (Wales)	Renuga Veeran / He Tian Tang; Sarah Thomas / Carissa Turner	21; 16	21; 13

Canada
4
Commonwealth Arena, Glasgow
25 July

Wales
1

			1	2	3
1	(Canada) (Wales)	Toby Ng / Alex Bruce; Sarah Thomas / Oliver Gwilt	21; 9	21; 12
2	(Canada) (Wales)	Andrew D'Souza; Daniel Font	21; 17	21; 15
3	(Canada) (Wales)	Michelle Li; Carissa Turner	21; 14	21; 14
4	(Canada) (Wales)	Adrian Liu / Derrick Ng; Joe Morgan / Nicolas Strange	27; 25	21; 14
5	(Canada) (Wales)	Alex Bruce / Phyllis Chan; Sarah Thomas / Carissa Turner	16; 21	21; 14	18; 21

Falkland Islands
0
Commonwealth Arena, Glasgow
25 July

Wales
5

			1	2	3
1	(Falkland Islands) (Wales)	Douglas Clark / Anna Luxton; Sarah Thomas / Oliver Gwilt	6; 21	11; 21
2	(Falkland Islands) (Wales)	Ross Stewart; Daniel Font	6; 21	5; 21
3	(Falkland Islands) (Wales)	Sofia Arkhipkina; Carissa Turner	2; 21	1; 21
4	(Falkland Islands) (Wales)	Dominic Jaffray / Christopher Enyon; Joe Morgan / Nicolas Strange	4; 21	5; 21
5	(Falkland Islands) (Wales)	Sofia Arkhipkina / Anna Luxton; Sarah Thomas / Carissa Turner	4; 21	2; 21

== Boxing ==
Men

Athlete	Event	Round of 32	Round of 16	Quarterfinals	Semifinals	Final	
Athlete	Event	Opposition Result	Opposition Result	Opposition Result	Opposition Result	Opposition Result	Rank
Ashley Williams	Light flyweight	Bye	Máquina (MOZ); W 3 – 0	Redzuan (MAS); W 3 – 0	Singh (IND); L' 0 – 3	Did not advance	3rd place, bronze medalist(s)
Andrew Selby	Flyweight	Mcfadden (SCO); L 0 – 3	Did not advance				
Sean McGoldrick	Bantamweight	Bye	Woods (AUS); W 2 – 1	Sonjica (RSA); W 2 – 1	Conlan (NIR); L 0 – 3	Did not advance	3rd place, bronze medalist(s)
Joseph Cordina	Lightweight	McCormack (ENG); W 2 – 1	Gauthier (CAN); W 3 – 0	Milnes (NZL); W 3 – 0	Flynn (SCO); L 0 – 2	Did not advance	3rd place, bronze medalist(s)
Zack Davies	Light welterweight	Dlamini (SWZ); W 3 – 0	Shogbamu (NGR); W 3 – 0	Taylor (SCO); L 0 – 3	Did not advance		
Nathan Thorley	Light heavyweight	Bye	Taualii (TON); W KO1	Aska (ANT); W KO1	St Pierre (MRI); L TKO3	Did not advance	3rd place, bronze medalist(s)
Kody Davies	Heavyweight	—N/a	Lavelle (SCO); L 0-3	Did not advance			

Women

Athlete	Event	Round of 16	Quarterfinals	Semifinals	Final	
Athlete	Event	Opposition Result	Opposition Result	Opposition Result	Opposition Result	Rank
Charlene Jones	Lightweight	Arachchi (SRI); W 3 – 0	Devi (IND); L 1 – 2	Did not advance		
Lauren Price	Middleweight	London (GUY); W 3 – 0	Scott (AUS); W 3 – 0	Fortin (CAN); L 1 – 2	Did not advance	3rd place, bronze medalist(s)

== Cycling ==
=== Road ===
Men

Athlete	Event	Time	Rank
Scott Davies	Road race	4:23:15	10
Owain Doull	Road race	DNF	
Sam Harrison	Road race	DNF	
Jon Mould	Road race	DNF	
Luke Rowe	Road race	4:17:37	6
Geraint Thomas	Road race	4:13:05	1st place, gold medalist(s)
Geraint Thomas	Time trial	47:55.82	3rd place, bronze medalist(s)

Women

Athlete	Event	Time	Rank
Elinor Barker	Road race	DNF	
Katie Curtis	Road race	DNF	
Hayley Jones	Road race	DNF	
Amy Roberts	Road race	2:44:12	14

=== Track ===
Sprint

Athlete	Event	Qualification		Round 1	Repechage	Quarterfinals	Semifinals	Final	
Athlete	Event	Time	Rank	Opposition Time	Opposition Time	Opposition Time	Opposition Time	Opposition Time	Rank
Lewis Oliva	Men's sprint	10.171	8 Q	Crampton (NZL); L	Skinner (SCO); Kenny (ENG); L, L	Did not advance			
Matt Ellis; Ieuan Williams	Men's tandem sprint B	10.409	3 Q	—N/a			Fachie/ MacLean (SCO); L, L	Bronze medal final Clarke/ Kennedy (AUS); L, L	4
Rhiannon Henry; Rachel James	Women's tandem sprint B	11.917	5	—N/a			Did not advance		

Pursuit

Athlete	Event	Qualification		Final	
Athlete	Event	Time	Rank	Opponent Results	Rank
Owain Doull	Men's pursuit	4:21.369	3 Q	Ryan (NZL); 4:25.664 L	4
Elinor Barker	Women's pursuit	3:36.803	7	Did not advance	
Ciara Horne	Women's pursuit	3:45.119	15	Did not advance	
Amy Roberts	Women's pursuit	3:42.623	13	Did not advance	

Points race

Athlete	Event	Qualification		Final	
Athlete	Event	Points	Rank	Points	Rank
Owain Doull	Men's point race	1	12 Q	75	4
Sam Harrison	Men's point race	9	6 Q	DNF	
Jonathan Mould	Men's point race	28	2 Q	DNF	
Elinor Barker	Women's points race	—N/a		37	2nd place, silver medalist(s)
Hayley Jones	Women's points race	—N/a		0	20
Amy Roberts	Women's points race	—N/a		1	15

Scratch race

Athlete	Event	Qualification	Final
Athlete	Event	Rank	Rank
Owain Doull	Men's scratch race	12 Q	15
Sam Harrison	Men's scratch race	11 Q	7
Jonathan Mould	Men's scratch race	10 Q	DNF
Elinor Barker	Women's scratch race	—N/a	3rd place, bronze medalist(s)
Katie Curtis	Women's scratch race	—N/a	7
Amy Roberts	Women's scratch race	—N/a	13

Keirin

Athlete	Event	Round 1	Repechage	Semifinals	Final
Athlete	Event	Rank	Rank	Rank	Rank
Lewis Oliva	Men's keirin	3 R	2	Did not advance	

== Gymnastics ==
=== Artistic ===
Men
Team

Athlete	Event	Apparatus						Total	Rank
Athlete	Event	Floor	Pommel horse	Rings	Vault	Parallel bars	Horizontal bar	Total	Rank
Jac Davies	Team		14.500						
Iwan Mepham	Team	14.200	12.308	13.266	13.183	13.800	13.336	80.123	
Harry Owen	Team	13.566	11.933	12.233	13.266	13.033	10.966	74.997	
Clinton Purnell	Team	14.533	13.400	14.333	12.933	12.733	13.366	81.298	
Robert Sansby	Team	13.033		11.966	13.366	12.333	12.933		
Total	Team	42.299	40.208	39.832	39.815	39.566	39.665	241.385	5

Individual

Athlete	Event	Apparatus						Total	Rank
Athlete	Event	Floor	Pommel horse	Rings	Vault	Parallel bars	Horizontal bar	Total	Rank
Clinton Purnell	All-around	14.366	13.133	14.233	14.333	12.900	13.333	82.298	7
Iwan Mepham	All-around	12.033	12.133	13.466	13.500	13.666	12.833	77.631	13
Harry Owen	All-around	13.300	12.700	12.900	13.300	12.966	11.275	76.441	20
Clinton Purnell	Floor	14.366	—N/a						5
Jac Davies	Pommel horse	—N/a	14.800	—N/a					4
Clinton Purnell	Pommel horse	—N/a	12.966	—N/a					8
Clinton Purnell	Rings	—N/a		14.533	—N/a				6

Women
Team

Athlete	Event	Apparatus				Total	Rank
Athlete	Event	Floor	Vault	Uneven bars	Balance beam	Total	Rank
Lizzie Beddoe	Team	13.166	13.900	13.533	13.166	53.765	
Georgina Hockenhull	Team	12.366	13.666	12.666	13.333	52.031	
Jessica Hogg	Team	13.266	13.766	—N/a	12.366	—N/a	
Angel Romaeo	Team	12.700	—N/a	13.033	13.066	—N/a	—N/a
Raer Theaker	Team	—N/a	13.866	13.300	—N/a		
Total	Team	39.132	41.532	39.866	39.565	160.095	3rd place, bronze medalist(s)

Individual

Athlete	Event	Apparatus				Total	Rank
Athlete	Event	Floor	Vault	Uneven bars	Balance beam	Total	Rank
Lizzie Beddoe	All-around	13.533	13.808	13.533	11.666	52.540	8
Georgina Hockenhull	All-around	11.966	13.566	13.333	13.733	52.598	6
Jessica Hogg	Floor	13.166	—N/a			—N/a	5
Lizzie Beddoe	Uneven bars	—N/a		11.633	—N/a	—N/a	7
Raer Theaker	Uneven bars	—N/a		8.333	—N/a	—N/a	8
Lizzie Beddoe	Balance beam	—N/a			13.366	—N/a	4
Georgina Hockenhull	Balance beam	—N/a			13.466	—N/a	3rd place, bronze medalist(s)

=== Rhythmic ===
Individual

Athlete	Event	Qualification						Final					
Athlete	Event	Hoop	Ball	Clubs	Ribbon	Total	Rank	Hoop	Ball	Clubs	Ribbon	Total	Rank
Francesca Jones	All-around	14.000	14.450	15.150	13.675	57.275	2 Q	14.250	14.200	14.700	14.200	57.350	2nd place, silver medalist(s)
Laura Halford	All-around	14.500	14.200	13.500	13.400	55.600	5 Q	14.500	13.975	14.500	13.250	56.225	3rd place, bronze medalist(s)
Nikara Jenkins	All-around	11.200	11.550	11.900	11.850	46.500	20	Did not advance					

Individual finals

Athlete	Event	Total	Rank
Laura Halford	Ball	14.550	3rd place, bronze medalist(s)
Laura Halford	Hoop	14.250	5
Laura Halford	Ribbon	12.850	8
Francesca Jones	Ball	14.875	2nd place, silver medalist(s)
Francesca Jones	Clubs	14.800	2nd place, silver medalist(s)
Francesca Jones	Hoop	14.750	2nd place, silver medalist(s)
Francesca Jones	Ribbon	14.500	1st place, gold medalist(s)

Team

Athlete	Event	Final					
Athlete	Event	Rope	Hoop	Ball	Ribbon	Total	Rank
Francesca Jones; Laura Halford; Nikara Jenkins	Team	39.700	40.200	40.550	38.925	136.625	2nd place, silver medalist(s)

== Hockey ==
Men

- Liam Brignull
- Benjamin Carless
- Andrew Cornick
- Owain Dolan-Gray
- Gareth Furlong
- Richard Gay
- Rhys Gowman
- Huw Jones
- David Kettle (gk)
- Daniel Kyriakides
- James Kyriakides
- Lewis Prosser
- Nicholas Rees
- Matthew Ruxton
- Michael Shaw
- Peter Swainson
- Coach: Zak Jones

Pool A

Pos	Team	Pld	W	D	L	GF	GA	GD	Pts	Qualification
1	Australia	4	4	0	0	22	3	+19	12	Semi-finals
2	India	4	3	0	1	16	9	+7	9	Semi-finals
3	South Africa	4	2	0	2	9	12	−3	6	
4	Scotland	4	1	0	3	6	16	−10	3	
5	Wales	4	0	0	4	6	19	−13	0	

Source: FIH
Rules for classification: 1) points; 2) goal difference; 3) goals scored; 4) head-to-head result.

25 July 2014
09:00

India	3–1	Wales
Raghunath 20'; R. Singh 42'; Chandi 47'	Report	Cornick 23'

Umpires:
Peter Wright (RSA)
Lim Hong Zhen (SIN)

26 July 2014
14:00

Australia	7–1	Wales
Ciriello 6'; Govers 7'; Whetton 29', 44', 46'; Gohdes 66', 69'	Report	Kyriakides 50'

Umpires:
Martin Madden (SCO)
Gavin Caldecott (CAN)

28 July 2014
11:00

Scotland	4–3	Wales
Grassick 14'; McIntyre 40'; Coultas 41'; Parkes 61'	Report	Gay 1', 3', 31'

Umpires:
Peter Wright (RSA)
Raghu Prasad (IND)

29 July 2014
16:00

Wales	1–5	South Africa
Gay 67'	Report	Malgraff 9'; Smith 35+', 44'; Hykes 46'; Eustice 64'

Umpires:
Eric Koh (MAS)
Lim Hong Zhen (SIN)

Women

- Abi Welsford, forward
- Leah Wilkinson, defender
- Ria Male, goalkeeper
- Katrin Budd, midfielder
- Alys Brooks, midfielder
- Sian French, midfielder
- Sarah Jones, midfielder
- Phoebe Richards, forward
- Elen Barnes, defender
- Beth Bingham, defender
- Carys Tucker, midfielder
- Xenna Hughes, defender
- Eloise Laity, forward
- Emma Batten, forward
- Jo Westwood, defender
- Danni Jordan, forward

Pool B

Team	Pld	W	D	L	GF	GA	GD	Pts	Qualification
Australia	4	4	0	0	25	0	+25	12	Semi-finals
England	4	3	0	1	9	4	+5	9	Semi-finals
Scotland	4	2	0	2	5	11	−6	6	
Malaysia	4	0	1	3	0	11	−11	1	
Wales	4	0	1	3	0	13	−13	1	

24 July 2014
11:00

England	2–0	Wales
Danson 29'; White 63'	Report

Umpires:
Aleesha Unka (NZL)
Ayana McClean (TRI)

25 July 2014
14:00

Australia	9–0	Wales
Kenny 12', 22', 26'; Parker 14', 45', 50'; Smith 25'; Peris 40'; Nanscawen 53'	Report

Umpires:
Annelize Rostron (RSA)
Nur Hafizah Azman (MAS)

28 July 2014
16:00

Wales	0–2	Scotland
	Report	Bell 9'; Clement 27'

Umpires:
Ayanna McClean (TTO)
Annelize Rostron (RSA)

30 July 2014
11:00

Malaysia	0–0	Wales
	Report

Umpires:
Kylie Seymour (AUS)
Alex Walker (SCO)

== Judo ==
Men

Athlete	Event	Round of 32	Round of 16	Quarterfinals	Semifinals	Repechage	Bronze medal	Final	
Athlete	Event	Opposition Result	Opposition Result	Opposition Result	Opposition Result	Opposition Result	Opposition Result	Opposition Result	Rank
Brandon Dodge	−60 kg	—N/a	C Trikomitis (CYP); W 1011–0000	N Chana (IND); L 1101–0101	Did not advance				
Jamie Macdonald	66 kg	L Smith (SLE); W W/O	S Mabulu (RSA); L 1000–0001	Did not advance					
Curtis Dodge	73 kg	A Leat (NZL); L 000-100	Did not advance						
Connor Ireland	73 kg	D Williams (ENG); L 000-002	Did not advance						
Craig Ewers	81 kg	J Burt (CAN); L 0001-1000	Did not advance						
Ruslan Rancev	100 kg	—N/a	M Kombo (TAN); W 1000-0001	T Slyfield (NZL); L 0001-0013	—N/a	D Didier (AUS); L 0000-1002	Did not advance		
Mark Shaw	+100 kg	—N/a	D Sua (SAM); W 1100-0004	J Andrewartha (AUS); L 0100-1003	—N/a	M Rygielski (CAN); W 1001-0002	S Rosser (NZL); W 1001-0002	Did not advance	3rd place, bronze medalist(s)

Women

Athlete	Event	Round of 16	Quarterfinals	Semifinals	Repechage	Bronze medal	Final	
Athlete	Event	Opposition Result	Opposition Result	Opposition Result	Opposition Result	Opposition Result	Opposition Result	Rank
Jade Lewis	52 kg	K Edwards (ENG); L 000–100	Did not advance					
Kirsty Powell	57 kg	C Rahming (BAH); W 1000–0000	N Davis (ENG); L 0001–1000	—N/a	C Ramsay (SCO); L 0003–1000	Did not advance		
Natalie Powell	78 kg	—N/a	Bye	AL Portuondo (CAN); W 1100–0001	—N/a	—N/a	G Gibbons (ENG); W 0011–0002	1st place, gold medalist(s)

== Lawn Bowls ==
Men

Athlete	Event	Preliminary round						Quarterfinals	Semifinals	Final/BM	Rank
Athlete	Event	Match 1	Match 2	Match 3	Match 4	Match 5	Rank	Quarterfinals	Semifinals	Final/BM	Rank
Athlete	Event	Opposition Result	Opposition Result	Opposition Result	Opposition Result	Opposition Result	Rank	Opposition Result	Opposition Result	Opposition Result	Rank
Robert Weale	Singles	Njuguna (KEN); W 21 – 8	Tolchard (ENG); L 12 – 21	Tagelagi (NIU); W 21 – 18	Sherrif (AUS); L 11 – 21	—N/a	Did not advance				
Mark Harding; Robert Weale	Pairs	Fiji; W 18 – 12	India; W 26 – 14	England; L 10 – 21		—N/a	2 Q	Malaysia; L 9 – 17	Did not advance		
Paul Taylor; Jonathan Tomlinson; Marc Wyatt	Triples	Niue; W 34 – 5	Namibia; W 24 – 7		India; W 17 – 13	Scotland; W 17 – 10	1 Q	England; W 16 – 15	Northern Ireland; L 12 – 20	Australia; W 16 – 13	3rd place, bronze medalist(s)
Mark Harding; Paul Taylor; Jonathan Tomlinson; Marc Wyatt	Fours		Fiji; W 13 – 7	Kenya; W 21 – 7	Niue; W 32 – 10	Scotland; L 9 – 12	2 Q	Australia; L 14 – 19	Did not advance		

Women

Athlete	Event	Preliminary round						Quarterfinals	Semifinals	Final/BM	Rank
Athlete	Event	Match 1	Match 2	Match 3	Match 4	Match 5	Rank	Quarterfinals	Semifinals	Final/BM	Rank
Athlete	Event	Opposition Result	Opposition Result	Opposition Result	Opposition Result	Opposition Result	Rank	Opposition Result	Opposition Result	Opposition Result	Rank
Caroline Taylor	Singles	Like (ZAM); W 21 – 15	Brown (SCO); L 18 – 21	McGreal (IOM); W 21 – 10	Cottrell (AUS); W 21 – 11	Beere (GUE); L 17 – 21	2 Q	McMillen (NIR); L 17 – 21	Did not advance		
Anwen Butten; Caroline Taylor	Pairs	Canada; W 19 – 10	Cook Islands; W 14 – 13	England; D 15 – 15		—N/a	2 Q	South Africa; L 15 – 20	Did not advance		
Lisa Forey; Kelly Packwood; Kathy Pearce	Triples		Norfolk Island; W 14 – 12	South Africa; L 13 – 14			2 Q	New Zealand; W 14 – 13	England; L 13 – 18	South Africa; L 14 – 23	4
Anwen Butten; Lisa Forey; Kelly Packwood; Kathy Pearce	Fours	Zambia; L 9 – 16		Papua New Guinea; L 6 – 13		—N/a		Did not advance			

Mixed para-sport

Athlete	Event	Preliminary round				Semifinals	Final/BM	Rank
Athlete	Event	Match 1	Match 2	Match 3	Rank	Semifinals	Final/BM	Rank
Athlete	Event	Opposition Result	Opposition Result	Opposition Result	Rank	Opposition Result	Opposition Result	Rank
Rosa Crean; Gilbert Miles	Pairs	Scotland; L 6 – 16	Australia; L 6 – 24	England; W 12 – 7	3	Did not advance		
David Powell; Kevin Woolmore; Chris Gibson	Triples	England; L 10 – 14	Scotland; L 16 – 8	Malaysia; W 15 – 14	3	Did not advance		

== Netball ==
Pool B

Team	Pld	W	L	PF	PA	PD	Pts	Qualification
Australia	5	5	0	322	185	+137	10	Semi-finals
England	5	4	1	293	160	+133	8	Semi-finals
South Africa	5	3	2	249	222	+27	6	
Wales	5	2	3	199	255	−56	4	
Trinidad and Tobago	5	1	4	167	282	−115	2	
Barbados	5	0	5	162	288	−126	0	

Source: glasgow2014.com

24 July 2014
13:30

Report
Australia
63 – 36
Wales

SECC Precinct
Umpires:
Ian Fuller (ENG)
Terrence Peart (JAM)
Reserve umpire:
Marie-Louw Van Der Merve (RSA)
Bassett 24/28 (86%)
Caldwell 12/15 (80%)
Medhurst 8/11 (73%)
Thwaits 19/23 (83%)

James 8/11 (73%)
Lewis 24/35 (69%)
Moseley 4/7 (57%)

25 July 2014
11:30

Report
England
65 – 25
Wales

SECC Precinct
Umpires:
Marie-Louw Van Der Merve (RSA)
Joshua Bowring (AUS)
Reserve umpire:
Michelle Phippard (AUS)
Corbin 7/10 (70%)
Dunn 20/22 (91%)
Harten 33/43 (77%)
Housby 5/9 (56%)

James 11/16 (69%)
Lewis 5/10 (50%)
Moseley 9/15 (60%)
Thomas 0/4 (0%)

26 July 2014
19:00

Report
Wales
56 – 31
Trinidad and Tobago

SECC Precinct
Umpires:
Tracy Smith (ENG)
Clare McCabe (AUS)
Reserve umpire:
Ian Fuller (ENG)
James 12/19 (63%)
Lewis 31/40 (78%)
Moseley 7/9 (78%)

Barker 1/2 (50%)
Cooper 5/7 (71%)
McCollin 13/15 (87%)
Wilson 12/19 (63%)

28 July 2014
09:30

Report
Wales
47 – 35
Barbados

SECC Precinct
Umpires:
Sharon Kelly (AUS)
Gary Burgess (ENG)
Reserve umpire:
Marie-Louw Van Der Merve (RSA)
James 7/10 (70%)
Lewis 21/30 (70%)
Moseley 19/29 (66%)

Browne 21/27 (78%)
Thomas 14/20 (70%)

29 July 2014
17:00

Report
South Africa
61 – 41
Wales

SECC Precinct
Umpires:
Sharon Kelly (AUS)
Ian Fuller (ENG)
Reserve umpire:
Tracy Smith (ENG)
Holtzhausen 5/8 (63%)
Myburgh 8/13 (62%)
Potgieter 48/54 (89%)

James 16/24 (67%)
Lewis 16/24 (67%)
Moseley 3/5 (60%)
Thomas 6/7 (86%)

== Rugby Sevens ==
- Adam Thomas
- Craig Price
- Iolo Evans
- James Davies
- Jevon Groves
- Luke Treharne
- Lee Williams
- Gareth Davies
- Will Harries
- Gareth Owen
- Luke Morgan
- Alex Webber

Pool stage

Team	Pld	W	D	L	PF	PA	PD	Pts	Qualification
Samoa	3	3	0	0	106	26	+80	9	Medal competition
Wales	3	2	0	1	93	26	+67	7	Medal competition
Papua New Guinea	3	1	0	2	57	69	−12	5	Bowl competition
Malaysia	3	0	0	3	7	142	−135	3	Bowl competition

26 July 2014
12:00

Wales	52–0	Malaysia
	Report

Ibrox Stadium, Glasgow

26 July 2014
18:46

Wales	29–7	Papua New Guinea
	Report

Ibrox Stadium, Glasgow

26 July 2014
21:26

Samoa	19–12	Wales
	Report

Ibrox Stadium, Glasgow

Quarter-finals

27 July 2014
12:28

Australia	21–19	Wales
	Report

Ibrox Stadium, Glasgow

== Shooting ==
=== Clay Target ===
Men

Athlete	Event	Qualification		Semifinals		Final/BM	
Athlete	Event	Points	Rank	Points	Rank	Points	Rank
Malcolm Allen	Skeet	119	5 Q	11	5	Did not advance	
Rhys Price	Skeet	114	10	Did not advance			
Jonathan Davies	Trap	104	19	Did not advance			
Mike Wixey	Trap	110	7=	Did not advance			

Women

Athlete	Event	Qualification		Semifinals		Final/BM	
Athlete	Event	Points	Rank	Points	Rank	Points	Rank
Elena Allen	Skeet	68	3 Q	13(2)	2 QG	13	2nd place, silver medalist(s)
Katie Cowell	Double trap	—N/a				53	15
Sarah Wixey	Double trap	—N/a				63	11

=== Pistol ===
Women

Athlete	Event	Qualification		Semifinals		Final	
Athlete	Event	Points	Rank	Points	Rank	Points	Rank
Shawnee Bourner	10 metre air pistol	362	20	—N/a		Did not advance	
Coral Kennerley	10 metre air pistol	375	7 Q	—N/a		115.3	6

=== Small Bore and Air Rifle ===
Men

Athlete	Event	Qualification		Final	
Athlete	Event	Points	Rank	Points	Rank
Mike Bamsey	10 m air rifle	617.7	6 Q	98.2	7
Mike Bamsey	50 m rifle prone	612.9	19	did not advance	
David Phelps	50 m rifle prone	615.5	12	did not advance	
Mike Bamsey	50 m rifle 3 positions	1137	9	Did not advance	

Women

Athlete	Event	Qualification		Final	
Athlete	Event	Points	Rank	Points	Rank
Jenny Corish	10 m air rifle	411.4	8 Q	79.1	8
Sian Corish	10 m air rifle	406.4	17	Did not advance	
Jenny Corish	50 m rifle prone	—N/a		612.3	12
Sian Corish	50 m rifle prone	—N/a		614.4	8
Jenny Corish	50 m rifle 3 positions	564	12	Did not advance	
Sian Corish	50 m rifle 3 positions	561	14	Did not advance	

=== Full Bore ===
Athlete	Event	Stage 1		Stage 2		Stage 3		Total	
Athlete	Event	Points	Rank	Points	Rank	Points	Rank	Points	Rank
Gareth Morris	Individual	102 – 9v		150 – 20v		135 – 7v		387 – 31v	14
Chris Watson	Individual	102 – 9v		150 – 20v		135 – 7v		387 – 36v	13
Gareth Morris; Chris Watson	Pairs	298 – 33v		286 – 27v		—N/a		584-60v	7

== Squash ==
Individual

Athlete	Event	Round of 128	Round of 64	Round of 32	Round of 16	Quarterfinals	Semifinals	Final	
Athlete	Event	Opposition Score	Opposition Score	Opposition Score	Opposition Score	Opposition Score	Opposition Score	Opposition Score	Rank
Peter Creed	Men's singles	I Rukunya (UGA); W 3 – 0	MN Adan (MAS); L 0 – 3	Did not advance					
Scott Fitzgerald	Men's singles	B Hindle (MLT); L 0 – 3	Did not advance						
Joel Makin	Men's singles	A Arjoon (GUY); W 3 – 0	S Finitsis (AUS); L 0 – 3	Did not advance					
Tesni Evans	Women's singles	—N/a	Bye	K Sample (TRI); W 3 – 0	LW Wern (MAS); L 1 – 3	Did not advance			
Deon Saffery	Women's singles	—N/a	K Cauchi (MLT); W 3 – 0	J Chinappa (IND); L 1 – 3	Did not advance				

Doubles

Athlete	Event	Group stage				Round of 16	Quarterfinals	Semifinals	Final	
Athlete	Event	Opposition Score	Opposition Score	Opposition Score	Rank	Opposition Score	Opposition Score	Opposition Score	Opposition Score	Rank
Peter Creed; David Evans	Men's doubles	Kawooya / Kadoma (UGA); W 2 – 0	Ghosal / Sandhu (IND); W 2 – 0	Blair / Jervis (CAY); W 2 – 0	1 Q	Yeun / Bong (MAS); W 2 – 0	Matthew / Grant (ENG); L 0 – 2	Did not advance		
David Haley; Scott Fitzgerald	Men's doubles	Clyne / Leitch (SCO); L 0 – 2	Ramasra / Wilson (TRI); W 2 – 0	—N/a	2 Q	Coll / Beddoes (NZL); L 2 – 0	Did not advance			
Tesni Evans; Deon Saffery	Women's doubles	Knaggs / Sample (TRI); W 2 – 0	Duncalf / Massaro (ENG); L 0 – 2	Webb / Vai (PNG); W 2 – 0	2 Q	—N/a	Grinham / Brown (AUS); L 0 – 2	Did not advance		
Deon Saffery; David Evans	Mixed doubles	Florens / Koenig (MRI); W 2 – 0	Kippax / Selby (ENG); L 1 – 2	Sample / Ramasra (TRI); W 2 – 0	2 Q	Pallikal / Ghosal (IND); L 0 – 2	Did not advance			
Tesni Evans; Peter Creed	Mixed doubles	Sultana / Hindle (MLT); W 2 – 0	Waters / Barker (ENG); L 1 – 2	Knaggs / Wilson (TRI); W 2 – 0	2 Q	Grinham / Palmer (AUS); L 0 – 2	Did not advance			

== Swimming ==
Men

Athlete	Events	Heat		Semifinal		Final	
Athlete	Events	Time	Rank	Time	Rank	Time	Rank
Otto Putland	50 m freestyle	23.81	=22	—N/a		Did not advance	
Calum Jarvis	100 m freestyle	50.05	8 Q	50.09	10	Did not advance	
Ieuan Lloyd	100 m freestyle	Did not start		Did not advance			
Otto Putland	100 m freestyle	50.66	13 Q	50.61	15	Did not advance	
Calum Jarvis	200 m freestyle	1:47.10	3 Q	—N/a		1:46.53	3rd place, bronze medalist(s)
Ieuan Lloyd	200 m freestyle	1:48.98	=8^{[a]}	—N/a		Did not advance	
Otto Putland	200 m freestyle	1.52:06	21	—N/a		Did not advance	
Jack Thomas	200 m freestyle – S14	2:02.14	4 Q	—N/a		2:01.27	3rd place, bronze medalist(s)
Daniel Jervis	400 m freestyle	3:52.44	10	—N/a		Did not advance	
Ieuan Lloyd	400 m freestyle	3:53.55	13	—N/a		Did not advance	
Daniel Jervis	1500 m freestyle	15:06.60	3 Q	—N/a		14:55.33	3rd place, bronze medalist(s)
Marco Loughran	50 m backstroke	25.37	4 Q	25.12	3 Q	25.36	6
Marco Loughran	100 m backstroke	54.96	8 Q	55.09	10	Did not advance	
Xavier Mohammed	100 m backstroke	55.67	11 Q	55.26	11	Did not advance	
Otto Putland	100 m backstroke	57:31	14 Q	56.83	15	Did not advance	
Xavier Mohammed	200 m backstroke	2:01.04	8 Q	—N/a		1:59.65	8
Robert Holderness	50 m breaststroke	27.93	8 Q	28.26	10	Did not advance	
Robert Holderness	100 m breaststroke	1:01.52	9 Q	1:00.71	7 Q	DSQ	
Robert Holderness	200 m breaststroke	2:11.70	7 Q	—N/a		2:12.35	7
Tom Laxton	50 m butterfly	24.28	11 Q	24.31	12	Did not advance	
Tom Laxton	100 m butterfly	53.45	7 Q	53.14	9	Did not advance	
Ieuan Lloyd	200 m individual medley	2:00.73	6 Q	—N/a		2:00.44	7
Xavier Mohammed	200 m individual medley	2:01.47	11	—N/a		Did not advance	
Thomas Haffield	400 m individual medley	4:19.23	9	—N/a		Did not advance	
Xavier Mohammed	400 m individual medley	Did not start		—N/a		Did not advance	
Calum Jarvis; Ieuan Lloyd; Xavier Mohammed; Otto Putland	4 × 100 m freestyle relay	3:22.95	8 Q	—N/a		3:19.82	6
Calum Jarvis; Daniel Jervis*; Ieuan Lloyd; Xavier Mohammed; Otto Putland	4 × 200 m freestyle relay	7:25.00	3 Q	—N/a		7:15.96	6
Robert Holderness; Calum Jarvis; Tom Laxton; Marco Loughran; Otto Putland*	4 × 100 m medley relay	3:41.58	6 Q	—N/a		3:37.25	6

^{a} Ieuan Lloyd finished in equal eighth position in the heats alongside England's Nick Grainger and Ryan Cochrane from Canada. A swim-off was held between the three competitors which Grainger won and was awarded with the eighth and last qualification place in to the final.

Women

Athlete	Event	Heat		Semifinal		Final	
Athlete	Event	Time	Rank	Time	Rank	Time	Rank
Mari Davies	50 m freestyle	27.25	7	Did not advance			
Hannah McCarthy	50 m freestyle	26.12	16 Q	25.97	15	Did not advance	
Mari Davies	100 m freestyle	58.15	21	Did not advance			
Hannah McCarthy	100 m freestyle	56.53	=13 Q	56.13	13	Did not advance	
Sian Morgan	100 m freestyle	57.76	18	Did not advance			
Jazmin Carlin	200 m freestyle	1:57.61	4 Q	—N/a		1:57.26	6
Ellena Jones	200 m freestyle	2:00.12	15	—N/a		Did not advance	
Rachel Williams	200 m freestyle	2:01.84	17	—N/a		Did not advance	
Jazmin Carlin	400 m freestyle	4:09.76	6 Q	—N/a		4:05.16	2nd place, silver medalist(s)
Ellena Jones	400 m freestyle	4:12.06	10	—N/a		Did not advance	
Jazmin Carlin	800 m freestyle	8:22.69	1 Q	—N/a		8:18.11	1st place, gold medalist(s)
Ellena Jones	800 m freestyle	8:37.64	9	—N/a		Did not advance	
Georgia Davies	50 m backstroke	27.90 GR	1 Q	27.61 GR	1 Q	27.56 GR	1st place, gold medalist(s)
Georgia Davies	100 m backstroke	1:00.86	7 Q	59.63	2 Q	59.58	2nd place, silver medalist(s)
Danielle Stirrat	100 m backstroke	1:04.76	14 Q	1:04.86	14	Did not advance	
Rachel Williams	100 m backstroke	1:02.98	12 Q	1:02.48	12	Did not advance	
Danielle Stirrat	200 m backstroke	2:21.20	11	—N/a		Did not advance	
Rachel Williams	200 m backstroke	2:16.53	10	—N/a		Did not advance	
Bethan Sloan	50 m breaststroke	33.22	14 Q	33.87	16	Did not advance	
Bethan Sloan	100 m breaststroke	1:12.22	19	Did not advance			
Chloe Tutton	100 m breaststroke	1:10.11	11 Q	1:09.38	11	Did not advance	
Bethan Sloan	200 m breaststroke	2:36.98	15	—N/a		Did not advance	
Chloe Tutton	200 m breaststroke	2:29.44	10	—N/a		Did not advance	
Alys Thomas	50 m butterfly	27.14	14 Q	27.03	12	Did not advance	
Jemma Lowe	100 m butterfly	58.61	4 Q	58.47	5 Q	58.63	6
Alys Thomas	100 m butterfly	59.01	8 Q	59.52	9	Did not advance	
Jemma Lowe	200 m butterfly	2:09.28	2 Q	—N/a		2:08.69	5
Alys Thomas	200 m butterfly	2:11.03	6 Q	—N/a		2:08.62	4
Rachel Williams	200 m individual medley	2:17.70	13	—N/a		Did not advance	
Mari Davies; Hannah McCarthy; Sian Morgan; Danielle Stirrat*; Chloe Tutton	4 × 100 m freestyle relay	3:49.46	6 Q	—N/a		3:45.40	6
Mari Davies*; Ellena Jones; Sian Morgan; Danielle Stirrat; Rachel Williams	4 × 200 m freestyle relay	8:13.57	6 Q	—N/a		DSQ	
Georgia Davies; Jemma Lowe; Hannah McCarthy; Alys Thomas*; Chloe Tutton; Rachel Williams*	4 × 100 m medley relay	4:09.76	5 Q	—N/a		DSQ	

* – Indicates athlete swam in the preliminaries but not in the final race.

== Table tennis ==
Singles

Athletes	Event	Preliminary round			First round	Second round	Third round	Quarterfinal	Semifinal	Final	Rank
Athletes	Event	Opposition Score	Opposition Score	Rank	Opposition Score	Opposition Score	Opposition Score	Opposition Score	Opposition Score	Opposition Score	Rank
Ryan Jenkins	Men's	Bye				Howieson (MAS); W 4 – 0	Drinkhall (ENG); L 0 – 4	Did not advance			
Stephen Jenkins	Men's	Hara (MAW); W 4 – 1	Ng'andu (ZAM); W 4 – 0	1 Q	Humphreys (TRI); W 4 – 1	Aruna (NGR); L 0 – 4	Did not advance				
Daniel O'Connell	Men's	Wilson (TRI); W 4 – 0	Khirshid (PAK); W 4 – 0	1 Q	Thériault (CAN); L 0 – 4	Did not advance					
Charlotte Carey	Women's	Cummings (GUY); W 4 – 0	Shah (KEN); W 4 – 0	1 – Q	Bye	Dederko (AUS); L 1 – 4	Did not advance				
Megan Phillips	Women's	Dover (DMA); W 4 – 0	Benstrong (SEY); W 4 – 1	1 Q	Edghill (GUY); W 4 – 3	Lin (SIN); L 1 – 4	Did not advance				
Naomi Owen	Women's	Bye				Chung (TRI); W 4 – 1	Drinkhall (TRI); W 4 – 1	Lay (AUS); L 3 – 4	Did not advance		

Doubles

Athletes	Event	Preliminary round			First round	Second round	Third round	Quarterfinal	Semifinal	Final	Rank
Athletes	Event	Opposition Score	Opposition Score	Rank	Opposition Score	Opposition Score	Opposition Score	Opposition Score	Opposition Score	Opposition Score	Rank
Ryan Jenkins; Stephen Jenkins	Men's	—N/a			Bye	Otieno / Ringui (KEN); W 3 – 0	Kamal / Amalraj (IND); L 0 – 3	Did not advance			
Daniel O'Connell; Conor Edwards	Men's	—N/a			Freddy / Tetabo (KIR); W 3 – 0	Rizal / Ibrahim (MAL); L 1 – 3	Did not advance				
Naomi Owen; Charlotte Carey	Women's	—N/a			Bye	Sinon / Benstrong (SEY); W 3 – 0	Feng / Yu (SIN); L 0 – 3	Did not advance			
Angharad Phillips; Chloe Thomas	Women's	—N/a			Bye	Hung / Yang (NZL); W 3 – 0	Lin / Zhou (SIN); L 0 – 3	Did not advance			
Naomi Owen; Stephen Jenkins	Mixed	—N/a			Bye	McCreery / Lynch-Dawson (NIR); W 3 – 0	Gao / Lin (SIN); L 1 – 3	Did not advance			
Charlotte Carey; Ryan Jenkins	Mixed	—N/a			Bye	Akayade / Baah-Danso (GHA); W 3 – 0	Pitchford / Ho (ENG); L 0 – 3	Did not advance			
Chloe Thomas; Daniel O'Connell	Mixed	—N/a			Sun / Jackson (NZL); L 1 – 3	Did not advance					
Angharad Phillips; Conor Edwards	Mixed	—N/a			Humphreys / Quashie (TRI); W 3 – 2	Thériault / Guo (CAN); W 3 – 0	Powell / Lay (AUS); L 0 – 3	Did not advance			

Team

Athlete	Event	Preliminary round				Round of 32	Round of 16	Quarterfinals	Semifinals	Final / BM	Rank
Athlete	Event	Match 1	Match 2	Match 3	Rank	Round of 32	Round of 16	Quarterfinals	Semifinals	Final / BM	Rank
Athlete	Event	Opposition Result	Opposition Result	Opposition Result	Rank	Opposition Result	Opposition Result	Opposition Result	Opposition Result	Opposition Result	Rank
Conor Edwards; Ryan Jenkins; Stephen Jenkins; Daniel O'Connell	Men's	Kenya; W 3 – 0	New Zealand; W 3 – 2	Papua New Guinea; W 3 – 0	1 Q	—N/a	Mauritius; W 3 – 0	England; W 0 – 3	Did not advance		
Angharad Phillips; Charlotte Carey; Naomi Owen; Megan Phillips; Chloe Thomas	Women's	Vanuatu; W 3 – 0	New Zealand; L 2 – 3	Mauritius; W 3 – 0	2 Q	—N/a	Sri Lanka; W 3 – 0	Australia; L 0 – 3	Did not advance		

== Triathlon ==
Mixed Relay

Athletes	Event	Total Times per Athlete (Swim 250 m, Bike 6 km, Run 1.6 km)	Total Group Time	Rank
Carol Bridge; Liam Lloyd; Holly Lawrence; Morgan Davies	Mixed relay	20:21; 18:37; 19:54; 19:01	1:17:53	8

== Weightlifting ==
Men

Athlete	Event	Weight lifted		Total	Rank
Athlete	Event	Snatch	Clean & jerk	Total	Rank
Gareth Evans	62 kg	118 kg	150 kg	268 kg	5
Darius Jokarzadeh	+105 kg	165 kg	196 kg	361 kg	4

Women

Athlete	Event	Weight lifted		Total	Rank
Athlete	Event	Snatch	Clean & jerk	Total	Rank
Christie Williams	58 kg	65 kg	80 kg	145 kg	13
Michaela Breeze	58 kg	93 kg	109 kg	202 kg	3rd place, bronze medalist(s)
Stephanie Owens	63 kg	67 kg	87 kg	154 kg	13
Natasha Perdue	69 kg	DNF			

== Wrestling ==
=== Freestyle ===
Men

Athlete	Event	Round of 32	Round of 16	Quarterfinal	Semifinal	Bronze final	Final	
Athlete	Event	Opposition Result	Opposition Result	Opposition Result	Opposition Result	Opposition Result	Opposition Result	Rank
Craig Pilling	57 kg	—N/a	Bye	McFarlane (SCO); W 4 – 0	Welson (NGR); L 0 – 4	Tafail (ENG); W 3 – 1	Did not advance	3rd place, bronze medalist(s)
Damion Arzu	61 kg	—N/a	Thongsinh (NZL); L 1 – 4	did not advance				
Thomas Hawthorn	74 kg	—N/a	Bye	Ray (BAN); W 11 – 0	Bibo (NGR); L 0 – 12	did not advance		
Oliver Cole	86 kg	—N/a	Hietbrink (RSA); L 0 – 11	did not advance				

Women

Athlete	Event	Round of 16	Quarterfinal	Semifinal	Repechage	Final	
Athlete	Event	Opposition Result	Opposition Result	Opposition Result	Opposition Result	Opposition Result	Rank
Sarah Connolly	63 kg	—N/a	Kelly (AUS); W 10 – 0	Jakhar (IND); L 2 – 13	Epanga (CMR); L 0 – 11	Did not advance	
