= Gymnastics at the 2014 Commonwealth Games – Women's rhythmic individual hoop =

Women's rhythmic individual hoop at the 2014 Commonwealth Games
- Venue: Scottish Exhibition and Conference Centre
- Dates: 26 July
- Competitors: 8 from 5 nations
- Winning score: 14.800

Medalists
gold medal	Patricia Bezzoubenko	Canada
silver medal	Francesca Jones	Wales
bronze medal	Wong Poh San	Malaysia

The women's rhythmic individual hoop gymnastics competition at the 2014 Commonwealth Games in Glasgow, Scotland was held on 26 July at the Scottish Exhibition and Conference Centre.

== Final ==
Results:

Place	Name	Hoop (rhythmic gymnastics)
1st place, gold medalist(s)	Patricia Bezzoubenko (CAN)	14.800
2nd place, silver medalist(s)	Francesca Jones (WAL)	14.750
3rd place, bronze medalist(s)	Wong Poh San (MAS)	14.650
4	Pantelitsa Theodoulou (CYP)	14.500
5	Laura Halford (WAL)	14.250
6	Amy Dict Weng Kwan (MAS)	14.200
7	Stephani Sherlock (ENG)	13.875
8	Themida Christodoulidou (CYP)	13.250
