= Gymnastics at the 2014 Commonwealth Games – Women's rhythmic individual ribbon =

Women's rhythmic individual ribbon at the 2014 Commonwealth Games
- Venue: Scottish Exhibition and Conference Centre
- Dates: 26 July
- Competitors: 8 from 5 nations
- Winning score: 14.500

Medalists
gold medal	Francesca Jones	Wales
silver medal	Wong Poh San	Malaysia
bronze medal	Patricia Bezzoubenko	Canada

The women's rhythmic individual ribbon gymnastics competition at the 2014 Commonwealth Games in Glasgow, Scotland was held on 26 July at the Scottish Exhibition and Conference Centre.

== Final ==
Results:

Place	Name	Ribbon (rhythmic gymnastics)
1st place, gold medalist(s)	Francesca Jones (WAL)	14.500
2nd place, silver medalist(s)	Wong Poh San (MAS)	14.250
3rd place, bronze medalist(s)	Patricia Bezzoubenko (CAN)	13.800
4	Amy Dict Weng Kwan (MAS)	13.600
5	Lynne Hutchison (ENG)	13.550
6	Maria Kitkarska (CAN)	13.375
7	Grace Legote (RSA)	13.100
8	Laura Halford (WAL)	12.850
