= Francesca Jones =

Francesca Jones may refer to:

- Frankie Jones (gymnast) (born 1990), Welsh rhythmic gymnast
- Francesca Jones (tennis) (born 2000), British tennis player
