= Nicholas Rees (field hockey) =

Welsh field hockey player (born 1989)

Nick Rees
Personal information
- Born: 8 February 1989 (age 37) Swansea, Wales

Sport
- Sport: Field hockey
- Position: Forward
Senior career
Years	Team	Caps	Goals
2006–2013	Swansea	-	-
2009–2013	Birmingham Univ	-	-
2013–2014	Exeter Univ	-	-
2011–2014	Whitchurch	-	-
National team
Years	Team	Caps	Goals
–	Wales		-

Nicholas Rees (born 8 February 1989) is a former field hockey player who represented Wales. He competed for Wales at the 2014 Commonwealth Games.

== Biography ==
Rees, born in Swansea, Wales, played for Swansea Hockey Club.

Rees played for both the University of Exeter Hockey Club and the University of Birmingham Hockey Club, while also playing club hockey for Whitchurch Hockey Club.

In 2014, Rees was selected to represent the Welsh team at the 2014 Commonwealth Games in Glasgow, Scotland in the men's tournament.
