= Cyprus at the 2014 Commonwealth Games =

- CGF code: CYP
- CGA: Cyprus Olympic Committee
- Website: olympic.org.cy (in Greek and English)

in Glasgow, Scotland
- Competitors: 51 in 7 sports
- Flag bearer: Georgios Achilleos
- Medals Ranked 14th: Gold 2 Silver 4 Bronze 2 Total 8

Commonwealth Games appearances (overview)
- 1978; 1982; 1986; 1990; 1994; 1998; 2002; 2006; 2010; 2014; 2018; 2022; 2026; 2030

Cyprus competed in the 2014 Commonwealth Games in Glasgow, Scotland from July 23 to August 3, 2014.

== Athletics ==
Men

Athlete	Event	Round 1		Semifinal		Final	
Athlete	Event	Result	Rank	Result	Rank	Result	Rank
Milan Trajkovic	110 metres hurdles	13.95	5	—		Did not advance	

Field Events

Athlete	Event	Qualification		Final	
Athlete	Event	Distance	Rank	Distance	Rank
Kyriakos Ioannou	High jump	2.20 =SB	=7 Q	2.28 SB	2nd place, silver medalist(s)
Vasilios Konstantinou	High jump	2.11	17	Did not advance	
Nikandros Stylianou	Pole vault	—		5.35	=5
Orestis Antoniades	Discus throw	57.91	10 q	54.47	11
Apostolos Parellis	Discus throw	61.91	4 q	63.32	2nd place, silver medalist(s)
Michael Kolokotronis	Hammer throw	63.68	15	Did not advance	
Alexandros Poursanidis	Hammer throw	65.25	12 q	65.66	10
Constantinos Stathelakos	Hammer throw	66.17	10 q	68.22	7

Women

Athlete	Event	Round 1		Semifinal		Final	
Athlete	Event	Result	Rank	Result	Rank	Result	Rank
Anna Ramona Papaioannou	100 m	11.67	3 Q	11.61	6	Did not advance	
Anna Ramona Papaioannou	200 m	23.61	4 q	23.87	4	Did not advance	
Natalia Evangelidou	800 m	2.05.95	5	Did not advance			
Natalia Evangelidou	1500 metres	4:16.05 PB	8	—		Did not advance	

Field events

Athlete	Event	Qualification		Final	
Athlete	Event	Distance	Position	Distance	Position
Leontia Kallenou	High jump	1.85	=1 Q	1.89	=4
Eleftheria Christofi	Long jump	5.87	22	Did not advance	
Nektaria Panayi	Long jump	6.36	7 q	6.33	7
Eleftheria Christofi	Triple jump	12.84	14	Did not advance	
Androniki Lada	Discus throw	49.78	13	Did not advance	
Paraskevi Theodorou	Hammer throw	57.00	14	Did not advance	

== Cycling ==
=== Mountain biking ===
Athlete	Event	Time	Rank
Christos Loizou	Men's cross-country	LAP	20

=== Road ===
Women

Athlete	Event	Time	Rank
Antri Christoforou	Road race	DNF	
Antri Christoforou	Time trial	46:53.93	17

== Gymnastics ==
=== Artistic ===
Men

Athlete	Event	Final							
Athlete	Event	Apparatus						Total	Rank
Athlete	Event	F	PH	R	V	PB	HB	Total	Rank
Panagiotis Aristotelous	Team	13.200	11.566	13.300	13.566	11.833	13.533	—	
Irodotos Georgallas	Team			13.733				—	
Dimitris Krasis	Team				13.266	13.566	13.700	—	
Stefanos Loucaides	Team	12.933	11.000	12.700	13.316	13.258	12.900	—	
Xenios Papaevripidou	Team	12.533	12.366	12.266	13.233	12.733	13.600	—	
Total	Team	38.666	34.932	39.733	40.148	39.557	40.833	233.869	8

Individual all around final

Athlete	Event	Final							
Athlete	Event	Apparatus						Total	Rank
Athlete	Event	F	PH	R	V	PB	HB	Total	Rank
Panagiotis Aristotelous	Individual	12.700	12.066	13.566	13.858	12.933	12.300	77.423	15
Stefanos Loucaides	Individual	12.833	11.433	12.966	13.166	13.566	12.733	76.697	19
Xenios Papaevripidou	Individual	13.166	11.366	10.975	13.383	13.700	13.466	76.056	21

Women

Athlete	Event	Qualification						Final					
Athlete	Event	Apparatus				Total	Rank	Apparatus				Total	Rank
Athlete	Event	V	UB	BB	F	Total	Rank	V	UB	BB	F	Total	Rank
Stelutsa Savvidou	Individual	12.800	10.458	11.333	12.000	46.591	24	13.733	8.600	10.933	12.366	45.632	24

=== Rhythmic ===
Individual

Athlete	Event	Qualification						Final					
Athlete	Event	Hoop	Ball	Clubs	Ribbon	Total	Rank	Hoop	Ball	Clubs	Ribbon	Total	Rank
Pantelitsa Theodoulou	Individual	14.500	13.800	14.375	13.050	55.725	4 Q	14.250	13.725	14.300	12.825	55.100	5
Themida Christodoulidou	Individual	14.100	14.075	14.550	13.300	56.025	3 Q	13.325	14.050	13.075	12.775	53.225	7

Individual finals

Athlete	Event	Total	Rank
Themida Christodoulidou	Ball	14.050	4
Themida Christodoulidou	Clubs	14.300	3rd place, bronze medalist(s)
Themida Christodoulidou	Hoop	13.250	8
Pantelitsa Theodoulou	Ball	13.600	6
Pantelitsa Theodoulou	Clubs	14.150	4
Pantelitsa Theodoulou	Hoop	14.500	4

== Judo ==
Men

Athlete	Event	Round of 32	Round of 16	Quarterfinals	Semifinals	Repechage	Final / BM	
Athlete	Event	Opposition Result	Opposition Result	Opposition Result	Opposition Result	Opposition Result	Opposition Result	Rank
Trikomitis	−60 kg	—	Dodge (WAL); L 0000-1011	Did not advance				
Andreas Krassas	−66 kg	Amoako (GHA); W 0001-0003	Brown (AUS); W 0102-0004	Punza (ZAM); W 1002-0003	Mabulu (RSA); W 0013-0003	—	Oates (ENG); L 0002-1010	2nd place, silver medalist(s)
Robert Nicola	−81 kg	Bye	Omondi (KEN); W 1100-0000	Reed (ENG); L 0000-1000	Did not advance	Brewer (NZL); W 0001-1000	Burt (CAN); L 1000–0001	5

== Shooting ==
=== Men ===
Shotgun

Athlete	Event	Qualification		Semifinals		Final/BM	
Athlete	Event	Points	Rank	Points	Rank	Points	Rank
Yannis Ailiotis	Trap	115	5 Q	12 (2)	5	Did not advance	
Marios Sofocleous	Trap	111	7	Did not advance			
Georgios Achilleos	Skeet	122	1 Q	14	1 QG	14	1st place, gold medalist(s)
Andreas Chasikos	Skeet	120	3 Q	12	4 QB	13	4

=== Women ===
Pistol

Athlete	Event	Qualification		Final	
Athlete	Event	Points	Rank	Points	Rank
Irene Panteli	10 metre air pistol	336	26	Did not advance	
Marilena Constantinou	10 m air rifle	410.7	11	Did not advance	
Fanoula Theofanous	10 m air rifle	387.2	26	Did not advance	

Shotgun

Athlete	Event	Qualification		Semifinals		Final/BM	
Athlete	Event	Points	Rank	Points	Rank	Points	Rank
Georgia Konstantinidou	Trap	69	2 Q	12	2 QG	12	2nd place, silver medalist(s)
Panagiota Andreou	Skeet	65	8	Did not advance			
Andri Eleftheriou	Skeet	69	2 Q	12(4)	4 QB	13	3rd place, bronze medalist(s)

== Swimming ==
Men

Athlete	Event	Heat		Semifinal		Final	
Athlete	Event	Time	Rank	Time	Rank	Time	Rank
Alexandre Bakhtiarov	100 m freestyle	52.99	29	Did not advance			
Iacovos Hadjiconstantinou	400 m freestyle	4:14.57	25	—		Did not advance	
Iacovos Hadjiconstantinou	1500 m freestyle	16:41:00	18	—		Did not advance	
Alexandre Bakhtiarov	50 m butterfly	25.16	=15 Q	24.95	16	Did not advance	

Women

Athlete	Event	Heat		Semifinal		Final	
Athlete	Event	Time	Rank	Time	Rank	Time	Rank
Margarita Pissaridou	50 m freestyle	27.42	26	Did not advance			
Margarita Pissaridou	100 m freestyle	1:00.74	30	Did not advance			
Irene Chrysostomou	50 m breaststroke	34.68	21	Did not advance			
Irene Chrysostomou	100 m breaststroke	1:15.18	25	Did not advance			
Irene Chrysostomou	200 m breaststroke	2:40.44	20	—		Did not advance	

== Weightlifting ==
Men

Athlete	Event	Snatch	Clean & jerk	Total	Rank
Dimitris Minasidis	62 kg	125	151	276	1st place, gold medalist(s)
Alexandros Amanatidis	77 kg	125	155	280	11

Women

Athlete	Event	Snatch	Clean & jerk	Total	Rank
Alexandra Klatsia	63 kg	71	90	161	12
