= Athletics at the 2014 Commonwealth Games – Men's pole vault =

Men's pole vault at the Commonwealth Games

The Men's pole vault at the 2014 Commonwealth Games as part of the athletics programme was held at Hampden Park on 1 August 2014.

== Records ==
World Record	6.14	Sergey Bubka	UKR	Sestriere, Italy	31 July 1994
Games Record	5.80	Steven Hooker	AUS	Melbourne, Australia	24 March 2006

== Results ==
=== Jump-off ===
Rank	Athlete	5.60	5.55	Result
1st place, gold medalist(s)	Steven Lewis (ENG)	x	o	
2nd place, silver medalist(s)	Luke Cutts (ENG)	x	x	

=== Final ===
Rank	Athlete	4.80	5.00	5.20	5.35	5.45	5.55	5.60	Result	Notes
=1	Steven Lewis (ENG)	-	-	-	o	–	o	xxx	5.55	
=1	Luke Cutts (ENG)	-	o	o	o	o	o	xxx	5.55	
3rd place, bronze medalist(s)	Shawnacy Barber (CAN)	-	–	o	o	o	xxx		5.45	
4	Jax Thoirs (SCO)	-	–	o	o	xo	xxx		5.45	
=5	Nikandros Stylianou (CYP)	-	o	o	xxo	xxx			5.35	
=5	Paul Walker (WAL)	-	o	o	xxo	x–	xx		5.35	=SB
7	Joel Pocklington (AUS)	-	o	xo	xxx				5.20	
8	K'Don Samuels (JAM)	–	o	xxx					5.00	
9	Iskandar Alwi (MAS)	o	xo	xxx					5.00	
10	Rick Valcin (LCA)	xxo	xo	xxx					5.00	
	Matt Boyd (AUS)	xxx							NM	
	Max Eaves (ENG)	–	–	–	xxx				NM	
	Gregor MacLean (SCO)	x–							NM	
