= Wong Poh San =

Malaysian rhythmic gymnast

- Full name: Wong Poh San
- Born: 5 December 1996 (age 29) Johor, Malaysia
- Height: 163 cm (5 ft 4 in)

Gymnastics career
- Discipline: Rhythmic gymnastics
- Country represented: Malaysia
Medal record
Rhythmic gymnastics
Representing Malaysia
Commonwealth Games
Silver medal – second place	2014 Glasgow	Ribbon
Bronze medal – third place	2014 Glasgow	Team
Bronze medal – third place	2014 Glasgow	Hoop

Wong Poh San (born 5 December 1996 in Johor) is a Malaysian former individual rhythmic gymnast. She was part of the Malaysian team that won the bronze medal in the women's rhythmic team event at the 2014 Commonwealth Games, and individually, she won silver in the ribbon final and bronze with hoop.

== Career ==
As a junior, Poh San competed at the 2011 Asian Championships, where she placed 8th in the all-around and won silver with the ribbon and bronze with clubs.

The next year, she competed at the 2012 Gymnastics Olympic Test Event in January. She placed 13th in the all-around. In March, she competed at the 2012 Deriugina Cup, held in Kyiv, as the only Asian entrant, and she won a bronze medal. She was subsequently invited to lunch with the Malaysian ambassador to Ukraine.

Ahead of the 2014 Commonwealth Games, the Malaysian Gymnastics Association sent her and her teammates Amy Kwang and Fatin Zakirah Zain Jalany to Saint Petersburg to train. In July, at the Games, they won the bronze medal. In the individual event finals, she won silver with ribbon and bronze with hoop. Poh San said that she was nervous going up against Patricia Bezzoubenko and Frankie Jones, who she considered to be strong competitors. Although she had intended to compete at the 2014 Asian Games, she had a back injury and was not medically cleared in time to compete.

She took four months off training in early 2015 after a hip injury and returned to the gym in June, having missed the 2015 SEA Games.

In 2017, she competed at the selection event for the 2017 SEA Games, held in her home country of Malaysia, but she performed poorly and was not chosen to compete.
