= Nikara Jenkins =

Welsh gymnast

- Full name: Nikara Jenkins
- Born: Swansea, Wales

Gymnastics career
- Country represented: Wales
Medal record
Representing Wales
Commonwealth Games
Silver medal – second place	2014 Glasgow	Team

Nikara Jenkins (born 1997) is a Welsh rhythmic gymnast who won a silver medal in the Women's rhythmic team all-around event at the 2014 Commonwealth Games in Glasgow.

== Career ==
In May 2014, Jenkins reached the final of the British Rhythmic Championships. Aged 17, Jenkins qualified to compete at the 2014 Commonwealth Games in Glasgow. At the Games, Jenkins, Francesca Jones and Laura Halford won a silver medal in the Women's rhythmic team all-around event. It was Wales' first Commonwealth Games medal in a team event, and Wales' first medal at the 2014 Games.

== Personal life ==
Jenkins is a supporter of Welsh independence.
