= Fatin Zakirah Zain Jalany =

Malaysian rhythmic gymnast

Fatin Zakirah
- Full name: Fatin Zakirah Zain Jalany
- Nickname: Kyra
- Born: 15 March 1997 (age 29) Kelantan, Malaysia
- Height: 161 cm (5 ft 3 in)

Gymnastics career
- Discipline: Rhythmic gymnastics
- Country represented: Malaysia
Medal record
Rhythmic gymnastics
Representing Malaysia
Commonwealth Games
Bronze medal – third place	2014 Glasgow	Team

Fatin Zakirah Zain Jalany (born 15 March 1997, in Kelantan) is a Malaysian rhythmic gymnast. She was part of the Malaysian team that won the bronze medal in the women's rhythmic team all-around event at the 2014 Commonwealth Games.
