= Laura Halford =

British rhythmic gymnast

- Born: 25 February 1996 (age 30) England

Gymnastics career
- Discipline: Rhythmic gymnastics
- Country represented: Great Britain Wales
- Club: Esprit Gymnastics, Swindon
Medal record
Representing Wales
Commonwealth Games
Silver medal – second place	2014 Glasgow	Team
Silver medal – second place	2018 Gold Coast	Hoop
Bronze medal – third place	2014 Glasgow	All-around
Bronze medal – third place	2014 Glasgow	Ball

Laura Halford (born 25 February 1996) is a British rhythmic gymnast from Cricklade, Wiltshire. Halford is a four times senior British champion (2013, 2014, 2015, 2017), and two times junior British champion. She represented Wales at the 2014 Commonwealth Games.

== Early life and education ==
Halford was brought up in Cricklade, Wiltshire. In 2014 she was a student at New College, Swindon, and in 2018 was studying Sport and Exercise Science at Cardiff Metropolitan University.

== Gymnastic career ==
Halford began gymnastics at the age of six, and her natural flexibility saw her gravitate towards rhythmic gymnastics. By the age of nine she was representing both Britain and Wales, qualifying for the latter through her Welsh father. At the age of ten she won her first junior British title. At the age of 12 Halford was recognized by her district council as an aspiring junior sportsperson and was awarded a grant to help fund her sporting career. Halford, who trains out of Wiltshire club, Esprit Gymnastics in Swindon, travels to Cardiff three times a week to train with the Welsh team, where her teammate was British champion Frankie Jones.

In 2011 Halford became British junior champion. In 2012, her first year competing as a senior, in the absence of Frankie Jones, she was favourite to take the British championship held at Fenton Manor Sport Complex. Her overall score of 55.599 was enough to push her teammate Stephani Sherlock into second place and give Halford the title. The same year she also took the Wales national title.

In preparation for the 2014 Commonwealth Games in Glasgow, Scotland, Halford and Wales team-mate Nikara Jenkins travelled to Tartu, Estonia to take part in the Miss Valentine Gymnastic Competition in order to practice their new routines in a competitive setting. Although not placing highly their coach believed the experience was valuable. Halford's build-up to the Commonwealth Games continued through 2013 when she won the invitational senior Millennium Cup in Vancouver, Canada.

In 2014, Halford successfully defended her Welsh title, also taking gold in the individual ball event. A few days later she travelled to Stoke to defend her British championship title. Her score of 61.465 across the ball, hoop, ribbon and clubs saw her retain her crown, which also saw the return of Frankie Jones to the competition. In June 2014 it was announced that Halford had been selected for the Wales team at the 2014 Commonwealth Games. At Glasgow she was entered for four individual events, the ball, hoop, ribbon and all-around; while she was joined by Jones and Jenkins to compete for the team all-around event. On the first day of the Commonwealth Games, in the team all-around event, Wales won silver having led for much of the competition. On day two, she entered the individual all-around, scoring 56.225 to finish third to take bronze, while team-mate Jones finished ahead of her in silver position. In day three Halford came eighth in ribbon, fifth in hoop, but secured a third medal by taking a bronze in the ball. Halford competed at the 2014 World Championships in İzmir, Turkey placing 44th in the all-around qualifications.

In 2015, Halford competed at the 2015 Lisbon World Cup finishing 33rd in the all-around. In August, Halford finished 36th in all-around at the 2015 Sofia World Cup. On 9–13 September, Halford competed at the 2015 World Championships in Stuttgart finishing 73rd in the all-around qualifications and did not advance into the top 24 finals.

In 2016, Halford competed at the 2016 FIG World Cup in Espoo finishing 31st in the all-around. On 17–20 March, Halford competed at the 2016 Lisbon World Cup where she finished 33rd in the all-around. Halford finished 25th in the all-around at the 2016 Sofia World Cup. On 1–3 July, Halford competed at the 2016 Berlin World Cup finishing 24th in the all-around.

On 5–7 May 2017, Halford competed at the 2017 Sofia World Cup and finished 31st in the all-around. On 12–14 May, Halford competed at the 2017 World Challenge Cup in Portimao where she finished 17th in the all-around which was her highest World Cup all-around placement. On 19–21 May, Halford along with teammate Stephani Sherlock represented the individual seniors for Great Britain at the 2017 European Championships. Her next event was at the 2017 World Challenge Cup Guadalajara where she finished 26th in the all-around. She reclaimed the national title at the 2017 British Championships. On 30 August 30 – 3 September, Halford competed at the 2017 World Championships in Pesaro, Italy; finishing 67th in the all-around qualifications and thus not making the top 24 all-around finalists.
