= Themida Christodoulidou =

Cypriot rhythmic gymnast (born 1997)

- Born: 11 December 1997 (age 28)

Gymnastics career
- Discipline: Rhythmic gymnastics
- Country represented: Cyprus, Russia; (2010-2018)
- College team: University of Nicosia
- Club: Melissanides Club
- Head coach: Tatiana Ulanova
- Choreographer: Anna Christodoulidou/ Anthi Kettirou
Medal record
Representing Cyprus
Rhythmic Gymnastics
Commonwealth Games
Bronze medal – third place	2014 Glasgow	Clubs

Themida Christodoulidou (Greek: Θέμιδα Χριστοδουλίδου; born 11 December 1997) is a Cypriot individual rhythmic gymnast. She represents her nation at international competitions. She competed at world championships, including at the 2014 and 2015 World Rhythmic Gymnastics Championships. At the 2014 Commonwealth Games, she won the bronze medal for the clubs.
