= Pantelitsa Theodoulou =

Cypriot rhythmic gymnast (born 1997)

- Full name: Pantelitsa Theodoulou
- Born: 17 July 1997 (age 29) Egkomi, Nicosia District, Cyprus

Gymnastics career
- Discipline: Rhythmic gymnastics
- Country represented: Cyprus (2013-2014 (?))

Pantelitsa Theodoulou (Greek: Παντελίτσα Θεοδούλου) (born 17 July 1997) is a Cypriot individual rhythmic gymnast. She represents her nation at international competitions. She competed at world championships, including at the 2013 World Rhythmic Gymnastics Championships. In 2014, she competed at the 2014 Commonwealth Games, finishing in fourth place in the individual competition.
