= Frankie Jones (gymnast) =

Welsh rhythmic gymnast (born 1990)

- Jones performing with the ribbon at the 2010 Commonwealth Games

Personal information
- Full name: Francesca Victoria R. Jones
- Nickname: Frankie Frankenstein
- Born: 9 November 1990 (age 35) Kettering, Northamptonshire

Gymnastics career
- Discipline: Rhythmic gymnastics
- Country represented: United Kingdom Wales
- Club: City of Birmingham Gymnastics Club
- Retired: 2014
Medal record
Representing Wales
Commonwealth Games
Gold medal – first place	2014 Glasgow	Ribbon
Silver medal – second place	2010 Delhi	Hoop
Silver medal – second place	2014 Glasgow	All-around
Silver medal – second place	2014 Glasgow	Hoop
Silver medal – second place	2014 Glasgow	Ball
Silver medal – second place	2014 Glasgow	Clubs
Silver medal – second place	2014 Glasgow	Team

Francesca Victoria R. Jones (born 9 November 1990) is a retired Welsh rhythmic gymnast who represented Wales at three successive Commonwealth Games from 2006 to 2014 as well as at the 2012 Summer Olympics. At the 2014 Commonwealth Games, Jones won six medals, gold in the ribbon event and five silvers, and the David Dixon Award. She is also a six-time British champion.

== Career ==
Jones began artistic gymnastics when she was six, but when she was nine, her gym closed temporarily, and she went to another local gym that taught rhythmic gymnastics. She trained in both disciplines for several years.

She was selected for the national team at age 13 and went to train in Lilleshall. She did her A levels through distance learning due to her training. From 2006 to 2012, she won six British titles, with her only loss during that time being to Francesca Fox in 2008.

At the 2006 Commonwealth Games, Jones finished 12th overall in the individual all-around competition. Over the next few years, she competed at her first World Championships in 2007, where she placed 86th, and the 2009 World Championships, where she finished 55th in qualifications.

Jones was in a car crash on the way to a competition shortly before the 2010 Commonwealth Games. She was unhurt and again represented Wales in the rhythmic gymnastic individual competition, where she was the only Welsh competitor. There, she finished in 4th place overall and won the silver medal in the hoop final.

At the 2010 World Championships, she placed 52nd, and at the 2011 World Championships, she finished in 70th place.

Jones also represented Great Britain in rhythmic gymnastics as an allocated host entry berth in the 2012 Summer Olympics. One of her routines was choreographed by a principal dancer at the Birmingham Royal Ballet, Matthew Lawrence. She finished in last place amongst 24 gymnasts in the qualification round after dropping her clubs. That year, she also had hip surgery.

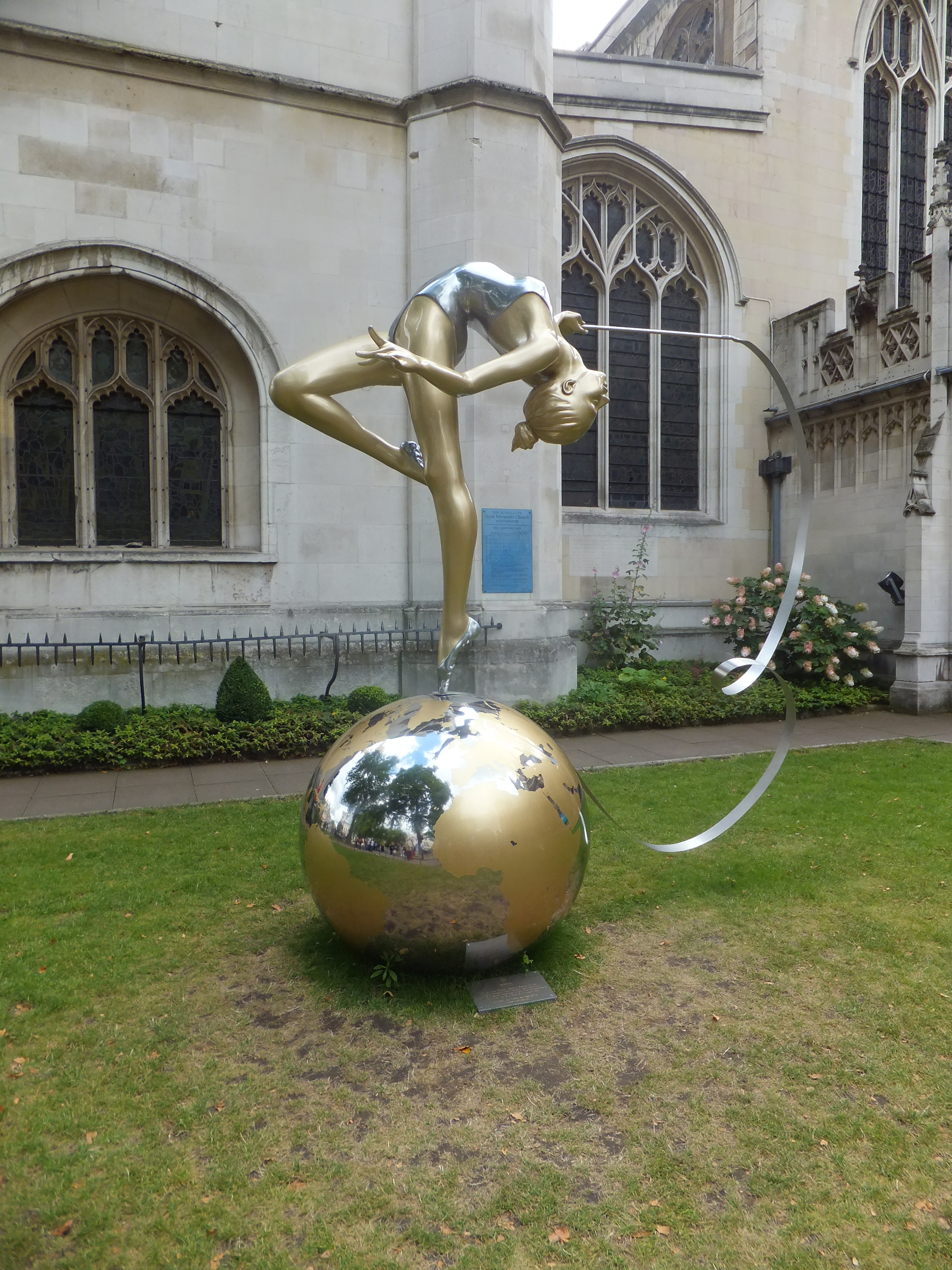
Sculpture of Frankie Jones in the City of Westminster

At the 2014 Commonwealth Games, Jones was the Welsh flag bearer for the opening ceremony. She competed in the team event with her teammates Nikara Jenkins and Laura Halford; it was the first time Wales had competed in the team event, and Jones expressed pride in that fact and named it as a highlight of her career. The team won the silver medal. Jones also won an individual gold in the ribbon final, the first for Wales at that Games, as well as silver in the all-around, hoop, ball, and clubs finals. With six medals, she won the most medals any Welsh athlete had during a single Commonwealth Games. She was also awarded the David Dixon Award.

After the Games, she retired from competitive gymnastics and expressed feeling satisfied with her career, saying, "I'm so happy with my ending." After the Games, there was an uptick in gymnastics enrollment in Wales that was attributed to her success.

Jones became an athlete advisor for the 2018 Commonwealth Games. She enrolled in Cardiff Metropolitan University for a degree in sports condition and rehabilitation.
