= Gymnastics at the 2018 Commonwealth Games =

- (From left to right) Artistic, Rhythmic
- Venue: Coomera Indoor Sports Centre
- Dates: 5–9 April 2018 (artistic); 11–13 April 2018 (rhythmic)
- Nations: 21

Gymnastics at the 2018 Commonwealth Games was the ninth appearance of Gymnastics at the Commonwealth Games. The gymnastics competition was held in the Gold Coast, Australia, from April 5 to 9, 2018 (artistic) and 11 to 13 (rhythmic) at the Coomera Indoor Sports Centre. A total of 14 artistic gymnastics events were held (eight for men and six for women), along with six rhythmic gymnastics events.

== Schedule ==
Q	Qualification	F	Final

Artistic
Date Event	Thu 5	Fri 6	Sat 7	Sun 8	Mon 9
Men's team all-around	F				
Men's individual all-around	Q		F		
Men's floor	Q			F	
Men's pommel horse	Q			F	
Men's rings	Q			F	
Men's vault	Q				F
Men's parallel bars	Q				F
Men's horizontal bar	Q				F
Women's team all-around		F			
Women's individual all-around		Q	F		
Women's vault		Q		F	
Women's uneven bars		Q		F	
Women's balance beam		Q			F
Women's floor		Q			F

Rhythmic
Date Event	Wed 11	Thu 12	Fri 13
Team all-around	F		
Individual all-around	Q	F	
Hoop	Q		F
Ball	Q		F
Clubs	Q		F
Ribbon	Q		F

== Medal table ==
* Host nation (Australia)

Rank	Nation	Gold	Silver	Bronze	Total
1	England	6	7	3	16
2	Cyprus	6	1	2	9
3	Canada	4	6	3	13
4	Australia*	2	2	5	9
5	Malaysia	1	3	3	7
6	Northern Ireland	1	0	0	1
7	Wales	0	2	0	2
8	Scotland	0	0	3	3
Totals (8 entries)		20	21	19	60

== Medal summary ==
=== Artistic ===
==== Men's events ====
Event	Gold	Silver	Bronze
Team all-around	England; Courtney Tulloch; Max Whitlock; James Hall; Nile Wilson; Dominick Cunningham	Canada; Cory Paterson; Jackson Payne; René Cournoyer; Scott Morgan; Zachary Clay	Scotland; Daniel Purvis; Frank Baines; Hamish Carter; Kelvin Cham; David Weir
Individual all-around	Nile Wilson; England	James Hall; England	Marios Georgiou; Cyprus
Floor exercise	Marios Georgiou; Cyprus	Scott Morgan; Canada	Daniel Purvis; Scotland
Pommel horse	Rhys McClenaghan; Northern Ireland	Max Whitlock; England	Zachary Clay; Canada
Rings	Courtney Tulloch; England	Nile Wilson; England	Scott Morgan; Canada
Vault	Christopher Remkes; Australia	Courtney Tulloch; England	Dominick Cunningham; England
Parallel bars	Marios Georgiou; Cyprus	Nile Wilson; England	Frank Baines; Scotland
Horizontal bar	Nile Wilson; England	Cory Paterson; Canada James Hall; England	Not awarded

==== Women's events ====
Event	Gold	Silver	Bronze
Team all-around	Canada; Ellie Black; Shallon Olsen; Isabela Onyshko; Brittany Rogers; Jade Chrobok	England; Georgia-Mae Fenton; Lucy Stanhope; Alice Kinsella; Kelly Simm; Taeja James	Australia; Georgia-Rose Brown; Alexandra Eade; Georgia Godwin; Rianna Mizzen; Emily Whitehead
Individual all-around	Ellie Black; Canada	Georgia Godwin; Australia	Alice Kinsella; England
Vault	Shallon Olsen; Canada	Ellie Black; Canada	Emily Whitehead; Australia
Uneven bars	Georgia-Mae Fenton; England	Brittany Rogers; Canada	Georgia Godwin; Australia
Balance beam	Alice Kinsella; England	Georgia-Rose Brown; Australia	Kelly Simm; England
Floor exercise	Alexandra Eade; Australia	Latalia Bevan; Wales	Shallon Olsen; Canada

=== Rhythmic ===
Event	Gold	Silver	Bronze
Team all-around	Cyprus; Diamanto Evripidou; Eleni Ellina; Viktoria Skittidi	Malaysia; Amy Kwan; Koi Sie Yan; Izzah Amzan	Australia; Enid Sung; Danielle Prince; Alexandra Kiroi-Bogatyreva
Individual all-around	Diamanto Evripidou; Cyprus	Katherine Uchida; Canada	Amy Kwan; Malaysia
Hoop	Diamanto Evripidou; Cyprus	Laura Halford; Wales	Amy Kwan; Malaysia
Ball	Diamanto Evripidou; Cyprus	Koi Sie Yan; Malaysia	Alexandra Kiroi-Bogatyreva; Australia
Clubs	Sophie Crane; Canada	Koi Sie Yan; Malaysia	Diamanto Evripidou; Cyprus
Ribbon	Amy Kwan; Malaysia	Diamanto Evripidou; Cyprus	Koi Sie Yan; Malaysia

== Participating nations ==
=== Artistic ===
There are 21 participating nations in the artistic gymnastics competitions with a total of 98 athletes.

- Australia (10 athletes)
- Canada (10)
- Cayman Islands (2)
- Cyprus (7)
- England (10)
- India (6)
- Isle of Man (1)
- Jamaica (1)
- Jersey (3)
- Malaysia (6)
- Malta (1)
- Namibia (1)
- New Zealand (6)
- Nigeria (1)
- Northern Ireland (2)
- Scotland (10)
- Singapore (5)
- South Africa (2)
- Sri Lanka (3)
- Trinidad and Tobago (1)
- Wales (10)

=== Rhythmic ===
There are 13 participating nations in the rhythmic gymnastics competitions with a total of 26 athletes. Nigeria and Sri Lanka made their Commonwealth Games debut in the sport.

- Australia (3 athletes)
- Canada (3)
- Cyprus (3)
- England (3)
- Gibraltar (1)
- India (1)
- Malaysia (3)
- New Zealand (1)
- Nigeria (1)
- Singapore (1)
- South Africa (2)
- Sri Lanka (1)
- Wales (3)

== See also ==
- Gymnastics at the 2018 Summer Youth Olympics
