= Gymnastics at the 2018 Commonwealth Games – Women's rhythmic individual all-around =

Women's rhythmic individual all-around at the 2018 Commonwealth Games
- Venue: Coomera Indoor Sports Centre
- Dates: 11–12 April 2018
- Competitors: 26 from 13 nations
- Winning score: 55.750

Medalists
gold medal	Diamanto Evripidou	Cyprus
silver medal	Katherine Uchida	Canada
bronze medal	Amy Kwan	Malaysia

The women's rhythmic individual all-around gymnastics competition at the 2018 Commonwealth Games in Gold Coast, Australia was held from 11 to 12 April at the Coomera Indoor Sports Centre.

The team competition on 11 April, was also used as the qualifying competition for the individual-all around. 26 athletes participated with the top 16 advancing to the final. However, only two athletes per nation were allowed to progress.

== Qualification ==
Results:

Place	Name	Hoop (rhythmic gymnastics)	Ball (rhythmic gymnastics)	Clubs (rhythmic gymnastics)	Ribbon (rhythmic gymnastics)	Total	Notes
1	Diamanto Evripidou (CYP)	14.550	14.600	14.375	13.450	56.975	Q
2	Amy Kwan (MAS)	13.400	11.550	12.400	12.650	50.000	Q
3	Koi Sie Yan (MAS)	12.900	12.650	13.250	11.150	49.950	Q
4	Laura Halford (WAL)	13.600	12.800	11.450	11.750	49.600	Q
5	Viktoria Skittidi (CYP)	12.750	11.350	13.900	11.450	49.450	Q
6	Izzah Amzan (MAS)	13.150	13.650	12.350	9.800	48.950	
7	Enid Sung (AUS)	13.450	11.150	12.100	10.750	47.450	Q
8	Alexandra Kiroi-Bogatyreva (AUS)	12.550	12.250	11.450	11.200	47.450	Q
9	Sophie Crane (CAN)	13.800	9.900	12.900	10.600	47.200	Q
10	Danielle Prince (AUS)	13.100	12.150	11.400	10.550	47.200	
11	Eleni Ellina (CYP)	12.100	11.650	11.700	11.550	47.000	
12	Katherine Uchida (CAN)	13.200	11.050	11.950	10.600	46.800	Q
13	Carmen Whelan (CAN)	11.350	11.500	11.375	11.125	45.350	
14	Anna-Marie Ondaatje (SRI)	10.800	11.675	12.050	10.350	44.875	Q
15	Gemma Frizelle (WAL)	13.400	11.400	9.150	10.350	44.300	Q
16	Hannah Martin (ENG)	10.850	12.300	10.100	10.450	43.700	Q
17	Stephani Sherlock (ENG)	11.250	11.050	10.450	10.050	42.800	Q
18	Grace Legote (RSA)	9.100	11.700	11.350	10.500	42.650	Q
19	Mimi-Isabella Cesar (ENG)	11.050	10.950	9.100	10.050	41.150	
20	Aiko Tan (SIN)	9.500	11.150	10.200	7.750	38.600	Q
21	Chris-Marie van Wyk (RSA)	8.950	8.850	10.200	7.200	35.200	Q
22	Stella Ebert (NZL)	10.400	7.400	9.300	7.550	34.650	R1
23	Meghana Reddy (IND)	9.900	7.300	10.000	7.400	34.600	R2
24	Jade Faulkner (NGR)	9.800	8.500	9.500	6.000	33.800	R3
25	Abigail Hanford (WAL)	7.700	6.850	8.650	4.900	28.100	
26	Emma Bosio (GIB)	6.550	5.700	5.650	5.400	23.300	R4

R1 = 1st reserve for final
R2 = 2nd reserve for final
R3 = 3rd reserve for final
R4 = 4th reserve for final

== Final ==
Results:

Rank	Gymnast	Hoop (rhythmic gymnastics)	Ball (rhythmic gymnastics)	Clubs (rhythmic gymnastics)	Ribbon (rhythmic gymnastics)	Total
1st place, gold medalist(s)	Diamanto Evripidou (CYP)	13.800	15.100	13.850	13.000	55.750
2nd place, silver medalist(s)	Katherine Uchida (CAN)	14.000	13.250	14.300	11.100	52.650
3rd place, bronze medalist(s)	Amy Kwan (MAS)	12.100	12.250	14.200	12.950	51.500
4	Enid Sung (AUS)	13.100	12.525	13.250	11.850	50.725
5	Laura Halford (WAL)	12.450	13.300	13.300	11.600	50.650
6	Viktoria Skittidi (CYP)	13.850	10.500	14.000	11.300	49.650
7	Hannah Martin (ENG)	13.250	12.000	12.250	11.850	49.350
8	Koi Sie Yan (MAS)	13.500	13.100	11.850	9.600	48.050
9	Sophie Crane (CAN)	12.150	12.450	14.175	9.200	47.975
10	Alexandra Kiroi-Bogatyreva (AUS)	11.950	12.500	10.500	11.150	46.100
11	Anna-Marie Ondaatje (SRI)	11.800	11.750	10.400	10.350	44.300
12	Gemma Frizelle (WAL)	11.000	11.650	9.275	11.200	43.125
13	Grace Legote (RSA)	8.650	11.500	11.350	11.400	42.900
14	Stephani Sherlock (ENG)	9.500	10.850	10.350	10.700	41.400
15	Aiko Tan (SIN)	9.200	10.050	9.700	8.250	37.200
16	Chris-Marie van Wyk (RSA)	10.000	8.500	9.650	8.400	36.550
