= Gymnastics at the 2018 Commonwealth Games – Women's rhythmic team all-around =

Women's rhythmic team all-around at the 2018 Commonwealth Games
- Venue: Coomera Indoor Sports Centre
- Dates: 11 April 2018
- Competitors: 18 from 6 nations
- Winning score: 130.625

Medalists
| gold medal | Diamanto Evripidou; Eleni Ellina; Viktoria Skittidi | Cyprus |
| silver medal | Amy Kwan; Koi Sie Yan; Izzah Amzan | Malaysia |
| bronze medal | Enid Sung; Danielle Prince; Alexandra Kiroi-Bogatyreva | Australia |

The women's rhythmic teams all-around gymnastics competition at the 2018 Commonwealth Games in Gold Coast, Australia was held on 11 April 2018 at the Coomera Indoor Sports Centre.

This event also determined the qualification standings for the individual all-around and apparatus finals.

== Final ==
The final results:

| Rank | Team | Hoop (rhythmic gymnastics) | Ball (rhythmic gymnastics) | Clubs (rhythmic gymnastics) | Ribbon (rhythmic gymnastics) | Total |
|---|---|---|---|---|---|---|
| 1st place, gold medalist(s) | Cyprus | 39.400 | 26.250 | 39.975 | 25.000 | 130.625 |
| 1st place, gold medalist(s) | Diamanto Evripidou | 14.550 | 14.600 | 14.375 | 13.450 | 130.625 |
| 1st place, gold medalist(s) | Eleni Ellina | 12.100 | 11.650 | 11.700 | 11.550 | 130.625 |
| 1st place, gold medalist(s) | Viktoria Skittidi | 12.750 | ~~11.350~~ | 13.900 | ~~11.450~~ | 130.625 |
| 2nd place, silver medalist(s) | Malaysia | 39.450 | 37.850 | 38.000 | 12.650 | 127.950 |
| 2nd place, silver medalist(s) | Amy Kwan | 13.400 | 11.550 | 12.400 | 12.650 | 127.950 |
| 2nd place, silver medalist(s) | Koi Sie Yan | 12.900 | 12.650 | 13.250 | ~~11.150~~ | 127.950 |
| 2nd place, silver medalist(s) | Izzah Amzan | 13.150 | 13.650 | 12.350 | ~~9.800~~ | 127.950 |
| 3rd place, bronze medalist(s) | Australia | 39.100 | 35.550 | 34.950 | 11.200 | 120.800 |
| 3rd place, bronze medalist(s) | Enid Sung | 13.450 | 11.150 | 12.100 | ~~10.750~~ | 120.800 |
| 3rd place, bronze medalist(s) | Danielle Prince | 13.100 | 12.150 | 11.400 | ~~10.550~~ | 120.800 |
| 3rd place, bronze medalist(s) | Alexandra Kiroi-Bogatyreva | 12.550 | 12.250 | 11.450 | 11.200 | 120.800 |
| 4 | Canada | 38.350 | 22.550 | 36.225 | 21.725 | 118.850 |
| 4 | Carmen Whelan | 11.350 | 11.500 | 11.375 | 11.125 | 118.850 |
| 4 | Katherine Uchida | 13.200 | 11.050 | 11.950 | ~~10.600~~ | 118.850 |
| 4 | Sophie Crane | 13.800 | ~~9.900~~ | 12.900 | 10.600 | 118.850 |
| 5 | Wales | 34.700 | 24.200 | 29.250 | 22.100 | 110.250 |
| 5 | Abigail Hanford | 7.700 | ~~6.850~~ | 8.650 | ~~4.900~~ | 110.250 |
| 5 | Gemma Frizelle | 13.400 | 11.400 | 9.150 | 10.350 | 110.250 |
| 5 | Laura Halford | 13.600 | 12.800 | 11.450 | 11.750 | 110.250 |
| 6 | England | 33.150 | 34.300 | 20.550 | 20.500 | 108.500 |
| 6 | Mimi-Isabella Cesar | 11.050 | 10.950 | ~~9.100~~ | ~~10.050~~ | 108.500 |
| 6 | Hannah Martin | 10.850 | 12.300 | 10.100 | 10.450 | 108.500 |
| 6 | Stephani Sherlock | 11.250 | 11.050 | 10.450 | 10.050 | 108.500 |
