= Gymnastics at the 2018 Commonwealth Games – Women's rhythmic individual clubs =

Women's rhythmic individual clubs at the 2018 Commonwealth Games
- Venue: Coomera Indoor Sports Centre
- Dates: 13 April 2018
- Competitors: 8 from 6 nations
- Winning score: 13.950

Medalists
gold medal	Sophie Crane	Canada
silver medal	Sie Yan Koi	Malaysia
bronze medal	Diamanto Evripidou	Cyprus

The women's rhythmic individual clubs gymnastics competition at the 2018 Commonwealth Games in Gold Coast, Australia was held on 13 April at the Coomera Indoor Sports Centre.

== Final ==
Results:

Place	Name	Clubs (rhythmic gymnastics)
1st place, gold medalist(s)	Sophie Crane (CAN)	13.950
2nd place, silver medalist(s)	Sie Yan Koi (MAS)	13.850
3rd place, bronze medalist(s)	Diamanto Evripidou (CYP)	13.550
4	Amy Kwan Dict Weng (MAS)	13.350
5	Katherine Uchida (CAN)	13.100
6	Anna-Marie Ondaatje (SRI)	11.200
7	Viktoria Skittidi (CYP)	11.150
8	Enid Sung (AUS)	9.850
