= Gymnastics at the 2018 Commonwealth Games – Women's rhythmic individual hoop =

Women's rhythmic individual hoop at the 2018 Commonwealth Games
- Venue: Coomera Indoor Sports Centre
- Dates: 13 April 2018
- Competitors: 8 from 5 nations
- Winning score: 14.850

Medalists
gold medal	Diamanto Evripidou	Cyprus
silver medal	Laura Halford	Wales
bronze medal	Amy Kwan Dict Weng	Malaysia

The women's rhythmic individual hoop gymnastics competition at the 2018 Commonwealth Games in Gold Coast, Australia was held on 13 April at the Coomera Indoor Sports Centre.

== Final ==
Results:

Place	Name	Hoop (rhythmic gymnastics)
1st place, gold medalist(s)	Diamanto Evripidou (CYP)	14.850
2nd place, silver medalist(s)	Laura Halford (WAL)	14.000
3rd place, bronze medalist(s)	Amy Kwan Dict Weng (MAS)	13.550
4	Enid Sung (AUS)	13.400
5	Katherine Uchida (CAN)	13.100
6	Izzah Amzan (MAS)	11.900
7	Sophie Crane (CAN)	11.375
8	Gemma Frizelle (WAL)	11.300
