= Cory Paterson =

Cory Paterson may refer to:

- Cory Paterson (gymnast), Canadian gymnast
- Cory Paterson (rugby league), Australian rugby league footballer
