= Cyprus at the 2018 Commonwealth Games =

- Flag of Cyprus
- CG code: CYP
- CGA: Cyprus Olympic Committee
- Website: olympic.org.cy (in Greek and English)

in Gold Coast, Australia 4 April 2018 – 15 April 2018
- Competitors: 46 in 8 sports
- Medals Ranked 10th: Gold 8 Silver 1 Bronze 5 Total 14

Commonwealth Games appearances (overview)
- 1978; 1982; 1986; 1990; 1994; 1998; 2002; 2006; 2010; 2014; 2018; 2022; 2026; 2030

Cyprus competed at the 2018 Commonwealth Games in the Gold Coast, Australia from 4 to 15 April 2018. It was Cyprus's 10th appearance at the Commonwealth Games.

The Cypriot team consists of 47 athletes competing in eight sports. Only 46 athletes competed.

== Medalists ==
Medal	Name	Sport	Event	Date
Gold	Marios Georgiou	Gymnastics	Men's Floor	8 April
Gold	Panagiota Andreou	Shooting	Women's Skeet	8 April
Gold	Marios Georgiou	Gymnastics	Men's Parallel Bars	9 April
Gold	Georgios Achilleos	Shooting	Men's Skeet	9 April
Gold	Eleni Ellina; Diamanto Evripidou; Viktoria Skittidi	Gymnastics	Women's Rhythmic Team All-Around	11 April
Gold	Diamanto Evripidou	Gymnastics	Women's Rhythmic All-Around	12 April
Gold	Diamanto Evripidou	Gymnastics	Women's hoop	13 April
Gold	Diamanto Evripidou	Gymnastics	Women's ball	13 April
Silver	Diamanto Evripidou	Gymnastics	Women's clubs	13 April
Bronze	Marios Georgiou	Gymnastics	Men's Artistic All-around	7 April
Bronze	Andri Eleftheriou	Shooting	Women's Skeet	8 April
Bronze	Apostolos Parellis	Athletics	Men's Discus Throw	13 April
Bronze	Diamanto Evripidou	Gymnastics	Women's ribbon	13 April
Bronze	Alexios Kaouslidis	Wrestling	Men's -97 kg	13 April

Medals by sport
Sport	1st place, gold medalist(s)	2nd place, silver medalist(s)	3rd place, bronze medalist(s)	Total
Athletics	0	0	1	1
Gymnastics	6	1	2	9
Shooting	2	0	1	3
Wrestling	0	0	1	1
Total	8	1	5	14

Medals by day
Day	1st place, gold medalist(s)	2nd place, silver medalist(s)	3rd place, bronze medalist(s)	Total
5 April	0	0	0	0
6 April	0	0	0	0
7 April	0	0	1	1
8 April	2	0	1	3
9 April	2	0	0	2
10 April	0	0	0	0
11 April	1	0	0	1
12 April	0	2	1	3
13 April	2	1	3	6
14 April	0	0	0	0
15 April	0	0	0	0
Total	8	1	5	14

Medals by gender
Gender	1st place, gold medalist(s)	2nd place, silver medalist(s)	3rd place, bronze medalist(s)	Total
Female	5	1	2	8
Male	3	0	3	6
Mixed	0	0	0	0
Total	8	1	5	14

== Competitors ==
The following is the list of number of competitors participating at the Games per sport/discipline.

Sport	Men	Women	Total
Athletics	10	7	17
Beach volleyball	2	2	4
Boxing	1	0	1
Cycling	1	1	2
Gymnastics	4	5	9
Shooting	5	5	10
Swimming	1	1	2
Wrestling	1	0	1
Total	25	21	46

== Athletics ==
Cyprus participated with 17 athletes (10 men and 7 women).

Men
Track & road events

Athlete	Event	Heat		Final	
Athlete	Event	Result	Rank	Result	Rank
Christos Dimitriou	800 m	1:47.82	4	did not advance	
Amine Khadiri	1500 m	3:44.29	4 Q	3:40.76	10
Christos Dimitriou	1500 m	3:49.84	7	did not advance	
Amine Khadiri	5000 m	—N/a		14:16:53	10
Milan Trajkovic	110 m hurdles	13.36	3 Q	13.42	4
Nikolas Fragkou	3000 m steeplechase	—N/a		9:03.12	10

Field events

Athlete	Event	Qualification		Final	
Athlete	Event	Distance	Rank	Distance	Rank
Vasilios Konstantinou	High jump	2.10	18	did not advance	
Nikandros Stylianou	Pole vault	—N/a		5.35	7
Andreas Christou	Discus throw	NM		did not advance	
Apostolos Parellis	Discus throw	61.45	5 q	63.61	3rd place, bronze medalist(s)
Alexandros Poursanidis	Hammer throw	—N/a		63.86	15
Constantinos Stathelakos	Hammer throw	—N/a		64.87	12

Women
Track & road events

Athlete	Event	Heat		Semifinal		Final	
Athlete	Event	Result	Rank	Result	Rank	Result	Rank
Ramona Papaioannou	100 m	11.65	4 q	11.67	6	did not advance	
Eleni Artymata	400 m	52.90	3 Q	52.38	5	did not advance	
Natalia Evangelidou	800 m	2:01.77	7	—N/a		did not advance	
Natalia Evangelidou	1500 m	4:10.98	7	—N/a		did not advance	
Natalia Christofi	100 m hurdles	13.66	5	—N/a		did not advance	

Field events

Athlete	Event	Qualification		Final	
Athlete	Event	Distance	Position	Distance	Position
Maria Aristotelous	Pole vault	—N/a		3.85	12
Nektaria Panagi	Long jump	6.63	4 Q	6.44	6
Androniki Lada	Discus throw	—N/a		53.12	8

== Beach volleyball ==
Cyprus qualified a women's beach volleyball team and received a wildcard for a men's team for a total of four athletes.

Athlete	Event	Preliminary round	Standing	Quarterfinals	Semifinals	Final / BM	
Athlete	Event	Opposition Score	Standing	Opposition Score	Opposition Score	Opposition Score	Rank
Dimitris Apostolou; Georgios Chrysostomou	Men's	O'Dea / O'Dea (NZL); L 1 - 2 (21–16, 19–21, 11–15); Gregory / Sheaf (ENG); L 0 - 2 (17–21, 7–21); Acácio / Soares (MOZ); W 2 - 0 (21–18, 21–17)	3 q	Pedlow / Schachter (CAN); L 0 - 2 (17–21, 15–21)	did not advance		
Manolina Konstantinou; Mariota Angelopoulou	Women's	Del Solar / Clancy (AUS); L 0 - 2 (14–21, 9–21); Beattie / Coutts (SCO); W 2 - 0 (21–8, 21–16); Stafford / Williams (GRN); W 2 - 0 (21–3, 21–14)	2 Q	Wills / Polley (NZL); W 2 - 0 (21–10, 21–17)	H-Paredes / Pavan (CAN); L 0 - 2 (7-21, 12-21)	Matauatu – Pata (VAN); L 0 - 2 (14-21, 10-21)	4

== Boxing ==
Cyprus participated with a team of 1 athlete (1 man)

Men

Athlete	Event	Round of 32	Round of 16	Quarterfinals	Semifinals	Final	Rank
Athlete	Event	Opposition Result	Opposition Result	Opposition Result	Opposition Result	Opposition Result	Rank
Andreas Kokkinos	−75 kg	BYE	John Docherty (SCO); L 0–5	did not advance			

== Cycling ==
Cyprus participated with 2 athletes (1 man and 1 woman).

=== Road ===
Men

Athlete	Event	Time	Rank
Andreas Miltiadis	Men's Road race	3:57:58	15
Andreas Miltiadis	Men's Time trial	53:16.94	20
Antri Christoforou	Women's Road race	3:02:31	11
Antri Christoforou	Women's Time trial	38:01.11	6

=== Mountain bike ===
Athlete	Event	Time	Rank
Andreas Miltiadis	Men's cross-country	1:28:18	15
Antri Christoforou	Women's cross-country	-1LAP	10

== Gymnastics ==
=== Artistic ===
Cyprus participated with 6 athletes (4 men and 2 women).

Men
Team Final & Individual Qualification

Athlete	Event	Apparatus						Total	Rank
Athlete	Event	F	PH	R	V	PB	HB	Total	Rank
Marios Georgiou	Team	13.950 Q	12.900	13.750 Q	14.300 Q	14.150 Q	10.950	80.000	7 Q
Ilias Georgiou	Team	12.900	13.050	13.350	13.425	14.300 Q	13.750 Q	80.775	6 Q
Michalis Krasias	Team	11.600	12.550	13.000	13.400	11.750	13.050	75.350	20
Neofytos Kyriakou	Team	13.150	11.000	—N/a	13.950 Q	12.400	12.050	—N/a	
Total	Team	40.000	38.500	40.100	41.675	40.850	38.850	239.975	4

Individual Finals

Athlete	Event	Apparatus						Total	Rank
Athlete	Event	F	PH	R	V	PB	HB	Total	Rank
Marios Georgiou	All-around	13.600	14.100	13.950	14.250	13.950	13.900	83.750	3rd place, bronze medalist(s)
Marios Georgiou	Floor	13.966	—N/a					13.966	1st place, gold medalist(s)
Marios Georgiou	Rings	—N/a		13.766	—N/a			13.766	5
Marios Georgiou	Vault	—N/a			13.933	—N/a		13.933	6
Marios Georgiou	Parallel bars	—N/a				14.533	—N/a	14.533	1st place, gold medalist(s)
Ilias Georgiou	All-around	13.300	11.600	12.650	13.300	13.950	13.500	78.300	9
Ilias Georgiou	Parallel bars	—N/a				13.083	—N/a	13.083	7
Ilias Georgiou	Horizonral bar	—N/a					12.533	12.533	7
Neofytos Kyriakou	Vault	—N/a			13.716	—N/a		13.716	8

Women
Individual Qualification

Athlete	Event	Apparatus				Total	Rank
Athlete	Event	V	UB	BB	F	Total	Rank
Eleni Eliades	Qualification	12.100	8.350	9.900	10.000	40.350	27
Gloria Philassides	Qualification	12.050	7.800	9.350	10.100	39.300	28

=== Rhythmic ===
Cyprus participated with 3 athletes (3 women).

Team & Individual Qualification

Athlete	Event	Apparatus				Total	Rank
Athlete	Event	Hoop	Ball	Clubs	Ribbon	Total	Rank
Eleni Ellina	Team	12.100	11.650	11.700	11.550 Q	47.000	10
Diamanto Evripidou	Team	14.550 Q	14.600 Q	14.375 Q	13.450 Q	56.975	1 Q
Viktoria Skittidi	Team	12.750	~~11.350~~	13.900 Q	~~11.450~~	49.450	5 Q
Total	Team	39.400	26.250	39.975	25.000	130.625	1st place, gold medalist(s)

Individual Finals

Athlete	Event	Apparatus				Total	Rank
Athlete	Event	Hoop	Ball	Clubs	Ribbon	Total	Rank
Eleni Ellina	Ribbon	—N/a			9.950	9.950	7
Diamanto Evripidou	All-around	13.800	15.100	13.850	13.000	55.750	1st place, gold medalist(s)
Diamanto Evripidou	Hoop	14.850	—N/a			14.850	1st place, gold medalist(s)
Diamanto Evripidou	Ball	—N/a	13.800	—N/a		13.800	1st place, gold medalist(s)
Diamanto Evripidou	Clubs	—N/a		13.550	—N/a	13.550	3rd place, bronze medalist(s)
Diamanto Evripidou	Ribbon	—N/a			12.900	12.900	2nd place, silver medalist(s)
Viktoria Skittidi	All-around	13.850	10.500	14.000	11.300	49.650	6
Viktoria Skittidi	Clubs	—N/a		11.150	—N/a	11.150	7

== Shooting ==
Cyprus participated with 10 athletes (5 men and 5 women).

Men

Athlete	Event	Qualification		Final	
Athlete	Event	Points	Rank	Points	Rank
Alexandros Christoforou	10 metre air rifle	603.6	16	did not advance	
Andreas Makri	Trap	115	10	did not advance	
Stephen Theodotou	Double trap	131	7	did not advance	
Georgios Achilleos	Skeet	123	1 Q	57	1st place, gold medalist(s)
George Kazakos	Skeet	116	13	did not advance	

Women

Athlete	Event	Qualification		Final	
Athlete	Event	Points	Rank	Points	Rank
Marilena Constantinou	10 metre air rifle	405.9	13	did not advance	
Panagiota Charalampous	10 metre air pistol	360	15	did not advance	
Georgia Konstantinidou	Trap	63	10	did not advance	
Georgia Konstantinidou	Double trap	—N/a		84	5
Panagiota Andreou	Skeet	74	1 Q	40	3rd place, bronze medalist(s)
Andri Eleftheriou	Skeet	69	6 Q	52	1st place, gold medalist(s)

== Swimming ==
Cyprus participated with 2 athletes (1 man and 1 woman).

Athlete	Event	Heat		Semifinal		Final	
Athlete	Event	Time	Rank	Time	Rank	Time	Rank
Constantinos Hadjittooulis	Men's 200 m freestyle	1:58.36	24	—N/a		did not advance	
Constantinos Hadjittooulis	Men's 400 m freestyle	4:06.03	13	—N/a		did not advance	
Constantinos Hadjittooulis	Men's 1500 m freestyle	—N/a				16:26.93	8
Kalia Antoniou	Women's 50 m freestyle	25.97	11 Q	25.89	10	did not advance	
Kalia Antoniou	Women's 100 m freestyle	58.65	19	did not advance			
Kalia Antoniou	Women's 50 m backstroke	30.62	21	did not advance			

== Wrestling ==
Cyprus participated with 1 athlete (1 man).

Men

Athlete	Event	Round of 16	Quarterfinal	Semifinal	Repechage	Final / BM	
Athlete	Event	Opposition Result	Opposition Result	Opposition Result	Opposition Result	Opposition Result	Rank
Alexios Kaouslidis	-97 kg	Bye	Khatri (IND); L 0 - 4	Did not advance	Bye	Tamarau (NGR); W 3 - 1	3rd place, bronze medalist(s)

== See also ==
- Cyprus at the 2018 Summer Youth Olympics
