= Marios Georgiou =

Cypriot artistic gymnast

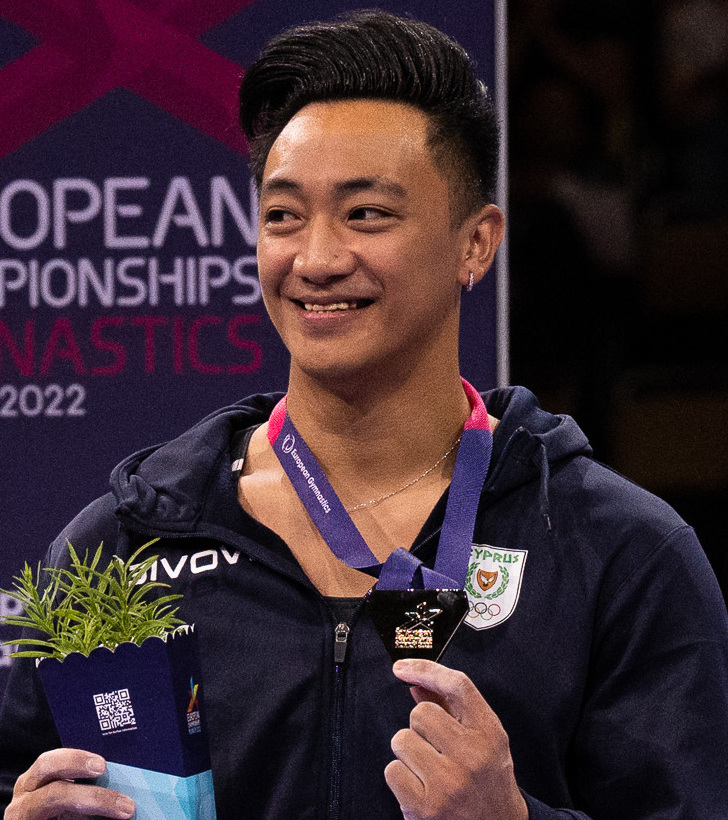
- Georgiou at the 2022 European Championships

Personal information
- Born: 10 November 1997 (age 28) Limassol, Cyprus
- Height: 1.67 m (5 ft 6 in)

Gymnastics career
- Discipline: Men's artistic gymnastics
- Country represented: Cyprus (2014–present)
- Club: Athanasia Gymnastics Club
- Head coach: Panagiotis Petridis
Medal record
Men's artistic gymnastics
Representing Cyprus
European Games
Silver medal – second place	2019 Minsk	Parallel bars
European Championships
Gold medal – first place	2022 Munich	Horizontal bar
Gold medal – first place	2024 Rimini	All-around
Silver medal – second place	2024 Rimini	Parallel bars
Silver medal – second place	2026 Zagreb	Horizontal bar
Bronze medal – third place	2019 Szczecin	All-around
Bronze medal – third place	2024 Rimini	Pommel horse
Bronze medal – third place	2024 Rimini	Horizontal bar
Commonwealth Games
Gold medal – first place	2018 Gold Coast	Floor exercise
Gold medal – first place	2018 Gold Coast	Parallel bars
Silver medal – second place	2026 Glasgow	Parallel bars
Silver medal – second place	2026 Glasgow	Horizontal bar
Bronze medal – third place	2018 Gold Coast	All-around
Bronze medal – third place	2022 Birmingham	Team
Bronze medal – third place	2022 Birmingham	All-around
Bronze medal – third place	2022 Birmingham	Parallel bars
Bronze medal – third place	2022 Birmingham	Horizontal bar
Mediterranean Games
Gold medal – first place	2018 Tarragona	All-around
Gold medal – first place	2018 Tarragona	Horizontal bar
Gold medal – first place	2022 Oran	Horizontal bar
Gold medal – first place	2026 Taranto	All-around
Gold medal – first place	2026 Taranto	Horizontal bar
Silver medal – second place	2018 Tarragona	Parallel bars
Silver medal – second place	2026 Taranto	Parallel bars
Bronze medal – third place	2018 Tarragona	Pommel horse
Bronze medal – third place	2022 Oran	All-around
Games of the Small States of Europe
Gold medal – first place	2015 Iceland	Team
Gold medal – first place	2015 Iceland	All-around
Gold medal – first place	2015 Iceland	Pommel horse
Gold medal – first place	2015 Iceland	Vault
Gold medal – first place	2015 Iceland	Parallel bars
Gold medal – first place	2015 Iceland	Horizontal bar
Bronze medal – third place	2015 Iceland	Floor exercise

Marios Georgiou (Greek: Μάριος Γεωργίου; born 10 November 1997) is a Cypriot artistic gymnast. He is the 2024 European all-around champion, the 2022 European horizontal bar champion, and the first gymnast from Cyprus to win a European title and a major all-around title. He is the 2019 European Championships all-around bronze medalist, which made him the first gymnast from Cyprus to win a European medal. He is the 2019 European Games parallel bars silver medalist. At the 2018 Commonwealth Games, he won the gold medals in the floor exercise and parallel bars and the bronze medal in the all-around, and he won four bronze medals at the 2022 Commonwealth Games. He is the 2018 Mediterranean Games all-around and horizontal bar champion and the 2022 Mediterranean Games horizontal bar champion. He competed at the 2016, 2020, and 2024 Olympic Games.

== Early life ==
Marios Georgiou was born in Limassol and is the son of a Cypriot father and a Filipina mother. He has four half-siblings. He began gymnastics when he was three years old.

== Gymnastics career ==
Georgiou competed at the 2013 Gymnasiade and won the gold medal on the pommel horse. He then competed at the 2014 Junior European Championships and finished tenth in the all-around final. He also qualified for the rings final, where he finished fifth. He represented Cyprus at the 2014 Summer Youth Olympics. However, during the qualification round, he injured his finger and withdrew from the rest of the competition.

=== 2015–2016 ===
Georgiou began competing at the senior level in 2015. He competed at the 2015 European Championships in Montpellier, France. He qualified for the all-around final, where he finished 19th. He then competed at the 2015 Games of the Small States of Europe and won the gold medals in every event except the floor exercise and the rings. He represented Cyprus at the 2015 European Games and was the first reserve for the all-around final and the third reserve for the horizontal bar final. Then at the 2015 World Championships in Glasgow, he finished 44th in the all-around and qualified for the 2016 Olympic Test Event. At the Test Event, he finished 38th in the all-around and qualified for the 2016 Olympic Games.

Georgiou represented Cyprus at the 2016 Summer Olympics and qualified for the all-around final, becoming the first gymnast from Cyprus to advance to an Olympic final. However, he had to withdraw in the middle of the final due to an ankle injury.

=== 2017–18 ===
Georgiou began the 2017 season at the European Championships in Cluj-Napoca where he finished thirteenth in the all-around final. He won the bronze medal on the horizontal bar at both the Koper and Szombathely World Challenge Cups. He then represented Cyprus at the 2017 Summer Universiade and finished 15th in the all-around final and sixth in the horizontal bar final. At the 2017 World Championships in Montreal, he finished 16th in the all-around final.

Georgiou represented Cyprus at the 2018 Commonwealth Games, helping the team finish fourth. In the all-around final, he won the bronze medal behind English gymnasts Nile Wilson and James Hall. He then finished sixth in the vault final and fifth in the rings final. He won the gold medals in both the floor exercise and parallel bars finals. He then competed at the 2018 Mediterranean Games and helped the Cypriot team finish fifth. Individually, he won the gold medal in the all-around and horizontal bar, the silver medal on parallel bars behind Ahmet Önder, and the bronze medal on the pommel horse behind Cyril Tommasone and Robert Seligman. At the 2018 Osijek World Challenge Cup, Georgiou won his first World Challenge Cup gold medal by winning the parallel bars. He did not qualify for any finals at the 2018 European Championships. He then won the bronze medal on the horizontal bar at the Szombathely World Challenge Cup. He finished tenth in the all-around final at the 2018 World Championships, the highest World all-around finish ever for a gymnast from Cyprus.

=== 2019 ===
Georgiou competed at the 2019 European Championships and won the bronze medal in the all-around behind Russians Nikita Nagornyy and Artur Dalaloyan. This marked the first time a gymnast from Cyprus won a medal in the all-around at the European Artistic Gymnastics Championships. He also finished eighth in the pommel horse final. He then represented Cyprus at the 2019 European Games and finished 18th in the all-around final. In the parallel bars final, he won the silver medal behind Ukrainian gymnast Oleg Verniaiev. He also finished fifth in the pommel horse final. At the 2019 World Championships in Stuttgart, he finished 47th in the all-around during the qualification round and qualified for the 2020 Olympic Games.

=== 2021–2022 ===
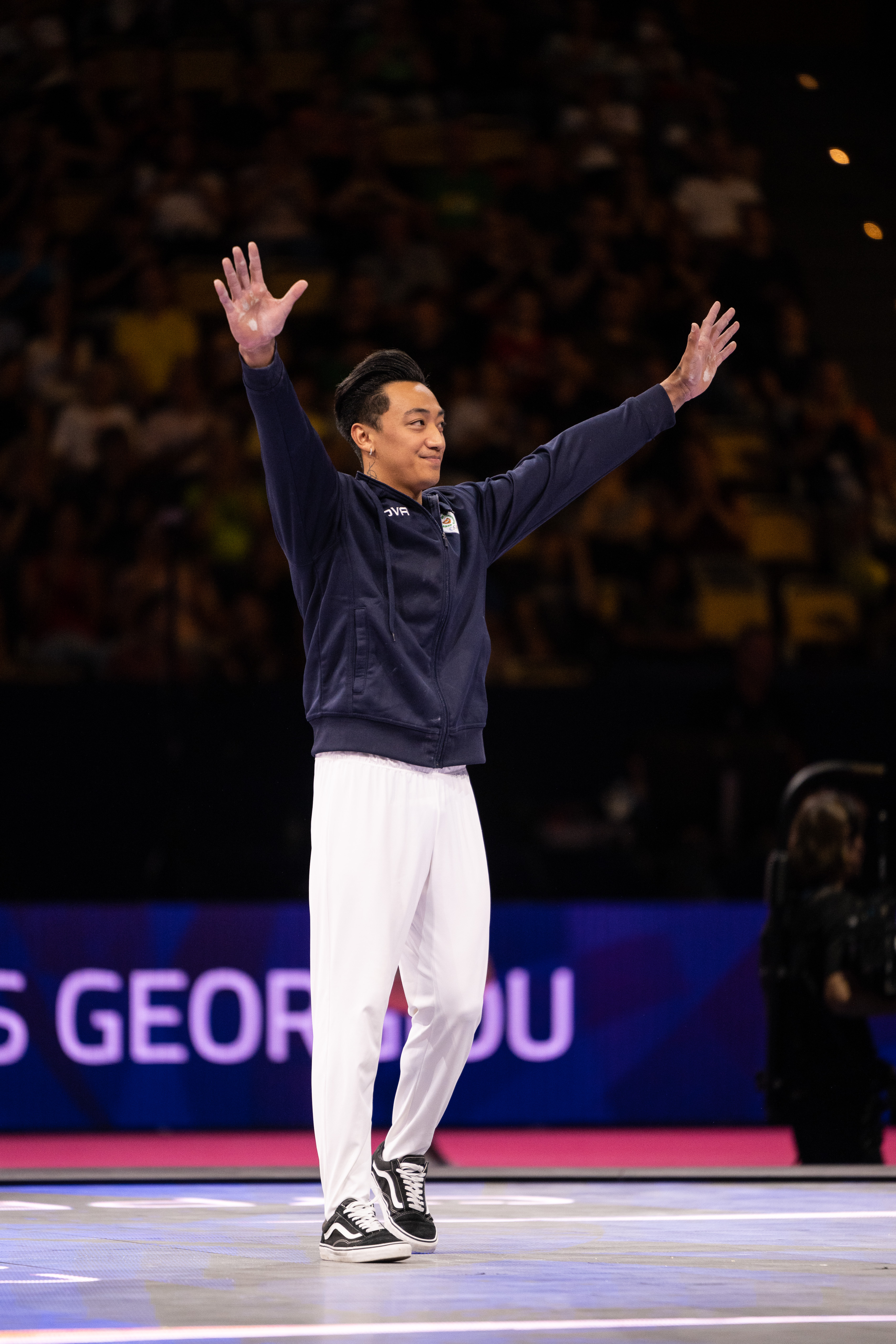
Georgiou at the 2022 European Championships

Georgiou won the gold medal on the horizontal bar at the 2021 Doha World Cup. He then represented Cyprus at the postponed-2020 Summer Olympics. He did not qualify for any finals, but he was the first reserve for the horizontal bar final after finishing ninth in the qualification round. He then competed at the 2021 World Championships and was the first reserve for the parallel bars final.

At the 2022 Varna World Challenge Cup, Georgiou won the gold medals on the pommel horse, parallel bars, and horizontal bar. He then represented Cyprus at the 2022 Mediterranean Games and helped the team finish in fifth place. Then in the all-around final, he won the bronze medal behind Adem Asil and Joel Plata. He then won the gold medal in the horizontal bar final. He was represented Cyprus at the 2022 Commonwealth Games and was selected to be the flagbearer during the Parade of Nations. The Cypriot team won the bronze medal behind England and Canada. Then in the all-around final, he repreated as the Commonwealth all-around bronze medalist behind English gymnasts Jake Jarman and James Hall. He also won the bronze medal in the parallel bars final behind English gymnasts Joe Fraser and Giarnni Regini-Moran and in the horizontal bar final behind teammate Ilias Georgiou and Australian Tyson Bull. He also finished seventh in the pommel horse final. Then at the 2022 European Championships, he won the gold medal in the horizontal bar final with a score of 14.400. He became the first gymnast from Cyprus to win a gold medal at the European Championships.

After the European Championships, Georgiou competed at the Paris World Challenge Cup and placed eighth in the horizontal bar final. At the World Championships, he competed on the parallel bars and the horizontal bar and finished 14th in the qualification round on both.

=== 2023–2024 ===
Georgiou did not compete at the 2023 European Championships due to an injury. He had surgery on his shoulder in November 2022 and returned to competition in September at the Szombathely World Challenge Cup and won a silver medal on the horizontal bar behind teammate Ilias Georgiou. He only competed on the horizontal bar at the 2023 World Championships, finishing 54th in the qualification round.

Georgiou began the Olympic season at the Cairo World Cup and placed seventh on the horizontal bar. He then placed fifth on the same event at the Doha World Cup. At the 2024 European Championships, Georgiou made history by becoming the first Cypriot to win the European all-around title. By winning the all-around, he qualified for his third Olympic Games. Additionally, he helped Cyprus qualify for their first ever team final at the European Championships where they ultimately finished seventh. During event final Georgiou picked up an additional three medals: silver on parallel bars and bronze on pommel horse and horizontal bar.

== Competitive history ==
Competitive history of Marios Georgiou
Year	Event	Team	AA	FX	PH	SR	VT	PB	HB
2013	Gymnasiade				1st place, gold medalist(s)				
2014
2014	Junior European Championships		10			5			
2014	Youth Olympic Games		DNF						
2015
2015	European Championships		19						
2015	Varna Challenge Cup				8			8	
2015	Games of the Small States of Europe	1st place, gold medalist(s)	1st place, gold medalist(s)	3rd place, bronze medalist(s)	1st place, gold medalist(s)		1st place, gold medalist(s)	1st place, gold medalist(s)	1st place, gold medalist(s)
2015	European Games		27						
2015	World Championships		54						
2016	Olympic Test Event		38						
2016	Olympic Games		DNF						
2017	Doha World Cup								6
2017	European Championships		13						
2017	Koper World Challenge Cup							3rd place, bronze medalist(s)	6
2017	Szombathely World Challenge Cup				5			7	3rd place, bronze medalist(s)
2017	World Championships		16						
2018
2018	Commonwealth Games	4	3rd place, bronze medalist(s)	1st place, gold medalist(s)		5	6	1st place, gold medalist(s)	
2018	Osijek World Challenge Cup							1st place, gold medalist(s)	7
2018	Mediterranean Games	5	1st place, gold medalist(s)		3rd place, bronze medalist(s)			2nd place, silver medalist(s)	1st place, gold medalist(s)
2018	European Championships					18			
2018	Szombathely World Challenge Cup			7				7	3rd place, bronze medalist(s)
2018	Paris World Challenge Cup							7	5
2018	World Championships	30	10						
2018	Cottbus World Cup							4	
2019
2019	European Championships		3rd place, bronze medalist(s)		8				
2019	European Games		18		5			2nd place, silver medalist(s)	
2019	World Championships		47						
2021	Doha World Cup				6				1st place, gold medalist(s)
2021	Olympic Games								R1
2021	World Championships							R1	
2022	Cairo World Cup							4	
2022	Baku World Cup				4			WD	8
2022	Varna World Challenge Cup			4	1st place, gold medalist(s)	6	6	1st place, gold medalist(s)	1st place, gold medalist(s)
2022	Mediterranean Games	6	3rd place, bronze medalist(s)		7				1st place, gold medalist(s)
2022	Commonwealth Games	3rd place, bronze medalist(s)	3rd place, bronze medalist(s)		7			3rd place, bronze medalist(s)	3rd place, bronze medalist(s)
2022	European Championships								1st place, gold medalist(s)
2022	Paris World Challenge Cup								8
2022	World Championships							14	14
2023	Szombathely World Challenge Cup								2nd place, silver medalist(s)
2023	World Championships								54
2024	Cairo World Cup								7
2024	Doha World Cup								5
2024	European Championships	7	1st place, gold medalist(s)		3rd place, bronze medalist(s)			2nd place, silver medalist(s)	3rd place, bronze medalist(s)
2024	Olympic Games		R4						6
2025	Cairo World Cup								2nd place, silver medalist(s)
2025	Varna World Challenge Cup				8				2nd place, silver medalist(s)
2025	European Championships								4
2026	Cairo World Cup								2nd place, silver medalist(s)
2026	Commonwealth Games	5	4		5			2nd place, silver medalist(s)	2nd place, silver medalist(s)
2026	European Championships		6						2nd place, silver medalist(s)
2026	Mediterranean Games	6	1st place, gold medalist(s)					2nd place, silver medalist(s)	1st place, gold medalist(s)
