= Gymnastics at the 2014 Commonwealth Games – Women's rhythmic team all-around =

Women's rhythmic team all-around at the 2014 Commonwealth Games
- Venue: Scottish Exhibition and Conference Centre
- Dates: 24 July 2014
- Competitors: 27 from 9 nations
- Winning score: 141.450

Medalists
gold medal	Annabelle Kovacs; Maria Kitkarska; Patricia Bezzoubenko	Canada
silver medal	Nikara Jenkins; Francesca Jones; Laura Halford	Wales
bronze medal	Fatin Zakirah Zain Jalany; Wong Poh San; Amy Kwan Dict Weng	Malaysia

The women's rhythmic teams all-around gymnastics competition at the 2014 Commonwealth Games in Glasgow, Scotland was held on 24 July at the Scottish Exhibition and Conference Centre.

== Final ==
The final results:

Rank	Team	Hoop (rhythmic gymnastics)	Ball (rhythmic gymnastics)	Clubs (rhythmic gymnastics)	Ribbon (rhythmic gymnastics)	Total
1st place, gold medalist(s)	Canada	43.150	40.500	41.900	40.075	141.450
1st place, gold medalist(s)	Annabelle Kovacs	13.900	12.325	11.850	12.625	141.450
1st place, gold medalist(s)	Maria Kitkarska	13.500	13.675	14.475	13.700	141.450
1st place, gold medalist(s)	Patricia Bezzoubenko	15.750	14.500	15.575	13.750	141.450
2nd place, silver medalist(s)	Wales	39.700	40.200	40.550	38.925	136.625
2nd place, silver medalist(s)	Nikara Jenkins	11.200	11.550	11.900	11.850	136.625
2nd place, silver medalist(s)	Francesca Jones	14.000	14.450	15.150	13.675	136.625
2nd place, silver medalist(s)	Laura Halford	14.500	14.200	13.500	13.400	136.625
3rd place, bronze medalist(s)	Malaysia	41.250	37.175	41.025	39.350	135.825
3rd place, bronze medalist(s)	Fatin Zakirah Zain Jalany	12.300	11.300	12.800	11.675	135.825
3rd place, bronze medalist(s)	Wong Poh San	14.550	12.250	14.475	13.925	135.825
3rd place, bronze medalist(s)	Amy Kwan Dict Weng	14.400	13.625	13.750	13.750	135.825
4	England	37.950	39.650	37.200	39.550	132.100
4	Stephani Sherlock	14.150	13.525	12.550	13.200	132.100
4	Mimi-Isabella Cesar	12.850	13.225	11.300	12.450	132.100
4	Lynne Hutchison	10.950	12.900	13.350	13.900	132.100
5	Australia	36.725	38.400	36.450	36.800	126.725
5	Amy Quinn	11.050	12.725	10.600	11.600	126.725
5	Jaelle Cohen	12.075	12.250	12.150	12.200	126.725
5	Danielle Prince	13.600	13.425	13.700	13.000	126.725
6	South Africa	35.825	36.100	37.650	37.900	125.850
6	Aimee van Rooyen	10.875	11.850	12.100	12.200	125.850
6	Julene van Rooyen	11.550	10.750	11.550	11.800	125.850
6	Grace Legote	13.400	13.500	14.000	13.900	125.850
7	Scotland	33.100	29.675	33.825	31.500	109.625
7	Victoria Clow	10.475	9.375	10.350	10.300	109.625
7	Rebecca Bee	11.325	9.100	11.025	9.400	109.625
7	Lauren Brash	11.300	11.200	12.450	11.800	109.625
8	Singapore	31.650	29.800	32.850	32.125	108.825
8	Yi Lin Phaan	9.050	9.150	9.850	9.050	108.825
8	Daphne Theresa Chia	11.375	8.550	11.400	11.350	108.825
8	Kah Mun Tong	11.225	12.100	11.600	11.725	108.825
9	India	20.850	21.200	23.300	18.900	73.050
9	Prabhjot Bajwa	8.300	8.075	8.950	7.600	73.050
9	Palak Kour Bijral	5.600	6.625	6.650	5.700	73.050
9	Mitali Mitali	6.950	6.500	7.700	5.600	73.050
