= Gymnastics at the 2018 Commonwealth Games – Men's parallel bars =

Men's parallel bars at the 2018 Commonwealth Games
- Venue: Coomera Indoor Sports Centre
- Dates: 5 April 2018 (qualification); 9 April 2018 (final)
- Competitors: 8 from 5 nations
- Winning score: 14.533

Medalists
gold medal	Marios Georgiou	Cyprus
silver medal	Nile Wilson	England
bronze medal	Frank Baines	Scotland

The Men's parallel bars gymnastics competition at the 2018 Commonwealth Games in Gold Coast, Australia was held on 9 April 2018 at the Coomera Indoor Sports Centre.

== Schedule ==
The schedule is as follows:

All times are Australian Eastern Standard Time (UTC+10:00)

Date	Time	Round
Thursday 5 April 2018	09:08	Qualification
Sunday 9 April 2018	15:23	Final

== Results ==
=== Qualification ===
Qualification for this apparatus final was determined within the team final.

=== Final ===
The results are as follows:

Rank	Gymnast	Difficulty	Execution	Penalty	Total
1st place, gold medalist(s)	Marios Georgiou (CYP)	6.000	8.533		14.533
2nd place, silver medalist(s)	Nile Wilson (ENG)	6.100	8.433		14.533
3rd place, bronze medalist(s)	Frank Baines (SCO)	5.500	8.900		14.400
4	René Cournoyer (CAN)	5.500	8.800		14.300
5	James Hall (ENG)	6.000	8.100		14.100
6	Cory Paterson (CAN)	5.500	8.500		14.000
7	Ilias Georgiou (CYP)	5.400	7.683		13.083
8	Iwan Mepham (WAL)	5.300	7.066		12.366
