= Gymnastics at the 2018 Commonwealth Games – Men's floor =

Men's floor at the 2018 Commonwealth Games
- Venue: Coomera Indoor Sports Centre
- Dates: 5 April 2018 (qualification); 8 April 2018 (final)
- Competitors: 8 from 6 nations
- Winning score: 13.966

Medalists
gold medal	Marios Georgiou	Cyprus
silver medal	Scott Morgan	Canada
bronze medal	Daniel Purvis	Scotland

The Men's floor gymnastics competition at the 2018 Commonwealth Games in Gold Coast, Australia was held on 8 April 2018 at the Coomera Indoor Sports Centre.

== Schedule ==
The schedule is as follows:

All times are Australian Eastern Standard Time (UTC+10:00)

Date	Time	Round
Thursday 5 April 2018	09:08	Qualification
Saturday 8 April 2018	14:33	Final

== Results ==
=== Qualification ===
Qualification for this apparatus final was determined within the team final.

=== Final ===
The results are as follows:

Rank	Gymnast	Difficulty	Execution	Penalty	Total
1st place, gold medalist(s)	Marios Georgiou (CYP)	5.500	8.466		13.966
2nd place, silver medalist(s)	Scott Morgan (CAN)	6.100	7.733		13.833
3rd place, bronze medalist(s)	Daniel Purvis (SCO)	5.500	8.333	0.100	13.733
4	Hamish Carter (SCO)	5.800	7.833		13.633
5	Ethan Dick (NZL)	5.300	8.200		13.500
6	Max Whitlock (ENG)	5.700	7.733	0.100	13.333
7	Jac Davies (WAL)	5.300	7.600	0.100	12.800
8	Nile Wilson (ENG)	5.500	7.100	0.200	12.400
