= Gymnastics at the 2018 Commonwealth Games – Women's rhythmic individual ribbon =

Women's rhythmic individual ribbon at the 2018 Commonwealth Games
- Venue: Coomera Indoor Sports Centre
- Dates: 13 April 2018
- Competitors: 8 from 5 nations
- Winning score: 13.200

Medalists
gold medal	Amy Kwan Dict Weng	Malaysia
silver medal	Diamanto Evripidou	Cyprus
bronze medal	Sie Yan Koi	Malaysia

The women's rhythmic individual ribbon gymnastics competition at the 2018 Commonwealth Games in Gold Coast, Australia was held on 13 April at the Coomera Indoor Sports Centre. Gold Medalist Amy Kwan Dict Weng originally scored 12.900 points, but after an appeal on the judge's score by her team manager, her score was rectified to 13.200 points.

== Final ==
Results:

Place	Name	Ribbon (rhythmic gymnastics)
1st place, gold medalist(s)	Amy Kwan Dict Weng (MAS)	13.200
2nd place, silver medalist(s)	Diamanto Evripidou (CYP)	12.900
3rd place, bronze medalist(s)	Sie Yan Koi (MAS)	12.000
4	Laura Halford (WAL)	11.900
5	Alexandra Kiroi-Bogatyreva (AUS)	11.350
6	Enid Sung (AUS)	10.200
7	Eleni Ellina (CYP)	9.950
8	Katherine Uchida (CAN)	9.450
