= Gymnastics at the 2018 Commonwealth Games – Women's rhythmic individual ball =

Women's rhythmic individual ball at the 2018 Commonwealth Games
- Venue: Coomera Indoor Sports Centre
- Dates: 13 April 2018
- Competitors: 8 from 6 nations
- Winning score: 13.800

Medalists
gold medal	Diamanto Evripidou	Cyprus
silver medal	Sie Yan Koi	Malaysia
bronze medal	Alexandra Kiroi-Bogatyreva	Australia

The women's rhythmic individual ball gymnastics competition at the 2018 Commonwealth Games in Gold Coast, Australia was held on 13 April at the Coomera Indoor Sports Centre.

== Final ==
Results:

Place	Name	Ball (rhythmic gymnastics)
1st place, gold medalist(s)	Diamanto Evripidou (CYP)	13.800
2nd place, silver medalist(s)	Sie Yan Koi (MAS)	13.400
3rd place, bronze medalist(s)	Alexandra Kiroi-Bogatyreva (AUS)	13.250
4	Laura Halford (WAL)	12.700
5	Hannah Martin (ENG)	12.500
6	Izzah Amzan (MAS)	12.450
7	Grace Legote (RSA)	12.150
8	Danielle Prince (AUS)	7.600
