= Gymnastics at the 2017 SEA Games =

- Venue: MATRADE Exhibition and Convention Centre
- Date: August 2017

The gymnastics competitions at the 2017 SEA Games in Kuala Lumpur were held at MATRADE Exhibition and Convention Centre in Segambut.

The 2017 Games feature competitions in twenty events (men 7 events and women 13 events).

== Events ==
The following events will be contested:

- Artistic
  - Team all-round
  - Balance beam (event for women)
  - Floor
  - Horizontal bar (event for men)
  - Parallel bars (event for men)
  - Pommel horse (event for men)
  - Ring (event for men)
  - Uneven bars (event for women)
  - Vault
- Rhythmic (events for women)
  - Group all-around
  - Individual all-round
  - Single apparatus
  - Mixed apparatus
  - Ball
  - Clubs
  - Hoop
  - Ribbon

== Participation ==
=== Participating nations ===
- Brunei
- Cambodia
- Indonesia
- Laos
- Malaysia
- Myanmar
- Philippines
- Singapore
- Thailand
- Timor-Leste
- Vietnam

== Medal summary ==
=== Medal table ===
* Host nation (Malaysia)

Rank	Nation	Gold	Silver	Bronze	Total
1	Malaysia*	13	9	2	24
2	Vietnam	5	4	0	9
3	Philippines	2	1	3	6
4	Indonesia	1	2	6	9
5	Singapore	0	2	3	5
6	Thailand	0	1	7	8
Totals (6 entries)		21	19	21	61

=== Men's artistic ===
Event	Gold	Silver	Bronze
Team all-around	Vietnam; Đặng Nam; Đinh Phương Thành; Đỗ Vũ Hưng; Lê Thanh Tùng; Phạm Phước Hưng; Trần Đình Vương	Malaysia; Azroy Amierol Jaafar; Chau Jern Rong; Loo Phay Xing; Muhd Abdul Azim Othman; Tan Fu Jie; Zul Bahrin Mat Asri	Thailand; Jamorn Prommanee; Natthawat Lamaiwan; Natthawut Lamaiwan; Nattipong Aeadwong; Tikumporn Surintornta; Tissanupan Wichianpradit
Floor	Reyland Capellan; Philippines	Zul Bahrin Mat Asri; Malaysia	Tikumporn Surintornta; Thailand
Pommel horse	Tan Fu Jie; Malaysia	shared gold	Jamorn Prommanee; Thailand
Pommel horse	Loo Phay Xing; Malaysia	shared gold	Jamorn Prommanee; Thailand
Rings	Đặng Nam; Vietnam	Phạm Phước Hưng; Vietnam	Dwi Samsul Arifin; Indonesia
Vault	Lê Thanh Tùng; Vietnam	Agus Adi Prayoko; Indonesia	Reyland Cappelan; Philippines
Parallel bars	Đinh Phương Thành; Vietnam	Phạm Phước Hưng; Vietnam	Jamorn Prommanee; Thailand
Horizontal bar	Lê Thanh Tùng; Vietnam	Đinh Phương Thành; Vietnam	Loo Phay Xing; Malaysia

=== Women's artistic ===
Event	Gold	Silver	Bronze
Team all-around	Malaysia; Farah Ann Abdul Hadi; Lavinia Raymund-Jayadev; Nur Azira Aziri; Nur Eli Ellina Azmi; Tan Ing Yueh; Tracie Ang	Singapore; Colette Chan Wan Xuan; Kelsie Yasmin Muir; Nadine Joy Nathan; Tan Sze En; Togawa Mei; Zeng Qiyan	Indonesia; Amalia Fauziah Nurun Nubuwah; Armartiani; Rifda Irfanaluthfi; Tazsa Miranda Devira
Vault	Tan Ing Yueh; Malaysia	Rifda Irfanaluthfi; Indonesia	Tracie Ang; Malaysia
Uneven bars	Kaitlin De Guzman; Philippines	Tracie Ang; Malaysia	Rifda Irfanaluthfi; Indonesia
Balance beam	Rifda Irfanaluthfi; Indonesia	Tan Ing Yueh; Malaysia	Kaitlin De Guzman; Philippines
Floor	Farah Ann Abdul Hadi; Malaysia	Kaitlin De Guzman; Philippines	Rifda Irfanaluthfi; Indonesia

=== Rhythmic ===
Event	Gold	Silver	Bronze
Team all-around	Malaysia; Amy Kwan Dict Weng; Chong Lok Yi; Izzah Amzan; Sie Yan Koi	Thailand; Manatsanan Chaiteerapattarapong; Panjarat Prawatyotin; Pornchanit Junthabud; Thanyaphat Sungvornyothin	Singapore; Edlyn Ho Zen Yee; Phebe Meredith Lau Zhi Ling; Avryl Tan Ying; Tong Kah Mun
Individual all-around	Sie Yan Koi; Malaysia	Amy Kwan Dict Weng; Malaysia	Tong Kah Mun; Singapore
5 Hoops	Malaysia; Amira Sofiya Amirul Fares; Chan Mei Thung; Koh Jei Yi; Tee Wei Qi; Tee Wei Wen; Thew Yue Jia	Singapore; Edlyn Ho Zen Yee; Jael Chew; Michele Petrova Lau Xin Ling; Phebe Meredith Lau Zhi Ling; Avryl Tan Ying	Philippines; AJ Melgar; Jean Caluscusin; Katrina Drilon Loretizo; Marian Nicolle Medina; Shieldannah Sabio
3 Balls + 2 Ropes	Malaysia; Amira Sofiya Amirul Fares; Chan Mei Thung; Koh Jei Yi; Tee Wei Qi; Tee Wei Wen; Thew Yue Jia	Vietnam; Lê Việt Trinh; Nguyễn Hồng Nhung; Phạm Nguyễn Vân Nhi; Trịnh Hương Giang; Trương Mai Nhật Linh	Singapore; Edlyn Ho Zen Yee; Jael Chew; Michele Petrova Lau Xin Ling; Phebe Meredith Lau Zhi Ling; Avryl Tan Ying
Hoop	Sie Yan Koi; Malaysia	Amy Kwan Dict Weng; Malaysia	Panjarat Prawatyotin; Thailand
Hoop	Sie Yan Koi; Malaysia	Amy Kwan Dict Weng; Malaysia	Nabila Evandestiera; Indonesia
Ball	Izzah Amzan; Malaysia	Sie Yan Koi; Malaysia	Nabila Evandestiera; Indonesia
Clubs	Sie Yan Koi; Malaysia	Izzah Amzan; Malaysia	Thanyaphat Sungvornyothin; Thailand
Ribbon	Amy Kwan Dict Weng; Malaysia	Sie Yan Koi; Malaysia	Panjarat Prawatyotin; Thailand
