= Gymnastics at the 2018 Commonwealth Games – Men's vault =

Men's vault at the 2018 Commonwealth Games
- Venue: Coomera Indoor Sports Centre
- Dates: 5 April 2018 (qualification); 9 April 2018 (final)
- Competitors: 8 from 5 nations
- Winning score: 14.799

Medalists
gold medal	Christopher Remkes	Australia
silver medal	Courtney Tulloch	England
bronze medal	Dominick Cunningham	England

The Men's vault gymnastics competition at the 2018 Commonwealth Games in Gold Coast, Australia was held on 9 April 2018 at the Coomera Indoor Sports Centre.

== Schedule ==
The schedule is as follows:

All times are Australian Eastern Standard Time (UTC+10:00)

Date	Time	Round
Thursday 5 April 2018	09:08	Qualification
Sunday 9 April 2018	14:33	Final

== Results ==
=== Qualification ===
Qualification for this apparatus final was determined within the team final.

=== Final ===
The results are as follows:

Rank	Name	D Score	E Score	Pen.	Score 1	D Score	E Score	Pen.	Score 2	Total
Rank	Name	Vault 1				Vault 2				Total
1st place, gold medalist(s)	Christopher Remkes (AUS)	5.600	9.266		14.866	5.600	9.133		14.733	14.799
2nd place, silver medalist(s)	Courtney Tulloch (ENG)	5.600	8.733		14.333	5.600	9.400		15.000	14.666
3rd place, bronze medalist(s)	Dominick Cunningham (ENG)	5.400	9.166	0.300	14.266	5.600	9.100	0.300	14.400	14.333
4	René Cournoyer (CAN)	5.200	9.300		14.500	4.800	9.166		13.966	14.233
5	Scott Morgan (CAN)	5.200	9.000		14.200	4.800	9.133		13.933	14.066
6	Marios Georgiou (CYP)	4.800	9.500		14.300	4.400	9.166		13.566	13.933
7	Kyleab Ellis (NZL)	4.800	9.166		13.966	5.000	8.900		13.900	13.933
8	Neofytos Kyriakou (CYP)	4.800	9.033		13.833	4.400	9.200		13.600	13.716
