= Gymnastics at the 2018 Commonwealth Games – Men's rings =

Men's rings at the 2018 Commonwealth Games
- Venue: Coomera Indoor Sports Centre
- Dates: 5 April 2018 (qualification); 8 April 2018 (final)
- Competitors: 8 from 6 nations
- Winning score: 14.833

Medalists
gold medal	Courtney Tulloch	England
silver medal	Nile Wilson	England
bronze medal	Scott Morgan	Canada

The Men's rings gymnastics competition at the 2018 Commonwealth Games in Gold Coast, Australia was held on 8 April 2018 at the Coomera Indoor Sports Centre.

== Schedule ==
The schedule is as follows:

All times are Australian Eastern Standard Time (UTC+10:00)

Date	Time	Round
Thursday 5 April 2018	09:08	Qualification
Saturday 8 April 2018	16:46	Final

== Results ==
=== Qualification ===
Qualification for this apparatus final was determined within the team final.

=== Final ===
The results are as follows:

Rank	Gymnast	Difficulty	Execution	Penalty	Total
1st place, gold medalist(s)	Courtney Tulloch (ENG)	6.400	8.433		14.833
2nd place, silver medalist(s)	Nile Wilson (ENG)	5.900	8.500		14.400
3rd place, bronze medalist(s)	Scott Morgan (CAN)	6.000	8.000		14.000
4	René Cournoyer (CAN)	5.400	8.500		13.900
5	Marios Georgiou (CYP)	5.000	8.766		13.766
6	Devy Dyson (NZL)	5.400	8.133		13.533
7	Daniel Purvis (SCO)	5.400	7.833		13.233
8	Rakesh Patra (IND)	5.900	7.033		12.933
