= Alexandra Kiroi-Bogatyreva =

Australian rhythmic gymnast of Russian origin

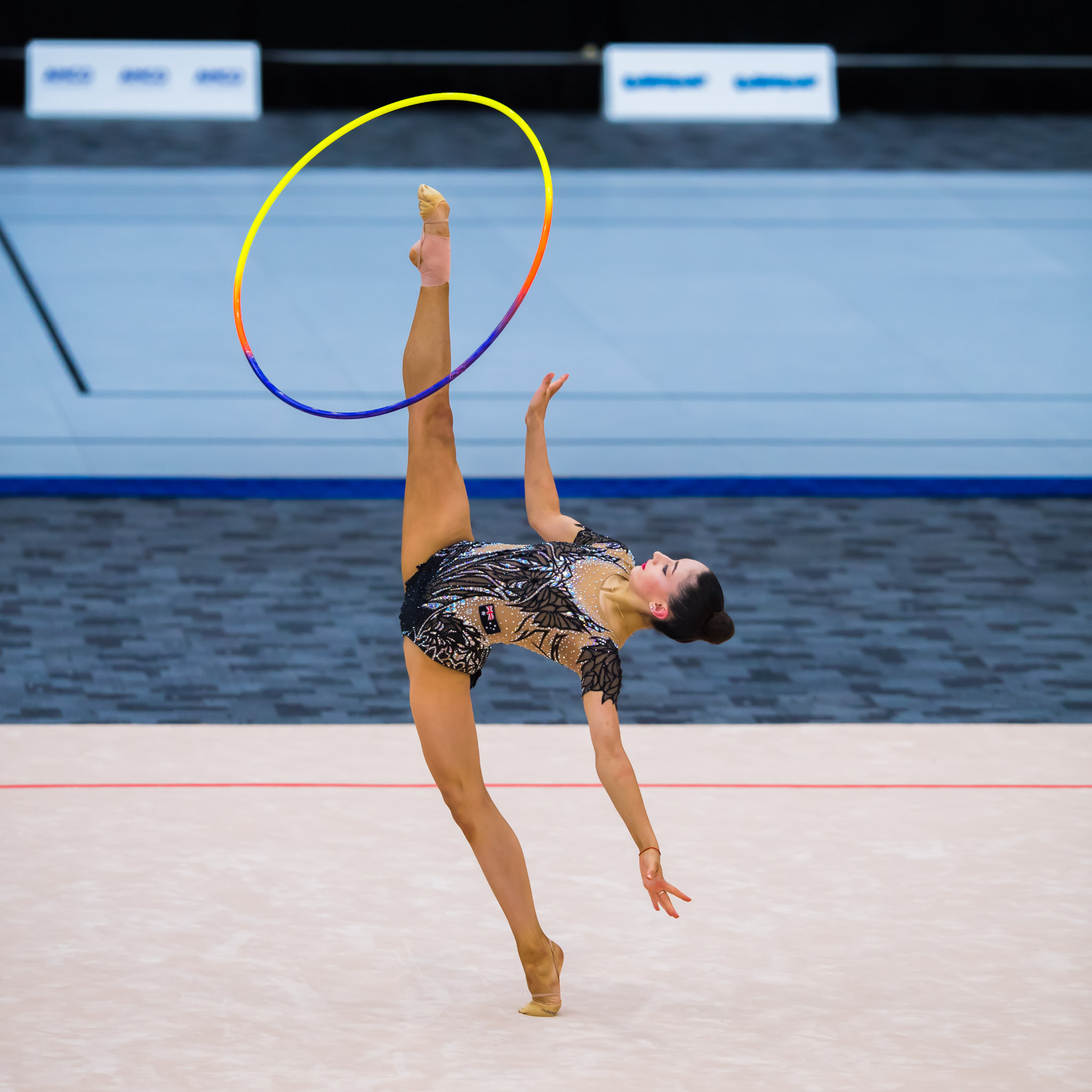
- Kiroi-Bogatyreva at the 2022 Oceania Championships

Personal information
- Nicknames: Alex, Sasha
- Born: 4 March 2002 (age 24) Wellington, New Zealand
- Height: 165 cm (5 ft 5 in)

Gymnastics career
- Discipline: Rhythmic gymnastics
- Country represented: Australia; (2015–2024)
- Training location: Baku, Azerbaijan
- Club: Le Ray Gymnastics Academy
- Head coach: Katie Mitchell
Medal record
Rhythmic gymnastics
Representing Australia
Oceanian Championships
Gold medal – first place	2024 Budapest	All-Around
Commonwealth Games
Gold medal – first place	2022 Birmingham	Clubs
Silver medal – second place	2022 Birmingham	Team
Bronze medal – third place	2018 Gold Coast	Team
Bronze medal – third place	2018 Gold Coast	Ball
Bronze medal – third place	2022 Birmingham	All-around
Maccabiah Games
Bronze medal – third place	2022 Israel	All-around
Bronze medal – third place	2022 Israel	Hoop
Bronze medal – third place	2022 Israel	Ball
Bronze medal – third place	2022 Israel	Clubs
Bronze medal – third place	2022 Israel	Ribbon

Alexandra Kiroi-Bogatyreva (born 4 March 2002) is an Australian former rhythmic gymnast. She is the 2022 Commonwealth Games clubs champion, team silver medallist, and all-around bronze medallist. She also won two bronze medals at the 2018 Commonwealth Games. She is a four-time Australian all-around champion (2018, 2019, 2022, and 2023). She won five bronze medals at the 2022 Maccabiah Games and has competed at the Rhythmic Gymnastics World Championships five times (2018, 2019, 2021, 2022, and 2023).

Kiroi-Bogatyreva won the all-around title at the 2024 Oceania Championships and thus qualified to represent Australia at the 2024 Summer Olympics. She finished 22nd in the qualification round for the individual all-around.

== Early life ==
Alexandra Kiroi-Bogatyreva was born on 4 March 2002 in Wellington, New Zealand, and raised in Melbourne, Australia. Her mother Valeriya was a dancesport competitor, competing in ballroom and Latin dance for 15 years. Both of her parents emigrated from the former Soviet Union in the early 1990s. She attended The King David School in Armadale, and she is Jewish.

== Junior career ==
She started gymnastics and ballet at the age of two and shifted to practicing rhythmic gymnastics at the age of six at Prahran Rhythmic Gymnastics Specialist Centre in Windsor, an inner South-Eastern suburb of Melbourne.

Kiroi-Bogatyreva's first Australian Championships was in 2012, and she finished fourth in the all-around among the level 7 juniors. She first competed internationally in 2013, marking her debut with an all-around gold medal at the Vitri Cup in Spain. She won four gold medals and one silver medal in the all-around in the 2013 level 7 Australian Championships. She also finished second in the all-around as a level 8 at the 2014 Australian Championships. She won the national all-around title for level 9 juniors in 2015.

Kiroi-Bogatyreva delayed the start of her 2016 season due to an injury, but she returned to competition at the AEON Cup in Tokyo, Japan, and placed 11th with the hoop. After the competition, she spent five months training in Moscow, Russia. She then took second place in the all-around at the Stelle di Natale in Italy. She finished fifth in the all-around at the 2016 Australian Championships in the junior division.

Kiroi-Bogatyreva placed 11th in the all-around at the 2017 Aphrodite Cup, and at the Holon Grand Prix, she finished 12th out of the 44 competitors in the all-around. She finished second in the all-around at the 2017 Australian Championships and became the junior national champion in clubs. In December 2017, she competed at the Luxembourg Cup in the open division, winning the all-around title despite still being a junior.

== Senior career ==
=== 2018 ===
Kiroi-Bogatyreva became eligible to compete as an international senior in 2018. She won the all-around bronze medal at the Australia Cup and was selected to represent Australia at the 2018 Commonwealth Games alongside Danielle Prince and Enid Sung. The team won the bronze medal behind Malaysia and Cyprus. Kiroi-Bogatyreva qualified for the individual all-around final and finished in 10th place. Then in the ball final, she won another bronze medal. She also qualified for the ribbon final where she finished fifth.

After the Commonwealth Games, Kiroi-Bogatyreva made her FIG World Cup debut in Baku, placing 29th in the all-around. She then finished 33rd in the all-around at the Guadalajara World Challenge Cup. One week later at the Portimão World Challenge Cup, she placed 22nd in the all-around. At the Australian Championships, she won her first senior national title. She also won gold medals with the Victorian state team and with the hoop, ball, and ribbon. In September, Kiroi-Bogatyreva represented Australia at the World Championships in Sofia, Bulgaria. She finished 76th in the all-around during the qualification round.

=== 2019 ===
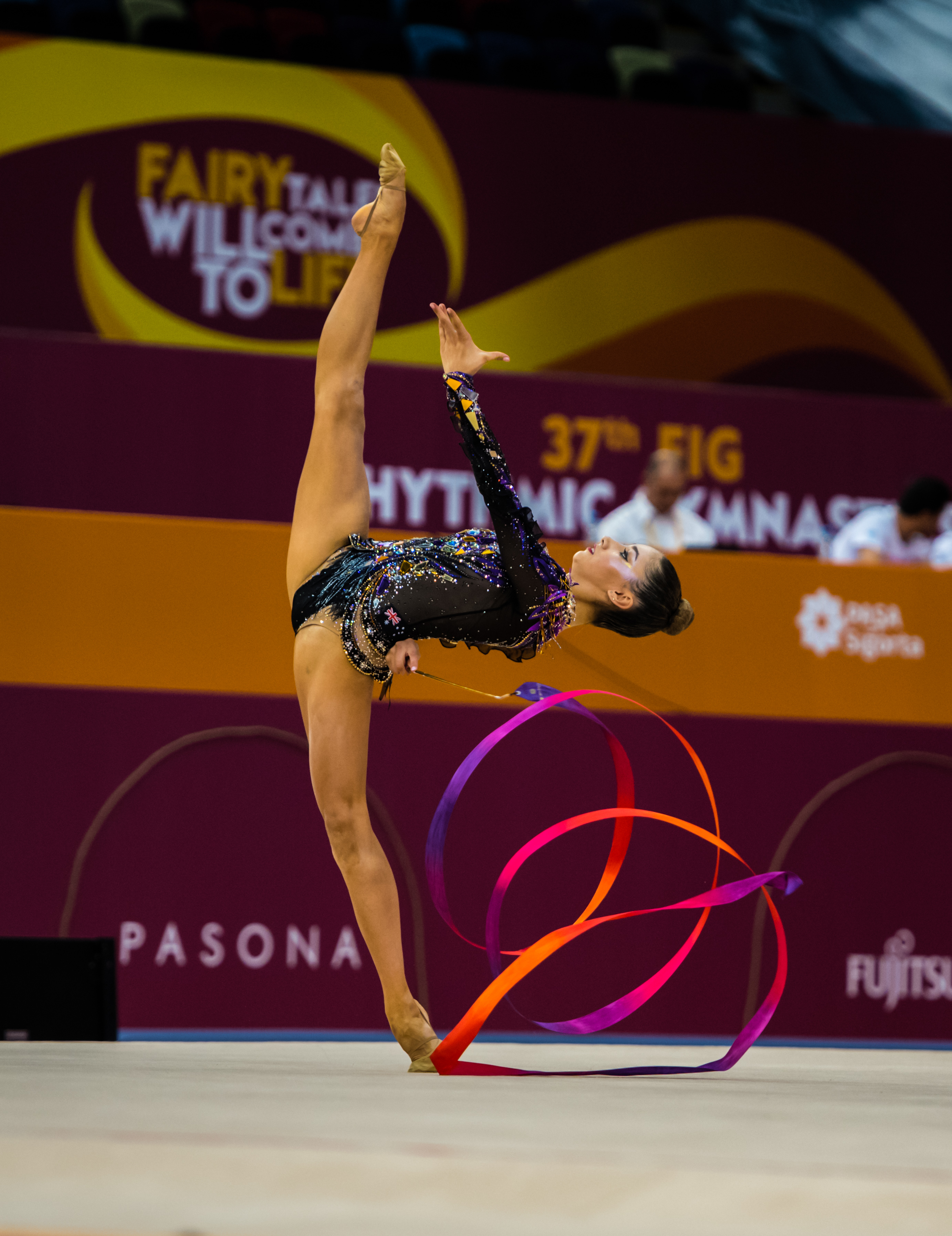
Kiroi-Bogatyreva at the 2019 World Championships

Kiroi-Bogatyreva began the 2019 season by competing in three competitions on the FIG World Cup series. In Sofia, she placed 47th in the all-around, in Tashkent she placed 24th, and in Baku she placed 55th. At the Australian Championships, she successfully defended her national title, winning all five individual gold medals and leading the Victoria state team to a team gold.

At the end of August, Kiroi-Bogatyreva competed at the Kazan World Challenge Cup and finished 42nd in the all-around. She once again represented Australia at the World Championships in Baku, Azerbaijan. She finished 60th in the all-around during the qualification round. As the highest-finishing gymnast from Oceania, she qualified for the 2021 World Games.

=== 2020 ===
In 2020, Kiroi-Bogatyreva competed at the Berlin Masters Tournament and finished fourth in the all-around. In the event finals, she won a gold medal with the clubs, a silver medal with the ball, and a bronze medal with the hoop. The 2020 season was interrupted by the COVID-19 pandemic in March, and Kiroi-Bogatyreva spent nearly a year training in her house.

=== 2021 ===
Kiroi-Bogatryeva competed at the 2021 Oceania Championships, which doubled as the Australian Championships and was an Olympic qualifier. She finished in second-place behind Lidiia Iakovleva and did not receive the sole Olympic berth for Oceania. During the all-around event, Iakovleva appealed her ribbon score, and her score was increased on review by 1.9 points which put her first overall ahead of Kiroi-Bogatyreva. Kiroi-Bogatyreva appealed the competition results to the International Gymnastics Federation (FIG). The FIG Rhythmic Gymnastics Technical Commission requested a re-judging of the competition based on the video footage, but the results upheld the placements of Iakovleva first and Kiroi-Bogatyreva second. Kiroi-Bogatyreva further appealed the re-judged result to the Court of Arbitration for Sport, but her appeal was dismissed on the grounds of "Field of Play". (Note: The Court of Arbitration for Sport will not rule on decisions made by judges or referees during a sporting event ("Field of Play") unless there is substantial evidence of officials acting in bad faith.) However, the Gymnastics Ethics Foundation's investigation found issues with the makeup of the judging panel and procedures at the competition, and the Oceania Gymnastics Union, Gymnastics Australia, and competition officials were sanctioned as a result.

After missing the Olympic spot, Kiroi-Bogatyreva moved to Baku, Azerbaijan, to train at the National Gymnastics Arena. Early in October, she returned to competition at the Cluj-Napoca World Challenge Cup and placed 14th in the all-around. She was then selected to compete World Championships in Kitakyushu, Japan, and Kiroi-Bogatyreva finished 36th in the all-around during the qualification round. She was the highest-placing gymnast from the Commonwealth of Nations.

=== 2022 ===
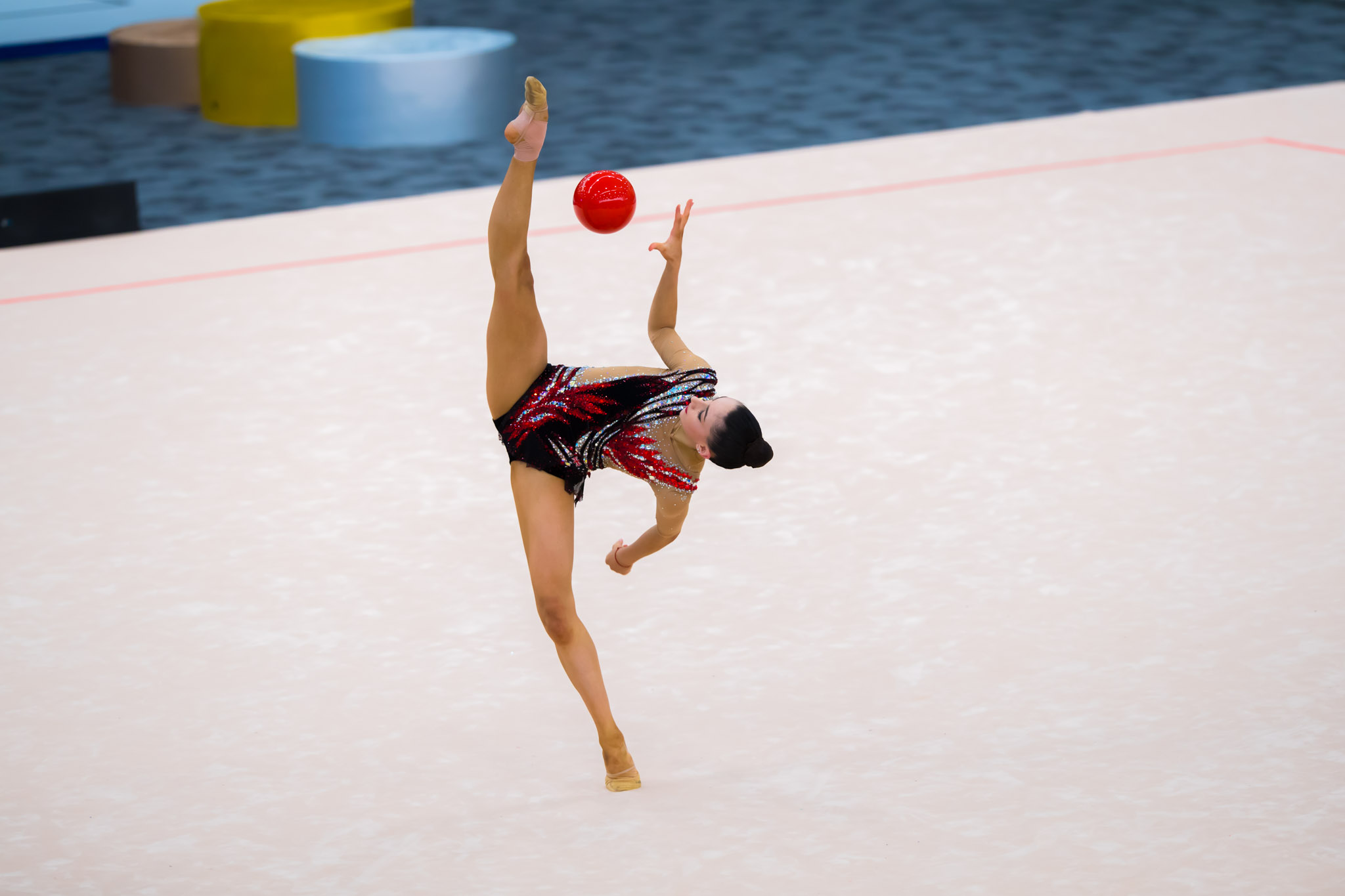
Kiroi-Bogatryreva performs a side balance with her ball at the 2022 Oceania Championships

Kiroi-Bogatyreva began the 2022 season at the Tashkent World Cup where she placed 12th in the all-around. Then at the Baku World Cup, she finished 24th in the all-around. At the Australian Championship, Kiroi-Bogatyreva regained the individual all-around national title, while adding two more individual apparatus national titles and a team gold medal.

After successfully qualifying for the World Games in 2019, Kiroi-Bogatyreva took part in the event, hosted in Birmingham, Alabama. She finished 20th in hoop, 12th in ball, 14th in ribbon, and 15th in clubs. She then competed at the 2022 Maccabiah Games, becoming the first Australian rhythmic gymnast to compete at the event, and won five bronze medals. She was selected to represent Australia at the 2022 Commonwealth Games alongside Lidiia Iakovleva and Ashari Gill. The team won the silver medal behind Canada. Individually, Kiroi-Bogatyreva qualified for the all-around final and won the bronze medal behind England's Marfa Ekimova and Cypriot Anna Sokolova. She then won her first Commonwealth Games gold medal in the clubs final.

Kiroi-Bogatyreva concluded her 2022 season by taking part in the World Championships in Sofia, Bulgaria. She placed 30th in the all-around during the qualification round.

=== 2023 ===
In April, Kiroi-Bogatyreva took part in the Thais Grand Prix and finished 10th in the all-around. She also finished seventh in the hoop final and eighth in the ribbon final. Then in May, she defended her all-around national championship title for the fourth time. At the first competition of the FIG World Cup series held in Sofia, she finished 32nd in the all-around. She then finished 29th at the Baku World Cup. She was the only Australian individual representative selected for the World Championship, held in Valencia, Spain. She finished 37th all-around in the qualification round.

=== 2024 ===
Kiroi-Bogatyreva placed 14th in the all-around at the Marbella Grand Prix, and she finished ninth all-around at the Gymnastik International. She then placed 32nd in the all-around at the 2024 Faliro World Cup. She was the only non-European to compete at the inaugural European Cup, and she came in tenth place.

In May, Kiroi-Bogatyreva competed at 2024 European Championships in Budapest, Hungary, which also doubled as the 2024 Oceania Championships. She won the all-around title and thus claimed the Oceania continental qualification berth for Paris 2024. On 18 June, she was officially announced as Australian Olympic Team member. At the 2024 Summer Olympics, she finished 22nd in the qualification round for the individual all-around.

Kiroi-Bogatyreva announced her retirement from competition in February 2025. She said that she planned to remain connected to gymnastics through coaching and that she was pursuing a career in sports law.

== Personal life ==
Since 2021, Kiroi-Bogatyreva has been studying for a law degree at Monash University. She attends her classes remotely and is planning to work in sports law after graduation. She is involved with the Gymnastics Ethics Foundation.

== Post competitive career ==
In May 2025, Sports Integrity Australia (SIA) announced that gymnast Alexandra Kiroi-Bogatyreva has joined their Athlete Advisory Group together with other 5 prominent Australian athletes. The group will use their experiences and perspectives to ensure the policies and operations of SIA are informed by those who are directly impacted.

In August 2025 a new rhythmic gymnastics club, Kiroi Academy, was founded by Kiroi-Bogatyreva in Melbourne, Australia.

== Competitive history ==
Competitive history of Alexandra Kiroi-Bogatyreva at the junior level
Year	Event	Team	AA	HP	BA	CL	RP
2012	Australian Championships	2nd place, silver medalist(s)	4	4	1st place, gold medalist(s)	3rd place, bronze medalist(s)	
2013	Vitri Cup		1st place, gold medalist(s)	1st place, gold medalist(s)		1st place, gold medalist(s)	
2013	Australian Championships	1st place, gold medalist(s)	2nd place, silver medalist(s)	1st place, gold medalist(s)	1st place, gold medalist(s)	1st place, gold medalist(s)	7
Year	Event	Team	AA	HP	BA	CL	RB
2014	Viento del Sol		1st place, gold medalist(s)	1st place, gold medalist(s)		1st place, gold medalist(s)	
2014	Australian Championships	2nd place, silver medalist(s)	2nd place, silver medalist(s)	3rd place, bronze medalist(s)	2nd place, silver medalist(s)	3rd place, bronze medalist(s)	2nd place, silver medalist(s)
Year	Event	Team	AA	HP	BA	CL	RP
2015	LA Lights		19				19
2015	Friendship Cup		3rd place, bronze medalist(s)	4		4	2nd place, silver medalist(s)
2015	Australian Championships	1st place, gold medalist(s)	1st place, gold medalist(s)	2nd place, silver medalist(s)	1st place, gold medalist(s)	1st place, gold medalist(s)	4
2016	AEON Cup		19	11	20	24	19
2016	Stelle di Natale		2nd place, silver medalist(s)	1st place, gold medalist(s)	2nd place, silver medalist(s)	3rd place, bronze medalist(s)	
2016	Australian Championships	2nd place, silver medalist(s)	5	6		5	4
Year	Event	Team	AA	HP	BA	CL	RB
2017	Aphrodite Cup		11			7	
2017	Holon Grand Prix	7	12				
2017	Stelle di Natale		3rd place, bronze medalist(s)	1st place, gold medalist(s)	2nd place, silver medalist(s)	4	
2017	Singapore Open	1st place, gold medalist(s)	4	1st place, gold medalist(s)		2nd place, silver medalist(s)	6
2017	Australian Championships	1st place, gold medalist(s)	2nd place, silver medalist(s)	3rd place, bronze medalist(s)	3rd place, bronze medalist(s)	1st place, gold medalist(s)	5
2017	Luxembourg Cup		1st place, gold medalist(s)	1st place, gold medalist(s)	1st place, gold medalist(s)	1st place, gold medalist(s)	4

Competitive history of Alexandra Kiroi-Bogatyreva at the senior level
Year	Event	Team	AA	HP	BA	CL	RB
2018	Australia Cup	1st place, gold medalist(s)	3rd place, bronze medalist(s)	4	2nd place, silver medalist(s)	3rd place, bronze medalist(s)	1st place, gold medalist(s)
2018	Commonwealth Games	3rd place, bronze medalist(s)	10		3rd place, bronze medalist(s)		5
2018	Baku World Cup		29				
2018	Guadalajara World Challenge Cup		33				
2018	Portimão World Challenge Cup		22				
2018	Australian Championships	1st place, gold medalist(s)	1st place, gold medalist(s)	1st place, gold medalist(s)	1st place, gold medalist(s)	2nd place, silver medalist(s)	1st place, gold medalist(s)
2018	World Championships		76				
2019	Sofia World Cup		47				
2019	Tashkent World Cup		24				
2019	Baku World Cup		55				
2019	Australian Championships	1st place, gold medalist(s)	1st place, gold medalist(s)	1st place, gold medalist(s)	1st place, gold medalist(s)	1st place, gold medalist(s)	1st place, gold medalist(s)
2019	Kazan World Challenge Cup		42				
2019	World Championships		60				
2019	Stelle di Natale		1st place, gold medalist(s)	1st place, gold medalist(s)	1st place, gold medalist(s)	2nd place, silver medalist(s)	
2020	Berlin Masters Tournament		4	3rd place, bronze medalist(s)	2nd place, silver medalist(s)	1st place, gold medalist(s)	
2021	Oceania Championships		2nd place, silver medalist(s)				
2021	Cluj-Napoca World Challenge Cup		14				
2021	World Championships		36				
2022	Tashkent World Cup		12				
2022	Baku World Cup		24				
2022	Australian Championships	1st place, gold medalist(s)	1st place, gold medalist(s)	1st place, gold medalist(s)	3rd place, bronze medalist(s)	1st place, gold medalist(s)	2nd place, silver medalist(s)
2022	Oceania Championships	1st place, gold medalist(s)					
2022	World Games			20	12	15	14
2022	Maccabiah Games		3rd place, bronze medalist(s)	3rd place, bronze medalist(s)	3rd place, bronze medalist(s)	3rd place, bronze medalist(s)	3rd place, bronze medalist(s)
2022	Commonwealth Games	2nd place, silver medalist(s)	3rd place, bronze medalist(s)		5	1st place, gold medalist(s)	5
2022	World Championships		30				
2023	Thais Grand Prix		10	7			8
2023	Australian Championships	1st place, gold medalist(s)	1st place, gold medalist(s)				
2023	Oceania Championships	2nd place, silver medalist(s)					
2023	Sofia World Cup		32				
2023	Baku World Cup		29				
2023	World Championships		37				
2024	Marbella Grand Prix		14				
2024	Gymnastik International		9				
2024	Sofia Cup International Tournament		11				6
2024	Athens World Cup		32				
2024	European Cup		10				
2024	Oceania Championships		1st place, gold medalist(s)				
2024	Olympic Games		22				

== Awards and accolades ==
Overview of Alexandra Kiroi-Bogatyreva's awards
Year	Awarder	Award	Ref.
2014	Gymnastics Victoria	Rising Star Award	
2014	Maccabi Victoria	Junior Sportswoman of the Year	
2014	Maccabi Australia	Junior Sportswoman of the Year	
2015	Maccabi Victoria	Rising Star of the Year	
2016	Gymnastics Victoria	High Performance Gymnast of the Year	
2016	Maccabi Victoria	Junior Sportswoman of the Year	
2016	Maccabi Australia	Junior Sportswoman of the Year	
2017	AMP Foundation	Tomorrow Maker Grant	
2017	Maccabi Victoria	Jewish Junior Sportswoman of the Year	
2017	Maccabi Australia	Junior Sportswoman of the Year	
2018	Gymnastics Australia	Senior International Gymnast of the Year	
2018	Gymnastics Australia	Athlete Award of Distinction	
2018	Maccabi Australia	Junior Sportswoman of the Year	
2019	Gymnastics Australia	Senior International Gymnast of the Year	
2019	Gymnastics Victoria	High Performance Gymnast of the Year	
2019	Maccabi Australia	Junior Sportswoman of the Year	
2022	Monarch of Australia	Australian Sport Medal	
2022	Gymnastics Australia	Senior International Gymnast of the Year	
2022	Gymnastics Victoria	High Performance Gymnast of the Year	
2022	Maccabi Victoria	Hall of Fame Inductee	
2022	Maccabi Australia	President's Award	
2022	Vicsport "Rebel"	Young Athlete of the Year	
2023	Sport Australia Hall of Fame	Tier 2 scholarship recipient	
2023	Gymnastics Australia	Senior International Gymnast of the Year	
2023	Gymnastics New South Wales	Senior International Athlete of the Year	
2024	Gymnastics Australia	Athlete Roll of Honour	
2024	Victorian Institute of Sport	Scholarship recipient	
2024	Gymnastics New South Wales	Senior International Athlete of the Year	

== See also ==
- List of select Jewish gymnasts
- List of Commonwealth Games medallists in gymnastics
