= Enid Sung =

Australian rhythmic gymnast

- Nickname: Juju
- Born: 26 August 1994 (age 32) Kogarah, New South Wales, Australia
- Height: 172 cm (5 ft 8 in)

Gymnastics career
- Discipline: Rhythmic gymnastics
- Country represented: Australia
- Club: Le Ray Gymnastics Academy
- Head coach: Danielle Le Ray
- Retired: 1 February 2019
Medal record
Representing Australia
Commonwealth Games
Bronze medal – third place	2018 Gold Coast	Team

Enid Sung (born 26 August 1994) is an Australian former rhythmic gymnast. She is the 2018 Commonwealth Games bronze medalist with the team. She also competed at the 2010 World Championships.

== Personal life ==
Sung was born on 26 August 1994 in Kogarah, New South Wales. She studied media and communications at the University of Sydney. She speaks both Korean and English.

== Career ==
Sung began gymnastics when she was twelve years old. She was coached by 2000 Olympian Danielle Le Ray.

Sung made her international debut at the 2009 Australian Youth Olympic Festival and helped the Australian team win the silver medal behind China. Individually, she won the bronze medal in the all-around. At the 2010 Pacific Rim Championships, she finished ninth in the all-around. She competed at the 2010 World Championships and helped Australia finish nineteenth in the team competition.

Sung was not able to compete for a spot at the 2016 Olympic Games due to a shoulder injury, and although she had retired, she decided to return in 2017 to compete at the 2018 Commonwealth Games. At the 2018 Australia Cup, she won the silver medal in the all-around and was selected to represent Australia at the 2018 Commonwealth Games. She competed alongside Danielle Prince and Alexandra Kiroi-Bogatyreva and won the bronze medal in the team competition. Sung qualified for the all-around final and finished fourth. She also finished fourth in the hoop final, sixth in the ribbon final, and eighth in the clubs final.

Sung retired from competition on 1 February 2019.
