= Gymnastics at the 2015 SEA Games – Women's rhythmic individual all-around =

Gymnastics – Women's rhythmic individual all-around at the 2015 SEA Games
- Venue: Bishan Sports Hall
- Date: 14 June 2015
- Competitors: 10 from 5 nations

Medalists
gold medal	Sie Yan Koi	Malaysia
gold medal	Shasangari Sivaneswari Nagarajan	Malaysia
bronze medal	Panjarat Prawatyotin	Thailand

The Women's rhythmic individual all-around competition at the 2015 SEA Games was held on 14 June 2015 at the Bishan Sports Hall in Singapore.

== Schedule ==
All times are Singapore Standard Time (UTC+8).

Date	Time	Event
Sunday, 14 June 2015	11:00	Final

== Results ==
Source: Results - Women's rhythmic individual all-around

Rank	Athlete	Hoop (rhythmic gymnastics)	Ball (rhythmic gymnastics)	Clubs (rhythmic gymnastics)	Ribbon (rhythmic gymnastics)	Total
1st place, gold medalist(s)	Sie Yan Koi (MAS)	15.450	15.550	15.650	13.600	60.250
1st place, gold medalist(s)	Shasangari Sivaneswari Nagarajan (MAS)	14.700	14.450	15.700	15.400	60.250
3rd place, bronze medalist(s)	Panjarat Prawatyotin (THA)	13.550	14.100	15.150	14.550	57.350
4	Anyavarin Supateeralert (THA)	13.450	14.550	14.600	14.650	57.250
5	Tong Kah Mun (SIN)	13.950	13.000	14.950	15.300	57.200
6	Daphne Chia (SIN)	14.000	13.350	13.900	12.900	54.150
7	Trương Mai Nhật Linh (VIE)	11.900	12.850	13.300	13.350	51.400
8	Nabila Evandestiera (INA)	12.250	11.550	12.900	13.150	49.850
9	Dinda Defriana (INA)	11.250	12.400	11.700	12.100	47.450
10	Tran Thi Thanh Thanh (VIE)	9.700	10.200	9.700	9.800	39.400
