= Gymnastics at the 2018 Commonwealth Games – Men's artistic individual all-around =

Men's artistic individual all-around at the 2018 Commonwealth Games
- Venue: Coomera Indoor Sports Centre
- Dates: 5 April 2018 (qualification); 7 April 2018 (final)
- Winning score: 84.950

Medalists
gold medal	Nile Wilson	England
silver medal	James Hall	England
bronze medal	Marios Georgiou	Cyprus

The Men's artistic individual all-around gymnastics competition at the 2018 Commonwealth Games in Gold Coast, Australia will be held on 7 April 2018 at the Coomera Indoor Sports Centre.

== Schedule ==
The schedule is as follows:

All times are Australian Eastern Standard Time (UTC+10:00)

Date	Time	Round
Thursday 5 April 2018	09:08	Qualification
Saturday 7 April 2018	09:09	Final

== Results ==
=== Qualification ===
Qualification for this all-around final was determined within the team final.

=== Final ===
The results are as follows:

Position	Gymnast	Floor (gymnastics)	Pommel horse	Rings (gymnastics)	Vault (gymnastics)	Parallel bars	Horizontal bar	Total
1st place, gold medalist(s)	Nile Wilson (ENG)	13.800	12.600	14.500	14.350	14.600	15.100	84.950
2nd place, silver medalist(s)	James Hall (ENG)	13.550	13.550	14.200	14.525	14.050	14.100	83.975
3rd place, bronze medalist(s)	Marios Georgiou (CYP)	13.600	14.100	13.950	14.250	13.950	13.900	83.750
4	Frank Baines (SCO)	14.550	13.700	12.750	14.200	14.150	13.200	82.550
5	Michael Mercieca (AUS)	13.100	12.850	13.400	13.750	14.100	14.150	81.350
6	Hamish Carter (SCO)	14.600	11.750	13.250	14.100	13.500	13.850	81.050
7	René Cournoyer (CAN)	12.950	12.750	14.000	14.300	13.300	13.500	80.800
8	Michael Tone (AUS)	12.750	13.850	13.050	13.850	12.850	12.100	78.450
9	Ilias Georgiou (CYP)	13.300	11.600	12.650	13.300	13.950	13.500	78.300
10	Rhys McClenaghan (NIR)	12.050	15.050	12.050	14.000	13.000	12.150	78.300
11	Ethan Dick (NZL)	13.600	12.850	12.700	13.900	12.500	12.400	77.950
12	Daniel Lee (JER)	13.050	12.000	12.800	13.750	12.600	13.050	77.250
13	Josh Cook (WAL)	13.450	12.100	13.050	13.800	12.550	12.200	77.150
14	Yogeshwar Singh (IND)	11.400	12.250	12.600	14.100	13.000	12.250	75.600
15	Mikhail Koudinov (NZL)	12.200	12.850	13.000	13.600	11.950	11.600	75.200
16	Reiss Beckford (JAM)	11.400	12.775	13.450	13.450	12.600	11.000	74.675
17	Loo Phay Xing (MAS)	11.400	12.600	11.700	13.400	11.900	12.250	73.250
18	Ewan McAteer (NIR) (Note: Competing as first reserve in lieu of Clinton Purnell of Wales, who withdrew due to illness.)	11.900	10.700	10.300	14.000	12.850	11.950	71.700
