= Mimi-Isabella Cesar =

British rhythmic gymnast (born 1995)

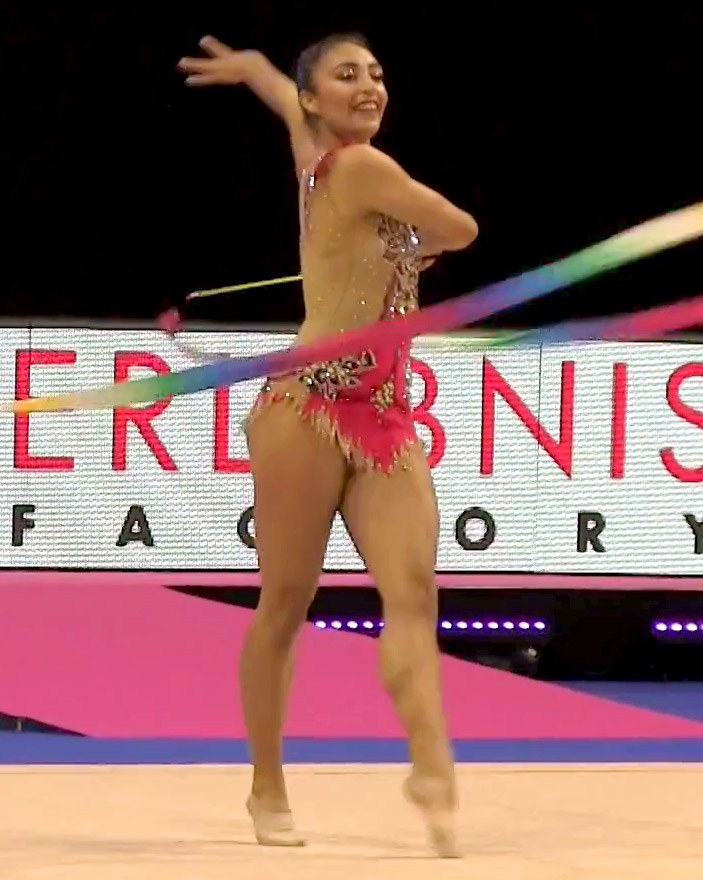
- Cesar in 2017

Personal information
- Full name: Mimi-Isabella Cesar
- Born: 28 January 1995 (age 31) Birmingham, England

Gymnastics career
- Discipline: Rhythmic gymnastics
- Country represented: England; Great Britain (2011–2018)
- Last updated on: 9 December 2020.

Mimi-Isabella Cesar (born 28 January 1995) is a British individual rhythmic gymnast who has represented England and Great Britain at international competitions. She competed at two Commonwealth Games (2014, 2018).

== Career highlights ==
Cesar originally began training in artistic gymnastics when she was three and later switched to rhythmic in 2010 after being inspired by seeing the sport. She was the British junior champion in 2010 and won five bronze medals at the senior championships in 2011.

Cesar made her international debut for Great Britain at the 2011 World Rhythmic Gymnastics Championships in Montpellier, France, finishing 112th in the individual all-around competition. She was a reserve for the 2012 Summer Olympics in London. Although she did not compete, she and the other reserves participated in the testing event prior to the competition.

She suffered an ankle fracture in 2013 but recovered in time for 2014 Commonwealth Games in Glasgow in July, where she and her teammates Stephani Sherlock and Lynne Hutchison finished fourth in the team all-around event. Two months later, she competed at the 2014 Rhythmic Gymnastics World Championships in İzmir, Turkey and finished 22nd in the team event.

Cesar placed 28th at the FIG Berlin Masters World Challenge Cup event in July 2017. In August, she competed at the 2017 Summer Universiade in Taipei, which she later said was one of her favorite moments in competition.

She contested her second Commonwealth Games in 2018, where she and her teammates Sherlock and Hannah Martin placed 6th in the team event. She took a break to rest and then resumed competing. During the COVID-19 lockdowns, she ran online classes for other rhythmic gymnasts.

Cesar failed to reach a third Commonwealth Games in her home city of Birmingham in 2022. She accused British Gymnastics of ageism, saying that they considered her to be too old for the sport at 25 and had made negative remarks about her weight and body. Her accusations came out shortly after the publication of the Whyte Review, a review that revealed systemic abuse in British gymnastics. Cesar said that she was unsurprised by the findings and that she had "very few happy memories" of her gymnastics career.

== Personal life ==
Cesar attended Bishop Walsh Catholic School in Sutton Coldfield and in 2017, graduated from the University of Wolverhampton with a Bachelor in Sports Studies. She formerly taught physical education at Castle Bromwich Infant School but left her position to train for the 2018 Commonwealth Games. She now runs her own gym in Birmingham.
