= Gymnastics at the 2018 Commonwealth Games – Men's horizontal bar =

Men's horizontal bar at the 2018 Commonwealth Games
- Venue: Coomera Indoor Sports Centre
- Dates: 5 April 2018 (qualification); 9 April 2018 (final)
- Winning score: 14.533

Medalists
gold medal	Nile Wilson	England
silver medal	Cory Paterson	Canada
silver medal	James Hall	England

The Men's horizontal bar gymnastics competition at the 2018 Commonwealth Games in Gold Coast, Australia was held on 9 April 2018 at the Coomera Indoor Sports Centre.

== Schedule ==
The schedule is as follows:

All times are Australian Eastern Standard Time (UTC+10:00)

Date	Time	Round
Thursday 5 April 2018	09:08	Qualification
Sunday 9 April 2018	16:49	Final

== Results ==
=== Qualification ===
Qualification for this apparatus final was determined within the team final.

=== Final ===
The final began at 16:49 local time.

Rank	Gymnast	Difficulty	Execution	Penalty	Total
1st place, gold medalist(s)	Nile Wilson (ENG)	5.800	8.733		14.533
2nd place, silver medalist(s)	Cory Paterson (CAN)	5.600	8.400		14.000
2nd place, silver medalist(s)	James Hall (ENG)	5.600	8.400		14.000
4	Frank Baines (SCO)	5.100	8.233		13.333
5	Michael Tone (AUS)	4.500	8.233		12.733
6	René Cournoyer (CAN)	5.000	7.666		12.666
7	Ilias Georgiou (CYP)	4.800	7.733		12.533
8	Hamish Carter (SCO)	4.500	6.533		11.033
