= Christopher Remkes =

Australian artistic gymnast (born 1996)

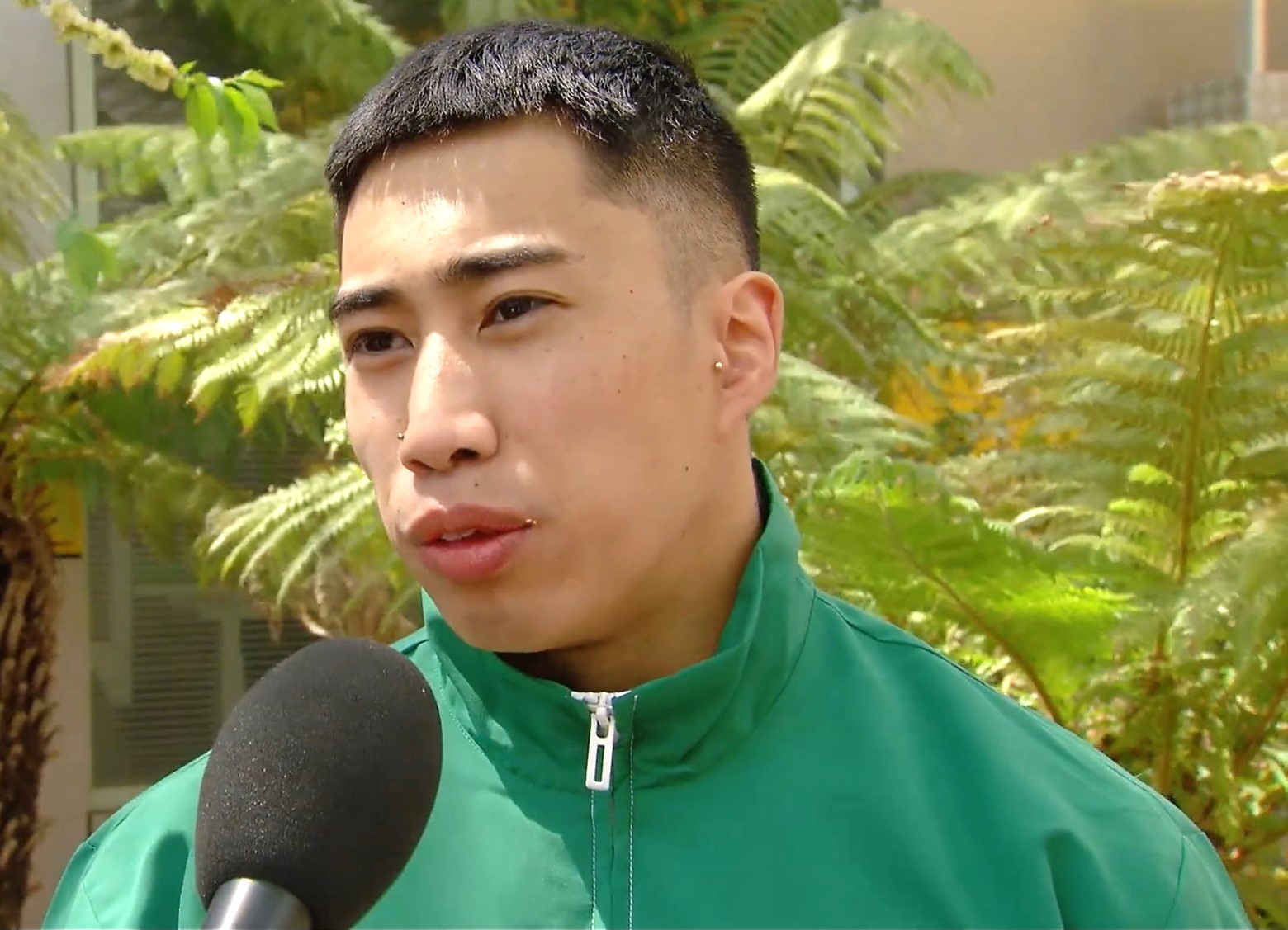
- Remkes in 2018

Personal information
- Born: 3 September 1996 (age 30) Bacolod, Philippines
- Height: 147 cm (4 ft 10 in)

Gymnastics career
- Discipline: Men's artistic gymnastics
- Country represented: Australia
Medal record
Men's artistic gymnastics
Representing Australia
Commonwealth Games
Gold medal – first place	2018 Gold Coast	Vault
FIG World Cup
World Cup Final
Gold medal – first place	2017 Baku	Vault
Gold medal – first place	2018 Melbourne	Vault
Silver medal – second place	2016 Doha	Vault
Silver medal – second place	2017 Melbourne	Vault
Bronze medal – third place	2017 Cottbus	Vault
Bronze medal – third place	2018 Melbourne	Pommel

Christopher Remkes is an Australian gymnast who has competed at the 2018 Commonwealth Games.

== Early life ==
An orphan, Christopher Remkes's date of birth is listed as 3 September 1996. According to the orphanage that took care of him, he was abandoned as a two-day-old in a hospital in Bacolod, Philippines. At two years old, Christopher Remkes was adopted by Mike and Dora Remkes who brought him to Australia.

He spent his childhood in Happy Valley, a suburb of Adelaide and started getting involved in gymnastics at the age of five. He has an adoptive brother and sister who were adopted from Manila. He tried playing other sports but eventually focused on gymnastics. For his primary education, Remkes attended Aberfoyle Park and later Ascot Park, which maintains a specialist gymnastics program. Remkes also went to Hamilton Secondary College before moving to the Australian Institute of Sport in Canberra in 2015.

== Gymnastics career ==
Remkes competed at the 2018 Commonwealth Games in the men's vault event. He managed to win a gold for Australia, ending a 24-year Commonwealth Games drought for his adopted nation in the event since Bret Hudson won a gold in the vault event For Australia at the 1994 Commonwealth Games. After his Commonwealth stint, Remkes has expressed his goal of competing in the 2020 Summer Olympics. However, he tore his ACL at the 2019 World Cup competition in Doha and although he was recovered enough to be on Australia's 2020 World Cup Team, he was not chosen for the Olympics team, which had only one slot for Men's Artistic Gymnastics.
