= Maccabi Australia =

Organization

- Purpose: Sports
- Headquarters: Melbourne, Victoria, Australia
- Region served: Australia and New Zealand
- President: Rodney Rosmarin
- Parent organization: Maccabi World Union
- Affiliations: Zionist Federation of Australia
- Website: www.Maccabi.com.au

Maccabi Australia is a Jewish Australian sporting organisation. It is part of Maccabi World Union. Maccabi teams compete in many sports such as association football, Australian rules football, basketball, table tennis and more. Maccabi Australia is an affiliate of the Zionist Federation of Australia.

== History ==
An Australia-wide Jewish sporting organisation had formed by 1935 under the name the Australian Judean Sports Council. It was affiliated with the Maccabi World Union, and organised Australian Jewish Interstate Sports Carnivals. The council changed its name in 1960 to Australian Maccabi Council and became Maccabi Australia in 1991. Australian teams have attended the World Maccabiah Games since 1933. Four Australian athletes attending the 1997 Maccabiah Games died as a result of a bridge collapse during the opening ceremony. In 2014, Maccabi Australia committed to implementing member protection policies and procedures, particularly for children, as a result of the conviction for child sex offences of a coach employed by Maccabi Australia in the late 1990s.

== Junior Carnival ==
The Maccabi Junior Carnival is an annual Jewish sporting event in which Jewish youth from different Australian states and New Zealand compete against each other.

In 2007 it was held in Melbourne, Victoria, and more than 1000 people participated. Teams from Victoria, New South Wales, Western Australia, Queensland and New Zealand competed.

The 2008 carnival was held in Auckland, New Zealand. It was in January and was the second carnival to be held in New Zealand.

The 2009 carnival was held in Sydney, Australia, in January of that year.

== Maccabi Australia International Games ==
Maccabi Australia International Games were held in Sydney, with the inaugural games held in July 2006, and the second games held in December 2010 – January 2011.

== Executive ==
As of 2024, the current president of Maccabi Australia is Rodney Rosmarin.

== See also ==
Maccabi World Union
