= Anna-Marie Ondaatje =

Canadian-Sri Lankan rhythmic gymnast

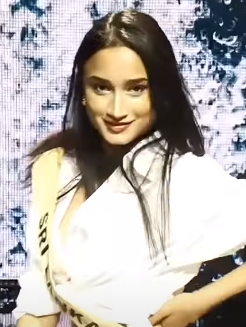
- Anna-Marie Ondaatje in 2021

Personal information
- Full name: Anna-Marie Suzanne Quint Ondaatje
- Born: 1 September 2000 (age 26) Markham, Ontario, Canada

Gymnastics career
- Discipline: Rhythmic gymnastics
- Country represented: Sri Lanka; Canada
- Head coach: Svetlana Joukova
- Former coach: Mimi Masleva

Anna-Marie Suzanne Quint Ondaatje (born 1 September 2000) is a Canadian-born female rhythmic gymnast of Sri Lankan descent. She has competed in national level competitions in Canada; she represented Canada internationally before switching to compete for Sri Lanka. She became the first rhythmic gymnast to represent Sri Lanka at the Commonwealth Games at the 2018 Commonwealth Games, where she was one of just four female gymnasts to represent Sri Lanka.

== Biography ==
Ondaatje was born on 1 September 2000 in Canada to parents of Sri Lankan origin, Alistair Ondaatje and Suzanne Ondaatje, who hailed from the town of Wattala. She has two sisters.

She initially trained in artistic gymnastics, but she began rhythmic gymnastics at the age of nine as her father thought it a more feminine sport.

== Gymnastics career ==
=== Canada (2014–2016) ===
Ondaatje took part in the 2014 Pacific Rim Gymnastics Championships as a member of the junior Canadian group, and she and her teammates finished fourth.

=== Sri Lanka (2017-present) ===
Ondaatje represented Sri Lanka for the first time at the 2017 World Rhythmic Gymnastics Championships, her first senior level competition. She became the first ever gymnast to compete for Sri Lanka at an international rhythmic gymnastics championship. She competed in the individual qualification event and finished in 75th place with 42.400 total points.

She made her Commonwealth Games debut at the 2018 Gold Coast Commonwealth Games. Ahead of the competition, she suffered a stress fracture in her spine. She finished in 11th place out of 16 athletes in the women's individual all-around finals.

Ondaatje also qualified to represent Sri Lanka at the 2018 Asian Games, making her the first gymnast from Sri Lanka to compete at the 2018 Asian Games. She finished 24th in the qualification round.

She competed at the 2022 Commonwealth Games without her coach, as her coach did not receive accreditation in time. There she placed 22nd in the qualification round and was the first reserve for the final. Ondaatje also competed at the 2022 World Championships, where she placed 67th, and the 2023 World Championships, where she placed 74th.

== See also ==
- Nationality changes in gymnastics
