= Amy Kwan =

Malaysian rhythmic gymnast

Amy Kwan Dict Weng
- Full name: Amy Kwan Dict Weng
- Born: 1 February 1995 (age 31) Selangor, Malaysia
- Height: 169 cm (5 ft 7 in)

Gymnastics career
- Discipline: Rhythmic gymnastics
- Country represented: Malaysia
- Former coach: Lidia Legotina
- Choreographer: Ildar Kolesyanov
- Retired: 30 July 2020
Medal record
Rhythmic Gymnastics
Representing Malaysia
Asian Championships
Bronze medal – third place	2018 Kuala Lumpur	Ribbon
Commonwealth Games
Gold medal – first place	2018 Gold Coast	Ribbon
Silver medal – second place	2018 Gold Coast	Team
Bronze medal – third place	2014 Glasgow	Team
Bronze medal – third place	2018 Gold Coast	All-Around
Bronze medal – third place	2018 Gold Coast	Hoop
Southeast Asian Games
Gold medal – first place	2017 Kuala Lumpur	Team
Gold medal – first place	2017 Kuala Lumpur	Ribbon
Silver medal – second place	2017 Kuala Lumpur	All-Around
Silver medal – second place	2017 Kuala Lumpur	Hoop
Bronze medal – third place	2019 Philippines	Hoop

Amy Kwan Dict Weng AKS (born 1 February 1995) is a Malaysian former individual rhythmic gymnast.

== Career ==
She was part of the Malaysian team to win the bronze and silver medals in the women's rhythmic team all-around event at Glasgow 2014 and Gold Coast 2018 Commonwealth Games respectively. At Gold Coast 2018, she bagged five medals, including a gold in individual ribbon event. In the 2017 Southeast Asian Games, she won two golds and two silvers. One of her gold medal is the 100th gold medal for the Malaysia team. Kwan announced her retirement to run a dance studio on 30 July 2020.

== Awards and accolades ==
- 2018 Olympian of the Year Award by Olympic Council of Malaysia
- 2018 National Sportswoman of the Year at the National Sports Awards
- Darjah Kebesaran Ahli Kegemilangan Sukan Selangor (AKS) (2018)
