= Gemma Frizelle =

British rhythmic gymnast (born 1998)

- Full name: Gemma Natasha Frizelle
- Born: 2 May 1998 (age 28) Cardiff, Wales

Gymnastics career
- Discipline: Rhythmic gymnastics
- Club: Llanelli
Medal record
Representing Wales
Commonwealth Games
Gold medal – first place	2022 Birmingham	Hoop

Gemma Natasha Frizelle (born 2 May 1998) is a Welsh rhythmic gymnast, who won the individual hoop event at the 2022 Commonwealth Games. She has won multiple medals at the Welsh and British Rhythmic Gymnastics Championships, and also competed at the 2018 Commonwealth Games.

== Career ==
Frizelle took up rhythmic gymnastics at the age of 12. She trains at Llanelli Rhythmic Gymnastics Academy. She finished second at the 2015 Welsh Rhythmic Gymnastics Championships, as well as the all-around events at the 2016 and 2017 British Rhythmic Gymnastics Championships.

Frizelle competed at the 2018 Commonwealth Games. She finished 15th in the individual all-around competition, and was part of the Welsh team that finished fifth in the team all-around event. At the 2018 Welsh Rhythmic Gymnastics Championships, she won the ball event, and finished third in the clubs, hoop and ribbon events. At the 2019 British Rhythmic Gymnastics Championships, she came third in the all-around event. Frizelle won the all-around event at the 2021 Welsh Rhythmic Gymnastics Championships, and at the 2022 competition, she won the all-around, ball, ribbon, hoop and clubs events. That year, she also finished second in the British Rhythmic Gymnastics Championships hoop event, and third in the ball event.

Frizelle competed at the 2022 Commonwealth Games after recovering from a back injury. She won the individual hoop event, and her winning routine was performed to "Nessun dorma", which is her mother's favourite song. She was the first Welsh women to win the event at a Commonwealth Games. At the Games, Frizelle also finished eighth in the ball event, 13th in the individual all-around event, and was part of the Welsh team that came sixth in the team all-around competition.

== Personal life ==
Frizelle was born in Cardiff, Wales. She studied at Cardiff Metropolitan University, where she obtained an undergraduate degree in sports science, and a master's degree in psychology from Cardiff University.
