= Koi Sie Yan =

Malaysian rhythmic gymnast

- Born: 8 February 1999 (age 27) Pahang, Malaysia

Gymnastics career
- Discipline: Rhythmic gymnastics
- Country represented: Malaysia
- Head coach: Lidia Legotina
- Choreographer: Ildar Kolesyanov
Medal record
Representing Malaysia
Women's Rhythmic gymnastics
Southeast Asian Games
Gold medal – first place	2015 Singapore	Individual all-around
Gold medal – first place	2017 Kuala Lumpur	Team all-around
Gold medal – first place	2017 Kuala Lumpur	Individual all-around
Gold medal – first place	2017 Kuala Lumpur	Individual hoop
Gold medal – first place	2017 Kuala Lumpur	Individual clubs
Gold medal – first place	2019 Philippines	Individual ribbon
Gold medal – first place	2021 Vietnam	Individual all-around
Silver medal – second place	2017 Kuala Lumpur	Individual ribbon
Silver medal – second place	2019 Philippines	Individual clubs
Commonwealth Games
Silver medal – second place	2018 Gold Coast	Team
Silver medal – second place	2018 Gold Coast	Individual Clubs
Silver medal – second place	2018 Gold Coast	Individual Ball
Bronze medal – third place	2018 Gold Coast	Individual Ribbon

Chinese name
- Chinese: 郭雪嫣
- Hanyu Pinyin: Guō Xuěyān

Koi Sie Yan (born 8 February 1999) is a Malaysian rhythmic gymnast.

== Career ==
Koi first competed for Malaysia at an international rhythmic gymnastics championship in 2015 where she represented Malaysia at the 2015 World Rhythmic Gymnastics Championships. Koi also went onto compete at the 2015 Southeast Asian Games and claimed her maiden Southeast Asian Games medal after securing a gold medal in the women's individual all-around event. At the 2017 Southeast Asian Games which was held in her home nation at Kuala Lumpur, she achieved four gold medals and a silver medal in the rhythmic gymnastics events.

She represented Malaysia at the 2018 Commonwealth Games which was her maiden Commonwealth Games appearance and competed in the rhythmic gymnastics discipline. Koi claimed four medals at the 2018 Gold Coast Commonwealth Games including 3 silver medals in the Team, individual ball event and individual clubs event along with a bronze medal in the individual ribbon event.

She was again selected to represented Malaysia at the 2022 Commonwealth Games, ending in 4th in the team event and qualifying for the ribbon final with a score of 25.750.

In December 2023, the Malaysian Gymnastics Federation announced plans to engage Koi and Izzah Amzan as assistant coaches to the national team.
