= Diamanto Evripidou =

Cypriot rhythmic gymnast (born 2000)

- Full name: Diamanto Evripidou
- Born: 30 March 2000 (age 26) Strovolos, Cyprus
- Height: 162 cm (5 ft 4 in)

Gymnastics career
- Discipline: Rhythmic gymnastics
- Country represented: Cyprus
- Club: Diagoras Rhythmic Gymnastics Club
- Head coach: Chrystalleni Trikomiti
Medal record
Women's rhythmic gymnastics
Representing Cyprus
Commonwealth Games
Gold medal – first place	2018 Gold Coast	Team
Gold medal – first place	2018 Gold Coast	All-Around
Gold medal – first place	2018 Gold Coast	Hoop
Gold medal – first place	2018 Gold Coast	Ball
Silver medal – second place	2018 Gold Coast	Ribbon
Bronze medal – third place	2018 Gold Coast	Clubs

Diamanto Evripidou (Greek: Διαμάντω Ευριπίδου; born 30 March 2000) is a Cypriot former individual rhythmic gymnast. She was the 2016 Cyprus national championship and competed at the 2018 Commonwealth Games, where she medaled in every event, including winning the all-around.

== Early life ==
Evripidou's mother was also a rhythmic gymnast, and she took Evripidou to the gym where she worked as a coach when she was a baby. She began training at four years old with her mother, who remained one of her coaches throughout her career.

== Career ==
Evripidou was the national senior champion of Cyprus in 2016.

She broke her right leg in May 2016, which took her five months to recover from, and then broke the left in December 2016 or January 2017. Her left leg was very weak after her cast was removed, and she found the experience mentally difficult. She attributed her frequent injuries to training in a gym with poor temperatures and without a sprung floor as well as overtraining.

Evripidou recovered in time to compete at the 2017 European Championships in Budapest, Hungary, where her best result was place 24th in the ribbon qualifications. Later that year, she competed at the 2017 World Championships in Pesaro, Italy and placed 42nd in the all-around qualification.

She took a year off from secondary school to increase her training time and lived for six weeks in Larnaca at the house of Chrystalleni Trikomiti, her other coach, to prepare for the 2018 Commonwealth Games. The gym there had sprung floors.

At the Games, she won six medals, one in every event: four golds in the team, all-around, hoop and ball events, silver in ribbon and bronze in the clubs event. Evripidou expressed shock at her results, saying, "I came here to win one medal and now I have six." This was the first time Cyprus had won a gold medal in the Commonwealth Games team event. Her success meant that Cyprus won more medals at a Commonwealth Games (eight) than it ever had before.

Although she had said her dream was to compete at the 2020 Summer Olympics, she announced her retirement from competitive sport in June 2019 via her Instagram profile.
