= Nile Wilson =

Former British artistic gymnast

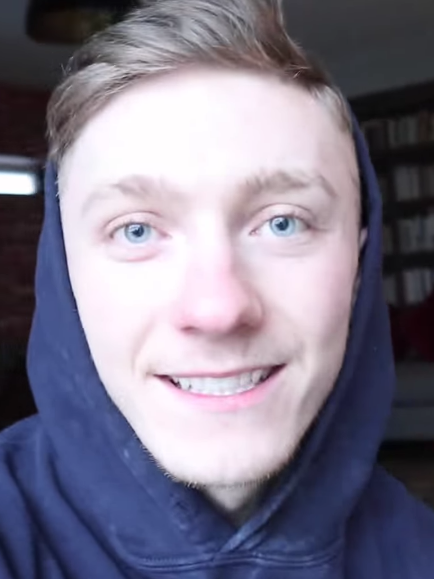

Personal information
- Full name: Nile Michael Wilson
- Nickname: Wilsonator
- Born: 17 January 1996 (age 30) Leeds, West Yorkshire, England
- Height: 166 cm (5 ft 5 in)

Gymnastics career
- Discipline: Men's artistic gymnastics
- Country represented: (United Kingdom) Great Britain; England; (2012–2020)
- Club: Leeds Gymnastics Club
- Retired: 14 January 2021
Medal record
Representing Great Britain
Men's artistic gymnastics
Olympic Games
Bronze medal – third place	2016 Rio de Janeiro	Horizontal bar
World Championships
Silver medal – second place	2015 Glasgow	Team
European Championships
Gold medal – first place	2016 Bern	Horizontal bar
Silver medal – second place	2016 Bern	Team
Representing England
Commonwealth Games
Gold medal – first place	2014 Glasgow	Team
Gold medal – first place	2014 Glasgow	Horizontal bar
Gold medal – first place	2018 Gold Coast	Team
Gold medal – first place	2018 Gold Coast	All-around
Gold medal – first place	2018 Gold Coast	Horizontal bar
Silver medal – second place	2014 Glasgow	Parallel bars
Silver medal – second place	2018 Gold Coast	Rings
Silver medal – second place	2018 Gold Coast	Parallel Bars
Bronze medal – third place	2014 Glasgow	All-around

YouTube information
- Channel: Nile Wilson
- Years active: 2009–present
- Genres: Vlogs; artistic gymnastics
- Subscribers: 1.66 million
- Views: 508 million
- Last updated: 27 October 2025

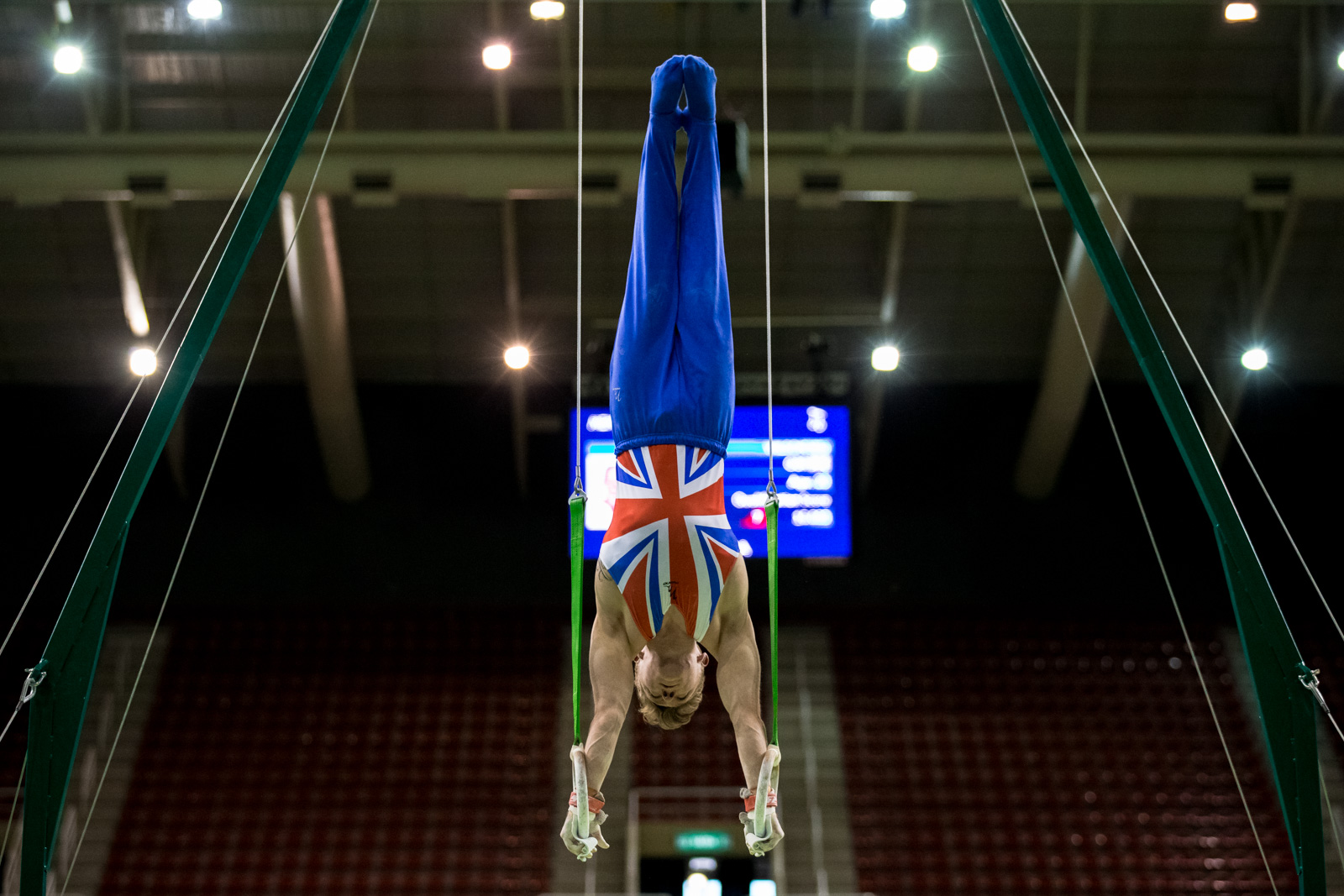
Nile Wilson 2016 Olympics Test Event event finals

Nile Michael Wilson (born 17 January 1996) is a former British artistic gymnast. He won an Olympic bronze medal in the men's horizontal bar at the 2016 Summer Olympics; he was a world medallist as a member of the silver-medal winning British team at the 2015 World Artistic Gymnastics Championships, the first world men's team medal in British gymnastics history.

A five-time Commonwealth Games champion, he won the all-around title in 2018, and is a former European horizontal bar champion, the first Briton to win the title. In January 2021, Wilson announced his retirement from competitive gymnastics due to injuries and mental health concerns. In March 2023, he won the fifteenth series of Dancing on Ice with dance partner Olivia Smart.

== Early life ==
Wilson was born on 17 January 1996 in Leeds to Sally and Neil Wilson and is the great nephew of Duncan Fearnley. He has a sister, Joanna. He attended 'Farsley Farfield' Primary School and Pudsey Grangefield School.

== Gymnastics career ==
Wilson was crowned British Junior Champion in March 2014 and received the Young Sportsman male award at the Leeds Sports Awards. He competed at the 2014 European Championships in Sofia in May, winning five gold medals to become the first British gymnast ever to win five gold medals at the European Junior Gymnastics Championships. He was then selected to compete for the England Commonwealth Games team, graduating to senior level.

=== 2014 Commonwealth Games ===
At the 2014 Commonwealth Games, Wilson contributed a score of 86.607 for the England team to win the Team Gold and qualify second for the Individual all-around final, behind teammate Max Whitlock. Wilson then won a bronze medal in the all-around final with a score of 87.965. He won silver in the Parallel bars final with a score of 15.433 behind Scottish gymnast Daniel Purvis. Wilson took his first individual Commonwealth gold in the Horizontal Bar final with a score of 14.966. His teammate Kristian Thomas took silver.

=== 2015 World Championships ===
Wilson competed at the 2015 Gymnastics World Championships in Glasgow. He placed tenth all around in qualification with 88.365, but did not advance due to the two per country rule. Wilson competed on three apparatus in the team final: Still Rings (14.933), Parallel Bars (15.033) and Horizontal bar (14.833), contributing to the team silver medal. Wilson also qualified to the Parallel Bars final, placing 8th with a score of 15.233.

=== 2016 Summer Olympics ===
Wilson competed at the AT&T American Cup on 5 March 2016. He struggled in the competition, receiving execution scores below eight on three apparatuses. He did, however, receive the third highest score on parallel bars, scoring 15.266. He came fifth overall with a score of 84.131.

On 12 July 2016, Wilson was named to the 2016 Olympic team along with Louis Smith, Max Whitlock, Kristian Thomas and Brinn Bevan. At the 2016 Olympics, Wilson became the first British gymnast to win the bronze medal on the horizontal bar, with a score of 15.466.

=== 2017 World Championships ===
In January 2017, Wilson suffered an injury to his left ankle ligament while training, which required surgery. He recovered in time to compete in the 2017 Artistic Gymnastics World Championships where he finished sixth in the all-around final.

=== 2018 Commonwealth Games ===
In 2018, Wilson was selected to represent England and compete at the Commonwealth Games in the Gold Coast, Australia. On 5 April, he won a gold medal in the men's artistic team all-around and qualified in first place for the individual all-around which he went on to win for his second gold medal. He added a third gold on the horizontal bar, and won silver on the rings and on the parallel bars.

Wilson underwent surgery on his neck in February 2019 to fix a bulging disc that was causing arm pain, and as a result, he missed several competitions that year, including the Birmingham World Cup and European Championships.

=== Retirement from gymnastics ===
On 14 January 2021, Wilson uploaded a video titled "I've Retired from Gymnastics" to his YouTube channel, in which he announced his official retirement from competitive gymnastics. In the video, he cited health problems caused by gymnastics as the main factor in his retirement. In September 2022, Wilson gave a TED Talk about mental health impacts on professional athletes.

== Post-gymnastics career ==
Following his retirement from professional gymnastics, Wilson has raised allegations of a culture of abuse within British gymnastics. Whilst speaking with BBC Sport, Wilson stated that he was "without a doubt" abused during his training, was subject to "emotional manipulation", and was forced to "live in fear" of his coaches and the consequences of underperforming. Wilson also informed BBC Sport that he waited until after his retirement to raise these allegations as he feared he would face professional consequences, including deselection from the British Olympic team, if he spoke up whilst continuing to work as a professional gymnast. In March 2023, he won the fifteenth series of Dancing on Ice with dance partner Olivia Smart.

Wilson runs a YouTube channel where he posts vlogs about his workouts, daily life, and gymnastics (Nile Wilson), where he has more than 1.51 million subscribers, and another channel with his father (Neil and Nile Vlogs), which has more than 171,000 subscribers.
