= Sophie Crane =

Canadian rhythmic gymnast (born 2002)

- Born: October 13, 2002 (age 23) Toronto

Gymnastics career
- Discipline: Rhythmic gymnastics
- Country represented: Canada; (2015–2021)
- Club: Jusco Rhythmic Gymnastics Club
- Head coach: Stefka Moutafchieva
Medal record
Rhythmic gymnastics
Representing Canada
Commonwealth Games
Gold medal – first place	2018 Gold Coast	Clubs
Pan American Championships
Bronze medal – third place	2018 Lima	Clubs
Junior Pan American Championships
Silver medal – second place	2017 Daytona Beach	Team
Bronze medal – third place	2016 Merida	Team

Sophie Crane (born 13 October 2002) is a Canadian retired rhythmic gymnast. She won multiple medals at the Pan American Championships.

== Career ==
Crane took up the sport in 2008 after watching the Beijing Olympics. In 2016 she won bronze in teams at the Pan American Championships. A year later she won silver in teams, along Michel Vivier and Natalie Garcia, at the 2017 Pan American Championships.

She became a senior in 2018 making her debut at the Commonwealth Games. There she took 9th place in the All-Around, 7th with hoop, and 4th in teams (along Katherine Uchida and Carmen Whelan) and won gold in the clubs final. At the World Cup in Guadalajara, being 27th in the All-Around, 21st with hoop, 34th with ball, 25th with clubs and 34th with ribbon. At the stage in Minsk she was 38th overall, 32nd with hoop, 33rd with ball, 27th with clubs and 49th with ribbon. She was then selected for the World Championships in Sofia, finishing 15th in teams, 47th in the All-Around, 35th with hoop, 56th with ball and 55th with clubs. Weeks later she won bronze with clubs at the Pan American Championships.

In 2019 she competed in the World Cup in Pesaro, being 51st in the All-Around, 38th with hoop, 28th with ball, 55th with clubs and 59th with ribbon. In Sofia she was 31st overall, 43rd with hoop, 29th with ball, 22nd with clubs and 33rd with ribbon. In Baku she took 41st place in the All-Around, 40th with hoop, 26th with ball, 50th with clubs and 53rd with ribbon. Sophie then participated in the World Championships, being 85th in the All-Around, 45th with ball, 78th with clubs, 137th with ribbon and 21st in teams.
