= Cory Paterson (gymnast) =

Canadian artistic gymnast

- Born: May 24, 1995 (age 31)

Gymnastics career
- Discipline: Men's artistic gymnastics
- Country represented: Canada
Medal record
Representing Canada
Pan American Games
Bronze medal – third place	2019 Lima	All-around
Bronze medal – third place	2019 Lima	Team all-around
Commonwealth Games
Silver medal – second place	2018 Gold Coast	Team
Silver medal – second place	2018 Gold Coast	Horizontal bar

Cory Paterson (born May 24, 1995) is a Canadian artistic gymnast.

In 2018, both Paterson and James Hall won the silver medal in the men's horizontal bar event at the Commonwealth Games held in Gold Coast, Australia. Paterson also won the silver medal in the men's artistic team all-around event.

He represented Canada at the 2019 Pan American Games held in Lima, Peru, and he won the bronze medal in the men's artistic individual all-around event. He also won the bronze medal in the men's artistic team all-around event.
