= Stephani Sherlock =

British rhythmic gymnast (born 1996)

- Full name: Stephani Anne Sherlock
- Nicknames: Stephi, Stephik
- Born: 2 September 1996 (age 30) Moscow, Russia

Gymnastics career
- Discipline: Rhythmic gymnastics
- Country represented: England Great Britain; (2011–2018)
- College team: Lesgaft National State University of Physical Education, Sport and Health
- Club: Esprit Gymnastics, Swindon, United Kingdom
- Gym: Esprit Gymnastics, Swindon, United Kingdom; Novogorsk, Russia
- Head coach: Deb Hows
- Assistant coach: Ruth Wilson

Stephani Anne Sherlock (born 2 September 1996) is a British individual rhythmic gymnast who has represented England and Great Britain at international competitions.

== Personal life ==
She was born on 2 September 1996 in Moscow, Russia. Born to a Russian mother and an English father, Sherlock took up rhythmic gymnastics at age 10 in her native Russia and first joined Esprit Gymnastics club at age 13 in 2009. Her first British championships was in 2010, and then based on a selection event in early 2011, she was selected for the British national team and started representing Great Britain internationally. She speaks fluent Russian and English. She studied at school in Moscow and graduated with a Red Diploma in 2014. She enrolled at the Lesgaft National State University of Physical Education, Sport and Health in Saint Petersburg in 2015.

== Career highlights ==
Sherlock won her first English championships as a junior in 2011 and became British ribbon junior champion the same year. She won the English championships and all four senior British apparatus final titles in 2013. Sherlock represented England at the 2014 Commonwealth Games where they finished 4th in the team event, and she qualified to the all-around final (10th) and came 7th in the hoop and ball finals. She won silver in the all-around British championships in 2015 as well as the gold medal in the ribbon final.

Sherlock represented Great Britain at the 2014 World Championships in İzmir and at the 2015 World Championships in Stuttgart. She won five golds and became English Champion on 3 July 2016. On 8–10 July, Sherlock finished 32nd in the all-around at the 2016 Kazan World Cup. She won the senior all-around British Championships on 29–30 July 2016 in Liverpool. She also took the gold in the ball final at the same event.

In the 2017 season, Sherlock competed at the 2017 Moscow Grand Prix, where she finished 22nd in the all-around. From 5 to 7 May she competed at the 2017 Sofia World Cup and finished 39th in the all-around. Sherlock finished 32nd in the all-around at the 2017 Berlin World Challenge Cup held from 7 to 9 July. From 19 to 21 May, Sherlock, along with teammate Laura Halford, represented the individual seniors for Great Britain at the 2017 European Championships.
