= Katherine Uchida =

Canadian rhythmic gymnast

- Born: 8 November 1999 (age 26) Toronto, Ontario, Canada

Gymnastics career
- Discipline: Rhythmic gymnastics
- Country represented: Canada
- Club: Jusco RSG
- Head coach: Stefka Moutafchieva
Medal record
Gymnastics
Representing Canada
Commonwealth Games
Silver medal – second place	2018 Gold Coast	Individual all-around
Pan American Games
Silver medal – second place	2019 Lima	Ball
Silver medal – second place	2019 Lima	Hoop
Pacific Rim Championships
Silver medal – second place	2014 Everett	Team
Silver medal – second place	2016 Everett	Team
Bronze medal – third place	2016 Everett	Individual all-around

Katherine Uchida (born 8 November 1999) is a Canadian retired individual rhythmic gymnast. She is 2019 Canadian champion, and she won the silver medal in the all-around at the 2018 Commonwealth Games.

== Career ==
Uchida began gymnastics at age 6. She initially trained in artistic gymnastics, and she also took ballet lessons. While out with her brother, she saw a rhythmic gymnastics demonstration, and the gymnasts let her try the sport. She switched to rhythmic after this experience.

As a junior, Uchida participated in the 2014 Pacific Rim Championships, where she won a silver medal in the team event. Later in the year, she competed at the Pan American Championships and won bronze in the team event.

She joined the national team in 2015. At the 2015 World Championships, she competed with two apparatuses, clubs and ribbon. Around this time, she struggled with pain in her foot and ankle that was so severe that she struggled to walk. She was eventually diagnosed with having an extra bone in her ankle.

In 2016, at the Pacific Rim Championships, she won a silver medal in the team event and a bronze medal in the individual all-around. The next year, she competed in the all-around at the 2017 World Championships and placed 57th in qualifications.

In 2018, she had to cease training for a month due to a compression injury in her back. That year, she won a silver medal at the 2018 Commonwealth Games in the individual all-around event behind Diamanto Evripidou. She also qualified for three apparatus finals, placing 5th in both hoop and clubs and 8th in ribbon. At the World Championships, held in Sofia, Bulgaria, she placed 33rd in qualifications.

The next year, Uchida became the Canadian national champion. She finished 5th in the all-around at the 2019 Pan American Games after making a mistake in her last routine; she expressed frustration about this result, saying "I literally let a medal slip out of my hands." However, in the apparatus finals, she regrouped to win two silver medals in the ball and hoop events. Uchida said afterward, "I was really disappointed after my performances in the all-around competition, so today, I was trying to forgive and forget, and that’s what I did." In September, she again placed 33rd in qualifications at the World Championships.

In 2020, Uchida had a hip injury. She hoped to compete at the 2020 Summer Olympics, which were delayed due to the COVID-19 pandemic. The year afterward, Gymnastics Canada refused to send a team to the last Olympic qualifier, the 2021 Pan American Championships, due to safety concerns because of the ongoing pandemic. While a team was not named, Uchida was likely to have been sent to attempt to qualify. Twelve gymnasts, including Uchida, took a case to the Sport Dispute Resolution Centre of Canada over the decision, asking that they be allowed to compete; however, their request was denied. Uchida did not compete at the national championships due to a back injury, but she went on to compete at the 2021 World Championships in Kitakyushu, Japan, where she finished 42nd in the qualification round.

== Personal life ==
Uchida has a brother who is an elite climber. She studied sociology and international relations at the University of Toronto. She was one of a number of gymnasts who visited the Hiroshima Peace Memorial Park in 2023 to promote peach through sports. One of her relatives died in the atomic bombings of Hiroshima.
