= Coomera Indoor Sports Centre =

Arena in Gold Coast, Queensland, Australia

Coomera Indoor Sports Centre (CISC)
- Location: Coomera, Queensland, Australia
- Capacity: 7,500

Construction
- Built: 2014-2016
- Opened: 2016

Tenant
- 2018 Commonwealth Games

Coomera Indoor Sports Centre is an Australian entertainment and sporting arena which was built on the Gold Coast, Queensland.

== History and construction ==
On 12 November 2011, it was announced that the Gold Coast would host the 2018 Commonwealth Games. The Gold Coast bid included an indoor facility in Coomera that would hold a capacity of 2500 people and would host the Wrestling event. The bid also included the creation of the 7500-seat arena to be built in Southport. On 13 June 2014, the 2018 Commonwealth Games masterplan was finalised and the release revealed a new 7500-seat indoor arena to be built in Coomera. The arena will measure 10,000 square-metres and construction will be complete in 2016. The venue will be used for Volleyball in the 2032 Summer Olympics and Wheelchair Rugby for the 2032 Summer Paralympics.

== Sporting events ==
The arena hosted the netball and gymnastics events during the 2018 Commonwealth Games.

== See also ==
- Sports on the Gold Coast, Queensland
- Venues of the 2018 Commonwealth Games
