= 2014 Pacific Rim Gymnastics Championships – Men's Artistic Gymnastics =

The Men's Artistic Gymnastics competition for the 2014 Pacific Rim Gymnastics Championships was held on 10 April to 12 April 2014 at the Richmond Olympic Oval. The juniors and seniors competed together in the team final and individual all-around, but competed separately during the event finals. The team final and all-around competition were held on 10 April, the junior event finals were held on 11 April, and the senior event finals were held on 12 April.

== Team ==
Results

Rank	Team	Floor (gymnastics)	Pommel horse	Rings (gymnastics)	Vault (gymnastics)	Parallel bars	Horizontal bar	Total
1st place, gold medalist(s)	United States	55.700	56.350	58.250	55.700	55.900	56.650	338.550
1st place, gold medalist(s)	John Orozco	14.900	14.100	15.050	13.000	14.750	15.400	338.550
1st place, gold medalist(s)	Alexander Naddour	13.650	15.000	14.950		14.350	13.500	338.550
1st place, gold medalist(s)	Chris Brooks		13.350	14.550	14.750		14.750	338.550
1st place, gold medalist(s)	Alec Yoder	13.250	13.900	13.700	13.950			338.550
1st place, gold medalist(s)	Marty Strech	13.900			14.000	13.500	13.000	338.550
1st place, gold medalist(s)	Davis Grooms					13.300		338.550
2nd place, silver medalist(s)	Japan	57.600	53.650	54.500	56.650	55.250	55.900	333.550
2nd place, silver medalist(s)	Toshiya Ikejiri	14.450	14.000	13.150	14.400	14.750	14.300	333.550
2nd place, silver medalist(s)	Yuto Murakami	15.000	14.000	14.000		14.450	13.750	333.550
2nd place, silver medalist(s)	Shohei Fuiwara	14.150		14.350	14.300	13.300	14.350	333.550
2nd place, silver medalist(s)	Kakeru Tanigawa			13.000				333.550
2nd place, silver medalist(s)	Kenya Yuasa		13.950		13.950		13.500	333.550
2nd place, silver medalist(s)	Kentaro Yunoki	14.000	11.700		14.000	12.750		333.550
3rd place, bronze medalist(s)	Canada	57.000	47.800	56.400	55.850	54.700	54.650	326.400
3rd place, bronze medalist(s)	Hugh Smith		12.000	14.000	14.250	13.650	13.500	326.400
3rd place, bronze medalist(s)	Kevin Lytwyn	14.100		14.500	14.300	14.750	15.050	326.400
3rd place, bronze medalist(s)	Scott Morgan	15.250		14.250	13.950			326.400
3rd place, bronze medalist(s)	René Cournoyer	13.900	11.700		13.350	12.650	13.600	326.400
3rd place, bronze medalist(s)	Ryan Oehrlein	13.750	11.800	13.650		13.650	12.500	326.400
3rd place, bronze medalist(s)	Aaron Mah		12.300					326.400
4	China	54.400	48.600	55.300	54.950	56.300	56.250	325.800
4	Cai Weifeng	13.950	14.100	14.650	14.000		13.900	325.800
4	Yang Shengchao	13.450	12.200	13.200	13.650	13.600	14.750	325.800
4	Lu Wentiao	12.650	11.100	13.900	14.050	15.150	14.000	325.800
4	Huang Mingqi	14.350				14.100	13.600	325.800
4	Zou Jingyuan		11.200	13.500		13.450		325.800
4	Huang Zhou				13.250			325.800
5	Australia	54.700	44.850	50.650	53.800	51.250	51.600	306.850
5	Luke Wiwatowski	14.300	10.750	12.700	13.900	13.000	12.400	306.850
5	Michael Mercieca		9.850	13.350	13.250	12.650	13.050	306.850
5	Jayden Bull	13.500					14.600	306.850
5	Joshua Di Nucci		11.900		12.500			306.850
5	Gabriel O'Sullivan	13.000	12.350	12.200		12.550	11.550	306.850
5	Clay Stevens	13.900		12.200	14.150	13.050		306.850
6	Chinese Taipei	47.550	38.000	53.450	52.600	53.050	50.600	295.250
6	Lee Chih-Kai	11.450	11.100	13.200	14.300	14.000	13.900	295.250
6	Lee Chih-Yu	13.050	8.050	15.350	12.750	13.400	13.050	295.250
6	Lin Yi-Chieh	11.150	9.000	13.350	13.850	12.800	12.450	295.250
6	Lee Yu-Chen	11.900	9.850	11.550	11.700	12.850	11.200	295.250
7	Mexico	46.300	36.150	50.250	52.850	50.450	48.600	284.600
7	Javier Balboa Gonzalez	13.100	11.100	14.100	14.050	14.500	12.450	284.600
7	Andres Resendiz Sanchez	10.250	10.350	12.450	13.050	12.900	12.300	284.600
7	Jamie Humberto Romero Moran	11.450	8.550	11.750	13.700	11.250	12.300	284.600
7	Francisco Javier Rodriguez Moran	11.500	6.150	11.950	12.050	11.800	11.550	284.600

== Senior ==
=== All-Around ===
Results

Rank	Gymnast	Floor (gymnastics)	Pommel horse	Rings (gymnastics)	Vault (gymnastics)	Parallel bars	Horizontal bar	Total
1st place, gold medalist(s)	John Orozco; United States	14.900	14.100	15.050	13.000	14.750	15.400	87.200
2nd place, silver medalist(s)	Toshiya Ikejiri; Japan	14.450	14.000	13.150	14.400	14.750	14.300	85.050
3rd place, bronze medalist(s)	Yuto Murakami; Japan	15.000	14.000	14.000	13.700	14.450	13.750	84.900
4	Alexander Naddour; United States	13.650	15.000	14.950	12.650	14.350	13.500	84.100
5	Cai Weifeng; China	13.950	14.100	14.650	14.000	12.800	13.900	83.400
6	Jossimar Calvo; Colombia	13.300	10.800	14.000	13.850	15.600	14.550	82.100
7	Shohei Fuiwara; Japan	14.150	10.850	14.350	14.300	13.300	14.350	81.300
7	Chris Brooks; United States	11.750	13.350	14.550	14.750	12.150	14.750	81.300
9	Yang Shengchao; China	13.450	12.200	13.200	13.650	13.600	14.750	80.850
9	Lu Wentiao; China	12.650	11.100	13.900	14.050	15.150	14.000	80.850
9	Hugh Smith; Canada	13.450	12.000	14.000	14.250	13.650	13.500	80.850
12	Javier Balboa Gonzalez; Mexico	13.100	11.100	14.100	14.050	14.500	12.450	79.300
13	Lee Chih-Kai; Chinese Taipei	11.450	11.100	13.200	14.300	14.000	13.900	77.950
14	Luke Wiwatowski; Australia	14.300	10.750	12.700	13.900	13.000	12.400	77.050
15	Lee Chih-Yu; Chinese Taipei	13.050	8.050	15.350	12.750	13.400	13.050	75.650
16	Kyleab Ellis; New Zealand	13.700	12.150	11.500	13.850	13.150	11.100	74.450
17	Michael Mercieca; Australia	12.950	9.850	13.350	13.250	12.650	13.050	75.100
18	Maurico Gallegos; Peru	11.950	13.050	12.200	12.850	13.000	11.650	74.700
19	Kevin Lytwyn; Canada	14.100	0.000	14.500	14.300	14.750	15.050	72.700
20	Lin Yi-Chieh; Chinese Taipei	11.150	9.000	13.350	13.850	12.800	12.450	72.600
21	Andres Resendiz Sanchez; Mexico	10.250	10.350	12.450	13.050	12.900	12.300	71.300
22	Jean Nathan Monteclaro; Philippines	13.100	9.600	12.950	13.600	11.100	9.750	70.100
23	Jamie Humberto Romero Moran; Mexico	11.450	8.550	11.750	13.700	11.250	12.300	69.000
24	Henry Daniel Gonzalez Vega; Costa Rica	11.850	9.400	11.800	12.700	13.200	9.650	68.600
25	Jayden Bull; Australia	13.500	0.000	0.000	11.950	12.550	14.600	52.600
26	Tarik Soto Byfield; Costa Rica	13.600	11.800	0.000	13.900	0.000	12.750	52.050
27	Scott Morgan; Canada	15.250	0.000	14.250	13.950	0.000	0.000	43.450
28	Man Hin Jim; Hong Kong	0.000	0.000	0.000	12.700	11.000	10.700	34.400
29	Jorge Giraldo; Colombia	0.000	12.550	0.000	0.000	15.450	0.000	28.000
30	Reyland Capellan; Philippines	14.200	0.000	0.000	13.550	0.000	0.000	27.750
31	Juan Escobar; Colombia	0.000	0.000	0.000	0.000	14.100	11.400	25.500
32	Kiu Chung Ng; Hong Kong	0.000	0.000	15.500	0.000	0.000	0.000	15.500
33	Wai Hung Shek; Hong Kong	0.000	0.000	0.000	14.700	0.000	0.000	14.700
34	Andres Valverde Valverde; Costa Rica	0.000	10.100	0.000	0.000	0.000	0.000	10.100

=== Floor ===
Results

Rank	Gymnast	D Score	E Score	Pen.	Total
1st place, gold medalist(s)	Scott Morgan; Canada	6.40	8.450	0.000	14.850
2nd place, silver medalist(s)	John Orozco; United States	5.90	8.800	0.000	14.700
3rd place, bronze medalist(s)	Toshiya Ikejiri; Japan	6.00	8.350	0.000	14.350
4	Cai Weifeng; China	5.50	8.350	0.000	13.850
5	Kevin Lytwyn; Canada	6.50	7.200	0.000	13.700
6	Luke Wiwatowski; Australia	5.90	7.550	0.000	13.450
7	Yuto Murakami; Japan	6.00	7.350	0.000	13.350
8	Reyland Capellan; Philippines	6.20	7.100	0.000	13.300

=== Pommel Horse ===
Results

Rank	Gymnast	D Score	E Score	Pen.	Total
1st place, gold medalist(s)	Yang Shengchao; China	5.50	8.250	0.000	13.750
2nd place, silver medalist(s)	Cai Weifeng; China	5.70	7.950	0.000	13.650
3rd place, bronze medalist(s)	Jorge Giraldo; Colombia	6.00	7.550	0.000	13.550
4	Yuto Murakami; Japan	5.10	8.400	0.000	13.500
5	Alexander Naddour; United States	6.60	6.850	0.000	13.450
5	John Orozco; United States	6.40	7.050	0.000	13.450
7	Maurico Gallegos; Peru	5.40	7.550	0.000	12.950
8	Toshiya Ikejiri; Japan	4.90	7.050	0.000	11.950

=== Rings ===
Results

Rank	Gymnast	D Score	E Score	Pen.	Total
1st place, gold medalist(s)	Chen Chi-Yu; Chinese Taipei	6.70	8.700	0.000	15.400
2nd place, silver medalist(s)	John Orozco; United States	6.40	8.550	0.000	14.950
3rd place, bronze medalist(s)	Scott Morgan; Canada	6.60	8.250	0.000	14.850
4	Kiu Chung Ng; Hong Kong	6.60	8.200	0.000	14.800
5	Shohei Fuiwara; Japan	6.10	8.550	0.000	14.650
6	Alexander Naddour; United States	6.40	7.800	0.000	14.200
7	Cai Weifeng; China	6.40	7.450	0.000	13.850
8	Javier Balboa Gonzalez; Mexico	6.30	7.150	0.000	13.450

=== Vault ===
Results

Rank	Gymnast	D Score	E Score	Pen.	Total
1st place, gold medalist(s)	Jossimar Calvo; Colombia	5.60	8.950	0.000	14.550
1st place, gold medalist(s)	Hugh Smith; Canada	5.60	8.950	0.000	14.550
3rd place, bronze medalist(s)	Wai Hung Shek; Hong Kong	5.60	8.800	0.000	14.400
4	Jean Nathan Monteclaro; Philippines	5.60	8.475	0.000	14.075
4	Lee Chih-Kai; Chinese Taipei	5.20	8.875	0.000	14.075
6	Tarik Soto Byfield; Costa Rica	4.80	9.100	0.000	13.900
7	Scott Morgan; Canada	5.60	8.150	0.000	13.750
8	Kyleab Ellis; New Zealand	4.80	8.050	0.000	12.850

=== Parallel Bars ===
Results

Rank	Gymnast	D Score	E Score	Pen.	Total
1st place, gold medalist(s)	John Orozco; United States	6.70	8.650	0.000	15.350
2nd place, silver medalist(s)	Lu Wentiao; China	6.80	8.500	0.000	15.300
3rd place, bronze medalist(s)	Jossimar Calvo; Colombia	6.80	8.050	0.000	14.850
4	Jorge Giraldo; Colombia	6.40	8.250	0.000	14.650
5	Yuto Murakami; Japan	5.90	8.350	0.000	14.250
6	Javier Balboa Gonzalez; Mexico	6.20	7.600	0.000	13.800
7	Kevin Lytwyn; Canada	5.00	7.350	0.000	12.350
8	Toshiya Ikejiri; Japan	5.00	4.900	0.000	9.900

=== Horizontal Bar ===
Results

Rank	Gymnast	D Score	E Score	Pen.	Total
1st place, gold medalist(s)	John Orozco; United States	6.60	8.650	0.000	15.250
2nd place, silver medalist(s)	Jossimar Calvo; Colombia	7.30	7.300	0.000	14.600
2nd place, silver medalist(s)	Yang Shengchao; China	6.70	7.900	0.000	14.600
4	Kevin Lytwyn; Canada	6.80	7.450	0.000	14.250
5	Toshiya Ikejiri; Japan	5.80	8.350	0.000	14.150
6	Lu Wentiao; China	6.30	7.250	0.000	13.550
7	Shohei Fuiwara; Japan	6.20	7.150	0.000	13.350
8	Jayden Bull; Australia	5.90	6.350	0.000	12.250

== Junior ==
=== All-Around ===
Results

Rank	Gymnast	Floor (gymnastics)	Pommel horse	Rings (gymnastics)	Vault (gymnastics)	Parallel bars	Horizontal bar	Total
1st place, gold medalist(s)	Kakeru Tanigawa; Japan	14.450	13.600	13.000	13.650	14.000	14.000	82.700
2nd place, silver medalist(s)	Alec Yoder; United States	13.250	13.900	13.700	13.950	12.100	13.500	80.400
2nd place, silver medalist(s)	Marty Strech; United States	13.900	12.450	13.550	14.000	13.500	13.000	80.400
4	Davis Grooms; United States	13.350	13.750	13.200	13.400	13.300	12.600	79.600
5	Kenya Yuasa; Japan	12.000	13.950	12.850	13.950	12.350	13.500	78.600
6	René Cournoyer; Canada	13.900	11.700	12.900	13.350	12.650	13.600	78.100
7	Kentaro Yunoki; Japan	14.000	11.700	13.000	14.000	12.750	12.350	77.800
8	Ryan Oehrlein; Canada	13.750	11.800	13.650	11.350	13.650	12.500	76.700
9	Joshua Di Nucci; Australia	13.500	11.900	12.100	12.500	12.550	12.150	74.700
10	Gabriel O'Sullivan; Australia	13.000	12.350	12.200	12.700	12.550	11.550	74.350
11	Reegan Edwards; New Zealand	13.300	12.100	11.500	12.350	12.000	13.000	74.250
12	Luis Pizarro; Peru	12.400	12.800	11.750	12.450	13.150	11.500	74.050
13	Clay Stevens; Australia	13.900	8.900	12.200	14.150	13.050	11.500	73.700
14	Harvey Humber; New Zealand	12.700	8.100	11.900	11.850	12.550	12.350	69.450
15	Lee Yu-Chen; Chinese Taipei	11.900	9.850	11.550	11.700	12.850	11.200	69.050
16	Francisco Javier Rodriguez Moran; Mexico	11.500	6.150	11.950	12.050	11.800	11.550	65.000
17	Huang Mingqi; China	14.350	0.000	0.000	13.250	14.100	13.600	55.300
18	Aaron Mah; Canada	0.000	12.300	12.300	0.000	12.300	12.100	49.000
19	Zou Jingyuan; China	0.000	11.200	13.500	0.000	13.450	0.000	38.200
20	Carlos Edriel Yulo; Philippines	13.650	0.000	0.000	13.450	0.000	0.000	27.100
21	Huang Zhou; China	0.000	11.000	0.000	13.250	0.000	0.000	24.250

=== Floor ===
Results

Rank	Gymnast	D Score	E Score	Pen.	Total
1st place, gold medalist(s)	Huang Mingqi; China	5.20	9.100	0.000	14.300
1st place, gold medalist(s)	Kakeru Tanigawa; Japan	5.10	9.200	0.000	14.300
3rd place, bronze medalist(s)	Marty Strech; United States	5.20	8.900	0.000	14.100
4	Kentaro Yunoki; Japan	5.20	8.750	0.000	13.950
5	Ryan Oehrlein; Canada	5.10	8.700	0.000	13.800
6	Carlos Edriel Yulo; Philippines	5.20	8.300	0.000	13.500
7	René Cournoyer; Canada	5.10	7.800	0.000	12.900
8	Clay Stevens; Australia	5.40	6.700	0.000	12.100

=== Pommel Horse ===
Results

Rank	Gymnast	D Score	E Score	Pen.	Total
1st place, gold medalist(s)	Alec Yoder; United States	5.60	7.950	0.000	13.550
2nd place, silver medalist(s)	Davis Grooms; United States	5.20	8.050	0.000	13.250
3rd place, bronze medalist(s)	Kakeru Tanigawa; Japan	4.60	8.600	0.000	13.200
4	Kenya Yuasa; Japan	4.90	7.750	0.000	12.650
5	Reegan Edwards; New Zealand	4.10	8.400	0.000	12.500
6	Aaron Mah; Canada	4.80	7.550	0.000	12.350
7	Gabriel O'Sullivan; Australia	4.90	6.700	0.000	11.600
8	Luis Pizarro; Peru	4.30	7.100	0.000	11.400

=== Rings ===
Results

Rank	Gymnast	D Score	E Score	Pen.	Total
1st place, gold medalist(s)	Ryan Oehrlein; Canada	5.50	8.400	0.000	13.900
2nd place, silver medalist(s)	Zou Jingyuan; China	5.30	8.450	0.000	13.750
3rd place, bronze medalist(s)	Alec Yoder; United States	5.20	8.250	0.000	13.450
4	Kentaro Yunoki; Japan	4.90	8.500	0.000	13.400
5	René Cournoyer; Canada	5.10	8.100	0.000	13.200
6	Kakeru Tanigawa; Japan	4.70	8.450	0.000	13.150
7	Marty Strech; United States	5.00	8.100	0.000	13.100
8	Gabriel O'Sullivan; Australia	4.70	7.750	0.000	12.450
8	Clay Stevens; Australia	4.50	7.950	0.000	12.450

=== Vault ===
Results

Rank	Gymnast	D Score	E Score	Pen.	Total
1st place, gold medalist(s)	Clay Stevens; Australia	5.20	9.350	0.000	14.550
2nd place, silver medalist(s)	Marty Strech; United States	5.20	9.200	0.000	14.400
3rd place, bronze medalist(s)	Kenya Yuasa; Japan	5.20	9.050	0.000	14.250
4	René Cournoyer; Canada	5.60	8.400	0.000	14.000
5	Alec Yoder; United States	5.20	8.750	0.000	13.950
6	Kentaro Yunoki; Japan	5.20	8.700	0.000	13.900
7	Huang Mingqi; China	5.60	8.000	0.000	13.600
8	Carlos Edriel Yulo; Philippines	3.60	8.700	0.000	12.300

=== Parallel Bars ===
Results

Rank	Gymnast	D Score	E Score	Pen.	Total
1st place, gold medalist(s)	Kakeru Tanigawa; Japan	4.80	9.150	0.000	13.950
2nd place, silver medalist(s)	Huang Mingqi; China	5.30	8.600	0.000	13.900
3rd place, bronze medalist(s)	Zou Jingyuan; China	5.60	8.150	0.000	13.750
3rd place, bronze medalist(s)	Davis Grooms; United States	5.20	8.550	0.000	13.750
5	Marty Strech; United States	4.90	8.300	0.000	13.200
6	Luis Pizarro; Peru	4.40	8.500	0.000	12.900
7	Ryan Oehrlein; Canada	4.90	7.950	0.000	12.850
8	Clay Stevens; Australia	4.40	8.250	0.000	12.650

=== Horizontal Bar ===
Results

Rank	Gymnast	D Score	E Score	Pen.	Total
1st place, gold medalist(s)	Kenya Yuasa; Japan	5.10	8.800	0.000	13.900
1st place, gold medalist(s)	Kakeru Tanigawa; Japan	4.90	8.600	0.000	13.900
3rd place, bronze medalist(s)	Huang Mingqi; China	5.20	8.450	0.000	13.650
4	Alec Yoder; United States	5.10	8.100	0.000	13.200
4	René Cournoyer; Canada	4.90	8.300	0.000	13.200
4	Marty Strech; United States	4.80	8.400	0.000	13.200
7	Reegan Edwards; New Zealand	4.50	7.950	0.000	12.450
8	Ryan Oehrlein; Canada	4.40	7.950	0.000	12.350
