= Gymnastics at the 2010 Summer Youth Olympics – Women's rhythmic individual all-around =

Girl's rhythmic individual all-around competition at the 2010 Summer Youth Olympics was held at the Bishan Sports Hall.

There were two rounds of competition in the individual competition. In each round, competing gymnasts performed four routines. One routine was performed with each of the four apparatus: rope, hoop, ball and clubs. The combined scores from the four routines made up the preliminary round score. The top eight gymnasts after the preliminary round advanced to the finals. There, they performed each routine again. Preliminary scores were ignored, and the top combined final scores won.

== Medalists ==
Gold	Silver	Bronze
Alexandra Merkulova; Russia	Arina Charopa; Belarus	Jana Berezko-Marggrander; Germany

== Qualification ==
Rank	Gymnast	Rope	Hoop	Ball	Clubs	Total	Notes
1	Alexandra Merkulova (RUS)	25.550	26.300	26.200	25.375	103.425	Q
2	Arina Charopa (BLR)	25.925	25.550	25.500	25.250	102.225	Q
3	Jana Berezko-Marggrander (GER)	23.950	24.700	24.650	24.525	97.825	Q
4	Anastasiya Kisse (BUL)	25.025	24.500	24.200	24.100	97.825	Q
5	Wan Nin Lee (MAS)	23.800	24.075	24.100	24.425	96.400	Q
6	Victoria Veinberg Filanovsky (ISR)	23.100	23.325	23.500	23.825	93.750	Q
7	Viktoria Shynkarenko (UKR)	23.725	23.425	22.825	22.400	92.375	Q
8	Polina Kozitskiy (USA)	23.475	23.475	22.325	22.700	91.975	Q
9	Aziza Mamadjanova (UZB)	22.325	22.400	22.975	22.650	90.350	R
10	Eugenia Onopko (ESP)	21.375	23.000	21.900	21.675	87.950	R
11	Maria Kitkarska (CAN)	21.200	21.050	22.250	22.550	87.050	
12	Alia Elkatib (EGY)	20.675	21.875	22.050	21.350	83.950	
13	Yuliya Kizima (KAZ)	21.050	21.200	20.100	20.775	83.125	
14	Aimee van Rooyen (RSA)	20.450	20.850	20.350	21.250	82.900	
15	Manqin Wang (CHN)	20.200	20.700	20.950	20.000	81.850	
16	Taylor Tirahardjo (AUS)	20.500	20.400	20.475	20.275	81.650	
17	Isha Elienai Sanchez Hernandez (MEX)	20.725	19.875	19.250	19.350	79.200	
18	Anica Profitt (NAM)	18.600	19.150	16.450	18.900	73.100	

== Final ==
Rank	Gymnast	Rope	Hoop	Ball	Clubs	Total
Gold medal	Alexandra Merkulova (RUS)	25.950	26.250	25.800	25.500	103.500
Silver medal	Arina Charopa (BLR)	25.300	23.550	25.775	25.775	100.400
Bronze medal	Jana Berezko-Marggrander (GER)	24.350	24.200	25.225	25.100	98.875
4	Wan Nin Lee (MAS)	24.150	24.700	25.050	24.300	98.200
5	Anastasiya Kisse (BUL)	23.925	24.400	23.500	24.550	96.375
6	Victoria Veinberg Filanovsky (ISR)	23.150	23.300	23.000	23.400	92.850
7	Polina Kozitskiy (USA)	22.900	23.050	23.100	23.075	92.125
8	Viktoria Shynkarenko (UKR)	23.175	22.325	22.050	23.450	91.000
