= Gymnastics at the 2018 Commonwealth Games – Men's artistic team all-around =

Men's artistic team all-around at the 2018 Commonwealth Games
- Venue: Coomera Indoor Sports Centre
- Dates: 5 April 2018
- Competitors: 42 from 9 nations

Medalists
| gold medal | Max Whitlock; Nile Wilson; James Hall; Courtney Tulloch; Dominick Cunningham | England |
| silver medal | Cory Paterson; Jackson Payne; René Cournoyer; Scott Morgan; Zachary Clay | Canada |
| bronze medal | Daniel Purvis; Frank Baines; Hamish Carter; Kelvin Cham; David Weir | Scotland |

The Men's artistic team all-around gymnastics competition at the 2018 Commonwealth Games in Gold Coast, Australia was held on 5 April 2018 at the Coomera Indoor Sports Centre.

This event also determined the qualification standings for the individual all-around and apparatus finals.

== Schedule ==
The schedule is as follows:

All times are Australian Eastern Standard Time (UTC+10)

| Date | Time | Round |
|---|---|---|
| Thursday 5 April 2018 | 09:08 | Competition |

== Results ==
=== Team competition ===
The results are as follows:

| Rank | Country | Floor (gymnastics) | Pommel horse | Rings (gymnastics) | Vault (gymnastics) | Parallel bars | Horizontal bar | Total |
|---|---|---|---|---|---|---|---|---|
| 1st place, gold medalist(s) | England | 43.000 | 42.300 | 43.850 | 44.050 | 42.600 | 43.150 | 258.950 |
| 1st place, gold medalist(s) | Courtney Tulloch | – | – | 15.200 | 14.850 | ~~13.050~~ | – | 258.950 |
| 1st place, gold medalist(s) | Max Whitlock | 14.800 | 15.150 | – | – | – | – | 258.950 |
| 1st place, gold medalist(s) | James Hall | 14.050 | 13.950 | 13.900 | ~~14.250~~ | 14.250 | 14.450 | 258.950 |
| 1st place, gold medalist(s) | Nile Wilson | 14.150 | ~~12.900~~ | 14.750 | 14.350 | 14.850 | 15.100 | 258.950 |
| 1st place, gold medalist(s) | Dominick Cunningham | ~~13.950~~ | 13.200 | ~~13.400~~ | 14.850 | 13.500 | 13.600 | 258.950 |
| 2nd place, silver medalist(s) | Canada | 41.700 | 39.700 | 42.350 | 41.600 | 42.200 | 41.100 | 248.650 |
| 2nd place, silver medalist(s) | Cory Paterson | ~~13.400~~ | 12.850 | – | ~~12.150~~ | 14.000 | 14.000 | 248.650 |
| 2nd place, silver medalist(s) | Jackson Payne | 13.650 | ~~12.050~~ | ~~13.200~~ | – | 13.950 | 13.250 | 248.650 |
| 2nd place, silver medalist(s) | René Cournoyer | 13.600 | 12.650 | 14.200 | 13.550 | 14.250 | 13.850 | 248.650 |
| 2nd place, silver medalist(s) | Scott Morgan | 14.450 | – | 14.200 | 14.600 | – | – | 248.650 |
| 2nd place, silver medalist(s) | Zachary Clay | – | 14.200 | 13.950 | 13.450 | ~~12.800~~ | ~~10.550~~ | 248.650 |
| 3rd place, bronze medalist(s) | Scotland | 41.850 | 37.200 | 38.975 | 42.150 | 41.300 | 39.500 | 240.975 |
| 3rd place, bronze medalist(s) | Daniel Purvis | 13.850 | 12.250 | 13.550 | ~~13.100~~ | 13.550 | 12.950 | 240.975 |
| 3rd place, bronze medalist(s) | Frank Baines | 13.725 | 11.700 | 12.625 | 14.100 | 14.050 | 13.300 | 240.975 |
| 3rd place, bronze medalist(s) | Hamish Carter | 14.275 | 13.250 | 12.800 | 14.100 | 13.700 | 13.250 | 240.975 |
| 3rd place, bronze medalist(s) | Kelvin Cham | – | ~~10.900~~ | ~~11.700~~ | – | – | – | 240.975 |
| 3rd place, bronze medalist(s) | David Weir | ~~13.400~~ | – | – | 13.950 | ~~12.850~~ | ~~12.700~~ | 240.975 |
| 4 | Cyprus | 40.000 | 38.500 | 40.100 | 41.675 | 40.850 | 38.850 | 239.975 |
| 4 | Marios Georgiou | 13.950 | 12.900 | 13.750 | 14.300 | 14.150 | ~~10.950~~ | 239.975 |
| 4 | Ilias Georgiou | 12.900 | 13.050 | 13.350 | 13.425 | 14.300 | 13.750 | 239.975 |
| 4 | Michalis Krasias | ~~11.600~~ | 12.550 | 13.000 | ~~13.400~~ | ~~11.750~~ | 13.050 | 239.975 |
| 4 | Neofytos Kyriakou | 13.150 | ~~11.000~~ | – | 13.950 | 12.400 | 12.050 | 239.975 |
| 5 | Australia | 37.800 | 39.900 | 39.425 | 41.900 | 40.550 | 38.550 | 238.125 |
| 5 | Michael Mercieca | 12.950 | ~~12.050~~ | 12.900 | 13.450 | 13.600 | 12.850 | 238.125 |
| 5 | Mitchell Morgans | – | – | – | – | 13.700 | 12.500 | 238.125 |
| 5 | Christopher Remkes | 13.250 | 13.750 | – | 14.950 | – | – | 238.125 |
| 5 | Michael Tone | 11.600 | 13.850 | 13.375 | 13.500 | ~~12.950~~ | 13.200 | 238.125 |
| 5 | Luke Wadsworth | – | 12.300 | 13.150 | – | 13.250 | ~~12.950~~ | 238.125 |
| 6 | New Zealand | 40.400 | 36.650 | 39.375 | 42.200 | 40.325 | 38.450 | 237.400 |
| 6 | David Bishop | – | 12.500 | ~~12.450~~ | ~~13.800~~ | – | 12.450 | 237.400 |
| 6 | Devy Dyson | ~~11.150~~ | ~~10.200~~ | 13.825 | – | ~~12.800~~ | 13.200 | 237.400 |
| 6 | Ethan Dick | 13.700 | 11.800 | 12.600 | 14.000 | 13.350 | ~~10.800~~ | 237.400 |
| 6 | Mikhail Koudinov | 13.600 | 12.350 | 12.900 | 13.900 | 13.750 | 12.800 | 237.400 |
| 6 | Kyleab Ellis | 13.100 | – | – | 14.300 | 13.225 | – | 237.400 |
| 7 | Wales | 40.450 | 38.500 | 38.475 | 40.750 | 38.775 | 38.425 | 235.375 |
| 7 | Clinton Purnell | 12.900 | ~~11.850~~ | 12.875 | 13.800 | 12.700 | 12.500 | 235.375 |
| 7 | Benjamin Eyre | 13.700 | 12.100 | ~~12.050~~ | ~~11.375~~ | ~~11.200~~ | 13.075 | 235.375 |
| 7 | Jac Davies | 13.850 | 14.350 | – | 13.100 | – | – | 235.375 |
| 7 | Iwan Mepham | – | – | 12.500 | – | 13.775 | 12.850 | 235.375 |
| 7 | Josh Cook | ~~12.300~~ | 12.050 | 13.100 | 13.850 | 12.300 | ~~12.350~~ | 235.375 |
| 8 | Singapore | 35.925 | 32.950 | 30.950 | 39.050 | 34.350 | 33.150 | 206.375 |
| 8 | Timothy Tay | 10.375 | 10.500 | 10.850 | 13.200 | 10.850 | 10.800 | 206.375 |
| 8 | Wah Toon Hoe | 13.150 | – | – | ~~12.700~~ | 11.350 | – | 206.375 |
| 8 | Xong Sean Yeo | 12.400 | 12.650 | 9.800 | 13.150 | 12.150 | 11.650 | 206.375 |
| 8 | Aizat Bin Muhammad Jufrie | – | 9.800 | 10.300 | 12.700 | – | 10.700 | 206.375 |
| 9 | India | 25.500 | 23.900 | 37.600 | 26.200 | 38.300 | 22.800 | 174.300 |
| 9 | Ashish Kumar | 13.050 | 11.150 | 11.300 | 13.150 | 12.650 | 10.400 | 174.300 |
| 9 | Rakesh Patra | – | – | 13.950 | – | 13.350 | – | 174.300 |
| 9 | Yogeshwar Singh | 12.450 | 12.750 | 12.350 | 13.050 | 12.300 | 12.400 | 174.300 |

== Qualification results ==
=== Individual all-around ===
The results are as follows:

| Rank | Gymnast | Floor (gymnastics) | Pommel horse | Rings (gymnastics) | Vault (gymnastics) | Parallel bars | Horizontal bar | Total | Notes |
|---|---|---|---|---|---|---|---|---|---|
| 1 | Nile Wilson (ENG) | 14.150 | 12.900 | 14.750 | 14.350 | 14.850 | 15.100 | 86.100 | Q |
| 2 | James Hall (ENG) | 14.050 | 13.950 | 13.900 | 14.250 | 14.250 | 14.450 | 84.850 | Q |
| 3 | Dominick Cunningham (ENG) | 13.950 | 13.200 | 13.400 | 14.850 | 13.500 | 13.600 | 82.500 | – |
| 4 | René Cournoyer (CAN) | 13.600 | 12.650 | 14.200 | 13.550 | 14.250 | 13.850 | 82.100 | Q |
| 5 | Hamish Carter (SCO) | 14.275 | 13.250 | 12.800 | 14.100 | 13.700 | 13.250 | 81.375 | Q |
| 6 | Ilias Georgiou (CYP) | 12.900 | 13.050 | 13.350 | 13.425 | 14.300 | 13.750 | 80.775 | Q |
| 7 | Marios Georgiou (CYP) | 13.950 | 12.900 | 13.750 | 14.300 | 14.150 | 10.950 | 80.000 | Q |
| 8 | Frank Baines (SCO) | 13.725 | 11.700 | 12.625 | 14.100 | 14.050 | 13.300 | 79.500 | Q |
| 9 | Mikhail Koudinov (NZL) | 13.600 | 12.350 | 12.900 | 13.900 | 13.750 | 12.800 | 79.300 | Q |
| 10 | Daniel Purvis (SCO) | 13.850 | 12.250 | 13.550 | 13.100 | 13.550 | 12.950 | 79.250 | – |
| 11 | Michael Tone (AUS) | 11.600 | 13.850 | 13.375 | 13.500 | 12.950 | 13.200 | 78.475 | Q |
| 12 | Reiss Beckford (JAM) | 13.450 | 11.300 | 13.350 | 14.000 | 13.650 | 12.375 | 78.125 | Q |
| 13 | Michael Mercieca (AUS) | 12.950 | 12.050 | 12.900 | 13.450 | 13.600 | 12.850 | 77.800 | Q |
| 14 | Clinton Purnell (WAL) | 12.900 | 11.850 | 12.875 | 13.800 | 12.700 | 12.500 | 76.625 | Q |
| 15 | Rhys McClenaghan (NIR) | 12.250 | 14.550 | 12.250 | 12.950 | 12.850 | 11.750 | 76.600 | Q |
| 16 | Ethan Dick (NZL) | 13.700 | 11.800 | 12.650 | 14.000 | 13.350 | 10.800 | 76.300 | Q |
| 17 | Josh Cook (WAL) | 12.300 | 12.050 | 13.100 | 13.850 | 12.300 | 12.350 | 75.950 | Q |
| 18 | Loo Phay Xing (MAS) | 13.250 | 13.800 | 11.750 | 13.000 | 11.250 | 12.800 | 75.850 | Q |
| 19 | Daniel Lee (JER) | 12.650 | 10.850 | 12.750 | 13.750 | 12.750 | 12.700 | 75.450 | Q |
| 20 | Michalis Krasias (CYP) | 11.600 | 12.550 | 13.000 | 13.400 | 11.750 | 13.050 | 75.350 | – |
| 21 | Yogeshwar Singh (IND) | 12.450 | 12.750 | 12.350 | 13.050 | 12.300 | 12.400 | 75.300 | Q |
| 22 | Benjamin Eyre (WAL) | 13.700 | 12.100 | 12.050 | 11.375 | 11.200 | 13.075 | 73.500 | – |
| 23 | Ewan McAteer (NIR) | 12.850 | 12.450 | 9.650 | 13.700 | 12.600 | 11.750 | 73.000 | R1 |
| 24 | Yeo Xong Sean (SGP) | 12.400 | 12.650 | 9.800 | 13.150 | 12.150 | 11.650 | 71.800 | R2 |
| 25 | Ashish Kumar (IND) | 13.050 | 11.150 | 11.300 | 13.150 | 12.650 | 10.400 | 71.700 | R3 |
| 26 | Joseph Fox (TTO) | 12.375 | 10.200 | 12.450 | 13.100 | 11.050 | 11.500 | 70.675 | R4 |
| 27 | Timothy Tay (SGP) | 10.375 | 10.500 | 10.850 | 13.200 | 10.850 | 10.800 | 66.575 | |

=== Floor ===
The results are as follows:

| Rank | Gymnast | Difficulty | Execution | Penalty | Total | Notes |
|---|---|---|---|---|---|---|
| 1 | Max Whitlock (ENG) | 6.200 | 8.600 | | 14.800 | Q |
| 2 | Scott Morgan (CAN) | 6.100 | 8.350 | | 14.450 | Q |
| 3 | Hamish Carter (SCO) | 5.700 | 8.575 | | 14.275 | Q |
| 4 | Nile Wilson (ENG) | 5.600 | 8.650 | 0.100 | 14.150 | Q |
| 5 | James Hall (ENG) | 5.900 | 8.150 | | 14.050 | – |
| 6 | Marios Georgiou (CYP) | 5.500 | 8.450 | | 13.950 | Q |
| 7 | Dominick Cunningham (ENG) | 6.100 | 7.850 | | 13.950 | – |
| 8 | Daniel Purvis (SCO) | 5.500 | 8.350 | | 13.850 | Q |
| 8 | Jac Davies (WAL) | 5.500 | 8.350 | | 13.850 | Q |
| 10 | Frank Baines (SCO) | 5.700 | 8.025 | | 13.725 | – |
| 11 | Ethan Dick (NZL) | 5.300 | 8.500 | 0.100 | 13.700 | Q |
| 12 | Benjamin Eyre (WAL) | 5.200 | 8.500 | | 13.700 | R1 |
| 13 | Jackson Payne (CAN) | 5.500 | 8.150 | | 13.650 | R2 |
| 14 | Mikhail Koudinov (NZL) | 5.100 | 8.500 | | 13.600 | R3 |
| 15 | René Cournoyer (CAN) | 5.600 | 8.100 | 0.100 | 13.600 | – |
| 16 | Reiss Beckford (JAM) | 5.500 | 8.050 | 0.100 | 13.450 | R4 |
| 17 | David Weir (SCO) | 5.300 | 8.200 | 0.100 | 13.400 | |
| 18 | Cory Paterson (CAN) | 5.200 | 8.200 | | 13.400 | |
| 19 | Loo Phay Xing (MAS) | 5.000 | 8.250 | | 13.250 | |
| 20 | Christopher Remkes (AUS) | 6.200 | 7.150 | 0.100 | 13.250 | |
| 21 | Neofytos Kyriakou (CYP) | 5.200 | 8.050 | 0.100 | 13.150 | |
| 22 | Hoe Wah Toon (SGP) | 5.300 | 7.850 | | 13.150 | |
| 23 | Kyleab Ellis (NZL) | 5.200 | 8.100 | 0.200 | 13.100 | |
| 24 | Ashish Kumar (IND) | 5.700 | 7.550 | 0.200 | 13.050 | |
| 25 | Michael Mercieca (AUS) | 4.700 | 8.250 | | 12.950 | |
| 26 | Ilias Georgiou (CYP) | 4.800 | 8.100 | | 12.900 | |
| 26 | Clinton Purnell (WAL) | 4.800 | 8.100 | | 12.900 | |
| 28 | Ewan McAteer (NIR) | 4.700 | 8.250 | 0.100 | 12.850 | |
| 29 | Daniel Lee (JER) | 4.800 | 7.850 | | 12.650 | |
| 30 | Yogeshwar Singh (IND) | 5.000 | 7.450 | | 12.450 | |
| 31 | Yeo Xong Sean (SGP) | 4.100 | 8.600 | 0.300 | 12.400 | |
| 32 | Joseph Fox (TTO) | 4.500 | 8.075 | 0.200 | 12.375 | |
| 33 | Josh Cook (WAL) | 5.200 | 7.400 | 0.300 | 12.300 | |
| 34 | Rhys McCleanaghan (NIR) | 5.100 | 7.250 | 0.100 | 12.250 | |
| 35 | Tan Fu Jie (MAS) | 3.600 | 8.750 | 0.300 | 12.050 | |
| 36 | Michalis Krasias (CYP) | 4.700 | 7.100 | 0.200 | 11.600 | |
| 37 | Michael Tone (AUS) | 4.600 | 7.000 | | 11.600 | |
| 38 | Devy Dyson (NZL) | 4.200 | 7.350 | 0.400 | 11.150 | |
| 39 | Timothy Tay (SGP) | 4.700 | 6.075 | 0.400 | 10.375 | |
| 40 | Tayo Fakiyesi (NGR) | 3.200 | 5.150 | 0.700 | 7.650 | |

=== Pommel horse ===
The results are as follows:

| Rank | Gymnast | Difficulty | Execution | Penalty | Total | Notes |
|---|---|---|---|---|---|---|
| 1 | Max Whitlock (ENG) | 6.700 | 8.450 | | 15.150 | Q |
| 2 | Rhys McCleanaghan (NIR) | 6.000 | 8.550 | | 14.550 | Q |
| 3 | Jac Davies (WAL) | 6.100 | 8.250 | | 14.350 | Q |
| 4 | Zachary Clay (CAN) | 5.800 | 8.400 | | 14.200 | Q |
| 5 | James Hall (ENG) | 6.100 | 7.850 | | 13.950 | Q |
| 6 | Michael Tone (AUS) | 5.500 | 8.350 | | 13.850 | Q |
| 7 | Loo Phay Xing (MAS) | 5.400 | 8.400 | | 13.800 | Q |
| 8 | Christopher Remkes (AUS) | 5.700 | 8.050 | | 13.750 | Q |
| 9 | Hamish Carter (SCO) | 5.000 | 8.250 | | 13.250 | R1 |
| 10 | Dominick Cunningham (ENG) | 5.100 | 8.100 | | 13.200 | – |
| 11 | Ilias Georgiou (CYP) | 4.500 | 8.550 | | 13.050 | R2 |
| 12 | Nile Wilson (ENG) | 4.000 | 8.900 | | 12.900 | – |
| 13 | Marios Georgiou (CYP) | 5.600 | 7.300 | | 12.900 | R3 |
| 14 | Cory Paterson (CAN) | 5.200 | 7.650 | | 12.850 | R4 |
| 15 | Yogeshwar Singh (IND) | 4.900 | 7.850 | | 12.750 | |
| 16 | Yeo Xong Sean (SGP) | 4.600 | 8.050 | | 12.650 | |
| 17 | René Cournoyer (CAN) | 5.200 | 7.450 | | 12.650 | |
| 18 | Michalis Krasias (CYP) | 5.500 | 7.050 | | 12.550 | |
| 19 | David Bishop (NZL) | 4.000 | 8.500 | | 12.500 | |
| 20 | Ewan McAteer (NIR) | 4.000 | 8.450 | | 12.450 | |
| 21 | Mikhail Koudinov (NZL) | 4.100 | 8.250 | | 12.350 | |
| 22 | Luke Wadsworth (AUS) | 4.800 | 7.500 | | 12.300 | |
| 23 | Daniel Purvis (SCO) | 5.500 | 6.750 | | 12.250 | |
| 24 | Benjamin Eyre (WAL) | 4.300 | 7.800 | | 12.100 | |
| 25 | Josh Cook (WAL) | 4.100 | 7.950 | | 12.050 | |
| 26 | Michael Mercieca (AUS) | 5.100 | 6.950 | | 12.050 | |
| 27 | Jackson Payne (CAN) | 5.500 | 6.550 | | 12.050 | |
| 28 | Clinton Purnell (WAL) | 4.500 | 7.350 | | 11.850 | |
| 29 | Ethan Dick (NZL) | 4.500 | 7.300 | | 11.800 | |
| 30 | Frank Baines (SCO) | 4.900 | 6.800 | | 11.700 | |
| 31 | Tan Fu Jie (MAS) | 5.600 | 5.800 | | 11.400 | |
| 32 | Reiss Beckford (JAM) | 4.700 | 6.600 | | 11.300 | |
| 33 | Ashish Kumar (IND) | 3.200 | 7.950 | | 11.150 | |
| 34 | Neofytos Kyriakou (CYP) | 4.100 | 6.900 | | 11.000 | |
| 35 | Kelvin Cham (SCO) | 4.300 | 6.600 | | 10.900 | |
| 36 | Daniel Lee (JER) | 3.800 | 7.050 | | 10.850 | |
| 37 | Timothy Tay (SGP) | 2.900 | 7.600 | | 10.500 | |
| 38 | Joseph Fox (TTO) | 3.800 | 6.400 | | 10.200 | |
| 39 | Devy Dyson (NZL) | 4.900 | 5.300 | | 10.200 | |
| 40 | Aizat Bin Muhammad Jufrie (SGP) | 2.200 | 7.600 | | 9.800 | |
| 41 | Robert Honiball (NAM) | 3.100 | 4.800 | | 7.900 | |

=== Rings ===
The results are as follows:

| Rank | Gymnast | Difficulty | Execution | Penalty | Total | Notes |
|---|---|---|---|---|---|---|
| 1 | Courtney Tulloch (ENG) | 6.400 | 8.800 | | 15.200 | Q |
| 2 | Nile Wilson (ENG) | 5.900 | 8.850 | | 14.750 | Q |
| 3 | René Cournoyer (CAN) | 5.400 | 8.800 | | 14.200 | Q |
| 4 | Scott Morgan (CAN) | 6.000 | 8.200 | | 14.200 | Q |
| 5 | Zachary Clay (CAN) | 5.400 | 8.550 | | 13.950 | – |
| 6 | Rakesh Patra (IND) | 5.600 | 8.350 | | 13.950 | Q |
| 7 | James Hall (ENG) | 5.600 | 8.300 | | 13.900 | – |
| 8 | Devy Dyson (NZL) | 5.400 | 8.425 | | 13.825 | Q |
| 9 | Marios Georgiou (CYP) | 5.000 | 8.750 | | 13.750 | Q |
| 10 | Daniel Purvis (SCO) | 5.400 | 8.150 | | 13.550 | Q |
| 11 | Dominick Cunningham (ENG) | 5.400 | 8.000 | | 13.400 | – |
| 12 | Michael Tone (AUS) | 5.200 | 8.175 | | 13.375 | R1 |
| 13 | Ilias Georgiou (CYP) | 4.600 | 8.750 | | 13.350 | R2 |
| 14 | Reiss Beckford (JAM) | 5.300 | 8.050 | | 13.350 | R3 |
| 15 | Jackson Payne (CAN) | 5.200 | 8.000 | | 13.200 | – |
| 16 | Luke Wadsworth (AUS) | 4.700 | 8.450 | | 13.150 | R4 |
| 17 | Josh Cook (WAL) | 4.600 | 8.500 | | 13.100 | |
| 18 | Michalis Krasias (CYP) | 4.300 | 8.700 | | 13.000 | |
| 19 | Mikhail Koudinov (NZL) | 4.800 | 8.100 | | 12.900 | |
| 20 | Michael Mercieca (AUS) | 5.400 | 7.500 | | 12.900 | |
| 21 | Clinton Purnell (WAL) | 5.000 | 7.875 | | 12.875 | |
| 22 | Hamish Carter (SCO) | 4.600 | 8.200 | | 12.800 | |
| 23 | Daniel Lee (JER) | 4.100 | 8.650 | | 12.750 | |
| 24 | Ethan Dick (NZL) | 4.200 | 8.450 | | 12.650 | |
| 25 | Frank Baines (SCO) | 4.100 | 8.525 | | 12.625 | |
| 26 | Iwan Mepham (WAL) | 4.900 | 7.600 | | 12.500 | |
| 27 | David Bishop (NZL) | 4.000 | 8.450 | | 12.450 | |
| 27 | Joseph Fox (TTO) | 4.000 | 8.450 | | 12.450 | |
| 29 | Yogeshwar Singh (IND) | 4.200 | 8.150 | | 12.350 | |
| 30 | Rhys McCleanaghan (NIR) | 3.900 | 8.350 | | 12.250 | |
| 31 | Benjamin Eyre (WAL) | 4.100 | 7.950 | | 12.050 | |
| 32 | Loo Phay Xing (MAS) | 4.200 | 7.550 | | 11.750 | |
| 33 | Kelvin Cham (SCO) | 4.600 | 7.100 | | 11.700 | |
| 34 | Ashish Kumar (IND) | 4.400 | 6.900 | | 11.300 | |
| 35 | Timothy Tay (SGP) | 3.300 | 7.550 | | 10.850 | |
| 36 | Aizat Bin Muhammad Jufrie (SGP) | 3.200 | 7.100 | | 10.300 | |
| 37 | Yeo Xong Sean (SGP) | 3.300 | 6.500 | | 9.800 | |
| 38 | Ewan McAteer (NIR) | 3.600 | 6.350 | 0.300 | 9.650 | |
| – | Christopher Remkes (AUS) | DNS | | | | |

=== Vault ===
The results are as follows:

| Rank | Name | D Score | E Score | Pen. | Score 1 | D Score | E Score | Pen. | Score 2 | Total | Qualification |
| Rank | Name | Vault 1 | | | | Vault 2 | | | | Total | Qualification |
|---|---|---|---|---|---|---|---|---|---|---|---|
| 1 | Dominick Cunningham (ENG) | 5.400 | 9.450 | | 14.850 | 5.600 | 9.450 | | 15.050 | 14.950 | Q |
| 1 | Courtney Tulloch (ENG) | 5.600 | 9.250 | | 14.850 | 5.600 | 9.450 | | 15.050 | 14.950 | Q |
| 3 | Christopher Remkes (AUS) | 5.600 | 9.350 | | 14.950 | 5.600 | 9.200 | | 14.800 | 14.875 | Q |
| 4 | Scott Morgan (CAN) | 5.200 | 9.400 | | 14.600 | 4.800 | 9.150 | | 13.950 | 14.275 | Q |
| 5 | Kyleab Ellis (NZL) | 4.800 | 9.500 | | 14.300 | 5.000 | 9.100 | | 14.100 | 14.200 | Q |
| 6 | Marios Georgiou (CYP) | 4.800 | 9.500 | | 14.300 | 4.400 | 9.550 | | 13.950 | 14.125 | Q |
| 7 | René Cournoyer (CAN) | 5.200 | 8.650 | 0.300 | 13.550 | 4.800 | 9.400 | | 14.200 | 13.875 | Q |
| 8 | Neofytos Kyriakou (CYP) | 4.800 | 9.150 | | 13.950 | 4.400 | 9.300 | | 13.700 | 13.825 | Q |
| 9 | Hamish Carter (SCO) | 4.800 | 9.300 | | 14.100 | 4.000 | 9.250 | | 13.250 | 13.675 | R1 |
| 10 | David Bishop (NZL) | 4.400 | 9.400 | | 13.800 | 4.800 | 8.800 | 0.300 | 13.300 | 13.550 | R2 |
| 11 | Yogeshwar Singh (IND) | 5.200 | 8.150 | 0.300 | 13.050 | 4.800 | 9.100 | | 13.900 | 13.475 | R3 |
| 12 | Clinton Purnell (WAL) | 4.800 | 9.000 | | 13.800 | 4.000 | 9.100 | | 13.100 | 13.450 | R4 |
| 13 | Ewan McAteer (NIR) | 4.800 | 9.000 | 0.100 | 13.700 | 4.000 | 9.300 | 0.100 | 13.200 | 13.450 | |
| 14 | Hoe Wah Toon (SGP) | 5.200 | 7.800 | 0.300 | 12.700 | 4.800 | 9.100 | | 13.900 | 13.300 | |
| 15 | Ashish Kumar (IND) | 5.200 | 8.050 | 0.100 | 13.150 | 5.200 | 8.050 | | 13.250 | 13.200 | |
| 16 | Aizat Bin Muhammad Jufrie (SGP) | 5.200 | 7.800 | 0.300 | 12.700 | 4.800 | 8.000 | | 12.800 | 12.750 | |
| 17 | Tayo Fakiyesi (NGR) | 4.800 | 8.350 | 0.100 | 13.050 | 4.400 | 7.800 | 0.300 | 11.900 | 12.475 | |

=== Parallel bars ===
The results are as follows:

| Rank | Gymnast | Difficulty | Execution | Penalty | Total | Notes |
|---|---|---|---|---|---|---|
| 1 | Nile Wilson (ENG) | 6.500 | 8.350 | | 14.850 | Q |
| 2 | Ilias Georgiou (CYP) | 5.400 | 8.900 | | 14.300 | Q |
| 3 | René Cournoyer (CAN) | 5.500 | 8.750 | | 14.250 | Q |
| 4 | James Hall (ENG) | 6.000 | 8.250 | | 14.250 | Q |
| 5 | Marios Georgiou (CYP) | 6.000 | 8.150 | | 14.150 | Q |
| 6 | Frank Baines (SCO) | 5.500 | 8.550 | | 14.050 | Q |
| 7 | Cory Paterson (CAN) | 5.500 | 8.500 | | 14.000 | Q |
| 8 | Jackson Payne (CAN) | 6.000 | 7.950 | | 13.950 | – |
| 9 | Iwan Mepham (WAL) | 5.000 | 8.775 | | 13.775 | Q |
| 10 | Mikhail Koudinov (NZL) | 5.500 | 8.250 | | 13.750 | R1 |
| 11 | Mitchell Morgans (AUS) | 5.100 | 8.600 | | 13.700 | R2 |
| 12 | Hamish Carter (SCO) | 5.200 | 8.500 | | 13.700 | R3 |
| 13 | Reiss Beckford (JAM) | 5.400 | 8.250 | | 13.650 | R4 |
| 14 | Michael Mercieca (AUS) | 5.400 | 8.200 | | 13.600 | |
| 15 | Daniel Purvis (SCO) | 5.700 | 7.850 | | 13.550 | |
| 16 | Dominick Cunningham (ENG) | 5.500 | 8.000 | | 13.500 | |
| 17 | Ethan Dick (NZL) | 4.700 | 8.650 | | 13.350 | |
| 18 | Rakesh Patra (IND) | 5.300 | 8.050 | | 13.350 | |
| 19 | Luke Wadsworth (AUS) | 4.900 | 8.350 | | 13.250 | |
| 20 | Kyleab Ellis (NZL) | 4.300 | 8.925 | | 13.225 | |
| 21 | Courtney Tulloch (ENG) | 5.300 | 7.750 | | 13.050 | |
| 22 | Michael Tone (AUS) | 4.500 | 8.450 | | 12.950 | |
| 23 | David Weir (SCO) | 4.600 | 8.250 | | 12.850 | |
| 24 | Rhys McCleanaghan (NIR) | 5.100 | 7.750 | | 12.850 | |
| 25 | Devy Dyson (NZL) | 4.900 | 7.900 | | 12.800 | |
| 26 | Zachary Clay (CAN) | 5.500 | 7.300 | | 12.800 | |
| 27 | Daniel Lee (JER) | 3.900 | 8.850 | | 12.750 | |
| 28 | Clinton Purnell (WAL) | 4.300 | 8.400 | | 12.700 | |
| 29 | Ashish Kumar (IND) | 4.600 | 8.050 | | 12.650 | |
| 30 | Ewan McAteer (NIR) | 4.500 | 8.100 | | 12.600 | |
| 31 | Neofytos Kyriakou (CYP) | 3.800 | 8.600 | | 12.400 | |
| 32 | Josh Cook (WAL) | 4.400 | 7.900 | | 12.300 | |
| 33 | Yogeshwar Singh (IND) | 4.500 | 7.800 | | 12.300 | |
| 34 | Yeo Xong Sean (SGP) | 4.000 | 8.150 | | 12.150 | |
| 35 | Michalis Krasias (CYP) | 4.500 | 7.250 | | 11.750 | |
| 36 | Hoe Wah Toon (SGP) | 2.800 | 8.550 | | 11.350 | |
| 37 | Loo Phay Xing (MAS) | 4.000 | 7.250 | | 11.250 | |
| 38 | Benjamin Eyre (WAL) | 3.900 | 7.300 | | 11.200 | |
| 39 | Joseph Fox (TTO) | 4.800 | 6.250 | | 11.050 | |
| 40 | Timothy Tay (SGP) | 3.800 | 7.050 | | 10.850 | |
| 41 | Robert Honiball (NAM) | 2.700 | 7.150 | | 9.850 | |

=== Horizontal bar ===
The results are as follows:

| Rank | Gymnast | Difficulty | Execution | Penalty | Total | Notes |
|---|---|---|---|---|---|---|
| 1 | Nile Wilson (ENG) | 6.200 | 8.900 | | 15.100 | Q |
| 2 | James Hall (ENG) | 6.000 | 8.450 | | 14.450 | Q |
| 3 | Cory Paterson (CAN) | 5.600 | 8.400 | | 14.000 | Q |
| 4 | René Cournoyer (CAN) | 5.100 | 8.750 | | 13.850 | Q |
| 5 | Ilias Georgiou (CYP) | 5.100 | 8.650 | | 13.750 | Q |
| 6 | Dominick Cunningham (ENG) | 5.400 | 8.200 | | 13.600 | – |
| 7 | Frank Baines (SCO) | 4.700 | 8.600 | | 13.300 | Q |
| 8 | Hamish Carter (SCO) | 5.100 | 8.150 | | 13.250 | Q |
| 9 | Jackson Payne (CAN) | 6.000 | 7.250 | | 13.250 | – |
| 10 | Michael Tone (AUS) | 4.500 | 8.700 | | 13.200 | Q |
| 11 | Devy Dyson (NZL) | 4.900 | 8.300 | | 13.200 | R1 |
| 12 | Benjamin Eyre (WAL) | 4.800 | 8.275 | | 13.075 | R2 |
| 13 | Michalis Krasias (CYP) | 4.400 | 8.650 | | 13.050 | R3 |
| 14 | Daniel Purvis (SCO) | 5.600 | 7.350 | | 12.950 | – |
| 15 | Iwan Mepham (WAL) | 5.100 | 7.750 | | 12.850 | R4 |
| 16 | Michael Mercieca (AUS) | 5.500 | 7.350 | | 12.850 | |
| 17 | Loo Phay Xing (MAS) | 4.200 | 8.600 | | 12.800 | |
| 18 | Mikhail Koudinov (NZL) | 4.900 | 7.900 | | 12.800 | |
| 19 | David Weir (SCO) | 4.200 | 8.500 | | 12.700 | |
| 20 | Daniel Lee (JER) | 4.400 | 8.300 | | 12.700 | |
| 21 | Clinton Purnell (WAL) | 4.800 | 7.700 | | 12.500 | |
| 22 | Mitchell Morgans (AUS) | 6.000 | 6.500 | | 12.500 | |
| 23 | David Bishop (NZL) | 4.900 | 7.550 | | 12.450 | |
| 24 | Yogeshwar Singh (IND) | 4.400 | 8.000 | | 12.400 | |
| 25 | Reiss Beckford (JAM) | 4.300 | 8.075 | | 12.375 | |
| 26 | Josh Cook (WAL) | 4.900 | 7.450 | | 12.350 | |
| 27 | Neofytos Kyriakou (CYP) | 3.400 | 8.650 | | 12.050 | |
| 28 | Ewan McAteer (NIR) | 3.500 | 8.250 | | 11.750 | |
| 29 | Rhys McCleanaghan (NIR) | 4.000 | 7.750 | | 11.750 | |
| 30 | Luke Wadsworth (AUS) | 4.400 | 7.250 | | 11.650 | |
| 31 | Yeo Xong Sean (SGP) | 4.600 | 7.050 | | 11.650 | |
| 32 | Joseph Fox (TTO) | 3.900 | 7.600 | | 11.500 | |
| 33 | Marios Georgiou (CYP) | 5.100 | 5.850 | | 10.950 | |
| 34 | Timothy Tay (SGP) | 3.400 | 7.400 | | 10.800 | |
| 35 | Ethan Dick (NZL) | 3.900 | 6.900 | | 10.800 | |
| 36 | Aizat Bin Muhammad Jufrie (SGP) | 3.500 | 7.200 | | 10.700 | |
| 37 | Zachary Clay (CAN) | 5.100 | 5.450 | | 10.550 | |
| 38 | Ashish Kumar (IND) | 4.300 | 6.100 | | 10.400 | |
| – | Robert Honiball (NAM) | DNS | | | | |
