= 2014 Junior Pan American Artistic Gymnastics Championships =

International sports competition

Junior Pan American Artistic Gymnastics Championships
- Location: Aracaju, Brazil
- Date: March 26–30, 2014

The 2014 Junior Pan American Artistic Gymnastics Championships was held in Aracaju, Brazil, March 26–30, 2014.

== Medal summary ==
| Event | Gold | Silver | Bronze |
|---|---|---|---|
Women
| Team | Canada; Megan Roberts; Shallon Olsen; Sydney Townsend; Rose-Kaying Woo | Brazil; Rebeca Andrade; Lorenna Rocha; Flávia Saraiva; Milena Theodoro | Mexico; Nicolle Castro; Stephanie Hernandez; Cinthia Ruiz; Karla Vielma |
| All Around | Flávia Saraiva (BRA) | Rebeca Andrade (BRA) | Rose-Kaying Woo (CAN) |
| Vault | Rebeca Andrade (BRA) | Shallon Olsen (CAN) | Nicolle Castro (MEX) |
| Uneven bars | Rebeca Andrade (BRA) | Rose-Kaying Woo (CAN) | Flávia Saraiva (BRA) |
| Balance beam | Rebeca Andrade (BRA) | Rose-Kaying Woo (CAN) | Flávia Saraiva (BRA) |
| Floor exercise | Flávia Saraiva (BRA) | Rebeca Andrade (BRA) | Rose-Kaying Woo (CAN) |
Men
| Team | United States; Davis Grooms; Marty Strech; Matthew Wenske; Alec Yoder | Brazil; Lucas Cardoso; Gabriel Farias; Luís Guilherme Porto; Yannick Santos | Canada; René Cournoyer; Justin Karstadt; Anthony Tawfik; Samuel Zakutney |
| All Around | Marty Strech (USA) | Alec Yoder (USA) | Lucas Cardoso (BRA) |
| Floor exercise | René Cournoyer (CAN) | Lucas Cardoso (BRA) | Matthew Wenske (USA) |
| Pommel horse | Alec Yoder (USA) | Justin Karstadt (CAN) | Davis Grooms (USA) |
| Rings | Alec Yoder (USA) | Matthew Wenske (USA) | Gabriel Farias (BRA) |
| Vault | Luís Guilherme Porto (BRA) | René Cournoyer (CAN) | Matthew Wenske (USA) |
| Parallel bars | Alec Yoder (USA) | Dilan Jimenez (COL) | Andres Perez (PUR) |
| Horizontal bar | Victor Espinoza (GUA) | Davis Grooms (USA) | Gabriel Farias (BRA) |

== Medal table ==
| Rank | Nation | Gold | Silver | Bronze | Total |
|---|---|---|---|---|---|
| 1 | Brazil (BRA) | 6 | 5 | 5 | 16 |
| 2 | United States (USA) | 5 | 3 | 3 | 11 |
| 3 | Canada (CAN) | 2 | 5 | 3 | 10 |
| 4 | Guatemala (GUA) | 1 | 0 | 0 | 1 |
| 5 | Colombia (COL) | 0 | 1 | 0 | 1 |
| 6 | Mexico (MEX) | 0 | 0 | 2 | 2 |
| 7 | Cuba (CUB) | 0 | 0 | 1 | 1 |
| 7 | Puerto Rico (PUR) | 0 | 0 | 1 | 1 |
| Totals (8 entries) | | 14 | 14 | 15 | 43 |
