= Rebecca Sereda =

American rhythmic gymnast

- Nickname: Becca
- Born: May 5, 1996 (age 30) Brooklyn, New York, U.S.

Gymnastics career
- Discipline: Rhythmic gymnastics
- Country represented: United States (2009-2015)
- Club: Isadora
- Head coach: Natalya Kiriyenko
- Assistant coaches: Irina Khamidullina, Shayna Jav
- Retired: yes
Medal record
Rhythmic gymnastics
Representing United States
Pan American Championships
Gold medal – first place	2014 Mississauga	Team
Silver medal – second place	2014 Mississauga	All-Around
Junior Pan American Championships
Gold medal – first place	2009 Havana	Team
Gold medal – first place	2009 Havana	All-Around
Gold medal – first place	2009 Havana	Rope
Gold medal – first place	2009 Havana	Hoop
Gold medal – first place	2009 Havana	Ball

Rebecca Sereda (born May 5, 1996) is a retired American rhythmic gymnast. She represented her country in international competitions.

== Career ==
Rebecca took up gymnastics in 2002 at age six after her mother saw an advertisement in a newspaper.

In 2009, she entered the national team in her first year as a junior, making her international debut at the Deleanu Cup in Bucharest, being 1st with rope, 2nd with ball, 3rd in the All-Around, 4th with clubs, and 6th with hoop. A week later she competed in junior tournament of the World Cup in Pesaro, she was 4th overall, with rope and with ball, 5th with hoop and 6th with clubs. At the Chicago Cup she won gold in the All-Around, with rope and with hoop as well as silver with ball and clubs. She was then selected for the Junior Pan American Championships in Havana, where she won gold in teams (along Polina Kozitskiy and Alexis Page), the All-Around, rope, hoop and ball.

In early 2010 she was 7th with rope in the 24th Portimão Junior Rhythmic Gymnastics Tournament and 9th overall at the Deriugina Cup. She then took 5th place at the Crystal Rose tournament in Minsk and won gold in the All-Around and silver with ball at the Chicago Cup. In August she competed in the Visa Championships, winning gold overall and in all event finals.

In the following seasong she debuted at the 2011 Rhythmic Challenge in Colorado Springs, getting gold in the All-Around, with hoop and with ball, silver with clubs and bronze with ribbon. Two weeks later she took part in the junior event of the World Cup in Pesaro, where she took 8th place with clubs, 5th place overall, 4th place with hoop and won silver in the ball final behind Yana Kudryavtseva. In April she won bronze in the All-Around, silver with hoop and clubs and gold with hoop at the Irina Deleanu Cup. A month later she won silver in the All-Around at the Baltic Cup Tournament in Rumia. A the U.S. Rhythmic Classics she was 2nd overall and won gold in all event finals. In August she competed in the Visa Championships where she won gold in the All-Around, with ball and with clubs.

Sereda became a senior in 2012, earning a silver medal in her debut at the Rhythmic Challenge. That year she also won bronze at the Moscow Senior Tournament, in June she won bronze with hoop, silver with ribbon and gold in the All-Around, with ball and with clubs at the USA Championships.

In February 2013 she was 4th with ball, 5th with hoop and 6th with clubs at the Rhythmic Challenge. In May she made her World Cup debut in Corbeil-Essonnes where she took 13th place in the All-Around and was 7th in the ribbon final. The following month she won gold in the All-Around, with ball, clubs and ribbon as well as bronze with hoop at nationals. She was then selected for her maiden World Championships in Kyiv, being 24th in the All-Around, 22nd with hoop, 17th with ball, 18th with clubs and 31st with ribbon.

In 2014, she took part in the Rhythmic Challenge, winning gold in the All-Around and with clubs, as well as bronze with hoop and ribbon. In March she participated in the World Cup in Stuttgart, placing 26th. In July she tied with Jasmine Kerber for All-Around's gold at the USA Championships, she then won two more golds with hoop and ball as well as silver with ribbon. A month later she competed in the Pan American Championships in Mississauga, Ontario, where she won gold in team with Jasmine Kerber, Serena Lu and Aliya Protto, and silver in the All-Around. In September she was selected for the World Championships in Izmir, finishing 12th in teams. 34th in the All-Around, 61st with hoop, 46th with ball, 23rd with clubs and 26th with ribbon.

In April 2015 Rebecca retired from the sport due to an ongoing back complaint that had been plaguing her since 2012; she has been diagnosed with a variety of conditions, including herniated discs and arthritis.
