= 2009 Junior Pan American Rhythmic Gymnastics Championships =

International sports competition

The 2009 Junior Pan American Rhythmic Gymnastics Championships were held in Havana, Cuba from November 10–15, 2009.

== Medal summary ==
Event	Gold	Silver	Bronze
Team	United States; Rebecca Sereda; Polina Kozitskiy; Alexis Page	Canada; Maria Kitkarska; Kaitlyn James; Elisabeth Kazakov; Amanda Cha	Mexico; Isha Sánchez Hernández; Patricia Arredondo; Rebeca Martinez
Individual all-around	Rebecca Sereda (USA)	Polina Kozitskiy (USA)	Maria Kitkarska (CAN)
Rope	Rebecca Sereda (USA)	Polina Kozitskiy (USA)	Maria Kitkarska (CAN)
Hoop	Rebecca Sereda (USA)	Polina Kozitskiy (USA)	Kaitlyn James (CAN)
Ball	Rebecca Sereda (USA)	Maria Kitkarska (CAN)	Isha Sánchez Hernández (MEX)
Clubs	Polina Kozitskiy (USA)	Emanuelle Lima (BRA)	Maria Kitkarska (CAN)
Group all-around	Canada	Brazil	Cuba
4 hoops	Canada	United States	Brazil
4 ribbons	Canada	Cuba	United States

== Medal table ==
Rank	Nation	Gold	Silver	Bronze	Total
1	United States	6	4	1	11
2	Canada	3	2	4	9
3	Brazil	0	2	1	3
4	Cuba	0	1	1	2
5	Mexico	0	0	2	2
Totals (5 entries)		9	9	9	27
