= Gymnastics at the 2018 Commonwealth Games – Men's pommel horse =

Men's pommel horse at the 2018 Commonwealth Games
- Venue: Coomera Indoor Sports Centre
- Dates: 5 April 2018 (qualification); 8 April 2018 (final)
- Competitors: 8 from 6 nations
- Winning score: 15.100

Medalists
gold medal	Rhys McClenaghan	Northern Ireland
silver medal	Max Whitlock	England
bronze medal	Zachary Clay	Canada

The Men's pommel horse gymnastics competition at the 2018 Commonwealth Games in Gold Coast, Australia was held on 8 April 2018 at the Coomera Indoor Sports Centre.

== Schedule ==
The schedule is as follows:

All times are Australian Eastern Standard Time (UTC+10:00)

Date	Time	Round
Thursday 5 April 2018	09:08	Qualification
Saturday 8 April 2018	15:27	Final

== Results ==
=== Qualification ===
Qualification for this apparatus final was determined within the team final.

=== Final ===
The results are as follows:

Rank	Gymnast	Difficulty	Execution	Penalty	Total
1st place, gold medalist(s)	Rhys McClenaghan (NIR)	6.500	8.600		15.100
2nd place, silver medalist(s)	Max Whitlock (ENG)	6.800	8.300		15.100
3rd place, bronze medalist(s)	Zachary Clay (CAN)	5.800	8.500		14.300
4	Jac Davies (WAL)	6.100	8.133		14.233
5	James Hall (ENG)	6.100	7.966		14.066
6	Christopher Remkes (AUS)	5.800	7.933		13.733
7	Michael Tone (AUS)	5.400	7.033		12.433
8	Loo Phay Xing (MAS)	5.800	5.966		11.766
