= René Cournoyer =

Canadian artistic gymnast

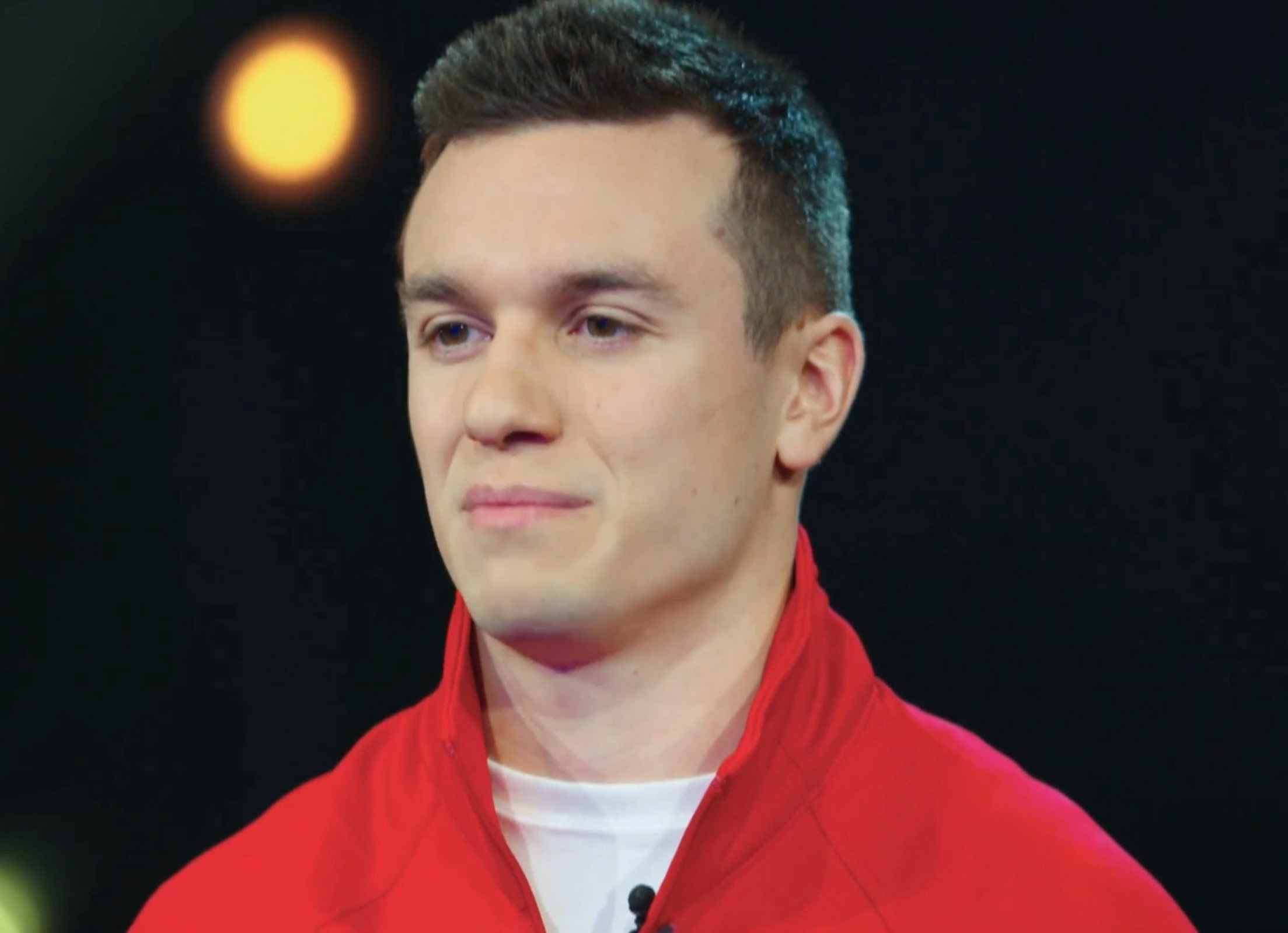
- Cournoyer in 2021

Personal information
- Born: April 23, 1997 (age 29) Repentigny, Quebec, Canada
- Height: 165 cm (5 ft 5 in)

Gymnastics career
- Discipline: Men's artistic gymnastics
- Country represented: Canada; (2013–present)
- Club: Club Gymnika
- Head coach: Jean-Sebastien Tougas
Medal record
Representing Canada
Commonwealth Games
Gold medal – first place	2026 Glasgow	Team
Silver medal – second place	2018 Gold Coast	Team
Silver medal – second place	2026 Glasgow	Floor exercise
Pan American Games
Silver medal – second place	2023 Santiago	Team
Bronze medal – third place	2019 Lima	Team
Bronze medal – third place	2023 Santiago	Horizontal bar
Pan American Championships
Gold medal – first place	2026 Rio de Janeiro	Team
Silver medal – second place	2018 Lima	All-around
Silver medal – second place	2025 Panama City	Team
Pacific Rim Championships
Silver medal – second place	2024 Cali	Team
Silver medal – second place	2024 Cali	Horizontal bar
Bronze medal – third place	2024 Cali	All-around
Bronze medal – third place	2024 Cali	Parallel bars
FIG World Cup
Event	1st	2nd	3rd
World Challenge Cup	1	0	0
Total	1	0	0

René Cournoyer (born April 23, 1997) is a Canadian artistic gymnast. He represented Canada at the 2020 and 2024 Olympic Games as well as the 2014 Youth Olympic Games.

== Gymnastics career ==
=== 2014 ===
Cournoyer made his international debut at the 2014 Junior Pan American Championships where he helped Canada finish third as a team, and individually he won gold on floor exercise and silver on vault. He next competed at the Pacific Rim Championships where he once again helped Canada win the bronze medal.

In August Cournoyer competed at the 2014 Youth Olympics in Nanjing, China. While there he placed 19th in the all-around during qualifications and was the first reserve for the final. He did qualify to the vault and horizontal bar finals. During event finals, Cournoyer placed sixth on vault and seventh on horizontal bar.

=== 2015–2016 ===
Cournoyer was selected to make his senior international debut at the 2015 Pan American Games in Toronto. While there, he helped the Canadian team finish fourth; individually he placed eleventh in the all-around and seventh on pommel horse. Cournoyer next competed at the 2015 World Championships where he helped Canada finish 15th during qualifications.

At the 2016 Olympic Test Event, Cournoyer helped Canada finish eighth as a team; however, Canada was unable to earn a team berth to the 2016 Olympic Games.

=== 2017–2021 ===
In May 2017 Cournoyer competed at the World Challenge Cups in Koper and Osijek. Later that summer he competed at the 2017 Summer Universiade where he finished 11th in the all-around.

Cournoyer was selected to represent Canada at the 2018 Commonwealth Games alongside Cory Paterson, Jackson Payne, Scott Morgan, and Zachary Clay. Together they won silver behind England. Individually, he placed seventh in the all-around, sixth on horizontal bar, and fourth on rings, vault, and parallel bars. Cournoyer competed at the 2018 Pan American Championships where he won silver in the all-around behind Manrique Larduet of Cuba.

At the 2018 World Championships, Cournoyer helped Canada finish 18th during qualifications. Individually, he finished 23rd during qualifications, which qualified him to the all-around final; however, he withdrew due to an injury to his abdominal muscle.

Cournoyer competed at the 2019 Pan American Games alongside Zachary Clay, Justin Karstadt, Cory Paterson, and Samuel Zakutney. Together they won bronze as a team behind Brazil and the United States.

At the 2019 World Championships, Cournoyer helped Canada finish 17th during qualifications, and individually he finished 43rd in the all-around during qualifications. Although Canada did not qualify a team to the 2020 Olympic Games, Cournoyer qualified as an individual due to being the highest placing Canadian athlete and being one of the top finishing all-around not part of a qualified team.

In early 2020, Cournoyer competed at the American Cup where he finished tenth. This would be Cournoyer's only competition of the year due to many events, including the Olympic Games, being postponed or canceled due to the global COVID-19 pandemic.

In 2021, Cournoyer competed at the postponed 2020 Olympic Games. He finished 55th in the all-around during qualifications.

=== 2022–2024 ===
Cournoyer was selected to represent Canada at the 2022 Commonwealth Games alongside Félix Dolci, Mathys Jalbert, Chris Kaji, and Jayson Rampersad. However, prior to competition Cournoyer tore his ACL.

Cournoyer was able to make a comeback the following year and was selected to compete at the 2023 World Championships alongside Zachary Clay, Félix Dolci, William Emard, and Jayson Rampersad. During qualifications he helped Canada finish fourth, which qualified Canada a team berth to the 2024 Olympic Games, a feat last achieved by the Canadian men's gymnastics team in 2008. Additionally he qualified to the all-around final. During the team final, Cournoyer contributed scores on all six apparatuses towards Canada's seventh place finish. During the all-around final, he finished twelfth.

Cournoyer next competed at the Pan American Games. On the first day of competition he helped the Canadian team win the silver medal behind the United States. Additionally he qualified to the floor exercise, rings, and horizontal bar finals. On the first day of event finals, he placed seventh on floor exercise and sixth on rings. On the final day, he won bronze on horizontal bar behind Brazilians Arthur Mariano and Bernardo Miranda.

Cournoyer was named to the team to represent Canada at the 2024 Summer Olympics alongside Zachary Clay, Félix Dolci, William Émard, and Samuel Zakutney. While there he helped Canada finish eighth as a team. Individually, he finished seventeenth in the all-around.

=== 2025–2026 ===
At the 2026 Pan American Championships, Cournoyer helped Canada win their first-ever Pan American team gold medal. He competed at the 2026 Commonwealth Games alongside Jordan Carroll, William Émard, Félix Dolci, and Ethan Ikeda. Together they won gold as a team, Canada's first Commonwealth men's team gold in twenty years. Individually Cournoyer qualified to floor exercise final where he won silver behind Luke Whitehouse.

Cournoyer was selected to represent Canada at the 2026 World Championships alongside Carroll, Dolci, Xavier Olasz, and Samuel Zakutney.

== Competitive history ==
Competitive history of René Cournoyer at the junior level
Year	Event	Team	AA	FX	PH	SR	VT	PB	HB
2013	Elite Canada		1st place, gold medalist(s)	2nd place, silver medalist(s)	1st place, gold medalist(s)	3rd place, bronze medalist(s)	3rd place, bronze medalist(s)	3rd place, bronze medalist(s)	
2013	Canadian Championships								1st place, gold medalist(s)
2014	Elite Canada		2nd place, silver medalist(s)	2nd place, silver medalist(s)			2nd place, silver medalist(s)		
2014	Pan American Championships	3rd place, bronze medalist(s)	6	1st place, gold medalist(s)			2nd place, silver medalist(s)	7	
2014	Pacific Rim Championships	3rd place, bronze medalist(s)							
2014	Canadian Championships		3rd place, bronze medalist(s)						
2014	Youth Olympic Games		19				6		7

Competitive history of René Cournoyer at the senior level
Year	Event	Team	AA	FX	PH	SR	VT	PB	HB
2015	Elite Canada		2nd place, silver medalist(s)	1st place, gold medalist(s)			3rd place, bronze medalist(s)		
2015	Canadian Championships		2nd place, silver medalist(s)			3rd place, bronze medalist(s)			
2015	Pan American Games	4	11		7				
2015	World Championships	15							
2016	Elite Canada		1st place, gold medalist(s)			1st place, gold medalist(s)			
2016	Olympic Test Event	8							
2016	Canadian Championships		3rd place, bronze medalist(s)	5	8	2nd place, silver medalist(s)	4	4	
2017	UCIC Calgary					1st place, gold medalist(s)		1st place, gold medalist(s)	1st place, gold medalist(s)
2017	Koper Challenge Cup					5		4	
2017	Osijek Challenge Cup				6				
2017	Canadian Championships		4		5		3rd place, bronze medalist(s)		
2017	Summer Universiade		11						
2017	Szombathely Challenge Cup					8			6
2017	World Championships						23		
2018	Elite Canada		1st place, gold medalist(s)	8	2nd place, silver medalist(s)	3rd place, bronze medalist(s)		1st place, gold medalist(s)	5
2018	UCIC Calgary		1st place, gold medalist(s)	2nd place, silver medalist(s)	2nd place, silver medalist(s)	5		1st place, gold medalist(s)	
2018	Commonwealth Games	2nd place, silver medalist(s)	7			4	4	4	6
2018	Canadian Championships		1st place, gold medalist(s)	3rd place, bronze medalist(s)	3rd place, bronze medalist(s)	3rd place, bronze medalist(s)	1st place, gold medalist(s)	3rd place, bronze medalist(s)	3rd place, bronze medalist(s)
2018	Guimarães Challenge Cup						8		8
2018	Mersin Challenge Cup					6	1st place, gold medalist(s)		
2018	Pan American Championships	5	2nd place, silver medalist(s)		6			8	8
2018	World Championships	18	WD						
2019	Elite Canada				5	3rd place, bronze medalist(s)			
2019	Canadian Championships		2nd place, silver medalist(s)	6	7	2nd place, silver medalist(s)			7
2019	Pan American Games	3rd place, bronze medalist(s)	4			6			5
2019	World Championships	17	43						
2019	Swiss Cup	9							
2020	American Cup		10						
2021
2021	Olympic Games		55						
2021	World Championships							27	
2022	Canadian Championships		6	2nd place, silver medalist(s)		6			5
2023	Canadian Championships								3rd place, bronze medalist(s)
2023	RomGym Trophy	2nd place, silver medalist(s)	4					6	2nd place, silver medalist(s)
2023	World Championships	7	12						
2023	Pan American Games	2nd place, silver medalist(s)		7		6			3rd place, bronze medalist(s)
2024	Elite Canada		2nd place, silver medalist(s)	12	7	3rd place, bronze medalist(s)	4	3rd place, bronze medalist(s)	6
2024	DTB Pokal Team Challenge	11							
2024	Pacific Rim Championships	2nd place, silver medalist(s)	3rd place, bronze medalist(s)			5		3rd place, bronze medalist(s)	2nd place, silver medalist(s)
2024	Canadian Championships		2nd place, silver medalist(s)	3rd place, bronze medalist(s)	6	2nd place, silver medalist(s)		4	2nd place, silver medalist(s)
2024	RomGym Trophy		2nd place, silver medalist(s)		8	1st place, gold medalist(s)		3rd place, bronze medalist(s)	
2024	Olympic Games	8	17						
2025
2025	Pan American Championships	2nd place, silver medalist(s)	4	4	7				
2025	World Championships							30	12
2026	Elite Canada		3rd place, bronze medalist(s)	4		3rd place, bronze medalist(s)		4	1st place, gold medalist(s)
2026	Canadian Championships		2nd place, silver medalist(s)	3rd place, bronze medalist(s)		3rd place, bronze medalist(s)		1st place, gold medalist(s)	2nd place, silver medalist(s)
2026	Pan American Championships	1st place, gold medalist(s)	4	5	6			5	8
2026	Commonwealth Games	1st place, gold medalist(s)		2nd place, silver medalist(s)					
2026	World Championships	13							
