= Maria Kitkarska =

Bulgarian-born Canadian rhythmic gymnast

- Full name: Maria Kitkarska
- Born: 13 July 1995 (age 31) Sofia, Bulgaria
- Height: 170 cm (5 ft 7 in)

Gymnastics career
- Discipline: Rhythmic gymnastics
- Country represented: Canada
- Club: Questo
- Assistant coach: Lidia Joukova
- Retired: 2014
Medal record
Representing Canada
Rhythmic Gymnastics
Commonwealth Games
Gold medal – first place	2014 Glasgow	Team
Pacific Rim Championships
Silver medal – second place	2014 Richmond	Team

Maria Kitkarska (Bulgarian: Мария Киткарска) (born 13 July 1995 in Sofia, Bulgaria) is a Canadian former individual rhythmic gymnast. She is the 2010 Canadian junior all-around champion and 2012 Canadian senior all-around champion.

== Career ==
Kitkarska began rhythmic gymnastics in 2005. She competed at the 2009 Junior Pan American Championships, where she won bronze in the all-around as well as three medals in the event finals: silver with ball and bronze with clubs and rope.

In 2010, she became the Canadian junior champion. She competed at the 2010 Youth Olympic Games, finishing 11th in qualifications.

The next year, she debuted as a senior. She was one of eight athletes to receive a scholarship for athletes in circus-related sports from Cirque du Soleil. In September, she competed at the 2011 World Championships in Montpellier, France, where she finished 80th in the all-around. In October, she placed 6th at the 2011 Pan American Games.

She received a second scholarship from Cirque du Soleil in 2012, and that year, she became the Canadian senior champion.

In 2014, Kitkarska again received a Cirque due Soleil scholarship. She competed with her teammates, Patricia Bezzoubenko and Annabelle Kovacs, and the Canadian junior team at the 2014 Pacific Rim Championships, where they won the team silver medal. Individually, Kitkarska placed 5th and qualified for three event finals.

Kitkarska was named a member of the Canadian team (along with Bezzoubenko and Kovacs) for the 2014 Commonwealth Games in Glasgow, which took place in August. Ahead of the Games, they trained together in Spain. She and her teammates won gold together in the team event. Individually, Kitkarska finished 8th in the all-around finals and qualified to three apparatus finals. In September, she competed at the 2014 World Championships, where she finished in 78th place.

== Personal life ==
Kitkarska was born in Sofia, Bulgaria. At around age four, she moved to Montreal, where her mother taught English. She has a younger sister and speaks four languages: French, Bulgarian, English, and Spanish.
