= Gymnastics at the 2023 Pan American Games – Men's pommel horse =

Men's pommel horse at the 2023 Pan American Games
- Venue: Training Center for Collective Sport
- Dates: October 24
- Competitors: 8 from 5 nations
- Winning score: 14.400

Medalists
Gold medal	Zachary Clay	Canada
Silver medal	Jayson Rampersad	Canada
Bronze medal	Nelson Guilbe	Puerto Rico

The men's pommel horse gymnastic event at the 2023 Pan American Games was held on October 24 at the Training Center for Collective Sport. Zachary Clay became the first Canadian to win a pommel horse title at the Pan American Games.

== Results ==
=== Final ===
Rank	Gymnast	D Score	E Score	Pen.	Total
1st place, gold medalist(s)	Zachary Clay (CAN)	5.7	8.700		14.400
2nd place, silver medalist(s)	Jayson Rampersad (CAN)	6.0	8.333		14.333
3rd place, bronze medalist(s)	Nelson Guilbe (PUR)	5.8	8.533		14.133
4	Cameron Bock (USA)	5.4	8.533		13.933
5	Stephen Nedoroscik (USA)	6.6	7.166		13.766
6	Luca Alfieri (ARG)	5.0	8.533		13.533
7	Edward Gonzáles (PER)	5.1	7.800		12.900
8	Santiago Mayol (ARG)	5.5	7.366		12.866

=== Qualification ===
Rank	Gymnast	D Score	E Score	Pen.	Total	Qual.
1	(Canada) Jayson Rampersad	6.100	8.166		14.266	Q
2	(Canada) Zachary Clay	5.700	8.266		13.966	Q
3	(Argentina) Santiago Mayol	5.500	8.366		13.866	Q
4	(Puerto Rico) Nelson Guilbe	5.600	8.266		13.866	Q
5	(United States) Cameron Bock	5.400	8.366		13.766	Q
6	(United States) Stephen Nedoroscik	6.200	7.433		13.633	Q
7	(United States) Vahe Petrosyan	5.300	8.133		13.433	–
8	(Argentina) Luca Alfieri	4.700	8.700		13.400	Q
9	(Peru) Edward Gonzáles	5.400	8.433		7.833	Q
10	(Mexico) Rodrigo Gómez	5.200	7.933		13.133	R1
11	(Brazil) Diogo Soares	5.800	7.100		12.900	R2
12	(Puerto Rico) Andres Josue Perez Ginez	4.700	7.866		12.566	R3
