= Annabelle Kovacs =

Canadian rhythmic gymnast

- Born: 20 April 1996 (age 30) Vancouver, British Columbia, Canada
- Height: 163 cm (5 ft 4 in)

Gymnastics career
- Discipline: Rhythmic gymnastics
- Country represented: Canada
Medal record
Commonwealth Games
Gold medal – first place	2014 Glasgow	Team
Pacific Rim Championships
Silver medal – second place	2014 Richmond	Team

Annabelle Kovacs (born 20 April 1996) is a Canadian retired individual rhythmic gymnast. She won gold in the team event at the 2014 Commonwealth Games.

== Career ==
Kovacs was second at the novice Canadian Championships in 2008, and she was second at the senior championships 2011–2013. She attended a school specifically for high-level athletes and artists and noted that the program helped her continue to train in rhythmic gymnastics, as both the sport and her education were important to her.

In 2013, Kovacs was selected for the World Championships and placed 75th.

In April 2014, she competed with the Canadian team (along with Patricia Bezzoubenko, Maria Kitkarska, and the junior team) at the 2014 Pacific Rim Championships, where they won the team silver medal. Individually, she placed 6th in the all-around. At the Canadian Championships, she won bronze in the all-around as well as in all four of the apparatus finals.

In July, Kovacs was a member of the Canadian team that won a gold medal in the team event (with teammates Bezzoubenko and Kitkarska) at the 2014 Commonwealth Games in Glasgow. She said of the medal, "It was a very proud moment. We’re very excited and felt like we deserved to win because we had worked so hard as a team." Individually, Kovacs placed 13th, with her best apparatus being hoop, where she had the 9th-best score.

The next month, she competed at the Pan American Championships. She competed with two apparatuses, hoop and ribbon. In the hoop final, she placed 5th. In September, she placed 80th at the 2014 World Championships.

== Personal life ==
Kovacs is of Romanian descent. She attended the University of British Columbia, majoring in business communication.
