= Samuel Zakutney =

Canadian artistic gymnast

- Full name: Samuel Adam Zakutney
- Born: 6 October 1998 (age 28) Saint John, New Brunswick, Canada

Gymnastics career
- Discipline: Men's artistic gymnastics
- Country represented: Canada; (2014–present)
- College team: Penn State Nittany Lions (2017–2020)
- Training location: Laval, Quebec, Canada
- Club: Laval Excellence
- Head coach: Adrian Balan
Medal record
Representing Canada
Pan American Games
Bronze medal – third place	2019 Lima	Team
Pacific Rim Championships
Gold medal – first place	2024 Cali	Horizontal bar
Silver medal – second place	2024 Cali	Team
Bronze medal – third place	2024 Cali	Floor exercise

Samuel Adam Zakutney (born October 6, 1998) is a Canadian artistic gymnast. He was a member of the bronze medal-winning team at the 2019 Pan American Games. Individually, he is the 2024 Pacific Rim champion on horizontal bar. He represented Canada at the 2024 Summer Olympics.

== Personal life ==
Zakutney was born to Timothy and Lise Zakutney in 1998. He has two sisters and graduated from Pennsylvania State University in 2020 with a degree in biomedical engineering.

== Gymnastics career ==
=== 2018–2019 ===
Zakutney competed at the 2018 Pan American Championships where he helped Canada finish fifth as a team. He competed at the 2018 World Championships where he helped Canada finish eighteenth during qualifications.

Zakutney competed at the 2019 Pan American Games where he helped Canada win bronze. Individually he finished fourth on horizontal bar. He competed at the 2018 World Championships where he helped Canada finish seventeenth during qualifications.

=== 2021–2022 ===
Zakutney tore his ACL in August 2021.

Zakutney returned to competition in late 2022, competing at the Paris World Challenge Cup. He competed at the 2022 World Championships where he helped Canada finish tenth during qualifications.

=== 2024 ===
Zakutney competed at the DTB Pokal Team Challenge and Pacific Rim Championships, helping Canada win silver at the latter. Individually he won gold on horizontal bar and bronze on floor exercise at the Pacific Rim Championships. In late June, Zakutney was named to the team to represent Canada at the 2024 Summer Olympics alongside Zachary Clay, René Cournoyer, Félix Dolci, and William Émard. While there he helped Canada finish eighth as a team.

=== 2026 ===
Zakutney was selected to represent Canada at the 2026 World Championships alongside Jordan Carroll, René Cournoyer, Félix Dolci, and Xavier Olasz. He qualified to the all-around final where he finished nineteenth.

== Competitive history ==
Competitive history of Samuel Zakutney
Year	Event	Team	AA	FX	PH	SR	VT	PB	HB
2014
2014	Junior Pan American Championships	3rd place, bronze medalist(s)							
2016	Olympic Test Event	8	54						
2017	Universiade	8							
2018	Elite Canada		4	4					7
2018	Canadian Championships		4	7			2nd place, silver medalist(s)	6	6
2018	Mersin World Challenge Cup							5	2nd place, silver medalist(s)
2018	Pan American Championships	5							
2018	World Championships	18							
2019	Canadian Championships		1st place, gold medalist(s)	2nd place, silver medalist(s)	4		1st place, gold medalist(s)	1st place, gold medalist(s)	1st place, gold medalist(s)
2019	Elite Canada		5						
2019	Pan American Games	3rd place, bronze medalist(s)							4
2019	World Championships	17							
2021	Elite Canada		2nd place, silver medalist(s)		3rd place, bronze medalist(s)	3rd place, bronze medalist(s)	2nd place, silver medalist(s)	3rd place, bronze medalist(s)	1st place, gold medalist(s)
2022
2022	World Championships	10							
2023	Elite Canada							1st place, gold medalist(s)	1st place, gold medalist(s)
2023	DTB Pokal Team Challenge	8							
2024	Elite Canada			2nd place, silver medalist(s)					3rd place, bronze medalist(s)
2024	DTB Pokal Team Challenge	11							
2024	Pacific Rim Championships	2nd place, silver medalist(s)	4	3rd place, bronze medalist(s)				4	1st place, gold medalist(s)
2024	Canadian Championships		4					2nd place, silver medalist(s)	3rd place, bronze medalist(s)
2024	RomGym Trophy			3rd place, bronze medalist(s)					2nd place, silver medalist(s)
2024	Olympic Games	8							
2025	Paris World Challenge Cup							4	
2025	World Championships							60	49
2026	Canadian Championships		3rd place, bronze medalist(s)		3rd place, bronze medalist(s)			3rd place, bronze medalist(s)	5
2026	World Championships	13	19						

== See also ==
- List of Pennsylvania State University Olympians
