= Alexandra Merkulova =

Russian rhythmic gymnast

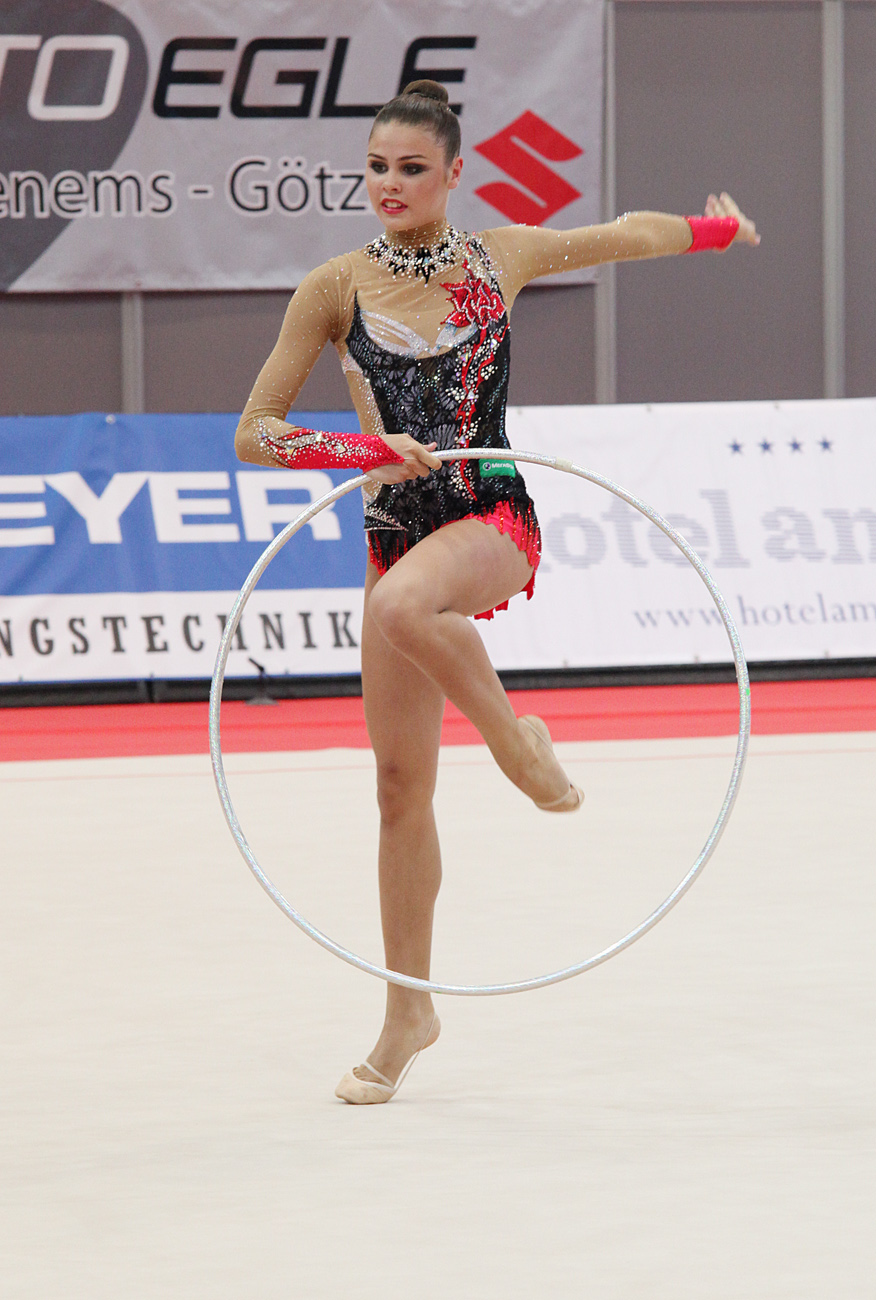
- Merkulova at the 2012 Grand Prix Vorarlberg

Personal information
- Full name: Alexandra Sergeyevna Merkulova
- Nicknames: Sasha, Merku
- Born: 25 November 1995 (age 30) Kemerovo, Russia
- Height: 173 cm (5 ft 8 in)

Gymnastics career
- Discipline: Rhythmic gymnastics
- Country represented: Russia
- Club: Gazprom
- Gym: Novogorsk
- Head coach: Irina Viner
- Choreographer: Veronika Shatkova
- Retired: 2015
- World ranking: 13 (2013 Season); 7 (2012 Season); 8 (2011 Season)
Medal record
Rhythmic Gymnastics
Representing Russia
World Championships
Gold medal – first place	2011 Montpellier	Team
European Championships
Silver medal – second place	2012 Nizhny Novgorod	All-around
Junior European Championships
Gold medal – first place	2010 Bremen	Team
Gold medal – first place	2010 Bremen	Rope
Gold medal – first place	2010 Bremen	Ball
Summer Universiade
Gold medal – first place	2013 Kazan	Ball
Silver medal – second place	2013 Kazan	All-around
Silver medal – second place	2013 Kazan	Ribbon
Youth Olympic Games
Gold medal – first place	2010 Singapore	All-around

Alexandra Sergeyevna Merkulova (Russian: Алекса́ндра Серге́евна Мерку́лова; born 25 November 1995) is a retired Russian individual rhythmic gymnast. She is the 2010 Youth Olympic Games champion and the 2012 European all-around silver medalist.

== Personal life ==
Merkulova is the middle child of five children. She has two older sisters, Olya and Natasha, and two younger brothers, Savva and Vasya. She is married to Igor Ozhiganov, an ice hockey player for SKA Saint Petersburg in the Kontinental Hockey League, and they have a son together.

== Career ==
Merkulova began rhythmic gymnastics because her mother wanted her to be a dancer, and her father wanted her to do sports—rhythmic gymnastics was the compromise. She is often compared to Alina Kabaeva in looks and in style.

Merkulova's junior international debut came in 2008. After winning all-around gold at the 2008 Junior Grand Prix Final in Bratislava and in the 2010 Junior Grand Prix in Innsbruck, she won the all-around gold at the 2009 Pesaro Junior World Cup, the 2010 Saint Petersburg Junior World Cup and won 3 gold medals in team, rope and ball at the 2010 European Junior Championships. Merkulova then won gold at the inaugural Youth Olympic Games held in Singapore.

In 2011, Merkulova struggled with new routines in her first year as a senior, but eventually went to the Montpellier World Championships to compete in clubs. She won the silver medal in all-around at the last stage of the 2011 World Cup series behind teammate Daria Dmitrieva. In the event finals she won gold in clubs and three silver medals in hoop, ball and ribbon. She was absent from Russian nationals in November due to an injury.

In 2012, Merkulova won the Tashkent World Cup All-around title and the individual apparatus finals in ball, hoop and clubs. Competing with teammate Evgenia Kanaeva at the 2012 European Championships, in place of Daria Kondakova and Daria Dmitrieva who were both injured, she took the all-around silver medal. At the Grand Prix Vorarlberg in Austria in July 2012, Merkulova won the bronze medal in all-around behind Kanaeva and Dmitrieva as well as silver in the hoop finals. At the World Cup series in Minsk, she finished fourth in the all-around behind Liubov Charkashyna and won silver in the clubs final. She was named as Russia's nominal second entry for the individual all-around at the 2012 Summer Olympics in London, alongside Kanaeva, however, Dmitrieva replaced her in Russia's final entries on August 2, 2012, due to Merkulova's foot injury.

In 2013, Merkulova returned to competition after one month of training since recovering from her injury. At the Moscow Grand Prix, she finished fourth in all-around and won a silver medal in ball final. At the next Grand Prix in Holon, she placed fifth in All-around and won gold in ball final. She won bronze in All-around at the Thiais Grand Prix and silver medals in ball and clubs final. At the second World Cup series of the season, held in Lisbon, Portugal, Merkulova won silver in All-around but withdrew from the hoop event because of a sprained ankle. She also withdrew from the 2013 Sofia World Cup and was replaced by Yana Kudryavtseva. She returned to competition at the 2013 Corbeil-Essonnes World Cup, placing fourth in All-around and winning bronze medals in the hoop and ribbon finals. Merkulova was initially listed in the Russian team for the 2013 European Championships in Vienna, Austria but was later replaced by Kudryavtseva. After recovering from injury, Merkulova returned to international competition at the International Trophy "Ciutat de Barcelona" and won gold in All-around ahead of Ukrainian Alina Maksymenko. At the 2013 Summer Universiade, she won the silver in All-around behind teammate Margarita Mamun, as well as gold in ball and silver in ribbon. She placed 5th in hoop and 7th in clubs. Merkulova was seventh at the 2013 Grand Prix Brno and withdrew from the Grand Prix Final in Berlin. Viner said she had re-injured her leg from weight gain.

In April 2014, Merkulova returned to competition at the 2014 Russian Championships where she finished 8th in the all-around. In February 2015, Merkulova announced the end of her competitive sport career as a gymnast at the 2015 Grand Prix Moscow gala.

== Routine music information ==
Year	Apparatus	Music title
2013	Hoop	Flamenco by Pepe Romero
2013	Ball	Heart of Courage by Two Steps from Hell
2013	Clubs	Let's Get Loud by Jennifer Lopez
2013	Ribbon (fourth)	Peter Gunn theme music from The Blues Brothers OST by Henri Mancini
2013	Ribbon (third)	Pretty Woman
2013	Ribbon (second)	Stivali E Colbacco by Adriano Celentano
2013	Ribbon (first)	Apache in Marrakech by Feel Good Productions
2012	Hoop	Senorita by Bond
2012	Ball (second)	Farrucas by Pepe Romero
2012	Ball (first)	Havana by Kenny G
2012	Clubs	Peter Gunn theme music from The Blues Brothers OST by Henri Mancini
2012	Ribbon	Dance of the Soviet Sailors from The Red Poppy by Reinhold Gliere
2011	Hoop	Samba de Janeiro by Bellini
2011	Ball	Stormy tango by Agrios Kairos
2011	Clubs	Be Italian music from Nine OST by Maury Yeston
2011	Ribbon	Espana cani by Cincinnati Pops Orchestra
2010	Hoop	God is Gipsy from Foua by Municipale Balcanica
2010	Ball	Hernando's Hideaway by Enoch Light
2010	Rope	Soul Sacrifice by Carlos Santana
2010	Clubs	The Charleston by Spike Jones & His City Slickers
