= Patricia Bezzoubenko =

Canadian rhythmic gymnast

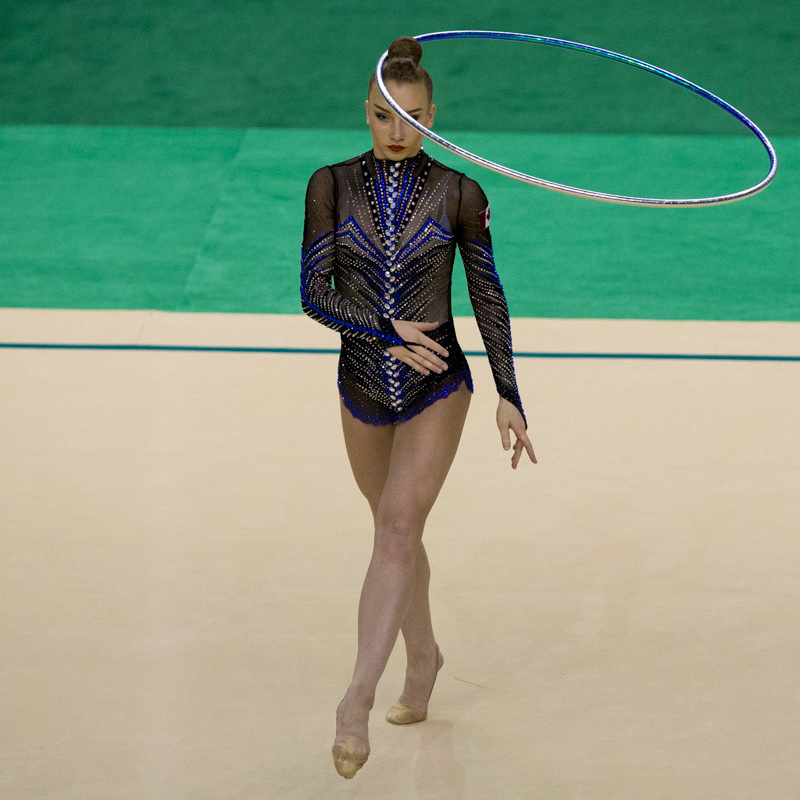
- Bezzoubenko performing with the hoop at the 2016 Gymnastics Olympic Test Event

Personal information
- Full name: Patricia Bezzoubenko
- Born: 21 February 1997 (age 29) North Vancouver, British Columbia, Canada
- Height: 170 cm (5 ft 7 in)

Gymnastics career
- Discipline: Rhythmic gymnastics
- Country represented: Canada
- Head coach: Svetlana Joukova
- Choreographer: Julia Golubenko
- Retired: 2017
Medal record
Representing Canada
Rhythmic Gymnastics
Pan American Games
Silver medal – second place	2015 Toronto	Clubs
Bronze medal – third place	2015 Toronto	All-around
Commonwealth Games
Gold medal – first place	2014 Glasgow	All-around
Gold medal – first place	2014 Glasgow	Hoop
Gold medal – first place	2014 Glasgow	Ball
Gold medal – first place	2014 Glasgow	Clubs
Gold medal – first place	2014 Glasgow	Team
Bronze medal – third place	2014 Glasgow	Ribbon
Pacific Rim Championships
Gold medal – first place	2014 Richmond	All-around
Gold medal – first place	2014 Richmond	Hoop
Gold medal – first place	2014 Richmond	Clubs
Gold medal – first place	2014 Richmond	Ribbon
Silver medal – second place	2014 Richmond	Team
Bronze medal – third place	2014 Richmond	Ball
Pan American Championships
Gold medal – first place	2014 Mississauga	Hoop
Gold medal – first place	2014 Mississauga	Ball
Silver medal – second place	2014 Mississauga	Clubs

Patricia Bezzoubenko (born 21 February 1997) is a Canadian individual rhythmic gymnast. She is a four-time Canadian Senior National champion, five-time Commonwealth Games Champion, Pan-American games medalist. She holds dual citizenship with Canada and Russia. She was training in Novogorsk with the highest level coaches and gymnasts. Now Patricia is coaching and providing master classes all around the world.

== Personal life ==
Bezzoubenko was born in North Vancouver, British Columbia, but moved to Russia at the age of four with her parents and began training in Moscow. When her coaches learned she possessed dual citizenship with Canada, they arranged for her to work with Canadian coach Svetlana Joukova in Toronto. Bezzoubenko spends about half of the year training in Moscow as well as several months in Canada.

== Career ==
Bezzoubenko appeared in international junior competitions in 2010. She won bronze medal in ball at the 2012 Pesaro Junior World Cup. At the Junior Pacific Rim Championships in Everett, Washington, Bezzoubenko won the all-around gold, at the event finals: she won two golds (clubs and hoop), a silver in ribbon, and bronze in ball. She then won the all-around gold at the Junior Pan American Championships in Cordoba, Argentina.

Bezzoubenko debuted as a Senior in the 2013 Season, she competed in the Grand Prix and World Cup Rhythmic Gymnastics Series. Bezzoubenko missed qualifying for the all-around finals at the 2013 World Championships in Kyiv, Ukraine finishing 25th in the qualifications behind American Rebecca Sereda who qualified for the last spot.

In 2014, Bezzoubenko started her season competing at the 2014 Grand Prix Moscow, she then competed at the 2014 Grand Prix Thiais, She repeated as Canadian National champion. Bezzoubenko won four gold medals at the 2014 Pacific Rim Championships including the all-around title of the event. On May 9–11, Bezzoubenko competed at the 2014 Corbeil-Essonnes World Cup and finished 13th in all-around. Bezzoubenko won the all-around at the 2014 Commonwealth Games in Glasgow, Scotland with a total score of 59.175 points and Team event (with teammates Maria Kitkarska and Annabelle Kovacs). In event finals, she won three gold (ball, hoop, clubs) and bronze in ribbon. Bezzoubenko then competed at the 2014 Sofia World Cup finishing 26th in all-around finals. On September 5–7, at the 2014 World World Cup Final in Kazan, Russia, Bezzoubenko finished 17th in all-around behind Salome Phajava. On September 22–28, at the 2014 World Championships, Bezzoubenko was able to qualify to the all-around finals where she finished in last place in 24th position.

In 2015, Bezzoubenko began the season competing at the 2015 Moscow Grand Prix finishing 16th in the all-around, she qualified to 1 event final in ball. On March 21–22, Bezzoubenko competed at the 2015 Thiais Grand Prix finishing 10th in the all-around behind Veronika Polyakova. In 2015, Bezzoubenko competed at the 2015 Bucharest World Cup and finished 18th in the all-around. On April 10–12, Bezzoubenko finished 27th in the all-around at the 2015 Pesaro World Cup. Bezzoubenko finished 13th in all-around at the 2015 Berlin Grand Prix with a total of 68.100 points. At the 2015 Pan American Games, Bezzoubenko won the all-around bronze medal behind American Jasmine Kerber, she qualified to 3 event finals taking silver in clubs. In August, Bezzoubenko finished 25th in the all-around at the 2015 Budapest World Cup. At the 2015 World Cup Final in Kazan, Bezzoubenko finished 21st in the all-around. On September 9–13, Bezzoubenko competed at the 2015 World Championships in Stuttgart, She finished 31st in the All-around qualifications and did not advance into the Top 24 finals. On October 2–4, Bezzoubenko competed at the 2015 Aeon Cup in Tokyo Japan, finishing 12th in the all-around finals behind Japan's Kaho Minagawa.

In 2016, Bezzoubenko started her season competing at the 2016 Grand Prix Moscow finishing 21st in the all-around with a total of 66.916 points. On February 26–28, she competed at the 2016 Espoo World Cup finishing 23rd in the all-around. On March 17–20, Bezzoubenko then competed at the 2016 Lisboa World Cup where she finished 14th in the all-around. At the 30th Thiais Grand Prix event in Paris, she finished 22nd in the all-around. On April 1–3, she competed at the 2016 Pesaro World Cup where she finished 23rd in the all-around. On April 21–22, Bezzoubenko competed at the 2016 Gymnastics Olympic Test Event held in Rio de Janeiro however she finished a disappointing 13th and did not qualify in top 8 highest score for non qualified gymnasts. Bezzoubenko then finished 17th in the all-around at the 2016 Sofia World Cup. On June 3–5, Bezzoubenko finished 15th in the all-around at the 2016 Guadalajara World Cup with a total of 68.700 points. On July 1–3, Bezzoubenko competed at the 2016 Berlin World Cup finishing 15th in the all-around. On July 8–10, Bezzoubenko then finished 26th in the all-around at the 2016 Kazan World Cup. On July 22–24, culminating the World Cup of the season in 2016 Baku World Cup, Bezzoubenko finished 12th in the all-around scoring a New Personal Best total of 70.100 points behind America's Laura Zeng.

In 2017 Patricia Bezzoubenko retired from competitive Rhythmic Gymnastics, and began coaching at Excellence RG in Toronto.

== Routine music information ==
Year	Apparatus	Music title
2016	Hoop	????
2016	Ball	I Put a Spell on You music from Fifty Shades of Grey by Annie Lennox
2016	Clubs	Misirlou by David Garrett, Rise by Safri Duo
2016	Ribbon	Mas que Nada by Chilled Jazz Masters
2015	Hoop	William Tell Overture by Gioachino Rossini
2015	Ball	Kalinka (Russian folk) by Ivan Larionov
2015	Clubs	Misirlou by David Garrett, Rise by Safri Duo
2015	Ribbon	The Show Must Go On by Queen
2014	Hoop	Pasodoble by Pasqual Narro
2014	Ball	Kalinka (Russian folk) by Ivan Larionov
2014	Clubs	Misirlou by David Garrett, Rise by Safri Duo
2014	Ribbon	The Show Must Go On by Queen
2013	Hoop	More Cannons! music from Kung Fu Panda 2: OST by Hans Zimmer, John Powell
2013	Ball	Tango 2000 (Kut and Swel Tribal Remix) by Degg & Blakker
2013	Clubs	Batucada (Latino Percussion Mix)" by DJ Dero
2013	Ribbon	Skyfall music from Skyfall by Adele
