= Zachary Clay =

Canadian artistic gymnast

- Full name: Zachary Nathaniel Clay
- Born: July 5, 1995 (age 31) Langley, British Columbia, Canada

Gymnastics career
- Discipline: Men's artistic gymnastics
- Country represented: Canada; (2011–2025)
- Club: Twisters Gymnastics Club
- Head coach: Richard Ikeda
- Retired: July 4, 2025
Medal record
Representing Canada
Commonwealth Games
Silver medal – second place	2018 Gold Coast	Team
Bronze medal – third place	2014 Glasgow	Team
Bronze medal – third place	2018 Gold Coast	Pommel horse
Pan American Games
Gold medal – first place	2023 Santiago	Pommel horse
Silver medal – second place	2023 Santiago	Team
Bronze medal – third place	2019 Lima	Team
Pan American Championships
Gold medal – first place	2017 Lima	Pommel horse
Silver medal – second place	2023 Medellín	Team
Pacific Rim Championships
Silver medal – second place	2024 Cali	Team
Silver medal – second place	2024 Cali	Pommel horse

Zachary Nathaniel Clay (born July 5, 1995) is a Canadian former artistic gymnast. He is the 2017 Pan American and 2023 Pan American Games champion on pommel horse. He represented Canada at the 2024 Olympic Games.

== Gymnastics career ==
=== 2014–15 ===
Clay helped Canada win the bronze medal in the team final at the 2014 Commonwealth Games held in Glasgow, Scotland.

In 2015, Clay tore his ACL and fractured his tibia during a competition.

=== 2017–19 ===
Clay competed at the 2017 Pan American Championships. He won gold on pommel horse, earning his first major international title. He later competed at the World Championships where he placed 21st in the all-around.

At the 2018 Commonwealth Games, Clay helped Canada finish second as a team. Individually he won the bronze medal on pommel horse behind Rhys McClenaghan and Max Whitlock. In September Clay competed at the 2018 Pan American Championships where he helped Canada finish fifth as a team. The following month, he competed at the World Championships where he helped Canada finish 18th during qualifications.

Clay represented Canada at the 2019 Pan American Games held in Lima, Peru. He helped Canada win the bronze medal in the team final. Individually, he placed sixth during the pommel horse final.

=== 2022 ===
Clay competed at the DTB Pokal Team Challenge and Mixed Cup in Stuttgart. During the team challenge, he helped Canada finish fifth as a team. At the 2022 World Championships, Clay helped the Canadian team finish tenth during qualifications. He did not qualify for any individual finals.

=== 2023 ===
Clay competed at the 2023 Pan American Championships where he helped Canada win the silver medal.

In October, Clay competed at the 2023 World Championships alongside René Cournoyer, Félix Dolci, William Emard, and Jayson Rampersad. During qualifications he helped Canada finish fourth, which qualified Canada a team berth to the 2024 Olympic Games, a feat last achieved by the Canadian men's gymnastics team in 2008. During the team final Clay contributed a score on pommel horse towards Canada's seventh-place finish.

Clay next competed at the Pan American Games. On the first day of competition he helped the Canadian team win the silver medal behind the United States. Individually he qualified to the pommel horse final. On the first day of event finals Clay won gold on pommel horse ahead of compatriot Rampersad. In doing so, Clay became the first Canadian to win gold on pommel horse at the Pan American Games.

=== 2024 ===
In late June Clay was named to the team to represent Canada at the 2024 Summer Olympics alongside René Cournoyer, Félix Dolci, William Émard, and Samuel Zakutney. While there he helped Canada finish eighth as a team.

== Competitive history ==
Competitive history of Zachary Clay
Year	Event	Team	AA	FX	PH	SR	VT	PB	HB
2011	Commonwealth Youth Games	2nd place, silver medalist(s)	7	4	4		5	6	
2014	Elite Canada							1st place, gold medalist(s)	
2014	Canadian Championships				1st place, gold medalist(s)			2nd place, silver medalist(s)	
2014	Commonwealth Games	3rd place, bronze medalist(s)						8	
2014	World Championships	14							
2015	Elite Canada				1st place, gold medalist(s)			4	
2015	World Championships	15							
2017	Canadian Championships		1st place, gold medalist(s)		2nd place, silver medalist(s)	2nd place, silver medalist(s)	1st place, gold medalist(s)	4	3rd place, bronze medalist(s)
2017	Pan American Championships				1st place, gold medalist(s)	6		6	
2017	World Championships		21						
2018	Elite Canada		5		8				
2018	UCIC Calgary		3rd place, bronze medalist(s)		1st place, gold medalist(s)	3rd place, bronze medalist(s)			
2018	Commonwealth Games	2nd place, silver medalist(s)			3rd place, bronze medalist(s)				
2018	Canadian Championships		5		2nd place, silver medalist(s)	8			8
2018	Guimarães Challenge Cup				5				
2018	Pan American Championships	5	7						
2018	World Championships	18							
2018	Toyota International				4	6			
2019	Elite Canada		3rd place, bronze medalist(s)	7	2nd place, silver medalist(s)	6		5	
2019	UCIC Calgary		7		4			4	5
2019	Canadian Championships		4		1st place, gold medalist(s)	6		3rd place, bronze medalist(s)	
2019	Pan American Games	3rd place, bronze medalist(s)			6				
2021	Koper Challenge Cup				4				
2021	World Championships				19			44	
2022	DTB Pokal Team Challenge	5						6	
2022	DTB Pokal Mixed Cup	4							
2022	Paris Challenge Cup				4				
2022	World Championships	10							
2023	Elite Canada				2nd place, silver medalist(s)				
2023	Pan American Championships	2nd place, silver medalist(s)							
2023	RomGym Trophy	2nd place, silver medalist(s)			2nd place, silver medalist(s)				
2023	World Championships	7							
2023	Pan American Games	2nd place, silver medalist(s)			1st place, gold medalist(s)			5	
2024	Elite Canada		5	6	11	9	9	7	2nd place, silver medalist(s)
2024	DTB Pokal Team Challenge	11							
2024	Pacific Rim Championships	2nd place, silver medalist(s)			2nd place, silver medalist(s)				
2024	Canadian Championships		7	11	2nd place, silver medalist(s)	7		14	7
2024	RomGym Trophy				4				
2024	Olympic Games	8							
