= 2014 Pacific Rim Gymnastics Championships =

International gymnastics competition

- Location: Richmond, British Columbia
- Dates: April 9–12, 2014

The 2014 Pacific Rim Championships were held from 9 April to 12 April 2014 in Richmond, British Columbia.

== Overall medal table ==
Rank	Nation	Gold	Silver	Bronze	Total
1	United States	21	21	11	53
2	China	12	11	11	34
3	Canada	10	5	10	25
4	Japan	7	4	7	18
5	Australia	2	1	4	7
6	Colombia	1	1	2	4
7	Chinese Taipei	1	0	0	1
8	New Zealand	0	1	0	1
9	Hong Kong	0	0	1	1
9	Singapore	0	0	1	1
Totals (10 entries)		54	44	47	145

== Medalists ==
=== Artistic gymnastics ===
==== Men's events ====
Event	Gold	Silver	Bronze
Team	United States; Chris Brooks; Alexander Naddour; John Orozco; Davis Grooms; Marty Strech; Alec Yoder	Japan; Shohei Fuiwara; Toshiya Ikejiri; Yuto Murakami; Kakeru Tanigawa; Kentaro Yunoki; Kenya Yuasa	Canada; Kevin Lytwyn; Scott Morgan; Hugh Smith; René Cournoyer; Aaron Mah; Ryan Oehrlein
Seniors
All-Around	(United States) John Orozco	(Japan) Toshiya Ikejiri	(Japan) Yuto Murakami
Floor	(Canada) Scott Morgan	(United States) John Orozco	(Japan) Toshiya Ikejiri
Pommel Horse	(China) Yang Shengchao	(China) Cai Weifeng	(Colombia) Jorge Hugo Giraldo
Rings	(Chinese Taipei) Chen Chih-yu	(United States) John Orozco	(Canada) Scott Morgan
Vault	(Colombia) Jossimar Calvo (Canada) Hugh Smith	None awarded	(Hong Kong) Wai Hung Shek
Parallel Bars	(United States) John Orozco	(China) Lu Wentian	(Colombia) Jossimar Calvo
Horizontal Bar	(United States) John Orozco	(Colombia) Jossimar Calvo (China) Yang Shengchao	None awarded
Juniors
All-Around	(Japan) Kakeru Tanigawa	(United States) Marty Strech (United States) Alec Yoder	None awarded
Floor	(Japan) Kakeru Tanigawa (China) Huang Minggi	None awarded	(United States) Marty Strech
Pommel Horse	(United States) Alec Yoder	(United States) Davis Grooms	(Japan) Kakeru Tanigawa
Rings	(Canada) Ryan Oehrlein	(China) Zou Jingyuan	(United States) Alec Yoder
Vault	(Australia) Clay Stephens	(United States) Marty Strech	(Japan) Kenya Yuasa
Parallel Bars	(Japan) Kakeru Tanigawa	(China) Huang Minggi	(United States) Davis Grooms (China) Zou Jingyuan
Horizontal Bar	(Japan) Kakeru Tanigawa (Japan) Kenya Yuasa	None awarded	(China) Huang Minggi

==== Women's events ====
Event	Gold	Silver	Bronze
Team	United States; Elizabeth Price; Peyton Ernst; Kyla Ross; Bailie Key; Norah Flatley; Nia Dennis	Canada; Ellie Black; Aleeza Yu; Maegan Chant; Megan Roberts; Rose-Kaying Woo; Shallon Olsen	China; Xie Yufen; Liu Tingting; Liu Ying; Zhou Linlin; Luo Huan
Seniors
All-Around	(United States) Elizabeth Price	(United States) Kyla Ross	(Canada) Ellie Black
Vault	(Canada) Ellie Black	(New Zealand) Courtney McGregor	(Canada) Maegan Chant
Uneven Bars	(United States) Elizabeth Price	(United States) Kyla Ross	(Australia) Georgia-Rose Brown
Balance Beam	(United States) Kyla Ross	(China) Xie Yufen	(United States) Elizabeth Price
Floor	(United States) Elizabeth Price	(United States) Kyla Ross	(Canada) Aleeza Yu
Juniors
All-Around	(United States) Bailie Key	(United States) Nia Dennis	(China) Luo Huan
Vault	(United States) Bailie Key	(United States) Nia Dennis	(Canada) Shallon Olsen
Uneven Bars	(China) Luo Huan	(United States) Bailie Key	(China) Liu Tingting
Balance Beam	(United States) Norah Flatley	(United States) Bailie Key	(China) Zhou Linlin
Floor	(United States) Bailie Key	(Canada) Shallon Olsen	(Canada) Rose-Kaying Woo

=== Rhythmic gymnastics ===
Event	Gold	Silver	Bronze
Team	United States; Nastasya Generalova; Ekatherina Kapitonova; Brigita Budginas; Aliya Protto; Cindy Lu; Valeriya Sharipova	Canada; Katherine Uchida; Cindy Huh; Dana Tors; Annabelle Kovacs; Maria Kitkarska; Patricia Bezzoubenko	China; Wang Ruoqi; Wang Yujia; Zhao Yating; Xu Xiaolan; Ma Qianhui; Wang Yili
Seniors
All-Around	Canada; Patricia Bezzoubenko	United States; Aliya Protto	United States; Cindy Lu
Hoop	United States; Aliya Protto; Canada; Patricia Bezzoubenko	None Awarded	United States; Valeriya Sharipova
Ball	United States; Cindy Lu	United States; Aliya Protto	Canada; Patricia Bezzoubenko
Clubs	Canada; Patricia Bezzoubenko	United States; Cindy Lu	United States; Aliya Protto
Ribbon	Canada; Patricia Bezzoubenko	United States; Cindy Lu	United States; Aliya Protto
Juniors
All-Around	China; Zhao Yating	United States; Nastasya Generalova	United States; Ekatherina Kapitonova
Hoop	United States; Ekatherina Kapitonova; China; Zhao Yating	None Awarded	United States; Brigita Budginas
Ball	United States; Ekatherina Kapitonova; China; Zhao Yating	None Awarded	United States; Nastasya Generalova
Clubs	United States; Nastasya Generalova	United States; Brigita Budginas	China; Zhao Yating
Ribbon	United States; Ekatherina Kapitonova	United States; Nastasya Generalova	China; Zhao Yating
Group	China; Hu Yuhui; Li Ziyi; Liu Xin; Jin Kebing; Shi Jiayi; Siyuan You	United States; Yelyzaveta Merenzon; Elina Nikerina; Sophia Popova; Emily Rakhnyansky; Nicole Sladkov; Nicky Wojtana	Singapore; Jael Chew; Edlyn Zen Uee Ho; Noelle Goh; Alison Tan; Siew Lyn Yeo; Wan Xuan

1. ^ Medals were also awarded for each round, 5 Hoops (Gold: China, Silver: Singapore, Bronze: United States) and 5 Clubs (Gold: China, Silver: United States, Bronze: Canada)

=== Trampoline ===
Event	Gold	Silver	Bronze
Men's Team	China; Hu Zichao; Lian Shidong; Liu Changxin; Zhang Zhenquian	Canada; Ben Blais; Jason Burnett; Keevin Madigan; Keegan Soehn	Australia; Dominic Clarke; Blake Gaudrey; Hugh McConnell; Shaun Swadling
Women's Team	China; Diao Ruiwei; Jia Yujie; Liu Lingling; Zhu Xueying	Canada; Frederike Breault; Rosie MacLennan; Samantha Sendel; Kieran Wheatley	Japan; Ayano Kishi; Hikaru Mori; Yuri Murayama; Yuna Sato
Seniors
Men's Individual	Japan; Yasuhiro Ueyama	China; Zhang Zenqian	China; Hu Zichao
Men's Synchro	Japan; Masaki Ito; Yasuhiro Ueyama	China; Hu Zichao; Zhang Zenqian	Australia; Blake Gaudrey; Shaun Swadling
Women's Individual	Canada; Rosie MacLennan	China; Liu Lingling	Japan; Ayano Kishi
Women's Synchro	Canada; Rosie MacLennan; Samantha Sendel	Japan; Ayano Kishi; Yuna Sato	China; Diao Ruiwei; Liu Lingling
Juniors
Men's Individual	China; Liang Shidong	China; Liu Changxin	Australia; Dominic Clarke
Men's Synchro	China; Liang Shidong; Liu Changxin	Australia; Dominic Clarke; Hugh McConnell	Canada; Ben Blais; Keevin Madigan
Women's Individual	China; Zhu Xueying	China; Jia Yujie	Japan; Hikaru Mori
Women's Synchro	Australia; Jayden Cooney; Abbie Watts	Japan; Hikaru Mori; Yuri Murayama	Canada; Frederike Breault; Kieran Wheatley
