= Marty Strech =

American artistic gymnast

- Full name: Martin James Strech
- Nicknames: Marty, Mart
- Born: April 18, 1997 (age 29) Fountain Valley, California, United States
- Height: 5 ft 8 in (1.72 m)

Gymnastics career
- Discipline: Men's artistic gymnastics
- Country represented: United States (2007-)
- College team: University of Michigan
- Gym: Azarian U.S. Gymnastics Center
- Head coach: Eduard Azarian
Medal record
Men's artistic gymnastics
Representing the United States
Pacific Rim Championships
Gold medal – first place	2014 Richmond	Team

Martin "Marty" James Strech (born April 18, 1997 in Fountain Valley, California) is an American artistic gymnast. He was part of the U.S. team at the 2014 Pacific Rim Championships where he picked up team gold and silver and bronze medals for Vault and Floor events.

== Competitive History ==
=== 2012 ===
Strech competed at the 2012 VISA Championships in St Louis, Mo where he picked 2 silvers on Floor and Pommel Horse as well as an All-around bronze.

=== 2013 ===
Marty placed 40th overall at the Winter Cup Challenge in Las Vegas, NV, with a combined field of junior and senior athletes. Strech took home an all-around silver at the 2013 P&G U.S. National Championships at the XL Center in Hartford, Connecticut.

=== 2014 ===
Strech finished 36th at the Winter Cup Challenge in 2014. Marty was later selected to represent Team USA at the Junior Pan American Championships in Aracaju, Brazil. He took all-around gold as well as team gold. He later was chosen to compete at the Pacific Rim Championships in Richmond, Canada. He helped the team win a gold medal and he also shared a silver in the all-around with compatriot, Alec Yoder. He later won a silver on vault and a bronze on floor.

== Personal life ==
Strech attended University of Michigan following high school graduation.
