= Isha Sánchez Hernández =

Olympic athlete

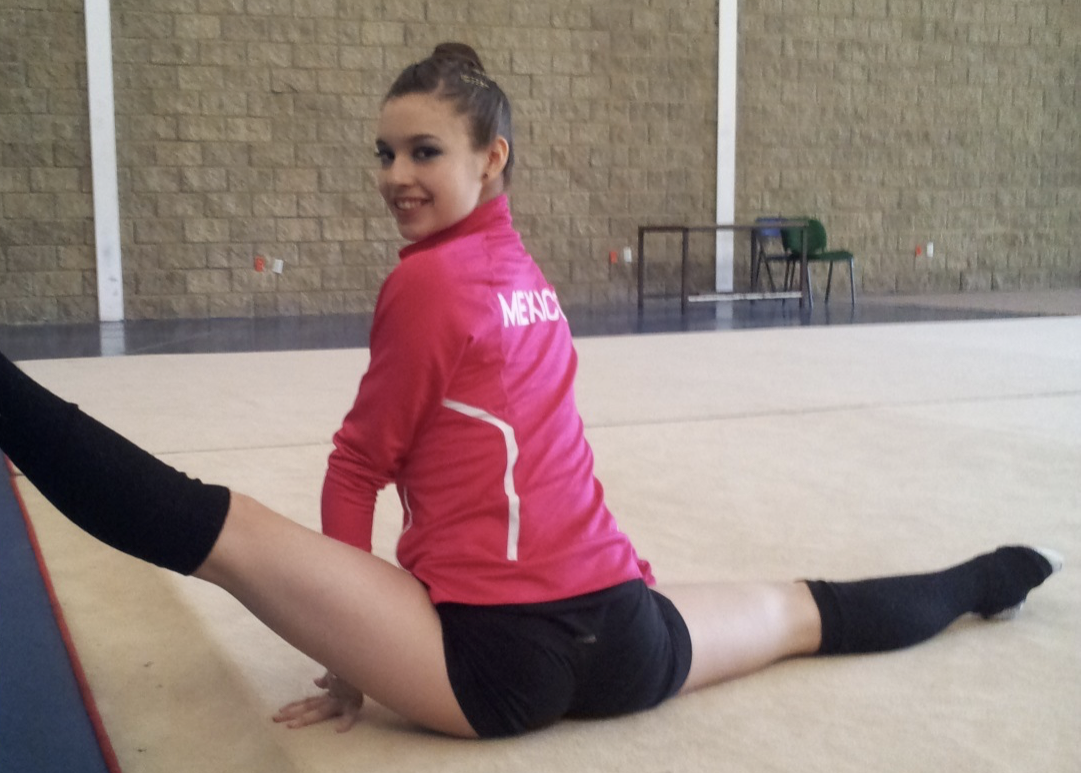

Personal information
- Full name: Isha Elienai Sánchez Hernández
- Born: 27 October 1995 (age 29); Monterrey, Mexico

Gymnastics career
- Discipline: Rhythmic gymnastics
- Country represented: Mexico
- Retired: 2012

Isha Sánchez Hernández (born 27 October 1995) is a Mexican former rhythmic gymnast. She was the first Mexican rhythmic gymnast to compete at an Olympic event when she competed at the 2010 Summer Youth Olympics.

Sánchez was born in Monterrey on 27 October 1995. She began learning gymnastics at age 2 and won medals at the national level. She won a bronze medal in the ball final as well as the team event at the 2009 Junior Pan American Championships. The next year, she competed in the 2010 Singapore Youth Olympic Games. There, she came in 17th in the qualification round. She retired in 2012 due to a mixture of wanting to pursue an education in medicine, poor coaching that she alleged was psychologically abusive, and injuries, and went on to study at Universidad Anáhuac Cancún.
