= Jayson Rampersad =

Canadian artistic gymnast

- Born: 31 July 2003 (age 23) Mississauga, Ontario, Canada
- Height: 167 cm (5 ft 6 in)

Gymnastics career
- Discipline: Men's artistic gymnastics
- Country represented: Canada; (2018–present)
- Club: Laval Excellence
- Head coach: Adrian Balan
- Former coach: Ferenc Szabo
Medal record
Representing Canada
Commonwealth Games
Silver medal – second place	2022 Birmingham	Team
Bronze medal – third place	2022 Birmingham	Pommel horse
Pan American Games
Silver medal – second place	2023 Santiago	Team
Silver medal – second place	2023 Santiago	Pommel horse
Pan American Championships
Silver medal – second place	2022 Rio de Janeiro	Pommel horse
Bronze medal – third place	2022 Rio de Janeiro	Team
World University Games
Silver medal – second place	2025 Rhine-Ruhr	Team
Pacific Rim Championships
Gold medal – first place	2024 Cali	Pommel horse
Silver medal – second place	2024 Cali	Team

Jayson Rampersad (born July 31, 2003) is a Canadian artistic gymnast. He is a pommel horse specialist. He was a member of the silver medal-winning teams at the 2022 Commonwealth Games and the 2023 Pan American Games. Individually, he is the 2022 Pan American and 2023 Pan American Games silver medalist and 2022 Commonwealth Games bronze medalist on pommel horse.

== Gymnastics career ==
=== 2021 ===
In October Rampersad competed at the 2021 World Artistic Gymnastics Championships; he finished 87th on pommel horse during qualification.

=== 2022 ===
In July, Rampersad was selected to compete at both the Pan American Championships and the Commonwealth Games. At the Pan American Championships he finished second on pommel horse behind Yul Moldauer. During the team final, Rampersad helped Canada finish third behind the US and Brazil. At the Commonwealth Games, Rampersad helped Canada place second behind England. Individually he qualified to the pommel horse final, on which he won bronze behind Joe Fraser and Rhys McClenaghan.

=== 2023 ===
In October, Rampersad competed at the 2023 World Championships. During qualifications he helped Canada finish fourth, which qualified Canada a team berth to the 2024 Olympic Games, a feat last achieved by the Canadian men's gymnastics team in 2008. During the team final Rampersad contributed a score on pommel horse towards Canada's seventh-place finish.

Rampersad next competed at the Pan American Games. On the first day of competition he helped the Canadian team win the silver medal behind the United States. Individually he qualified to the pommel horse final. On the first day of event finals, Rampersad won silver on pommel horse behind compatriot Zachary Clay.

== Competitive history ==
Competitive history of Jayson Rampersad at the junior level
Year	Event	Team	AA	FX	PH	SR	VT	PB	HB
2018	Canadian Championships		4		1st place, gold medalist(s)	3rd place, bronze medalist(s)		3rd place, bronze medalist(s)	3rd place, bronze medalist(s)
2019	Elite Canada		8	5					6
2019	UCIC Calgary		13						
2019	Canadian Championships		7		1st place, gold medalist(s)			4	

Competitive history of Jayson Rampersad at the senior level
Year	Event	Team	AA	FX	PH	SR	VT	PB	HB
2021	Mersin Challenge Cup				8				
2021	World Championships				87				
2022	Canadian Championships		3rd place, bronze medalist(s)		1st place, gold medalist(s)				
2022	Pan American Championships	3rd place, bronze medalist(s)			2nd place, silver medalist(s)				
2022	Commonwealth Games	2nd place, silver medalist(s)			3rd place, bronze medalist(s)				
2023	Elite Canada		3rd place, bronze medalist(s)						
2023	Canadian Championships				1st place, gold medalist(s)				
2023	RomGym Trophy	2nd place, silver medalist(s)			1st place, gold medalist(s)				
2023	World Championships	7							
2023	Pan American Games	2nd place, silver medalist(s)			2nd place, silver medalist(s)				
2024	Elite Canada				1st place, gold medalist(s)	13			
2024	DTB Pokal Team Challenge	11							
2024	Pacific Rim Championships	2nd place, silver medalist(s)			1st place, gold medalist(s)				
2024	Canadian Championships				5				
2025	World University Games	2nd place, silver medalist(s)							
