= Kentaro Yunoki =

Japanese artistic gymnast

- Full name: 柚木 健大朗
- Born: 5 July 1997 (age 29)
- Height: 1.69 m (5 ft 7 in)

Gymnastics career
- Discipline: Men's artistic gymnastics
- Country represented: Japan
- College team: Nittaidai
- Club: Tokushukai
- Head coaches: Yuji Sano; Yuya Shintaku; Naoki Morichika
Medal record
Representing Japan
FIG World Cup
| Bronze medal – third place | 2019 Paris | Rings |
| Bronze medal – third place | 2018 Guimaraes | Rings |

Kentaro Yunoki (柚木 健大朗, Kentaro Yunoki; born 5 July 1997) is a Japanese artistic gymnast. Born in Okayama, Japan, he graduated from Nippon Sport Science University and later join Tokushukai Gymnastics Club. Yunoki has represented Japan at several FIG World Cup competitions.

== See also ==
- Japan men's national gymnastics team
