= Scott Morgan (gymnast) =

Canadian artistic gymnast

- Born: 20 June 1989 (age 37) North Vancouver, British Columbia, Canada
- Height: 160 cm (5 ft 3 in)

Gymnastics career
- Discipline: Men's artistic gymnastics
- Country represented: Canada; (2009–Present)
- Club: Flicka Gymnastics Club
- Head coach: Vali Stan
Medal record
Commonwealth Games
Gold medal – first place	2014 Glasgow	Rings
Gold medal – first place	2014 Glasgow	Vault
Silver medal – second place	2014 Glasgow	Floor
Silver medal – second place	2018 Gold Coast	Rings
Silver medal – second place	2018 Gold Coast	Floor Exercise
Bronze medal – third place	2014 Glasgow	Team
Bronze medal – third place	2018 Gold Coast	Team
Pacific Rim Championships
Gold medal – first place	2014 Richmond	Floor
Bronze medal – third place	2014 Richmond	Rings
Bronze medal – third place	2014 Richmond	Team
Bronze medal – third place	2012 Everett	Vault

Scott Morgan (born 20 June 1989) is an elite level Canadian artistic gymnast who represented Canada in the 2014 Commonwealth Games, winning two gold medals, and represented Canada in the 2016 Summer Olympics held in Rio de Janeiro. Morgan is coached by Vali Stan and a member of the Flicka gymnastics club. Morgan is considered one of the best male gymnasts in Canada.

== Early life and education ==
Morgan began gymnastics when he was four years old at the Flicka gymnastics club. His parents were the first to get him involved. However, while in high school, he quit gymnastics for four years.

== Gymnastics career ==
In 2007, he returned to the sport, saying: "Pretty much within the first week back I was like, 'man, why did I ever leave?' It was just so much fun." At the 2011 Puerto Rico cup, Morgan won silver in the Vault, and bronze on Floor. Next Morgan attended the 2013 World Artistic Gymnastics Championships Morgan came eighth on Floor and nineteenth on Rings.

During the 2014 Commonwealth Games Morgan contributed a score of 44.799 for Canada in the Team Finals. He qualified for the Floor finals with a score of 14.933, the rings finals with a score of 15.200 and the Vault final with a score of 14.666. On 30 July, Morgan won gold in the Rings final with a score of 15.100, and silver in the Floor final with a score of 15.133. He came second to England's Max Whitlock. He won gold in the Vault final on 1 August, with a score of 14.733. Morgan stated at the Glasgow Games that it was his ambition to go to the 2016 Summer Olympics held in Rio de Janeiro.

Morgan went on to compete in the 2016 Summer Olympics as Canada's only man in artistic gymnastics. Morgan came eighteenth for the Floor, twenty-seventh for the Rings, and fourteenth for the Vault.

In 2017, Morgan competed in the Canadian Championships in Montreal, winning gold for Floor and Rings, and coming in eighth place for Vault. He also competed in the 2017 World Championships, which were also in Montreal, coming in eighteenth for Floor and twenty-sixth for Rings.

In 2018, Morgan competed in the Canadian Championships in Waterloo, Ontario, winning gold for Floor and bronze for Vault. Afterwards, Morgan competed in the 2018 Commonwealth Games in the Gold Coast, Australia, winning silver for Team, silver for Floor, bronze for Rings, and fifth for Vault. Morgan then competed in the University of Calgary International Cup, winning gold for Rings, silver for Floor, and bronze for Vault.
