= Jac Davies =

Welsh rugby union player

- Born: Jac Davies; 11 September 2003 (age 23) Cardiff, Wales
- Height: 183 cm (6 ft 0 in)
- Weight: 85 kg (187 lb)
- School: Ysgol Gyfun Gymraeg Glantaf

Rugby union career
- Position: Fullback
- Current team: Scarlets
Youth career
- Pentyrch RFC
Senior career
Years	Team	Apps	(Points)
2022	Pontypridd	8	(10)
2022–2023	Llanelli	18	(30)
2023–	Llandovery	37	(70)
2024–	Scarlets	4	(0)
International career
Years	Team	Apps	(Points)
2023	Wales U20	2	(0)

Jac Davies (born 11 September 2003) is a Welsh rugby union player who plays for the Scarlets as a fullback.

== Early career ==
Coming through local club Pentyrch RFC, Davies attended Ysgol Gyfun Gymraeg Glantaf, where he played for their rugby team. In 2022, Davies joined Pontypridd RFC, featuring eight times for the club.

== Club career ==
=== Scarlets ===
Davies signed an academy contract with the Scarlets in 2022. Davies was tipped to make his professional debut during the 2023–24 United Rugby Championship, but missed out due to an ankle injury. He signed his first professional contract with the team on 6 June 2024.

Davies made his debut on 21 September 2024, in the opening round of the URC, against Benetton. His first start came on 25 January 2025, on the wing in the victory over Edinburgh. His European debut came on 6 December 2025 against Bristol Bears, and had a potential try ruled out. His first competitive try came on 18 January 2026, against Northampton Saints, earning the Scarlets a bonus point.

While with the Scarlets academy, Davies played for Llanelli RFC and Llandovery RFC. He won the 2025–26 Super Rygbi Cymru title with Llandovery, setting up a try forHarri Doel in the final.

Davies signed a senior contract with the Scarlets on 7 May 2026. Davies was recognised as the Senior Academy Player of the Season.

== International career ==
=== Wales U20 ===
Davies was part of the Wales U20 squad for the 2023 Six Nations Under 20s Championship.

In January 2025, he played against the U20 side for a Welsh Academies U23 team.
