= Polina Kozitskiy =

American rhythmic gymnast

- Born: December 29, 1995 (age 30)

Gymnastics career
- Discipline: Rhythmic gymnastics
- Country represented: United States (2011)
Medal record
Rhythmic gymnastics
Representing the United States
Pacific Rim Championships
Gold medal – first place	2012 Everett	Hoop
Silver medal – second place	2012 Everett	All-around
Silver medal – second place	2012 Everett	Clubs

Polina Kozitskiy (born December 29, 1995) was an American individual rhythmic gymnast. She represented her nation at international competitions.

She competed at world championships, including at the 2011 World Rhythmic Gymnastics Championships.
