= Gymnastics at the 2022 Commonwealth Games – Men's parallel bars =

Men's parallel bars at the 2022 Commonwealth Games
- Venue: Arena Birmingham
- Dates: 29 July 2022 (qualification); 2 August 2022 (final)
- Competitors: 8 from 5 nations
- Winning score: 15.000

Medalists
gold medal	Joe Fraser	England
silver medal	Giarnni Regini-Moran	England
bronze medal	Marios Georgiou	Cyprus

The men's parallel bars gymnastics competition at the 2022 Commonwealth Games in Birmingham, England was held on 2 August 2022 at Arena Birmingham.

== Schedule ==
The schedule was as follows:

All times are British Summer Time (UTC+1)

Date	Time	Round
Friday 29 July 2022	09:08	Qualification
Tuesday 2 August 2022	14:05	Final

== Results ==
=== Qualification ===
Qualification for this apparatus final was determined within the team final. The results are as follows:

Rank	Gymnast	Difficulty	Execution	Penalty	Total	Notes
1	Giarnni Regini-Moran (ENG)	6.100	8.750		14.850	Q
2	Joe Fraser (ENG)	6.500	8.100		14.600	Q
3	Mitchell Morgans (AUS)	6.100	8.400		14.500	Q
4	Brinn Bevan (WAL)	6.100	8.350		14.450	Q
5	Félix Dolci (CAN)	5.900	8.500		14.400	Q
6	Marios Georgiou (CYP)	5.800	8.550		14.350	Q
7	Ilias Georgiou (CYP)	5.600	8.700		14.300	Q
8	Tyson Bull (AUS)	5.400	8.650		14.050	Q
9	Saif Tamboli (IND)	5.800	8.250		14.050	R1
10	Jesse Moore (AUS)	5.500	8.400		13.900	–
11	Chris Kaji (CAN)	5.500	8.400		13.900	R2
12	Jake Jarman (ENG)	5.600	8.200		13.800	–
13	Pavel Karnejenko (SCO)	5.600	8.200		13.800	R3
14	Mikhail Koudinov (NZL)	5.800	7.950		13.750	
15	Hamish Carter (SCO)	5.000	8.600		13.600	
16	Daniel Lee (JEY)	5.100	8.500		13.600	
17	Clay Mason Stephens (AUS)	5.000	8.550		13.550	
18	Yogeshwar Singh (IND)	4.900	8.550		13.450	
19	James Hall (ENG)	5.700	7.750		13.450	
20	Frank Baines (SCO)	4.600	8.750		13.350	
21	Michael Reid (JAM)	5.500	7.850		13.350	
22	Joe Cemlyn-Jones (WAL)	4.900	8.400		13.300	
23	Kenji Tamane (CAN)	4.500	8.650		13.150	
24	Muhammad Khaalid Mia (RSA)	4.800	8.150		12.950	
25	Michalis Chari (CYP)	3.900	8.850		12.750	
26	Mathys Jalbert (CAN)	5.100	7.600		12.700	
27	Cameron Lynn (SCO)	4.700	7.950		12.650	
28	Jacob Edwards (WAL)	4.400	8.200		12.600	
29	Jorden O'Connell-Inns (NZL)	4.400	8.150		12.550	
30	Samuel Dick (NZL)	4.500	7.950		12.450	
31	Joshua Cook (WAL)	4.900	7.300		12.200	
32	Georgios Angonas (CYP)	4.900	7.150		12.050	
33	Ruchira Fernando (SRI)	3.500	7.750		11.250	
34	Igor Magalhães (CAY)	3.600	7.600		11.200	
35	Karthik Adapa (CAY)	3.500	7.650		11.150	
36	Ethan Dick (NZL)	5.100	6.050		11.150	
37	Shishir Ahmed (BAN)	2.400	7.100	-3.0	6.500	
38	Abu Saeed Rafi (BAN)	2.200	7.700	-4.0	5.900	
	Hansa Kumarasinghege (SRI)	DNS				

=== Final ===
The results are as follows:

Rank	Gymnast	Difficulty	Execution	Penalty	Total
1st place, gold medalist(s)	Joe Fraser (ENG)	6.500	8.500		15.000
2nd place, silver medalist(s)	Giarnni Regini-Moran (ENG)	6.100	8.633		14.733
3rd place, bronze medalist(s)	Marios Georgiou (CYP)	5.800	8.733		14.533
4	Félix Dolci (CAN)	5.900	8.300		14.200
5	Mitchell Morgans (AUS)	5.700	8.066		13.766
6	Ilias Georgiou (CYP)	5.600	8.000		13.600
7	Brinn Bevan (WAL)	5.700	7.700		13.400
8	Tyson Bull (AUS)	5.400	7.733		13.133
