= Gymnastics at the 2022 Commonwealth Games – Men's horizontal bar =

Men's horizontal bar at the 2022 Commonwealth Games
- Venue: Arena Birmingham
- Dates: 29 July 2022 (qualification); 2 August 2022 (final)
- Competitors: 8 from 4 nations
- Winning score: 14.466

Medalists
gold medal	Ilias Georgiou	Cyprus
silver medal	Tyson Bull	Australia
bronze medal	Marios Georgiou	Cyprus

The Men's horizontal bar gymnastics competition at the 2022 Commonwealth Games in Birmingham, England was held on 2 August 2022 at Arena Birmingham.

== Schedule ==
The schedule was as follows:

All times are British Summer Time (UTC+1)

Date	Time	Round
Friday 29 July 2022	09:08	Qualification
Tuesday 2 August 2022	15:40	Final

== Results ==
=== Qualification ===
Qualification for this apparatus final was determined within the team final. The results are as follows:

Rank	Gymnast	Difficulty	Execution	Penalty	Total	Notes
1	Joe Fraser (ENG)	5.800	8.700		14.500	Q
2	Jesse Moore (AUS)	5.200	8.950		14.150	Q
3	Ilias Georgiou (CYP)	5.300	8.850		14.150	Q
4	James Hall (ENG)	5.500	8.500		14.000	Q
5	Marios Georgiou (CYP)	5.500	8.400		13.900	Q
6	Mitchell Morgans (AUS)	5.500	8.350		13.850	Q
7	Hamish Carter (SCO)	4.600	8.900		13.500	Q
8	Clay Mason Stephens (AUS)	5.100	8.350		13.450	–
9	Jake Jarman (ENG)	4.600	8.800		13.400	–
10	Giarnni Regini-Moran (ENG)	5.100	8.250		13.350	–
11	Frank Baines (SCO)	4.500	8.750		13.250	Q
12	Georgios Angonas (CYP)	4.600	8.650		13.250	–
13	Tyson Bull (AUS)	5.600	7.650		13.250	–
14	Joshua Cook (WAL)	5.000	8.100		13.100	R1
15	Chris Kaji (CAN)	4.500	8.300		12.800	R2
16	Muhammad Khaalid Mia (RSA)	4.600	8.200		12.800	R3
17	Brinn Bevan (WAL)	4.800	8.000		12.800	
18	Félix Dolci (CAN)	5.300	7.500		12.800	
19	Yogeshwar Singh (IND)	4.500	8.200		12.700	
20	Ethan Dick (NZL)	4.200	8.400		12.600	
21	Pavel Karnejenko (SCO)	4.500	8.050		12.550	
22	Mathys Jalbert (CAN)	4.600	7.850		12.450	
23	Jacob Edwards (WAL)	4.100	8.100		12.200	
24	Samuel Dick (NZL)	3.400	8.750		12.150	
25	Daniel Lee (JEY)	4.400	7.650		12.050	
26	Kenji Tamane (CAN)	4.600	7.450		12.050	
27	Cameron Lynn (SCO)	4.800	7.250		12.050	
28	Mikhail Koudinov (NZL)	5.000	6.650		11.650	
29	Michalis Chari (CYP)	3.800	7.700		11.500	
30	Joe Cemlyn-Jones (WAL)	4.800	6.550		11.350	
31	Igor Magalhães (CAY)	3.200	8.050		11.250	
32	Ruchira Fernando (SRI)	3.000	7.700		10.700	
33	Jorden O'Connell-Inns (NZL)	3.600	7.000		10.600	
34	Karthik Adapa (CAY)	2.800	7.350		10.150	
35	Shishir Ahmed (BAN)	1.800	5.150	-4.0	2.950	
	Hansa Kumarasinghege (SRI)	DNS				

=== Final ===
The final began at 15:40 local time.

Rank	Gymnast	Difficulty	Execution	Penalty	Total
1st place, gold medalist(s)	Ilias Georgiou (CYP)	5.900	8.566		14.466
2nd place, silver medalist(s)	Tyson Bull (AUS)	5.500	8.733		14.233
3rd place, bronze medalist(s)	Marios Georgiou (CYP)	5.800	8.333		14.133
4	Mitchell Morgans (AUS)	5.700	8.400		14.100
5	James Hall (ENG)	5.600	8.300		13.900
6	Hamish Carter (SCO)	4.600	7.833		12.433
7	Joe Fraser (ENG)	5.700	6.566		12.266
8	Frank Baines (SCO)	4.400	7.500		11.900
