= Gymnastics at the 2022 Commonwealth Games – Men's rings =

Men's rings at the 2022 Commonwealth Games
- Venue: Arena Birmingham
- Dates: 29 July 2022 (qualification); 1 August 2022 (final)
- Competitors: 8 from 6 nations
- Winning score: 14.400

Medalists
gold medal	Courtney Tulloch	England
silver medal	Sokratis Pilakouris	Cyprus
bronze medal	Chris Kaji	Canada

The Men's rings gymnastics competition at the 2022 Commonwealth Games in Birmingham, England was held on 1 August 2022 at Arena Birmingham.

== Schedule ==
The schedule was as follows:

All times are British Summer Time (UTC+1)

Date	Time	Round
Friday 29 July 2022	09:08	Qualification
Monday 1 August 2022	15:45	Final

== Results ==
=== Qualification ===
Qualification for this apparatus final was determined within the team final. The results are as follows:

Rank	Gymnast	Difficulty	Execution	Penalty	Total	Notes
1	Courtney Tulloch (ENG)	6.100	8.600		14.700	Q
2	Joe Fraser (ENG)	5.600	8.850		14.450	Q
3	Félix Dolci (CAN)	5.400	9.000		14.400	Q
4	Sokratis Pilakouris (CYP)	5.600	8.800		14.400	Q
5	Pavel Karnejenko (SCO)	5.600	8.600		14.200	Q
6	Chris Kaji (CAN)	5.900	8.200		14.100	Q
7	Kenji Tamane (CAN)	5.700	8.050		13.750	–
8	James Hall (ENG)	5.000	8.700		13.700	–
9	Jesse Moore (AUS)	4.900	8.500		13.400	Q
10	Ilias Georgiou (CYP)	4.700	8.650		13.350	Q
11	Daniel Lee (JEY)	4.600	8.700		13.300	R1
12	Jake Jarman (ENG)	4.600	8.650		13.250	–
13	Frank Baines (SCO)	4.300	8.900		13.200	R2
14	Samuel Dick (NZL)	4.700	8.500		13.200	R3
15	Mikhail Koudinov (NZL)	4.400	8.750		13.150	
16	Brinn Bevan (WAL)	4.400	8.700		13.100	
17	Joe Cemlyn-Jones (WAL)	5.000	8.100		13.100	
18	Cameron Lynn (SCO)	4.300	8.700		13.000	
19	Jacob Edwards (WAL)	4.500	8.450		12.950	
19	Marios Georgiou (CYP)	4.500	8.450		12.950	
21	Hamish Carter (SCO)	4.300	8.600		12.900	
22	Clay Mason Stephens (AUS)	4.300	8.550		12.850	
23	Ethan Dick (NZL)	3.800	8.900		12.700	
24	Georgios Angonas (CYP)	4.000	8.600		12.600	
25	William Fu-Allen (NZL)	4.000	8.350		12.350	
26	Muhammad Khaalid Mia (RSA)	4.300	7.800		12.100	
27	Joshua Cook (WAL)	5.200	6.900		12.100	
28	Yogeshwar Singh (IND)	4.200	7.750		11.950	
29	Mathys Jalbert (CAN)	3.600	7.600		11.200	
30	Igor Magalhães (CAY)	3.300	7.600		10.900	
31	Mitchell Morgans (AUS)	4.300	6.650	-0.3	10.650	
32	Ruchira Fernando (SRI)	3.100	7.450	-0.3	10.250	
33	Karthik Adapa (CAY)	3.200	7.100	-0.3	10.000	
34	Shishir Ahmed (BAN)	2.300	7.600	-5.3	4.600	
35	Muhammad Afzal (PAK)	2.700	5.850	-4.3	4.250	
36	Hansa Kumarasinghege (SRI)	2.300	7.150	-5.3	4.150	
37	Abu Saeed Rafi (BAN)	1.800	7.500	-6.3	3.000	

=== Final ===
The results are as follows:

Rank	Gymnast	Difficulty	Execution	Penalty	Total
1st place, gold medalist(s)	Courtney Tulloch (ENG)	6.100	8.300		14.400
2nd place, silver medalist(s)	Sokratis Pilakouris (CYP)	5.900	8.400		14.300
3rd place, bronze medalist(s)	Chris Kaji (CAN)	5.900	8.366		14.266
4	Joe Fraser (ENG)	5.600	8.500		14.100
5	Félix Dolci (CAN)	5.400	8.566		13.966
6	Pavel Karnejenko (SCO)	5.600	8.166		13.766
7	Daniel Lee (JEY)	4.600	8.300		12.900
8	Samuel Dick (NZL)	4.700	8.200		12.900
