= Gymnastics at the 2022 Commonwealth Games =

- (From left to right) Artistic, Rhythmic
- Venue: Arena Birmingham
- Dates: 29 July – 2 August 2022 (artistic); 4–6 August 2022 (rhythmic)
- Competitors: 132 from 22 nations

Gymnastics at the 2022 Commonwealth Games was the tenth appearance of Gymnastics at the Commonwealth Games. The gymnastics competition was held in Birmingham, England from 29 July to 6 August 2022. The sport made its tenth appearance since its 1978 debut and its second appearance within England specifically, spread across twenty events.

== Schedule ==
The competition schedule was as follows:

Q	Qualification	F	Final

Artistic
Date Event	Fri 29	Sat 30	Sun 31	Mon 1	Tue 2
Men's team all-around	F				
Men's individual all-around	Q		F		
Men's floor	Q			F	
Men's pommel horse	Q			F	
Men's rings	Q			F	
Men's vault	Q				F
Men's parallel bars	Q				F
Men's horizontal bar	Q				F
Women's team all-around		F			
Women's individual all-around		Q	F		
Women's vault		Q		F	
Women's uneven bars		Q		F	
Women's balance beam		Q			F
Women's floor		Q			F

Rhythmic
Date Event	Thu 4	Fri 5	Sat 6
Team all-around	F		
Individual all-around	Q	F	
Hoop	Q		F
Ball	Q		F
Clubs	Q		F
Ribbon	Q		F

== Venue ==
The gymnastics competitions are being held at Arena Birmingham, a venue which has played host to more than 30 sports in its history.

== Medal summary ==
=== Medal table ===
* Host nation (England)

Rank	CGA	Gold	Silver	Bronze	Total
1	England*	11	5	2	18
2	Australia	4	5	3	12
3	Malaysia	2	0	1	3
4	Canada	1	5	7	13
5	Cyprus	1	3	5	9
6	Wales	1	0	0	1
7	Scotland	0	1	1	2
8	Northern Ireland	0	1	0	1
9	South Africa	0	0	1	1
Totals (9 entries)		20	20	20	60

=== Artistic ===
==== Men's events ====
Event	Gold	Silver	Bronze
Team all-around	England; Joe Fraser; James Hall; Jake Jarman; Giarnni Regini-Moran; Courtney Tulloch	Canada; Félix Dolci; Mathys Jalbert; Chris Kaji; Jayson Rampersad; Kenji Tamane	Cyprus; Georgios Angonas; Michalis Chari; Ilias Georgiou; Marios Georgiou; Sokratis Pilakouris
Individual all-around	Jake Jarman; England	James Hall; England	Marios Georgiou; Cyprus
Floor exercise	Jake Jarman; England	Félix Dolci; Canada	Giarnni Regini-Moran; England
Pommel horse	Joe Fraser; England	Rhys McClenaghan; Northern Ireland	Jayson Rampersad; Canada
Rings	Courtney Tulloch; England	Sokratis Pilakouris; Cyprus	Chris Kaji; Canada
Vault	Jake Jarman; England	Giarnni Regini-Moran; England	James Bacueti; Australia
Parallel bars	Joe Fraser; England	Giarnni Regini-Moran; England	Marios Georgiou; Cyprus
Horizontal bar	Ilias Georgiou; Cyprus	Tyson Bull; Australia	Marios Georgiou; Cyprus

==== Women's events ====
Event	Gold	Silver	Bronze
Team all-around	England; Ondine Achampong; Georgia-Mae Fenton; Claudia Fragapane; Alice Kinsella; Kelly Simm	Australia; Romi Brown; Georgia Godwin; Kate McDonald; Breanna Scott; Emily Whitehead	Canada; Laurie Denommée; Jenna Lalonde; Cassie Lee; Emma Spence; Maya Zonneveld
Individual all-around	Georgia Godwin; Australia	Ondine Achampong; England	Emma Spence; Canada
Vault	Georgia Godwin; Australia	Laurie Denommée; Canada	Shannon Archer; Scotland
Uneven bars	Georgia-Mae Fenton; England	Georgia Godwin; Australia	Caitlin Rooskrantz; South Africa
Balance beam	Kate McDonald; Australia	Georgia Godwin; Australia	Emma Spence; Canada
Floor exercise	Alice Kinsella; England	Ondine Achampong; England	Emily Whitehead; Australia

=== Rhythmic ===
Event	Gold	Silver	Bronze
Team all-around	Canada; Tatiana Cocsanova; Carmel Kallemaa; Suzanna Shahbazian	Australia; Ashari Gill; Lidiia Iakovleva; Alexandra Kiroi-Bogatyreva	England; Marfa Ekimova; Alice Leaper; Saffron Severn
Individual all-around	Marfa Ekimova; England	Anna Sokolova; Cyprus	Alexandra Kiroi-Bogatyreva; Australia
Hoop	Gemma Frizelle; Wales	Anna Sokolova; Cyprus	Carmel Kallemaa; Canada
Ball	Ng Joe Ee; Malaysia	Suzanna Shahbazian; Canada	Anna Sokolova; Cyprus
Clubs	Alexandra Kiroi-Bogatyreva; Australia	Carmel Kallemaa; Canada	Izzah Amzan; Malaysia
Ribbon	Ng Joe Ee; Malaysia	Louise Christie; Scotland	Carmel Kallemaa; Canada

== Participating nations ==
There were 22 participating Commonwealth Games Associations (CGA's) in gymnastics with a total of 132 (56 men and 76 women) athletes. The number of athletes a nation entered is in parentheses beside the name of the country.

=== Artistic ===
A total of 103 (56 men and 47 women) artistic gymnasts from 21 CGA's competed.

- Australia (10)
- Bangladesh (3)
- Barbados (1)
- Canada (10)
- Cayman Islands (2)
- Cyprus (6)
- England (10)
- India (6)
- Isle of Man (1)
- Jamaica (2)
- Jersey (1)
- Malaysia (2)
- New Zealand (5)
- Northern Ireland (3)
- Pakistan (1)
- Scotland (9)
- Singapore (7)
- South Africa (6)
- Sri Lanka (7)
- Trinidad and Tobago (1)
- Wales (10)

=== Rhythmic ===
A total of 29 rhythmic gymnasts from 13 CGA's competed.

- Australia (3)
- Canada (3)
- Cyprus (3)
- England (3)
- Gibraltar (2)
- India (1)
- Malaysia (3)
- New Zealand (2)
- Scotland (1)
- Singapore (3)
- South Africa (1)
- Sri Lanka (1)
- Wales (3)

== Controversies ==
On 26 May 2022, Northern Irish gymnast and reigning Commonwealth Games champion on pommel horse, Rhys McClenaghan, announced on Twitter that he and his teammates, Eamon Montgomery and Ewan McAteer, would not be allowed by the International Gymnastics Federation (FIG) to compete at the 2022 Commonwealth Games due to them representing Ireland in international competition where Northern Ireland does not compete. The FIG stated that Irish gymnasts competing for Northern Ireland would be "a violation of the FIG Statutes and rules" and recommended that the athletes concerned change their FIG license nationality (in effect, switch to a British licence) if they wished to regain eligibility. The Northern Ireland Commonwealth Games Council accused the FIG of "completely disregarding" the 1998 Good Friday Agreement which states that people from Northern Ireland can consider themselves British, Irish, or both; at the time, no other ASOIF member federation associated with the Commonwealth Games had adopted the FIG's stance.

On 27 June the decision was overturned and the three Northern Irish gymnasts were permitted to compete at the Commonwealth Games for Northern Ireland while still representing the island of Ireland at other international competitions.
