= Gymnastics at the 2022 Commonwealth Games – Men's artistic team all-around =

Men's artistic team all-around at the 2022 Commonwealth Games
- Venue: Arena Birmingham
- Dates: 29 July 2022
- Competitors: 47 from 11 nations
- Winning score: 254.550

Medalists
gold medal	James Hall; Courtney Tulloch; Joe Fraser; Jake Jarman; Giarnni Regini-Moran	England
silver medal	Félix Dolci; Mathys Jalbert; Chris Kaji; Jayson Rampersad; Kenji Tamane	Canada
bronze medal	Michalis Chari; Sokratis Pilakouris; Georgios Angonas; Ilias Georgiou; Marios Georgiou	Cyprus

The Men's artistic team all-around gymnastics competition at the 2022 Commonwealth Games in Birmingham, England was held on 29 July 2022 at Arena Birmingham.

This event also determined the qualification standings for the individual all-around and apparatus finals.

== Schedule ==
The schedule was as follows:

All times are British Summer Time (UTC+1)

Date	Time	Round
Friday 29 July 2022	09:08	Competition

== Results ==
=== Team competition ===
The results are as follows:

Rank	Country	Floor (gymnastics)	Pommel horse	Rings (gymnastics)	Vault (gymnastics)	Parallel bars	Horizontal bar	Total
1st place, gold medalist(s)	England	40.850 (1)	41.600 (1)	42.850 (1)	44.100 (1)	43.250 (1)	41.900 (1)	254.550
1st place, gold medalist(s)	Joe Fraser	—N/a	14.650	14.450	—N/a	14.600	14.500	254.550
1st place, gold medalist(s)	Jake Jarman	13.750	~~13.100~~	~~13.250~~	14.750	13.800	13.400	254.550
1st place, gold medalist(s)	Courtney Tulloch	—N/a	—N/a	14.700	—N/a	—N/a	—N/a	254.550
1st place, gold medalist(s)	Giarnni Regini-Moran	13.850	13.150	—N/a	15.000	14.850	~~13.350~~	254.550
1st place, gold medalist(s)	James Hall	13.250	13.800	13.700	14.350	~~13.450~~	14.000	254.550
2nd place, silver medalist(s)	Canada	38.650 (3)	38.600 (2)	42.250 (2)	42.200 (3)	41.450 (3)	38.050 (6)	241.200
2nd place, silver medalist(s)	Félix Dolci	13.450	~~10.600~~	14.400	14.250	14.400	12.800	241.200
2nd place, silver medalist(s)	Mathys Jalbert	—N/a	12.050	~~11.200~~	~~13.000~~	~~12.700~~	12.450	241.200
2nd place, silver medalist(s)	Chris Kaji	12.550	—N/a	14.100	14.350	13.900	12.800	241.200
2nd place, silver medalist(s)	Jayson Rampersad	~~10.450~~	13.250	—N/a	—N/a	—N/a	—N/a	241.200
2nd place, silver medalist(s)	Kenji Tamane	12.650	13.300	13.750	13.600	13.150	~~12.050~~	241.200
3rd place, bronze medalist(s)	Cyprus	36.700 (7)	37.900 (5)	40.700 (3)	41.650 (5)	41.400 (4)	41.300 (3)	239.650
3rd place, bronze medalist(s)	Michalis Chari	~~11.050~~	11.200	—N/a	13.700	12.750	~~11.500~~	239.650
3rd place, bronze medalist(s)	Sokratis Pilakouris	12.200	—N/a	14.400	—N/a	—N/a	—N/a	239.650
3rd place, bronze medalist(s)	Georgios Angonas	11.800	~~10.700~~	~~12.600~~	13.800	~~12.050~~	13.250	239.650
3rd place, bronze medalist(s)	Ilias Georgiou	—N/a	12.850	13.350	—N/a	14.300	14.150	239.650
3rd place, bronze medalist(s)	Marios Georgiou	12.700	13.850	12.950	14.150	14.350	13.900	239.650
4	Australia	38.350 (4)	37.450 (7)	36.900 (7)	42.400 (2)	42.450 (2)	41.450 (2)	239.000
4	Jesse Moore	12.850	13.500	13.400	13.550	13.900	14.150	239.000
4	Tyson Bull	—N/a	12.800	—N/a	—N/a	14.050	13.250	239.000
4	Mitchell Morgans	—N/a	—N/a	10.650	—N/a	14.500	13.850	239.000
4	James Bacueti	12.100	11.150	—N/a	14.600	—N/a	—N/a	239.000
4	Clay Mason Stephens	13.400	11.050	12.850	14.250	13.550	13.450	239.000
5	Scotland	36.950 (6)	38.500 (3)	40.400 (4)	41.900 (4)	40.750 (5)	39.300 (4)	237.800
5	Frank Baines	13.300	12.650	13.200	14.150	13.350	13.250	237.800
5	Pavel Karnejenko	11.650	12.300	14.200	13.950	13.800	12.550	237.800
5	Hamish Carter	11.800	12.850	12.900	13.800	13.600	13.500	237.800
5	David Weir	11.850	—N/a	—N/a	12.950	—N/a	—N/a	237.800
5	Cameron Lynn	—N/a	13.000	13.000	—N/a	12.650	12.050	237.800
6	Wales	40.250 (2)	37.550 (6)	39.150 (5)	40.900 (7)	40.350 (6)	38.100 (5)	236.300
6	Emil Barber	13.650	—N/a	—N/a	14.150	—N/a	—N/a	236.300
6	Josh Cook	12.600	12.300	12.100	13.600	12.200	13.100	236.300
6	Brinn Bevan	—N/a	12.500	13.100	—N/a	14.450	12.800	236.300
6	Jacob Edwards	13.200	11.850	12.950	13.050	12.600	12.200	236.300
6	Joe Cemlyn-Jones	13.400	12.750	13.100	13.150	13.300	11.350	236.300
7	New Zealand	37.650 (5)	38.150 (4)	39.050 (6)	41.600 (6)	38.750 (7)	36.400 (7)	231.600
7	Ethan Dick	12.400	13.400	12.700	13.850	11.150	12.600	231.600
7	Samuel Dick	12.500	—N/a	13.200	13.850	12.450	12.150	231.600
7	William Fu-Allen	12.350	8.200	12.350	—N/a	—N/a	—N/a	231.600
7	Mikhail Koudinov	12.750	11.550	13.150	13.900	13.750	11.650	231.600
7	Jorden O'Connell-Inns	—N/a	13.200	—N/a	13.850	12.550	10.600	231.600
8	India	19.150 (9)	11.200 (10)	11.950 (9)	26.400 (9)	27.500 (8)	12.700 (8)	108.900
8	Yogeshwar Singh	11.300	11.200	11.950	13.000	13.450	12.700	108.900
8	Saif Tamboli	—N/a	—N/a	—N/a	—N/a	14.050	—N/a	108.900
8	Satyajit Mondal	7.850	—N/a	—N/a	13.400	—N/a	—N/a	108.900
9	Bangladesh	30.950 (8)	9.100 (11)	7.600 (10)	37.600 (8)	12.400 (9)	2.950 (10)	100.600
9	Abu Saeed Rafi	10.050	7.000	3.000	11.950	5.900	—N/a	100.600
9	Shishir Ahmed	9.100	2.100	4.600	11.950	6.500	2.950	100.600
9	Ali Kader Haque	11.800	—N/a	—N/a	13.700	—N/a	—N/a	100.600
10	Sri Lanka	11.200 (11)	21.050 (8)	14.400 (8)	23.250 (10)	11.250 (10)	10.700 (9)	91.850
10	Malin Fernando	Did not start						91.850
10	Ruchira Fernando	11.200	12.000	10.250	13.150	11.250	10.700	91.850
10	Hansa Kumarasinghege	—N/a	9.050	4.150	10.100	—N/a	—N/a	91.850
11	Northern Ireland	13.750 (10)	14.350 (9)	—	14.150 (11)	—	—	42.250
11	Ewan McAteer	—N/a	—N/a	—N/a	14.150	—N/a	—N/a	42.250
11	Eamon Montgomery	13.750	—N/a	—N/a	—N/a	—N/a	—N/a	42.250
11	Rhys McClenaghan	—N/a	14.350	—N/a	—N/a	—N/a	—N/a	42.250
Individual competitors
	Daniel Lee (JEY)	12.850	12.850	11.900	13.300	14.350	13.600	
	Muhammad Khaalid Mia (RSA)	12.400	8.850	12.100	13.150	12.950	12.800	
	Igor Magalhães (CAY)	10.200	9.250	10.900	12.800	11.200	11.250	
	Karthik Adapa (CAY)	10.600	9.100	10.000	11.600	11.150	10.150	
	Michael Reid (JAM)	—N/a	11.050	—N/a	—N/a	13.350	—N/a	
	Muhammad Sharul Aimy (MAS)	10.900	12.000	—N/a	13.950	—N/a	—N/a	
	Muhammad Afzal (PAK)	8.400	—N/a	4.250	10.375	—N/a	—N/a	
	Terry Tay (SGP)	12.800	—N/a	—N/a	13.350	—N/a	—N/a	
	Mikhail Haziq (SGP)	—N/a	11.750	—N/a	—N/a	—N/a	—N/a	

== Qualification results ==
=== Individual all-around ===
The results are as follows:

Rank	Country	Floor (gymnastics)	Pommel horse	Rings (gymnastics)	Vault (gymnastics)	Parallel bars	Horizontal bar	Total	Notes
1	James Hall (ENG)	13.250	13.800	13.700	14.350	13.450	14.000	82.550	Q
2	Jake Jarman (ENG)	13.750	13.100	13.250	14.750	13.800	13.400	82.050	Q
3	Marios Georgiou (CYP)	12.700	13.850	12.950	14.150	14.350	13.900	81.900	Q
4	Jesse Moore (AUS)	12.850	13.500	13.400	13.550	13.900	14.150	81.350	Q
5	Félix Dolci (CAN)	13.450	10.600	14.400	14.250	14.400	12.800	79.900	Q
6	Frank Baines (SCO)	13.300	12.650	13.200	14.150	13.350	13.250	79.900	Q
7	Clay Mason Stephens (AUS)	13.400	11.050	12.850	14.250	13.550	13.450	78.550	Q
8	Kenji Tamane (CAN)	12.650	13.300	13.750	13.600	13.150	12.050	78.500	Q
9	Pavel Karnejenko (SCO)	11.650	12.300	14.200	13.950	13.800	12.550	78.450	Q
10	Hamish Carter (SCO)	11.800	12.850	12.900	13.800	13.600	13.500	78.450	–
11	Daniel Lee (JEY)	12.850	11.900	13.300	14.350	13.600	12.050	78.050	Q
12	Joe Cemlyn-Jones (WAL)	13.400	12.750	13.100	13.150	13.300	11.350	77.050	WD
13	Mikhail Koudinov (NZL)	12.750	11.550	13.150	13.900	13.750	11.650	76.750	WD
14	Ethan Dick (NZL)	12.400	13.400	12.700	13.850	11.150	12.600	76.100	Q
15	Joshua Cook (WAL)	12.600	12.300	12.100	13.600	12.200	13.100	75.900	Q
16	Jacob Edwards (WAL)	13.200	11.850	12.950	13.050	12.600	12.200	75.850	Q
17	Georgios Angonas (CYP)	11.800	10.700	12.600	13.800	12.050	13.250	74.200	Q
18	Yogeshwar Singh (IND)	11.300	11.200	11.950	13.000	13.450	12.700	73.600	Q
19	Muhammad Khaalid Mia (RSA)	12.400	8.850	12.100	13.150	12.950	12.800	72.250	Q
20	Ruchira Fernando (SRI)	11.200	12.000	10.250	13.150	11.250	10.700	68.550	Q
21	Igor Magalhães (CAY)	10.200	9.250	10.900	12.800	11.200	11.250	65.600	R1', Q
22	Karthik Adapa (CAY)	10.600	9.100	10.000	11.600	11.150	10.150	62.600	R2
23	Shishir Ahmed (BAN)	9.100	2.100	4.600	11.950	6.500	2.950	37.200	R3
	Joe Fraser (ENG)	DNS	14.650	14.450	DNS	14.600	14.500	DNF	
	Hansa Kumarasinghege (SRI)	DNS	9.050	4.150	10.100	DNS	DNS	DNF	

=== Floor ===
The results are as follows:

Rank	Gymnast	Difficulty	Execution	Penalty	Total	Notes
1	Giarnni Regini-Moran (ENG)	5.900	8.050	-0.1	13.850	Q
2	Eamon Montgomery (NIR)	5.900	7.850		13.750	Q
3	Jake Jarman (ENG)	6.300	7.450		13.750	Q
4	Emil Barber (WAL)	5.700	7.950		13.650	Q
5	Félix Dolci (CAN)	6.000	7.750	-0.3	13.450	Q
6	Joe Cemlyn-Jones (WAL)	5.400	8.000		13.400	Q
7	Clay Mason Stephens (AUS)	5.700	7.700		13.400	Q
8	Frank Baines (SCO)	4.600	8.700		13.300	Q
9	James Hall (ENG)	5.900	7.350		13.250	–
10	Jacob Edwards (WAL)	5.700	7.500		13.200	–
11	Jesse Moore (AUS)	5.300	7.850	-0.3	12.850	R1
12	Daniel Lee (JEY)	5.100	7.750		12.850	R2
13	Terry Tay (SGP)	5.500	7.700	-0.4	12.800	R3
14	Mikhail Koudinov (NZL)	5.200	7.550		12.750	
15	Marios Georgiou (CYP)	5.400	7.300		12.700	
16	Kenji Tamane (CAN)	5.100	7.450		12.550	
17	Joshua Cook (WAL)	5.400	7.200		12.600	
18	Chris Kaji (CAN)	5.100	7.550		12.650	
19	Samuel Dick (NZL)	5.000	7.600	-0.1	12.500	
20	Ethan Dick (NZL)	4.900	7.500		12.400	
21	Muhammad Khaalid Mia (RSA)	5.100	7.300		12.400	
22	William Fu-Allen (NZL)	5.100	7.250		12.350	
23	Sokratis Pilakouris (CYP)	4.400	7.800		12.200	
24	James Bacueti (AUS)	5.800	6.400	-0.1	12.100	
25	David Weir (SCO)	5.100	6.750		11.850	
26	Georgios Angonas (CYP)	4.800	7.400	-0.4	11.800	
27	Ali Kader Haque (BAN)	4.500	7.400	-0.1	11.800	
28	Hamish Carter (SCO)	5.600	6.500	-0.3	11.800	
29	Pavel Karnejenko (SCO)	5.000	6.650		11.650	
30	Yogeshwar Singh (IND)	5.600	5.700		11.300	
31	Ruchira Fernando (SRI)	3.900	7.300		11.200	
32	Michalis Chari (CYP)	5.400	5.950	-0.3	11.050	
33	Muhammad Sharul Aimy (MAS)	5.300	5.600		10.900	
34	Karthik Adapa (CAY)	4.000	6.600		10.600	
35	Jayson Rampersad (CAN)	4.700	6.050	-0.3	10.450	
36	Igor Magalhães (CAY)	3.500	6.700		10.200	
37	Abu Saeed Rafi (BAN)	3.700	6.350		10.050	
38	Shishir Ahmed (BAN)	3.500	5.900	-0.3	9.100	
39	Muhammad Afzal (PAK)	2.900	5.500		8.400	
40	Satyajit Mondal (IND)	5.200	2.950	-0.3	7.850	
	Joe Fraser (ENG)	DNS				
	Hansa Kumarasinghege (SRI)	DNS				

=== Pommel horse ===
The results are as follows:

Rank	Gymnast	Difficulty	Execution	Penalty	Total	Notes
1	Joe Fraser (ENG)	6.100	8.550		14.650	Q
2	Rhys McClenaghan (NIR)	5.700	8.650		14.350	Q
3	Marios Georgiou (CYP)	5.400	8.450		13.850	Q
4	James Hall (ENG)	6.200	7.600		13.800	Q
5	Jesse Moore (AUS)	6.100	7.400		13.500	Q
6	Ethan Dick (NZL)	5.200	8.200		13.400	Q
7	Kenji Tamane (CAN)	5.600	7.700		13.300	Q
8	Jayson Rampersad (CAN)	5.900	7.350		13.250	Q
9	Jorden O'Connell-Inns (NZL)	5.600	7.600		13.200	R1
10	Giarnni Regini-Moran (ENG)	5.400	7.750		13.150	–
11	Jake Jarman (ENG)	5.900	7.200		13.100	–
12	Cameron Lynn (SCO)	4.900	8.100		13.000	R2
13	Ilias Georgiou (CYP)	4.900	7.950		12.850	R3
14	Hamish Carter (SCO)	5.300	7.550		12.850	
15	Tyson Bull (AUS)	4.300	8.500		12.800	
16	Joe Cemlyn-Jones (WAL)	4.500	8.250		12.750	
17	Frank Baines (SCO)	4.700	7.950		12.650	
18	Brinn Bevan (WAL)	4.800	7.700		12.500	
19	Joshua Cook (WAL)	5.000	7.300		12.300	
20	Pavel Karnejenko (SCO)	5.000	7.300		12.300	
21	Mathys Jalbert (CAN)	3.800	8.250		12.050	
22	Ruchira Fernando (SRI)	4.000	8.000		12.000	
23	Muhammad Sharul Aimy (MAS)	4.200	7.800		12.000	
24	Daniel Lee (JEY)	3.900	8.000		11.900	
25	Jacob Edwards (WAL)	4.900	6.950		11.850	
26	Mikhail Haziq (SGP)	3.800	7.950		11.750	
27	Mikhail Koudinov (NZL)	4.300	7.250		11.550	
28	Michalis Chari (CYP)	3.900	7.300		11.200	
29	Yogeshwar Singh (IND)	4.100	7.100		11.200	
30	James Bacueti (AUS)	5.200	5.950		11.150	
31	Clay Mason Stephens (AUS)	3.500	7.550		11.050	
32	Michael Reid (JAM)	5.400	5.650		11.050	
33	Georgios Angonas (CYP)	4.100	6.600		10.700	
34	Félix Dolci (CAN)	4.100	6.500		10.600	
35	Igor Magalhães (CAY)	3.000	6.250		9.250	
36	Karthik Adapa (CAY)	3.000	6.100		9.100	
37	Hansa Kumarasinghege (SRI)	2.900	6.150		9.050	
38	Muhammad Khaalid Mia (RSA)	5.000	3.850		8.850	
39	William Fu-Allen (NZL)	3.000	8.200	-3.0	8.200	
40	Abu Saeed Rafi (BAN)	2.500	7.500	-3.0	7.000	
41	Shishir Ahmed (BAN)	2.200	3.900	-4.0	2.100	

=== Rings ===
The results are as follows:

Rank	Gymnast	Difficulty	Execution	Penalty	Total	Notes
1	Courtney Tulloch (ENG)	6.100	8.600		14.700	Q
2	Joe Fraser (ENG)	5.600	8.850		14.450	Q
3	Félix Dolci (CAN)	5.400	9.000		14.400	Q
4	Sokratis Pilakouris (CYP)	5.600	8.800		14.400	Q
5	Pavel Karnejenko (SCO)	5.600	8.600		14.200	Q
6	Chris Kaji (CAN)	5.900	8.200		14.100	Q
7	Kenji Tamane (CAN)	5.700	8.050		13.750	–
8	James Hall (ENG)	5.000	8.700		13.700	–
9	Jesse Moore (AUS)	4.900	8.500		13.400	Q
10	Ilias Georgiou (CYP)	4.700	8.650		13.350	Q
11	Daniel Lee (JEY)	4.600	8.700		13.300	R1
12	Jake Jarman (ENG)	4.600	8.650		13.250	–
13	Frank Baines (SCO)	4.300	8.900		13.200	R2
14	Samuel Dick (NZL)	4.700	8.500		13.200	R3
15	Mikhail Koudinov (NZL)	4.400	8.750		13.150	
16	Brinn Bevan (WAL)	4.400	8.700		13.100	
17	Joe Cemlyn-Jones (WAL)	5.000	8.100		13.100	
18	Cameron Lynn (SCO)	4.300	8.700		13.000	
19	Jacob Edwards (WAL)	4.500	8.450		12.950	
19	Marios Georgiou (CYP)	4.500	8.450		12.950	
21	Hamish Carter (SCO)	4.300	8.600		12.900	
22	Clay Mason Stephens (AUS)	4.300	8.550		12.850	
23	Ethan Dick (NZL)	3.800	8.900		12.700	
24	Georgios Angonas (CYP)	4.000	8.600		12.600	
25	William Fu-Allen (NZL)	4.000	8.350		12.350	
26	Muhammad Khaalid Mia (RSA)	4.300	7.800		12.100	
27	Joshua Cook (WAL)	5.200	6.900		12.100	
28	Yogeshwar Singh (IND)	4.200	7.750		11.950	
29	Mathys Jalbert (CAN)	3.600	7.600		11.200	
30	Igor Magalhães (CAY)	3.300	7.600		10.900	
31	Mitchell Morgans (AUS)	4.300	6.650	-0.3	10.650	
32	Ruchira Fernando (SRI)	3.100	7.450	-0.3	10.250	
33	Karthik Adapa (CAY)	3.200	7.100	-0.3	10.000	
34	Shishir Ahmed (BAN)	2.300	7.600	-5.3	4.600	
35	Muhammad Afzal (PAK)	2.700	5.850	-4.3	4.250	
36	Hansa Kumarasinghege (SRI)	2.300	7.150	-5.3	4.150	
37	Abu Saeed Rafi (BAN)	1.800	7.500	-6.3	3.000	

=== Vault ===
The results are as follows:

Rank	Gymnast	Vault 1	Vault 2	Total	Notes
1	Jake Jarman (ENG)	14.750	15.200	14.975	Q
2	Giarnni Regini-Moran (ENG)	15.000	14.350	14.675	Q
3	Félix Dolci (CAN)	14.250	14.450	14.350	Q
4	James Bacueti (AUS)	14.600	14.000	14.300	Q
5	Emil Barber (WAL)	14.150	14.200	14.175	Q
6	Ewan McAteer (NIR)	14.150	13.750	13.950	Q
7	Muhammad Sharul Aimy (MAS)	14.000	13.900	13.950	Q
8	Samuel Dick (NZL)	13.850	13.150	13.500	Q
9	Satyajit Mondal (IND)	13.400	13.550	13.475	R1
10	Georgios Angonas (CYP)	13.800	13.050	13.425	R2
11	Joe Cemlyn-Jones (WAL)	13.150	13.650	13.400	R3
12	Ali Kader Haque (BAN)	13.700	13.050	13.375	
13	Terry Tay (SGP)	13.750	12.950	13.350	
14	Yogeshwar Singh (IND)	13.000	12.900	12.950	
15	David Weir (SCO)	12.950	12.550	12.750	
16	Abu Saeed Rafi (BAN)	11.950	12.450	12.200	
17	Shishir Ahmed (BAN)	11.950	11.350	11.650	
18	Muhammad Afzal (PAK)	10.550	10.200	10.375	

=== Parallel bars ===
The results are as follows:

Rank	Gymnast	Difficulty	Execution	Penalty	Total	Notes
1	Giarnni Regini-Moran (ENG)	6.100	8.750		14.850	Q
2	Joe Fraser (ENG)	6.500	8.100		14.600	Q
3	Mitchell Morgans (AUS)	6.100	8.400		14.500	Q
4	Brinn Bevan (WAL)	6.100	8.350		14.450	Q
5	Félix Dolci (CAN)	5.900	8.500		14.400	Q
6	Marios Georgiou (CYP)	5.800	8.550		14.350	Q
7	Ilias Georgiou (CYP)	5.600	8.700		14.300	Q
8	Tyson Bull (AUS)	5.400	8.650		14.050	Q
9	Saif Tamboli (IND)	5.800	8.250		14.050	R1
10	Jesse Moore (AUS)	5.500	8.400		13.900	–
11	Chris Kaji (CAN)	5.500	8.400		13.900	R2
12	Jake Jarman (ENG)	5.600	8.200		13.800	–
13	Pavel Karnejenko (SCO)	5.600	8.200		13.800	R3
14	Mikhail Koudinov (NZL)	5.800	7.950		13.750	
15	Hamish Carter (SCO)	5.000	8.600		13.600	
16	Daniel Lee (JEY)	5.100	8.500		13.600	
17	Clay Mason Stephens (AUS)	5.000	8.550		13.550	
18	Yogeshwar Singh (IND)	4.900	8.550		13.450	
19	James Hall (ENG)	5.700	7.750		13.450	
20	Frank Baines (SCO)	4.600	8.750		13.350	
21	Michael Reid (JAM)	5.500	7.850		13.350	
22	Joe Cemlyn-Jones (WAL)	4.900	8.400		13.300	
23	Kenji Tamane (CAN)	4.500	8.650		13.150	
24	Muhammad Khaalid Mia (RSA)	4.800	8.150		12.950	
25	Michalis Chari (CYP)	3.900	8.850		12.750	
26	Mathys Jalbert (CAN)	5.100	7.600		12.700	
27	Cameron Lynn (SCO)	4.700	7.950		12.650	
28	Jacob Edwards (WAL)	4.400	8.200		12.600	
29	Jorden O'Connell-Inns (NZL)	4.400	8.150		12.550	
30	Samuel Dick (NZL)	4.500	7.950		12.450	
31	Joshua Cook (WAL)	4.900	7.300		12.200	
32	Georgios Angonas (CYP)	4.900	7.150		12.050	
33	Ruchira Fernando (SRI)	3.500	7.750		11.250	
34	Igor Magalhães (CAY)	3.600	7.600		11.200	
35	Karthik Adapa (CAY)	3.500	7.650		11.150	
36	Ethan Dick (NZL)	5.100	6.050		11.150	
37	Shishir Ahmed (BAN)	2.400	7.100	-3.0	6.500	
38	Abu Saeed Rafi (BAN)	2.200	7.700	-4.0	5.900	
	Hansa Kumarasinghege (SRI)	DNS				

=== Horizontal bar ===
The results are as follows:

Rank	Gymnast	Difficulty	Execution	Penalty	Total	Notes
1	Joe Fraser (ENG)	5.800	8.700		14.500	Q
2	Jesse Moore (AUS)	5.200	8.950		14.150	Q
3	Ilias Georgiou (CYP)	5.300	8.850		14.150	Q
4	James Hall (ENG)	5.500	8.500		14.000	Q
5	Marios Georgiou (CYP)	5.500	8.400		13.900	Q
6	Mitchell Morgans (AUS)	5.500	8.350		13.850	Q
7	Hamish Carter (SCO)	4.600	8.900		13.500	Q
8	Clay Mason Stephens (AUS)	5.100	8.350		13.450	–
9	Jake Jarman (ENG)	4.600	8.800		13.400	–
10	Giarnni Regini-Moran (ENG)	5.100	8.250		13.350	–
11	Frank Baines (SCO)	4.500	8.750		13.250	Q
12	Georgios Angonas (CYP)	4.600	8.650		13.250	–
13	Tyson Bull (AUS)	5.600	7.650		13.250	–
14	Joshua Cook (WAL)	5.000	8.100		13.100	R1
15	Chris Kaji (CAN)	4.500	8.300		12.800	R2
16	Muhammad Khaalid Mia (RSA)	4.600	8.200		12.800	R3
17	Brinn Bevan (WAL)	4.800	8.000		12.800	
18	Félix Dolci (CAN)	5.300	7.500		12.800	
19	Yogeshwar Singh (IND)	4.500	8.200		12.700	
20	Ethan Dick (NZL)	4.200	8.400		12.600	
21	Pavel Karnejenko (SCO)	4.500	8.050		12.550	
22	Mathys Jalbert (CAN)	4.600	7.850		12.450	
23	Jacob Edwards (WAL)	4.100	8.100		12.200	
24	Samuel Dick (NZL)	3.400	8.750		12.150	
25	Daniel Lee (JEY)	4.400	7.650		12.050	
26	Kenji Tamane (CAN)	4.600	7.450		12.050	
27	Cameron Lynn (SCO)	4.800	7.250		12.050	
28	Mikhail Koudinov (NZL)	5.000	6.650		11.650	
29	Michalis Chari (CYP)	3.800	7.700		11.500	
30	Joe Cemlyn-Jones (WAL)	4.800	6.550		11.350	
31	Igor Magalhães (CAY)	3.200	8.050		11.250	
32	Ruchira Fernando (SRI)	3.000	7.700		10.700	
33	Jorden O'Connell-Inns (NZL)	3.600	7.000		10.600	
34	Karthik Adapa (CAY)	2.800	7.350		10.150	
35	Shishir Ahmed (BAN)	1.800	5.150	-4.0	2.950	
	Hansa Kumarasinghege (SRI)	DNS				
