= Gymnastics at the 2022 Commonwealth Games – Men's artistic individual all-around =

Gymnastics 2022 men's competition in Birmingham

Men's artistic individual all-around at the 2022 Commonwealth Games
- Venue: Arena Birmingham
- Dates: 29 July 2022 (qualification); 31 July 2022 (final)
- Competitors: 18 from 12 nations
- Winning score: 83.450

Medalists
| gold medal | Jake Jarman | England |
| silver medal | James Hall | England |
| bronze medal | Marios Georgiou | Cyprus |

The Men's artistic individual all-around gymnastics competition at the 2022 Commonwealth Games in Birmingham, England was held on 31 July 2022 at the Arena Birmingham.

== Schedule ==
The schedule was as follows:

All times are British Summer Time (UTC+1)

| Date | Time | Round |
|---|---|---|
| Friday 29 July 2022 | | Qualification |
| Sunday 31 July 2022 | | Final |

== Results ==
=== Qualification ===
Qualification for this all-around final was determined in parallel with the team final. The results are as follows:

| Rank | Country | Floor (gymnastics) | Pommel horse | Rings (gymnastics) | Vault (gymnastics) | Parallel bars | Horizontal bar | Total | Notes |
|---|---|---|---|---|---|---|---|---|---|
| 1 | James Hall (ENG) | 13.250 | 13.800 | 13.700 | 14.350 | 13.450 | 14.000 | 82.550 | Q |
| 2 | Jake Jarman (ENG) | 13.750 | 13.100 | 13.250 | 14.750 | 13.800 | 13.400 | 82.050 | Q |
| 3 | Marios Georgiou (CYP) | 12.700 | 13.850 | 12.950 | 14.150 | 14.350 | 13.900 | 81.900 | Q |
| 4 | Jesse Moore (AUS) | 12.850 | 13.500 | 13.400 | 13.550 | 13.900 | 14.150 | 81.350 | Q |
| 5 | Félix Dolci (CAN) | 13.450 | 10.600 | 14.400 | 14.250 | 14.400 | 12.800 | 79.900 | Q |
| 6 | Frank Baines (SCO) | 13.300 | 12.650 | 13.200 | 14.150 | 13.350 | 13.250 | 79.900 | Q |
| 7 | Clay Mason Stephens (AUS) | 13.400 | 11.050 | 12.850 | 14.250 | 13.550 | 13.450 | 78.550 | Q |
| 8 | Kenji Tamane (CAN) | 12.650 | 13.300 | 13.750 | 13.600 | 13.150 | 12.050 | 78.500 | Q |
| 9 | Pavel Karnejenko (SCO) | 11.650 | 12.300 | 14.200 | 13.950 | 13.800 | 12.550 | 78.450 | Q |
| 10 | Hamish Carter (SCO) | 11.800 | 12.850 | 12.900 | 13.800 | 13.600 | 13.500 | 78.450 | – |
| 11 | Daniel Lee (JEY) | 12.850 | 11.900 | 13.300 | 14.350 | 13.600 | 12.050 | 78.050 | Q |
| 12 | Joe Cemlyn-Jones (WAL) | 13.400 | 12.750 | 13.100 | 13.150 | 13.300 | 11.350 | 77.050 | WD |
| 13 | Mikhail Koudinov (NZL) | 12.750 | 11.550 | 13.150 | 13.900 | 13.750 | 11.650 | 76.750 | WD |
| 14 | Ethan Dick (NZL) | 12.400 | 13.400 | 12.700 | 13.850 | 11.150 | 12.600 | 76.100 | Q |
| 15 | Joshua Cook (WAL) | 12.600 | 12.300 | 12.100 | 13.600 | 12.200 | 13.100 | 75.900 | Q |
| 16 | Jacob Edwards (WAL) | 13.200 | 11.850 | 12.950 | 13.050 | 12.600 | 12.200 | 75.850 | Q |
| 17 | Georgios Angonas (CYP) | 11.800 | 10.700 | 12.600 | 13.800 | 12.050 | 13.250 | 74.200 | Q |
| 18 | Yogeshwar Singh (IND) | 11.300 | 11.200 | 11.950 | 13.000 | 13.450 | 12.700 | 73.600 | Q |
| 19 | Muhammad Khaalid Mia (RSA) | 12.400 | 8.850 | 12.100 | 13.150 | 12.950 | 12.800 | 72.250 | Q |
| 20 | Ruchira Fernando (SRI) | 11.200 | 12.000 | 10.250 | 13.150 | 11.250 | 10.700 | 68.550 | Q |
| 21 | Igor Magalhães (CAY) | 10.200 | 9.250 | 10.900 | 12.800 | 11.200 | 11.250 | 65.600 | R1', Q |
| 22 | Karthik Adapa (CAY) | 10.600 | 9.100 | 10.000 | 11.600 | 11.150 | 10.150 | 62.600 | R2 |
| 23 | Shishir Ahmed (BAN) | 9.100 | 2.100 | 4.600 | 11.950 | 6.500 | 2.950 | 37.200 | R3 |
| | Joe Fraser (ENG) | DNS | 14.650 | 14.450 | DNS | 14.600 | 14.500 | DNF | |
| | Hansa Kumarasinghege (SRI) | DNS | 9.050 | 4.150 | 10.100 | DNS | DNS | DNF | |

=== Final ===
The results are as follows:

| Position | Gymnast | Floor (gymnastics) | Pommel horse | Rings (gymnastics) | Vault (gymnastics) | Parallel bars | Horizontal bar | Total |
|---|---|---|---|---|---|---|---|---|
| 1st place, gold medalist(s) | Jake Jarman (ENG) | 14.000 | 13.350 | 13.300 | 15.300 | 14.100 | 13.400 | 83.450 |
| 2nd place, silver medalist(s) | James Hall (ENG) | 13.450 | 14.250 | 13.300 | 13.800 | 14.500 | 13.600 | 82.900 |
| 3rd place, bronze medalist(s) | Marios Georgiou (CYP) | 13.050 | 13.900 | 13.350 | 13.650 | 14.250 | 13.550 | 81.750 |
| 4 | Félix Dolci (CAN) | 14.200 | 11.200 | 14.000 | 14.500 | 14.000 | 13.650 | 81.550 |
| 5 | Pavel Karnejenko (SCO) | 12.750 | 13.150 | 14.150 | 14.300 | 13.400 | 12.900 | 80.650 |
| 6 | Daniel Lee (JER) | 12.700 | 12.450 | 12.900 | 14.150 | 14.000 | 13.250 | 79.450 |
| 7 | Frank Baines (SCO) | 13.350 | 12.900 | 12.950 | 13.750 | 13.250 | 13.250 | 79.450 |
| 8 | Kenji Tamane (CAN) | 13.100 | 13.200 | 12.700 | 12.750 | 13.200 | 13.200 | 78.150 |
| 9 | Ethan Dick (NZL) | 11.450 | 13.850 | 12.550 | 13.450 | 13.800 | 12.400 | 77.500 |
| 10 | Jacob Edwards (WAL) | 13.350 | 12.850 | 12.800 | 13.600 | 12.100 | 12.200 | 76.900 |
| 11 | Clay Mason Stephens (AUS) | 12.300 | 11.400 | 12.200 | 14.100 | 13.450 | 13.350 | 76.800 |
| 12 | Josh Cook (WAL) | 13.100 | 11.800 | 13.000 | 13.800 | 12.200 | 12.000 | 75.900 |
| 13 | Georgios Angonas (CYP) | 12.250 | 12.550 | 11.850 | 13.750 | 12.550 | 12.950 | 75.900 |
| 14 | Muhammad Khaalid Mia (RSA) | 12.200 | 13.200 | 11.850 | 12.900 | 13.250 | 12.300 | 75.700 |
| 15 | Yogeshwar Singh (IND) | 11.500 | 12.900 | 12.350 | 13.200 | 12.050 | 12.700 | 74.700 |
| 16 | Ruchira Fernando (SRI) | 10.000 | 12.400 | 10.450 | 10.650 | 11.850 | 9.700 | 65.050 |
| 17 | Igor Magalhães (CAY) | 10.350 | 7.950 | 4.050 | 12.900 | 12.050 | 10.350 | 57.650 |
| DNF | Jesse Moore (AUS) | 11.800 | 13.650 | 10.600 | - | - | - | - |
