= Cyprus at the 2022 Commonwealth Games =

- Flag of Cyprus
- CGF code: CYP
- CGA: Cyprus Olympic Committee
- Website: olympic.org.cy (in Greek)

in Birmingham, England 28 July 2022 – 8 August 2022
- Competitors: 55 (37 men and 18 women) in 12 sports
- Flag bearers: Marios Georgiou; Zoi Konstantopoulou
- Medals Ranked 17th: Gold 2 Silver 3 Bronze 6 Total 11

Commonwealth Games appearances (overview)
- 1978; 1982; 1986; 1990; 1994; 1998; 2002; 2006; 2010; 2014; 2018; 2022; 2026; 2030

Cyprus competed at the 2022 Commonwealth Games at Birmingham, England from 28 July to 8 August 2022. It was Cyprus' 11th appearance at the Games.

Marios Georgiou and Zoi Konstantopoulou were the country's flagbearers during the opening ceremony.

== Medalists ==
Medal	Name	Sport	Event	Date
Gold	Georgios Balarjishvili	Judo	Men's -66kg	1 August
Gold	Ilias Georgiou	Gymnastics	Men's horizontal bar	2 August
Silver	Sokratis Pilakouris	Gymnastics	Men's rings	1 August
Silver	Anna Sokolova	Gymnastics	Women's rhythmic individual all-around	5 August
Silver	Anna Sokolova	Gymnastics	Women's hoop	6 August
Bronze	Georgios Angonas; Michalis Chari; Ilias Georgiou; Marios Georgiou; Sokratis Pilakouris	Gymnastics	Men's artistic team all-around	29 July
Bronze	Marios Georgiou	Gymnastics	Men's artistic individual all-around	31 July
Bronze	Marios Georgiou	Gymnastics	Men's parallel bars	2 August
Bronze	Marios Georgiou	Gymnastics	Men's horizontal bar	2 August
Bronze	Alexandros Poursanidis	Athletics	Men's hammer throw	6 August
Bronze	Anna Sokolova	Gymnastics	Women's ball	6 August

== Competitors ==
It is expected that Cyprus will send 46 competitors to the Games.

The following is the list of number of competitors participating at the Games per sport/discipline.

Sport	Men	Women	Total
Athletics	6	5	11
Badminton	0	2	2
Beach volleyball	2	2	4
Boxing	2	0	2
Cycling	3	1	4
Gymnastics	5	4	9
Judo	5	1	6
Swimming	5	1	6
Table tennis	5	1	6
Triathlon	1	1	2
Weightlifting	1	0	1
Wrestling	2	0	2
Total	37	18	55

== Athletics ==
Men
Track and road events

Athlete	Event	Heat		Final	
Athlete	Event	Result	Rank	Result	Rank
Milan Trajkovic	110 m hurdles	13.47	3 Q	13.49	6

Field events

Athlete	Event	Qualification		Final	
Athlete	Event	Distance	Rank	Distance	Rank
Nikandros Stylianou	Pole vault	—		5.25	4
Christos Tamanis	Pole vault	—		5.15	6
Christoforos Genethli	Discus throw	57.40	11 q	57.80	12
Apostolos Parellis	Discus throw	57.99	9 q	62.08	7
Alexandros Poursanidis	Hammer throw	—		73.97	3rd place, bronze medalist(s)

Women
Track and road events

Athlete	Event	Heat		Final	
Athlete	Event	Result	Rank	Result	Rank
Natalia Christofi	100 m hurdles	13.42	5	Did not advance	

Field events

Athlete	Event	Qualification		Final	
Athlete	Event	Distance	Rank	Distance	Rank
Despoina Charalambous	High jump	1.71	17	did not advance	
Filippa Fotopoulou	Long jump	6.59	4 q	6.47	8
Androniki Lada	Discus throw	—		53.04	9
Chrystalla Kyriakou	Hammer throw	62.09	7 q	60.97	11

== Badminton ==
Athlete	Event	Round of 64	Round of 32	Round of 16	Quarterfinal	Semifinal	Final / BM	
Athlete	Event	Opposition Score	Opposition Score	Opposition Score	Opposition Score	Opposition Score	Opposition Score	Rank
Eleni Christodoulou	Women's singles	Bye	Yeo (SGP); L (12–21, 8–21)	Did not advance				
Eva Kattirzi	Women's singles	Akoumba Ze (CMR); W (21–10, 21–11)	Nantuo (GHA); W (21–10, 21–8)	Kashyap (IND); L (2–21, 7–21)	Did not advance			
Eleni Christodoulou; Eva Kattirzi	Women's doubles	—	Laurens Jordaan & Scholtz (RSA); L (15–21, 14–21)	Did not advance				

== Beach volleyball ==
On 26 September 2021, Cyprus guaranteed qualification for both the men's and women's tournaments by winning the European Qualifiers. The FIVB later confirmed the women ultimately qualified directly via the World Rankings (for performances between 16 April 2018 and 31 March 2022).

Athletes	Event	Preliminary Round				Quarterfinals	Semifinals	Final / BM	Rank
Athletes	Event	Opposition Score	Opposition Score	Opposition Score	Rank	Opposition Score	Opposition Score	Opposition Score	Rank
Antonios Liotatis; Charalambos Zorbis	Men's	New Zealand; L 0-2	England; L 0-2	Tuvalu; W 2-0	3 q	Canada; L 0-2	Did not advance		
Zoi Konstantopoulou; Manolina Konstantinou	Women's	Trinidad and Tobago; W 2-0	Sri Lanka; W 2-0	Australia; L 0-2	2 Q	Vanuatu; L 0-2	Did not advance		

=== Men's tournament ===
Group C

Pos	Team	Pld	W	L	Pts	SW	SL	SR	SPW	SPL	SPR	Qualification
1	O'Dea – Fuller (NZL)	3	3	0	6	6	0	MAX	126	97	1.299	Quarterfinals
2	Bello – Bello (ENG)	3	2	1	5	4	2	2.000	119	93	1.280	Quarterfinals
3	Liotatis – Zorbis (CYP)	3	1	2	4	2	4	0.500	102	114	0.895	Ranking of third-placed teams
4	Malosa – Issac (TUV)	3	0	3	3	0	6	0.000	83	126	0.659	

Source: birmingham2022.com

Qualified for the Quarterfinals

30 July 2022; 19:00	O'Dea – Fuller (NZL)	2–0	Liotatis – Zorbis (CYP)	Smithfield
30 July 2022; 19:00	(21–18, 21–13); Report			Smithfield

1 August 2022; 14:30	Bello – Bello (ENG)	2–0	Liotatis – Zorbis (CYP)	Smithfield
1 August 2022; 14:30	(21–11, 21–18); Report			Smithfield

3 August 2022; 14:30	Liotatis – Zorbis (CYP)	2–0	Malosa – Issac (TUV)	Smithfield
3 August 2022; 14:30	(21–13, 21–17); Report			Smithfield

Quarterfinals

5 August 2022; 19:00	Dearing – Schachter (CAN)	2–0	Liotatis – Zorbis (CYP)	Smithfield
5 August 2022; 19:00	(21–9, 21–11); Report			Smithfield

=== Women's tournament ===
Group B

Pos	Team	Pld	W	L	Pts	SW	SL	SR	SPW	SPL	SPR	Qualification
1	Artacho – Clancy (AUS)	3	3	0	6	6	0	MAX	126	62	2.032	Quarterfinals
2	Konstantopoulou – Konstantinou (CYP)	3	2	1	5	4	2	2.000	111	84	1.321	Quarterfinals
3	Bandara – Weerasinghe (SRI)	3	1	2	4	2	4	0.500	40	84	0.476	Ranking of third-placed teams
4	Armstrong – Chase (TTO)	3	0	3	3	0	6	0.000	37	126	0.294	

Source: birmingham2022.com

Qualified for the Quarterfinals

31 July 2022; 19:00	Konstantopoulou – Konstantinou (CYP)	2–0	Armstrong – Chase (TTO)	Smithfield
31 July 2022; 19:00	(21–7, 21–17); Report			Smithfield

2 August 2022; 19:00	Konstantopoulou – Konstantinou (CYP)	2–0	Bandara – Weerasinghe (SRI)	Smithfield
2 August 2022; 19:00	(21–8, 21–10); Report			Smithfield

4 August 2022; 14:30	Artacho – Clancy (AUS)	2–0	Konstantopoulou – Konstantinou (CYP)	Smithfield
4 August 2022; 14:30	(21–14, 21–13); Report			Smithfield

Quarterfinals

5 August 2022; 15:30	Pata – Toko (VAN)	2–0	Konstantopoulou – Konstantinou (CYP)	Smithfield
5 August 2022; 15:30	(29–27, 30–28); Report			Smithfield

== Boxing ==
Men

Athlete	Event	Round of 32	Round of 16	Quarterfinals	Semifinals	Final	
Athlete	Event	Opposition Result	Opposition Result	Opposition Result	Opposition Result	Opposition Result	Rank
Rafail Pafios	Light middleweight	Mohlerepe (LES); L 0 - 5	did not advance				
Odysseas Atmatzidis	Middleweight	T-Hallett (COK); W 5 - 0	Mbundwike (TAN); L 2 - 3	did not advance			

== Cycling ==
=== Road ===
Men

Athlete	Event	Time	Rank
Alexandros Agrotis	Road race	3:37:08	24
Andreas Miltiadis	Road race	3:42:43	71
Andreas Miltiadis	Time trial	49:50.49	10

Women

Athlete	Event	Time	Rank
Antri Christoforou	Road race	2:44:46	9
Antri Christoforou	Time trial	45:08.55	21

=== Mountain Biking ===
Athlete	Event	Time	Rank
Christos Philokyprou	Men’s cross-country	did not finish	

== Gymnastics ==
=== Artistic ===
Men
Team Final & Individual Qualification

Athlete	Event	Apparatus						Total	Rank
Athlete	Event	F	PH	R	V	PB	HB	Total	Rank
Georgios Angonas	Team	11.800	~~10.700~~	~~12.600~~	13.800	~~12.050~~	13.250	74.200	17 Q
Michalis Chari	Team	11.050	11.200	—	13.700	12.750	~~11.500~~	—	
Ilias Georgiou	Team	—	12.850	13.350 Q	—	14.300 Q	14.150 Q	—	
Marios Georgiou	Team	12.700	13.850 Q	12.950	14.150	14.350 Q	13.900 Q	81.900	3 Q
Sokratis Pilakouris	Team	12.200	—	14.400 Q	~~DNS~~	—			
Total	Team	36.700	37.900	40.700	41.650	41.400	41.300	239.650	3rd place, bronze medalist(s)

Individual Finals

Athlete	Event	Apparatus						Total	Rank
Athlete	Event	F	PH	R	V	PB	HB	Total	Rank
Georgios Angonas	All-around	12.250	12.550	11.850	13.750	12.550	12.950	75.900	13
Ilias Georgiou	Rings	—		WD	—			Withdrew	
Ilias Georgiou	Parallel bars	—				13.600	—	13.600	6
Ilias Georgiou	Horizontal bar	—					14.466	14.466	1st place, gold medalist(s)
Marios Georgiou	All-around	13.050	13.900	13.350	13.650	14.250	13.550	81.750	3rd place, bronze medalist(s)
Marios Georgiou	Pommel horse	—	13.166	—				13.166	7
Marios Georgiou	Parallel bars	—				14.533	—	14.533	3rd place, bronze medalist(s)
Marios Georgiou	Horizontal bar	—					14.133	14.133	3rd place, bronze medalist(s)
Sokratis Pilakouris	Rings	—		14.300	—			14.300	2nd place, silver medalist(s)

Women
Individual Qualification

Athlete	Event	Apparatus				Total	Rank
Athlete	Event	V	UB	BB	F	Total	Rank
Tatiana Bachurina	Qualification	11.550	11.600	10.100	10.600	43.850	22 Q

Individual Finals

Athlete	Event	Apparatus				Total	Rank
Athlete	Event	V	UB	BB	F	Total	Rank
Tatiana Bachurina	All-around	11.750	10.900	11.200	10.750	44.600	16

=== Rhythmic ===
Team Final & Individual Qualification

Athlete	Event	Apparatus				Total	Rank
Athlete	Event	Hoop	Ball	Clubs	Ribbon	Total	Rank
Neofyta Mavrikiou	Team	~~23.650~~	23.850	23.700	~~20.100~~	91.300	21
Anastasia Pingou	Team	24.850	25.900	24.050	25.300	100.100	19 Q
Anna Sokolova	Team	28.800 Q	27.850 Q	28.200 Q	28.100 Q	112.950	1 Q
Total	Team	53.650	77.600	75.950	53.400	260.600	5

Individual Finals

Athlete	Event	Apparatus				Total	Rank
Athlete	Event	Hoop	Ball	Clubs	Ribbon	Total	Rank
Anastasia Pingou	All-around	24.400	24.500	24.400	22.900	96.200	15
Anna Sokolova	All-around	28.700	27.800	28.000	27.600	112.100	2nd place, silver medalist(s)
Anna Sokolova	Hoop	28.300	—			28.300	2nd place, silver medalist(s)
Anna Sokolova	Ball	—	28.800	—		28.800	3rd place, bronze medalist(s)
Anna Sokolova	Clubs	—		27.300	—	27.300	7
Anna Sokolova	Ribbon	—			24.600	24.600	8

== Judo ==
Cyprus entered six judoka (five men and one woman). Georgios Balarjishvili won Cyprus' first ever Commonwealth Games gold medal in the sport of judo.

Men

Athlete	Event	Round of 32	Round of 16	Quarterfinals	Semifinals	Repechage	Final/BM	
Athlete	Event	Opposition Result	Opposition Result	Opposition Result	Opposition Result	Opposition Result	Opposition Result	Rank
Petros Christodoulides	-60 kg	Williams (SLE); W 10 - 00	Tsala Tsala (CMR); W 10 - 01	Zulu (ZAM); W 01 - 00	Hall (ENG); L 00 - 10	—	Yadav (IND); L 00 - 10	5
Georgios Balarjishvili	-66 kg	—	Nash (NIR); W 10 - 00	Katz (AUS); W 01 - 00	Short (SCO); W 01 - 00	—	Allan (SCO); W 01 - 00	1st place, gold medalist(s)
Dato Matsoukatov	-73 kg	—	Mahit (VAN); W 10 - 00	Green (NIR); W 10 - 00	Njie (GAM); L PEN	—	Majeed (MAS); L 00 - 10	5
Odysseas Georgakis	-81 kg	—	Fleming (NIR); L 00 - 01	did not advance				9
Giannis Antoniou	+100 kg	—	Takayawa (FIJ); W 10 - 00	Deschenes (CAN); L 00 - 10	Did not advance	McWatt (SCO); L 00 - 10	Did not advance	7

Women

Athlete	Event	Round of 16	Quarterfinals	Semifinals	Repechage	Final/BM	
Athlete	Event	Opposition Result	Opposition Result	Opposition Result	Opposition Result	Opposition Result	Rank
Sofia Asvesta	-52 kg	Renicks (SCO); W 10 - 00	Eastonn (AUS); L 00 - 10	Did not advance	Griesel (RSA); L 00 - 01	Did not advance	7

== Swimming ==
Men

Athlete	Event	Heat		Semifinal		Final	
Athlete	Event	Time	Rank	Time	Rank	Time	Rank
Christos Manoli	50 m freestyle	24.87	47	did not advance			
Markos Iakovidis	50 m freestyle	23.72	26	did not advance			
Christos Manoli	100 m freestyle	53.18	43	did not advance			
Christos Manoli	200 m freestyle	1:56.16	27	—		did not advance	
Filippos Iakovidis	50 m backstroke	26.15	21	did not advance			
Sofoklis Mougis	50 m backstroke	26.40	23	did not advance			
Sofoklis Mougis	100 m backstroke	58.09	23	did not advance			
Markos Iakovidis	50 m breaststroke	28.78	21	did not advance			
Panayiotis Panaretos	50 m breaststroke	28.46	17	did not advance			
Panayiotis Panaretos	100 m breaststroke	1:02.83	16 Q	1:02.76	16	did not advance	

Women

Athlete	Event	Heat		Semifinal		Final	
Athlete	Event	Time	Rank	Time	Rank	Time	Rank
Anna Hadjiloizou	50 m freestyle	25.44	9 Q	25.56	10 Q	did not advance	
Anna Hadjiloizou	100 m freestyle	56.48	16 Q	56.92	16	did not advance	

== Table tennis ==
Cyprus accepted a Bipartite Invitation for the para table tennis competition and selected Pantelis Kailis to compete.

Singles

Athletes	Event	Group stage				Round of 32	Round of 16	Quarterfinal	Semifinal	Final / BM	
Athletes	Event	Opposition Score	Opposition Score	Opposition Score	Rank	Opposition Score	Opposition Score	Opposition Score	Opposition Score	Opposition Score	Rank
Charbel Elias	Men's singles	Crea (SEY); W 4 - 0	Evan (WAL); L 0 - 4	—	2	did not advance					
Marios Yiangou	Men's singles	Jones (RSA); W 4 - 0	Chen (CAN); L 2 - 4	—	2	did not advance					
Iosif Elia	Men's singles	McCreery (NIR); L 1 - 4	Sultan (SEY); W 4 - 3	—	2	did not advance					
Panteleimon Kailis	Men's singles C8–10	Agunbiade (NGR); L 0 - 3	Chee (MAS); L 0 - 3	Stacey (WAL); L 0 - 3	4	—			did not advance		
Foteini Meletie	Women's singles	Chung (TTO); W 4 - 3	Bardsley (ENG); L 1 - 4	—	2	did not advance					

Doubles

Athletes	Event	Round of 64	Round of 32	Round of 16	Quarterfinal	Semifinal	Final / BM	
Athletes	Event	Opposition Score	Opposition Score	Opposition Score	Opposition Score	Opposition Score	Opposition Score	Rank
Christos Savva; Iosif Elia	Men's doubles	Bye	Desai / Shetty (IND); L 0 - 3	Did not advance				
Marios Yiangou; Charbel Elias	Men's doubles	Bye	Abiodun / Aruna (NGR); L 0 - 3	Did not advance				
Marios Yiangou; Foteini Meletie	Mixed doubles	Wykes / Silcock (JEY); L 1 - 3	Did not advance					

Team

Athletes	Event	Group stage				Quarterfinal	Semifinal	Final / BM	
Athletes	Event	Opposition Score	Opposition Score	Opposition Score	Rank	Opposition Score	Opposition Score	Opposition Score	Rank
Charpel Elias; Iosif Elia; Christos Savva; Marios Yiangou	Men's team	Ghana; W 3 - 1	South Africa; W 3 - 1	Nigeria; L 0 - 3	2 Q	England; L 0 - 3	did not advance		

== Triathlon ==
Individual

Athlete	Event	Swim (750 m)	Trans 1	Bike (20 km)	Trans 2	Run (5 km)	Total	Rank
Panayiotis Antoniou	Men's	9:57	1:01	29:13	0:22	17:53	58:26	28
Stavri Pericleous	Women's	11:02	1:36	37:55	0:40	19:23	1:10:36	29

== Weightlifting ==
Athlete	Event	Weight Lifted		Total	Rank
Athlete	Event	Snatch	Clean & jerk	Total	Rank
Antonis Martasidis	Men's -96 kg	150	NM	DNF	

== Wrestling ==
Key:

- VT - Victory by Fall.
- PP - Decision by Points - the loser with technical points.
- PO - Decision by Points - the loser without technical points.

Athlete	Event	Round of 16	Quarterfinal	Semifinal	Repechage	Final / BM	
Athlete	Event	Opposition Result	Opposition Result	Opposition Result	Opposition Result	Opposition Result	Rank
Charalampos Choiras	Men's -86 kg	Eslami (ENG); L 4 - 6	did not advance				10
Alexios Kaouslidis	Men's -125 kg	Bye	Grewal (IND); L 1 - 10	did not advance			8

== See also ==
- Cyprus at the 2022 Winter Olympics
