= Gymnastics at the 2022 Commonwealth Games – Women's rhythmic individual hoop =

Women's rhythmic individual hoop at the 2022 Commonwealth Games
- Venue: Arena Birmingham
- Dates: 6 August 2022
- Competitors: 8 from 6 nations
- Winning score: 28.700

Medalists
gold medal	Gemma Frizelle	Wales
silver medal	Anna Sokolova	Cyprus
bronze medal	Carmel Kallemaa	Canada

The Women's rhythmic individual hoop gymnastics competition at the 2022 Commonwealth Games in Birmingham, England was held on 6 August 2022 at the Arena Birmingham.

== Schedule ==
The schedule was as follows:

All times are British Summer Time (UTC+1)

Date	Time	Round
Thursday 4 August 2022	12:00	Qualification
Saturday 6 August 2022	10:00	Final

== Results ==
=== Qualification ===
Qualification for this apparatus final was determined within the team final.

=== Final ===
The results are as follows:

Rank	Gymnast	Difficulty	Execution	Penalty	Total
1st place, gold medalist(s)	Gemma Frizelle (WAL)	13.000	8.100		28.700
2nd place, silver medalist(s)	Anna Sokolova (CYP)	12.600	7.800		28.300
3rd place, bronze medalist(s)	Carmel Kallemaa (CAN)	12.000	7.900		28.200
4	Marfa Ekimova (ENG)	11.600	8.000	–0.05	27.750
5	Tatiana Cocsanova (CAN)	12.100	7.200		27.100
6	Lidiia Iakovleva (AUS)	11.300	7.100		26.000
7	Izzah Amzan (MAS)	12.000	6.900	–0.30	25.800
8	Alice Leaper (ENG)	10.600	7.600		25.700
