= Athletics at the 2022 Commonwealth Games – Men's 110 metres hurdles =

Men's 110 metres hurdles at the 2022 Commonwealth Games
- Venue: Alexander Stadium
- Dates: 2 August (first round); 4 August (final)
- Competitors: 13 from 9 nations
- Winning time: 13.08

Medalists
gold medal	Rasheed Broadbell	Jamaica
silver medal	Shane Brathwaite	Barbados
bronze medal	Andrew Pozzi	England

The men's 110 metres hurdles at the 2022 Commonwealth Games, as part of the athletics programme, took place in the Alexander Stadium on 2 and 4 August 2022.

== Records ==
Prior to this competition, the existing world and Games records were as follows:

World record	Aries Merritt (USA)	12.80	Brussels, Belgium	7 September 2012
Commonwealth record	Omar McLeod (JAM)	12.90	Kingston, Jamaica	24 June 2017
Games record	Colin Jackson (WAL)	13.08	Auckland, New Zealand	28 January 1990
Games record	Colin Jackson (WAL)	13.08	Victoria, Canada	23 August 1994

== Schedule ==
The schedule was as follows:

Date	Time	Round
Tuesday 2 August 2022	20:05	First round
Thursday 4 August 2022	21:44	Final

All times are British Summer Time (UTC+1)

== Results ==
=== First round ===
The first round consisted of two heats. The three fastest competitors per heat (plus two fastest non-automatic qualifiers) advanced to the final.

Rank	Heat	Lane	Name	Result	Notes
1	2	2	Rasheed Broadbell (JAM)	13.16	Q, SB
2	1	3	Hansle Parchment (JAM)	13.33	Q
3	2	4	Joshua Zeller (ENG)	13.35	Q
4	1	7	Orlando Bennett (JAM)	13.40	Q
5	1	6	Andrew Pozzi (ENG)	13.41	Q
6	1	2	Shane Brathwaite (BAR)	13.42	q
7	2	7	Milan Trajkovic (CYP)	13.47	Q
8	1	8	Nicholas Hough (AUS)	13.62	q
9	2	3	Tade Ojora (ENG)	13.76(.751)	
10	2	6	Rasheem Brown (CAY)	13.76(.760)	
11	1	5	Jérémie Lararaudeuse (MRI)	13.88	
12	1	4	Kolone Alefosio (SAM)	14.78	PB
	2	5	Jahmaal Wilson (BAH)	DQ	TR 22.6.2

=== Final ===
The medals were determined in the final.

Rank	Lane	Name	Result	Notes
1st place, gold medalist(s)	6	Rasheed Broadbell (JAM)	13.08	=GR, PB
2nd place, silver medalist(s)	1	Shane Brathwaite (BAR)	13.30	SB
3rd place, bronze medalist(s)	8	Andrew Pozzi (ENG)	13.37	
4	4	Joshua Zeller (ENG)	13.39	
5	5	Orlando Bennett (JAM)	13.43	
6	7	Milan Trajkovic (CYP)	13.49	
7	2	Nicholas Hough (AUS)	13.83	
	3	Hansle Parchment (JAM)	DNS	
