= Oceania Artistic Gymnastics Championships =

Artistic Gymnastics Championship

The Oceania Artistic Gymnastics Championship is an annual artistic gymnastics competition. It is governed by the Oceania Gymnastics Union.

== Summary of championships ==
Year	Host City	Host Country	Date	Men's Team Champion	Women's Team Champion	Men's All-Around Champion	Women's All-Around Champion
2020	Tauranga	New Zealand	April 16–18, 2020	Canceled due to the COVID-19 pandemic			
2021	Gold Coast	Australia	May 21, 2021	—N/a		(New Zealand) Mikhail Koudinov	(Australia) Emily Whitehead
2022	Carrara	Australia	May 22–25, 2022	Australia	Australia	(Australia) Jesse Moore	(Australia) Emily Whitehead
2023	Carrara	Australia	May 6, 2023	Australia	Australia	(New Zealand) Mikhail Koudinov	(Australia) Ruby Pass
2024	Auckland	New Zealand	May 25–26, 2024	—N/a		(Australia) Jesse Moore	(Australia) Emma Nedov
2026	Brisbane	Australia	May 8–9, 2026	Australia	Australia	(Australia) Jesse Moore	(Australia) Emily Whitehead
