= Tyson Bull =

Australian artistic gymnast (born 1993)

- Full name: Tyson Leigh Bull
- Nickname: Tys
- Born: 21 May 1993 (age 33) Wantirna, Victoria, Australia
- Height: 173 cm (5 ft 8 in)

Gymnastics career
- Discipline: Men's artistic gymnastics
- Country represented: Australia
- College team: Illinois Fighting Illini (2014–2018)
- Club: Knox Gymnastics Club
- Retired: 2025
Medal record
Representing Australia
Commonwealth Games
Silver medal – second place	2022 Birmingham	Horizontal bar
FIG World Cup
Event	1st	2nd	3rd
World Challenge Cup	1	0	0
Total	1	0	0

Tyson Leigh Bull (born 21 May 1993) is an Australian retired artistic gymnast. He is the 2022 Commonwealth Games horizontal bar silver medalist. He competed at the 2020 Summer Olympics and became the first Australian male artistic gymnast to advance to an Olympic final.

== Early life ==
Bull was born on 21 May 1993 in Wantirna to parents Richard and Christine. He has two older brothers, Mitchell and Jayden. He was inspired to start gymnastics by Jayden when he was five years old.

== Gymnastics career ==
Bull made his international debut at the 2010 Pacific Rim Championships with the Australian team that placed fourth. Individually, he won a silver medal on the horizontal bar behind John Orozco. He won the silver medal in the still rings at the 2011 Commonwealth Youth Games held on the Isle of Man, and he won a bronze medal in the team event. At the 2011 Japan Junior International, he placed sixth on the parallel bars and fourth on the horizontal bar.

Bull left Australia in 2014 to begin competing for the Illinois Fighting Illini men's gymnastics team. During his freshman season, he competed on five different apparatuses throughout the year, helping the Illini finish second at the Big Ten Championships. At the 2015 Australian Championships, he placed ninth in the all-around and won the national titles on the pommel horse and horizontal bar. He then competed at the 2015 World University Games with the Australian team that placed 15th.

Bull placed sixth on the horizontal bar at the 2016 NCAA Championships and earned All-American status. He placed third on the horizontal bar at the 2017 Big Ten Championships. He then won the horizontal bar title at the 2017 Australian Championships. He competed on the horizontal bar for Australia at the 2017 World Championships, finishing 23rd.

During his senior season at Illinois, Bull won the horizontal bar at five meets. At the 2018 Australian Championships, he won a bronze medal on the pommel horse and also placed fifth on the parallel bars and fourth on the horizontal bar. He competed on the horizontal bar at the 2018 World Championships held in Doha, Qatar, and was the third reserve for the final after finishing 11th in qualifications.

Bull qualified to represent Australia at the 2020 Summer Olympics in Tokyo, Japan, after finishing in seventh place in the horizontal bar event at the 2019 World Championships held in Stuttgart, Germany. At the Olympics, he advanced to the horizontal bar final in seventh place, becoming the first Australian male artistic gymnast to advance into an Olympic final. He went on to finish fifth in the final.

Bull won the horizontal bar title at the 2022 Koper World Challenge Cup. He then represented Australia at the 2022 Commonwealth Games despite competing on an injured ankle and helped the team place fourth, only 0.650 away from a medal. He initially did not advance to the horizontal bar final due to a mistake in the qualifications, but when teammate Clay Stephens withdrew, he was given the chance to compete. He won the silver medal behind Cypriot Ilias Georgiou. He finished eighth in the horizontal bar final at the 2022 World Championships.

Bull announced his retirement from the sport in 2025.

== Personal life ==
In 2023, Bull graduated with a master's degree in physiotherapy from the Swinburne University of Technology. He spent ten weeks training at the Cirque du Soleil headquarters in Montreal.
