= Chris Kaji =

Canadian artistic gymnast

- Born: 31 January 2000 (age 26)
- Height: 155 cm (5 ft 1 in)

Gymnastics career
- Discipline: Men's artistic gymnastics
- Country represented: Canada
Medal record
Representing Canada
Commonwealth Games
Silver medal – second place	2022 Birmingham	Team
Bronze medal – third place	2022 Birmingham	Rings
Pan American Championships
Bronze medal – third place	2022 Rio de Janeiro	Team
Pacific Rim Championships
Silver medal – second place	2018 Medellín	Team
Silver medal – second place	2024 Cali	Team
Bronze medal – third place	2018 Medellín	Rings
Bronze medal – third place	2024 Cali	Rings

Chris Kaji (born 31 January 2000) is a Canadian artistic gymnast.

In 2018, he won the bronze medal in the men's rings event at the Pacific Rim Gymnastics Championships held in Medellín, Colombia.
