= Joe Fraser =

British artistic gymnast

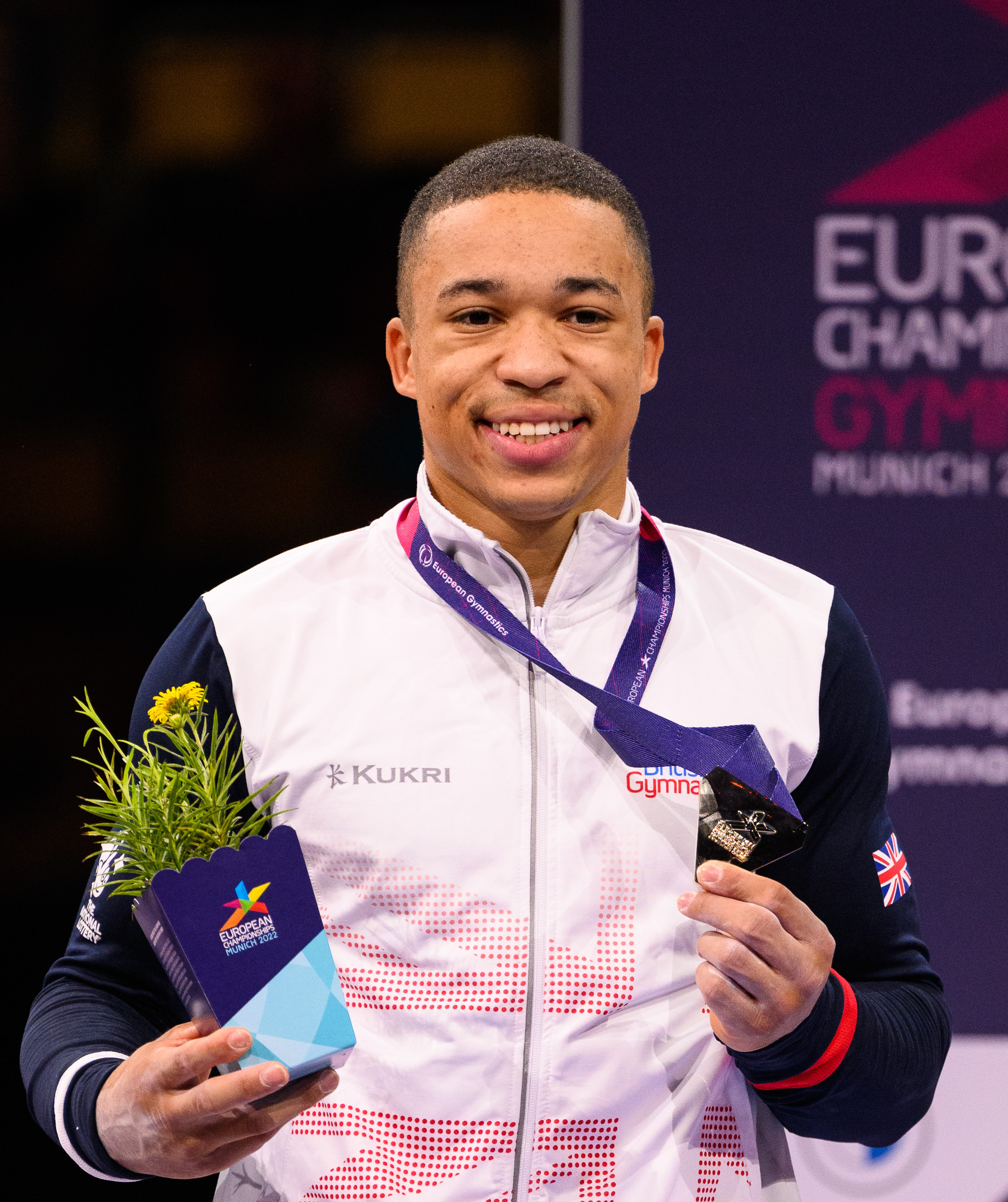
- Fraser at the 2022 European Championships

Personal information
- Full name: Joe Connor Fraser
- Born: 6 December 1998 (age 27) Birmingham, England
- Height: 1.68 m (5 ft 6 in)

Gymnastics career
- Discipline: Men's artistic gymnastics
- Country represented: (United Kingdom) Great Britain England; (2014–present)
- Club: City of Birmingham GC
- Head coach: Lee Woolls
Medal record
Men's artistic gymnastics
Representing Great Britain
World Championships
Gold medal – first place	2019 Stuttgart	Parallel Bars
Bronze medal – third place	2022 Liverpool	Team
Bronze medal – third place	2025 Jakarta	Horizontal Bar
Bronze medal – third place	2026 Rotterdam	All-Around
European Championships
Gold medal – first place	2022 Munich	Team
Gold medal – first place	2022 Munich	All-Around
Gold medal – first place	2022 Munich	Parallel Bars
Gold medal – first place	2026 Zagreb	Team
Gold medal – first place	2026 Zagreb	Horizontal Bar
Silver medal – second place	2018 Glasgow	Team
Silver medal – second place	2024 Rimini	Team
Bronze medal – third place	2021 Basel	Pommel Horse
Bronze medal – third place	2026 Zagreb	Parallel Bars
FIG World Cup
Event	1st	2nd	3rd
Apparatus World Cup	1	1	1
World Challenge Cup	1	0	1
Total	2	1	2
Representing England
Commonwealth Games
Gold medal – first place	2022 Birmingham	Team
Gold medal – first place	2022 Birmingham	Pommel Horse
Gold medal – first place	2022 Birmingham	Parallel Bars

Joe Connor Fraser (born 6 December 1998) is an English artistic gymnast and member of the British national team. As the 2019 world champion on the parallel bars and 2022 European all-around and parallel bars champion, he became the first British gymnast to win gold in these events, the first black male to win a world championships gold medal in gymnastics, and the third British world champion (following Beth Tweddle and Max Whitlock). Fraser also became the first British gymnast to win a World Championship medal on the horizontal bar, taking bronze at the 2025 World Championships, before becoming the European champion on the same apparatus in 2026.

Fraser has also won team gold, silver, and bronze on the pommel horse at the European Championships, and was a member of the 2021 and 2024 Olympic teams.

Representing England at the 2022 Commonwealth Games, Fraser won three gold medals in the team, pommel horse and parallel bars events.

== Early life and education ==
Fraser was born on 6 December 1998 with six fingers on each hand; he had the additional digits removed as a baby. At age five, Fraser enjoyed doing flips at home; his mother, concerned about injury, sent him to a gymnastics centre to learn how to do the skills properly.

He studied at Sandwell Academy from 2010 to 2015.

== Gymnastics career ==
=== 2017 ===
Fraser made his international senior debut in April at the 2017 European Championships in Cluj-Napoca, Romania, where he placed fifth in the all-around.

In July, he won the All-Around title at the 2017 British Championships. He also won a gold medal on the high bar, a silver medal on still rings, and a bronze medal on parallel bars.

Fraser also competed at the 2017 World Championships in Quebec, Canada.

=== 2018 ===
Early in the year, Fraser fell from the horizontal bar and damaged ligaments in his ankles, making him unable to compete in the 2018 Commonwealth Games in the Gold Coast, Australia. He returned to international competition at the 2018 World Challenge Cup in Guimares, Portugal where he made the pommel horse, still rings and parallel bars finals.

At the 2018 European Championships in Glasgow, Fraser won a silver as part of the team. He also made the parallel bar and horizontal bar finals.

Fraser also competed at the 2018 World Championships in Doha, Qatar, where the team placed fifth.

=== 2019 ===
In March 2019, Fraser won a silver medal on the high bar and a bronze medal on parallel bars at the British Championships. At the 2019 European Championships in Szczecin, Poland, Fraser narrowly missed out on a bronze medal by 0.033 marks in the all-around final.

In October, Fraser won gold at the 2019 World Championships in Stuttgart for his performance on the parallel bars with a score of 15.000. He was the youngest competitor on the apparatus and his win was Great Britain's first gold medal on the apparatus.

=== 2021 ===
At the 2021 European Championships Fraser took bronze on the pommel horse.

At the 2020 Summer Olympics in Tokyo, Fraser competed for Great Britain. The team, consisting of Max Whitlock, James Hall, Giarnni Regini-Moran and Fraser, took fourth place with a score of 255.76. Fraser qualified for the individual all-around final, where he came 9th, and the parallel bar final, where he came 8th in his debut games.

=== 2022 ===
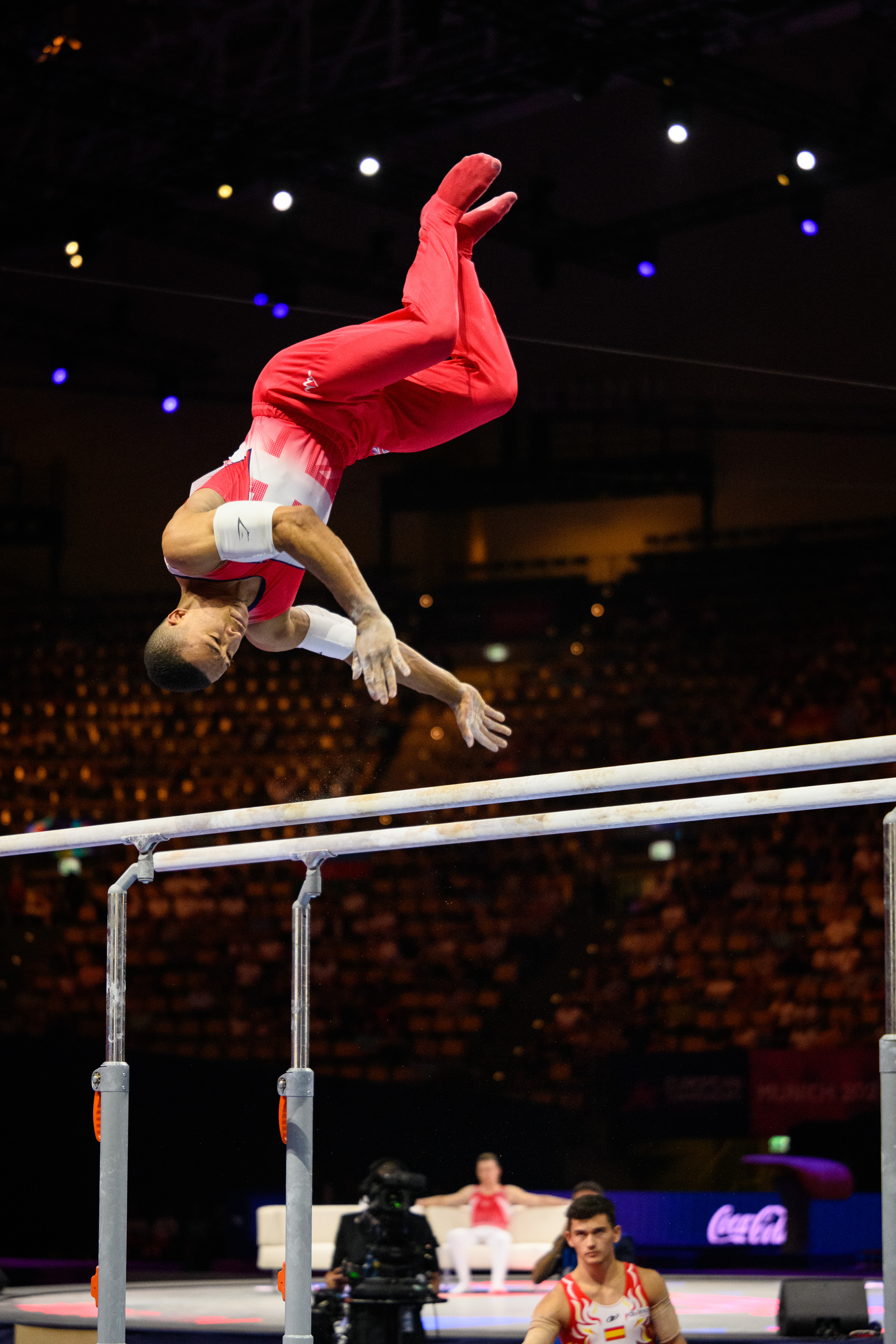
Fraser competing on parallel bars at the 2022 European Championships

At the British Championships, Fraser won the all-around, floor exercise, pommel horse, and horizontal bar titles. Fraser competed at the Baku World Cup where he advanced to the parallel bars and horizontal bar finals. During the parallel bars final, he won the bronze medal behind Illia Kovtun from Ukraine and Ferhat Arican from Turkey. The next day he won gold on the horizontal bar.

Despite fracturing his foot two weeks before the Commonwealth Games, Fraser was able to compete on four apparatus and contribute to the England team's successful defence of their Commonwealth title. Fraser also went on to take gold in both the pommel horse and parallel bars. In the former, he beat 2018 champion Rhys McClenaghan while in the latter, he beat compatriot Giarnni Regini-Moran.

At the 2022 European Championships, Fraser helped Great Britain win the gold in the Team competition. Additionally, he won gold in the all-around ahead of Adem Asil and Ahmet Önder, becoming the first British man to win a European all-around title. Fraser qualified for the pommel horse and parallel bars finals, winning gold on the parallel bars.

At the 2022 World Championships, Fraser helped Great Britain take bronze in the Team competition and also qualified for the all-around final in fourth place. The bronze was Great Britain's second World team medal, having won silver in Glasgow in 2015.

=== 2024 ===
At the 2024 European Championships, Fraser helped Great Britain finish second as a team behind Ukraine. In June of that year he was selected to represent Great Britain at the 2024 Summer Olympics alongside Jake Jarman, Harry Hepworth, Luke Whitehouse, and Max Whitlock. The team placed fourth in the team competition.

=== 2025 ===
Fraser competed at the 2025 Paris World Challenge Cup where he qualified for the rings, parallel bars, and horizontal bar finals. He won gold on parallel bars and bronze on rings. In late September he was selected to represent Great Britain at the 2025 World Championships. He became the first British gymnast to win a medal on the horizontal bar, taking bronze. His score of 14.700 saw him finish behind American Brody Malone, who won gold, and Japan's Daiki Hashimoto.

=== 2026 ===
Fraser competed at the 2026 European Championships alongside Courtney Tulloch, Harry Hepworth, Sol Scott, and Jonas Rushworth. On the first day of competition, Fraser finished seventh in the all-around after suffering mishaps on floor exercise. During event finals, he won bronze on parallel bars and won gold on horizontal bar. On the final day of the competition, Fraser helped Great Britain defend their European team title.

Fraser was selected to represent Great Britain at the 2026 World Championships alongside Jake Jarman, Tulloch, Reuben Ward, Hepworth, and alternate Rushworth.

== Personal life ==
When he retires, Fraser intends to become a gymnastics coach. He opened his own gymnastics club, Joe Fraser Gymnastics, in Lichfield in 2025.

== Competitive history ==
Competitive history of Joe Fraser
Year	Event	Team	AA	FX	PH	SR	VT	PB	HB
2017
2017	European Championships		5						
2017	British Championships		1st place, gold medalist(s)		2nd place, silver medalist(s)		3rd place, bronze medalist(s)	1st place, gold medalist(s)	
2018	Guimares World Challenge Cup				8	8		5	
2018	European Championships	2nd place, silver medalist(s)						8	6
2018	World Championships	5							
2019	British Championships							3rd place, bronze medalist(s)	2nd place, silver medalist(s)
2019	European Championships		4						
2019	World Championships	5	8					1st place, gold medalist(s)	
2021	European Championships				3rd place, bronze medalist(s)				
2021	Olympic Games	4	9					8	
2022	British Championships		1st place, gold medalist(s)	1st place, gold medalist(s)	1st place, gold medalist(s)			2nd place, silver medalist(s)	1st place, gold medalist(s)
2022	Baku World Cup							3rd place, bronze medalist(s)	1st place, gold medalist(s)
2022	Commonwealth Games	1st place, gold medalist(s)			1st place, gold medalist(s)			1st place, gold medalist(s)	
2022	European Championships	1st place, gold medalist(s)	1st place, gold medalist(s)		8			1st place, gold medalist(s)	
2022	World Championships	3rd place, bronze medalist(s)	22					8	
2024	British Championships		1st place, gold medalist(s)	2nd place, silver medalist(s)	3rd place, bronze medalist(s)				
2024	Cairo World Cup				7				2nd place, silver medalist(s)
2024	European Championships	2nd place, silver medalist(s)							
2024	Olympic Games	4	5						
2025	Paris World Challenge Cup					3rd place, bronze medalist(s)		1st place, gold medalist(s)	7
2025	World Championships								3rd place, bronze medalist(s)
2025	Arthur Gander Memorial		1st place, gold medalist(s)						
2026	English Championships		4	9	6	3rd place, bronze medalist(s)			9
2026	British Championships		1st place, gold medalist(s)		4	3rd place, bronze medalist(s)		1st place, gold medalist(s)	1st place, gold medalist(s)
2026	Osijek World Cup							4	4
2026	European Championships	1st place, gold medalist(s)	7					3rd place, bronze medalist(s)	1st place, gold medalist(s)
2026	World Championships	4	3rd place, bronze medalist(s)						
