= Anna Sokolova =

Cypriot rhythmic gymnast (born 2004)

- Born: 3 May 2004 (age 22) Saint Petersburg, Russia

Gymnastics career
- Discipline: Rhythmic gymnastics
- Country represented: Cyprus; (2018-)
- Club: Andreas Tricomitis
- Head coaches: Loukia Trikomiti, Chrystalleni Trikomiti
- Assistant coaches: Anna Chuvaeva, Olga Chaynikova
Medal record
Rhythmic gymnastics
Representing Cyprus
Commonwealth Games
Silver medal – second place	2022 Birmingham	All-Around
Silver medal – second place	2022 Birmingham	Hoop
Bronze medal – third place	2022 Birmingham	Ball

Anna Sokolova (Greek: Άννα Σοκολόβα, Russian: Анна Соколова; born 3 May 2004) is a Cypriot rhythmic gymnast of Russian descent. She represents her country at international competitions.

== Career ==
Sokolova made her international debut at the 2018 European Championships in Guadalajara, ending 38th in the All-Around, 70th with hoop, 31st with ball, 49th with clubs and 61st with ribbon.

In 2019 she competed at the 1st Junior World Championships in Moscow along Laura Hernandez, she was 33rd with ball, 45th with clubs and 35th with ribbon.

After the 2020 season was cut short because of the COVID-19 pandemic Anna returned to competition at the 2021 European Championships in Varna, finishing 46th in the All-Around, 53rd with hoop, 38th with ball, 47th with clubs and 44th with ribbon. In October she took part in her first senior World Championships in Kitakyushu where she was 54th in the All-Around, 58th with hoop, 49th with ball, 55th with clubs and 49th with ribbon.

In 2022 she debuted at the World Cup in Sofia, being 37th in the All-Around, 31st with hoop, 37th with ball, 36th with clubs and 35th with ribbon. She then competed in the stage in Baku, where she finished 36th in the All-Around, 33rd with hoop, 35th with ball, 37th with clubs and 28th with ribbon. In June she travelled to Pesaro for the World Cup, ending 35th in the All-Around, 29th with hoop, 37th with ball, 31st with clubs and 35th with ribbon. A couple of weeks later Sokolova competed at the European Championships in Tel Aviv, taking 37th place in the All-Around, 33rd with hoop, 34th with ball, 45th with clubs and 38th with ribbon. In August she represented Cyprus at the Commonwealth Games in Birningham along Neofyta Mavrikiou and Anastasia Pingou, finishing 5th in teams, 7th with clubs, 8th with ribbon, winning silver in the All-Around and with hoop as well as bronze with ball. In late August she attended the last World Cup of the season in Cluj-Napoca finishing 31st in the All-Around and with hoop, 33rd with ball and 30th with clubs and ribbon. At the World Championships in Sofia Anna was the sole representative of Cyprus, ending 31st in the All-Around, 29th with hoop, 28th with ball, 36th with clubs and 39th with ribbon.
