= James Hall (gymnast) =

English artistic gymnast

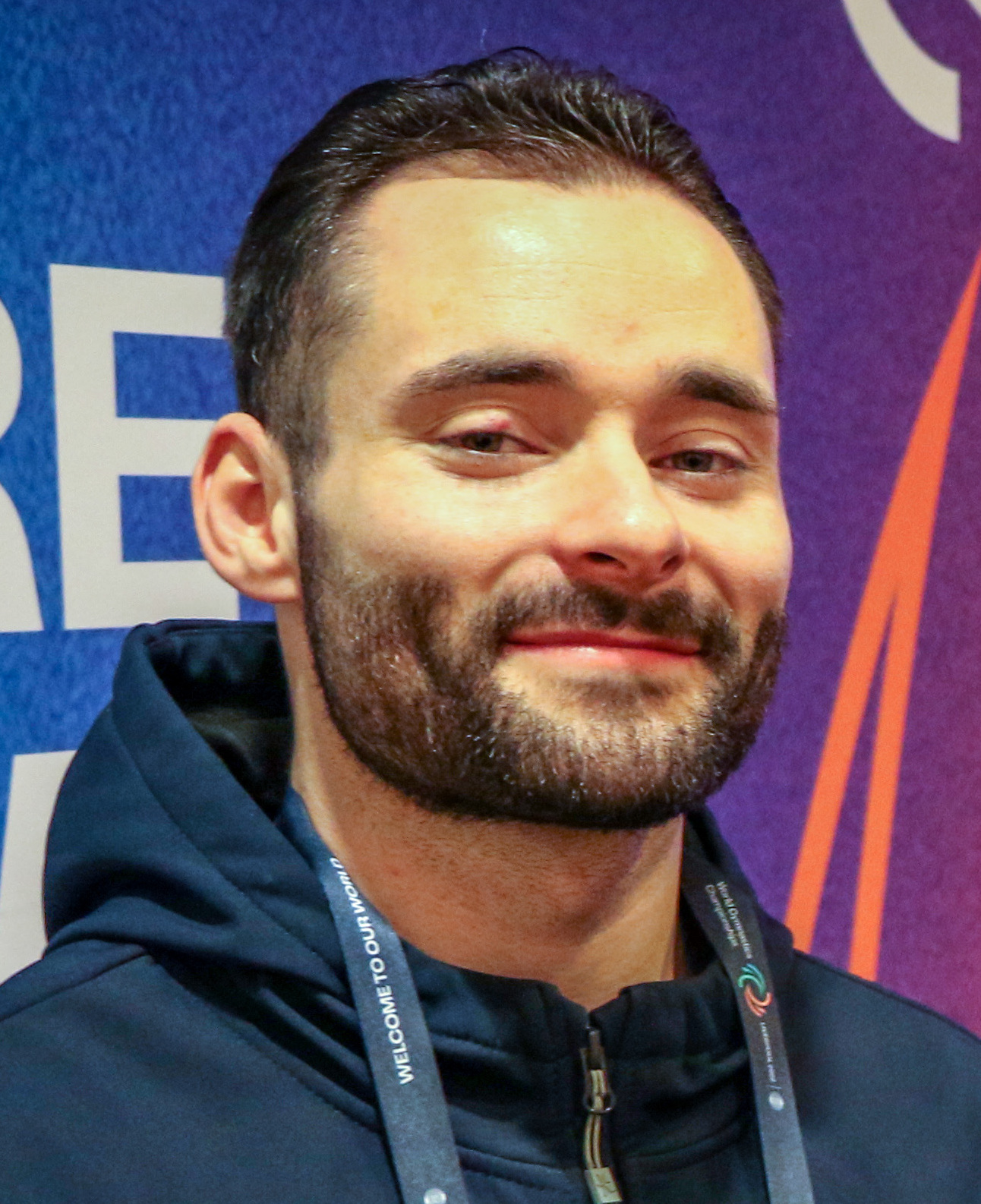
- Hall at the 2022 World Artistic Gymnastics Championships

Personal information
- Full name: James Robert Hall
- Born: 6 October 1995 (age 31) Bankstown, Australia
- Height: 1.7 m (5 ft 7 in)

Gymnastics career
- Discipline: Men's artistic gymnastics
- Country represented: (United Kingdom) Great Britain; England; (2014–2025)
- Club: Pegasus GC
- Head coach: Ionut Trandaburu
- Eponymous skills: Hall (parallel bars)
- Retired: 15 January 2026
Medal record
Men's artistic gymnastics
Representing Great Britain
World Championships
Silver medal – second place	2015 Glasgow	Team
Bronze medal – third place	2022 Liverpool	Team
European Championships
Gold medal – first place	2022 Munich	Team
Silver medal – second place	2018 Glasgow	Team
Silver medal – second place	2024 Rimini	Team
Bronze medal – third place	2017 Cluj-Napoca	All-around
Representing England
Commonwealth Games
Gold medal – first place	2018 Gold Coast	Team
Gold medal – first place	2022 Birmingham	Team
Silver medal – second place	2018 Gold Coast	All-around
Silver medal – second place	2018 Gold Coast	Horizontal bar
Silver medal – second place	2022 Birmingham	All-around

James Robert Hall (born 6 October 1995) is an English former artistic gymnast. He was a member of the English and British Senior teams from 2014–2025. He represented Great Britain at the 2020 Summer Olympics. Hall was the alternate for the silver medal-winning team at the 2015 World Championships and was part of the bronze medal-winning team at the 2022 World Championships. Additionally, he was part of three medal-winning teams at the European Championships and two gold medal-winning teams at the Commonwealth Games. Individually, Hall is the 2017 European all-around bronze medalist, a two-time all-around silver medalist at the Commonwealth Games (2018, 2022), and is the 2018 Commonwealth Games silver medalist on the horizontal bar.

== Early life ==
Hall was born on 6 October 1995 in Bankstown, New South Wales, Australia. His family moved to Kent, England in 1997.

He began gymnastics at age six after a coach encouraged him to do so.

== Gymnastics career ==
=== 2015 ===
Hall was the alternate for the silver medal-winning GB team at the 2015 Glasgow World Championships.

=== 2017 ===
Hall won the all-around bronze medal at the 2017 European Artistic Gymnastics Championships in April 2017, held in Cluj-Napoca, Romania.

=== 2018 ===
At the 2018 Commonwealth Games, Hall was part of the team that won gold in the team event. He also won silver on the individual all-around competition as well as horizontal bar, both behind Nile Wilson.

At the 2018 European Championships in Glasgow, Hall won a silver as part of the team.

=== 2019 ===
In March 2019, Hall won the All-Around title at the British Championships.

He also competed at the European Championships in Szczecin, Poland, as well as the World Championships in Stuttgart, Germany.

=== 2021 ===
At the 2020 Summer Olympics in Tokyo, Japan, Hall competed for Great Britain. The team took fourth place with a score of 255.76.

He also competed in the all around final where he finished in 8th position, one place ahead of teammate Joe Fraser.

=== 2022 ===
At the 2022 Commonwealth Games in Birmingham, Hall was again part of the England team that won gold in the team event. Despite sustaining an ankle injury during the competition, Hall also won silver in the individual all-around behind compatriot Jake Jarman.

=== 2024 ===
At the 2024 European Championships, Hall helped Great Britain finish second as a team behind Ukraine. He was named as the reserve athlete for the Paris 2024 Olympic Games

=== 2025 ===
At the 2025 Doha World Cup, he competed his eponymous skill, a 5/4 salto straddled with ½ turn to upper arms, which was added to the Code of Points.

=== 2026 ===
In January 2026, Hall announced his retirement from gymnastics after more than a decade representing Great Britain.

== Personal life ==
In 2018, Hall became an ambassador for the Young Lives Foundation, a charity that helps disadvantaged youth in Kent, England.

== Eponymous skill ==
Hall has one skill named after him in the Code of Points.

Apparatus	Name	Description	Difficulty (Note: Valid for the 2025–2028 Code of Points)	Added to the Code of Points
Parallel bars	Hall	5/4 salto straddled with ½ turn to upper arms	E (0.5)	2025 Doha World Cup

== Competitive history ==
Competitive history of James Hall
Year	Event	Team	AA	FX	PH	SR	VT	PB	HB
2014	Glasgow World Cup		6						
2015	Varna World Challenge Cup			2nd place, silver medalist(s)					3rd place, bronze medalist(s)
2015	World Championships	2nd place, silver medalist(s)							
2016	Cottbus World Cup		9						
2017	Stuttgart World Cup		5						
2017	European Championships	—N/a	3rd place, bronze medalist(s)						4
2017	World Championships	—N/a		29	21				
2018	American Cup		2nd place, silver medalist(s)						
2018	Birmingham World Cup		3rd place, bronze medalist(s)						
2018	Commonwealth Games	1st place, gold medalist(s)	2nd place, silver medalist(s)		5			5	3rd place, bronze medalist(s)
2018	European Championships	2nd place, silver medalist(s)							5
2018	World Championships	5	8						
2019	American Cup		5						
2019	European Championships	—N/a	7						8
2019	World Championships	5	14						
2020	American Cup		3rd place, bronze medalist(s)						
2021
2021	Olympic Games	4	8						
2022
2022	Commonwealth Games	1st place, gold medalist(s)	2nd place, silver medalist(s)		5				5
2022	European Championships	1st place, gold medalist(s)							4
2022	World Championships	3rd place, bronze medalist(s)							
2023
2023	World Championships	4	9						
2024
2024	European Championships	2nd place, silver medalist(s)						5	
2025	Doha World Cup							7	
