= Ilias Georgiou =

Cypriot artistic gymnast

- Born: 29 June 1999 (age 27) Larnaca, Cyprus
- Height: 1.62 m (5 ft 4 in)

Gymnastics career
- Discipline: Men's artistic gymnastics
- Country represented: Cyprus
- Head coach: Panayiotis Shippi
Medal record
Men's artistic gymnastics
Representing Cyprus
Commonwealth Games
Gold medal – first place	2022 Birmingham	Horizontal bar
Bronze medal – third place	2022 Birmingham	Team
FIG World Cup
Event	1st	2nd	3rd
Apparatus World Cup	0	3	2
World Challenge Cup	1	1	1
Total	1	4	3

Ilias Georgiou (Greek: Ηλίας Γεωργίου; born 29 June 1999) is a Cypriot artistic gymnast. He won a gold medal at the 2022 Commonwealth Games on the horizontal bar in addition to a bronze medal with the team.

== Gymnastics career ==
Georgiou began gymnastics when he was six years old. He competed at the 2016 Junior European Championships and finished 22nd in the all-around final. He also qualified for the still rings final, finishing sixth.

=== 2018 ===
Georgiou represented Cyprus at the 2018 Commonwealth Games, helping the team finish in fourth place. He qualified for the individual all-around final, finishing ninth. He also finished seventh in both the parallel bars and horizontal bar finals. He then competed at the 2018 Mediterranean Games and helped the Cypriot team finish fifth and finishing eighth in the all-around. He also qualified for the parallel bars and horizontal bar finals, finishing eighth and fourth, respectively. He competed at his first World Championships and finished 39th in the all-around qualification round.

=== 2019–2021 ===
Georgiou won a bronze medal on the horizontal bar at the 2019 Osijek World Cup. He then won a bronze medal on the parallel bars at the Koper World Challenge Cup. At the World Championships, he finished 93rd in the all-around qualification and missed out on an Olympic berth. After the World Championships, he won a silver medal on the horizontal bar at the Cottbus World Cup.

At the 2021 Cairo World Cup, Georgiou won silver medals on both the parallel bars and horizontal bar. He finished 14th in the all-around final at the 2021 European Championships. He then competed at the 2021 World Championships and finished eighth in the horizontal bar final.

=== 2022 ===
Georgiou won a bronze medal on the parallel bars at the 2022 Cairo World Cup. He then competed at the 2022 Mediterranean Games and helped the Cypriot team finish sixth. He represented Cyprus at the 2022 Commonwealth Games, helping the team win the bronze medal behind England and Canada. He then won the gold medal in the horizontal bar final, becoming the only non-English gold medalist in the men's events. He then competed at the Paris World Challenge Cup, winning a silver medal on the horizontal bar behind Brody Malone. He qualified for the horizontal bar final at the World Championships, finishing sixth.

=== 2023–2024 ===
Georgiou won a gold medal on the horizontal bar at the 2023 Szombathely World Challenge Cup. He also competed at the Cottbus World Cup and placed eighth in the parallel bars final. At the World Championships, he finished 40th in the all-around during the qualification round and did not earn an Olympic berth.

At the 2024 European Championships, Georgiou helped Cyprus qualify for its first-ever European team final. They went on the finish in seventh place.
