= Cayman Islands at the 2022 Commonwealth Games =

- Flag of the Cayman Islands
- CG code: CAY
- CGA: Cayman Islands Olympic Committee
- Website: caymanolympic.org.ky

in Birmingham, England 28 July 2022 – 8 August 2022
- Competitors: 21 (13 men and 8 women) in 6 sports
- Flag bearers (opening): Rasheem Brown; Alison Jackson
- Flag bearer (closing): TBD
- Medals: Gold 0 Silver 0 Bronze 0 Total 0

Commonwealth Games appearances (overview)
- 1978; 1982; 1986; 1990; 1994; 1998; 2002; 2006; 2010; 2014; 2018; 2022; 2026; 2030

Cayman Islands competed at the 2022 Commonwealth Games held in Birmingham, England. This was Cayman Islands's 12th appearance at the Commonwealth Games.

The Cayman Islands team of 21 athletes competing in six sports was announced on 15 July 2022. Rasheem Brown and Alison Jackson were the country's flagbearers during the opening ceremony.

== Competitors ==
The following is the list of number of competitors participating at the Games per sport/discipline.

Sport	Men	Women	Total
Athletics	3	1	4
Boxing	0	1	1
Cycling	3	0	3
Gymnastics	2	0	2
Squash	4	2	6
Swimming	1	4	5
Total	13	8	21

== Athletics ==
Men
Track and road events

Athlete	Event	Heat		Semifinal		Final	
Athlete	Event	Result	Rank	Result	Rank	Result	Rank
Kemar Hyman	100 m	DNS		Did not advance			
Rasheem Brown	110 m hurdles	13.76	5	—N/a		Did not advance	

Field events

Athlete	Event	Qualification		Final	
Athlete	Event	Distance	Rank	Distance	Rank
Louis Gordon	Long jump	7.43	15	Did not advance	

Women
Track and road events

Athlete	Event	Heat		Semifinal		Final	
Athlete	Event	Result	Rank	Result	Rank	Result	Rank
Shalysa Wray	400 m	53.92	6	Did not advance			

== Boxing ==
Women

Athlete	Event	Round of 16	Quarterfinals	Semifinals	Final	
Athlete	Event	Opposition Result	Opposition Result	Opposition Result	Opposition Result	Rank
Hepseba Angel	Middleweight	Bye	Thibeault (CAN); L RSC	Did not advance		

== Cycling ==
=== Road ===
Men

Athlete	Event	Time	Rank
Nathaniel Forbes	Road race	DNF	
Victor Magalhães	Road race	DNF	
Michael Testori	Road race	DNF	
Victor Magalhães	Time trial	1:00:38.99	43
Michael Testori	Time trial	57:41.29	40

== Gymnastics ==
=== Artistic ===
Men
Individual Qualification

Athlete	Event	Apparatus						Total	Rank
Athlete	Event	F	PH	R	V	PB	HB	Total	Rank
Karthik Adapa	Qualification	10.600	9.100	10.000	11.600	11.150	10.150	62.600	22
Igor De Magalhães	Qualification	10.200	9.250	10.900	12.800	11.200	11.250	65.600	21 Q

Individual Finals

Athlete	Event	Apparatus						Total	Rank
Athlete	Event	F	PH	R	V	PB	HB	Total	Rank
Igor De Magalhães	All-around	10.350	7.950	4.050	12.900	12.050	10.350	57.650	17

== Squash ==
Singles

Athlete	Event	Round of 64	Round of 32	Round of 16	Quarterfinals	Semifinals	Final	
Athlete	Event	Opposition Score	Opposition Score	Opposition Score	Opposition Score	Opposition Score	Opposition Score	Rank
Jace Jervis	Men's singles	Navas (GIB); L 1 - 3	Did not advance					
Julian Jervis	Men's singles	Anafo (GHA); W 3 - 0	Rooney (ENG); L 0 - 3	Did not advance				
Jake Kelly	Men's singles	Matanatabu (FIJ); W 3 - 2	Waller (ENG); L 0 - 3	Did not advance				
Jade Pitcairn	Women's singles	S-Padmore (BAR); W 3 - 0	Perry (ENG); L 0 - 3	Did not advance				

Doubles

Athlete	Event	Round of 32	Round of 16	Quarterfinals	Semifinals	Final	
Athlete	Event	Opposition Score	Opposition Score	Opposition Score	Opposition Score	Opposition Score	Rank
Julian Jervis; Cameron Stafford	Men's doubles	Sultana / Engerer (MLT); L 1 - 2	Did not advance				
Jake Kelly; Jace Jervis	Men's doubles	Alexander / Cuskelly (AUS); L 0 - 2	Did not advance				
Marlene West; Jade Pitcairn	Women's doubles	Katse / Phatsima (BOT); W 2 - 0	Perry / Waters (ENG); L 0 - 2	Did not advance			
Cameron Stafford; Marlene West	Mixed doubles	Bunyan / Baillargeon (CAN); W 2 - 0	Lobban / Aitken (SCO); L 0 - 2	Did not advance			
Jade Pitcairn; Jake Kelly	Mixed doubles	Grinham / Alexander (AUS); L 0 - 2	Did not advance				

== Swimming ==
Men

Athlete	Event	Heat		Semifinal		Final	
Athlete	Event	Time	Rank	Time	Rank	Time	Rank
James Allison	50 m freestyle	24.21	34	Did not advance			
James Allison	100 m freestyle	53.08	41	Did not advance			
James Allison	200 m freestyle	1:54.14	24	—N/a		Did not advance	
James Allison	100 m butterfly	59.21	41	Did not advance			

Women

Athlete	Event	Heat		Semifinal		Final	
Athlete	Event	Time	Rank	Time	Rank	Time	Rank
Sierrah Broadbelt	50 m freestyle	28.13	45	Did not advance			
Kyra Rabess	50 m freestyle	27.29	30	Did not advance			
Sierrah Broadbelt	100 m freestyle	1:00.82	38	Did not advance			
Kyra Rabess	100 m freestyle	59.29	30	Did not advance			
Harper Barrowman	200 m freestyle	2:07.98	17	—N/a		Did not advance	
Kyra Rabess	200 m freestyle	2:07.67	16	—N/a		Did not advance	
Harper Barrowman	400 m freestyle	4:28.02	13	—N/a		Did not advance	
Raya Embury-Brown	400 m freestyle	4:41.74	18	—N/a		Did not advance	
Kyra Rabess	400 m freestyle	4:30.11	14	—N/a		Did not advance	
Harper Barrowman	800 m freestyle	9:16.49	8 Q	—N/a		9:13.97	8
Raya Embury-Brown	800 m freestyle	9:30.75	10	—N/a		Did not advance	
