= Georgios Angonas =

Cypriot artistic gymnast (born 2003)

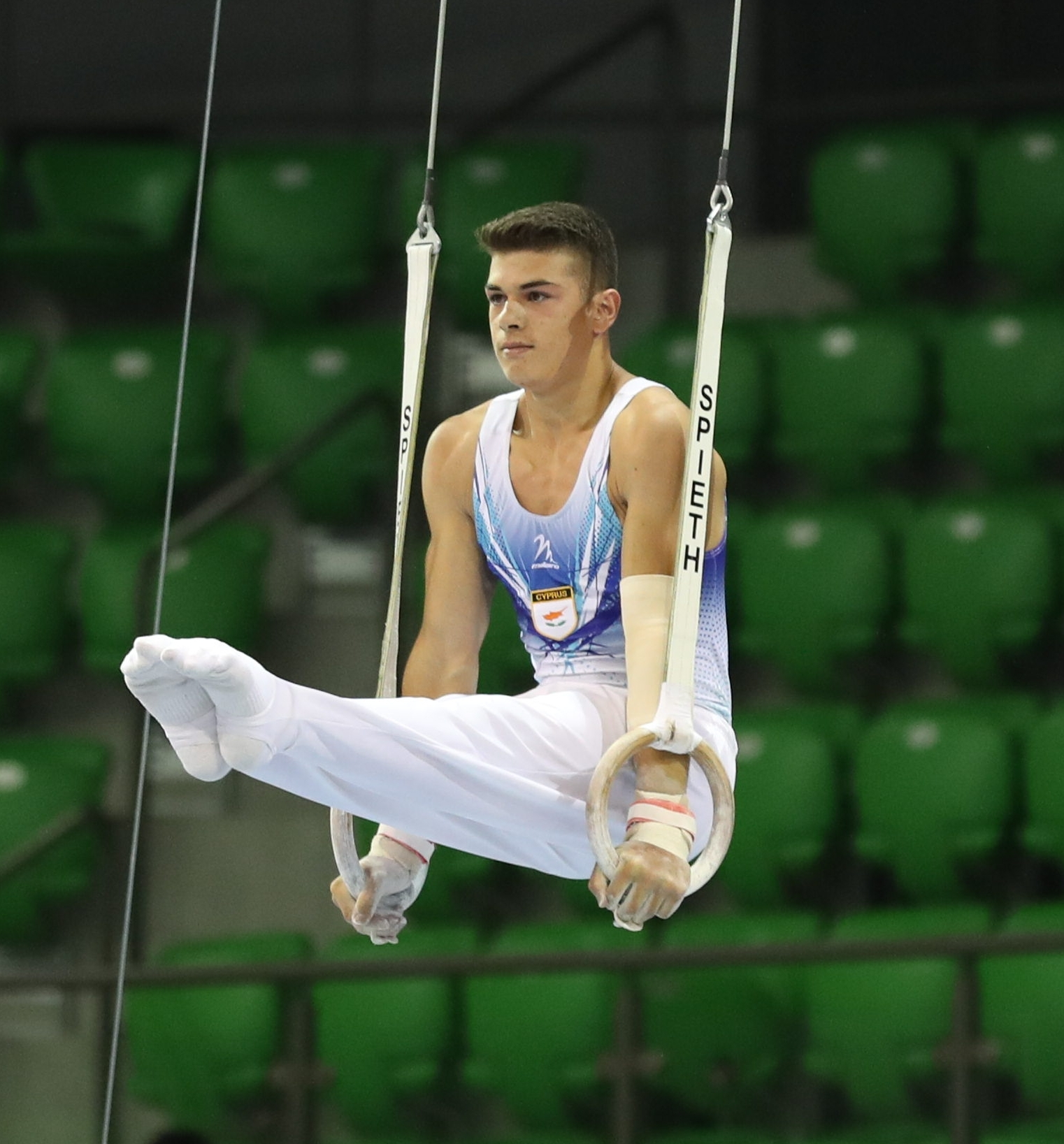
- Angonas at the 2019 Junior World Championships

Personal information
- Born: 27 May 2003 (age 23) Limassol, Cyprus

Gymnastics career
- Discipline: Men's artistic gymnastics
- Country represented: Cyprus
- Head coach: Irodotos Georgallas
Medal record
Men's artistic gymnastics
Representing Cyprus
Commonwealth Games
Bronze medal – third place	2022 Birmingham	Team
Games of the Small States of Europe
Gold medal – first place	2025 Andorra la Vella	Team
Gold medal – first place	2025 Andorra la Vella	All-around
Gold medal – first place	2025 Andorra la Vella	Parallel bars
Gold medal – first place	2025 Andorra la Vella	Horizontal bar
Silver medal – second place	2025 Andorra la Vella	Vault

Georgios Angonas (Greek: Γεώργιος Αγγώνας; born 27 May 2003) is a Greek Cypriot artistic gymnast. He won a bronze medal in the team event at the 2022 Commonwealth Games. He won the individual all-around title at the 2025 Games of the Small States of Europe.

== Gymnastics career ==
Angonas competed at the 2019 Junior World Championships and finished 81st in the all-around. At the 2021 European Championships, he finished 65th in the all-around qualifications.

Angonas competed with the Cypriot team that finished sixth at the 2022 Mediterranean Games. Then in the all-around final, he finished 14th. He then represented Cyprus at the 2022 Commonwealth Games and helped the team win the bronze medal behind England and Canada. This marked the first time a Cyprus gymnastics team won a Commonwealth Games medal. Individually, he advanced into the all-around final and finished 13th. At the 2022 European Championships, he finished 44th in the all-around qualifications and qualified for the 2022 World Championships. There, he finished 55th in the all-around qualifications and did not advance into any finals.

At the 2024 European Championships, Angonas helped Cyprus qualify for their first-ever European team final, where they ultimately finished seventh. He competed on the vault, parallel bars, and horizontal bar at the 2024 Szombathely World Challenge Cup but did not advance into any finals.

At the 2025 Games of the Small States of Europe, Angonas led Cyprus to the team title and also won the individual all-around title. In the event finals, he won more gold medals on the parallel bars and horizontal bar, and he won a silver medal on the vault.
