= Jesse Moore (gymnast) =

Australian artistic gymnast

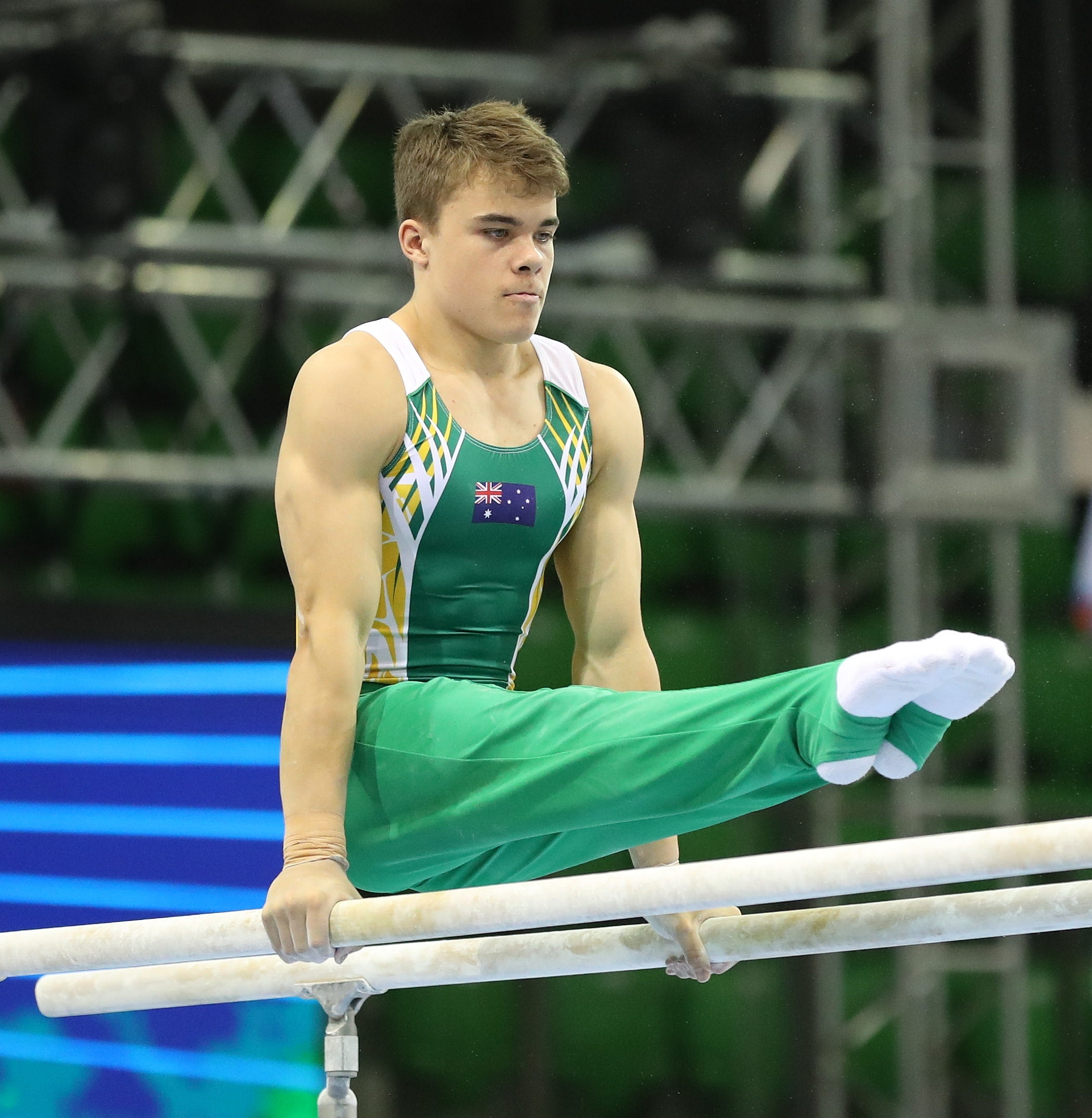
- Moore at the 2019 Junior World Championships

Personal information
- Born: 13 February 2003 (age 23) Ashford, South Australia

Gymnastics career
- Discipline: Men's artistic gymnastics
- Country represented: Australia
- Training location: Canberra
- Club: Australian Institute of Sport
- Gym: GymJets
- Head coach: Paul Szyjko
Medal record
Representing Australia
Commonwealth Games
Gold medal – first place	2026 Glasgow	Parallel bars
Bronze medal – third place	2026 Glasgow	Team
Bronze medal – third place	2026 Glasgow	All-around
Oceania Championships
Gold medal – first place	2022 Carrara	All-around
Gold medal – first place	2024 Auckland	All-around
Gold medal – first place	2026 Brisbane	All-around
Bronze medal – third place	2021 Gold Coast	All-around

Jesse Moore (born 13 February 2003) is an Australian artistic gymnast. He represented Australia at the 2024 Olympic Games. He is the 2026 Commonwealth Games champion on parallel bars.

== Early life ==
Moore was born in 2003 in Ashford, South Australia. He began gymnastics when he was six years old.

== Gymnastics career ==
=== Junior ===
Moore won the under-12 category at the 2015 Australian Championships by only 0.065 after falling off the horizontal bar twice. He went on to win three more consecutive national all-around titles in his age group from 2016 to 2018. He made his international debut in 2018 and won a bronze medal on the horizontal bar at the 2018 Pacific Rim Championships. He competed at the 2019 Junior World Championships, helping Australia placed 12th as a team and finishing 25th in the all-around. He qualified for the horizontal bar final and placed seventh.

=== Senior ===
Moore made his senior international debut at the 2021 Oceania Championships and finished fourth in the all-around, missing out on the continental berth for the Tokyo Olympic Games. He won the silver medal in the all-around at the 2021 Australian Championships. In the event finals, he won silver on floor exercise and parallel bars.

In 2022, Moore received a scholarship from the Sport Australia Hall of Fame to fund his training. He was the youngest member of Australia's artistic gymnastics team at the 2022 Commonwealth Games. The Australian team placed fourth, 0.650 away from a medal. He withdrew after the third rotation of the all-around final due to a shoulder injury. He then withdrew from the horizontal bar final. He still competed in the pommel horse event final and placed sixth. He had surgery on his shoulder after the competition.

Moore only competed on the floor exercise at the 2023 Australian Championships, placing tenth. He was the alternate for the 2023 World Championships team.

At the 2024 Australian Championships, Moore won the all-around title by over two points. He then won the all-around gold medal at the 2024 Oceania Championships. With the result, he earned the continental berth for the 2024 Olympic Games. He is the first gymnast from South Australia to qualify for the Olympic Games.

Moore competed at the 2026 Commonwealth Games where he helped Australia win bronze as a team. Individually he qualified to the all-around, pommel horse, rings, and parallel bars finals. During the all-around final, he won bronze behind Reuben Ward and Félix Dolci. Moore became the first Australian male gymnast to win a Commonwealth Games all-around medal in sixteen years. During event finals Moore placed seventh on pommel horse and eighth on rings before going on to win gold on parallel bars.

== Eponymous skill ==
Moore has one skill named after him in the Code of Points.

Apparatus	Name	Description	Difficulty (Note: Valid for the 2025–2028 Code of Points)	Added to the Code of Points
Pommel horse	Moore	Bertoncelj to Busnari	G (0.7)	2025 Doha World Cup
