= Hamish Carter (gymnast) =

British artistic gymnast (born 1998)

- Full name: Hamish Alexander Carter
- Born: 24 November 1998 (age 27)

Gymnastics career
- Discipline: Men's artistic gymnastics
- Country represented: (United Kingdom) Great Britain; Scotland
- College team: Illinois Fighting Illini (2019–2022)
Medal record
Men's artistic gymnastics
Representing Scotland
Commonwealth Games
Bronze medal – third place	2018 Gold Coast	Team
Northern European Championships
Gold medal – first place	2017 Tórshavn	Floor Exercise
Gold medal – first place	2017 Tórshavn	Horizontal Bar
Silver medal – second place	2017 Tórshavn	Rings
Silver medal – second place	2023 Halmstad	Floor Exercise
Bronze medal – third place	2017 Tórshavn	All Around

Hamish Alexander Carter (born 24 November 1998) is a British artistic gymnast. He won gold in the team all-around and silver on the floor at the 2015 European Youth Summer Olympic Festival. He represented Scotland at the 2018 Commonwealth Games: he won a bronze medal in the team all-around event alongside Frank Baines, Daniel Purvis, David Weir and Kelvin Cham, placed 6th in the individual all-around event, and placed 4th in the individual floor event.

Carter was born on 24 November 1998 in Sutton Coldfield, Birmingham, England. He has Scottish heritage through his mother. He was educated at Bishop Vesey's Grammar School, a state grammar school in Sutton Coldfield.
