= Mikhail Koudinov =

New Zealand artistic gymnast (born 1991)

- Full name: Mikhail Alexandrovich Koudinov
- Nickname: Misha
- Born: 23 June 1991 (age 35) Vladivostok, Russian SFSR, Soviet Union
- Height: 1.60 m (5 ft 3 in)

Gymnastics career
- Discipline: Men's artistic gymnastics
- Country represented: New Zealand; (2007–present)
- College team: Ohio State Buckeyes (2010–2014)
- Club: Tristar Gymnastics Club
- Head coach: David Phillips
Medal record
Representing New Zealand
Oceania Championships
Gold medal – first place	2021 Gold Coast	All-around
Gold medal – first place	2022 Gold Coast	Parallel bars
Gold medal – first place	2023 Carrara	All-around
Gold medal – first place	2023 Carrara	Parallel bars
Gold medal – first place	2023 Carrara	Horizontal bar
Silver medal – second place	2022 Gold Coast	Team
Silver medal – second place	2022 Gold Coast	All-around
Silver medal – second place	2023 Carrara	Team
Bronze medal – third place	2022 Gold Coast	Rings
Bronze medal – third place	2023 Carrara	Pommel horse
Bronze medal – third place	2023 Carrara	Vault

Mikhail Alexandrovich Koudinov (born 23 June 1991) is a New Zealand artistic gymnast. He is a two-time Oceania all-around champion, and competed at the 2016 and 2020 Summer Olympics. He has represented New Zealand at five Commonwealth Games.

== Early life ==
Koudinov was born in Vladivostok to parents Alexander (Sasha) and Alexandra, both former gymnasts and coaches. His maternal grandparents were also former gymnasts. The family moved to Auckland, New Zealand, when he was six years old. He began gymnastics at the age of seven, and his father was his first coach.

== Gymnastics career ==
At the 2006 Commonwealth Games in Melbourne, Koudinov was New Zealand's youngest representative at the age of 14. He placed eighth with New Zealand in the team competition, and he finished 20th in the all-around final. He competed in his first World Championships in 2007 in Stuttgart, Germany.

At the 2009 World Championships, Koudinov placed 59th in the all-around qualifications. He moved to the United States in 2010 to compete for the Ohio State Buckeyes gymnastics team. He represented New Zealand at the 2010 Commonwealth Games and placed fourth with the team. He finished sixth in the individual all-around final.

Koudinov finished eighth in the all-around at the 2014 Commonwealth Games. He then finished 50th in the all-around qualifications at the 2014 World Championships. Then at the 2015 World Championships, he finished 48th in the all-around qualifications and advanced to the 2016 Olympic Test Event. There, he finished 43rd in the all-around and earned a berth to the 2016 Summer Olympics.

Koudinov was one of three New Zealand gymnasts who competed in the 2016 Summer Olympics in Rio; the other two were Courtney McGregor and Dylan Schmidt. Collectively, they became New Zealand's first Olympic gymnasts since 2000. He placed 45th in the all-around qualifications and did not advance into any finals.

Koudinov planned on retiring after the 2017 World Championships and moved back to New Zealand, but the national team head coach convinced him to continue for the 2018 Commonwealth Games. There, he helped the team place sixth, and he placed 15th in the all-around final.

Koudinov won the all-around title at the 2021 Oceania Championships and also won the continental berth for the 2020 Summer Olympics. There, he placed 52nd in the all-around qualifications and did not advance into any finals. In 2022, Koudinov was selected to compete at his fifth Commonwealth Games. However, he had to withdraw from the all-around final due to an injury.

Koudinov won the all-around title at the 2023 Oceania Championships and advanced to the 2023 World Championships. There, he finished 51st in the all-around qualifications. He was not able to compete at the 2024 Oceania Championships due to an injury and therefore could not qualify for the 2024 Summer Olympics.

== Eponymous skill ==
At the 2017 World Championships, Koudinov competed an original horizontal bar release move, a Gaylord with a full turn. He fell on the skill twice before catching it. As the first gymnast to complete the move at a major international competition, it is named after him in the Code of Points. He became only the second New Zealander to have a skill named in the Code of Points.

Apparatus	Name	Description	Difficulty (Note: Valid for the 2025–2028 Code of Points)	Added to Code of Points
Horizontal bar	Koudinov	Gaylord with 1/1 turn	H (0.8)	2017 World Championships

== Personal life ==
Koudinov graduated from Ohio State University with degrees in economics and Japanese. He speaks English, Japanese, Russian, and Chinese. Since 2017, he has coached fellow gymnasts at the Tristar Gymnastics Club to pay for his training and travel expenses. His daughter was born in 2020.
