= Frank Baines (gymnast) =

Scottish artistic gymnast (born 1995)

- Born: 16 July 1995 (age 31)

Gymnastics career
- Discipline: Men's artistic gymnastics
- Country represented: (United Kingdom) Great Britain; Scotland
- Retired: 17 December 2019
Medal record
Men's artistic gymnastics
Representing Scotland
Commonwealth Games
Silver medal – second place	2014 Glasgow	Team
Bronze medal – third place	2018 Gold Coast	Team
Bronze medal – third place	2018 Gold Coast	Parallel Bars

Frank Baines (born 16 July 1995, in Liverpool) is a Scottish and British retired artistic gymnast.

Baines represented Scotland at the 2014 Commonwealth Games in Glasgow. As part of the Scotland team, he won a silver medal in the Team competition. In 2018 in the Gold Coast he won bronze medals in the team event and on parallel bars.

In 2019, Baines was the Scottish Senior All-Around Champion.
