= Artistic gymnastics at the 2026 Commonwealth Games – Women's uneven bars =

Women's uneven bars at the 2026 Commonwealth Games
- Venue: OVO Hydro
- Dates: 25 July 2026 (qualification); 27 July 2026 (final)
- Competitors: 8 from 6 nations
- Winning score: 14.333

Medalists
gold medal	Kate McDonald	Australia
silver medal	Ellie Black	Canada
bronze medal	Emily Roper	Wales

The Women's uneven bars gymnastics competition at the 2026 Commonwealth Games in Glasgow, Scotland was held on 27 July 2026 at OVO Hydro.

== Schedule ==
The schedule was as follows:

All times are British Summer Time (UTC+1)

Date	Time	Round
Saturday 25 July 2026	09:09	Qualification
Monday 27 July 2026	15:40	Final

== Results ==
=== Qualification ===
Qualification for this apparatus final was determined within the team final.

The results are as follows:

Rank	Gymnast	Difficulty	Execution	Penalty	Total	Notes
1	Kate McDonald (AUS)	6.000	8.200		14.200	Q
2	Ellie Black (CAN)	5.900	7.950		13.850	Q
3	Rachel Yeoh Li Wen (MAS)	5.600	8.200		13.800	Q
4	Emily Roper (WAL)	5.300	8.300		13.600	Q
5	Shantae-Eve Amankwaah (ENG)	5.700	7.800		13.500	Q
6	Ruby Pass (AUS)	5.500	7.900		13.400	Q
7	Ruby Evans (WAL)	5.200	8.100		13.300	Q
8	Jemima Taylor (WAL)	5.300	8.000		13.300	–
9	Breanna Scott (AUS)	5.000	8.150		13.150	–
10	Georgia Godwin (AUS)	5.200	7.600		12.800	–
11	Alana Walker (JAM)	5.200	7.600		12.800	Q
12	Abigail Martin (ENG)	5.600	7.200		12.800	R1
13	Lia Redick (CAN)	5.100	7.550		12.650	R2
14	Alia Leat (ENG)	4.500	7.950		12.450	–
15	Jun McDonald (NZL)	4.800	7.650		12.450	R3

=== Final ===
The results are as follows:

Rank	Gymnast	Country	Difficulty	Execution	Penalty	Total
1st place, gold medalist(s)	Kate McDonald	Australia	6.000	8.333		14.333
2nd place, silver medalist(s)	Ellie Black	Canada	5.900	8.000		13.900
3rd place, bronze medalist(s)	Emily Roper	Wales	5.400	8.266		13.666
4	Rachel Yeoh Li Wen	Malaysia	5.700	7.833		13.533
5	Shantae-Eve Amankwaah	England	5.700	7.533		13.233
6	Alana Walker	Jamaica	5.200	7.333		12.533
7	Jemima Taylor	Wales	5.100	6.666		11.766
8	Ruby Pass	Australia	4.500	7.166		11.666
