= Emily Roper (gymnast) =

Welsh artistic gymnast (born 2005)

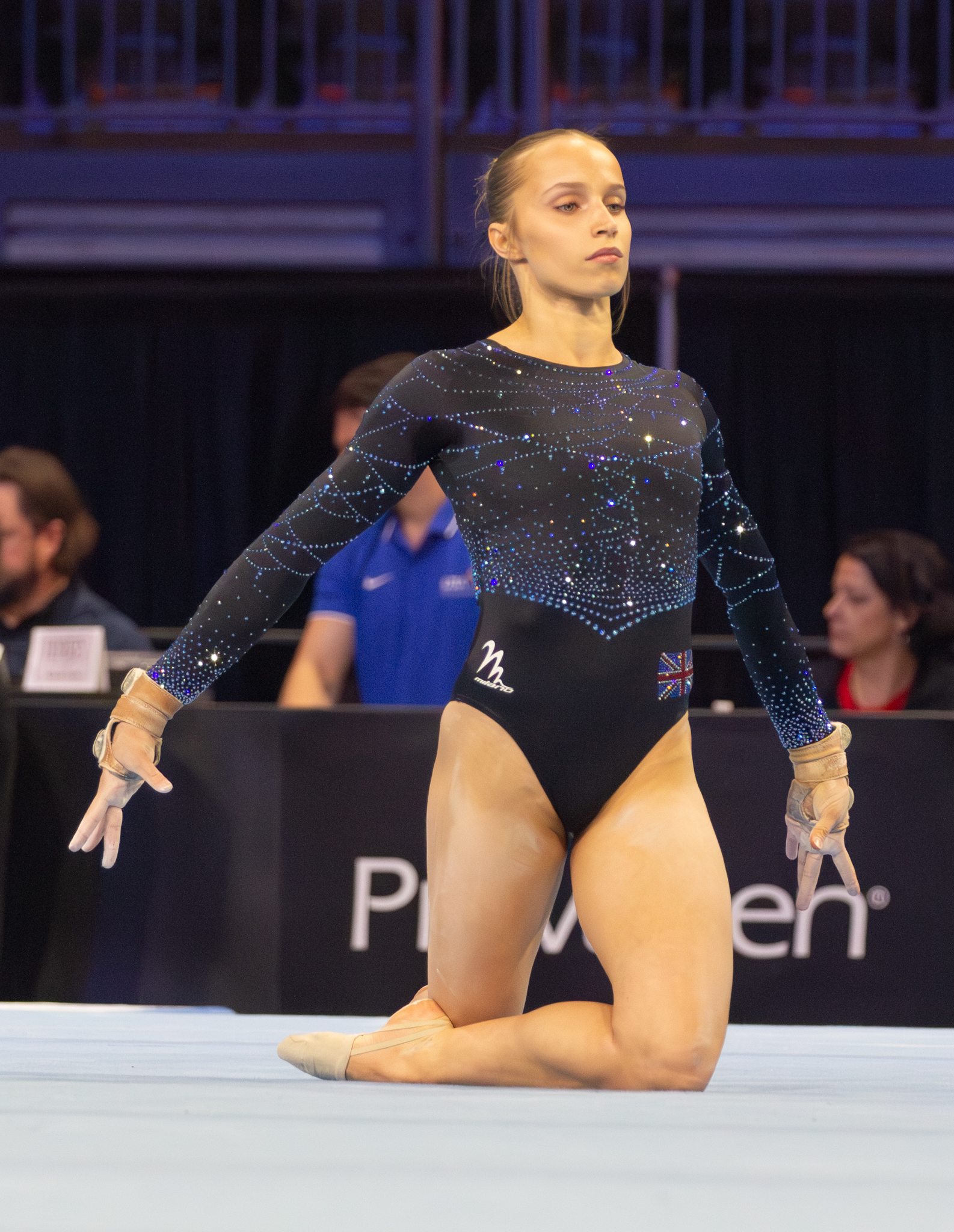
- Roper at the 2026 American Cup

Personal information
- Full name: Emily Kate Roper
- Born: 7 September 2005 (age 21) Ipswich, England
- Relatives: Abigail Roper (sister)

Gymnastics career
- Discipline: Women's artistic gymnastics
- Country represented: Wales (2023–present) (United Kingdom) Great Britain; (2023–present)
- Former countries represented: England (2017–2023)
- College team: University of Essex (2025-2027)
- Club: Pipers Vale Gymnastics Club
- Head coaches: Josie Hayes; Rebecca Hambling
Medal record
Women's artistic gymnastics
Representing Great Britain
FIG World Cup
Event / 1st / 2nd / 3rd; World Challenge Cup / 0 / 1 / 1
Representing Wales
Commonwealth Games
| Bronze medal – third place | 2026 Glasgow | Uneven bars |
Northern European Championships
| Gold medal – first place | 2023 Halmstad | Team |
| Gold medal – first place | 2023 Halmstad | Vault |
Representing England
Northern European Championships
| Silver medal – second place | 2022 Jyväskylä | Team |
| Silver medal – second place | 2022 Jyväskylä | Vault |

Emily Kate Roper (born 7 September 2005) is a Welsh artistic gymnast and member of the British national team. She represented Wales at the 2026 Commonwealth Games where she won bronze on unevan bars and represented Great Britain at the 2025 European Championships.

She trains at Pipers Vale Gymnastics Club alongside her twin sister Abigail Roper who is also an artistic gymnast.

== Early life and education ==
Roper attended Copleston High School in Ipswich alongside her sister. In 2025 Roper and her sister began studying Sports and Exercise Science at the University of Essex, on the Colchester campus. Born in England, she is of Welsh descent.

== Senior gymnastics career ==
=== 2021 ===
At her first British Championships as a senior Roper placed fourth in the all-around behind Ondine Achampong, Ruby Stacey and Emily Todd but won bronze in the vault and beam apparatus finals.

=== 2022 ===
At the 2022 English Championships Roper won bronze on vault. Later that month she won silver at the British Championships behind Jessica Gadirova.

She was named in the England team at the 2022 Leverkusen Cup alongside Tommera Hendricks and Veronika Kritski. They won bronze in the team competition.

Roper was then selected for her first Northern European Gymnastics Championships in 2022 as part of the English team. She won silver in the team competition finishing behind Wales, where her twin sister Abigail Roper was competing, and also on vault.

=== 2023 ===
At the 2023 English championships Roper placed seventh in the all-around and won gold on vault, her first senior gold medal. She then attended her first Welsh Championships, placing second on vault. Roper claimed another silver medal on vault, this time at the British Championships.

Roper switched nationality to represent Wales and competed at the 2023 Leverkusen Cup alongside her sister, Abigail Roper. The duo placed second in the team competition and individually Roper won gold in the all-around and on floor, as well as silver on bars and bronze on vault.

She was then selected to compete at the 2023 Northern European Gymnastics Championships in Halmstad alongside Ruby Evans, Poppy-Grace Stickler, Evie Flage-Donovan, Annais Kamanga and her sister Abigail Roper. She helped Wales win the team competition and individually won gold on vault.

=== 2024 ===
At the 2024 British Championships Roper won bronze on vault and floor exercise as well as placing fourth on beam and seventh in the all-around.

=== 2025 ===
Roper was selected to represent Great Britain at the 2025 Cottbus world cup alongside Ruby Evans and Charlotte Booth where she placed fourth in the uneven bar apparatus finals.

At the 2025 British Championships Roper won bronze in the all-around and was national champion on uneven bars.

Roper attended the 2025 Varna World Challenge Cup alongside Ruby Stacey where she placed fourth on beam and sixth on vault and bars.

She was selected for her first senior major international championships as part of the British squad for the 2025 European Championships alongside Alia Leat, Ruby Evans, Frances Stone and Ruby Stacey. She competed on the uneven bars, balance beam and floor exercise and helped the team place sixth.

=== 2026 ===
Roper competed in the all-around competition at Welsh Championships, where she took silver in the national competition behind her sister Abigail Roper. She qualified for all the apparatus finals, winning gold on vault and floor exercise and silver on uneven bars and balance beam. Roper was selected to represent Great Britain at the 2026 American Cup alongside Abigail Martin, Ruby Stacey, Oakley Banks, Sam Mostowfi and Sol Scott. The team placed fifth overall. Roper was named in the Welsh team for the 2026 Commonwealth Games alongside Ruby Evans, Frances Stone, Jemima Taylor and her sister Abigail Roper. She helped the team finish fourth and individually qualified to the all-around, vault and uneven bars finals. Roper made history by picking up a bronze medal on uneven bars, the same day as her sister Abigail Roper won bronze on vault.

== Competitive History ==
Competitive history of Emily Roper at the junior level
| Year | Event | Team | AA | VT | UB | BB | FX |
|---|---|---|---|---|---|---|---|
| 2017 | British Championships | | 24 | | | | |
| 2017 | British Team Championships | | 22 | | | | |
| 2018 | English Championships | | 29 | | | | |
| 2018 | British Championships | | 18 | | | | |
| 2018 | British Team Championships | | 19 | | | | |
| 2019 | English Championships | | 22 | | | | |
| 2019 | British Championships | | 18 | | | | |
| 2019 | British Team Championships | | 14 | 3rd place, bronze medalist(s) | | | 3rd place, bronze medalist(s) |

Competitive history of Emily Roper at the senior level
| Year | Event | Team | AA | VT | UB | BB | FX |
Representing England Great Britain
| 2021 | British Championships | | 4 | 3rd place, bronze medalist(s) | | 3rd place, bronze medalist(s) | |
| 2022 | English Championships | | | 3rd place, bronze medalist(s) | | | |
| 2022 | British Championships | | 14 | 2nd place, silver medalist(s) | | | |
| 2022 | Leverkusen Cup | 3rd place, bronze medalist(s) | 10 | | | | |
| 2022 | British Team Championships | 3rd place, bronze medalist(s) | | 1st place, gold medalist(s) | | | |
| 2022 | Northern European Championships | 2nd place, silver medalist(s) | | 2nd place, silver medalist(s) | | | |
| 2023 | English Championships | | | 1st place, gold medalist(s) | | | |
| 2023 | Welsh Championships (guest) | | | 2nd place, silver medalist(s) | | | |
| 2023 | British Championships | | 7 | 2nd place, silver medalist(s) | | | |
Representing Wales Great Britain
| 2023 | Leverkusen Cup | | 1st place, gold medalist(s) | 3rd place, bronze medalist(s) | 2nd place, silver medalist(s) | | 1st place, gold medalist(s) |
| 2023 | Northern European Championships | 1st place, gold medalist(s) | | 1st place, gold medalist(s) | | | |
| 2024 | Welsh Championships | | 3rd place, bronze medalist(s) | 2nd place, silver medalist(s) | | 2nd place, silver medalist(s) | 2nd place, silver medalist(s) |
| 2024 | English Championships (guest) | | 1st place, gold medalist(s) | 1st place, gold medalist(s) | 1st place, gold medalist(s) | 1st place, gold medalist(s) | 2nd place, silver medalist(s) |
| 2024 | British Championships | 7 | | 3rd place, bronze medalist(s) | | 4 | 3rd place, bronze medalist(s) |
| 2025 | Welsh Championships | | | | 5 | | |
| 2025 | Cottbus World Cup | | | | 4 | | |
| 2025 | English Championships (guest) | | 1st place, gold medalist(s) | | 1st place, gold medalist(s) | | 1st place, gold medalist(s) |
| 2025 | British Championships | | 3rd place, bronze medalist(s) | | 1st place, gold medalist(s) | | |
| 2025 | Varna Challenge Cup | | | 6 | 6 | 4 | |
| 2025 | European Championships | 6 | | | | | |
| 2026 | Welsh Championships | | 2nd place, silver medalist(s) | 1st place, gold medalist(s) | 2nd place, silver medalist(s) | 2nd place, silver medalist(s) | 1st place, gold medalist(s) |
| 2026 | British Championships | | 7 | 2nd place, silver medalist(s) | | | |
| 2026 | American Cup | 5 | | | | | |
| 2026 | Commonwealth Games | 4 | 7 | 4 | 3rd place, bronze medalist(s) | | |
| 2026 | Szombathely World Challenge Cup | | | 2nd place, silver medalist(s) | | 3rd place, bronze medalist(s) | |
