= Ruby Stacey =

British artistic gymnast (born 2005)

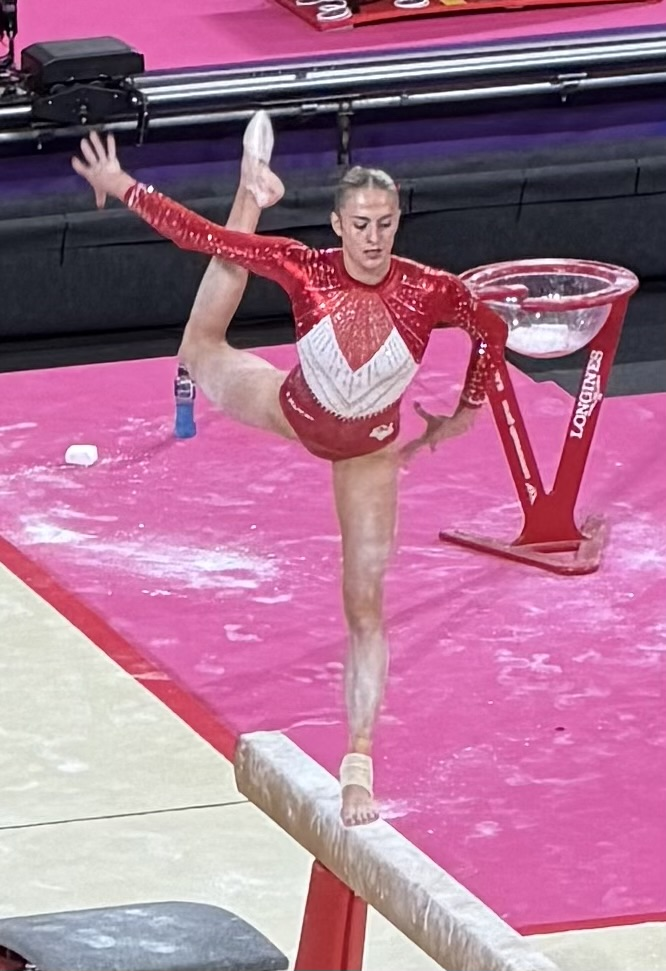
- Stacey at the 2026 Commonwealth Games

Personal information
- Full name: Ruby Stacey
- Born: 10 March 2005 (age 21)

Gymnastics career
- Discipline: Women's artistic gymnastics
- Country represented: (United Kingdom) Great Britain; (2019–present)
- Club: Plymouth Swallows Gymnastics Club
- Head coach: Jemma Maskell
Medal record
Representing Great Britain
FIG World Cup
Event	1st	2nd	3rd
World Challenge Cup	1	1	1
Total	1	1	1
Representing England
Commonwealth Games
Bronze medal – third place	2026 Glasgow	Team

Ruby Stacey (born 10 March 2005) is a British artistic gymnast and national team member. She represented Great Britain at the 2021 World Artistic Gymnastics Championships and 2025 European Championships as well as England at the 2026 Commonwealth Games.

== Junior gymnastics career ==
=== Espoir - 2018 ===
At her first British Championships, Stacey won gold on bars, silver in the all-around and bronze on vault.

She was selected to represented Great Britain at the 2018 Olympic Hopes Cup, alongside Halle Hilton, Alia Leat, Mia Scott and Amelia Thomas. The team placed second, with Stacey winning gold on bars and bronze on floor.

=== Junior - 2019 ===
Stacey was named as a reserve for the 2019 Junior World Championships.

== Senior gymnastics career ==
=== 2021 ===
Stacey was selected for the 2021 World Championships, alongside Georgia-Mae Fenton and Becky Downie. It was her first major championships. She qualified for the all-around final, where she placed 15th.

At the British Championships, she won gold on uneven bars and bronze in the all-around.

=== 2022 ===
Stacey attended the Koper Challenge Cup, where she won bronze on uneven bars. She later competed at the Mersin Challenge Cup, where she placed 5th in the floor final.

=== 2023 ===
At English championships, Stacey finished behind Ondine Achampong to win silver in the all-around, as well as winning a further silver on vault and bronze on bars. She competed at the Doha World Cup, making the vault and floor finals; she placed 7th in both. She later competed at both the Szombathely and Paris Challenge Cups. In Paris, she made the beam final and placed 8th.

=== 2024 ===
At the 2024 British Championships, Stacey won silver on uneven bars, her third British medal, and also placed 7th in the all-around. She attended the Antayla Challenge Cup, where she made the vault final and placed 7th.

She was selected as a reserve for the 2024 Olympic Games.

=== 2025 ===
Stacey picked up a full set of medals at English championships, winning gold on bars, silver in the all-around and bronze on floor.

She attended the 2025 Varna World Challenge Cup along with Emily Roper. She won gold on vault and silver in the uneven bar finals.

Stacey was named to the British squad for the 2025 European Championships alongside Alia Leat, Emily Roper, Ruby Evans and Frances Stone. She competed on the vault and uneven bars and helped the team place sixth.

=== 2026 ===
She competed in the all-around competition at Welsh Championships, where she won gold in the open competition. At English Championships she finished fourth in the all-around, winning gold on balance beam and silver on vault.

Stacey was selected to represent Great Britain at the 2026 American Cup alongside Abigail Martin, Emily Roper, Oakley Banks, Sam Mostowfi and Sol Scott. The team placed fifth overall.

At British Championships Stacey won silver in the all-around competition and on the balance beam.

In June, Stacey was announced as part of the English team at the 2026 Commonwealth Games, alongside Abigail Martin, Alia Leat, Taeja James (later replaced by Shanna-Kae Grant), and Shantae-Eve Amankwaah. She helped the team win bronze and qualified for the vault final where she finished 8th.

== Competition history ==
Competitive history of Ruby Stacey at the junior level
Year	Event	Team	AA	VT	UB	BB	FX
2018	English Championships		1st place, gold medalist(s)		1st place, gold medalist(s)	3rd place, bronze medalist(s)	2nd place, silver medalist(s)
2018	British Championships		2nd place, silver medalist(s)	3rd place, bronze medalist(s)	1st place, gold medalist(s)	6	
2018	Olympic Hopes Cup	2nd place, silver medalist(s)	7		1st place, gold medalist(s)		3rd place, bronze medalist(s)
2019	Welsh Championships (guest)		2nd place, silver medalist(s)	2nd place, silver medalist(s)	2nd place, silver medalist(s)	2nd place, silver medalist(s)	2nd place, silver medalist(s)
2019	English Championships		14				
2019	British Championships		6				
2019	FIT Challenge	4	25				
2019	Junior World Championships	6 (Note: Stacey was the team GBR alternate)					
2019	British Team Championships		2nd place, silver medalist(s)				
2019	Top Gym Tournament	5	12	5			4

Competitive history of Ruby Stacey at the senior level
Year	Event	Team	AA	VT	UB	BB	FX
2021
2021	World Championships		15				
2021	British Championships	3rd place, bronze medalist(s)	1st place, gold medalist(s)				
2022	Koper Challenge Cup				3rd place, bronze medalist(s)		
2022	British Team Championships	3rd place, bronze medalist(s)	2nd place, silver medalist(s)				
2022	Mersin Challenge Cup						5
2023	English Championships		2nd place, silver medalist(s)	2nd place, silver medalist(s)	3rd place, bronze medalist(s)		
2023	Doha World Cup			7			7
2023	Welsh Championships (guest)					3rd place, bronze medalist(s)	
2023	Paris Challenge Cup					8	
2023	Rushmoor Rose Bowl			1st place, gold medalist(s)	1st place, gold medalist(s)		
2024	English Championships		11				
2024	British Championships		7		2nd place, silver medalist(s)		
2024	Antayla Challenge Cup			7			
2025	English Championships		2nd place, silver medalist(s)		1st place, gold medalist(s)		3rd place, bronze medalist(s)
2025	Varna World Challenge Cup			1st place, gold medalist(s)	2nd place, silver medalist(s)		
2025	European Championships	6					
2026	Welsh Championships (open)		1st place, gold medalist(s)				
2026	English Championships		4	2nd place, silver medalist(s)		1st place, gold medalist(s)	5
2026	American Cup	5					
2026	British Championships		2nd place, silver medalist(s)	4	6	2nd place, silver medalist(s)	
2026	Osijek World Cup			5		5	
2026	Commonwealth Games	3rd place, bronze medalist(s)		8			
2026	European Championships	4					
