= Rosalie Hutton =

British artistic gymnast

- Born: 28 December 1989 (age 36)

Gymnastics career
- Discipline: Women's artistic gymnastics
- Country represented: United Kingdom Scotland; (2005 - 2006)
- Club: Pipers Vale Gymnastics Club
- Head coach: Andy Wood
- Retired: October 2006

Rosalie Hutton (b. 1989) is a former gymnast from Terrington St Clement that made her international debut in 2003 later forming part of the Scottish team for the 2006 Commonwealth Games as well as representing Great Britain in other competitions until she retired in 2006. She used to train at Pipers Vale Gymnastics Centre in Ipswich. Rosalie won the GrassRoots Sports Personality of the Year Award at the 2006 Suffolk Sports Awards
