= 2022 Northern European Gymnastics Championships =

International gymnastics competition

- Venue: Jyväskylä Hipposhalli
- Location: Jyväskylä, Finland
- Start date: 19 November 2022
- End date: 20 November 2022

The 2022 Northern European Gymnastics Championships was an artistic gymnastics competition held in Jyväskylä, Finland. The event was held between 19 November and 20 November 2022.

== Medalists ==
Event	Gold	Silver	Bronze
Men
Team all-around	Finland; Akseli Karsikas; Oskar Kirmes; Robert Kirmes; Elias Koski; Joona Reiman; Pavel Titov	Scotland; Cameron Lynn; Euan McLellan; Kyle Millar; Connor Sullivan; David Weir; Ethan Yates	Iceland; Agust Davidsson; Martin Gudmundsson; Dagur Olafsson; Valgard Reinhardsson; Jonas Thorisson; Atli Valgeirsson
Individual all-around	Robert Kirmes (FIN)	Elias Koski (FIN)	Joona Reiman (FIN)
Floor	Robert Kirmes (FIN)	Joona Reiman (FIN)	David Weir (SCO)
Pommel horse	Cameron Lynn (SCO)	Elias Koski (FIN)	Iwan Skrivens (WAL)
Rings	Elias Koski (FIN)	Robert Kirmes (FIN)	Euan McLellan (SCO)
Vault	Joona Reiman (FIN)	Valgard Reinhardsson (ISL)	Liam Jury (ENG)
Parallel bars	Joona Reiman (FIN)	Robert Kirmes (FIN)	Cameron Lynn (SCO)
Horizontal bar	Elias Koski (FIN)	Valgard Reinhardsson (ISL)	Akseli Karsikas (FIN)
Women
Team all-around	Wales; Mia Evans; Ruby Evans; Evie Flage-Donovan; Jea Maracha; Sofia Micallef; Abigail Roper	England; Shanna-Kae Grant; Lucy Lewis; Emily Roper; Lottie Smith; Keira Thornton; Emily Todd	Norway; Julie Erichsen; Selma Halvorsen; Mali Neurauter; Marie Rønbeck; Maria Tronrud; Anna Vik
Individual all-around	Kaia Tanskanen (FIN)	Maria Tronrud (NOR)	Halle Hilton (IRE)
Vault	Ruby Evans (WAL)	Emily Roper (ENG)	Camille Rasmussen (DEN)
Uneven bars	Jea Maracha (WAL) Julie Erichsen (NOR)	—N/a	Sara Loikas (FIN)
Balance beam	Halle Hilton (IRE)	Kaia Tanksanen (FIN)	Ava MacFarlane (SCO)
Floor	Kaia Tanksanen (FIN)	Maria Tronrud (NOR)	Mia Evans (WAL)

== Medal table ==
Rank	Nation	Gold	Silver	Bronze	Total
1	Finland (FIN)	9	6	3	18
2	Wales (WAL)	3	0	2	5
3	Norway (NOR)	1	2	1	4
4	Scotland (SCO)	1	1	4	6
5	Ireland (IRL)	1	0	1	2
6	England (ENG)	0	2	1	3
6	Iceland (ISL)	0	2	1	3
8	Denmark (DEN)	0	0	1	1
Totals (8 entries)		15	13	14	42
