= 2017 Northern European Gymnastics Championships =

International gymnastics competition

- Location: Tórshavn, Faroe Islands
- Start date: 21 October 2017
- End date: 22 October 2017

The 2017 Northern European Gymnastics Championships was an artistic gymnastics competition held in the town of Tórshavn, the capital of the Faroe Islands. The event was held between 21 and 22 October.

== Medalists ==
Event	Gold	Silver	Bronze
Men
Team all-around	Sweden; David Rumbutis; Kim Wanstrøm; Pontus Kallanvaara; Karl Idesjø; Tony Do	Wales; Clinton Purnell; Emil Barber; Benjamin Eyre; Jac Davies; Iwan Mepham	Norway; Odin Kalvø; Henrik Stiansen; Harald Wibye; Pietro Giachino; Nikolai Nilse Roenbeck
Individual all-around	David Rumbutis (SWE)	Odin Kalvø (NOR)	Hamish Carter (SCO)
Floor	Hamish Carter (SCO)	Kasper Rydberg (DEN)	Clinton Purnell (WAL)
Pommel horse	Jac Davies (WAL)	Adam Steele (IRL) Pietro Giachino (NOR)	—N/a
Rings	Karl Idesjø (SWE)	Hamish Carter (SCO)	Daniel Fox (IRL)
Vault	David Rumbutis (SWE)	Joao Marcus Fuglsig (DEN)	Eythor Baldursson (ISL)
Parallel bars	Adam Steele (IRL)	David Rumbutis (SWE)	Iwan Mepham (WAL)
Horizontal bar	Hamish Carter (SCO)	Clinton Purnell (WAL)	Valgard Reinhardsson (ISL) Adam Steele (IRL)
Women
Team all-around	Norway; Julie Erichsen; Ingrid Hafenbrädl; Julie Madsø; Thea Nygaard; Martine Skregelid	Iceland; Thelma Adalsteinsdottir; Dominiqua Belanyi; Sigridur Bergthorsdottir; Irina Sazonova; Agnes Suto-Tuuha	Scotland; Shannon Archer; Cara Kennedy; Sarah McKenzie; Ellie Russell; Isabella Tolometti
Individual all-around	Martine Skregelid (NOR)	Irina Sazonova (ISL)	Thea Nygaard (NOR)
Vault	Marcela Torres (SWE)	Camille Rasmussen (DEN)	Martine Skregelid (NOR)
Uneven bars	Helmi Murto (FIN)	Thelma Adalsteinsdottir (ISL)	Mette Hulgaard (DEN) Lilian Langenskiöld (FIN)
Balance beam	Martine Skregelid (NOR)	Agnes Suto-Tuuha (ISL)	Thea Nygaard (NOR) Maija Leinonen (FIN) Mette Hulgaard (DEN)
Floor	Camille Rasmussen (DEN)	Julie Madsø (NOR) Ida Staafgård (SWE)	—N/a

== Medal table ==
Rank	Nation	Gold	Silver	Bronze	Total
1	Sweden (SWE)	5	2	0	7
2	Norway (NOR)	3	3	4	10
3	Scotland (SCO)	2	1	2	5
4	Denmark (DEN)	1	3	2	6
5	Wales (WAL)	1	2	2	5
6	Ireland (IRL)	1	1	2	4
7	Finland (FIN)	1	0	2	3
8	Iceland (ISL)	0	4	2	6
Totals (8 entries)		14	16	16	46
