= 2026 Northern European Gymnastics Championships =

International gymnastics competition

- Venue: Aalborg Stadium Hall
- Location: Aalborg, Denmark
- Start date: 14 November 2026
- End date: 15 November 2026

The 2026 Northern European Gymnastics Championships was an artistic gymnastics event held at the Aalborg Stadium Hall in Aalborg, Denmark. The event took place between 14 and 15 November 2026.

== Medalists ==
Event	Gold	Silver	Bronze
Men
Team all-around	Iceland; Ágúst Ingi Daviðsson; Martin Bjarni Guðmundsson; Ari Freyr Kristinsson; Dagur Kári Ólafsson; Jónas Ingi Þórisson; Atli Snær Valgeirsson	England; Stanley Cropper; Charlie Harvey-Lloyd; Thomas Phythian; Oliver Porter; Jamiah Richards-Leacock; Jed Solomon	Norway; Emil Kristensen Axberg; Phillip Johan Sandviken Lieske; Ivan Maltsev; Linus Astrup Monen; Brian Rugland; Peder Funderud Skogvang
Individual all-around	(Iceland) Dagur Kári Ólafsson	(Iceland) Ágúst Ingi Daviðsson	(England) Oliver Porter
Floor	(Norway) Peder Funderud Skogvang	(England) Jamiah Richards-Leacock	(Iceland) Ágúst Ingi Daviðsson
Pommel horse	(England) Stanley Cropper	(Wales) Mike Tang	(Iceland) Dagur Kári Ólafsson
Rings	(Iceland) Ágúst Ingi Daviðsson	(Norway) Linus Astrup Monen	(Norway) Peder Funderud Skogvang
Vault	(Wales) Henry Lewis	(England) Thomas Phythian	(Norway) Phillip Johan Sandviken Lieske
Parallel bars	(Iceland) Dagur Kári Ólafsson	(England) Oliver Porter	(Norway) Ágúst Ingi Daviðsson
Horizontal bar	(Iceland) Ágúst Ingi Daviðsson	(Norway) Peder Funderud Skogvang	(Finland) Leo Lehtinen (England) Oliver Porter
Women
Team all-around	England; Ellie Belbin; Emily Burke; Corinna Gooderham; Aaliyah Kalume; Tiegan Trafford; Tilly Wright	Finland; Sara Laiho; Mona Martola; Rosanna Ojala; Ekaterina Podobed; Fanni Varanka; Evelin Veistelehto	Wales; Madi Jones; Annais Kamanga; Ellie Lewis; Roxanne-Nnika Sochon; Jemima Taylor
Individual all-around	(Scotland) Crystelle Lake	(Denmark) Cecilie Bergholt	(England) Tilly Wright
Vault	(England) Ellie Belbin	(Finland) Fanni Varanka	(England) Emily Burke
Uneven bars	(Scotland) Crystelle Lake	(Finland) Ekaterina Podobed	(Wales) Ellie Lewis
Balance beam	(Scotland) Crystelle Lake	(Finland) Sara Laiho	(England) Tilly Wright
Floor	(Norway) Nora Jordhøy (England) Aaliyah Kalume	Not awarded	(England) Emily Burke

== Medal table ==
* Host nation (Denmark)

Rank	Nation	Gold	Silver	Bronze	Total
1	Iceland (ISL)	5	1	2	8
2	England (ENG)	4	4	5	13
3	Scotland (SCO)	3	0	0	3
4	Norway (NOR)	2	2	4	8
5	Wales (WAL)	1	1	2	4
6	Finland (FIN)	0	4	1	5
7	Denmark (DEN)*	0	1	0	1
Totals (7 entries)		15	13	14	42
