= Pipers Vale Gymnastics Club =

British gymnastics club

Coordinates: 52.031249°N 1.188743°E

- Full name: Pipers Vale Gymnastics Club
- Short name: PVGC
- Sport: Artistic gymnastics
- Location: Ipswich, Suffolk
- Home ground: Ipswich Gymnastics Centre
- Colours
- Head coach: Josie Hayes; William Banthorpe
- Members: Abigail Roper; Emily Roper (gymnast)
- Website: www.gymnasticsinipswich.co.uk

Pipers Vale Gymnastics Club is an artistic gymnastics club based at Ipswich Gymnastics Centre in Ipswich. The club was established at the centre when local clubs combined and has trained many British national team members including Emily and Abigail Roper.

The club is coached by Josie Hayes and Will Banthorpe.

== Ipswich gymnastics centre ==
The Ipswich Gymnastic Centre was opened in November 1999 as one of the first purpose-built facilities to benefit from National Lottery funding. It is one of only three fully London Organising Committee for the Olympic Games (LOCOG) accredited gymnastics facilities in the United Kingdom and was used for training sessions in the run up to the 2004 Olympic Games by the Romanian gymnastics team.

=== International competitions ===
The centre has hosted international competitions and friendlies.

==== GB vs. Romania ====
In June 2008, two weeks before selection for the British gymnastics team for the 2008 Summer Olympics were to be announced, the centre held a competition with the 3 time Olympic winning Romania, with Marissa King, Beckie Downie, Rebecca Wing, Hannah Whelan, Lauren Doyle, Laura Jones, Hannah Clowes and Imogen Cairns representing Great Britain. Romania were represented by Steliana Nistor, Sandra Izbaşa, Andreea Acatrinei, Andreea Grigore, Daniela Druncea and Gabriela Drăgoi (Anamaria Tămârjan had to pull out on the day)

== Notable gymnasts ==
=== WAG ===
- Abigail Roper - British national team member, 1 x Commonwealth Games medalist and 4 x Northern European medallist.
- Emily Roper - British national team member, 1 x Commonwealth Games medalist and 4 x Northern European medallist.
- Halle Hilton - Irish national team member, 5 x Northern European medallist and 2 x World Championships competitor.
- Rosalie Hutton - Member of the Scottish 2006 Commonwealth Games team.
- Polina Polyakova - English National Team member

=== MAG ===
- Adam Steele - Irish national team member and 3 x World Championships competitor.
- Charlie Harvey-Lloyd - English national team member.

== Competitive history ==
Competitive history of Pipers Vale at junior women's team competitions
Year	Competition	Team
2017	British Team Championships	8
2018	British Team Championships	6
2019	British Team Championships	14
2024	British Team Championships	9
2025	British Team Championships	18

Competitive history of Pipers Vale at senior women's team competitions
Year	Competition	Team
2019	British Team Championships	17
2022	British Team Championships	3rd place, bronze medalist(s)
2025	British Team Championships	1st place, gold medalist(s)
