= 2023 Northern European Gymnastics Championships =

Artistic gymnastics event in Halmstad, Sweden

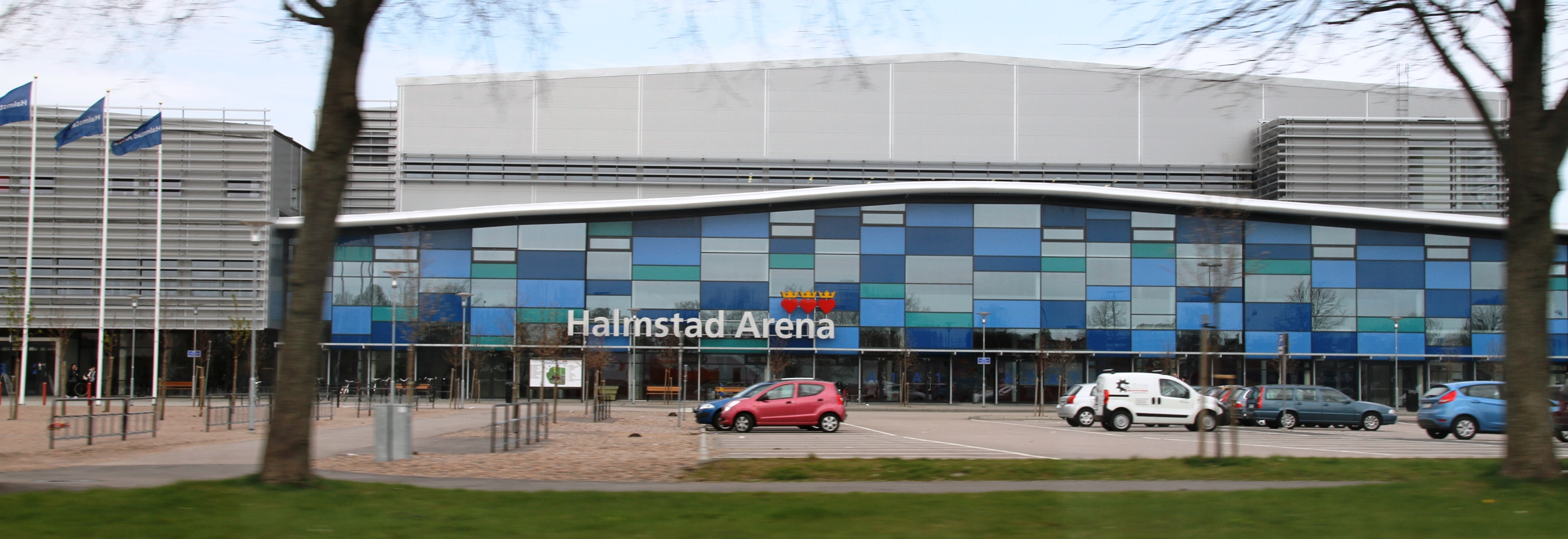
- Venue: Halmstad Arena
- Location: Halmstad, Sweden
- Start date: 24 November 2023
- End date: 26 November 2023

The 2023 Northern European Gymnastics Championships was an artistic gymnastics event held in Halmstad, Sweden. The event took place between 24–26 November 2023.

== Schedule ==
Friday, 24 November 2023

- Orientation Meeting and Open Training

Saturday, 25 November 2023

- 10:50-13:50 — MAG & WAG Sub 1 Competition
- 15:35 — Official Opening Ceremony
- 15:50-18:50 — MAG & WAG Sub 2 Competition
- 19:00 — Team & All-around Award Ceremony

Sunday, 26 November 2023

- 12:05-16:00 — MAG & WAG Apparatus Finals
- Award ceremonies after each apparatus final

== Medalists ==
Event	Gold	Silver	Bronze
Men
Team all-around	Sweden; Luis Il-Sung Melander; Joakim Lenberg; Kim Wanström; William Sundell; Karl Idesjö; Filip Lidbeck	Wales; Joe Cemlyn-Jones; Elliot Vernon; Theo-Amari Ochana; Henry Lewis; Jacob Edwards; Josh Cook)	Finland; Elias Koski; Marcus Pietarinen; Emil Woivalin; Aaro Harju; Anton Jääskeläinen; Niila Sinivuori
Individual all-around	Elias Koski (FIN)	Marcus Pietarinen (FIN)	Joe Cemlyn-Jones (WAL)
Floor	Marcus Pietarinen (FIN)	Hamish Carter (SCO)	Filip Lidbeck (SWE)
Pommel horse	Elias Koski (FIN)	Jake Johnson (ENG)	Reuben Ward (SCO)
Rings	Luis Il-Sung Melander (SWE)	Jacob Gudim Karlsen (NOR)	Joe Cemlyn-Jones (WAL)
Vault	Jacob Gudim Karlsen (NOR)	Henry Lewis (WAL)	Thomas Jones (ENG)
Parallel bars	Elias Koski (FIN)	Valgard Reinhardsson (ISL)	Dagur Kari Olafsson (ISL)
Horizontal bar	Elias Koski (FIN)	Joe Cemlyn-Jones (WAL)	Josh Cook (WAL)
Women
Team all-around	Wales; Ruby Evans; Abigail Roper; Emily Roper; Evie Flage-Donovan; Annais Kamanga; Poppy-Grace Stickler	England; Veronika Kritski; Frances Stone; Tilly Wright; Corinna Gooderham; Lily Davis; Sophie O'Flaherty	Norway; Selma Andrea Halvorsen; Juliane Amalie Tøssebro; Amalie Norvang Dalene; Mari Tideman Kanter; Serina Kvæstad; Aurora Walen Arnesen
Individual all-around	Ruby Evans (WAL)	Veronika Kritski (ENG)	Abigail Roper (WAL)
Vault	Emily Roper (WAL)	Frances Stone (ENG)	Abigail Roper (WAL)
Uneven bars	Thelma Aðalsteinsdóttir (ISL)	Malla Montell (FIN)	Poppy-Grace Stickler (WAL)
Balance beam	Lily Russell (IRE)	Evie Flage-Donovan (WAL)	Nora Hanfelt (SWE)
Floor	Ruby Evans (WAL)	Crystelle Lake (SCO) Mari Tideman Kanter (NOR)	—N/a

== Medal table ==
Rank	Nation	Gold	Silver	Bronze	Total
1	Finland (FIN)	5	2	1	8
2	Wales (WAL)	4	4	6	14
3	Sweden (SWE)	2	0	2	4
4	Norway (NOR)	1	2	1	4
5	Iceland (ISL)	1	1	1	3
6	Ireland (IRL)	1	0	0	1
7	England (ENG)	0	4	1	5
8	Scotland (SCO)	0	2	1	3
Totals (8 entries)		14	15	13	42
