= Abigail Roper =

Welsh artistic gymnast

- Full name: Abigail Charlotte Roper
- Nickname: Abbie
- Born: 7 September 2005 (age 21) Ipswich, England
- Relatives: Emily Roper (sister)

Gymnastics career
- Discipline: Women's artistic gymnastics
- Country represented: Wales (United Kingdom) Great Britain; (2024–present)
- Former countries represented: England
- College team: University of Essex (2025-2027)
- Club: Pipers Vale Gymnastics Club
- Head coaches: Josie Hayes; Rebecca Hambling
Medal record
Women's artistic gymnastics
Representing Great Britain
FIG World Cup
Event	1st	2nd	3rd
World Challenge Cup	0	0	2
Total	0	0	2
Representing Wales
Commonwealth Games
Bronze medal – third place	2026 Glasgow	Vault
Northern European Championships
Gold medal – first place	2023 Halmstad	Team
Gold medal – first place	2022 Jyväskylä	Team
Bronze medal – third place	2023 Halmstad	All-around
Bronze medal – third place	2023 Halmstad	Vault

Abigail Charlotte Roper (born 7 September 2005) is a Welsh Artistic gymnast and member of the British national team. She represented Wales at the 2026 Commonwealth Games where she won bronze on vault.

Roper trains at Pipers Vale Gymnastics Club alongside her twin sister Emily Roper who is also an artistic gymnast.

== Early life and education ==
Roper attended Copleston High School in Ipswich alongside her sister, Emily. In 2025 Roper and her sister began studying Sports and Exercise Science at the University of Essex, on the Colchester campus. Born in England, she is of Welsh descent.

== Senior gymnastics career ==
=== 2022 ===
Roper switched to the Welsh national team and competed at her first Northern European Championships in Jyväskylä, where Wales finished first in the team competition.

=== 2023 ===
At her first Welsh Championships Roper won silver on vault and finished seventh in the all-around.

She competed at the 2023 Leverkusen Cup alongside her sister, Emily Roper. The duo placed second in the team competition and individually Roper won gold on vault and placed fourth in the all-around.

Roper was selected to compete at the 2023 Northern European Gymnastics Championships in Halmstad alongside Ruby Evans, Poppy-Grace Stickler, Evie Flage-Donovan, Annais Kamanga and her sister Emily Roper. She helped Wales win the team competition and individually won bronze in the all-around and on vault.

=== 2024 ===
At the 2024 Welsh Championships Roper won silver in the all-around behind Ruby Evans and ahead of her sister. She also won gold on balance beam, silver on uneven bars and bronze on vault. Later at British Championships Roper placed tenth in the all-around, and finished fourth in the balance beam and floor apparatus finals.

Roper then competed at the 2024 Szombathely Challenge Cup alongside Charlotte Booth. She made vault and balance beam finals, placing fourth and eighth respectively.

=== 2025 ===
At Welsh Championships Roper competed only on beam where she won bronze. At the 2025 British Championships Roper finished 14th in the all-around and won bronze on vault.

Roper attended the Koper Challenge Cup where she made the vault, uneven bars and floor exercise finals. She won bronze on vault and floor exercise, and placed 5th on uneven bars.

=== 2026 ===
Roper competed in the all-around competition at Welsh Championships, winning gold in the national competition and bronze in the open competition. She was named in the Welsh team for the 2026 Commonwealth Games alongside Ruby Evans, Frances Stone, Jemima Taylor and her sister Emily Roper. Roper helped the team finish fourth and individually qualified to the vault final. She made history by picking up a bronze medal on vault, the same day as her sister Emily Roper won bronze on uneven bars.

== Competitive record ==
Competitive history of Abigail Roper
Year	Event	Team	AA	VT	UB	BB	FX
2018	British Team Championships (junior)		26				
2019	English Championships (junior)		38				
2019	British Team Championships (junior)		19				
2021	British Championships		14	5			
2022	English Championships		22				
2022	British Championships		25				
2022	British Team Championships	3rd place, bronze medalist(s)	4			3rd place, bronze medalist(s)	
2022	Northern European Championships	1st place, gold medalist(s)	10	5			4
2023	Welsh Championships		7	2nd place, silver medalist(s)			
2023	British Championships		17	7			
2023	Leverkusen Cup	2nd place, silver medalist(s)	4	1st place, gold medalist(s)			
2023	Northern European Championships	1st place, gold medalist(s)	3rd place, bronze medalist(s)	3rd place, bronze medalist(s)	5		
2024	Welsh Championships		2nd place, silver medalist(s)	3rd place, bronze medalist(s)	2nd place, silver medalist(s)	1st place, gold medalist(s)	
2024	English Championships (guest)		3rd place, bronze medalist(s)	2nd place, silver medalist(s)	3rd place, bronze medalist(s)		3rd place, bronze medalist(s)
2024	British Championships		10	5		4	4
2024	Szombathely World Challenge Cup			4		8	8
2024	Rushmoor Rose Bowl		4				
2025	Welsh Championships					3rd place, bronze medalist(s)	
2025	British Championships		14	3rd place, bronze medalist(s)			
2025	Koper World Challenge Cup			3rd place, bronze medalist(s)	5		3rd place, bronze medalist(s)
2026	Welsh Championships		1st place, gold medalist(s)	2nd place, silver medalist(s)	1st place, gold medalist(s)		
2026	Welsh Championships (open)		3rd place, bronze medalist(s)				
2026	Commonwealth Games	4		3rd place, bronze medalist(s)			
2026	Szombathely World Challenge Cup						
