= Jessica Gadirova =

British artistic gymnast (born 2004)

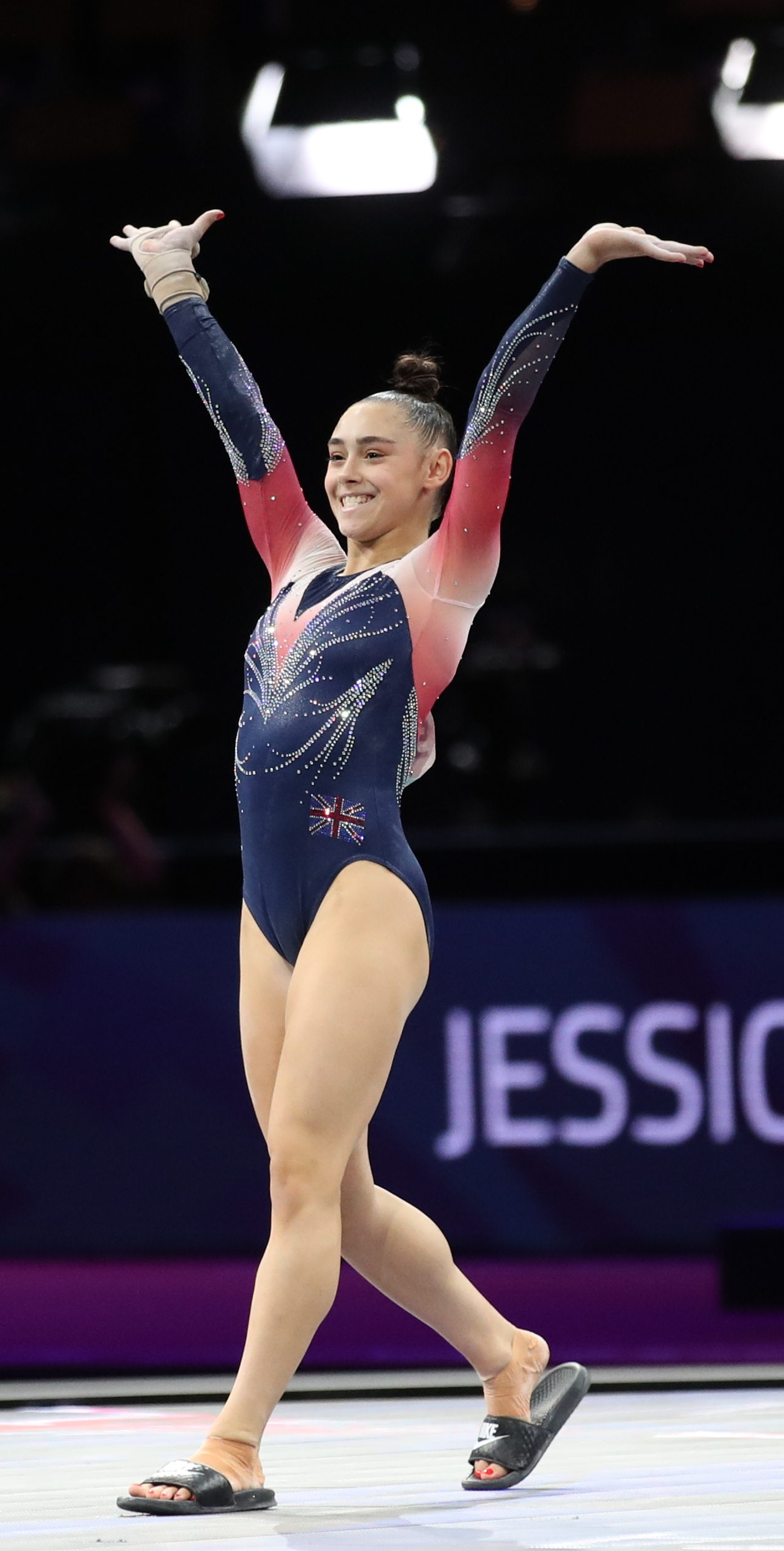
- Gadirova at the 2022 European Championships

Personal information
- Born: 3 October 2004 (age 22) Dublin, Ireland
- Relatives: Jennifer Gadirova

Gymnastics career
- Discipline: Women's artistic gymnastics
- Country represented: (United Kingdom) Great Britain; (2019–present)
- Club: Lynx Aylesbury
- Head coaches: Molly Richardson, Joshua Richardson
- Awards: See awards
Medal record
Women's artistic gymnastics
Representing Great Britain
Olympic Games
Bronze medal – third place	2020 Tokyo	Team
World Championships
Gold medal – first place	2022 Liverpool	Floor Exercise
Silver medal – second place	2022 Liverpool	Team
Bronze medal – third place	2022 Liverpool	All-Around
European Championships
Gold medal – first place	2021 Basel	Floor Exercise
Gold medal – first place	2022 Munich	Floor Exercise
Gold medal – first place	2023 Antalya	Team
Gold medal – first place	2023 Antalya	All-Around
Gold medal – first place	2023 Antalya	Floor Exercise
Silver medal – second place	2021 Basel	Vault
Silver medal – second place	2022 Munich	Team
Bronze medal – third place	2021 Basel	All-Around

Jessica Gadirova OLY (born 3 October 2004) is an English artistic gymnast of Irish birth and Azerbaijani descent, representing Great Britain internationally. She represented Great Britain at the 2020 Summer Olympics and won a bronze medal in the team event and was part of the silver medal-winning team at the 2022 World Championships and gold medal-winning team at the 2023 European Artistic Gymnastics Championships.

Individually, she is the 2022 World champion on floor exercise, the second British female and third Briton to win a World title on the apparatus (after Beth Tweddle and Giarnni Regini-Moran) as well as a three-time European champion on the same event (in 2021, 2022 and 2023). She is the first female gymnast to win three successive floor titles at the European Artistic Gymnastics Championships, and the first of either sex since Franco Menichelli (1941–2026) in 1965.

She is the 2023 European all-around champion, the second Briton after Ellie Downie to achieve that feat, and the 2022 World and 2021 European all-around bronze medallist. Additionally she is the 2021 European vault silver medallist. Gadirova became the first female gymnast to win three gold medals at the same European Championships since Cătălina Ponor for Romania in 2004, and the first to win the all-around title in doing so since Svetlana Khorkina for Russia in 2002.

She competed at the inaugural 2019 Junior World Championships alongside her twin sister, Jennifer. She was the first Irish-born gymnast to win a gymnastics World title in 2022; Rhys McClenaghan won the first gold medal for Ireland days later.

Domestically, Gadirova is a three-time English and three-time British champion.

== Personal life ==
Gadirova and her identical twin sister Jennifer were born in Dublin, Ireland, and are of Azerbaijani descent. Their father, Natig Gadirov, and their mother are from Azerbaijan and emigrated to London in 2001. Gadirova was born in Ireland while her parents worked there for a few months before returning to England. As a result, she has Azerbaijani, Irish and British citizenship. Her paternal grandparents live in Baku: her grandmother is a retired paediatrician, and her grandfather is a professor in physics and mathematics. Gadirova and her sister began gymnastics at six years old because their mother wanted them to have an outlet for their energy.

== Junior gymnastics career ==
=== Espoir: 2016 ===
In March, Gadirova competed at the British Espoir Championships, where she placed 12th in the all-around and sixth on balance beam.

=== Junior: 2018–19 ===
In February 2018, Gadirova competed at the English Championships, where she placed 23rd. The following month she competed at the British Championships, where she placed seventh in the all-around, eighth on uneven bars, and sixth on floor exercise. She ended the season competing at the British Team Championships, where she placed 11th in the junior non-squad all-around.

In March 2019, Gadirova competed at the English Championships, where she placed fourth behind Ondine Achampong, Halle Hilton, and Jennifer Gadirova. Later that month, she competed at the British Championships, where she placed seventh in the all-around, eighth on vault, fourth on uneven bars, and won bronze on floor exercise. Gadirova next competed at the Flanders International Team Challenge, where she finished third in the all-around behind Romanians Ioana Stănciulescu and Silviana Sfiringu and helped Great Britain finish fourth as a team.

In June, Gadirova competed at the inaugural Junior World Championships in Győr, Hungary, alongside her twin sister Jennifer and Alia Leat. In the team final, they finished in sixth place and individually Gadirova finished 33rd in the all-around.

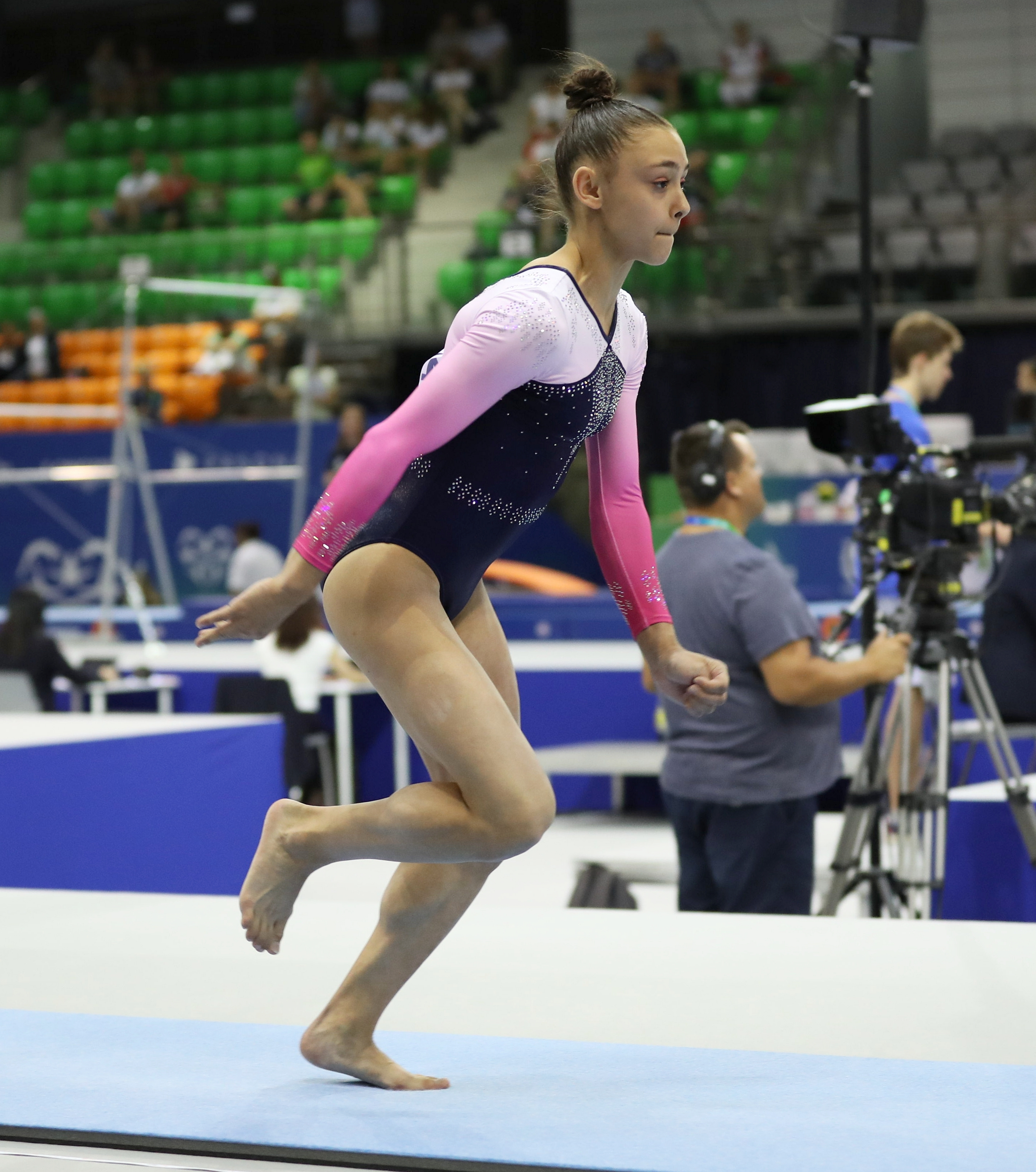
Vault

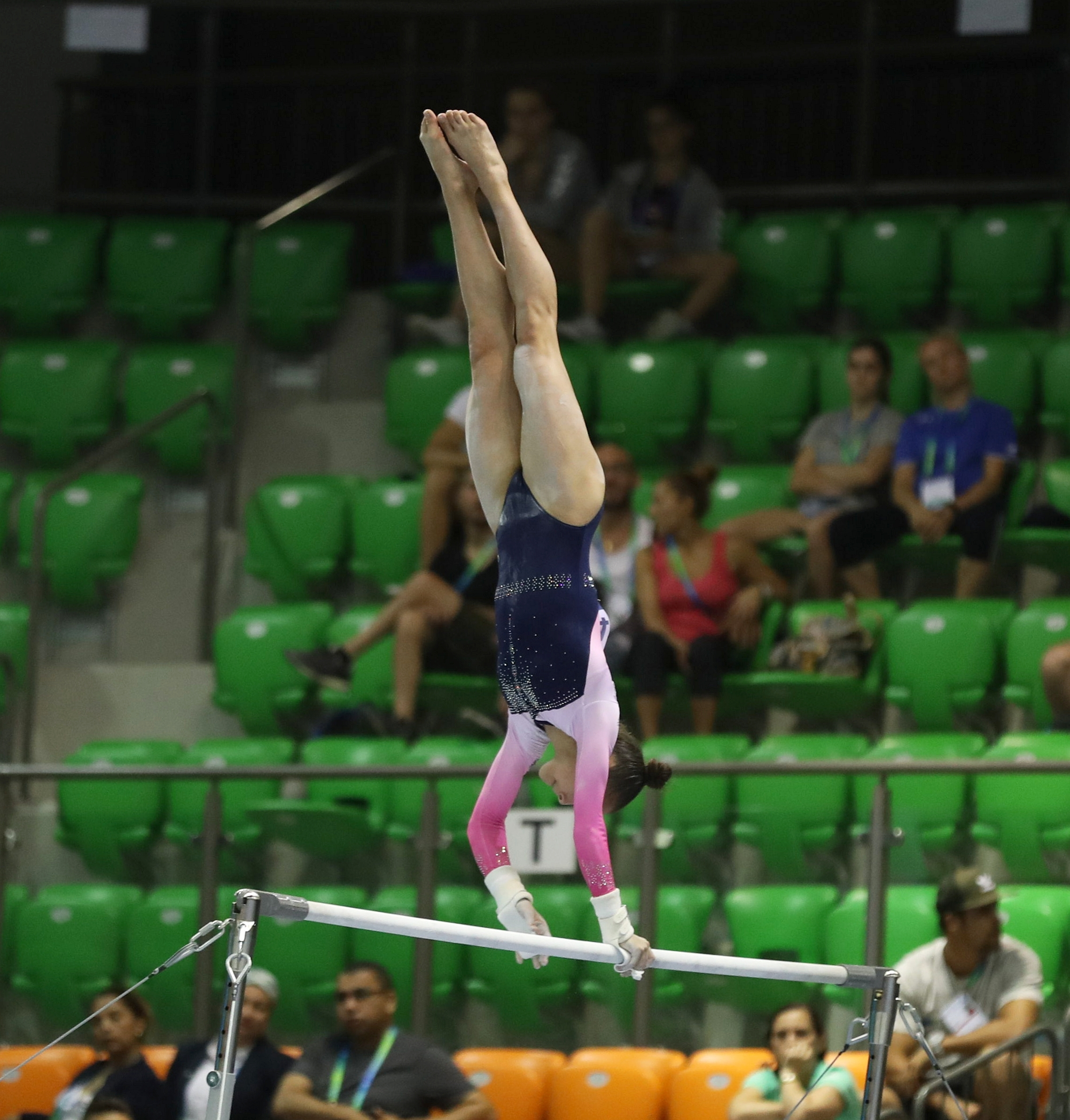
Uneven bars

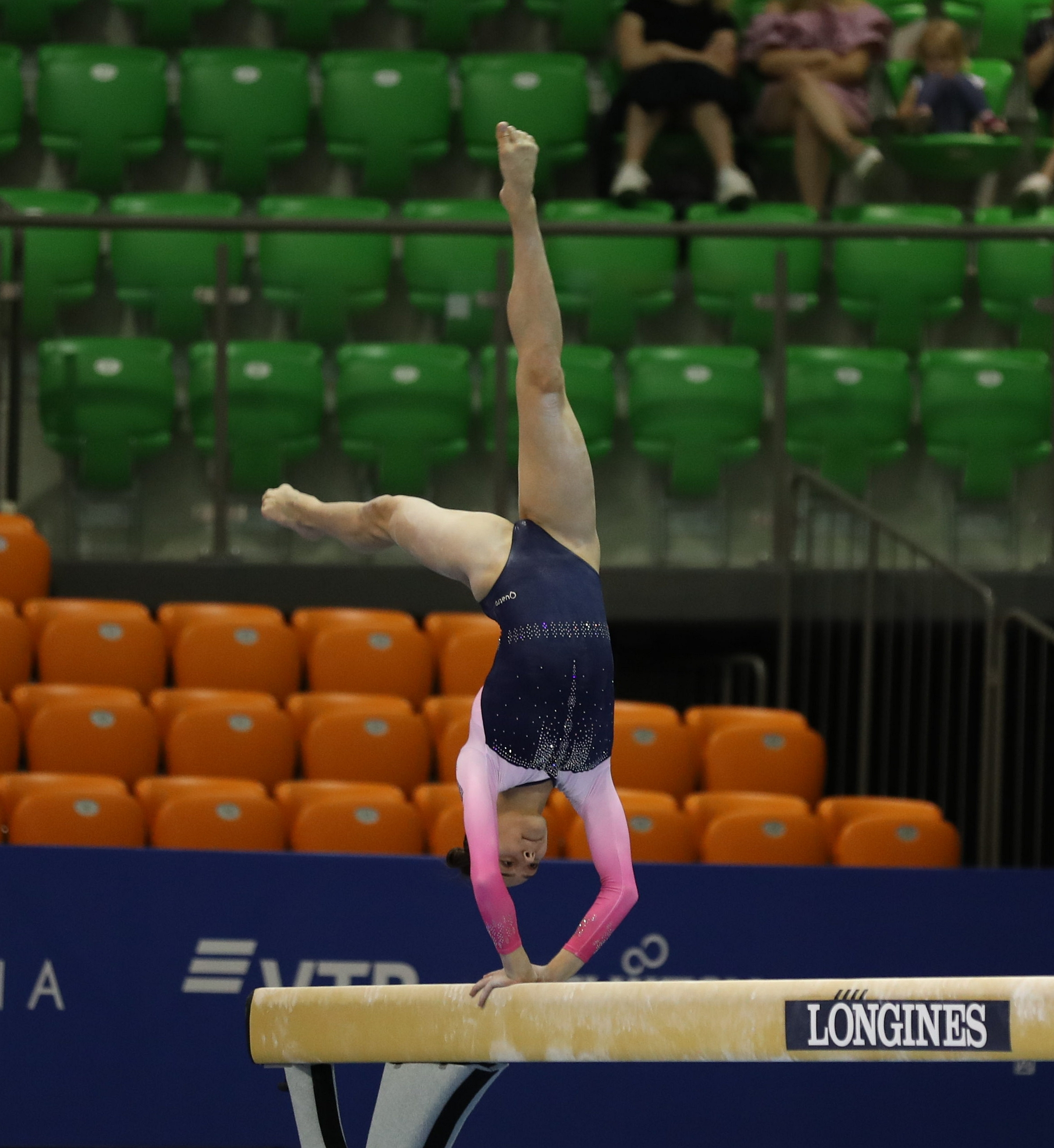
Balance beam

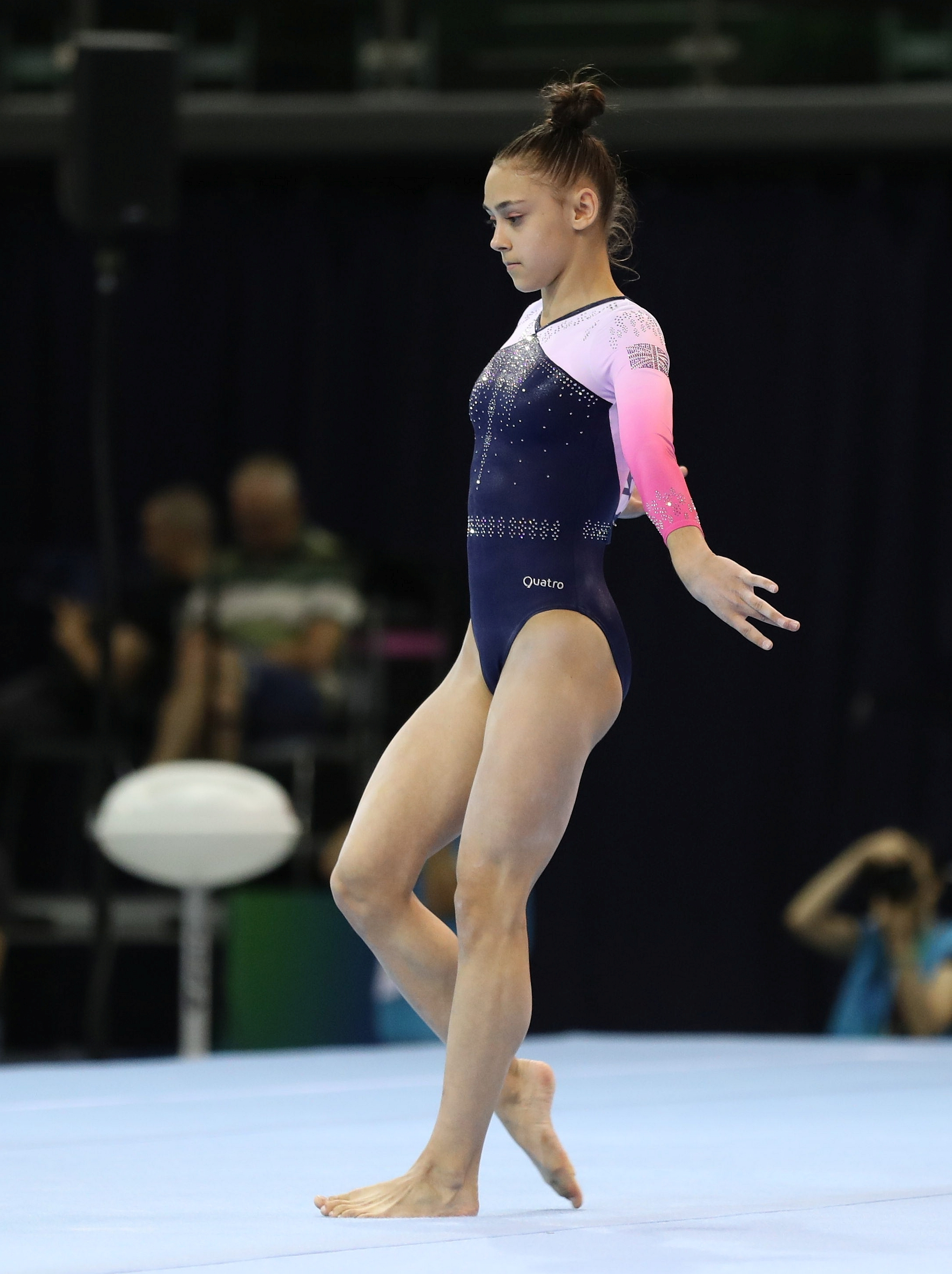
Floor exercise

Gadirova at the 2019 Junior World Championships

In July, Gadirova competed at the Sainté Gym Cup, where she helped Great Britain win team gold. In September, she competed at the 2019 Women's British Teams Championships, finishing first in the junior all-around, ahead of her sister. Additionally, she helped Aylesbury finish first as a team.

== Senior gymnastics career ==
=== 2021 ===
Gadirova turned senior in 2020, but did not compete due to the worldwide COVID-19 pandemic. In April 2021, she was selected to represent Great Britain at the European Championships alongside her twin sister Jennifer (later replaced by Phoebe Jakubczyk), Alice Kinsella, and Amelie Morgan. During qualifications, Gadirova qualified to the all-around final, despite suffering a hard fall off of the balance beam. Additionally, Gadirova qualified to the vault final in first place and the floor exercise final in third place. In the all-around final Gadirova won the bronze medal behind Russians Viktoria Listunova and Angelina Melnikova. She is the second British female artistic gymnast after Ellie Downie to win an all-around medal at the European Championships. During the vault final, Gadirova finished second behind Olympic and World vault medalist Giulia Steingruber. On the final day of the competition, Gadirova won gold on floor exercise ahead of Melnikova and former world all-around champion Vanessa Ferrari, making her the first British floor exercise champion since Beth Tweddle won in 2010.

On 7 June, Gadirova was selected to represent Great Britain at the 2020 Summer Olympics alongside her twin sister Jennifer, Alice Kinsella, and Amelie Morgan. At the Olympic Games, Gadirova qualified to the all-around and floor exercise finals; additionally, Great Britain qualified for the team final. During the team final, Gadirova performed on vault, uneven bars, and floor exercise, hitting all of her routines and helping Great Britain win the bronze medal, their first Olympic team medal in 93 years. During the all-around final Gadirova fell off the balance beam, but still finished tenth place overall. In doing so, she became the highest placing British gymnast in an Olympic all-around final, surpassing Becky Downie's 12th-place finish in 2008. During the floor exercise event final Gadirova performed a clean routine and earned a score of 14.000, finishing in sixth place.

In December 2021, Gadirova became a brand ambassador for gymnastics leotard manufacturer Milano Pro-Sport.

=== 2022 ===
In March, Gadirova competed at the English Championships, where she won the all-around and also took gold on vault and floor.

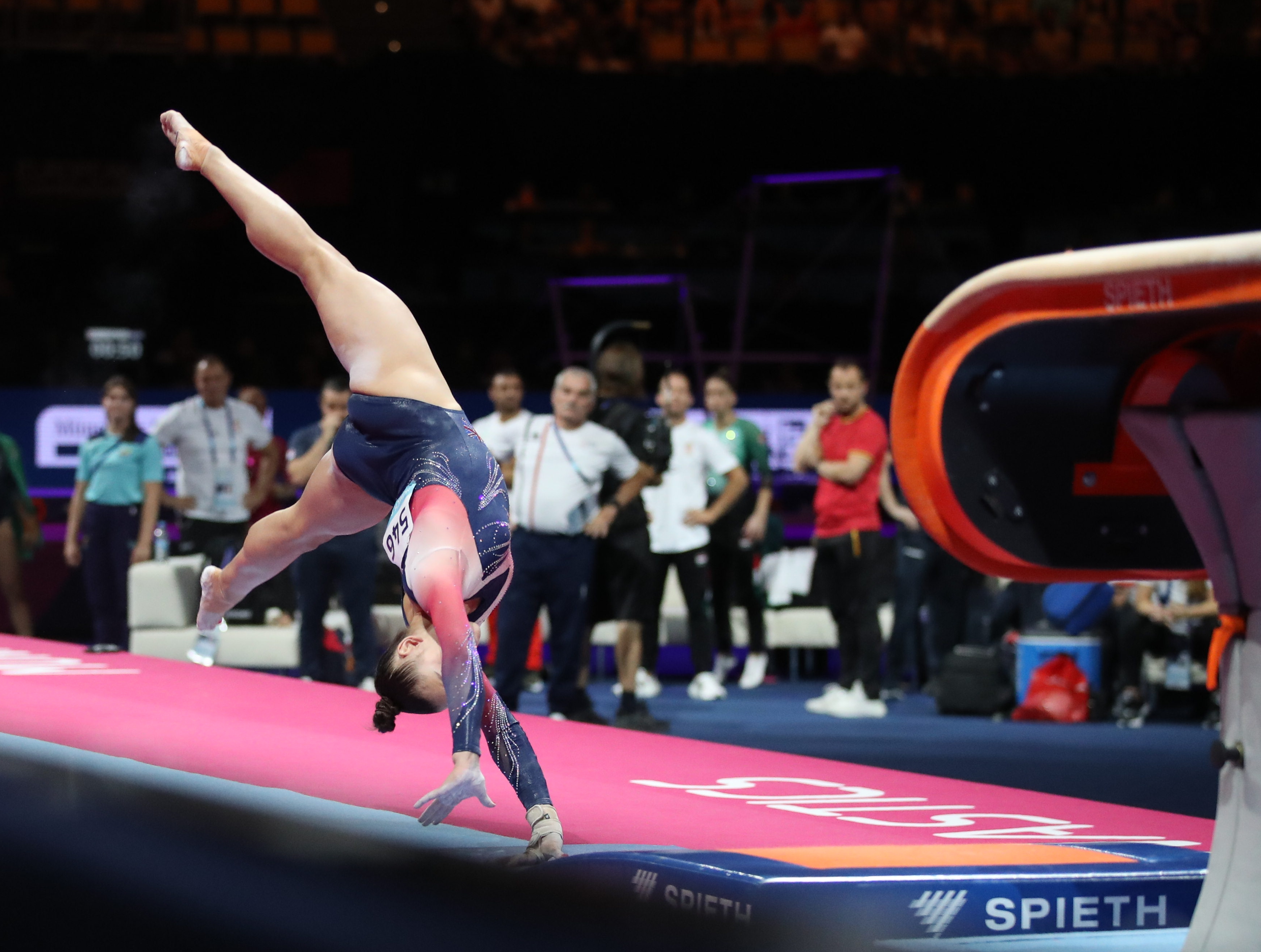
Gadirova vaulting at the 2022 European Championships

Later that month, Gadirova competed at the British Championships in Liverpool, where she took gold in the all-around with a score of 54.650, ahead of her Aylesbury teammates Ondine Achampong and her sister Jennifer. She then went on to win gold on vault and floor as well as silver on beam. In July, Gadirova was selected to compete at the European Championships alongside her sister Jennifer, Achampong, Georgia-Mae Fenton, and Alice Kinsella. In August, Gadriova competed at the European Championships. She contributed scores on vault and floor exercise towards Great Britain's second-place finish. During event finals, Gadirova won gold on floor exercise for the second consecutive year. Gadirova was also named Gymnast of the Year 2021 by European Gymnastics, alongside Boryana Kaleyn and Ferhat Arıcan.

In September, Gadirova was named to the team to compete at the 2022 World Championships, once again alongside her twin sister Jennifer, Achampong, Kinsella, and Fenton. She helped Great Britain qualify to the team final, and individually, she qualified to the all-around, vault, and floor exercise finals. During the team final, Gadirova competed on vault, uneven bars, and floor exercise, helping Great Britain win the silver medal and achieve their highest placement at a World Championships. Additionally, Gadirova posted the highest floor exercise score of the competition. During the all-around final Gadirova placed third behind Rebeca Andrade and Shilese Jones, earning Great Britain's first World all-around medal. Gadirova withdrew from the vault final. On the last day of competition, she competed in the floor exercise final. She was the last competitor to compete and earned a score 14.200 to win the title. She became the second British woman to win the floor exercise title after Beth Tweddle did so in 2009. Gadirova was the second British gymnast to win a gold medal at these World Championships after Giarnni Regini-Moran won the men's floor exercise title the previous day. At only 18 years and 34 days old, Gadirova became the youngest British gymnast to become a World Champion. Due to her performances at the World Championships, Gadirova was named Sunday Times Young Sportswoman of the Year and additionally won the Sports Journalists' Association Peter Wilson Trophy for international newcomer, alongside fellow British gymnast Jake Jarman. In December, she won the BBC Young Sports Personality of the Year award.

=== 2023–2024 ===
Gadirova competed at the English Championships, where she placed fourth on uneven bars. She was named to the team to compete at the upcoming European Championships, alongside Becky Downie, Georgia-Mae Fenton, Ondine Achampong, and Alice Kinsella.

At the European Championships, Gadirova helped Great Britain win their first team gold medal. Additionally, she qualified to the all-around, balance beam, and floor exercise finals in first place. During the all-around final, Gadirova scored 55.032 to win gold ahead of Zsófia Kovács and Alice D'Amato. During apparatus finals, Gadirova finished seventh on balance beam following a fall on dismount, but won her third consecutive title, and third gold of the championships on floor exercise.

In September, Gadirova was selected to represent Great Britain at the 2023 World Championships alongside Kinsella, Achampong, Fenton, and Ruby Evans. She helped the British team to second place in qualifications as well as qualifying to the individual all-around, vault, balance beam, and floor exercise finals. But in the team final, where Gadirova contributed on all four events, the team was unable to reach the same level as they did in qualifications and finished sixth. On the day of the individual all-around event, British Gymnastics, in a surprise announcement, said that Gadirova had withdrawn from the all-around competition as a "precautionary measure" after she felt some pain during training and was replaced by teammate Kinsella. The following day, she withdrew from all other event finals. On 15 October, Gadirova posted on her Instagram account that her withdrawal from the individual all-around was because she had suffered a full tear of her anterior cruciate ligament in which she described as a "freak accident" whilst performing a gymnastics prep skill in training. The injury ended her 2023 season and kept Gadirova inactive through 2024, meaning she missed the 2024 Summer Olympics.

A month following the 2024 Olympic Games, Gadirova announced that she had been cleared by her surgeon to resume training.

=== 2025 ===
Gadirova returned to competition at the English Championships on 2 March 2025, 513 days after she last competed. She only competed on the balance beam, on which she won the silver medal. Later that month, she competed at the British Championships, only competing on the uneven bars and balance beam. She won silver on the former. She made her return to international competition at the Paris World Challenge Cup in September 2025 where she competed on uneven bars and balance beam. She qualified to the uneven bars final where she ultimately placed fifth. Gadirova was initially selected to represent Great Britain at the 2025 World Championships; however an injury setback caused her to withdraw.

== Selected competitive skills ==
Apparatus	Name	Description	Difficulty (Note: Valid for the 2021-2024 Code of Points)	Performed
Vault	López	Yurchenko half-on entry, laid out salto forwards with ½ twist	4.8	2021–22
Vault	Baitova	Yurchenko entry, laid out salto backwards with two twists	5.0	2021–23
Vault	Cheng	Yurchenko half-on entry, laid out salto forwards with 1.5 twists	5.6	2023
Uneven Bars	Van Leeuwen	Toe-on Shaposhnikova transition with ½ twist to high bar	E	2021–22
Uneven Bars	Tweddle	Toe-on Tkatchev with ½ turn	D	2021
Balance Beam	Double pike	Dismount: Double piked salto backwards	E	2021–23
Floor Exercise	Mukhina	Full-twisting (1/1) double tucked salto backwards	E	2021
Floor Exercise	Double Layout	Double laid out salto backwards	F	2021–23
Floor Exercise	Chusovitina	Full-twisting (1/1) double laid out salto backwards	H	2022-23
Floor Exercise	Silivas	Double-twisting (2/1) double tucked salto backwards	H	2021–23
Floor Exercise	Moors	Double-twisting (2/1) double laid out salto backwards	I	2023

== Competitive history ==
Competitive history of Jessica Gadirova at the junior level
Year	Event	Team	AA	VT	UB	BB	FX
2016	British Espoir Championships		12			6	
2018	English Championships		23				
2018	British Championships		7		8		6
2018	British Team Championships	3rd place, bronze medalist(s)	11				
2019	English Championships		4				
2019	British Championships		7	8	4		3rd place, bronze medalist(s)
2019	FIT Challenge	4	3rd place, bronze medalist(s)				
2019	Junior World Championships	6					
2019	Sainté Gym Cup	1st place, gold medalist(s)	7				
2019	British Team Championships	1st place, gold medalist(s)	1st place, gold medalist(s)				

Competitive history of Jessica Gadirova at the senior level
Year	Event	Team	AA	VT	UB	BB	FX
2021
2021	European Championships		3rd place, bronze medalist(s)	2nd place, silver medalist(s)			1st place, gold medalist(s)
2021	Olympic Games	3rd place, bronze medalist(s)	10				6
2022	English Championships		1st place, gold medalist(s)	1st place, gold medalist(s)	4	4	1st place, gold medalist(s)
2022	British Championships		1st place, gold medalist(s)	1st place, gold medalist(s)		2nd place, silver medalist(s)	1st place, gold medalist(s)
2022	European Championships	2nd place, silver medalist(s)	10	5			1st place, gold medalist(s)
2022	World Championships	2nd place, silver medalist(s)	3rd place, bronze medalist(s)	WD			1st place, gold medalist(s)
2023	British Championships				4	2nd place, silver medalist(s)	
2023	European Championships	1st place, gold medalist(s)	1st place, gold medalist(s)			7	1st place, gold medalist(s)
2023	World Championships	6	WD	WD		WD	WD
2025	English Championships					2nd place, silver medalist(s)	
2025	British Championships				2nd place, silver medalist(s)		
2025	Paris World Challenge Cup				5		

== Awards ==
Year	Award	Result	Ref
2021	European Gymnast of the Year	Won	
2022	Sunday Times Young Sportswomen of the Year	Won	
2022	SJA Peter Wilson Trophy	Won	
2022	BBC Young Sports Personality of the Year	Won	
2022	BBC Sports Personality of the Year	Nominated	
