= Copleston High School =

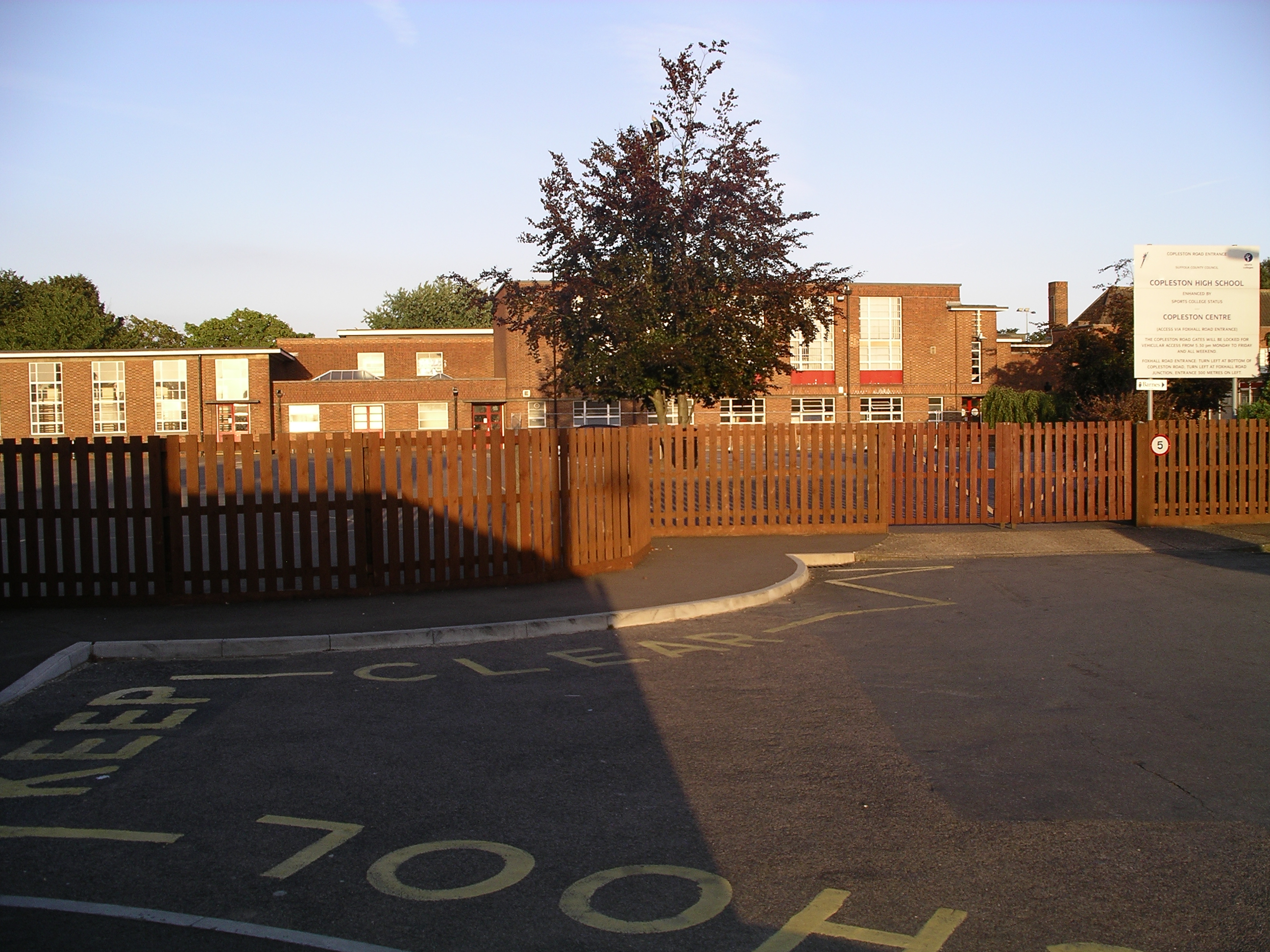

Location
- Copleston Road; Ipswich, Suffolk, IP4 5HD; England; 52°03′16″N 1°11′39″E

Information
- Type: Sports Academy
- Motto: Achieving Success Together
- Established: 1939
- Department for Education URN: 136827 Tables
- Ofsted: Reports
- Principal: A. Green
- Gender: Coeducational
- Age: 11 to 18
- Enrolment: 1768
- Website: http://www.copleston.suffolk.sch.uk/

Copleston High School is a secondary school for ages 11–18 in Ipswich, England. It is an academy, and caters for around 1,800 students, as well as between 340 and 370 students in the sixth form which was shared with Holywells High School until 2011. A 2009 Ofsted inspection rated its overall performance as good with outstanding features. A following Ofsted inspection in 2018 awarded them with a 'good' rating.

== History ==
The school first opened in 1939 as two separate boys' and girls' secondary modern schools. However soon afterwards, World War II was declared and the site was used as a hospital for the duration of the War.

=== 2006 arson attack ===
A severe fire on 27 August 2006 damaged the school's gym, classrooms and staff room, which prevented many students from returning after the summer break while repairs were being carried out. In January 2007, former pupil Ashley Norman pleaded guilty at Ipswich Crown Court to starting the fire, whilst a second boy denied the charges. They were both found guilty of arson and charged with 3 and 4 years respectively in a young offenders institution.

Two separate fires were started on site, the first in the staff block of the main building and the second in the girls' gym where a trampoline was set alight. For a time the school used an old air raid siren to signify the end of classes after the fire destroyed the old bell system.

=== Allegations about suspended teacher ===
In May 2013, Stephen Benson, a former science and PE teacher at Copleston was sentenced to 16 years’ imprisonment after being found guilty of 21 offences, including nine rapes, six indecent assaults, two sex assaults and two counts of sexual activity with a child. Another former teacher, Stephen Brenchley, was also convicted of sexual assault of a 15-year-old girl.

== Gippeswyk Community Educational Trust ==
Copleston High School is a part of the Gippeswyk Community Educational Trust - also known as GCET (A multi-academy trust.) The trust comprises Copleston High School, Britannia Primary School and Rosehill Primary School - all in the locality of East Ipswich. Previous Principal, Shaun Common, has now assumed the role of chief executive officer of the trust.

== Enterprise ==
In 2007 a scheme by students to run a "juice bar" selling smoothies in cooperation with a local firm earned one of the students the title of East of England Student of the Year and attracted interest from other schools in the county. The juice bar subsequently closed due to the closure of the company behind the idea. A coffee bar stands in its place today.

== Notable alumni ==
- Andre Dozzell, footballer
- Scott Nicholls, international speedway rider
- Robin Windsor, professional dancer
- Emily Roper, international artistic gymnast
- Abigail Roper, international artistic gymnast
