= Martine Skregelid =

Norwegian artistic gymnast

- Full name: Martine Rustøen Skregelid
- Born: 6 July 1999 (age 27) Bærum, Norway
- Height: 160 cm (5 ft 3 in)

Gymnastics career
- Discipline: Women's artistic gymnastics
- Country represented: Norway
- Club: Asker Gymnastics Club
- Head coaches: Joanna Uracz, Cosmina Zimcencu, Valentin Pintea
Medal record
Representing Norway
Northern European Championships
Gold medal – first place	2017 Tórshavn	Team
Gold medal – first place	2017 Tórshavn	All-around
Gold medal – first place	2017 Tórshavn	Balance beam
Silver medal – second place	2014 Greve	Balance beam
Bronze medal – third place	2013 Lisburn	Balance beam
Bronze medal – third place	2014 Greve	Floor exercise
Bronze medal – third place	2017 Tórshavn	Vault

Martine Rustøen Skregelid (born 6 July 1999) is a Norwegian former artistic gymnast. She won three gold medals at the 2017 Northern European Championships. She represented her country in the 2014 Youth Olympic Games and the 2015 European Games.

== Gymnastics career ==
=== Junior ===
Skregelid won a bronze medal on the balance beam at the 2013 Northern European Championships. She competed with the Norwegian team that finished 16th at the 2014 Junior European Championships. She then represented Norway at the 2014 Summer Youth Olympics and finished 20th in the all-around qualifications, making her the second reserve for the final. Additionally, she was the second reserve for the balance beam. At the 2014 Northern European Championships, she won a silver medal on the balance beam behind Latalia Bevan, and she won a bronze medal on the floor exercise behind Angel Romaeo and Maisie Methuen.

=== Senior ===
Skregelid became age-eligible for senior competitions in 2015. She competed with the Norwegian team that finished 23rd at the 2015 European Games. She won her first national all-around title at the 2015 Norwegian Championships and was selected to compete at the World Championships. There, she finished 170th in the all-around qualification round.

Skregelid competed at the 2017 European Championships and finished 44th in the all-around qualification round, missing out on the final by 1.874 points. She tied with Thea Nygaard for the all-around title at the 2017 Norwegian Championships. She then competed at the 2017 World Championships and finished 55th in the all-around during the qualification round. After the World Championships, she competed at the 2017 Northern European Championships in Tórshavn alongside Ingrid Hafenbrädl, Julie Madsø, Thea Nygaard, and Julie Erichsen where they won the team gold medal. Additionally, Skregelid won the all-around title by nearly a point ahead of Irina Sazonova. Then in the event finals, she won a bronze medal on the vault and a gold medal on the balance beam.
