= Frances Stone =

Welsh artistic gymnast

- Full name: Frances Stone
- Nickname: Frank
- Born: 21 December 2009 (age 16)

Gymnastics career
- Discipline: Women's artistic gymnastics
- Country represented: Wales (2024–present) (United Kingdom) Great Britain (2025–present)
- Former countries represented: England (2022–2023)
- Club: Amber Valley Gymnastics Academy
Medal record
Representing England
Northern European Championships
Silver medal – second place	2023 Halmstad	Team
Silver medal – second place	2023 Halmstad	Vault

Frances 'Frank' Stone (born 21 December 2009) is a Welsh artistic gymnast and British national team member. As a senior she was balance beam champion at the 2025 British Gymnastics Championships and represented Great Britain at the 2025 European Championships.

Stone trains at Amber Valley Gymnastics Academy.

== Junior gymnastics career ==
=== Espoir: 2021–2022 ===
At the 2022 English Championships, Stone placed 5th in the all-around competition.

=== Junior: 2023–2024 ===
In her first year as a junior, Stone placed 36th in the all-around at the 2023 English Championships. She was named in the team selected to represent England at the 2023 Northern European Gymnastics Championships in Sweden, she won silver in the team competition and on vault, as well as finishing seventh in the individual all-around.

At the 2024 Welsh Championships Stone won silver on vault and placed seventh in the all-around. Later at English Championships she won silver on floor exercise, bronze on vault and placed sixth in the all-around. At the 2024 British Championships, Stone won silver on balance beam, bronze on vault and placed 5th in the all-around.

== Senior gymnastics career ==
=== 2025 ===
Stone competed at the 2025 Welsh Championships as a first year senior, winning silver in the all-around behind Ruby Evans. She also won gold on balance beam, silver on uneven bars and bronze on floor exercise. Later that month at the 2025 English Championships Stone competed in the guest competition, winning silver in the all-around alongside gold on balance beam, silver on floor exercise and bronze on uneven bars. Stone went on to be named balance beam champion at the 2025 British Gymnastics Championships and also won silver in the all-around and on vault.

Stone was selected to represent Great Britain alongside Ema Kandalova, Shantae-Eve Amanakwaah, Tilly Wright and Grace Davies at the DTB Pokal Team Challenge in Stuttgart where the team won bronze.

She was selected for her first senior major international championships as part of the British squad for the 2025 European Championships alongside Alia Leat, Emily Roper, Ruby Evans and Ruby Stacey. At 15 years, 5 months and 5 days Stone was the youngest competitor in the competition. She competed in the all-around and helped the team place sixth.

=== 2026 ===
At Welsh Championships Stone competed only on balance beam, winning gold. At British Championships Stone competed in the all-around where she placed 16th. She also qualified for the balance beam and floor exercise finals where she won bronze and placed 7th respectively. Stone was named in the Welsh team for the 2026 Commonwealth Games alongside Ruby Evans, Jemima Taylor, Emily Roper and Abigail Roper. She helped the team finish fourth.

== Competitive history ==
Competitive history of Frances Stone at the junior level
Year	Event	Team	AA	VT	UB	BB	FX
Representing England & Great Britain
2022	English Championships		5				
2023	English Championships		36				
2023	Northern European Championships	2nd place, silver medalist(s)	7	2nd place, silver medalist(s)			
Representing Wales & Great Britain
2024	Welsh Championships		7	2nd place, silver medalist(s)			
2024	English Championships (guest)		6	3rd place, bronze medalist(s)			2nd place, silver medalist(s)
2024	British Championships		5	3rd place, bronze medalist(s)		2nd place, silver medalist(s)	

Competitive history of Frances Stone at the senior level
Year	Event	Team	AA	VT	UB	BB	FX
2025	Welsh Championships		2nd place, silver medalist(s)		2nd place, silver medalist(s)	1st place, gold medalist(s)	3rd place, bronze medalist(s)
2025	English Championships (guest)		2nd place, silver medalist(s)		3rd place, bronze medalist(s)	1st place, gold medalist(s)	2nd place, silver medalist(s)
2025	British Championships		2nd place, silver medalist(s)	2nd place, silver medalist(s)		1st place, gold medalist(s)	
2025	DTB Pokal Team Challenge	3rd place, bronze medalist(s)					
2025	European Championships	6					
2026	Welsh Championships					1st place, gold medalist(s)	
2026	British Championships		16			3rd place, bronze medalist(s)	7
2026	Commonwealth Games	4					
