= Julie Erichsen =

Norwegian artistic gymnast

- Full name: Julie Dicko Erichsen
- Born: 15 August 2001 (age 25) Bergen, Vestland, Norway
- Height: 165 cm (5 ft 5 in)

Gymnastics career
- Discipline: Women's artistic gymnastics
- Country represented: Norway
- Club: Laksevåg Turn og IL
- Head coaches: Anatol Ashurkov, Birgit Vallestrand, Laurens van der Hout
Medal record
Representing Norway
Northern European Championships
Gold medal – first place	2017 Tórshavn	Team
Gold medal – first place	2022 Jyväskylä	Uneven bars
Bronze medal – third place	2022 Jyväskylä	Team

Julie Dicko Erichsen (born 15 August 2001) is a Norwegian artistic gymnast. She competed at the 2020 Olympic Games and the 2019 World Championships. She was the first Norwegian female gymnast to compete at the Olympic Games since 1992. She is the 2022 Northern European uneven bars champion.

== Early life ==
Julie Erichsen was born on 15 August 2001, in Bergen. She was born to a Malian father and Norwegian mother. Her mother, Kari Erichsen, was also a gymnast and a Norwegian national champion. She began gymnastics when she was nine years old. She trains in Bergen for around 25 hours each week.

== Gymnastics career ==
=== Junior ===
Erichsen competed at the junior level of the 2016 European Championships with Sara Davidsen, Edel Fosse, Julie Soederstroem, and Juliane Toessebro, and the team finished 16th. She then competed at the 2016 Olympic Hopes Cup in Liberec, Czech Republic. She finished 25th in the all-around, and the Norwegian team finished sixth.

=== Senior ===
Erichsen made her senior international debut at the 2017 Northern European Championships in Tórshavn alongside Ingrid Hafenbrädl, Julie Madsø, Thea Nygaard, and Martine Skregelid where they won the team gold medal.

At the 2018 Unni & Haralds Trophy in Oslo, Erichsen finished sixth in the all-around, and she won the uneven bars silver medal. She then competed at the 2018 European Championships with Sara Davidsen, Edel Fosse, Thea Nygaard, and Julie Soederstroem, and they finished 21st in the team qualification round. At the Norwegian Championships, Erichsen finished fourth in the all-around and won the gold medal on vault and the silver medal on uneven bars. She then competed at the FIG World Cup in Paris, but she did not qualify for any event finals. She competed at the 2018 World Championships with Davidsen, Fosse, Nygaard, and Soederstroem, and they finished 34th in the team qualification round which meant they did not qualify as a team for the 2019 World Championships. Her final competition of the 2018 season was the 2018 Voronin Cup in Moscow where she won the bronze medal on vault behind Yeo Seo-jeong and Elina Vihrova.

Erichsen finished fourth on the uneven bars at the 2019 Unni & Haralds Trophy. Her first international event of the 2019 season was the FIG World Cup in Osijek where she finished eighth in the vault final. She then helped the Norwegian team finish eighth at the FIT Challenge in Ghent. At the Norwegian Championships, she defended her vault title, and she finished fourth on the balance beam and fifth in the floor exercise. Then at the Heerenveen Friendly against Italy and the Netherlands, the Norwegian team finished third. She competed at the World Cup in Paris where she finished fifth in the vault event final. At the 2019 World Championships she finished 83rd in the all-around with a score of 48.599. She qualified for an individual spot at the 2020 Olympic Games, becoming the first Norwegian female gymnast to do so since Anita Tomulevski in 1992.

Erichsen did not compete in 2020 due to the COVID-19 pandemic. She tore her Achilles tendon in April 2021. Despite the injury, she still competed at the postponed 2020 Olympic Games but only on the uneven bars. Prior to the Olympics, she competed on the uneven bars at the FIT challenge and helped the Norwegian team finish tenth. At the Olympic Games, she scored 11.566 on the uneven bars and finished 75th. After the Olympics, she won the silver medal on the uneven bars at the Norwegian Championships.

Erichsen won the gold medal on the uneven bars at the 2022 Unni & Haralds Trophy. Then at the 2022 Northern European Championships, she helped the Norwegian team win the bronze medal behind Wales and England. Individually, Erichsen won the gold medal on the uneven bars and placed seventh on the vault.

Erichsen made her 2023 debut at the Cottbus World Cup and finished sixth on the uneven bars. She then competed with the Norwegian team at the European Championships, and they finished 15th in the qualification round. She then competed at the Cairo World Cup, but she did not advance into any event finals.

== Competitive history ==
Competitive history of Julie Erichsen
Year	Event	Team	AA	VT	UB	BB	FX
2016
2016	Junior European Championships	16					
2016	Olympic Hopes Cup	6	25				
2017	Northern European Championships	1st place, gold medalist(s)					
2018	Unni & Haralds Trophy		6	6	2nd place, silver medalist(s)	6	
2018	European Championships	21					
2018	Norwegian Championships		4	1st place, gold medalist(s)	2nd place, silver medalist(s)		4
2018	World Championships	34					
2018	Voronin Cup		15	3rd place, bronze medalist(s)			
2019	Unni & Haralds Trophy				4		
2019	Osijek World Challenge Cup			8			
2019	FIT Challenge	8	37				
2019	Norwegian Championships		8	1st place, gold medalist(s)		4	5
2019	Heerenveen Friendly	3rd place, bronze medalist(s)	16				
2019	Paris World Challenge Cup			5			
2019	World Championships		83				
2021	FIT Challenge	10					
2021	Olympic Games				75		
2021	Norwegian Championships				2nd place, silver medalist(s)		
2022	Unni & Haralds Trophy				1st place, gold medalist(s)		
2022	Northern European Championships	3rd place, bronze medalist(s)		7	1st place, gold medalist(s)		
2023	Cottbus World Cup				6		
2023	European Championships	15					
2023	Norwegian Championships		4	1st place, gold medalist(s)			
2023	RomGym Trophy			3rd place, bronze medalist(s)			
2023	Unni & Haralds Trophy			1st place, gold medalist(s)			
2025	Norwegian FIG Meet					5	
2025	Unni & Haralds Trophy				4		
