= Alia Leat =

English artistic gymnast (born 2005)

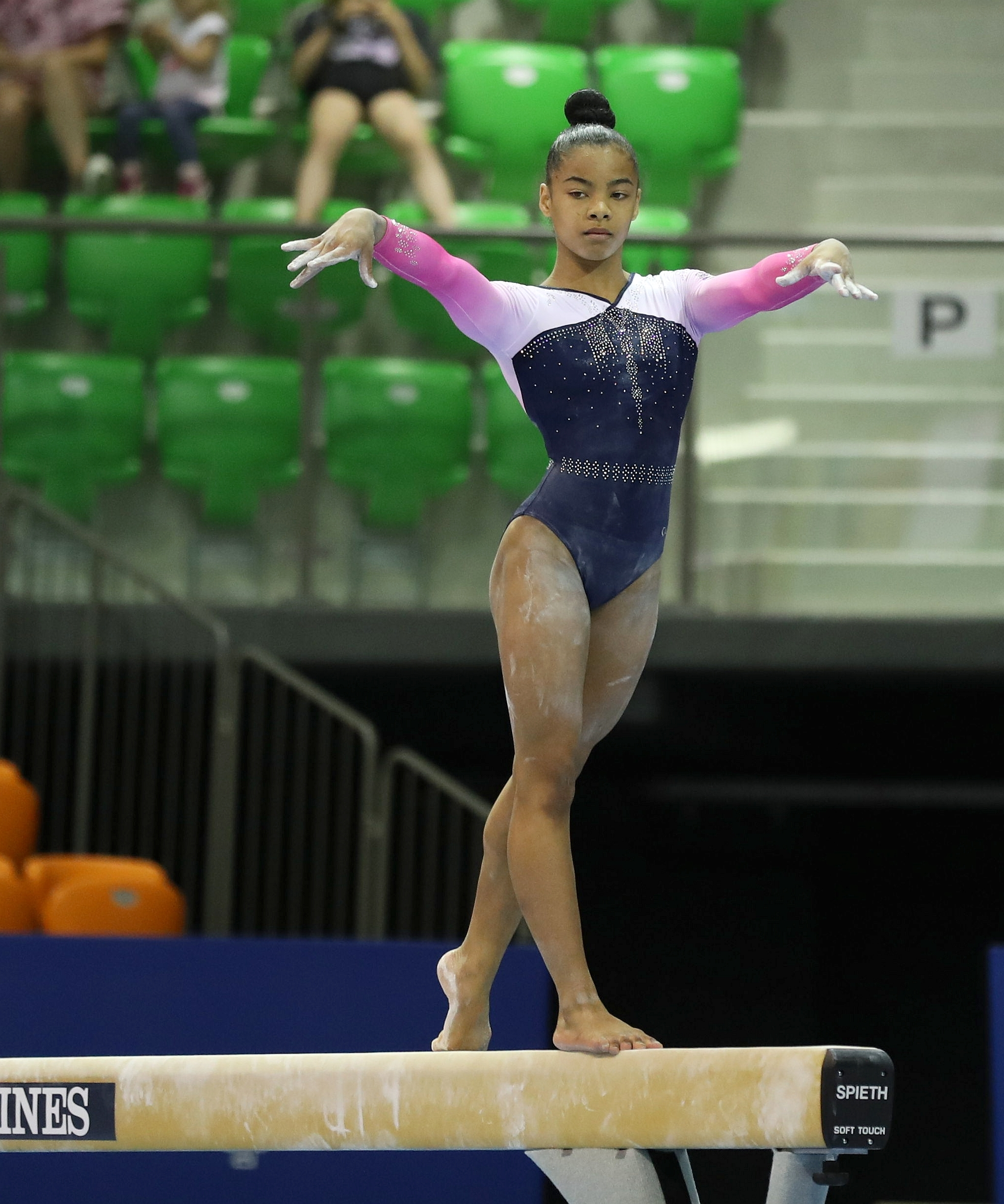
- Alia Leat at the 2019 Junior World Championships in Hungary

Personal information
- Full name: Alia Neve Leat
- Born: 27 May 2005 (age 21)

Gymnastics career
- Discipline: Women's artistic gymnastics
- Country represented: (United Kingdom) Great Britain England; (2025–Present)
- Club: Heathrow Gymnastics Club
- Head coaches: Vincent & Lilianah Walduck
Medal record
Women's artistic gymnastics
Representing Great Britain
FIG World Cup
Event / 1st / 2nd / 3rd; World Challenge Cup / 0 / 0 / 2
Representing England
Commonwealth Games
Bronze medal – third place	2026 Glasgow	Team

Alia Neve Leat (born 27 May 2005) is an English artistic gymnast and British national team member. She represented Great Britain at the 2025 European Championships and the 2025 World Championships. As a junior Leat competed at the 2019 Junior World Championships alongside Jessica and Jennifer Gadirova.

She trains at Heathrow Gymnastics Club.

== Junior gymnastics career ==
=== Espoir: 2018 ===
In February 2018, Leat competed in the English Championships as an espoir. She finished second in the all-around behind Ruby Stacey as well as first on vault and second on floor exercise in the apparatus finals. Later at the 2018 British Championships, Leat placed first in the all-around, vault and beam finals as well as second on floor exercise.

=== Junior: 2019 ===
In March 2019, Leat competed at the English Championships, where she placed sixth in the all-around. She then competed at the British Championships, where she placed third in the all-around behind Ondine Achampong and Annie Young.

Leat was selected to represent Great Britain at the inaugural Junior World Championships in Győr, Hungary, alongside twin sisters Jessica and Jennifer Gadirova. The trio finished sixth in the team final.

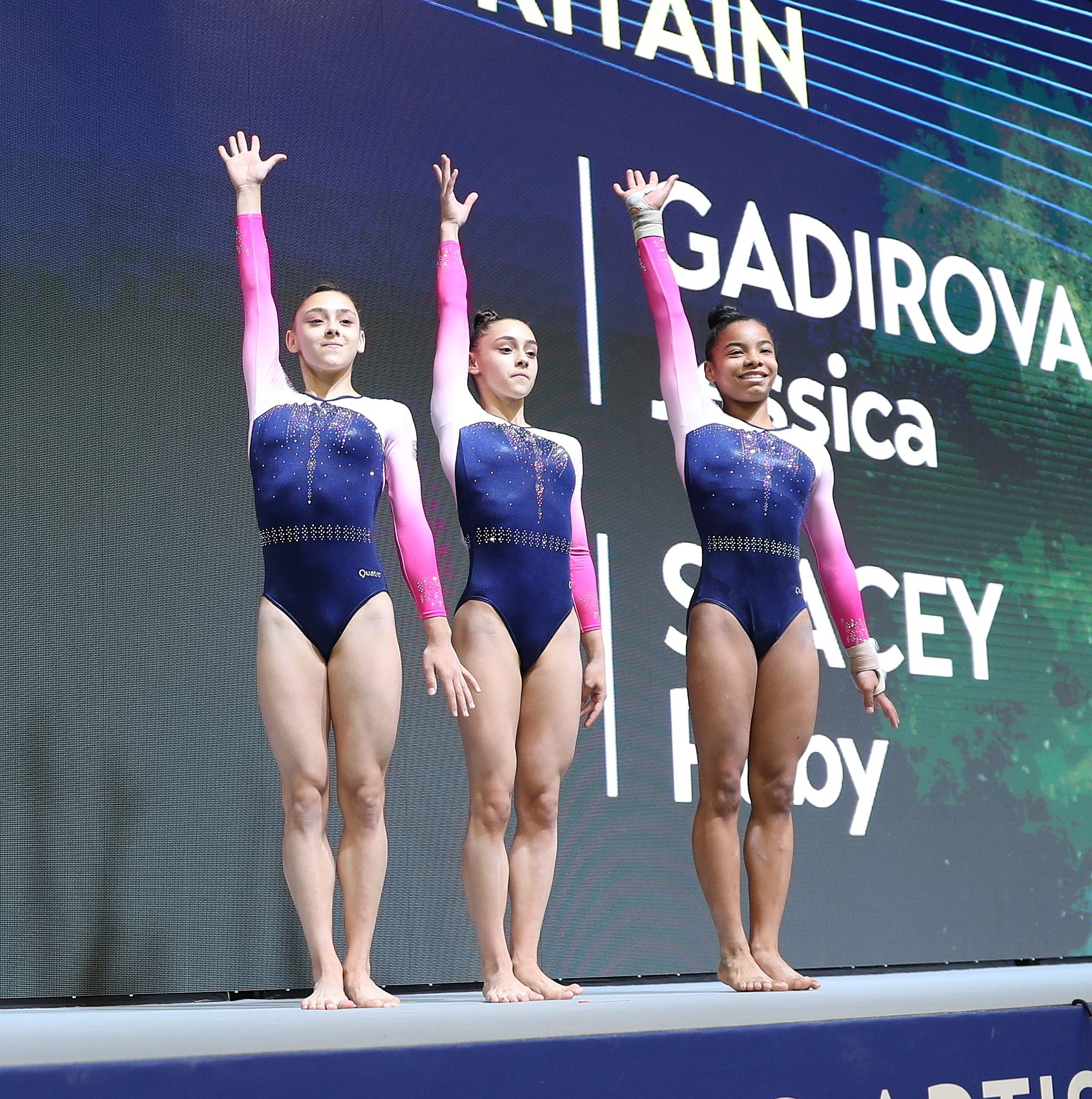
Team introductions

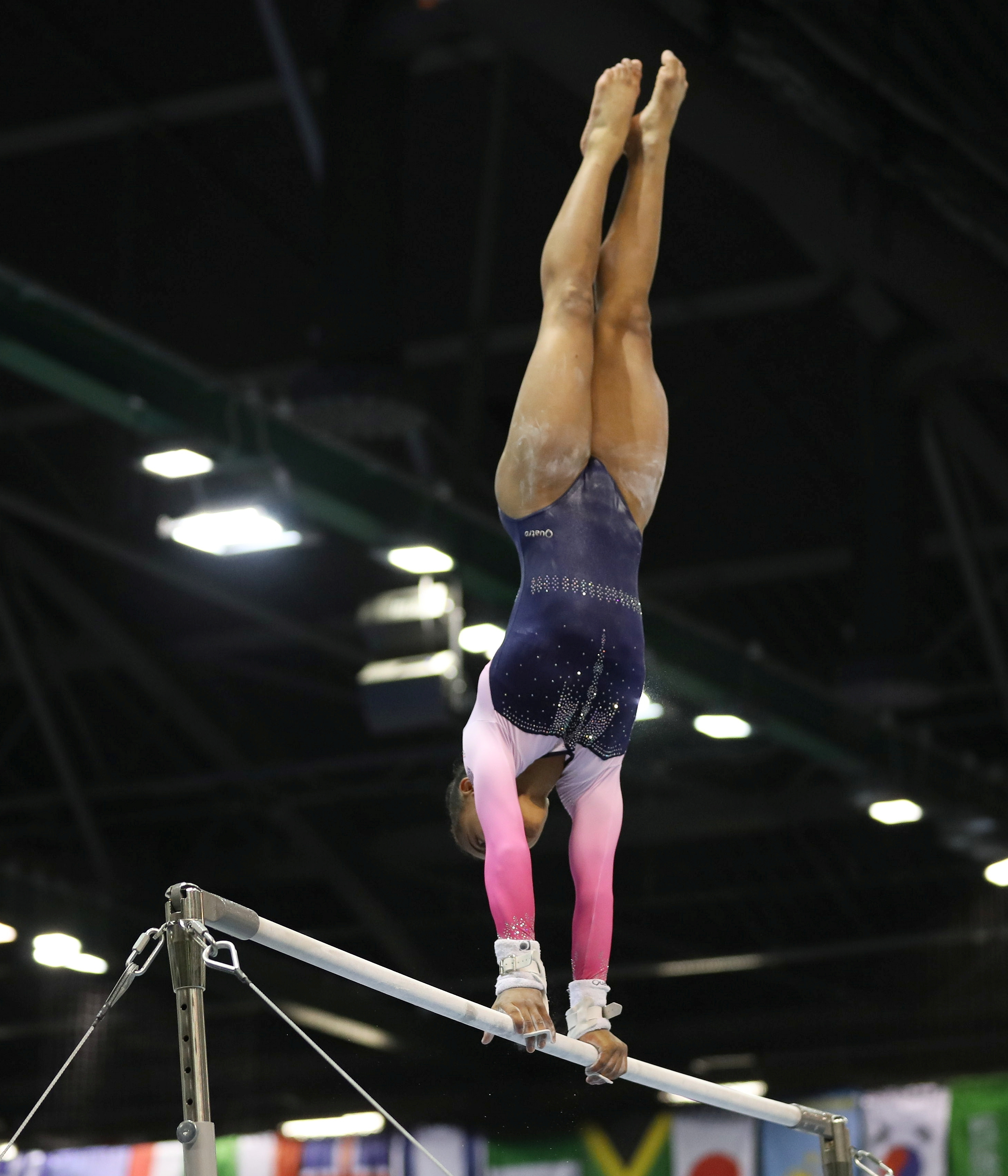
Uneven bars qualification

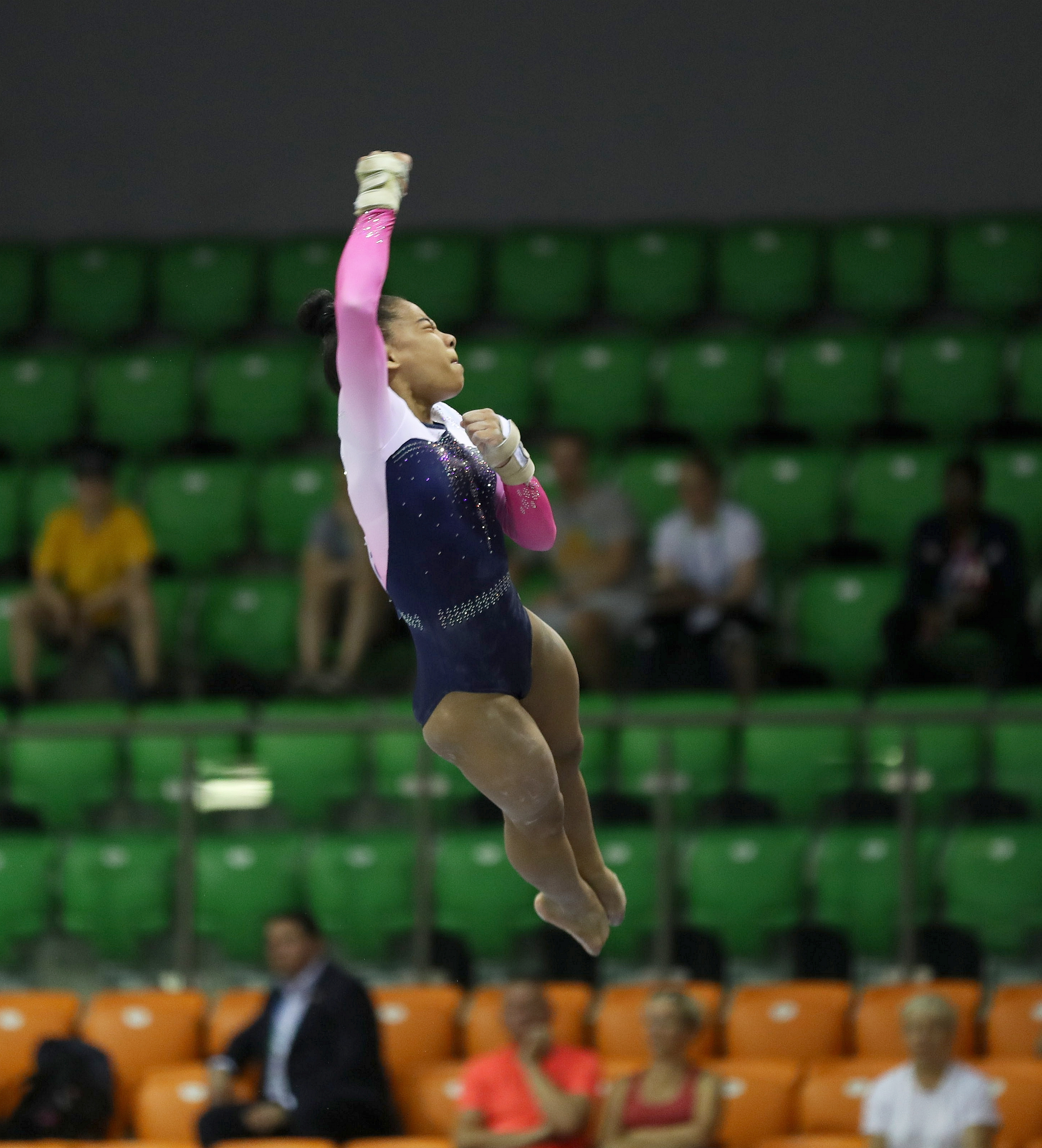
Vault qualification

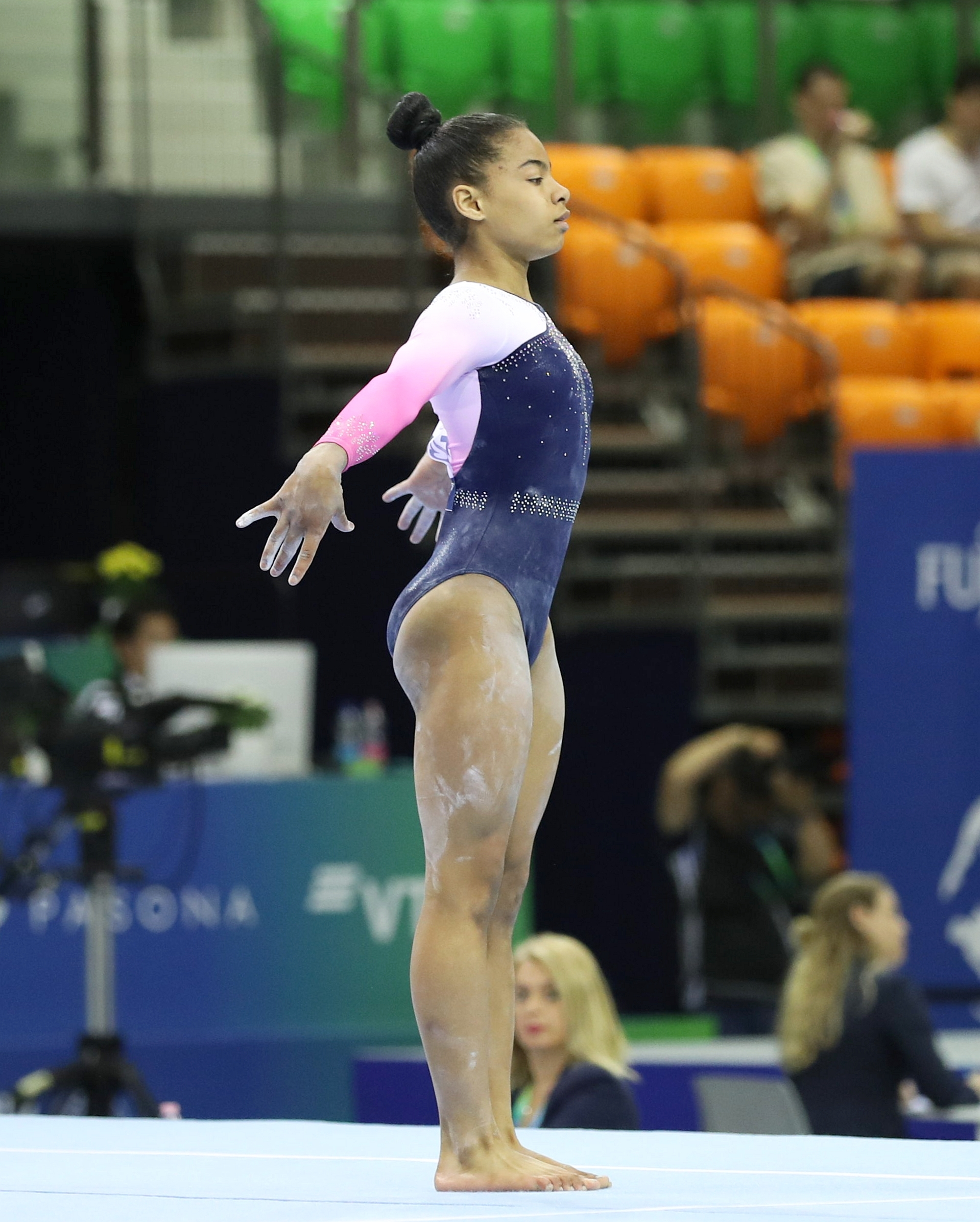
Floor qualification

Leat at the 2019 Junior World Championships

== Senior gymnastics career ==
=== 2021–2022 ===
At the 2021 British Championships, Leat finished seventh in the all-around and fourth on vault. The following year, she finished 25th at English Championships and 24th at British Championships.

=== 2025 ===
After a 2-year break, Leat returned to competition in February 2025 at the Welsh Championships placing third in the all-around open competition, behind Ruby Evans and Frances Stone. Later that month, she finished first in the all-around, floor exercise and balance beam competition at the 2025 English Championships. She was crowned British all-around champion at the 2025 British Championships and went on to place first on floor exercise in the apparatus finals. Leat was selected to represent Great Britain at the 2025 Osijek World Cup alongside Jemima Taylor.

She was named in the British squad for the 2025 European Championships alongside Frances Stone, Emily Roper, Ruby Evans and Ruby Stacey. She competed on vault, balance beam and floor exercise and helped the team place sixth. In late September Leat was selected to make her World Championships debut at the 2025 World Championships alongside Ruby Evans, Abigail Martin, and Shantae-Eve Amankwaah. In qualification she competed on balance beam, however a fall meant she did not proceed to the event finals.

=== 2026 ===
Leat competed in the all-around competition at Welsh Championships, winning silver in the open competition. At English Championships she won silver in the all-around. At British Championships Leats hand slipped on vault resulting in her finishing fifth in the all-around competition. She qualified for the balance beam final where she won gold. She was named in the British team for the Luxembourg Open alongside Abigail Roper, Jemima Taylor and Grace Davies. The team won gold and individually Leat won gold in the all-around, balance beam and floor exercise competition. Leat attended the Koper Challenge Cup and won bronze on balance beam and floor exercise, her first world cup medals. In June, Leat was announced as part of the English team at the 2026 Commonwealth Games, alongside Abigail Martin, Taeja James (later replaced by Shanna-Kae Grant), Ruby Stacey and Shantae-Eve Amankwaah. She helped the team win bronze and qualified for the beam final where she finished fifth.

Leat was selected to represent Great Britain at the 2026 World Championships alongside Ruby Evans, Martin, Becky Downie, Alice Kinsella, and alternate Amankwaah.

== Competitive history ==
Competitive history of Alia Leat at the junior level
Year	Event	Team	AA	VT	UB	BB	FX
2018	English Championships		2nd place, silver medalist(s)	1st place, gold medalist(s)			2nd place, silver medalist(s)
2018	British Championships		1st place, gold medalist(s)	1st place, gold medalist(s)		1st place, gold medalist(s)	2nd place, silver medalist(s)
2019	English Championships		6	3rd place, bronze medalist(s)			
2019	British Championships		3rd place, bronze medalist(s)				
2019	Junior World Championships	6					
2019	British Team Championships						3rd place, bronze medalist(s)
2019	Rushmoor Rosebowl		1st place, gold medalist(s)	3rd place, bronze medalist(s)		1st place, gold medalist(s)	1st place, gold medalist(s)

Competitive history of Alia Leat at the senior level
Year	Event	Team	AA	VT	UB	BB	FX
2021	British Championships		7	4			
2022	English Championships		25				
2022	British Championships		24				
2025	Welsh Championships (open)		3rd place, bronze medalist(s)				
2025	English Championships		1st place, gold medalist(s)		1st place, gold medalist(s)	1st place, gold medalist(s)	
2025	British Championships		1st place, gold medalist(s)			1st place, gold medalist(s)	
2025	Osijek World Cup				24	18	22
2025	European Championships	6					
2025	World Championships	—N/a				38	
2026	Welsh Championships (open)		2nd place, silver medalist(s)				
2026	English Championships		2nd place, silver medalist(s)		8	4	8
2026	British Championships		5			1st place, gold medalist(s)	
2026	Luxembourg Open	1st place, gold medalist(s)	1st place, gold medalist(s)			1st place, gold medalist(s)	1st place, gold medalist(s)
2026	Koper World Challenge Cup					3rd place, bronze medalist(s)	3rd place, bronze medalist(s)
2026	Commonwealth Games	3rd place, bronze medalist(s)				5	
2026	European Championships	4				5	
2026	World Championships	R1					
