= Jemima Taylor =

Welsh artistic gymnast

- Full name: Jemima Taylor
- Born: 18 March 2009 (age 17) Newport, Wales

Gymnastics career
- Discipline: Women's artistic gymnastics
- Country represented: Wales (United Kingdom) Great Britain; (2025–present)
- Club: Clwb Cymru Caerdydd
Medal record
Representing Wales
Northern European Championships
Bronze medal – third place	2026 Aalborg	Team

Jemima Taylor (born 18 March 2009) is a Welsh Artistic gymnast and British national team member. She represented Wales at the 2026 Commonwealth Games and won silver on floor exercise at the 2025 British Championships.

As a junior Taylor has represented Great Britain at the 2023 Junior World Championships and 2024 European Championships.

== Gymnastics career ==
=== Junior: 2023–2024 ===
Taylor represented Great Britain at the 2023 Junior World Championships alongside Abigail Martin and Ema Kandalova where the team finished ninth and Taylor qualified for the floor exercise final. Later that year she was named to the British team alongside Kandalova and Ellie Lewis for the 2023 European Youth Summer Olympic Festival. The team won bronze and individually Taylor placed fourteenth in the all-around and made the vault and floor exercise finals.

Taylor was part of the junior British team at the 2024 European Championships which included Shantae-Eve Amankwaah, Isabelle Priestley, Ellie Lewis and Tahlia Wyatt. The team placed fifth and individually Taylor placed eleventh in the all-around.

=== Senior: 2025–present ===
Taylor became age-eligible for senior-level competition in 2025. At the Welsh Championships, she won bronze in the all-around behind Ruby Evans and Frances Stone as well as silver on floor exercise. She went on to win silver on floor exercise behind Alia Leat at the 2025 British Championships. Taylor competed at the 2025 Osijek World Cup where she placed fourth on floor exercise. She was named as first reserve for the 2025 European Championships.

Taylor was selected to represent Wales at the 2026 Commonwealth Games alongside Ruby Evans, Frances Stone, Emily Roper, and Abigail Roper. She helped the team finish fourth and individually she qualified to the uneven bars finals where she ultimately finished seventh.

== Competitive history ==
Competitive history of Jemima Taylor at the junior level
Year	Event	Team	AA	VT	UB	BB	FX
2021	British Championships		5			1st place, gold medalist(s)	1st place, gold medalist(s)
2022	Welsh Championships		2nd place, silver medalist(s)	5	5	9	
2022	British Championships		2nd place, silver medalist(s)				1st place, gold medalist(s)
2022	British Team Championships	1st place, gold medalist(s)	3rd place, bronze medalist(s)				1st place, gold medalist(s)
2023	English Championships (guest)		1st place, gold medalist(s)		1st place, gold medalist(s)	1st place, gold medalist(s)	1st place, gold medalist(s)
2023	Welsh Championships		1st place, gold medalist(s)	2nd place, silver medalist(s)	1st place, gold medalist(s)	1st place, gold medalist(s)	2nd place, silver medalist(s)
2023	British Championships		43				
2023	Junior World Championships	9	22				8
2023	European Youth Olympic Festival	3rd place, bronze medalist(s)	14	9			4
2024	English Championships (guest)				3rd place, bronze medalist(s)		2nd place, silver medalist(s)
2024	British Championships		7		8	7	2nd place, silver medalist(s)
2024	European Championships	5	11				
2024	British Team Championships	1st place, gold medalist(s)	1st place, gold medalist(s)		3rd place, bronze medalist(s)	2nd place, silver medalist(s)	1st place, gold medalist(s)
2024	Rushmoor Rosebowl		7		1st place, gold medalist(s)	6	

Competitive history of Jemima Taylor at the senior level
Year	Event	Team	AA	VT	UB	BB	FX
2025	Welsh Championships		3rd place, bronze medalist(s)				2nd place, silver medalist(s)
2025	English Championships (guest)		3rd place, bronze medalist(s)		2nd place, silver medalist(s)	2nd place, silver medalist(s)	3rd place, bronze medalist(s)
2025	British Championships		19				2nd place, silver medalist(s)
2025	Osijek World Cup						4
2026	British Championships		11		3rd place, bronze medalist(s)		4
2026	Commonwealth Games	4			7		R1
2026	Northern European Championships	3rd place, bronze medalist(s)					
