= Ruby Evans =

Welsh artistic gymnast (born 2007)

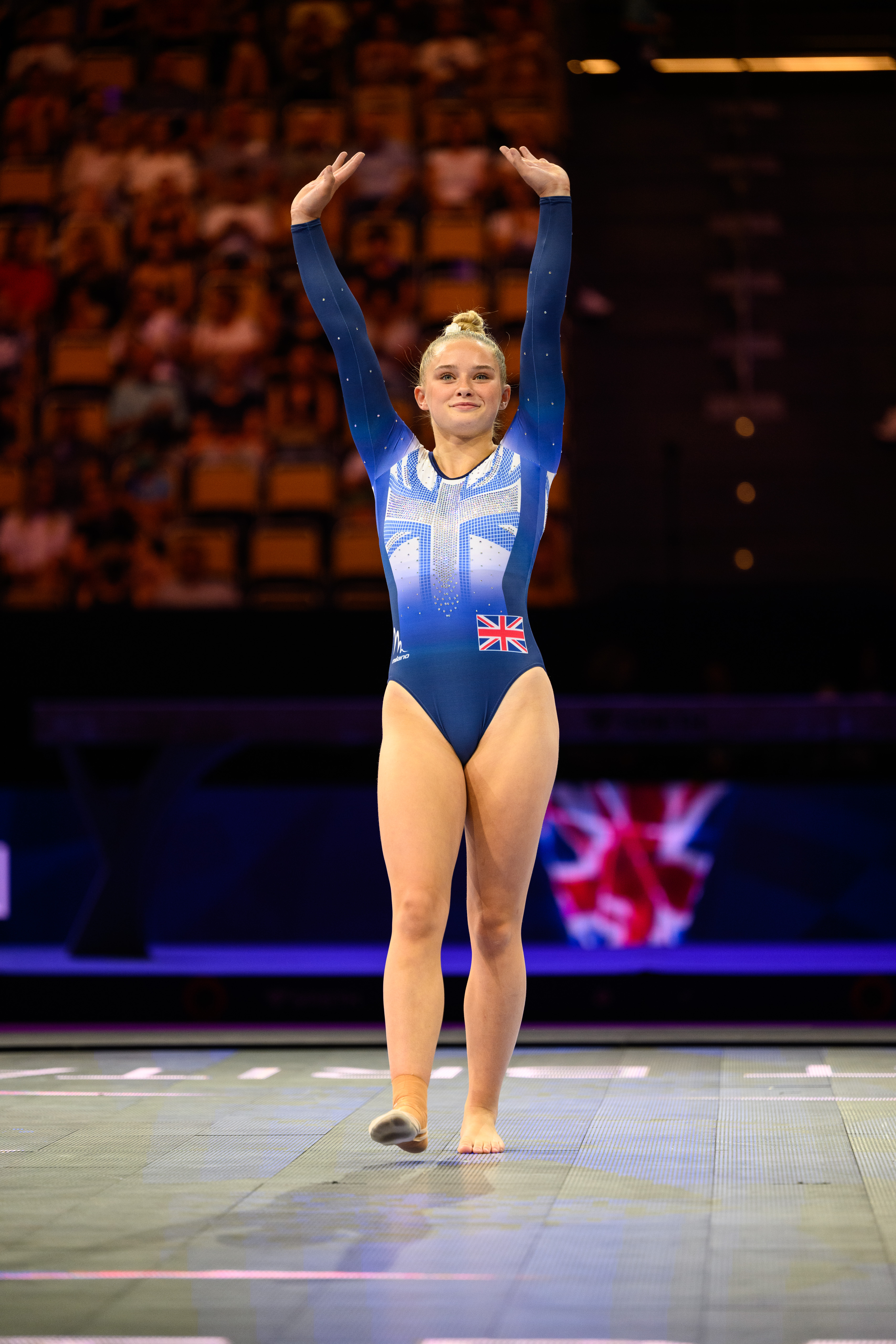
- Evans at the 2022 European Championships

Personal information
- Full name: Ruby Grace Evans
- Born: 17 March 2007 (age 19) Cardiff, Wales

Gymnastics career
- Discipline: Women's artistic gymnastics
- Country represented: Wales (United Kingdom) Great Britain; (2021–present)
- Club: Clwb Cymru Caerdydd
- Head coaches: Tracey Skirton-Davies; Olivia Bryl
Medal record
Women's artistic gymnastics
Representing Great Britain
World Championships
Silver medal – second place	2025 Jakarta	Floor exercise
European Championships
Silver medal – second place	2024 Rimini	Team
Silver medal – second place	2025 Leipzig	Mixed team
FIG World Cup
Event	1st	2nd	3rd
Apparatus World Cup	0	2	1
World Challenge Cup	1	0	1
Total	1	2	2
Representing Wales
Commonwealth Games
Gold medal – first place	2026 Glasgow	Floor exercise
Northern European Championships
Gold medal – first place	2022 Jyväskylä	Team
Gold medal – first place	2022 Jyväskylä	Vault
Gold medal – first place	2023 Halmstad	Team
Gold medal – first place	2023 Halmstad	All-around
Gold medal – first place	2023 Halmstad	Floor exercise

Ruby Grace Evans (born 17 March 2007) is a Welsh artistic gymnast and a member of the British national team. She represented Great Britain at the 2024 Summer Olympics. She is the 2025 World Championships silver medallist on floor exercise, becoming the first Welsh gymnast to win an individual medal at the World Championships. She was part of the silver-medal-winning team at the 2024 European Championships and the silver-medal-winning mixed team at the 2025 European Championships.

Representing Wales, she won the floor exercise title at the 2026 Commonwealth Games and is a five-time Northern European champion.

== Early life ==
Evans was born in Cardiff in 2007. She began training in gymnastics when she was four years old.

== Junior gymnastics career ==
=== 2019–21 ===
Evans competed at her first Welsh Championships in 2019, placing third in the all-around in the espoir division. The following month, she competed at the British Championships, where she placed seventh in the all-around and second on floor exercise.

Due to the global COVID-19 pandemic, most competitions were cancelled or postponed in 2020. Evans competed at Elite Gym Massilia in late 2021, where she placed thirteenth in the all-around and seventh on vault. She next competed at the 2021 British Championships, where she won the junior all-around title.

=== 2022 ===
Early in the year, Evans competed at the Welsh and British Championships, winning the junior titles at both. In July, she competed at the European Youth Olympic Festival, where she helped Great Britain finish sixth. Individually, she won silver on vault behind Helen Kevric. The following month, Evans competed at the European Championships, where she helped Great Britain finish fourth. Individually, she placed thirteenth in the all-around and fourth on floor exercise.

In November, Evans competed at the Northern European Championships. She helped Wales win the team competition. Individually, she won gold on vault. Evans ended the year at the Top Gym Tournament, where she placed second in the all-around.

== Senior gymnastics career ==
=== 2023 ===
Evans became age-eligible for senior competition in 2023. She made her senior debut for Great Britain at the Cottbus World Cup, where she won silver on vault behind Manila Esposito and bronze on floor exercise behind Azuki Kokofugata and Esposito. At the Welsh Championships, Evans placed second behind Poppy-Grace Stickler. At the British Championships, she placed fifth in the all-around but won gold on vault.

In September, Evans was selected to represent Great Britain at the 2023 World Championships alongside Jessica Gadirova, Alice Kinsella, Ondine Achampong and Georgia-Mae Fenton. With her selection, Evans became the first Welsh gymnast in 17 years to be named to a Great Britain team at the World Championships. The last Welsh gymnasts to do so were Olivia Bryl and Lynette Lisle in 2006. At the World Championships, Evans helped the team qualify second for the team final. During the team final, she contributed scores on vault and floor exercise to Great Britain's sixth-place finish.

Evans ended the year at the Northern European Championships. She helped Wales win the team competition and individually won gold in the all-around and on floor exercise.

=== 2024 ===
Evans began the year at the Welsh Championships, placing first in the all-around, vault, uneven bars and floor exercise. She competed as a guest at the English Championships, placing first on floor exercise and second on balance beam. At the British Championships, she placed second in the all-around. Evans was named to the European Championships team alongside Ondine Achampong (later replaced by Abigail Martin), Alice Kinsella, Becky Downie and Georgia-Mae Fenton. There, she helped Great Britain win the silver medal behind Italy.

In June, Evans was selected to represent Great Britain at the 2024 Summer Olympics alongside Downie, Kinsella, Fenton and Martin. Evans became the first Welsh female gymnast to be selected for the British Olympic team since Sonia Lawrence, who competed at the 1996 Olympic Games. During the qualification round at the Olympic Games, Evans helped Great Britain qualify for the team final. During the team final, Evans contributed scores on vault and floor exercise to Great Britain's fourth-place finish.

=== 2025 ===
Evans returned to the Welsh Championships, where she retained her all-around, uneven bars and floor exercise titles. She also won silver on balance beam. She was due to compete at the Cottbus World Cup. However, she suffered an injury while performing a vault and withdrew from the competition. This injury also prevented her from competing at the British Gymnastics Championships. She was named in the British squad for the 2025 European Championships alongside Alia Leat, Frances Stone, Emily Roper and Ruby Stacey. She competed in the all-around, helping Great Britain finish sixth. Individually, she qualified for the mixed team final, where she won silver alongside Jake Jarman; the all-around final, where she finished tenth; and the floor exercise final, where she placed fourth.

In late September, Evans was selected to represent Great Britain at the 2025 World Championships alongside Leat, Abigail Martin and Shantae-Eve Amankwaah. She qualified for the all-around and floor exercise finals in eleventh and third respectively. During the all-around final, she performed cleanly on all four apparatuses and finished tenth. During the floor exercise final, she won the silver medal behind Aiko Sugihara of Japan and ahead of teammate Martin. This medal made Evans the first Welsh gymnast to win an individual medal at the World Championships.

=== 2026 ===
Evans competed at the 2026 British Championships, where she won gold in the all-around, becoming the first Welsh athlete to win the title in over 60 years. She represented Wales at the 2026 Commonwealth Games, where she helped the team finish fourth and qualified individually for the all-around, uneven bars, balance beam and floor exercise finals. During the all-around final, she fell off the balance beam and finished sixth. She withdrew from the uneven bars final in order to allow teammate Jemima Taylor to compete. On the final day of the competition, she finished seventh on the balance beam before winning gold on floor exercise. She was the first Welsh athlete to win a gold medal at the 2026 Commonwealth Games and became the first Welsh gymnast in history to win a gold medal in any Commonwealth Games event.

Evans was selected to represent Great Britain at the 2026 World Championships alongside Alice Kinsella, Abigail Martin, Becky Downie, Alia Leat, and alternate Shantae-Eve Amankwaah.

== Competitive history ==
Competitive history of Ruby Evans at the junior level
Year	Event	Team	AA	VT	UB	BB	FX
2019	Welsh Championships		3rd place, bronze medalist(s)				
2019	British Championships		7				2nd place, silver medalist(s)
2021	Elite Gym Massilia	5	13	7			
2021	British Championships		1st place, gold medalist(s)	3rd place, bronze medalist(s)			
2022	Welsh Championships		1st place, gold medalist(s)	1st place, gold medalist(s)	3rd place, bronze medalist(s)	2nd place, silver medalist(s)	3rd place, bronze medalist(s)
2022	British Championships		1st place, gold medalist(s)	2nd place, silver medalist(s)	1st place, gold medalist(s)	6	6
2022	International GymSport		2nd place, silver medalist(s)	1st place, gold medalist(s)		2nd place, silver medalist(s)	
2022	European Youth Olympic Festival	6		2nd place, silver medalist(s)			
2022	European Championships	4	13				4
2022	Northern European Championships	1st place, gold medalist(s)		1st place, gold medalist(s)			
2022	Top Gym Tournament		2nd place, silver medalist(s)	1st place, gold medalist(s)			2nd place, silver medalist(s)

Competitive history of Ruby Evans at the senior level
Year	Event	Team	AA	VT	UB	BB	FX
2023	Cottbus World Cup			2nd place, silver medalist(s)		6	3rd place, bronze medalist(s)
2023	Welsh Championships		2nd place, silver medalist(s)	1st place, gold medalist(s)	2nd place, silver medalist(s)		1st place, gold medalist(s)
2023	British Championships		5	1st place, gold medalist(s)			5
2023	World Championships	6					
2023	Northern European Championships	1st place, gold medalist(s)	1st place, gold medalist(s)				1st place, gold medalist(s)
2024	Welsh Championships		1st place, gold medalist(s)	1st place, gold medalist(s)	1st place, gold medalist(s)	4	1st place, gold medalist(s)
2024	English Championships (guest)					2nd place, silver medalist(s)	1st place, gold medalist(s)
2024	British Championships		2nd place, silver medalist(s)				
2024	Doha World Cup						2nd place, silver medalist(s)
2024	European Championships	2nd place, silver medalist(s)					
2024	Varna Challenge Cup					3rd place, bronze medalist(s)	1st place, gold medalist(s)
2024	Olympic Games	4					
2024	Rushmoor Rose Bowl		3rd place, bronze medalist(s)	1st place, gold medalist(s)			1st place, gold medalist(s)
2025	Welsh Championships		1st place, gold medalist(s)		1st place, gold medalist(s)	2nd place, silver medalist(s)	1st place, gold medalist(s)
2025	European Championships	6	10				4
2025	European Championships Mixed Team	2nd place, silver medalist(s)	—N/a				
2025	Paris World Challenge Cup						7
2025	World Championships	—N/a	10				2nd place, silver medalist(s)
2025	Arthur Gander Memorial		4				
2026	British Championships		1st place, gold medalist(s)		4		1st place, gold medalist(s)
2026	Commonwealth Games	4	6		WD	7	1st place, gold medalist(s)
2026	European Championships	4	8				4
2026	World Championships	R1					
