= Halle Hilton =

British artistic gymnast (born 2004)

- Born: 10 June 2004 (age 22) Basildon, Essex, England

Gymnastics career
- Country represented: Ireland
- Former countries represented: Great Britain
- Club: Pipers Vale Gymnastics Club
- Head coach: Josie Hayes
Medal record
Representing Ireland
Northern European Championships
Gold medal – first place	2022 Jyväskylä	Balance beam
Gold medal – first place	2024 Dublin	Team
Bronze medal – third place	2022 Jyväskylä	All-around
Bronze medal – third place	2024 Dublin	All-around
Bronze medal – third place	2024 Dublin	Vault

Halle Hilton (born 10 June 2004) is a British-born artistic gymnast who represents Ireland in international competition. A former British junior national team member, she participated in the 2018 European Championships where she won a bronze in the team competition. She began representing Ireland at the senior level in 2022 and is a five-time Northern European Championships medalist. She is the 2023 Irish national all-around champion.

== Early life ==
Hilton was born in Basildon, England, on 10 June 2004 to an Irish mother. She began gymnastics when she was two years old at the Pipers Vale Gymnastics Club. She has a brother named Keenan who also represents Ireland in artistic gymnastics.

== Gymnastics career ==
=== Junior ===
Hilton competed on the balance beam for the British team at the 2018 European Championships and helped the team win the bronze medal behind Italy and Russia. Additionally, she qualified for the balance beam final and finished eighth. She won a bronze medal with the British team at the 2019 European Youth Olympic Festival, and she placed eighth in the all-around competition. She also qualified for the balance beam final and finished in fourth place, 0.100 points away from the bronze medal.

=== Senior ===
Hilton decided to switch to representing Ireland for more opportunities to compete internationally. Her nationality change was officially approved by the International Gymnastics Federation in May 2022. She then competed at the 2022 European Championships where she placed 38th in the all-around competition. With this result, she qualified for the 2022 World Championships. There, she finished 63rd in the all-around during the qualification round. After the World Championships, she competed at the 2022 Northern European Championships and won a bronze medal in the all-around competition. Then in the event finals, she won a gold medal on the balance beam and finished seventh on the floor exercise.

Hilton competed at the 2023 European Championships and finished 54th in the all-around qualification round. With this result, she qualified for the 2023 World Championships. She then won the gold medal in the all-around at the Irish Championships. At the 2023 Paris World Challenge Cup, she finished eighth on the vault and seventh on the floor exercise. Then at the World Championships, she finished 59th in the all-around during the qualification round and did not qualify for an Olympic berth.

Hilton competed at the 2024 Northern European Championships in Dublin and helped the Irish team win the gold medal. She won a bronze medal in the all-around competition behind teammate Emma Slevin and Iceland's Thelma Aðalsteinsdóttir. Then in the vault final, she won another bronze medal.

== See also ==
- Nationality changes in gymnastics
