= Gymnastics at the 2015 European Games – Men's artistic team all-around =

Men's artistic team all-around at the 2015 European Games
- Venue: National Gymnastics Arena
- Date: 14–15 June 2015
- Competitors: 78 from 26 nations
- Winning score: 178.963

Medalists
gold medal	David Belyavskiy; Nikita Ignatyev; Nikolai Kuksenkov	Russia
silver medal	Ihor Radivilov; Oleg Verniaiev; Mykyta Yermak	Ukraine
bronze medal	Petro Pakhnyuk; Eldar Safarov; Oleg Stepko	Azerbaijan

The men's artistic gymnastics team all-around competition at the 2015 European Games was held at the National Gymnastics Arena, Baku on 14 and 15 June 2015. The team final also served as a qualification round for the all-around and event finals.

== Qualification ==
Event	Criterion	Athletes per NOC	Qualified
Teams
Host quota		3	Azerbaijan
2014 European Championships	Team places 1-25	3	Great Britain; Russia; Ukraine; Belarus; France; Netherlands; Germany; Romania; Switzerland; Italy; Belgium; Finland; Spain; Greece; Hungary; Bulgaria; Ireland; Portugal; Turkey; Latvia; Austria; Poland; Czech Republic; Serbia; Norway
TOTAL		78	26

== Results ==
Rank	Country	Floor (gymnastics)	Pommel horse	Rings (gymnastics)	Vault (gymnastics)	Parallel bars	Horizontal bar	Total
1st place, gold medalist(s)	Russia	29.500 (3)	29.166 (2)	29.533 (2)	29.666 (4)	30.766 (2)	30.332 (2)	178.963
1st place, gold medalist(s)	David Belyavskiy	15.100	14.800	14.100	13.766	15.600		178.963
1st place, gold medalist(s)	Nikita Ignatyev	14.300	14.366	15.000	14.900	15.133	15.366	178.963
1st place, gold medalist(s)	Nikolai Kuksenkov	14.400	13.566	14.533	14.766	15.166	14.966	178.963
2nd place, silver medalist(s)	Ukraine	29.566 (2)	28.266 (5)	30.766 (1)	30.732 (1)	28.966 (7)	29.133 (5)	177.429
2nd place, silver medalist(s)	Ihor Radivilov	13.633		15.566	15.266		13.733	177.429
2nd place, silver medalist(s)	Oleg Verniaiev	15.100	14.700	15.200	15.466	15.666	15.400	177.429
2nd place, silver medalist(s)	Mykyta Yermak	14.466	13.566	13.900	14.066	13.300	13.733	177.429
3rd place, bronze medalist(s)	Azerbaijan	28.699 (10)	29.966 (1)	27.433 (9)	29.699 (3)	30.832 (1)	27.566 (13)	174.195
3rd place, bronze medalist(s)	Petro Pakhnyuk	14.833	14.633		14.833	15.266	13.666	174.195
3rd place, bronze medalist(s)	Eldar Safarov	11.766	9.133	12.733	12.433	11.500	12.100	174.195
3rd place, bronze medalist(s)	Oleg Stepko	13.866	15.333	14.700	14.866	15.566	13.900	174.195
4	Belarus	29.433 (4)	28.233 (6)	27.966 (7)	29.566 (5)	28.999 (6)	29.933 (3)	174.130
4	Dzmitry Barkalau	15.000	14.333	14.166	14.700	14.233	14.933	174.130
4	Pavel Bulauski	14.433		13.266	14.866			174.130
4	Andrey Likhovitskivy		13.900	13.800		14.766	15.000	174.130
5	Germany	27.966 (14)	27.466 (9)	28.399 (5)	29.166 (7)	29.466 (5)	30.333 (1)	172.796
5	Fabian Hambüchen	15.033	13.300	14.633	14.433	14.400	15.633	172.796
5	Sebastian Krimer	12.366	13.533	11.933	14.233	15.066	14.633	172.796
5	Andreas Tobe	12.933	13.933	13.766	14.733	14.266	14.700	172.796
6	France	27.999 (13)	28.766 (3)	28.400 (4)	28.600 (12)	29.766 (4)	28.766 (7)	172.297
6	Axel Augis	12.933	14.566	13.800	14.133	15.100	14.666	172.297
6	Guillame Auguglivaro	13.633	14.200	14.600	14.300	14.433	13.866	172.297
6	Julien Goaux	14.366	12.833	13.100	14.300	14.666	14.100	172.297
7	Spain	29.900 (1)	28.066 (7)	26.866 (15)	29.333 (6)	28.199 (11)	29.066 (6)	171.430
7	Néstor Abbad	13.733	13.566	13.533	14.800	15.066	14.500	171.430
7	Fabián González	14.600	14.500	13.233	14.533	13.133	14.566	171.430
7	Rayderley Zapata	15.300		13.333	14.033	12.100		171.430
8	Great Britain	29.300 (5)	28.299 (4)	27.632 (8)	29.899 (2)	28.833 (8)	27.399 (15)	171.362
8	Frank Baines	14.900			14.866			171.362
8	Brinn Bevan	14.133	14.766	13.866	15.033	14.800	13.666	171.362
8	Nile Wiltson	14.400	13.533	13.766	14.333	14.033	13.733	171.362
9	Romania	27.866 (15)	27.766 (8)	27.433 (9)	28.833 (10)	30.699 (3)	28.600 (8)	171.197
9	Cristian Bățagă	13.700	14.300	13.600	14.533	14.333	13.600	171.197
9	Marius Berbecar		13.466		13.200	15.633	13.800	171.197
9	Vlad Cotuna	14.166	13.200	13.833	14.300	15.066	14.800	171.197
10	Greece	27.699 (16)	26.199 (12)	28.899 (3)	28.533 (14)	27.399 (17)	29.732 (4)	168.461
10	Nikolaos Iliopoulos	13.100	13.233	13.166	14.233	13.666	13.966	168.461
10	Vlasios Maras	13.733	12.966	12.066		13.733	15.766	168.461
10	Eleftherios Petrounias	13.966	12.700	15.733	14.300	12.633	12.133	168.461
11	Norway	28.399 (11)	26.466 (11)	26.333 (21)	28.299 (15)	27.766 (13)	27.866 (12)	165.129
11	Marcus Conradi	13.966	13.266	12.433	14.033	13.466	13.033	165.129
11	Pietro Giachino	13.800	12.233	13.133	13.633	12.833	13.966	165.129
11	Stian Skjerahaug	14.433	13.200	13.200	14.266	14.300	13.900	165.129
12	Switzerland	29.033 (7)	25.666 (16)	26.632 (18)	29.133 (8)	27.166 (20)	27.399 (15)	165.029
12	Michael Meier	13.466	13.066	13.466	13.433	13.733	12.100	165.029
12	Marco Rizzo	15.000	12.600	13.033	14.433	13.166	13.433	165.029
12	Taha Serhani	14.033	12.566	13.166	14.700	13.433	13.966	165.029
13	Hungary	27.399 (19)	26.700 (10)	27.066 (12)	27.899 (17)	28.599 (10)	27.066 (20)	164.729
13	Ádám Babos	13.433	13.800	13.700	12.300	14.133	13.533	164.729
13	Norbert Dudás	12.533	12.900	13.366	13.966	14.466	13.333	164.729
13	Nandor Szabó	13.966	12.433	13.366	13.933	13.033	13.533	164.729
14	Italy	28.766 (9)	25.733 (14)	27.000 (14)	27.766 (19)	28.132 (12)	28.232 (11)	164.629
14	Nicola Bartolini	14.066	9.933	11.066	14.500	14.466	13.766	164.629
14	Andrea Cingolani	14.466	12.400	13.700	13.100	12.966		164.629
14	Tommaso De Vecchis	14.300	13.333	13.300	13.266	13.666	14.466	164.629
15	Netherlands	28.899 (8)	25.700 (15)	26.700 (17)	28.632 (11)	26.932 (21)	27.100 (19)	163.963
15	Frank Rijken		12.300	13.000		13.266	13.800	163.963
15	Casimir Schmidt	14.833	13.400	13.700	14.666	13.666	13.300	163.963
15	Bram Verhofstad	14.066		11.566	13.966		12.266	163.963
16	Austria	27.533 (17)	25.532 (17)	27.100 (11)	28.100 (16)	27.232 (19)	28.400 (9)	163.897
16	Vinzenz Höck	13.466	12.766	14.100	13.900	12.900	13.133	163.897
16	Fabian Leimlehner	13.700	12.566	13.000	13.666	13.866	14.200	163.897
16	Matthias Schwab	13.833	12.766	12.300	14.200	13.366	14.200	163.897
17	Ireland	29.099 (6)	26.132 (13)	26.466 (19)	27.433 (22)	27.466 (16)	26.899 (21)	163.495
17	Kieran Behan	15.066	12.666	13.833	14.033	14.400	13.833	163.495
17	Daniel Fox	12.666	13.066	12.633	13.200	12.600	12.633	163.495
17	Rohan Sebastian	14.033	13.066		13.400	13.066	13.066	163.495
18	Belgium	27.499 (18)	25.433 (18)	26.433 (20)	27.332 (23)	27.766 (13)	28.266 (10)	162.729
18	Gilles Gentges	13.466	12.400	13.133	13.566	13.800	13.366	162.729
18	Luka Van den Keybus	12.966	11.700	13.300	13.166	13.666	14.200	162.729
18	Jimmy Verbaeys	14.033	13.033	12.933	13.766	13.966	14.066	162.729
19	Finland	28.300 (12)	24.766 (21)	27.033 (13)	28.566 (13)	26.800 (22)	26.699 (23)	162.164
19	Oskar Kirmes	14.100	13.433	13.333	13.766	13.100	12.733	162.164
19	Heikki Niva		11.333			13.300	13.966	162.164
19	Tomi Tuuha	14.200		13.700	14.800	13.500		162.164
20	Serbia	26.866 (22)	25.266 (19)	25.199 (23)	27.533 (21)	27.233 (18)	25.999 (26)	158.096
20	Bojan Dejanović	13.233	11.766	11.166	14.200	13.400	13.366	158.096
20	Miloš Paunović	13.100	12.433	13.466	13.100	13.833	12.633	158.096
20	Petar Veličković	13.633	12.833	11.733	13.333	12.833	10.533	158.096
21	Portugal	26.866 (22)	22.733 (24)	26.866 (15)	27.566 (20)	27.566 (15)	26.233 (24)	157.830
21	Bernando Almeida	13.766	9.600	14.066	14.233	14.300	12.800	157.830
21	Simao Almeida	11.800	11.500	12.800	12.900	13.266	13.433	157.830
21	Vasco Barata	13.100	11.233	12.066	13.333	13.166	12.333	157.830
22	Czech Republic	26.866 (22)	25.099 (20)	24.666 (25)	27.833 (18)	25.733 (25)	27.433 (14)	157.630
22	David Jessen	12.866	13.266	12.666	14.433	12.533	14.333	157.630
22	Martin Konečný		11.400	12.000		12.900	13.100	157.630
22	Daniel Radovesnický	14.000	11.833	11.366	13.400	12.833	12.433	157.630
23	Latvia	26.199 (25)	23.732 (23)	25.199 (23)	28.999 (9)	26.232 (24)	27.132 (18)	157.493
23	Vitālijs Kardašovs	12.733		12.133	14.766			157.493
23	Sergejs Poznakovs	13.466	10.266	13.066	14.233	12.966	13.166	157.493
23	Dmitrijs Trefilovs		13.466			13.266	13.966	157.493
24	Poland	26.999 (21)	24.566 (22)	26.066 (22)	27.099 (24)	23.433 (26)	26.133 (25)	154.296
24	Łukasz Borkowski	12.733	12.466	13.200	13.833	11.933	13.300	154.296
24	Maksim Kowalenko	12.233	12.100	12.400	13.266	11.500	12.833	154.296
24	Roman Kulesza	14.266	8.600	12.866				154.296
25	Bulgaria	27.100 (20)	21.133 (25)	23.233 (26)	25.733 (25)	26.466 (23)	27.232 (17)	150.897
25	Yordan Aleksandrov	13.600	9.900	12.233	10.266	12.833	13.366	150.897
25	Martin Angelov	13.500	11.233	8.933	13.133	13.633	12.800	150.897
25	Aleksandar Batinkov	12.733	8.400	11.000	12.600	12.233	13.866	150.897
26	Turkey	14.066 (26)	14.266 (26)	28.333 (6)	14.766 (26)	28.766 (9)	26.832 (22)	127.029
26	Ferhat Arıcan	14.066	14.266	13.500	14.766	15.366	13.866	127.029
26	İbrahim Çolak			14.833		13.400		127.029
26	Ümit Şamiloğlu						12.966	127.029

== Qualification for finals ==
This competition also served as the qualification round for the all-around final and the event finals. The top 18 gymnasts with only one per country qualified for the all-around final. The top 6 gymnasts on each event with only one per country qualified for the event finals.

=== All-around ===
Rank	Gymnast	Nation	Floor (gymnastics)	Pommel horse	Rings (gymnastics)	Vault (gymnastics)	Parallel bars	Horizontal bar	Total	Qual.
1	Oleg Verniaiev	Ukraine	15.100	14.700	15.200	15.466	15.666	15.400	91.532	Q
2	Nikita Ignatyev	Russia	14.300	14.366	15.000	14.900	15.133	15.366	89.065	Q
3	Oleg Stepko	Azerbaijan	13.866	15.333	14.700	14.866	15.566	13.900	88.231	Q
4	Fabian Hambüchen	Germany	15.033	13.300	14.633	14.433	14.400	15.633	87.432	Q
5	Nikolai Kuksenkov	Russia	14.400	13.566	14.533	14.766	15.166	14.966	87.397	
6	Dzmitry Barkalau	Belarus	15.000	14.333	14.166	14.700	14.233	14.933	87.365	Q
7	Brinn Bevan	Great Britain	14.133	14.766	13.866	15.033	14.800	13.666	86.264	Q
8	Ferhat Arıcan	Turkey	14.066	14.266	13.500	14.766	15.366	13.866	85.830	Q
9	Vlad Cotuna	Romania	14.166	13.200	13.833	14.300	15.066	14.800	85.365	Q
10	Axel Augis	France	12.933	14.566	13.800	14.133	15.100	14.666	85.198	Q
11	Néstor Abad	Spain	13.733	13.566	13.533	14.800	15.066	14.500	85.198	Q
12	Guillaume Augugliaro	France	13.633	14.200	14.600	14.300	14.433	13.866	85.032	
13	Fabián González	Spain	14.600	14.500	13.233	14.533	13.133	14.566	84.565	
14	Andreas Toba	Germany	12.933	13.933	13.766	14.733	14.266	14.700	84.331	
15	Cristian Bățagă	Romania	13.700	14.300	13.600	14.533	14.333	13.600	84.066	
16	Alexander Shatilov	Israel	15.166	14.100	12.733	14.200	14.366	13.400	83.965	Q
17	Kieran Behan	Ireland	15.066	12.666	13.833	14.033	14.400	13.833	83.831	Q
18	Nile Wilson	Great Britain	14.400	13.533	13.766	14.333	14.033	13.733	83.798	
19	Casimir Schmidt	Netherlands	14.833	13.400	13.700	14.666	13.666	13.300	83.565	Q
20	Julien Gobaux	France	14.366	12.833	13.100	14.300	14.666	14.100	83.365	
21	Stian Skjerahaug	Norway	14.433	13.200	13.200	14.266	14.300	13.900	83.299	Q
22	Mykyta Yermak	Ukraine	14.466	13.566	13.900	14.066	13.300	13.733	83.031	
23	Tommaso De Vecchis	Italy	14.300	13.333	13.300	13.266	13.666	14.466	82.331	Q
24	Rokas Guščinas	Lithuania	12.800	13.700	14.300	13.733	14.000	13.766	82.299	Q
25	Taha Serhani	Switzerland	14.033	12.566	13.166	14.700	13.433	13.966	81.864	Q
26	Jimmy Verbaeys	Belgium	14.033	13.033	12.933	13.766	13.966	14.066	81.797	Q
27	Marios Georgiou	Cyprus	13.400	12.633	12.100	14.433	14.600	14.600	81.766	R1
28	Sebastian Krimmer	Germany	12.366	13.533	11.933	14.233	15.066	14.633	81.764	
29	Marco Rizzo	Switzerland	15.000	12.600	13.033	14.433	13.166	13.433	81.665	
30	Eleftherios Petrounias	Greece	13.966	12.700	15.733	14.300	12.633	12.133	81.465	R2
31	Nikolaos Iliopoulos	Greece	13.100	13.233	13.166	14.233	13.666	13.966	81.364	
32	Fabian Leimlehner	Austria	13.700	12.566	13.000	13.666	13.866	14.200	80.998	R3
33	Ádám Babos	Hungary	13.433	13.800	13.700	12.300	14.133	13.533	80.899	R4

=== Floor ===
Rank	Gymnast	D Score	E Score	Pen.	Total	Qual.
1	Rayderley Zapata (ESP)	6.700	8.600		15.300	Q
2	Alexander Shatilov (ISR)	6.600	8.666	–0.100	15.166	Q
3	David Belyavskiy (RUS)	6.600	8.600	–0.100	15.100	Q
4	Oleg Verniaiev (UKR)	6.700	8.400		15.100	Q
5	Kieran Behan (IRL)	6.300	8.766		15.066	Q
6	Fabian Hambüchen (GER)	6.400	8.633		15.033	Q
7	Dzmitry Barkalau (BLR)	6.100	8.900		15.000	R1
8	Marco Rizzo (SUI)	6.200	8.800		15.000	R2
9	Frank Baines (GBR)	6.300	8.600		14.900	R3

=== Pommel horse ===
Rank	Gymnast	D Score	E Score	Pen.	Total	Qual.
1	Oleg Stepko (AZE)	6.700	8.633		15.333	Q
2	Sašo Bertoncelj (SLO)	6.500	8.666		15.166	Q
3	David Belyavskiy (RUS)	6.300	8.500		14.800	Q
4	Brinn Bevan (GBR)	6.400	8.366		14.766	Q
5	Oleg Verniaiev (UKR)	7.100	7.600		14.700	Q
6	Slavomír Michňák (SVK)	6.300	8.366		14.666	Q
7	Petro Pakhnyuk (AZE)	6.400	8.233		14.633	
8	Axel Augis (FRA)	5.900	8.666		14.566	R1
9	Fabián González (ESP)	6.200	8.300		14.500	R2
10	Nikita Ignatyev (RUS)	6.100	8.266		14.366	
11	Dzmitry Barkalau (BLR)	6.000	8.333		14.333	R3

=== Rings ===
Rank	Gymnast	D Score	E Score	Pen.	Total	Qual.
1	Eleftherios Petrounias (GRE)	6.800	8.933		15.733	Q
2	Ihor Radivilov (UKR)	6.700	8.866		15.566	Q
3	Oleg Verniaiev (UKR)	6.600	8.600		15.200	
4	Nikita Ignatyev (RUS)	6.600	8.400		15.000	Q
5	İbrahim Çolak (TUR)	6.600	8.233		14.833	Q
6	Oleg Stepko (AZE)	6.200	8.500		14.700	Q
7	Fabian Hambüchen (GER)	5.900	8.733		14.633	Q, WD
8	Guillaume Augugliaro (FRA)	6.000	8.600		14.600	R1
9	Nikolai Kuksenkov (RUS)	6.300	8.233		14.533	
10	Rokas Guščinas (LTU)	5.600	8.700		14.300	R2
11	Dzmitry Barkalau (BLR)	6.100	8.066		14.166	R3

=== Vault ===
Rank	Gymnast	Vault 1				Vault 2				Total	Qual.
Rank	Gymnast	D Score	E Score	Pen.	Score 1	D Score	E Score	Pen.	Score 2	Total	Qual.
1	Oleg Verniaiev (UKR)	6.000	9.466		15.466	6.000	9.200		15.200	15.333	Q
2	Ihor Radivilov (UKR)	6.000	9.266		15.266	6.000	8.866		14.666	14.966	
3	Oleg Stepko (AZE)	5.600	9.266		14.866	5.600	9.200		14.800	14.833	Q
4	Tomi Tuuha (FIN)	5.600	9.200		14.800	5.600	9.100	–0.200	14.000	14.650	Q
5	Ferhat Arıcan (TUR)	5.600	9.166		14.766	5.200	9.000		14.200	14.483	Q
6	Casimir Schmidt (NED)	6.000	8.766	–0.100	14.666	5.600	8.566		14.166	14.416	Q
7	Cristian Bățagă (ROU)	5.600	9.033	–0.100	14.533	5.200	9.100		14.300	14.416	Q
8	Marco Rizzo (SUI)	5.600	8.933	–0.100	14.433	5.600	8.766		14.366	14.399	R1
9	Pavel Bulauski (BLR)	5.600	9.266		14.866	6.000	7.900	–0.100	13.800	14.333	R2
10	Fabián González (ESP)	5.600	8.933		14.533	5.200	8.733		13.933	14.233	R3

=== Parallel bars ===
Rank	Gymnast	D Score	E Score	Pen.	Total	Qual.
1	Oleg Verniaiev (UKR)	6.900	8.766		15.666	Q
2	Marius Berbecar (ROU)	6.700	8.933		15.633	Q
3	David Belyavskiy (RUS)	6.600	9.000		15.600	Q
4	Oleg Stepko (AZE)	6.800	8.766		15.566	Q
5	Ferhat Arıcan (TUR)	6.600	8.766		15.366	Q
6	Petro Pakhnyuk (AZE)	6.800	8.466		15.266	
7	Nikolai Kuksenkov (RUS)	6.600	8.566		15.166	
8	Nikita Ignatyev (RUS)	6.800	8.333		15.133	
9	Axel Augis (FRA)	6.300	8.800		15.100	Q
10	Néstor Abad (ESP)	6.400	8.666		15.066	R1
10	Sebastian Krimmer (GER)	6.400	8.666		15.066	R1
12	Vlad Cotuna (ROU)	6.600	8.466		15.066	
13	Brinn Bevan (GBR)	6.200	8.600		14.800	R3

=== Horizontal bar ===
Rank	Gymnast	D Score	E Score	Pen.	Total	Qual.
1	Vlasios Maras (GRE)	6.900	8.866		15.766	Q
2	Fabian Hambüchen (GER)	7.000	8.633		15.633	Q
3	Oleg Verniaiev (UKR)	6.500	8.900		15.400	Q
4	Nikita Ignatyev (RUS)	6.800	8.566		15.366	Q
5	Marijo Možnik (CRO)	6.200	8.900		15.100	Q
6	Andrey Likhovitskiy (BLR)	6.400	8.600		15.000	Q
7	Nikolai Kuksenkov (RUS)	6.500	8.466		14.966	
8	Dzmitry Barkalau (BLR)	6.200	8.733		14.933	
9	Vlad Cotuna (ROU)	6.300	8.500		14.800	R1
10	Andreas Toba (GER)	6.600	8.100		14.700	
10	Axel Augis (FRA)	6.200	8.466		14.666	R2
12	Sebastian Krimmer (GER)	6.300	8.333		14.633	
13	Marios Georgiou (CYP)	5.600	9.000		14.600	R3
