= 2015 Northern European Gymnastics Championships =

International gymnastics competition

- Venue: University of Limerick Arena
- Location: Limerick, Ireland
- Start date: 18 September 2015
- End date: 20 September 2015

The 2015 Northern European Gymnastics Championships was an artistic gymnastics competition held in the city of Limerick in the mid-west of the Republic of Ireland. The event was held between 18 and 20 September at the University of Limerick.

== Schedule ==
Saturday 18 September 2015 (Team and Individual All-Around competition)

- 9:10 am – 12:25 pm Subdivision 1: WAG - Iceland, Norway, Isle of Man, Faroe Islands, Scotland. MAG - Norway, Isle of Man, Wales, Faroe Islands, Finland.
- 1:45 pm – 6:10 pm Subdivision 2: WAG - Wales, Ireland, Denmark, Finland. MAG - Denmark, Sweden, Iceland, Ireland.
- 6:20 pm: Medal Presentations

Sunday 19 September 2015 (Men's and Women's Individual Apparatus Finals)

- 10:25 am – 10:54 am: MAG Floor Exercise
- 10:54 am – 11:23 am: MAG Pommel Horse and WAG Vault
- 11:23 am – 11:52 am: MAG Rings and WAG Uneven Bars
- 12:50 am– 1:19 pm: MAG Vault
- 1:19 pm – 1:48 pm: MAG Parallel Bars and WAG Balance Beam
- 1:48 pm – 2:17 pm: MAG High Bar and WAG Floor Exercise
- 2:30 pm: Medal Presentations

== Medalists ==
Event	Gold	Silver	Bronze
Men
Team all-around	Ireland; Kieran Behan; Jack Neill; Rhys McClenaghan; Andrew Smith; Rohan Sebastian	Norway; Stian Skjerahaug; Pietro Giachino; Marcus Conradi; Odin Kalvo	Finland; Miro Niemi; Emil Soravuo; Heikki Niva; Aaro Lamberg; Juho Kanerva
Individual all-around	Stian Skjerahaug (NOR)	Kieran Behan (IRL)	Andrew Smith (IRL)
Floor	Kieran Behan (IRL)	Christopher Soos (SWE)	Pietro Giachino (NOR)
Pommel horse	Jac Davies (WAL)	Juho Kanerva (FIN)	Rhys McClenaghan (IRL)
Rings	Stian Skjerahaug (NOR)	Kieran Behan (IRL)	Michael Trane (SWE)
Vault	Emil Soravuo (FIN)	Aaro Lamberg (FIN)	Eypor Baldursson (ISL)
Parallel bars	Stian Skjerahaug (NOR)	Andrew Smith (IRL)	Marcus Conradi (NOR)
Horizontal bar	Stian Skjerahaug (NOR)	Heikki Niva (FIN)	Michael Trane (SWE)
Women
Team all-around	Wales; Latalia Bevan; Rebecca Moore; Jolie Ruckley; Zoe Simmons; Raer Theaker	Ireland; Casey Jo Bell; Tara Donnelly; Li Ling Martin; Nicole Mawhinney; Ellis O'Reilly	Iceland; Dominiqua Belanyi; Sigridur Bergthorsdottir; Tinns Ooinsdottir; Irina Sazonova; Norma Robertsdottir
Individual all-around	Latalia Bevan (WAL)	Ellis O'Reilly (IRL)	Jolie Ruckley (WAL)
Vault	Norma Robertsdottir (ISL)	Sigridur Bergthorsdottir (ISL)	Marie Skammelsen (DEN)
Uneven bars	Irina Sazonova (ISL)	Jolie Ruckley (WAL)	Casey Jo Bell (IRL)
Balance beam	Latalia Bevan (WAL)	Ellis O'Reilly (IRL)	Marie Sjammelsen (DEN)
Floor	Latalia Bevan (WAL)	Louise McColgan (SCO)	Irina Sazonova (ISL)

== Medal table ==
Rank	Nation	Gold	Silver	Bronze	Total
1	Wales (WAL)	5	1	1	7
2	Norway (NOR)	4	1	2	7
3	Ireland (IRL)	2	6	3	11
4	Iceland (ISL)	2	1	3	6
5	Finland (FIN)	1	3	1	5
6	Sweden (SWE)	0	1	2	3
7	Scotland (SCO)	0	1	0	1
8	Denmark (DEN)	0	0	2	2
Totals (8 entries)		14	14	14	42
