= 2016 Northern European Gymnastics Championships =

International gymnastics competition

- Venue: Trondheim Spektrum
- Location: Trondheim, Norway
- Start date: 22 October 2016
- End date: 23 October 2016

The 2016 Northern European Gymnastics Championships was an artistic gymnastics competition held in the city of Trondheim in Norway. The event was held between 22 and 23 October.

== Medalists ==
Event	Gold	Silver	Bronze
Men
Team all-around	Norway; Pietro Giachino; Harald Wibye; Stian Skjerahaug; Marcus Conbradi; Sofus Heggemsnes	Sweden; Christopher Soos; William Broman; David Rumbutis; Tony Do; Henrik Schröder	Scotland; Kelvin Cham; Pavel Karnejenko; David Weir; Patrick Murphey; Joshua Lincoln
Individual all-around	Christopher Soos (SWE)	Sofus Heggemsnes (NOR)	Pavel Karnejenko (SCO)
Floor	Stian Skjerahaug (NOR)	Christopher Soos (SWE)	Clinton Purnell (WAL)
Pommel horse	Jac Davies (WAL)	Sofus Heggemsnes (NOR)	Pavel Karnejenko (SCO)
Rings	William Broman (SWE)	Marcus Bovien Frandsen (DEN)	Pavel Karnejenko (SCO)
Vault	Clinton Purnell (WAL)	Emil Soravuo (FIN)	David Rumbutis (SWE)
Parallel bars	Pietro Giachino (NOR)	Joao Marcus Fuglsig (DEN)	Sofus Heggemsnes (NOR)
Horizontal bar	Stian Skjerahaug (NOR)	Jacob Buus (DEN)	Christopher Soos (SWE)
Women
Team all-around	Norway; Juliane Tøssebro; Linn Finstad; Solveig Berg; Thea Mille Nygaard; Maria Tonrud	Finland; Maija Leinonen; Siiri Saukkonen; Rosanna Ojala; Jenni Ronroosni	Wales; Rebecca Moore; Emily Thomas; Sioned Thomas; Paige Thomas
Individual all-around	Marie Skammelsen (DEN)	Rosanna Ojala (FIN)	Maija Leinonen (FIN)
Vault	Marie Skammelsen (DEN)	Sioned Thomas (WAL)	Sigríður Hrönn Bergþórsdóttir (ISL)
Uneven bars	Emily Thomas (WAL)	Rosanna Ojala (FIN)	Mette Hulgaard (DEN)
Balance beam	Maija Leinonen (FIN)	Erin McLachlan (SCO)	Rosanna Ojala (FIN)
Floor	Marie Skammelsen (DEN)	Sioned Thomas (WAL)	Juliane Tøssebro (NOR)

== Medal table ==
Rank	Nation	Gold	Silver	Bronze	Total
1	Norway (NOR)	5	2	2	9
2	Denmark (DEN)	3	3	1	7
3	Wales (WAL)	3	2	2	7
4	Sweden (SWE)	2	2	2	6
5	Finland (FIN)	1	4	2	7
6	Scotland (SCO)	0	1	4	5
7	Iceland (ISL)	0	0	1	1
Totals (7 entries)		14	14	14	42
