= Poppy-Grace Stickler =

Welsh artistic gymnast

Poppy Stickler
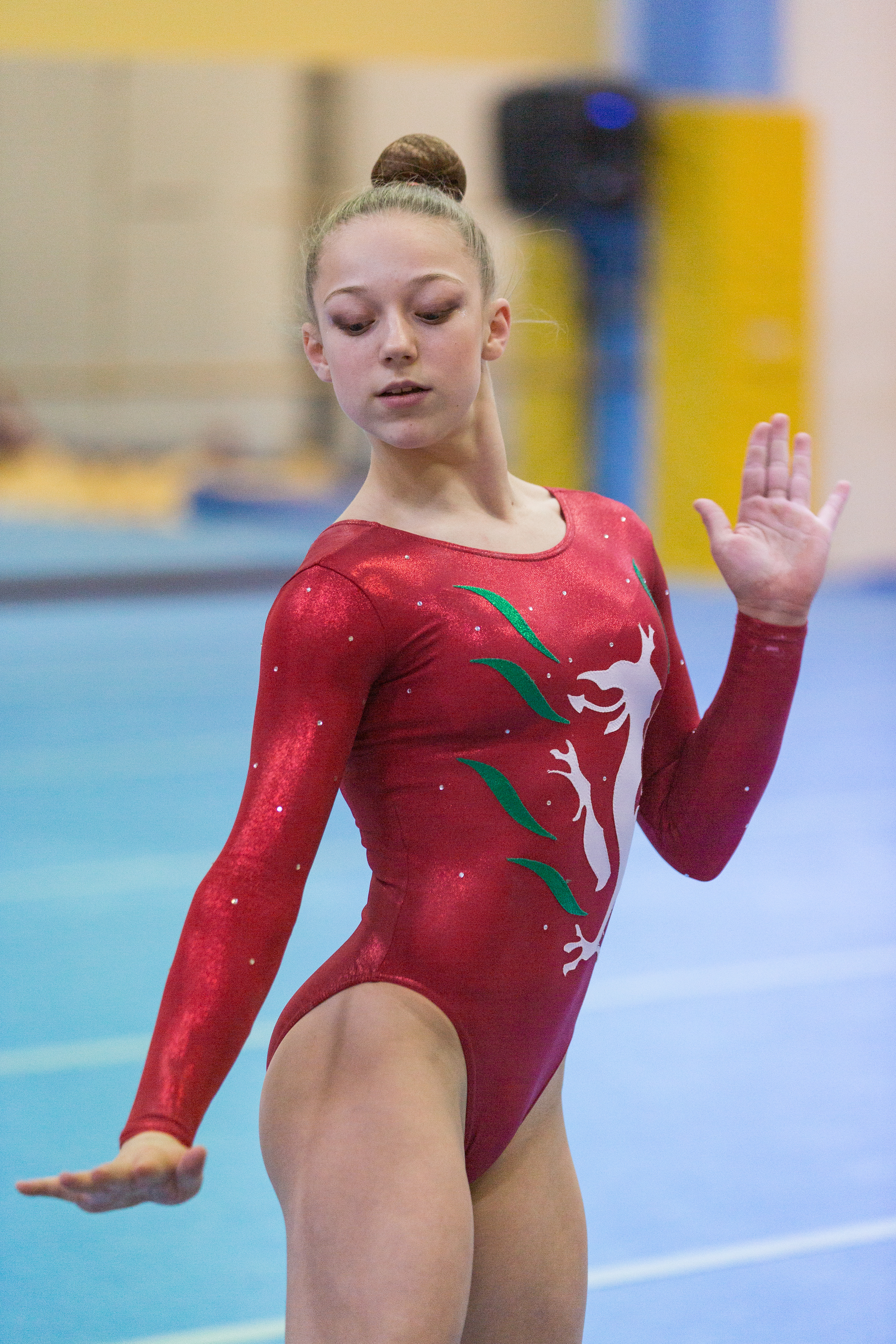
- Stickler in 2019

Personal information
- Full name: Poppy-Grace Stickler
- Born: 12 June 2006 (age 20) Cardiff, Wales

Gymnastics career
- Discipline: Women's artistic gymnastics
- Country represented: Wales (United Kingdom) Great Britain; (2018–present)
- College team: Utah Red Rocks (2025–28)
- Club: Cymru Caerdydd
- Gym: Capital Academy
- Head coach: Olivia Bryl
Medal record
Women's artistic gymnastics
Representing Great Britain
World Championships
Silver medal – second place	2022 Liverpool	Team
FIG World Cup
Event	1st	2nd	3rd
World Challenge Cup	0	1	0
Total	0	1	0
Representing Wales
Northern European Championships
Gold medal – first place	2019 Kópavogur	Team
Gold medal – first place	2023 Halmstad	Team
Silver medal – second place	2019 Kópavogur	All-Around
Bronze medal – third place	2023 Halmstad	Uneven Bars

Poppy-Grace Stickler (born 12 June 2006) is a Welsh artistic gymnast. She is the 2019 Northern European all-around silver medalist and represented Wales at the 2022 Commonwealth Games. Stickler was named as the alternate for the British team at the 2023 World Championships

In September 2024 she joined the Utah Red Rocks gymnastics team.

== Early life ==
Stickler was born in Cardiff in 2006. She attended Whitchurch High School.

== Junior gymnastics career ==
=== Espoir: 2017–19 ===
Stickler competed at her first Welsh Championships in 2017. She placed fourth in the espoir division. In 2018 Stickler competed at her first British Championships where she placed eleventh in the espoir division. Additionally she won bronze on balance beam behind Alia Leat and Mali Morgan. Stickler made her international debut for Wales at the 2018 Africa Safari International where she helped Wales finish second as a team. Individually she finished seventh in the all-around, fourth on vault, and fifth on floor exercise. She ended the year competing at the British Team Championships where she helped Club Cymru Caerdydd finish first as team and individually Stickler finished third in the all-around.

Stickler competed at the Welsh and British Championships early in 2019. In April she competed at the Pre-Olympic Youth Cup where she placed first in the all-around in the 2006 division. At the British Team Championships Stickler finished third in the all-around. In September Stickler competed at the Northern European Championships. While there she helped Wales finish first as a team. Individually she won silver in the all-around behind fellow Welsh gymnast Emily Thomas. Additionally she finished seventh on balance beam and fifth on floor exercise. Stickler ended the year competing at the Olympic Hopes Cup. While there she helped Wales finish second as a team behind China. Individually she won bronze on vault and floor exercise.

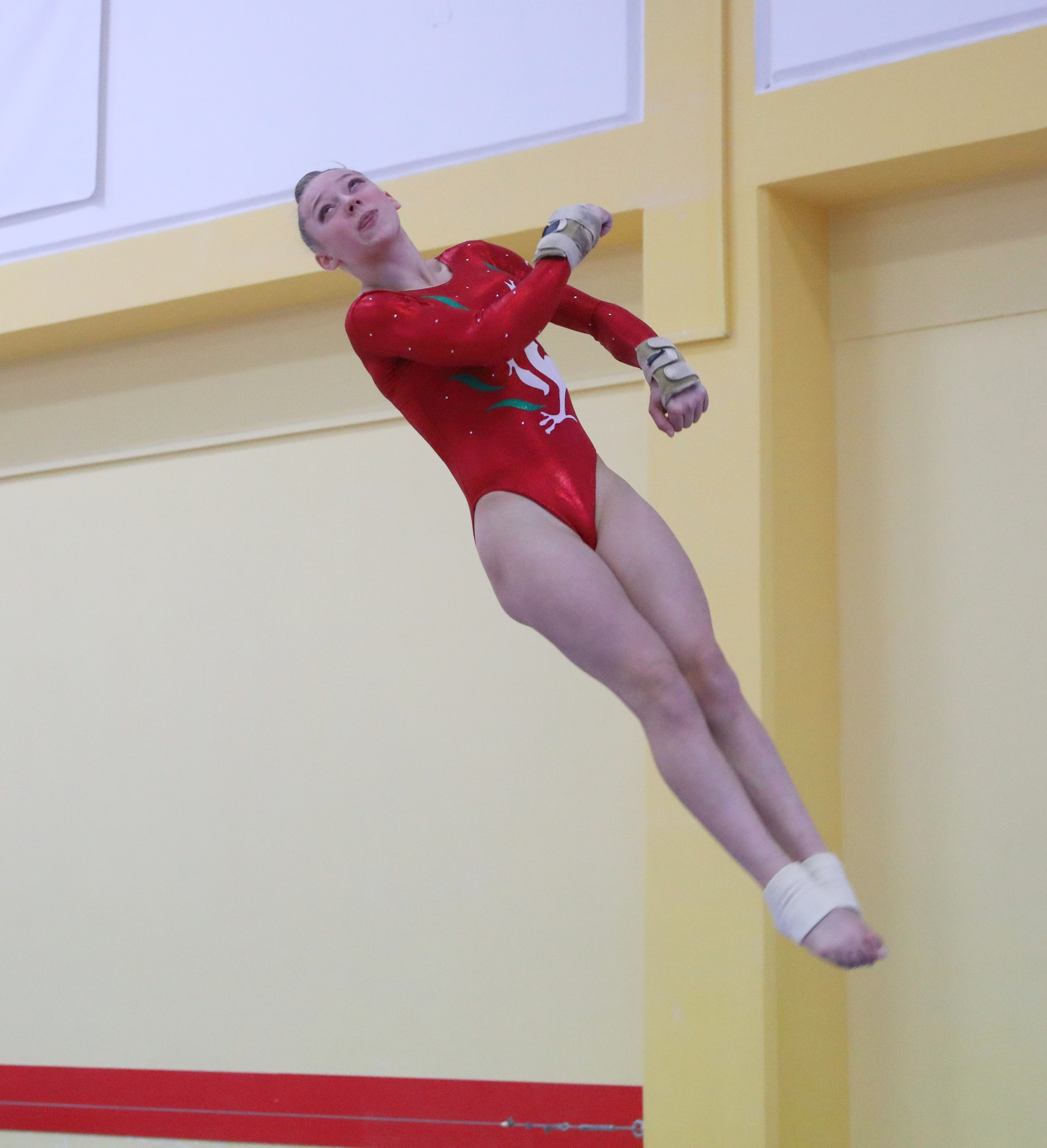
Vault

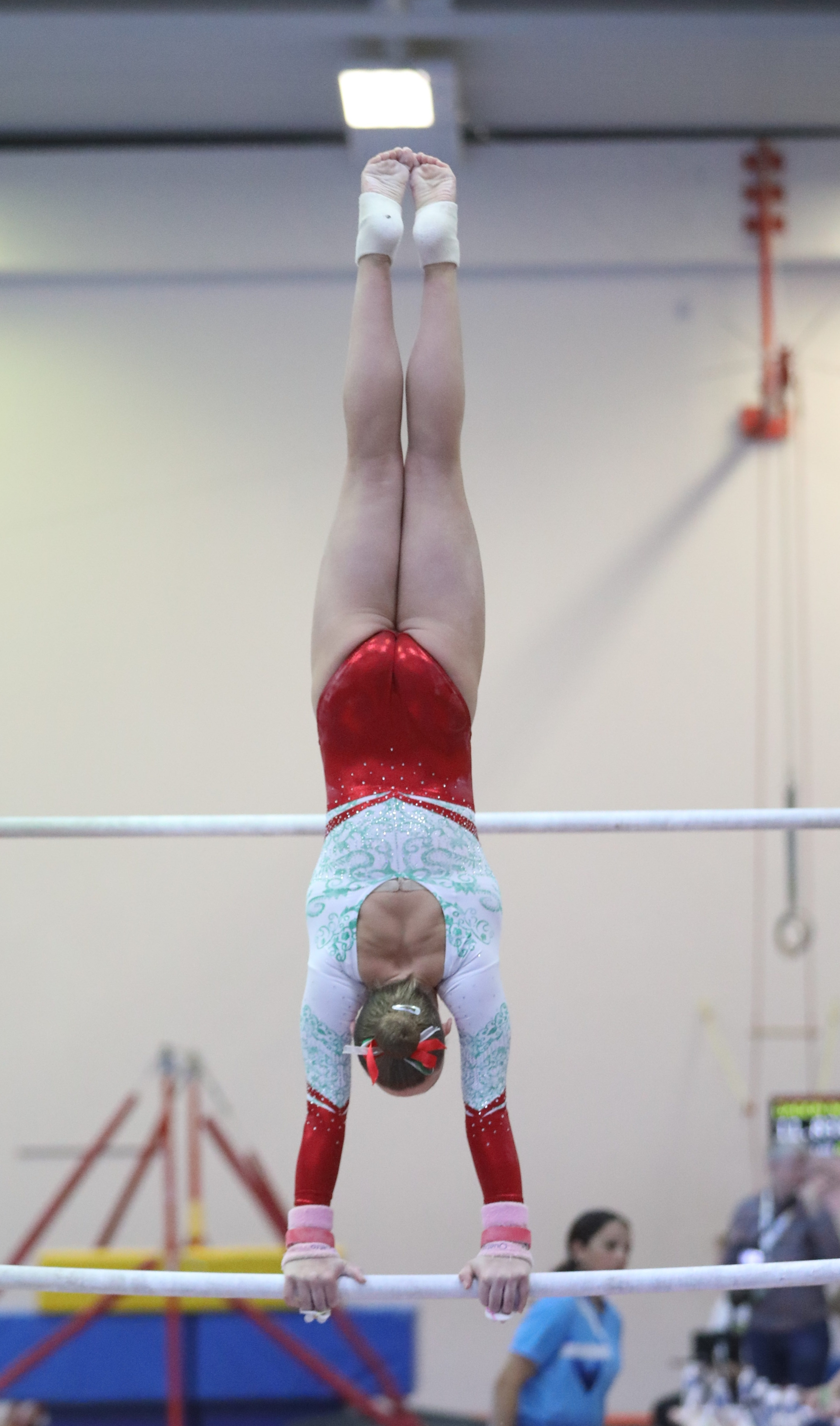
Uneven bars

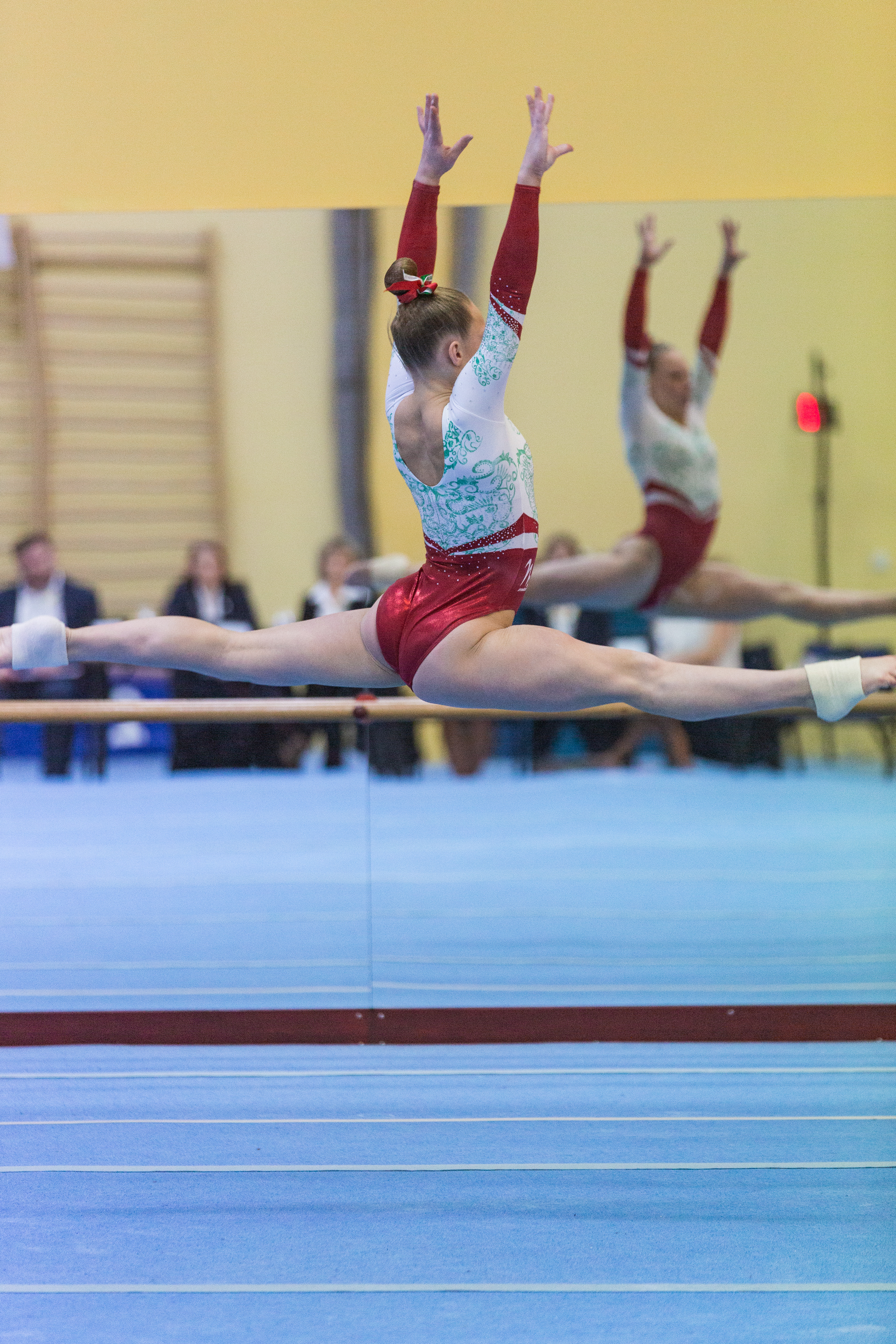
Floor exercise

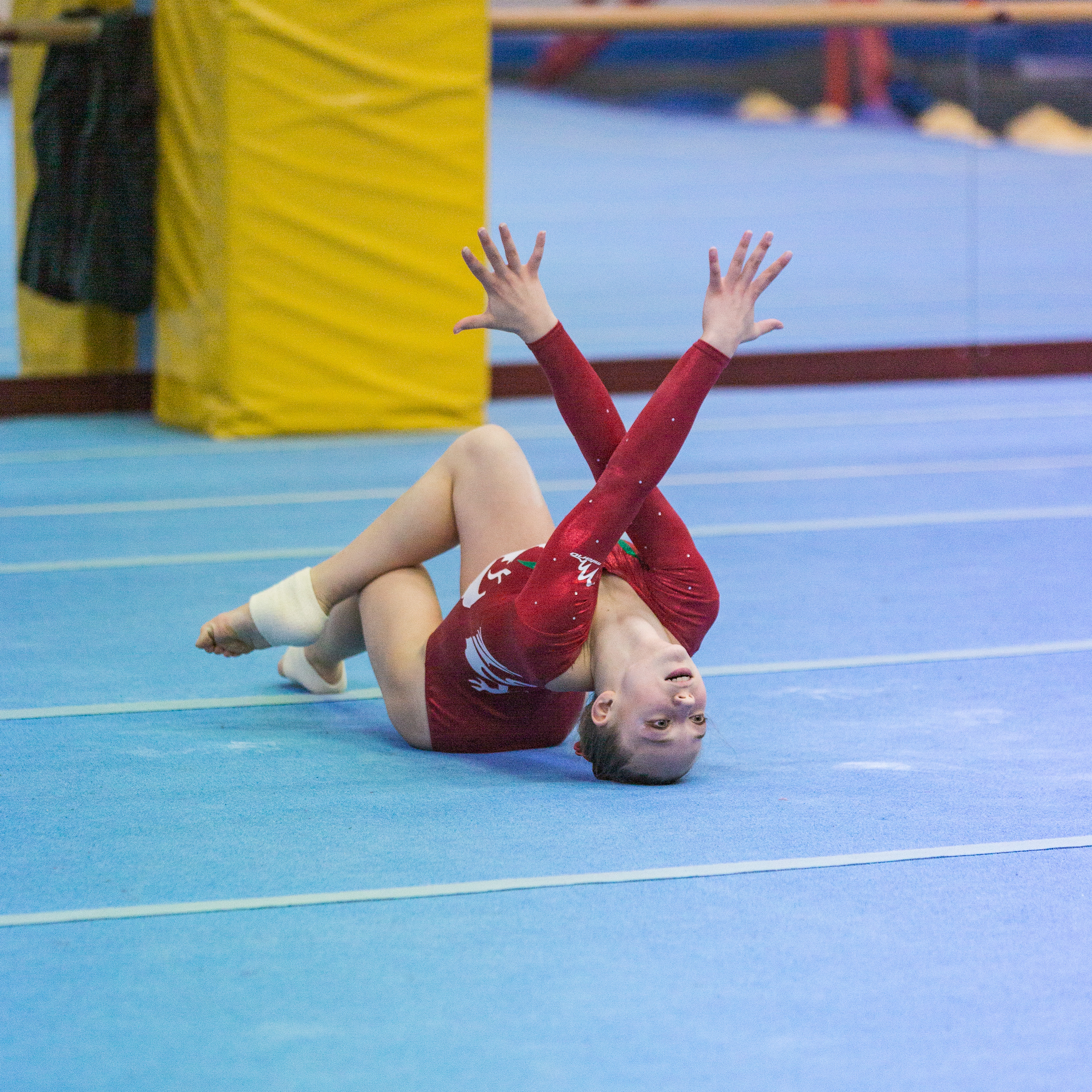
Floor exercise

Stickler at the 2019 Olympic Hopes Cup

=== Junior: 2020–21 ===
Due to the global COVID-19 pandemic most competitions were canceled or postponed in 2020. Stickler competed at the 2021 British Championships where she placed third in the all-around and first on vault and floor.

== Senior gymnastics career ==
=== 2022 ===
Stickler became age-eligible for senior competition in 2022. Early in the year she competed at the Welsh and British Championships, placing second in the all-around at the former and third on floor exercise at the latter. Stickler made her international senior debut for Great Britain at the Koper Challenge Cup. She won silver on floor exercise behind Ana Đerek.

Stickler was selected to represent Wales at the 2022 Commonwealth Games. While there she helped the team finish fifth. Individually she placed fifth in the all-around and sixth on floor exercise. Stickler next competed at the Paris Challenge Cup where she placed sixth on floor exercise.

In October Stickler was named as the alternate for the team competing at the 2022 World Championships. During the team final she was on the competition floor supporting the team who won a historic silver medal, Great Britain's highest finish at a World Championships.

=== 2023–24 ===
Stickler was named as the alternate for the team at the 2023 World Championships. She finished the year competing at the 2023 Northern European Championships. She helped Wales win the team competition and individually won bronze on the uneven bars.

In early January 2024 Stickler sustained an L5 fracture in her back and an avulsion fracture on her hip.

== Collegiate gymnastics career ==
On 22 November 2023 she signed her National Letter of Intent to attend the University of Utah and join the Utah Red Rocks gymnastics team for the 2025 season.

=== 2024–2025 season ===
In September 2024 Stickler officially joined the Utah Red Rocks gymnastics team. She did not compete during the 2025 season while she recovered from injury.

=== 2025–2026 season ===
In January 2026 Stickler made her NCAA debut for the Red Rocks in a tri-meet against Iowa Hawkeyes and Minnesota Golden Gophers, where she competed on floor scoring a 9.775. This marked her first competition since 2023, after her injury.

== Competitive history ==
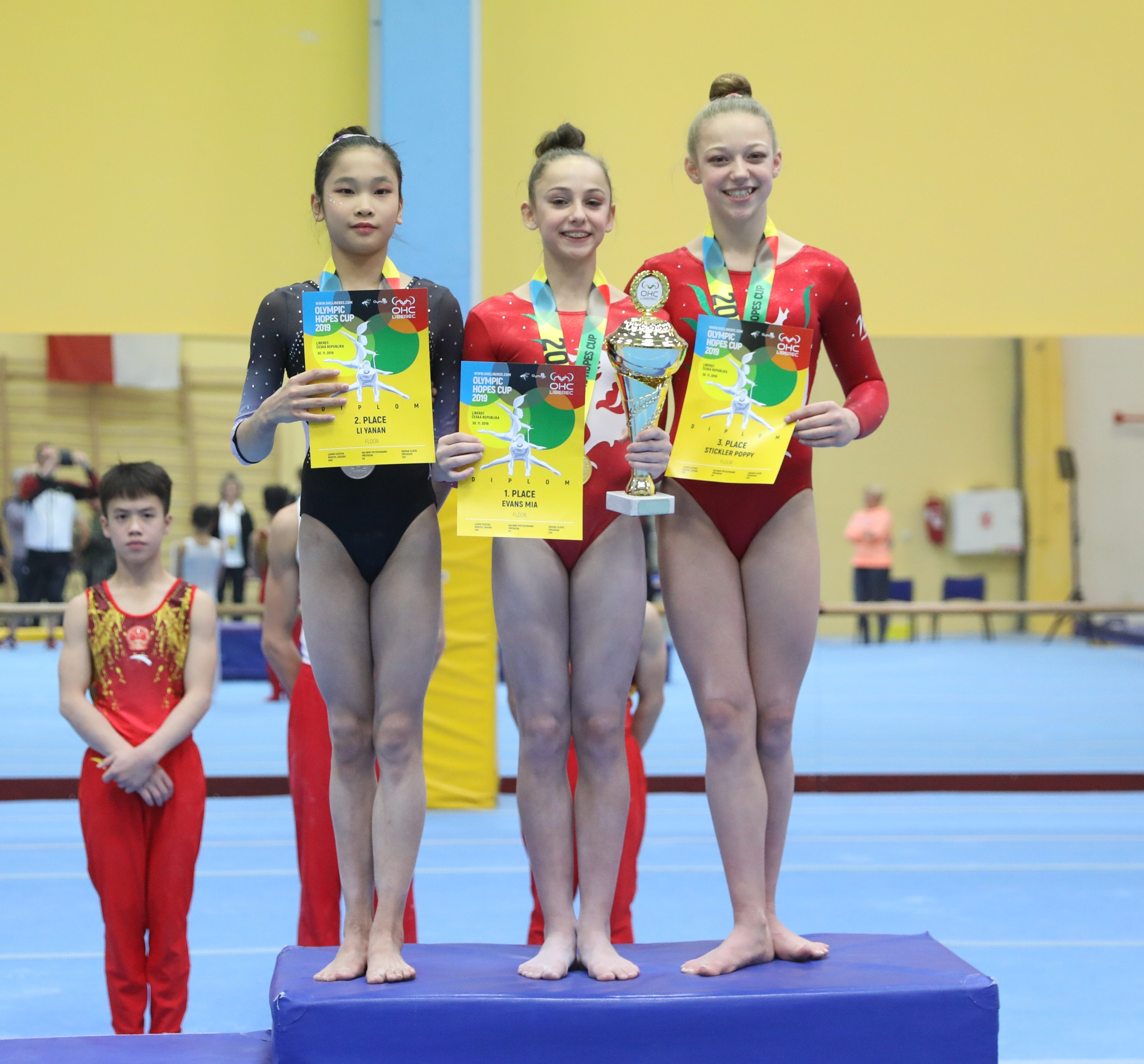
Stickler (right) at the 2019 Olympic Hopes Cup

Year	Event	Team	AA	VT	UB	BB	FX
Espoir
2017	Welsh Championships		4				
2018	British Championships		11			3rd place, bronze medalist(s)	
2018	Africa Safari International	2nd place, silver medalist(s)	7	4			5
2018	British Team Championships	1st place, gold medalist(s)	3rd place, bronze medalist(s)				
2019	Welsh Championships				1st place, gold medalist(s)	7	
2019	British Championships		3rd place, bronze medalist(s)	5		4	3rd place, bronze medalist(s)
2019	Pre-Olympic Youth Cup		1st place, gold medalist(s)				
2019	British Team Championships	3rd place, bronze medalist(s)	3rd place, bronze medalist(s)				
2019	Northern European Championships	1st place, gold medalist(s)	2nd place, silver medalist(s)			7	5
2019	Elite Gym Massilia		23				
2019	Olympic Hopes Cup	2nd place, silver medalist(s)	11	3rd place, bronze medalist(s)			3rd place, bronze medalist(s)
Junior
2021	British Championships		3rd place, bronze medalist(s)	1st place, gold medalist(s)			
Senior
2022	Welsh Championships		2nd place, silver medalist(s)		6	3rd place, bronze medalist(s)	2nd place, silver medalist(s)
2022	British Championships		11				3rd place, bronze medalist(s)
2022	Koper Challenge Cup						2nd place, silver medalist(s)
2022	Austrian Team Challenge	4	6				
2022	Commonwealth Games	5	5				6
2022	Paris Challenge Cup						6
2022	British Team Championships	2nd place, silver medalist(s)	7				
2022	World Championships	(silver) (Note: Stickler was the team GBR alternate)					
2023	Cottbus World Cup						7
2023	Welsh Championships		1st place, gold medalist(s)		1st place, gold medalist(s)	1st place, gold medalist(s)	2nd place, silver medalist(s)
2023	British Championships		4			6	2nd place, silver medalist(s)
2023	Osijek Challenge Cup			5	8	7	
2023	World Championships	6					
2023	Northern European Championships	1st place, gold medalist(s)			3rd place, bronze medalist(s)		
