= 2021 Northern European Gymnastics Championships =

2021 artistic gymnastic competition

- Venue: Sport Wales National Centre
- Location: Cardiff, Wales
- Start date: 13 November 2021
- End date: 14 November 2021

The 2021 Northern European Gymnastics Championships was an artistic gymnastics competition held in Cardiff, Wales. The event was held between the 13 November and 14 November 2021. The competition was set to be held in the same location in 2020, but was cancelled due to the COVID-19 pandemic.

== Medalists ==
Event	Gold	Silver	Bronze
Men
Team all-around	Wales; Brinn Bevan; Joe Cemlyn-Jones; Benjamin Eyre; Alex Niscoveanu; Jacob Edwards; Emil Barber	Norway; Sofus Heggemsnes; Fredrik Bjornevik Aas; Jacob Gudim Karlsen; Nore Skulesson Stene; Peder Skogvang; Niklas Morton Syverhuset	Finland; Tarmo Kanerva; Emil Woivalin; Akseli Karsikas; Joona Reiman; Pavel Titov; Antti Varjolaakso
Individual all-around	Joe Cemlyn-Jones (WAL)	Cameron Lynn (SCO)	Alex Niscoveanu (WAL)
Floor	Joe Cemlyn-Jones (WAL)	Michael O'Neill (IRE)	Jonas Ingi Thorisson (ISL)
Pommel horse	Joe Cemlyn-Jones (WAL)	Alex Niscoveanu (WAL)	Cameron Lynn (SCO)
Rings	Daniel Fox (IRE)	Luis Ii-Sung Melander (SWE) Sofus Heggemsnes (NOR)	Not awarded
Vault	Ewan Mcateer (IRE)	Joona Reiman (FIN)	Cameron Lynn (SCO)
Parallel bars	Brinn Bevan (WAL)	Joona Reiman (FIN)	Joe Cemlyn-Jones (WAL)
Horizontal bar	Sofus Heggemsnes (NOR)	Tarmo Kanerva (FIN)	Benjamin Eyre (WAL)
Women
Team all-around	England; Mia Evans; Tommera Hendricks; Emily Todd; Jess Adamson; Megan Bridge; Dixie Lindsay	Norway; Juliane Tøssebro; Mali Trongmo Neurauter; Selma Andrea Halvorsen; Edel Charlotte Eiken Fosse; Selma Gudim Karlsen; Amalie Norvang Dalene	Finland; Rosanna Ojala; Sani Mäkelä; Sara Loikas; Saara Kokko; Iida Haapala; Olivia Vättö
Individual all-around	Emily Bremner (SCO)	Megan Bridge (ENG)	Emily Todd (ENG)
Vault	Sara Bergmann Jacobsen (DEN)	Holly Jones (WAL)	Sani Mäkelä (FIN)
Uneven bars	Iida Haapala (FIN)	Lottie Smith (ENG)	Edel Charlotte Eiken Fosse (NOR)
Balance beam	Megan Bridge (ENG)	Juliane Tøssebro (NOR)	Selma Andrea Halvorsen (NOR)
Floor	Tara Donnelly (IOM)	Juliane Tøssebro (NOR) Margret Lea Kristindottir (ISL)	Not awarded

== Medal table ==
Rank	Nation	Gold	Silver	Bronze	Total
1	Wales (WAL)	5	2	3	10
2	England (ENG)	2	2	1	5
3	Ireland (IRL)	2	1	0	3
4	Norway (NOR)	1	5	2	8
5	Finland (FIN)	1	3	3	7
6	Scotland (SCO)	1	1	2	4
7	Denmark (DEN)	1	0	0	1
7	Isle of Man (IOM)	1	0	0	1
9	Iceland (ISL)	0	1	1	2
10	Sweden (SWE)	0	1	0	1
Totals (10 entries)		14	16	12	42
