= Rhys McClenaghan =

Northern Irish artistic gymnast (born 1999)

Rhys McClenaghan MBE BEM
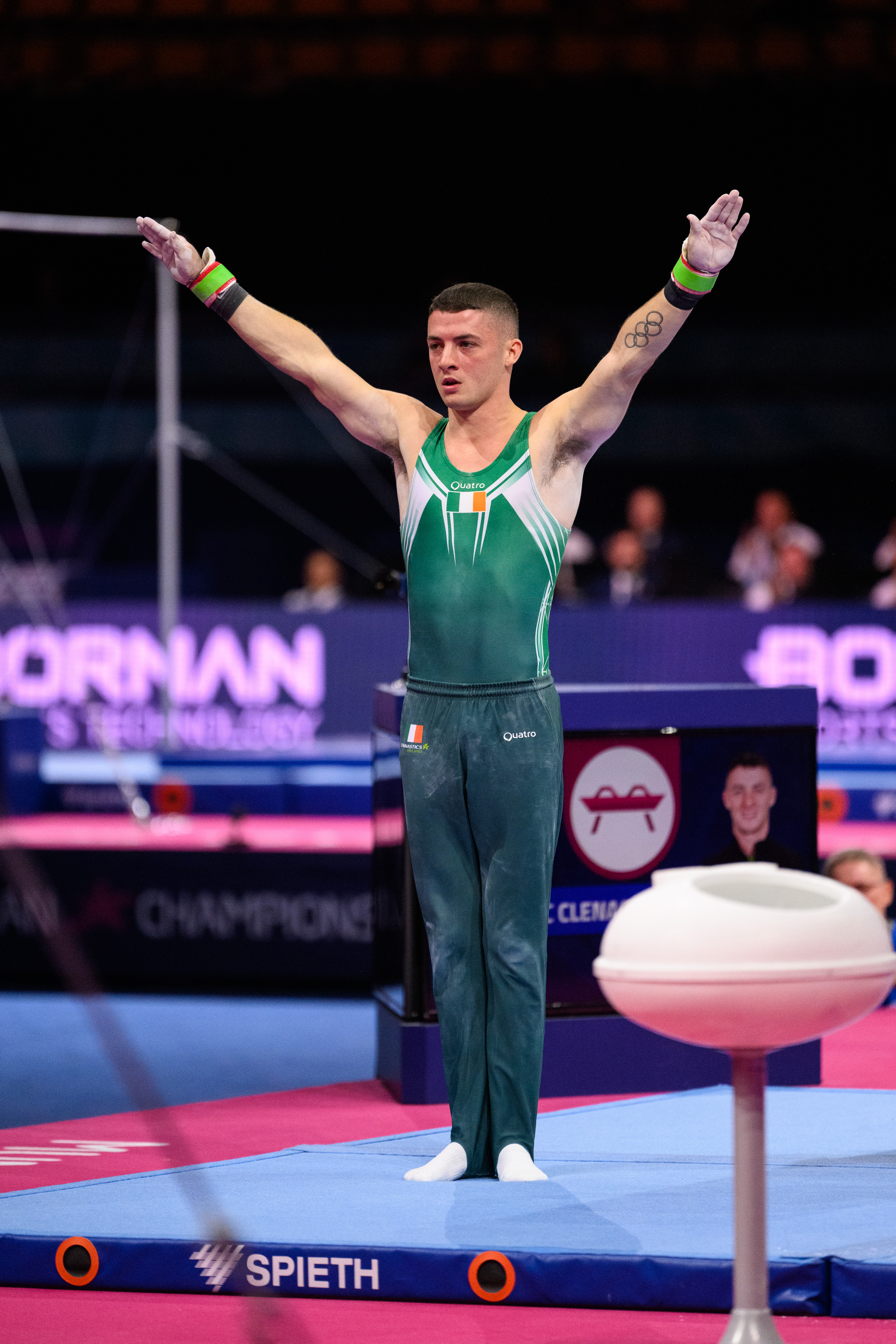
- McClenaghan in 2022

Personal information
- Full name: Rhys Joshua McClenaghan
- Born: 21 July 1999 (age 27) Newtownards, County Down, Northern Ireland
- Height: 173 cm (5 ft 8 in)

Gymnastics career
- Discipline: Men's artistic gymnastics
- Country represented: (Republic of Ireland) Ireland Northern Ireland
- Club: Origin Gymnastics
- Former coach: Luke Carson
Medal record
Men's artistic gymnastics
Event	1st	2nd	3rd
Olympic Games	1	0	0
World Championships	2	0	1
European Championships	3	0	0
Commonwealth Games	1	1	0
N. European Championships	1	0	1
Total	8	1	2
Representing Ireland
Olympic Games
Gold medal – first place	2024 Paris	Pommel horse
World Championships
Gold medal – first place	2022 Liverpool	Pommel Horse
Gold medal – first place	2023 Antwerp	Pommel Horse
Bronze medal – third place	2019 Stuttgart	Pommel Horse
European Championships
Gold medal – first place	2018 Glasgow	Pommel Horse
Gold medal – first place	2023 Antalya	Pommel Horse
Gold medal – first place	2024 Rimini	Pommel Horse
Northern European Championships
Gold medal – first place	2015 Limerick	Team
Bronze medal – third place	2015 Limerick	Pommel Horse
Representing Northern Ireland
Commonwealth Games
Gold medal – first place	2018 Gold Coast	Pommel Horse
Silver medal – second place	2022 Birmingham	Pommel Horse
FIG World Cup
Event	1st	2nd	3rd
World Cup	2	4	1
World Challenge Cup	4	1	0
Total	6	5	1

Rhys Joshua McClenaghan (born 21 July 1999) is an artistic gymnast from Northern Ireland who competes internationally both for Ireland and Northern Ireland. McClenaghan is widely recognised as one of the best pommel horse specialists of his generation.

He is the 2024 pommel horse Olympic champion and the first gymnast to win an Olympic medal for Ireland. McClenaghan is also a double world champion on the pommel horse, having won gold in 2022 and 2023. He is the first Irish artistic gymnast to win world championship gold, having also been the first Irish gymnast to win a world medal with bronze in 2019. He is a three-time European champion representing Ireland (2018, 2023, 2024) and a Commonwealth Games champion representing Northern Ireland. McClenaghan was the first Irish gymnast to compete in a European final and also the first to win any European medal. He is the only gymnast to become Olympic, World, European and Commonwealth champion on a single apparatus.

McClenaghan was named RTÉ's Sportsperson of the Year for 2023. Along with dance partner Laura Nolan he won the 8th series of Dancing with the Stars in March 2025.

He missed all gymnastic competitions in 2025 due to injury.

== Early life ==
McClenaghan was born and raised in Newtownards, County Down, to Tracy, a nursery school teacher, and Danny McClenaghan, a builder. He has an older brother, Elliot.

By age six, he already displayed a precocious aptitude for gymnastics and started training at Rathgael Gymnastics Club in Bangor. McClenaghan later attended Regent House School in Newtownards. He was coached by close friend Luke Carson for many years until November 2026.

== Career ==
As an athlete from Northern Ireland, McClenaghan is eligible to compete for either Great Britain or Ireland in international competition, and for Northern Ireland at the Commonwealth Games only. Though he competed in the British gymnastics system as a youth, he opted to compete for Ireland in international competition, saying, "Gymnastics Ireland supported me the most, and that’s what made me go that route."

While still technically a junior, he won the bronze medal in the 2016 British Artistic Gymnastics Championships pommel horse final behind Olympic medalists Louis Smith and Max Whitlock. McClenaghan also won Ireland's first European Championships medal, earning silver on the pommel horse at the 2016 Junior European Gymnastics Championship.

At the 2018 Commonwealth Games held at the Gold Coast, Australia, McClenaghan won gold on the pommel horse, beating reigning world and Olympic champion Whitlock by dint of higher execution score, after tying on overall scores. It was Northern Ireland's first medal for an artistic gymnast at the Commonwealth Games. At the 2018 European Championships, McClenaghan won the gold medal and became Ireland's first-ever European champion.

After his coach, Luke Carson, was made redundant by the Rathgael club in June 2018, McClenaghan was forced to train in his back garden for a short period. He then relocated to Dublin during the week, upon receiving funding and accommodation from Gymnastics Ireland and Sport Ireland to train in the Sport Ireland Institute in Abbotstown.

In October 2019, he won Ireland's first World Championship medal, bronze on the pommel horse, making him the most decorated Irish gymnast of all time.

McClenaghan was awarded the British Empire Medal (BEM) in the 2021 New Year Honours for services to gymnastics.

McClenaghan competed in the Tokyo 2020 Olympics, where he came in seventh place in the men's pommel horse final.

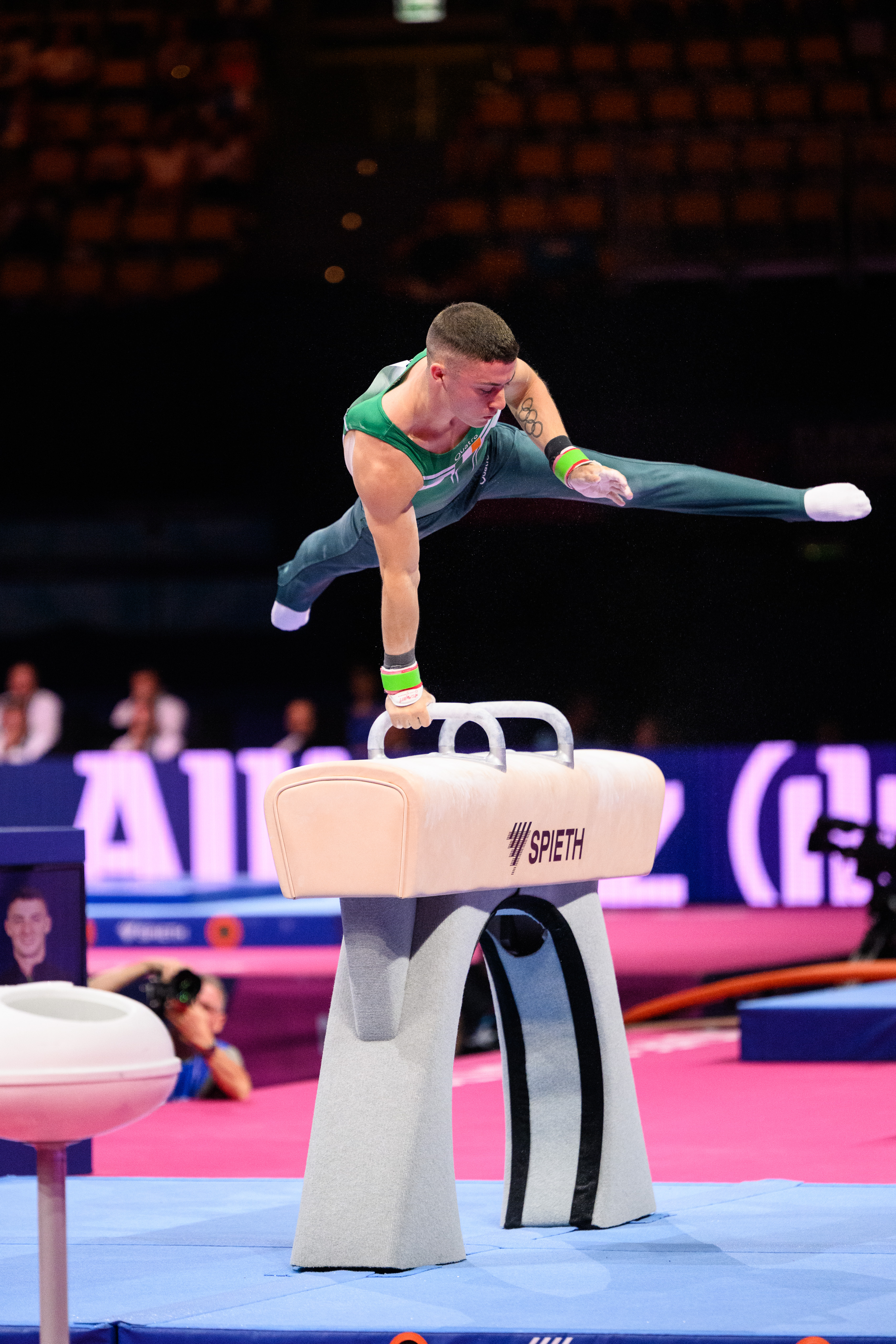
McClenaghan at the 2022 European Championships

In 2022 McClenaghan, along with fellow gymnasts Eamon Montgomery and Ewan McAteer, was banned from competing for Northern Ireland at the 2022 Commonwealth Games by the International Gymnastics Federation (FIG) as he had previously competed internationally for Ireland. The FIG suggested the trio should renounce their Irish nationality on their gymnastics licences, or that the Commonwealth Games Federation remove the relevant event from that summer's Games programme. The decision was met with backlash from politicians including Sir Brandon Lewis, Deirdre Hargey and Leo Varadkar, as well as from Commonwealth Games NI, which accused the FIG of "completely disregarding" the Good Friday Agreement, which recognised the right of Northern Irish people to be both British and Irish (McClenaghan had competed regularly at both the British and the Irish national championships.). The trio were ultimately given special dispensation by the FIG allowing them to compete in Birmingham.

McClenaghan resumed training in his home town of Newtownards when Carson opened a new gym in spring 2023.

At the 2024 Summer Olympics, McClenaghan won the gold medal in the pommel horse, with a score of 15.533. It was the first-ever Olympic gymnastics medal for Ireland. Thrice Olympic pommel horse medallist Louis Smith, who was commentating for BBC 5Live, called McClenaghan's performance "the routine of his life".

McClenaghan was unable to compete at all in 2025 due to injury and shoulder surgery undertaken in June of that year; he missed both the European and World Championships.

McClenaghan was appointed Member of the Order of the British Empire (MBE) in the 2026 New Year Honours for services to gymnastics.

In January 2026, he was awarded the freedom of the Borough of Ards and North Down.

== Media career ==
He competed in series 8 of Dancing with the Stars alongside professional dance partner Laura Nolan. On 16 March 2025 the pair were announced as winners of the show.

Week No.	Dance/Song	Judges' score				Total	Result
Week No.	Dance/Song	Redmond	Byrne	Barry	Gourounlian	Total	Result
1	Salsa / ''Head & Heart''	7	8	8	8	31	No Elimination
2	Tango / ''Tanguera''	8	8	8	8	32	No Elimination
3	Cha-cha-cha / ''Treasure''	7	8	7	8	30	Safe
4	Charleston / Spider-Man	9	10		10	29/30	Safe
5	Jive / ''Gold Dust''	8	8	8	9	33	No Elimination
6	Quickstep / ''Fairytale''	9	10	10	10	39	Safe
7	Rumba / ''Love Me Like You Do''	7	8	8	8	31	Safe
8	Contemporary Ballroom / ''Bitter Sweet Symphony''	9	10	10	10	39	Safe
9	American Smooth / ''Wagon Wheel''	9	10	10	10	39	Safe
9	Team Freestyle / ''Timber''	9	10	10	10	39	Safe
10	Paso Doble / ''O Fortuna''	10	10	10	10	45	Safe
10	Scare-a-thon / ''Time Wrap''	5				45	Safe
Final	Charleston / Spider-Man	10	10	10	10	40	Winners
Final	Showdance / ''Beautiful Things''	10	10	10	10	40	Winners

== Competitive history ==
Competitive history of Rhys McClenaghan
Year	Event	Team	AA	FX	PH	SR	VT	PB	HB
2015	Northern European Championships	1st place, gold medalist(s)			3rd place, bronze medalist(s)				
2016
2016	Junior European Championships		13		2nd place, silver medalist(s)				
2017	Baku World Cup				10				
2017	Osijek Challenge Cup				1st place, gold medalist(s)				
2017	World Championships				14				
2018	Doha World Cup				4				
2018	Commonwealth Games				1st place, gold medalist(s)				
2018	Mersin Challenge Cup				1st place, gold medalist(s)				
2018	European Championships				1st place, gold medalist(s)				
2018	World Championships				113				
2019	Zhaoqing Challenge Cup				2nd place, silver medalist(s)				
2019	Irish Championships				2nd place, silver medalist(s)				
2019	Koper Challenge Cup				1st place, gold medalist(s)				
2019	Irish Super Championships				1st place, gold medalist(s)				
2019	Paris Challenge Cup				9				
2019	World Championships				3rd place, bronze medalist(s)				
2021
2021	European Championships				5				
2021	Olympic Games				7				
2021	World Championships				24				
2022	Doha World Cup				2nd place, silver medalist(s)				
2022	Cairo World Cup				1st place, gold medalist(s)				
2022	Baku World Cup				13				
2022	Irish Championships			4	1st place, gold medalist(s)				
2022	Commonwealth Games	11			2nd place, silver medalist(s)				
2022	European Championships				9				
2022	Paris Challenge Cup				1st place, gold medalist(s)				
2022	World Championships				1st place, gold medalist(s)				
2023	Cottbus World Cup				5				
2023	Doha World Cup				2nd place, silver medalist(s)				
2023	Baku World Cup				2nd place, silver medalist(s)				
2023	European Championships				1st place, gold medalist(s)				
2023	Paris Challenge Cup				2nd place, silver medalist(s)				
2023	World Championships				1st place, gold medalist(s)				
2024	Doha World Cup				3rd place, bronze medalist(s)				
2024	European Championships				1st place, gold medalist(s)				
2024	Olympic Games				1st place, gold medalist(s)				
2026	Antalya World Cup				1st place, gold medalist(s)				
2026	Commonwealth Games			23	6				
2026	European Championships				7				
