= 2019 Northern European Gymnastics Championships =

International gymnastics competition

- Location: Kópavogur, Iceland
- Start date: 21 September 2019
- End date: 22 September 2019

The 2019 Northern European Gymnastics Championships was an artistic gymnastics competition held in Kópavogur, Iceland. The event was held between 21 and 22 September.

== Medalists ==
Event	Gold	Silver	Bronze
Men
Team all-around	Norway; Sofus Heggemsnes; Odin Kalvø; Stian Skjerahaug; Harald Wibye	Wales; Emil Barber; Brinn Bevan; Joe Cemlyn-Jones; Josh Cook; Jacob Edwards	Scotland; Kelvin Cham; Cameron Lister; Cameron Lynn; Rory Smith; David Weir
Individual all-around	Sofus Heggemsnes (NOR)	Joe Cemlyn-Jones (WAL)	Stian Skjerahaug (NOR)
Floor	Sofus Heggemsnes (NOR)	Kelvin Cham (SCO) Jonas Thorisson (ISL)	—N/a
Pommel horse	Brinn Bevan (WAL)	Stian Skjerahaug (NOR)	Sofus Heggemsnes (NOR) Joe Cemlyn-Jones (WAL)
Rings	Josh Cook (WAL)	Sofus Heggemsnes (NOR)	Joe Cemlyn-Jones (WAL)
Vault	Emil Barber (WAL)	Rani Dalsgarð (FRO)	Jonas Thorisson (ISL)
Parallel bars	Joe Cemlyn-Jones (WAL)	Sofus Heggemsnes (NOR)	Josh Cook (WAL)
Horizontal bar	Joe Cemlyn-Jones (WAL)	Sofus Heggemsnes (NOR)	Valgard Reinhardsson (ISL)
Women
Team all-around	Wales; Mia Evans; Holly Jones; Jea Maracha; Poppy Stickler; Emily Thomas	Norway; Nora Irgens; Mari Kanter; Mali Neurauter; Marie Rønbeck; Juliane Tøssebro	Finland; Lea Bernards; Iida Haapala; Enni Kettunen; Lilian Langenskiöld; Malla Montell
Individual all-around	Emily Thomas (WAL)	Poppy Stickler (WAL)	Camille Rasmussen (DEN)
Vault	Camille Rasmussen (DEN)	Holly Jones (WAL)	Irina Sazonova (ISL)
Uneven bars	Emily Thomas (WAL)	Irina Sazonova (ISL)	Mari Kanter (NOR) Ellie Russell (SCO)
Balance beam	Jea Maracha (WAL)	Mari Kanter (NOR)	Lea Bernards (FIN) Juliane Tøssebro (NOR)
Floor	Emily Thomas (WAL)	Irina Sazonova (ISL)	Juliane Tøssebro (NOR)

== Medal table ==
Rank	Nation	Gold	Silver	Bronze	Total
1	Wales (WAL)	10	4	3	17
2	Norway (NOR)	3	6	5	14
3	Denmark (DEN)	1	0	1	2
4	Iceland (ISL)	0	3	3	6
5	Scotland (SCO)	0	1	2	3
6	Faroe Islands (FRO)	0	1	0	1
7	Finland (FIN)	0	0	2	2
Totals (7 entries)		14	15	16	45
