= Irina Sazonova =

Russian-Icelandic artistic gymnast

- Full name: Ирина Сазонова
- Born: 2 September 1991 (age 35) Vologda, Russian SFSR, Soviet Union
- Height: 5 ft 3 in (160 cm)

Gymnastics career
- Discipline: Women's artistic gymnastics
- Country represented: Iceland (2005–12 (RUS); 2014–Present (ISL))
- Former countries represented: Russia
- Club: Fimleikadeild Armanns
- Head coaches: Hildur Ketilsdottir, Vladimir Antonov
- Former coaches: Svetlana Kolomenskaya, Yuri Kolomensky
Medal record
Women's gymnastics
Representing Russia
Summer Universiade
Bronze medal – third place	2011 Shenzhen	Team
Representing Iceland
Northern European Championships
Gold medal – first place	2014 Greve	Uneven Bars
Gold medal – first place	2015 Limerick	Uneven Bars
Silver medal – second place	2017 Tórshavn	Team
Silver medal – second place	2017 Tórshavn	All-Around
Silver medal – second place	2019 Kópavogur	Uneven Bars
Silver medal – second place	2019 Kópavogur	Floor Exercise
Bronze medal – third place	2015 Limerick	Team
Bronze medal – third place	2015 Limerick	Floor Exercise
Bronze medal – third place	2019 Kópavogur	Vault

Irina Sazonova (born 2 September 1991) is a Russian-born Icelandic female artistic gymnast, currently representing Iceland at international competitions. Prior to her move to Iceland, she represented Russia at the 2011 Summer Universiade. She represented Iceland at the 2015 Northern European and World Championships and became the first female Icelandic gymnast at the Olympics, competing in Rio de Janeiro in 2016. She currently resides in Reykjavík and trains at Fimleikadeild Armanns.

As a Russian athlete, she competed at the 2009 Russian Artistic Gymnastics Championships, 2010 Russian Artistic Gymnastics Championships and 2011 Summer Universiade. Representing Iceland, she competed at the 2015 World Artistic Gymnastics Championships in Glasgow. She became the first Icelandic female to book an Olympic spot in the apparatus and all-around events at the Olympic Test Event in Rio de Janeiro.

== Career ==
=== Russia ===
Sazonova made her international debut as a junior, competing at the 2005 WOGA Classic in Texas. She won bronze on vault, and placed fifth in the all-around and floor exercise, sixth on uneven bars, and thirteenth on balance beam. As a senior, she competed at the Russian Championships in 2010, winning team bronze, and placing fifth on floor and thirteenth in the all-around. She was sent to compete at the Cottbus World Cup the following year, but did not make the event finals. Later that year, she competed at the Universiade, winning team bronze, and placing sixth on uneven bars and seventh in the all-around.

=== Iceland ===
Sazonova made the move to Iceland in 2014, with her change in nationality and international representation becoming official later that year. Her first international competition representing Iceland was the Voronin Cup in her native Russia, but she did not make the event finals. The following year, she competed at the Northern European Championships, winning uneven bars gold, floor exercise bronze, and placing fourth in the all-around. She also competed at the World Championships in Glasgow, Scotland, but did not make the event finals. At the Voronin Cup at the end of the year, she placed sixth in the all-around and uneven bars and eighth on balance beam.

In April 2016, she competed at the Olympic Test Event. She placed thirty-ninth in the all-around, qualifying as an individual for the Olympics. She later competed at the Nordic Championships, winning team and uneven bars gold, vault silver, and placing fifth in the all-around. In June, she competed at the European Championships in Switzerland, but did not make the event finals.

==== Rio Olympics ====
Sazonova competed in the fourth subdivision of qualifications, starting on vault. She placed fortieth in the all-around, fifty-eighth on uneven bars, sixtieth on floor exercise, and sixty-fourth on balance beam.

Following Rio, she placed sixth on uneven bars and seventh on vault at the Cottbus World Cup in November. In December, she competed at the Voronin Cup, winning silver on vault, bronze on bars and beam, and placing fourth in the all-around and sixth with her team and on floor.

== Competitive history ==
Year	Event	TF	AA	VT	UB	BB	FX
2005	WOGA Classic		5	3rd place, bronze medalist(s)	6	13	5
2010	Russian Championships	3rd place, bronze medalist(s)	13				5
2010	Stuttgart World Cup						6
2011	Shenzhen Summer Universiade	3rd place, bronze medalist(s)	7		6		
2014	Voronin Cup		3				
2015	Northern European Championships		4		1st place, gold medalist(s)		3rd place, bronze medalist(s)
2015	World Championships		98				
2015	Voronin Cup		6		6	8	
2016	Icelandic Championships		1st place, gold medalist(s)		2nd place, silver medalist(s)	1st place, gold medalist(s)	1st place, gold medalist(s)
2016	Olympic Test Event		39				
2016	GK Championships		1st place, gold medalist(s)				
2016	Nordic Championships	1st place, gold medalist(s)	5	2nd place, silver medalist(s)	1st place, gold medalist(s)		
2016	European Championships	14					
2016	Olympic Games		40				
2016	TM Tournament			6		6	3rd place, bronze medalist(s)
2016	Iceland Fall Cup		1st place, gold medalist(s)				
2016	Cottbus World Cup			7	6		
2016	Turnkunst International	4	2nd place, silver medalist(s)				
2016	Voronin Cup	6	4	2nd place, silver medalist(s)	3rd place, bronze medalist(s)	3rd place, bronze medalist(s)	6
2017	Icelandic Team Championships	3rd place, bronze medalist(s)	2nd place, silver medalist(s)				
2017	Icelandic Championships		1st place, gold medalist(s)	1st place, gold medalist(s)	6	1st place, gold medalist(s)	2nd place, silver medalist(s)
2017	European Championships		39				
2017	GK Championships		2nd place, silver medalist(s)				
2017	World Championships		37				
2017	Northern European Championships	2nd place, silver medalist(s)	2nd place, silver medalist(s)		5	8	7
2017	Voronin Cup		3rd place, bronze medalist(s)		3rd place, bronze medalist(s)	8	5
2018	Reykjavík International Games		2nd place, silver medalist(s)				
2018	Icelandic Team Championships	2nd place, silver medalist(s)	2nd place, silver medalist(s)				
2018	Icelandic Championships		1st place, gold medalist(s)		1st place, gold medalist(s)	3rd place, bronze medalist(s)	2nd place, silver medalist(s)
2019	Northern European Championships	4	5	3rd place, bronze medalist(s)	2nd place, silver medalist(s)	2nd place, silver medalist(s)	
2019	World Championships		110				

== See also ==
- Nationality changes in gymnastics
