= Marie Skammelsen =

Danish artistic gymnast (born 2001)

- Born: 22 February 2001 (age 25) Rudersdal, Denmark

Gymnastics career
- Discipline: Women's artistic gymnastics
- Country represented: Denmark (2010–2017)
- Training location: Kastrup, Denmark
- Club: Kastrup Gymnastikforening af 1966 (KG66)
- Head coach: Bernadett "Ditti" Balazs
- Assistant coach: Milan Udvaracz
- Retired: October 2017

Marie Skammelsen (born 22 February 2001) is a Danish retired artistic gymnast. A Danish national team member since 2010, joining at an unprecedented age of nine, she has amassed several medals at the Northern European Gymnastics Championships as a junior, including her all-around title at the 2016 event. In June 2016, she finished fourth in the vault final at the 2016 European Artistic Gymnastics Championships in Bern, Switzerland.

== Junior career: 2014–2016 ==
=== 2014 ===
In September, Skammelsen competed at the 2014 Northern European Gymnastics Championships, which were held in Greve, Denmark. With her team, she took a silver medal, and an eleventh-place finish in the all-around standings. She advanced to the vault event final and finished in second-place position.

=== 2015 ===
Skammelsen participated in the 2015 European Youth Summer Olympic Festival in the summer of 2015, where she travelled to Tbilisi, Georgia. In the qualification round, she finished thirty-sixth which didn't advance her through to the all-around final; she did make the vault final though. In the vault final, she finished fifth.

Later in the year, in mid-September, Skammelsen participated in the 2015 Northern European Gymnastics Championships in Limerick, Ireland. She took an eighth-place finish in the all-around standings, in addition to three event finals. In the event finals, Skammelsen took home two bronze medals; one on vault and one on balance beam, as well as a fourth-place finish on floor.

=== 2016 ===
Skammelsen became the Danish Junior Champion in the all-around in April. She claimed additional titles on the vault and floor too.

In May, she travelled to Reykjavík, Iceland for the 2016 Nordic Championships. At the championships, she was crowned the junior Nordic all-around champion. She also captured Junior Nordic titles on vault and floor, in addition to medals on the remaining two events.

A month later, in June, she journeyed to Bern for the 2016 European Artistic Gymnastics Championships. The qualification round saw Skammelsen advance to the all-around final in one of the final qualification spots. She also qualified to the vault event final, taking the seventh place in the quota. In the all-around final, Skammelsen finished twentieth in the field of twenty-four. Soon after, she participated in the vault final where she over-performed to a finish of fourth place.

== Senior career: 2017–present ==
As of October 2017, she now longer practises gymnastics.
