= Tara Donnelly =

Manx artistic gymnast

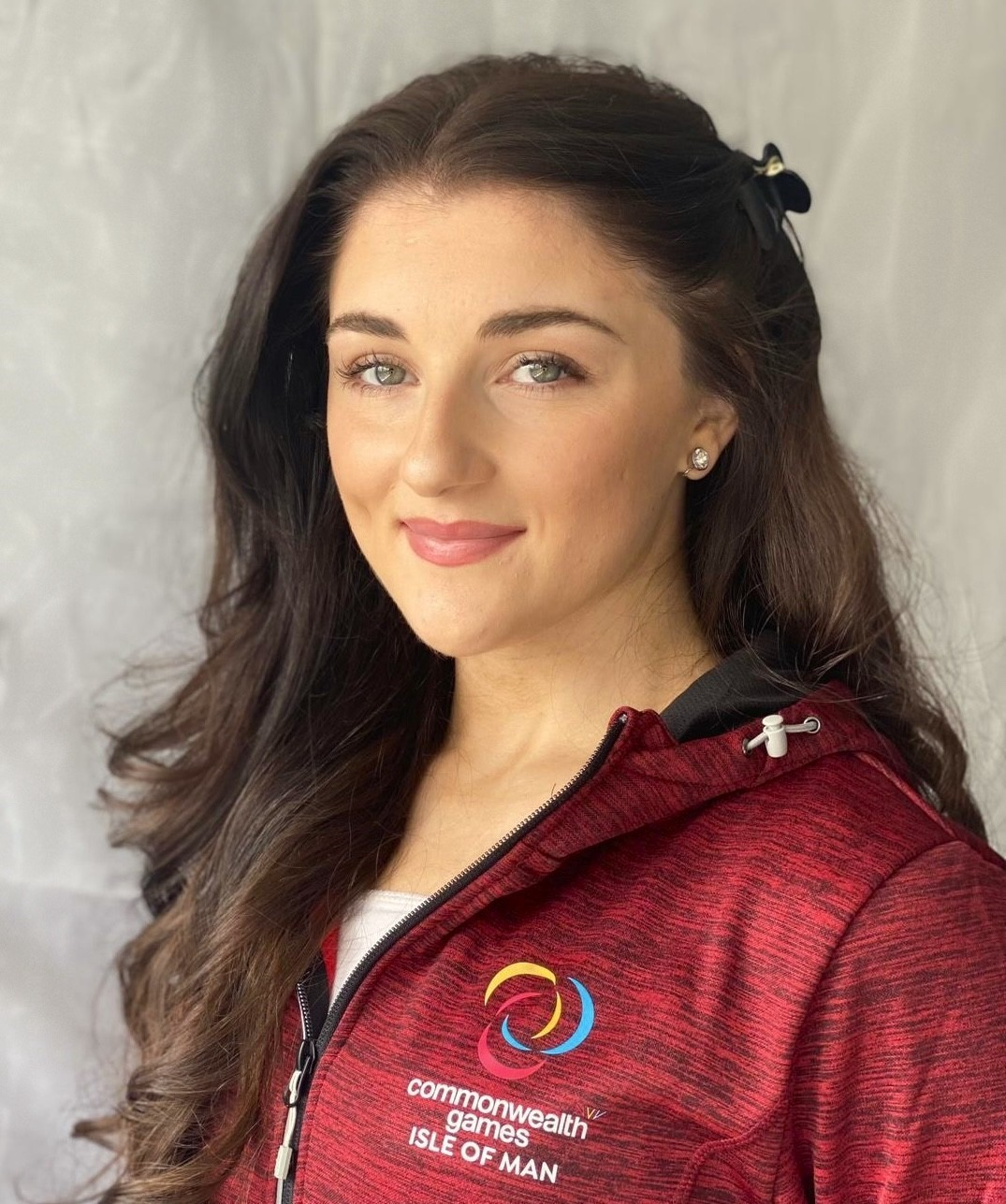
- Donnelly at the 2022 Commonwealth Games

Personal information
- Full name: Tara Megan Donnelly
- Born: December 25, 1998 (age 27) Isle of Man
- Height: 162 cm (5 ft 4 in)

Gymnastics career
- Country represented: Isle of Man; (2013–2023)
- Former countries represented: (Republic of Ireland) Ireland (2015–2018)
- Club: Ellan Vannin
- Education: Loughborough University
- Head coach: Valery Molchanov
- Retired: 4 February 2024
Medal record
Representing Isle of Man
Northern European Championships
Gold medal – first place	2021 Cardiff	Floor Exercise
Island Games
Gold medal – first place	2017 Gotland	All-Around
Gold medal – first place	2017 Gotland	Vault
Gold medal – first place	2017 Gotland	Balance Beam
Gold medal – first place	2017 Gotland	Floor Exercise
Silver medal – second place	2017 Gotland	Uneven Bars
Bronze medal – third place	2013 Bermuda	Floor Exercise

Tara Megan Donnelly (born 25 December 1998) is a retired Manx artistic gymnast. She is the 2021 Northern European champion on floor exercise. She previously represented Ireland in international competition.

== Early life ==
Donnelly was born on the Isle of Man in 1998. She has a sister, Chloe, who is also a gymnast. She is a dual citizen of Ireland and Great Britain. Donnelly attended Ballakermeen High School.

== Gymnastics career ==
=== 2013 ===
Donnelly competed at the British Championships where she finished 17th in the junior all-around division. She competed at the Island Games, helping the Isle of Man finish first in the team floor and vault competition and individually won bronze on floor exercise. She next competed at the Northern European Championships where she helped the Isle of Man finish eighth as a team and individually she placed fifth on vault.

=== 2014 ===
Donnelly competed at the Welsh, English, and British championships early in the year. She was selected to represent the Isle of Man at the 2014 Commonwealth Games. While there she helped Isle of Man finish 10th as a team.

=== 2015 ===
In 2015 Donnelly began representing Ireland in international competition. She made her debut for Ireland at the European Championships. Additionally she competed at the European Games and the World Championships, representing Ireland, and at the Northern European Championships representing the Isle of Man.

=== 2017 ===
Donnelly competed at the English Championships and the Irish Championships, winning silver in the all-around at the latter. In June she competed at the Island Games where she dominated the competition. She helped Isle of Man finish first in the team floor and vault event and individually she won gold in the all-around, vault, balance beam, and floor exercise and silver on uneven bars. She competed at the Northern European Championships, representing Ireland. She helped the team finish seventh.

=== 2018 ===
Donnelly competed at the Irish Championships in early 2018. She was slated to compete at the 2018 Commonwealth Games as part of the Manx delegation; however she was unable to do so due to representing Ireland opposed to Great Britain in international competition.

=== 2021 ===
Due to the global COVID-19 pandemic and no longer representing Ireland in international competition, Donnelly did not compete again until 2021. In early 2021 her nationality change officially went through and her FIG license was officially updated to Great Britain. In November Donnelly competed at the Malta International where she placed first in the all-around and on vault, balance beam, and floor exercise. She won bronze on the uneven bars behind Ella Borg of Malta and fellow Manx gymnast Lucy Worthington. Donnelly next competed at the Northern European Championships. While there she helped Isle of Man finish sixth as a team and individually she finished first on floor exercise, fourth in the all-around, sixth on balance beam, and seventh on vault.

=== 2022 ===
In early 2022, Donnelly competed at the Scottish, English, and British Championships. Due to her results at these various championships she was chosen to represent the Isle of Man at the 2022 Commonwealth Games. While there, she qualified to the all-around final where she finished 13th.

== Competitive history ==
Year	Event	Team	AA	VT	UB	BB	FX
Junior
2013	British Championships		17				
2013	British Team Championships	11	21				
2013	Island Games	1st place, gold medalist(s)	7		5		3rd place, bronze medalist(s)
2013	Northern European Championships	8	28	5			
Senior
2014	Welsh Championships		7				
2014	English Championships (guest)		5				
2014	British Championships		20	6			
2014	Commonwealth Games	10	25				
2015
2015	European Championships		44				
2015	FIT Challenge	8	33				
2015	European Games	18	56				
2015	Northern European Championships		22				
2015	World Championships		159				
2017	English Championships (guest)		5				
2017	Irish Championships		2nd place, silver medalist(s)				
2017	Island Games	1st place, gold medalist(s)	1st place, gold medalist(s)	1st place, gold medalist(s)	2nd place, silver medalist(s)	1st place, gold medalist(s)	1st place, gold medalist(s)
2017	Northern European Championships	7					
2018	Irish Championships			4			
2021	Malta International		1st place, gold medalist(s)	1st place, gold medalist(s)	3rd place, bronze medalist(s)	1st place, gold medalist(s)	1st place, gold medalist(s)
2021	Northern European Championships	6	4	7		6	1st place, gold medalist(s)
2022	Scottish Championships (guest)		1st place, gold medalist(s)				
2022	English Championships (guest)						1st place, gold medalist(s)
2022	British Championships		23	7			
2022	Commonwealth Games		13				

== See also ==
- Nationality changes in gymnastics
