= Emil Soravuo =

Finnish artistic gymnast

- Born: 28 March 1997 (age 29) Espoo, Finland

Gymnastics career
- Discipline: Men's artistic gymnastics
- Country represented: Finland
- Club: Espoon Telinetaiturit
- Head coaches: Mati Kirmes; Dmytro Gorbachov
Medal record
World Championships
Bronze medal – third place	2021 Kitakyushu	Floor Exercise
European Games
Gold medal – first place	2019 Minsk	Floor Exercise
Northern European Championships
Gold medal – first place	2015 Limerick	Vault
Silver medal – second place	2016 Trondheim	Vault
Bronze medal – third place	2015 Limerick	Team

Emil Soravuo (born 28 March 1997) is a Finnish artistic gymnast and the 2021 bronze medalist in floor exercise. In 2019, he won the gold medal in the men's floor exercise event at the 2019 European Games held in Minsk, Belarus.

In 2014, he represented Finland at the 2014 Summer Youth Olympics held in Nanjing, China without winning a medal.

In March 2017, he completed his military service at the Armed Forces Military School, where he trained in gymnastics in the evenings. "I actually did really well in the army. I got to keep myself fit there."

In 2019, he competed in the men's floor event at the 2019 European Artistic Gymnastics Championships without winning a medal.

In 2021, he competed in the men's floor event at the 2021 World Artistic Gymnastics Championships and won the bronze medal.
