= Gymnastics at the 2013 Island Games =

Artistic gymnastics, for the 2013 Island Games, took place at the National Training Centre, instead of the Warwick Academy. Competition occurred on the 14, 16, and 18 July 2013.

== Medal table ==
- 2013 Island Games Gymnastics Medal Tally

* Host nation (Bermuda)

Rank	Nation	Gold	Silver	Bronze	Total
1	Isle of Man	18	14	15	47
2	Faroe Islands	4	6	5	15
3	Bermuda*	2	1	2	5
4	Jersey	1	2	3	6
5	Cayman Islands	0	1	0	1
Totals (5 entries)		25	24	25	74

== Medal summary ==
=== Men's FIG events ===
Event	Gold		Silver		Bronze	
Team floor & vault	Faroe Islands	76.050	Isle of Man	75.000	Not awarded	
Individual overall	Antony Duchars (IOM)	73.850	Anand Patel (IOM)	73.450	Harshul Measuria (IOM)	73.050
Floor	Anand Patel (IOM)	13.700	Øssur Debes Eiriksfoss (FRO)	13.550	Mukunda Measuria (IOM)	13.400
Vault	Øssur Debes Eiriksfoss (FRO)	14.100	Anand Patel (IOM)	12.925	Bogi Berg (FRO)	12.625
High bar	Mukunda Measuria (IOM)	12.850	Harshul Measuria (IOM)	12.150	Antony Duchars (IOM)	11.700
Parallel bars	Harshul Measuria (IOM)	12.900	Øssur Debes Eiriksfoss (FRO)	12.550	Antony Duchars (IOM)	12.500
Rings	Valerijs Savins (FRO)	13.200	Øssur Debes Eiriksfoss (FRO)	12.000	Bogi Berg (FRO); Mukunda Measuria (IOM)	11.600
Pommel horse	Antony Duchars (IOM)	12.300	Harshul Measuria (IOM)	11.800	Anand Patel (IOM)	11.600

=== Men's SET events ===
Event	Gold		Silver		Bronze	
Floor	Anand Patel (IOM)	9.150	Harshul Measuria (IOM)	8.950	Brandon Garrett (IOM)	8.900
Vault	Øssur Debes Eiriksfoss (FRO)	9.800	Bogi Berg (FRO)	9.700	Aron Jacobsen (FRO)	9.600
High bar	Antony Duchars (IOM)	9.500	Jóni Brandsson Christiansen (FRO)	9.200	Nicholas Harvey (IOM)	9.150
Parallel bars	Antony Duchars (IOM); Harshul Measuria (IOM)	9.500	Not awarded		Aron Jacobsen (FRO)	9.400
Rings	Mukunda Measuria (IOM)	9.700	Øssur Debes Eiriksfoss (FRO)	9.600	Brandon Garrett (IOM)	9.500
Pommel horse	Antony Duchars (IOM)	9.400	Harshul Measuria (IOM)	9.200	Anand Patel (IOM)	9.150

=== Women's FIG events ===
Event	Gold		Silver		Bronze	
Team floor & vault	Isle of Man	101.500	Bermuda	98.650	Faroe Islands	93.450
Individual overall	Grace Harrison (IOM)	48.750	Bonita Mia Shurmer (JEY)	45.400	Nicole Burns (IOM)	44.950
Floor	Grace Harrison (IOM)	13.150	Emily Dale-Beeton (IOM)	11.750	Tara Donnelly (IOM)	11.500
Vault	Grace Harrison (IOM)	13.125	Emily Dale-Beeton (IOM)	13.100	Aoife Donnelly (IOM); Bonita Mia Shurmer (JEY)	12.975
Asymmetric (uneven) bars	Bonita Mia Shurmer (Jersey)	10.650	Grace Harrison (IOM); Charlotte May Pollard (JEY)	10.150	Not awarded	
Beam	Grace Harrison (IOM)	12.450	Rebecca Johnson (IOM)	11.700	Tabytha Hofheins (BER)	11.650

=== Women's SET events ===
Event	Gold		Silver		Bronze	
Floor	Rebecca Johnson (IOM)	12.300	Grace Harrison (IOM)	12.250	Bonita Mia Shurmer (JEY)	12.200
Vault	Nicole Burns (IOM)	12.400	Bethany Dikau (CAY)	12.350	Grace Harrison (IOM)	12.250
Asymmetric (uneven) bars	Sadia Wilson (BER)	12.800	Grace Harrison (IOM)	12.650	Gabrielle Vincent (BER); Tara Donnelly (IOM)	12.550
Beam	Sadia Wilson (BER)	12.850	Grace Harrison (IOM)	12.800	Charlotte May Pollard (JEY)	12.550
