= Demetrios Bradshaw =

Aviation industry executive

- Education: Kingston University (BSc, 2006)
- Occupations: Aviation executive; Business executive
- Employer: Aeras Aviation
- Known for: CEO of Aeras Aviation
- Title: Chief Executive Officer
- Board member of: Air Botswana

Special Advisor for National and International Aviation
- Appointed by: Duma Boko

Demetrios Bradshaw is an aviation industry executive who is chief executive officer of Aeras Aviation and sits on the board of Air Botswana. He has been appointed Special Advisor to the President of Botswana, Duma Boko, for National and International Aviation. He is a Member of the Royal Aeronautical Society (MRAeS) and a former Olympics coach.

== Education ==
Bradshaw studied at Kingston University, graduating in 2006 with a Bachelor of Science with Honours in Business Information Technology.

== Career ==
Aeras Aviation was founded in October 2017 in Dubai with a focus on aviation asset management and aftermarket solutions. The company specialises in end-of-life engine acquisitions, strategic teardowns, and the supply of used serviceable material across major engine platforms, including those manufactured by CFM International, GE Aerospace, Rolls-Royce, Pratt & Whitney, and International Aero Engines.

Under Bradshaw's tenure, Aeras Aviation expanded its operational footprint, including increased investment in logistics and storage infrastructure in Dubai and expansion into the United States market.

Aviation Week Network reported in 2025 that Aeras Aviation was expanding its engine teardown portfolio beyond its historical focus on the CFM56-5B and -7B variants to include the CFM56-5C, which powers the Airbus A340, as well as the IAE V2500 and Pratt & Whitney PW4000.

Bradshaw has been quoted in aviation and business media on topics including supply-chain resilience and sustainability in the aviation aftermarket sector, including asset reuse and lifecycle management of aircraft engines and components.

=== Olympics coaching ===
Bradshaw was a coach to Irish artistic gymnast Kieran Behan during the London 2012 Olympic qualification period. At the time, Behan received a €20,000 grant from the Irish Sports Council and the Olympic Council of Ireland to support training and travel costs.
