= Kieran Behan =

Irish artistic gymnast

- Born: 19 April 1989 (age 37) Croydon, England

Gymnastics career
- Discipline: Men's artistic gymnastics
- Country represented: (Republic of Ireland) Ireland (2009–)
- Former countries represented: (United Kingdom) Great Britain
- Club: Tolworth Gymnastics Club
- Head coaches: Simon Gale; Demetrios Bradshaw
Medal record
Representing Ireland
Northern European Championships
Gold medal – first place	2014 Greve	High Bar
Gold medal – first place	2015 Limerick	Floor
Gold medal – first place	2015 Limerick	Team All-around
Silver medal – second place	2015 Limerick	Rings
Silver medal – second place	2015 Limerick	All-around
Silver medal – second place	2014 Greve	Rings
Bronze medal – third place	2014 Greve	Team All-around

Kieran Behan OLY (born 19 April 1989) is an Irish artistic gymnast who represents Ireland internationally. He is the first ever Irish gymnast to qualify for the Olympic Games, competing at both London 2012 and Rio 2016 (the first Irish Olympic gymnast, Barry McDonald, was awarded an invitational place in 1996).

== Early life ==
Behan was born in Hertfordshire, London to Irish parents Phil and Bernie. At the age of 10, a benign tumour was found in Behan's leg and complications from the surgical operation to remove the tumour left him reliant on a wheelchair for approximately a year. 15 months later, defying expectations, he returned to his gymnastics training. Not long after his return, he slipped on the high bar during a training session and sustained a head injury which resulted in a brain injury and damage to his inner ear affecting his balance and co-ordination skills. He was once again reliant on a wheelchair, and had to relearn simple skills to sit up and move his head. The injuries left him unable to train for 3 years, and doctors told him they did not expect him to be able to walk again, much less be able to do gymnastics.

Despite these setbacks, Behan returned to gymnastics and gained several awards as a Junior gymnast. including a 4th-place finish at the Junior European Championships in Volos, Greece in 2006 competing for GBR. In the few years that followed, Behan struggled with continuous minor injuries as he transitioned into the senior ranks.

== Gymnastics career ==
In 2009, Behan underwent Anterior cruciate ligament reconstructive surgery on his right knee. This procedure had a 9 to 12-month recovery time. Six weeks before he was due to make his senior debut in the 2010 European Championships, he then ruptured the ACL in his other knee. In October 2010, he finally made his senior debut on the International scene, competing in the 2010 World Artistic Gymnastics Championships. He was able to compete in the qualifying rounds of the 2010 World Championships in Rotterdam, participating in three out of the six events without dismounts due to still recovering from the left knee ACL surgery.

2011 became a breakout year for Behan as he competed at the European Championships in Berlin and the World Challenge Cup series, where he became the overall World Cup Champion on the Floor Exercise, winning gold, silver, and bronze medals. He went on to compete in the 2011 World Championships in Tokyo. Qualifying himself to the final stage of the London 2012 Olympic games process (the London Prepares Olympic test event) Behan did not receive funding from the Irish Sports Council or Gymnastics Ireland, by the end of 2011 he had spent close to €12,000 on travel and accommodation expenses to get to the international competitions, friends and family supporting him by raising money through bake sales and other fundraisers.

In 2012, he competed in the London Prepares Olympic Test Event, where he qualified for the Floor Exercise final, finishing in fourth place behind Gold medallists Daniel Purvis and Tomás González and Bronze medallist Kristian Thomas, gaining the best execution score of the final. His performance in the London Prepares preliminary competition qualified him to the 2012 Summer Olympics. As a result, he was able to get a grant of €12,000 from the Irish Sports Council. His story, and the fact he is only the second Irish gymnast to compete at the Olympics made him a star overnight, being in demand for media interviews, and appearing on RTÉ's The Late Late Show.

He competed with a full Irish team at the 2012 European Championships, becoming the first Irish Gymnast to qualify for a European final (ranking third going into the floor final). In 2012, Kieran also gained BT Ireland as a sponsor.

One month prior to the London Olympic Games, Behan broke the metatarsal in his foot; despite this injury, he competed at the London Olympics. He did not qualify for the individual all-around or any of the event finals.

In the months that followed the London 2012 Olympics, Behan underwent further knee surgery on his Left knee. Due to the tumour surgery as a child, Behan had part of his left quadriceps muscle removed, meaning that this leg would always be impaired. The 2010 ACL surgery on that leg later caused more instability, and in 2013 he underwent another possible career-ending microfracture surgery. After a long rehab process, he again defied the odds and returned to compete in the 2014 Artistic World Championships in China.

2015 saw Behan have a steady competitive season for the first time in his career, seeing him compete in the 2015 European Olympic Games, becoming the first Irish Gymnast to qualify to a European All Around Final and into his second European floor final, finishing just outside the medals in 4th place. Later in 2015, Behan competed in the Glasgow World Championships, qualifying to the final stage for the 2016 Rio Olympic Games.

In April 2016, Behan took part in the Aquece Rio Final Gymnastics Qualifier and qualified to compete in the 2016 Summer Olympics winning a silver medal on the floor exercise, becoming the only Irish gymnast to qualify for two Olympic Games. At the 2016 Olympics, he did not reach the final for any of his events. He continued on in his floor routine, despite dislocating his knee on his first tumbling line. Ultimately, this would be the last competition Behan would compete in due to the left knee dislocation. After returning home from his second Olympic Games, Behan underwent another left knee surgery, where he received the devastating news that he would have to retire from Gymnastics as he needed a total knee replacement. Behan has taken all of his knowledge and experiences and transitioned into coaching and is currently the Head Junior National Coach of Austria.
