= Gymnastics at the 2019 European Games – Men's floor exercise =

Men's floor exercise at the 2019 European Games
- Venue: Minsk-Arena
- Date: 30 June
- Competitors: 6 from 6 nations
- Winning score: 14.433

Medalists
gold medal	Emil Soravuo	Finland
silver medal	Giarnni Regini-Moran	Great Britain
bronze medal	Petro Pakhnyuk	Ukraine

The men's artistic gymnastics floor exercise competition at the 2019 European Games was held at the Minsk-Arena on 30 June 2019.

== Qualification ==
The top six gymnasts with one per country advanced to the final.

Rank	Gymnast	D Score	E Score	Pen.	Total	Qual.
1	Emil Soravuo (FIN)	5.600	9.200		14.600	Q
2	Yahor Sharamkou (BLR)	5.900	8.566		14.466	Q
3	Petro Pakhnyuk (UKR)	5.700	8.733		14.433	Q
4	Oskar Kirmes (FIN)	5.500	8.866		14.366	
5	Dmitriy Lankin (RUS)	6.200	8.266	–0.100	14.366	Q
6	David Belyavskiy (RUS)	5.800	8.566	–0.100	14.266	
7	Giarnni Regini-Moran (GBR)	6.200	8.033		14.233	Q
8	Artur Davtyan (ARM)	5.200	9.000		14.200	Q
9	Robert Tvorogal (LTU)	5.400	8.800		14.200	R1
10	Néstor Abad (ESP)	5.600	8.600		14.200	R2
11	Joel Plata (ESP)	5.600	8.566		14.166	
12	Marco Pfyl (SUI)	5.300	8.733		14.033	R3

== Final ==
Rank	Gymnast	D Score	E Score	Pen.	Total
1st place, gold medalist(s)	Emil Soravuo (FIN)	5.600	8.833		14.433
2nd place, silver medalist(s)	Giarnni Regini-Moran (GBR)	5.900	8.333		14.433
3rd place, bronze medalist(s)	Petro Pakhnyuk (UKR)	5.700	8.500		14.200
4	Dmitriy Lankin (RUS)	6.500	8.233	–0.600	14.133
5	Yahor Sharamkou (BLR)	6.000	7.833	–0.300	13.533
6	Artur Davtyan (ARM)	5.200	8.366	–0.100	13.466
