= Brinn Bevan =

Welsh artistic gymnast

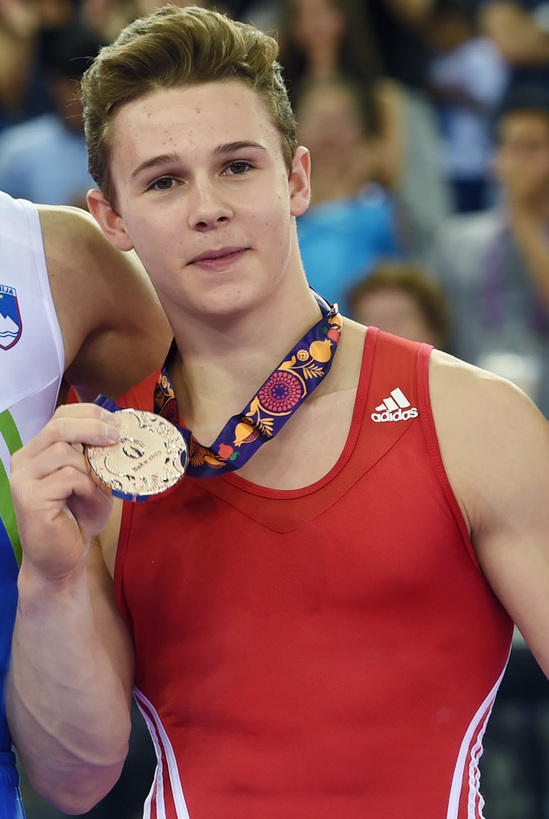
- Bevan at the 2015 European Games

Personal information
- Born: 16 June 1997 (age 29) Southend-on-Sea, England

Gymnastics career
- Discipline: Men's artistic gymnastics
- Country represented: (United Kingdom) Great Britain; Wales; (2015 -)
- Club: South Essex Gymnastics Club
- Head coach: Scott Hann
Medal record
Representing Great Britain
World Championships
Silver medal – second place	2015 Glasgow	Team
European Games
Bronze medal – third place	2015 Baku	Pommel horse
Representing Wales
Northern European Championships
Gold medal – first place	2019 Kópavogur	Pommel Horse
Gold medal – first place	2021 Cardiff	Team
Gold medal – first place	2021 Cardiff	Parallel Bars
Silver medal – second place	2019 Kópavogur	Team

Brinn John Bevan (born 16 June 1997) is a Welsh artistic gymnast. He was part of the first men's team from Great Britain to win a team medal at a World Gymnastics Championships in Glasgow on 28 October 2015. He was part of the British team to compete in the 2016 Rio de Janeiro Olympics.

== Gymnastics career ==
=== As a junior ===
In 2012, Bevan was part of the gold-winning team at the European Gymnastics Championships in Montpellier.

In 2014, he was again chosen for the junior team at the European Gymnastics Championships in Sofia, Bulgaria, where, besides helping to secure another gold for the British team, he won individual silver medals on parallel bars and still rings, and bronze in the all-around behind his teammate Nile Wilson, who won gold, and Valentin Starikov of Russia.

=== As a senior ===
In 2015, Bevan made his senior debut for the international squad competing at the European Games in Baku, where he won a bronze medal on the pommel horse.

Later that year, he was chosen to compete at the 2015 World Artistic Gymnastics Championships in Glasgow, Scotland, where he helped the team qualify for the 2016 Olympic Games. The team went on to win silver in the team finals, which was Britain's first team medal for the men (the women's team had made history by winning Britain's first ever team medal when they secured the bronze the previous evening). On 21 November Bevan was training on vault and after an odd landing he broke his fibula and tibia on his left leg and had to undergo surgery and months of physical therapy.

On 12 July 2016, he was selected for the 2016 British Olympic team along with Louis Smith, Nile Wilson, Kristian Thomas and Max Whitlock.

In March 2018, Bevan won the all-around title at the British Championships for the first time.

In late September 2019, Bevan competed at the Northern European Championships in Kópavogur, Iceland, where he won a gold medal on the pommel horse and a silver medal in the team event.
