= Gymnastics at the 2017 Island Games =

- Dates: June 24 – 30
- Host city: Gotland, Sweden
- Venue: Sävehallen, Visby
- Level: Senior

Gymnastics, for the 2017 Island Games, held at the Sävehallen, Visby, Gotland, Sweden in June 2017.

== General ==
The last time gymnastics was an event in the Island Games was in 2013, an event that was dominated by the Isle of Man who took 17 of the 25 gold medals.

Bermuda has named a team of five, aged between 13 and 15. 2017 will be the first time Gotland has put forward a team to compete in a gymnastics event.

== Medal table ==
| Rank | Nation | Gold | Silver | Bronze | Total |
|---|---|---|---|---|---|
| 1 | Isle of Man | 13 | 9 | 7 | 29 |
| 2 | Jersey | 11 | 1 | 4 | 16 |
| 3 | Faroe Islands | 4 | 9 | 6 | 19 |
| 4 | Bermuda | 1 | 5 | 4 | 10 |
| 5 | (Anglesey) Ynys Môn | 0 | 1 | 0 | 1 |
| 6 | Åland | 0 | 0 | 1 | 1 |
| Totals (6 entries) | | 29 | 25 | 22 | 76 |

== Results ==
=== Men's FIG events ===
| Event | Gold | | Silver | | Bronze | |
|---|---|---|---|---|---|---|
| Team floor & vault | Faroe Islands; Hjálmar Allansson Dalsgarð; Bogi Berg; Rani Allansson Dalsgarð; Aron Jacobsen; Christopher Klevang; Djóni Sakarisson | 56.350 | Jersey; Zee Adamson; Cameron Aird; Alexander Buesnel; Anushan Elanco; James Evans; Andre Stephen Romeril | 55.850 | Isle of Man; Nicholas Harvey; Callum Kewley; Harshul Measuria; Mukunda Measuria | 55.650 |
| Individual overall | Daniel Lee (JER) | 77.500 | Aron Jacobsen (FRO) | 70.650 | Nicholas Harvey (IOM) | 70.150 |
| Floor | Daniel Lee (JER) | 13.500 | Bogi Berg (FRO) | 12.600 | Aron Jacobsen (FRO) | 12.500 |
| Pommel horse | Daniel Lee (JER) | 12.000 | Aron Jacobsen (FRO) | 10.100 | Nicholas Harvey (IOM) | 8.900 |
| Rings | Daniel Lee (JER) | 12.900 | Djóni Sakarisson (FRO) | 12.100 | Mukunda Measuria (IOM) | 11.900 |
| Vault | Bogi Berg (FRO); Nicholas Harvey (IOM) | 12.950 | none awarded | | Christoper Klevang (FRO); Daniel Lee (JER) | 12.800 |
| Parallel bars | Daniel Lee (JER) | 13.600 | Aron Jacobsen (FRO) | 12.600 | Callum Kewley (IOM) | 12.500 |
| Horizontal bar | Daniel Lee (JER) | 11.400 | Hjálmar Allansson Dalsgarð (FAR) | 11.200 | Nicholas Harvey (IOM) | 11.200 |

=== Men's SET events ===
| Event | Gold | | Silver | | Bronze | |
|---|---|---|---|---|---|---|
| Floor | Cameron Aird (JER) | 9.200 | Daniel Anthony Chadwick-Jones (Ynys Môn) | 13.550 | Aron Jacobsen (FAR); Andre Stephen Romeril (JER) | 9.050 |
| Pommel horse | Glenn Yates (IOM) | 9.100 | Aron Jacobsen (FAR) | 9.050 | Mukunda Measuria (IOM) | 8.700 |
| Rings | Cameron Aird (JER) | 9.350 | Djóni Sakarisson (FRO); Mukunda Measuria (IOM) | 9.300 | mone awarded | |
| Vault | Djóni Sakarisson (FRO); Callum Kewley (IOM); Zee Adamson (JER) | 10.000 | none awarded | | none awarded | |
| Parallel bars | Aron Jacobsen (FAR); Nicholas Harvey (IOM); Andre Stephen Romeril (JER) | 9.800 | none awarded | | none awarded | |
| Horizontal bar | Nicholas Harvey (IOM) | 9.400 | Aron Jacobsen (FAR) | 9.250 | Hjálmar Allansson Dalsgarð (FAR) | 9.200 |

=== Women's FIG events ===
| Event | Gold | | Silver | | Bronze | |
|---|---|---|---|---|---|---|
| Team floor & vault | Isle of Man; Nicole Burns; Chloe Donnelly; Tara Donnelly; Madison Nicol; Emma Sutton; Lucy Worthington | 72.150 | Bermuda; Anna Michelle Francoeur; Gianna Shannen Webbe; Chantae Wilson | 69.950 | Faroe Islands; Christina Turiðardóttir Arge; Lív Árting; Elsbet Lamhauge Dalbø; Marta Nielsen; Marý Petersen; Rebekka Ingadóttir Rein | 68.600 |
| Individual overall | Tara Donnelly (IOM) | 49.950 | Nicole Burns (IOM) | 47.700 | Anna Michelle Francoeur (BER) | 46.700 |
| Vault | Tara Donnelly (IOM) | 12.750 | Chloe Donnelly (IOM) | 12.575 | Elsa Häger (Åland); Marý Petersen (FAR) | 12.200 |
| Uneven bars | Chantae Wilson (BER) | 11.300 | Tara Donnelly (IOM) | 11.100 | Anna Michelle Francoeur (BER) | 10.200 |
| Balance beam | Tara Donnelly (IOM) | 13.050 | Chantae Wilson (BER) | 12.550 | Anna Michelle Francoeur (BER) | 12.150 |
| Floor | Tara Donnelly (IOM) | 11.500 | Chloe Donnelly (IOM) | 11.150 | Elisha Stott (JER) | 10.850 |

=== Women's SET events ===
| Event | Gold | | Silver | | Bronze | |
|---|---|---|---|---|---|---|
| Vault | Tara Donnelly (IOM) | 11.675 | Anna Michelle Francoeur (BER); Gianna Shannen Webbe (BER); Emma Sutton (IOM) | 11.525 | none awarded | |
| Uneven bars | Bonita Shurmer (JER) | 12.700 | Nicole Burns (IOM) | 12.650 | Lucy Worthington (IOM) | 12.600 |
| Balance beam | Tara Donnelly (IOM) | 12.950 | Chantae Wilson (BER) | 12.800 | Elisha Stott (JER) | 12.750 |
| Floor | Tara Donnelly (IOM) | 12.600 | Nicole Burns (IOM) | 12.550 | Chantae Wilson (BER) | 12.400 |
