= Emily Thomas (gymnast) =

Welsh artistic gymnast (born 2001)

- Born: 25 February 2001 (age 25) Bridgend, Wales
- Height: 152 cm (5 ft 0 in)

Gymnastics career
- Discipline: Women's artistic gymnastics
- Country represented: Great Britain; Wales
- Head coach: Tracey Skirton
- Retired: 17 September 2021
Medal record
Representing Great Britain
FIG World Cup
Event / 1st / 2nd / 3rd; World Challenge Cup / 0 / 1 / 0
Representing Wales
Northern European Championships
Gold medal – first place	2014 Greve	Team
Gold medal – first place	2016 Trondheim	Uneven bars
Gold medal – first place	2019 Kópavogur	Team
Gold medal – first place	2019 Kópavogur	All-around
Gold medal – first place	2019 Kópavogur	Uneven bars
Gold medal – first place	2019 Kópavogur	Floor exercise
Bronze medal – third place	2016 Trondheim	Team

Emily Thomas (born 25 February 2001) is a Welsh artistic gymnast. She represented Wales at the 2018 Commonwealth Games and won four gold medals at the 2019 Northern European Championships. While representing Great Britain, she won a silver medal on the floor exercise at the 2019 Szombathely World Challenge Cup and was the team alternate for the 2018 World Championships.

== Gymnastics career ==
=== Junior ===
Thomas won a gold medal with the Welsh team at the 2014 Northern European Championships. She won the all-around title at the 2016 Junior Commonwealth Championships and also helped Wales win the team competition. She won a third gold medal on the uneven bars. Then at the 2016 Northern European Championships, she won a gold medal on the uneven bars and a bronze medal with the Welsh team.

=== Senior ===
Thomas won the all-around title at the 2017 Welsh Championships. She was selected to represent Wales at the 2018 Commonwealth Games alongside Latalia Bevan, Holly Jones, Maisie Methuen, and Jolie Ruckley. They finished fourth in the team competition. Thomas qualified for the floor exercise final and finished sixth. She represented Great Britain at the 2018 Guimaraes World Challenge Cup and finished eighth on the vault, sixth on the balance beam, and fourth on the floor exercise. She was the alternate for the British team that competed at the 2018 World Championships.

Thomas won the all-around title at the 2019 Welsh Championships. At the 2019 Szombathely World Challenge Cup, she won a silver medal on the floor exercise behind Spain's Marina González. She then won the all-around title at the 2019 Northern European Championships and helped Wales win the team event. She also won gold medals on the uneven bars and floor exercise. She injured her knee in September 2019 and then missed several additional months of training due to the COVID-19 pandemic.

Thomas competed at the series of British Olympic Trials, but she was not selected for the team. She announced her retirement from gymnastics on 17 September 2021, with plans to start a psychology degree course at the Cardiff Metropolitan University.
