= 2025 Northern European Gymnastics Championships =

International gymnastics competition

- Venue: Herewoode Academy
- Location: Leicester, England
- Start date: 24 October 2025
- End date: 26 October 2025

The 2025 Northern European Gymnastics Championships was an artistic gymnastics event held in Leicester, England. The event took place between 24 and 26 October 2025.

== Medalists ==
Event	Gold	Silver	Bronze
Men
Team all-around	Wales; Joe Cemlyn-Jones; Jacob Edwards; Henry Lewis; Alex Niscoveanu; Theo Amari Ochana; Elliot Vernon	England; Zion Aserie; Ryan Cirino; Samuel Ghinn; Thomas Jones; Charlie Harvey Lloyd; Oliver Porter	Scotland; Andrew Dickie; Moray Gault; Caiden-Jay Malone; Euan McLellan; Kyle Miller; Daniel Smyllie
Individual all-around	(Wales) Joe Cemlyn-Jones	(Wales) Elliot Vernon	(Wales) Jacob Edwards
Floor	(Wales) Jacob Edwards	(Wales) Joe Cemlyn-Jones	(Scotland) Kyle Miller
Pommel horse	(England) Samuel Ghinn (Finland) Pavel Titov	Not awarded	(Scotland) Euan McLellan
Rings	(Wales) Joe Cemlyn-Jones	(Finland) Leevi Makkonen	(Wales) Elliot Vernon
Vault	(Wales) Henry Lewis	(Finland) Leevi Makkonen	(England) Thomas Jones
Parallel bars	(England) Samuel Ghinn	(Wales) Jacob Edwards	(England) Oliver Porter
Horizontal bar	(Wales) Elliot Vernon	(England) Samuel Ghinn	(Scotland) Moray Gault
Women
Team all-around	England; Emily Burke; Olivia Cham; Mabelle Dawson; Corinna Gooderham; Georgia Stables; Tahlia Wyatt	Finland; Minea Antila; Misella Antila; Saara Kokko; Sirkku Korpela; Sara Laiho; Adeliina Siikala	Norway; Olivia Bergem; Amalie Dalene; Nora Jordhøy; Serina Kvaestad; Siril Larsen; Anna Vik
Individual all-around	(England) Emily Burke	(England) Tahlia Wyatt	(Iceland) Rakel Pétursdóttir (Scotland) Lottie Smith
Vault	(Finland) Adeliina Siikala	(Scotland) Isla Carse	(Norway) Amalie Dalene
Uneven bars	(Finland) Sirkku Korpela	(England) Georgia Stables	(Norway) Amalie Dalene
Balance beam	(Northern Ireland) Niamh McConnell	(Norway) Olivia Bergem	(England) Corinna Gooderham
Floor	(Norway) Nora Jordhøy	(Iceland) Rakel Pétursdóttir	(England) Tahlia Wyatt

== Medal table ==
Rank	Nation	Gold	Silver	Bronze	Total
1	Wales (WAL)	6	3	2	11
2	England (ENG)	4	4	4	12
3	Finland (FIN)	3	3	0	6
4	Norway (NOR)	1	1	3	5
5	Northern Ireland (NIR)	1	0	0	1
6	Scotland (SCO)	0	1	5	6
7	Iceland (ISL)	0	1	1	2
Totals (7 entries)		15	13	15	43
