= Sofus Heggemsnes =

Norwegian artistic gymnast

- Born: 13 July 1999 (age 27) Oslo, Norway

Gymnastics career
- Discipline: Men's artistic gymnastics
- Country represented: Norway
- Club: Oslo Turnforening
- Head coaches: Valentyn Skrypin, Vitalij Solodkijs
Medal record
Artistic gymnastics
Representing Norway
Event / 1st / 2nd / 3rd; FIG World Cup / 0 / 0 / 1
Northern European Championships
Gold medal – first place	2016 Trondheim	Team
Gold medal – first place	2019 Kópavogur	Team
Gold medal – first place	2019 Kópavogur	All-Around
Gold medal – first place	2019 Kópavogur	Floor Exercise
Silver medal – second place	2016 Trondheim	All-Around
Silver medal – second place	2016 Trondheim	Pommel Horse
Silver medal – second place	2019 Kópavogur	Rings
Silver medal – second place	2019 Kópavogur	Parallel Bars
Silver medal – second place	2019 Kópavogur	Horizontal Bar
Bronze medal – third place	2016 Trondheim	Parallel Bars
Bronze medal – third place	2019 Kópavogur	Pommel Horse

Sofus Heggemsnes (born 13 July 1999) is a Norwegian artistic gymnast who competed at the 2017, 2018, and 2019 World Championships. He represented Norway at the 2020 Summer Olympics in Tokyo, Japan. He is a four-time Northern European champion, as well as a World Cup bronze medalist.

== Early life ==
Heggemsnes was born in Oslo, Norway to a Swedish father of Jamaican and Trinidadian descent, and a Norwegian mother who was born in California. He has a twin brother, as well as two older brothers and two older sisters.

Heggemsnes first took up football as a child, and used to celebrate goals by doing cartwheels. A parent of another player suggested to his mother that she should enroll him in gymnastics. He started training in gymnastics at age nine.

== Gymnastics career ==
Heggemsnes has been training with his current coach Valentyn Skrypin since age 11. He made his international debut at the 2016 Junior European Championships in Bern, Switzerland, placing 42nd in the all-around during qualifications. Later that year, he competed at the 2016 Northern European Championships in Trondheim, where he was part of the gold medal-winning Norwegian team. Individually, he took the silver medal in the all-around and on the pommel horse, and the bronze on the parallel bars.

Heggemsnes became a senior in 2017, making his international senior debut at the Varna World Cup in Bulgaria, placing seventh in the pommel horse final. He went on to compete at his first World Championships in Montreal, Canada, but did not make any finals. In 2018, he competed at the European Championships in Glasgow, and the World Championships in Doha, where he placed 40th all-around in qualifications, and 22nd with the Norwegian team. He also finished seventh on pommel horse at the 2018 Guimarães World Cup.

In 2019, Heggemsnes became the senior Norwegian all-around national champion and won a bronze medal on vault at the Szombathely World Cup in Hungary. He also had success at the 2019 Northern European Championships in Kópavogur, winning the all-around title with a score of 80.950, and helping Norway take the team gold ahead of Wales and Scotland. He also won gold on floor, silver on rings, parallel bars and horizontal bar, as well as a bronze on pommel horse. Heggemsnes went on to compete at the 2019 World Championships in Stuttgart where he placed 51st all-around in qualifications, scoring 79.623. His performance at the World Championships earned him an individual spot at the 2020 Summer Olympics in Tokyo.

At the Tokyo Olympics, Heggemsnes competed on pommel horse, rings, parallel bars and the horizontal bar but did not reach the finals.
