= Cristian Bățagă =

Romanian gymnast (born 1988)

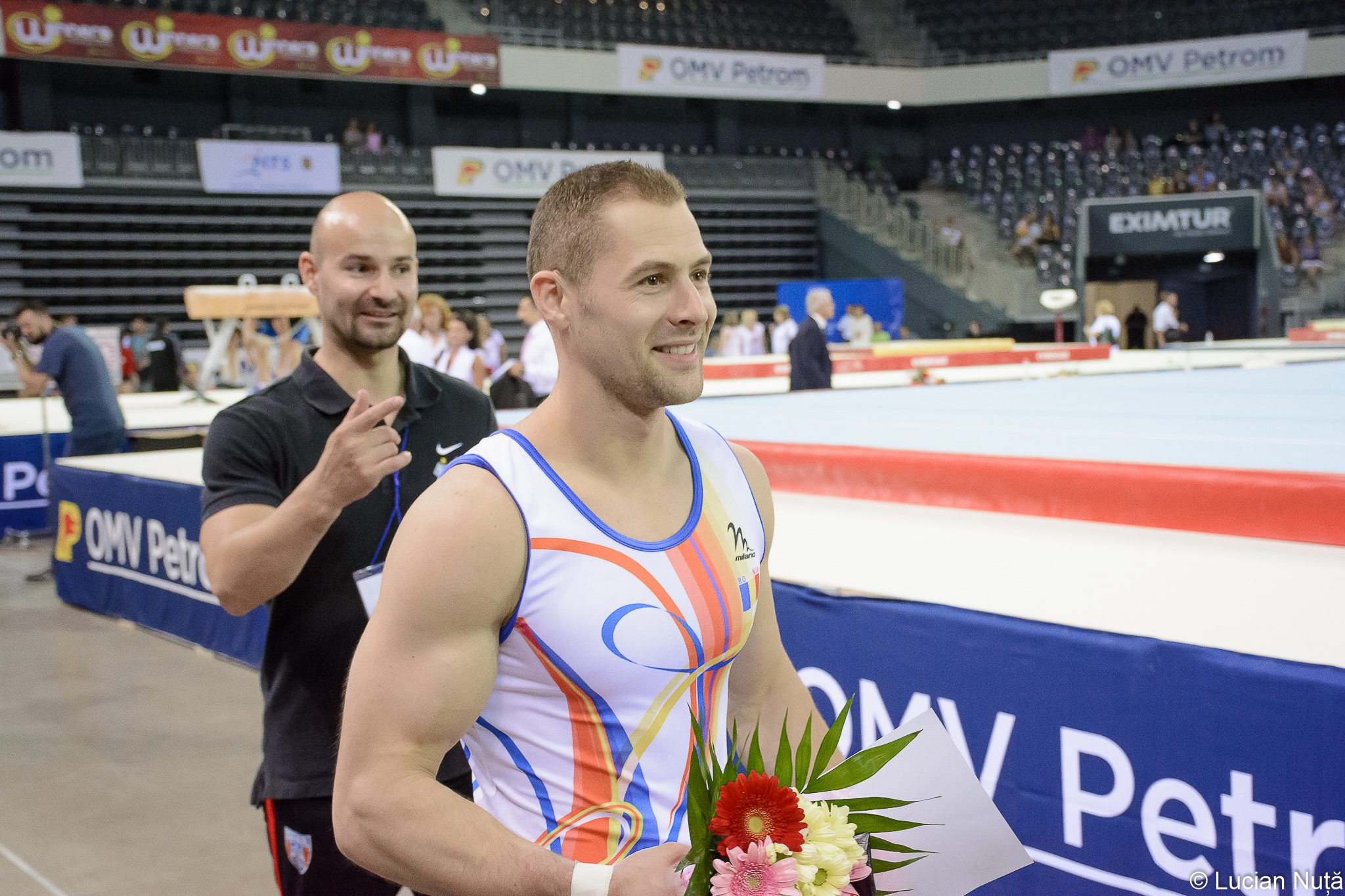
- Full name: Cristian Ioan Bățagă
- Born: 10 April 1988 (age 38) Târgu Mureș, Socialist Republic of Romania
- Height: 1.71 m (5 ft 7 in)

Gymnastics career
- Discipline: Men's artistic gymnastics
- Country represented: Romania
- Club: Clubul Sportiv Municipal Bistrița

Cristian Ioan Bățagă (born 10 April 1988) is a Romanian gymnast. He competed at the 2012 Summer Olympics.
