= Vlad Cotuna =

Romanian gymnast

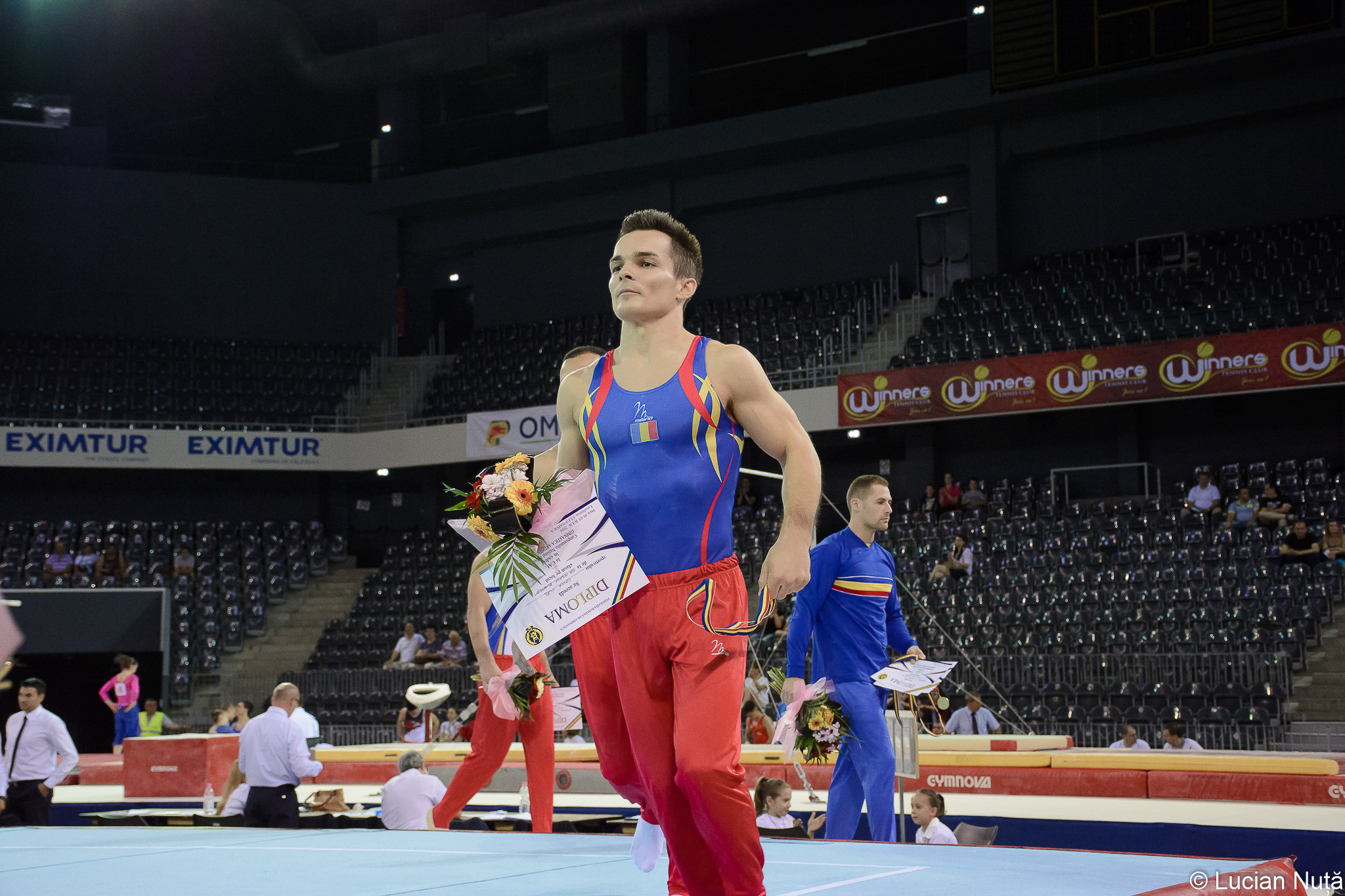
- Full name: Vlad Bogdan Cotuna
- Born: 4 November 1990 (age 35) Timișoara, Romania
- Height: 1.63 m (5 ft 4 in)

Gymnastics career
- Discipline: Men's artistic gymnastics
- Country represented: Romania
- Club: SCM Lugoj

Vlad Bogdan Cotuna (born 4 November 1990) is a Romanian gymnast. He competed at the 2012 Summer Olympics.
