= Pietro Giachino =

Norwegian artistic gymnast

- Full name: Pietro Oliver Giachino
- Born: 26 February 1995 (age 31) Oslo
- Height: 1.70 m (5 ft 7 in)

Gymnastics career
- Country represented: Norway
- Club: SK Njård
Medal record
Representing Norway
Norwegian Artistic Gymnastics Championships
Gold medal – first place	2012 Oslo	All-Around (juniors)
Silver medal – second place	2014 Stord	All-Around (seniors)

Pietro Oliver Giachino (born February 26, 1995) is a Norwegian gymnast of Italian descent.

== Career ==
Pietro Oliver Giachino was born in Oslo to a Norwegian mother and an Italian father and, since 2006, he has competed in artistic gymnastics. In 2007, he joined the Norwegian national team. As a member of the club, Pietro has won medals as both a junior and a senior competitor.

In early 2015, he began competing for the Italian artistic gymnastics club, Juventus, and participated in three sporting events. He took part in the first European Games in June 2015 where he did not win any medals. Pietro also participated in the 2014 World Artistic Gymnastics Championships and the 2015 Championships in Glasgow.

== Trivia ==
Pietro was inspired by the gymnast Åge Storhaug, who competed from the late 1960s to the early 1970s.

He speaks Norwegian, Italian and English.
