= Stian Skjerahaug =

Norwegian artistic gymnast

- Full name: Stian Skjerahaug
- Born: 8 March 1992 (age 34) Sola Municipality, Norway
- Height: 1.71 m (5 ft 7 in)

Gymnastics career
- Discipline: Men's artistic gymnastics
- Country represented: Norway; (2010–2021)
- Club: Stavanger Turnforening
- Head coach: Vyacheslav Strokin (RUS)

Stian Skjerahaug (born 8 March 1992) was a Norwegian male artistic gymnast, representing his nation in international competitions. He participated at the 2015 European Games in Baku, Azerbaijan, and qualified for the 2016 Summer Olympics.
