= Northern European Gymnastics Championships =

The Northern European Gymnastics Championships is an artistic gymnastics competition for both male and female gymnasts from countries and dependencies from around Northern Europe.

== Participant nations ==
- Denmark
- Faroe Islands
- Finland
- Iceland
- Ireland
- Northern Ireland
- Isle of Man
- Norway
- Scotland
- Sweden
- Wales
- England

== Editions ==
Year	Host city	Country
2001	Helsinki	Finland
2002	Unknown	Unknown
2003	Glasgow	Scotland
2004	Nakskov	Denmark
2005	Lisburn	Northern Ireland
2006	Sandnes	Norway
2007	Dublin	(Republic of Ireland) Ireland
2008	Kópavogur	Iceland
2009	Cardiff	Wales
2010	Turku	Finland
2011	Uppsala	Sweden
2012	Glasgow	Scotland
2013	Lisburn	Northern Ireland
2014	Greve	Denmark
2015	Limerick	(Republic of Ireland) Ireland
2016	Trondheim	Norway
2017	Tórshavn	Faroe Islands
2019	Kópavogur	Iceland
2020	Cardiff	Cancelled due to the COVID-19 pandemic
2021	Cardiff	Wales
2022	Jyväskylä	Finland
2023	Halmstad	Sweden
2024	Dublin	(Republic of Ireland) Ireland
2025	Leicester	England
2026	Aalborg	Denmark
