= British Gymnastics Championships =

National artistic gymnastics competition in the UK

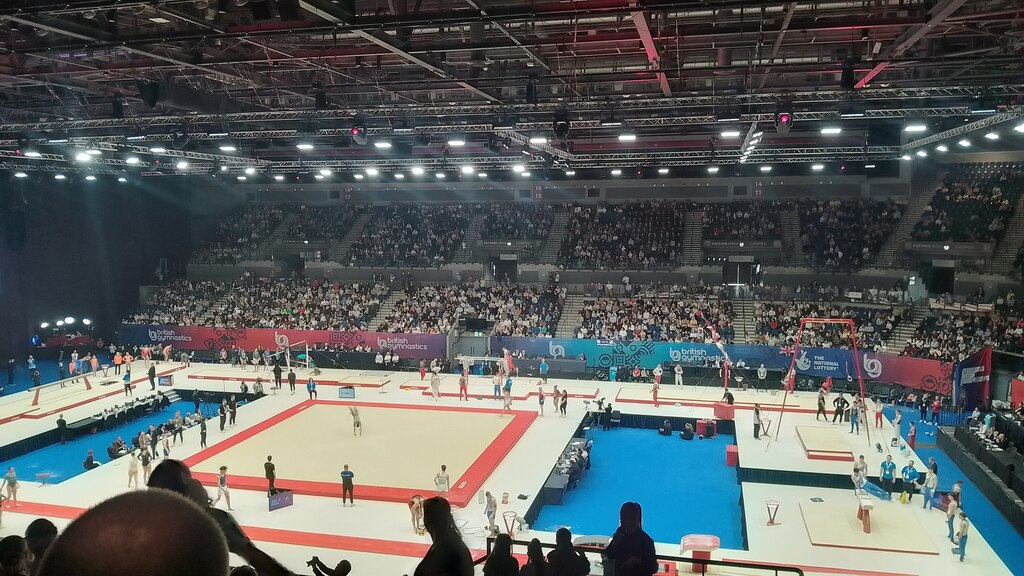
Multiple events being contested at the 2026 championships in Liverpool

The British Gymnastics Championships is an annual artistic gymnastics national competition held in the United Kingdom for elite-level gymnasts. It is organized by British Gymnastics, the governing body for gymnastics in the United Kingdom. It is used as a selection event for the men's and women's national team.

In recent years the competition has taken place near the end of March at the Liverpool Arena and includes men's, women's, junior and espoir competitions, with a joint qualification and all-around followed by apparatus finals.

== History ==
The British Gymnastics Men's trophy is the oldest in the sport, starting in 1896 with the first women's competition starting in 1924. The Royal Albert Hall was the first major venue to host the championships, starting in 1961 until 1971.

== Qualification ==
Senior gymnasts qualify by attaining an all-around ranking through a Home Nation Championships, with the top ranked gymnasts entering the competition (maximum 54). To achieve a ranking, gymnasts will need to be able to provide proof of achieving a minimum score of 41.50 from the previous years British Championships, Home Nations Competition, a regional FIG competition or Club Team Championships. They will then be ranked on their score achieved.

== Women's Championships ==
Modern Winners at the Women's British Gymnastics Championships (2000+)
Senior Women
Year	Location		All-Around	Vault	Uneven Bars	Balance Beam	Floor
2000s
2000	Guildford	1st place, gold medalist(s)	Emma Williams	Emma Williams	Caroline Gilbert	Emma Williams	Annika Reeder
2000	Guildford	2nd place, silver medalist(s)	Annika Reeder	Paula Thomas	Emma Williams	Annika Reeder	Emma Williams
2000	Guildford	3rd place, bronze medalist(s)	Kelly Hackman	Annika Reeder	Annika Reeder	Kelly Hackman	Kelly Hackman
2001	Guildford	1st place, gold medalist(s)	Beth Tweddle	Holly Murdock	Beth Tweddle	Holly Murdock	Nicola Willis
2001	Guildford	2nd place, silver medalist(s)	Holly Murdock	Nicola Willis	Holly Murdock	Louise Hill	Beth Tweddle
2001	Guildford	3rd place, bronze medalist(s)	Melissa Wilcox	Katy Lennon	Nicola Willis	Sam Perry	Gayle Campbell
2002		1st place, gold medalist(s)	Beth Tweddle	Katy Lennon	Beth Tweddle	Beth Tweddle	Nicola Willis
2002		2nd place, silver medalist(s)	Nicola Willis	Gayle Campbell	Rebecca Mason	Nicola Willis	Katy Lennon
2002		3rd place, bronze medalist(s)	Katy Lennon	Beth Tweddle	Nicola Willis	Renay Jones	Eva Nobbs
2003	Guildford	1st place, gold medalist(s)	Beth Tweddle		Beth Tweddle	Beth Tweddle	Beth Tweddle
2003	Guildford	2nd place, silver medalist(s)	Rebecca Mason				
2003	Guildford	3rd place, bronze medalist(s)	Vanessa Hobbs				
2004		1st place, gold medalist(s)	Beth Tweddle				
2004		2nd place, silver medalist(s)	Katy Lennon				
2004		3rd place, bronze medalist(s)	Nicola Willis				
2005	Guildford	1st place, gold medalist(s)	Beth Tweddle	Beth Tweddle	Beth Tweddle	Beth Tweddle	Beth Tweddle
2005	Guildford	2nd place, silver medalist(s)	Samantha Bayley				
2005	Guildford	3rd place, bronze medalist(s)	Imogen Cairns				
2006	Guildford	1st place, gold medalist(s)	Beth Tweddle	Emma White	Beth Tweddle	Beth Tweddle	Beth Tweddle
2006	Guildford	2nd place, silver medalist(s)	Lynette Lisle	Imogen Cairns	Lynette Lisle	Aisling Williams	Imogen Cairns
2006	Guildford	3rd place, bronze medalist(s)	Aisling Williams	Leigh Rogers	Imogen Cairns	Lynette Lisle	Aisling Williams
2007		1st place, gold medalist(s)	Beth Tweddle				
2007		2nd place, silver medalist(s)	Hannah Clowes				
2007		3rd place, bronze medalist(s)	Aisling Williams				
2008	Guildford	1st place, gold medalist(s)	Becky Downie	Imogen Cairns	Becky Downie	Hannah Whelan	Imogen Cairns
2008	Guildford	2nd place, silver medalist(s)	Rebecca Wing	Marissa King	Beth Tweddle	Imogen Cairns	Hannah Whelan
2008	Guildford	3rd place, bronze medalist(s)	Hannah Whelan	Rebecca Purcell	Rebecca Wing	Aisling Williams	Kayleigh Cooke
2009	Guildford	1st place, gold medalist(s)	Becky Downie	Marissa King	Becky Downie	Becky Downie	Becky Downie
2009	Guildford	2nd place, silver medalist(s)	Rebecca Wing	Becky Downie	Rebecca Wing	Hannah Whelan	Rebecca Wing
2009	Guildford	3rd place, bronze medalist(s)	Marissa King	Rebecca Purcell	Marissa King	Rebecca Wing	Marissa King
2010s
2010	Guildford	1st place, gold medalist(s)	Hannah Whelan	Imogen Cairns	Beth Tweddle	Danusia Francis	Danusia Francis
2010	Guildford	2nd place, silver medalist(s)	Nicole Hibbert	Marissa King	Nicole Hibbert	Hannah Whelan	Niamh Rippin
2010	Guildford	3rd place, bronze medalist(s)	Danusia Francis	Nicole Hibbert	Hannah Whelan	Rebecca Wing	Hannah Whelan
2011	Liverpool	1st place, gold medalist(s)	Hannah Whelan	Imogen Cairns	Beth Tweddle	Danusia Francis	Beth Tweddle
2011	Liverpool	2nd place, silver medalist(s)	Danusia Francis	Danielle McNaney	Hannah Whelan	Hannah Whelan	Niamh Rippin
2011	Liverpool	3rd place, bronze medalist(s)	Jennifer Pinches	Niamh Rippin	Jennifer Pinches	Imogen Cairns	Jennifer Pinches
2012	Liverpool	1st place, gold medalist(s)	Rebecca Tunney	Niamh Rippin	Beth Tweddle	Jennifer Pinches	Niamh Rippin
2012	Liverpool	2nd place, silver medalist(s)	Jennifer Pinches	Jennifer Pinches	Rebecca Tunney	Becky Downie	Imogen Cairns
2012	Liverpool	3rd place, bronze medalist(s)	Hannah Whelan	Kelly Simm	Ruby Harrold	Hannah Whelan	Hannah Whelan
2013	Liverpool	1st place, gold medalist(s)	Gabrielle Jupp	Niamh Rippin	Becky Downie	Gabrielle Jupp	Gabrielle Jupp
2013	Liverpool	2nd place, silver medalist(s)	Charlie Fellows	Kelly Simm	Gabrielle Jupp	Hannah Whelan	Raer Theaker
2013	Liverpool	3rd place, bronze medalist(s)	Niamh Rippin	Amy Regan	Ruby Harrold	Georgina Hockenhull	Niamh Rippin
2014	Liverpool	1st place, gold medalist(s)	Rebecca Tunney	Kelly Simm	Rebecca Tunney	Becky Downie	Elizabeth Beddoe
2014	Liverpool	2nd place, silver medalist(s)	Becky Downie	Claudia Fragapane	Becky Downie	Hannah Whelan	Emily Crowe
2014	Liverpool	3rd place, bronze medalist(s)	Claudia Fragapane	Emma White	Claudia Fragapane	Rebecca Tunney	Hannah Whelan
2015	Liverpool	1st place, gold medalist(s)	Amy Tinkler	Claudia Fragapane	Tyesha Mattis	Tyesha Mattis	Amy Tinkler
2015	Liverpool	2nd place, silver medalist(s)	Claudia Fragapane	Kelly Simm	Ellie Downie	Georgina Hockenhull	Claudia Fragapane
2015	Liverpool	3rd place, bronze medalist(s)	Ellie Downie	Ellie Downie	Claudia Fragapane	Claudia Fragapane	Lisa Mason
2016	Liverpool	1st place, gold medalist(s)	Claudia Fragapane	Ellie Downie	Gabrielle Jupp	Becky Downie	Amy Tinkler
2016	Liverpool	2nd place, silver medalist(s)	Rebecca Tunney	Claudia Fragapane	Becky Downie	Claudia Fragapane	Claudia Fragapane
2016	Liverpool	3rd place, bronze medalist(s)	Ellie Downie	Abigail Solari	Ruby Harrold	Ruby Harrold	Phoebe Turner
2017	Liverpool	1st place, gold medalist(s)	Ellie Downie	Ellie Downie	Ellie Downie	Phoebe Turner	Maisie Methuen
2017	Liverpool	2nd place, silver medalist(s)	Alice Kinsella	Holly Jones	Georgia-Mae Fenton	Latalia Bevan	Claudia Fragapane
2017	Liverpool	3rd place, bronze medalist(s)	Maisie Methuen	Phoebe Turner	Becky Downie	Lana Chilton	Charlie Fellows
2018	Liverpool	1st place, gold medalist(s)	Kelly Simm	Holly Jones	Kelly Simm	Maisie Methuen	Amy Tinkler
2018	Liverpool	2nd place, silver medalist(s)	Amy Tinkler	Amy Tinkler	Charlie Fellows	Alice Kinsella	Taeja James
2018	Liverpool	3rd place, bronze medalist(s)	Charlie Fellows	Taeja James	Emily Thomas	Kelly Simm	Charlie Fellows
2019	Liverpool	1st place, gold medalist(s)	Ellie Downie	Ellie Downie	Georgia-Mae Fenton	Georgia-Mae Fenton	Ellie Downie
2019	Liverpool	2nd place, silver medalist(s)	Kelly Simm	Phoebe Jakubczyk	Alice Kinsella	Jessica Daykin	Claudia Fragapane
2019	Liverpool	3rd place, bronze medalist(s)	Amelie Morgan	Megan Bridge	Amelie Morgan	Amelie Morgan	Taeja James
2020s
2020	Cancelled due to COVID-19						
2021	Guildford	1st place, gold medalist(s)	Ondine Achampong	Holly Jones	Ruby Stacey	Halle Hilton	Megan Bridge
2021	Guildford	2nd place, silver medalist(s)	Emily Todd	Megan Bridge	Ondine Achampong	Ondine Achampong	Emily Todd
2021	Guildford	3rd place, bronze medalist(s)	Ruby Stacey	Emily Roper	Kelly Simm	Emily Roper	Ondine Achampong
2022	Liverpool	1st place, gold medalist(s)	Jessica Gadirova	Jessica Gadirova	Alice Kinsella	Jennifer Gadirova	Jessica Gadirova
2022	Liverpool	2nd place, silver medalist(s)	Ondine Achampong	Emily Roper	Georgia-Mae Fenton	Jessica Gadirova	Jennifer Gadirova
2022	Liverpool	3rd place, bronze medalist(s)	Jennifer Gadirova	Sofia Micallef	Jennifer Gadirova	Georgia-Mae Fenton	Georgia-Mae Fenton
2023	Liverpool	1st place, gold medalist(s)	Alice Kinsella	Ruby Evans	Becky Downie	Ondine Achampong	Alice Kinsella
2023	Liverpool	2nd place, silver medalist(s)	Ondine Achampong	Emily Roper	Georgia-Mae Fenton	Jessica Gadirova	Poppy-Grace Stickler
2023	Liverpool	3rd place, bronze medalist(s)	Georgia-Mae Fenton	Keira Thornton	Alice Kinsella	Alice Kinsella	Georgia-Mae Fenton
2024	Liverpool	1st place, gold medalist(s)	Ondine Achampong	Shannon Archer	Ondine Achampong	Ondine Achampong	Ondine Achampong
2024	Liverpool	2nd place, silver medalist(s)	Ruby Evans	Abigail Martin	Ruby Stacey	Amelie Morgan	Mali Morgan
2024	Liverpool	3rd place, bronze medalist(s)	Abigail Martin	Emily Roper	Amelie Morgan	Abigail Martin	Emily Roper
2025	Liverpool	1st place, gold medalist(s)	Alia Leat	Isabelle Priestly	Emily Roper	Frances Stone	Alia Leat
2025	Liverpool	2nd place, silver medalist(s)	Frances Stone	Frances Stone	Jessica Gadirova	Ema Kandalova	Jemima Taylor
2025	Liverpool	3rd place, bronze medalist(s)	Emily Roper	Abigail Roper	Ellie Lewis	Lottie Smith	Ema Kandalova
2026	Liverpool	1st place, gold medalist(s)	Ruby Evans	Abigail Martin	Becky Downie	Alia Leat	Ruby Evans
2026	Liverpool	2nd place, silver medalist(s)	Ruby Stacey	Emily Roper	Shantae-Eve Amankwaah	Ruby Stacey	Abigail Martin
2026	Liverpool	3rd place, bronze medalist(s)	Shantae-Eve Amankwaah	Andrea Ndoro	Jemima Taylor	Frances Stone	Erin Broughton

== Men's Championships ==
Modern Winners at the Men's British Gymnastics Championships (2000+)

Senior Men
Year	Location		All-Around	Floor	Pommel Horse	Still Rings	Vault	Parallel Bars	High Bar
2000s
2000		1st place, gold medalist(s)	Kanukai Jackson						
2000		2nd place, silver medalist(s)	Dominic Brindle						
2000		3rd place, bronze medalist(s)	John Smethurst						
2001		1st place, gold medalist(s)	David Eaton						
2001		2nd place, silver medalist(s)	Ross Brewer						
2001		3rd place, bronze medalist(s)	James Evans						
2002		1st place, gold medalist(s)	Kanukai Jackson						
2002		2nd place, silver medalist(s)	Barry Collie						
2002		3rd place, bronze medalist(s)	Ross Brewer						
2003		1st place, gold medalist(s)	Ross Brewer						
2003		2nd place, silver medalist(s)	Simon Moore						
2003		3rd place, bronze medalist(s)	Darren Gerard						
2004		1st place, gold medalist(s)	Ross Brewer						
2004		2nd place, silver medalist(s)	Simon Moore						
2004		3rd place, bronze medalist(s)	Kirk Zammit						
2005		1st place, gold medalist(s)	Ross Brewer						
2005		2nd place, silver medalist(s)	Simon Moore						
2005		3rd place, bronze medalist(s)	David Eaton						
2006	Wigan	1st place, gold medalist(s)	Ross Brewer	Steven Jehu	Dan Keatings	David Massam	Danny Lawrence	Ruslan Panteleymonov	David Eaton
2006	Wigan	2nd place, silver medalist(s)	David Eaton	Ruslan Panteleymonov	Louis Smith	Ross Brewer	Luke Folwell	Adam Cox	Kristian Thomas
2006	Wigan	3rd place, bronze medalist(s)	Luke Folwell	Adam Cox	David Eaton	Danny Lawrence	Kristian Thomas	Ross Brewer	Ross Brewer
2007	Wigan	1st place, gold medalist(s)	Dan Keatings	Kristian Thomas	Louis Smith	Ross Brewer	Theo Seager	Adam Cox	Yevgen Gryshchenko
2007	Wigan	2nd place, silver medalist(s)	Luke Folwell	Yevgen Gryshchenko	Kristian Thomas	Luke Folwell	Nathan Jones	Yevgen Gryshchenko	Dan Keatings
2007	Wigan	3rd place, bronze medalist(s)	Ross Brewer	Dan Keatings	Dan Keatings	Reiss Beckford	Luke Folwell	Ross Brewer	Reece Pearson
2008		1st place, gold medalist(s)	Kristian Thomas	Theo Seager	Louis Smith	Daniel Purvis	Theo Seager	Dan Keatings	Kristian Thomas
2008		2nd place, silver medalist(s)	Luke Folwell						
2008		3rd place, bronze medalist(s)	Steve Jehu						
2009	London	1st place, gold medalist(s)	Dan Keatings	Dan Keatings	Louis Smith	Danny Lawrence	Kristian Thomas	Dan Keatings	Dan Keatings
2009	London	2nd place, silver medalist(s)	Kristian Thomas	Steven Jehu	Dan Keatings	Kristian Thomas	Luke Folwell	Luke Folwell	Yevgen Gryshchenko
2009	London	3rd place, bronze medalist(s)	Luke Folwell	Kristian Thomas	Kristian Thomas	Luke Folwell	Ryan McKee	Adam Cox	Kristian Thomas
2010s
2010	Leicester	1st place, gold medalist(s)	Daniel Purvis Sam Hunter (joint 2nd)	Daniel Purvis	Max Whitlock	Samuel Fern	Ruslan Panteleymonov	Ruslan Panteleymonov	Sam Hunter
2010	Leicester	2nd place, silver medalist(s)	Daniel Purvis Sam Hunter (joint 2nd)	Theo Seager	Daniel Purvis	Theo Seager	Theo Seager	Ashley Watson	Sam Oldham
2010	Leicester	3rd place, bronze medalist(s)	Ruslan Panteleymonov	Ruslan Panteleymonov	Matthew Firth	Luke Folwell	Luke Folwell	Daniel Purvis	Theo Seager
2011	Stoke-on-Trent	1st place, gold medalist(s)	Daniel Purvis	Daniel Purvis	Max Whitlock	Daniel Purvis	Kristian Thomas	Dan Keatings	Kristian Thomas
2011	Stoke-on-Trent	2nd place, silver medalist(s)	Dan Keatings	Kristian Thomas	Dan Keatings	Kristian Thomas	Ruslan Panteleymonov	Daniel Purvis	Daniel Purvis
2011	Stoke-on-Trent	3rd place, bronze medalist(s)	Kristian Thomas	Andrew Smith	Louis Smith	Ruslan Panteleymonov	Reiss Beckford	Max Whitlock	Dan Keatings
2012	Liverpool	1st place, gold medalist(s)	Daniel Purvis	Kristian Thomas	Louis Smith	Daniel Purvis	Kristian Thomas	Dan Keatings	Sam Oldham
2012	Liverpool	2nd place, silver medalist(s)	Sam Oldham	Sam Oldham	Max Whitlock	Courtney Tulloch	Ruslan Panteleymonov	Daniel Purvis	Daniel Purvis
2012	Liverpool	3rd place, bronze medalist(s)	Dan Keatings	Daniel Purvis	Daniel Purvis	Kristian Thomas	Clinton Purnell	Frank Baines	Dan Keatings
2013	Liverpool	1st place, gold medalist(s)	Max Whitlock	Sam Oldham	Dan Keatings	Theo Seager	Theo Seager	Dan Keatings	Max Whitlock
2013	Liverpool	2nd place, silver medalist(s)	Daniel Purvis	Max Whitlock	Max Whitlock	Sam Fern	Cameron Mackenzie	Max Whitlock	Frank Baines
2013	Liverpool	3rd place, bronze medalist(s)	Mathew Firth	Giarnni Regini-Moran	Daniel Purvis Anthony Wise (joint 3rd)	Reiss Beckford	Clinton Purnell	Sam Oldham	Nile Wilson
2014	Liverpool	1st place, gold medalist(s)	Max Whitlock	Max Whitlock	Dan Keatings	Max Whitlock	Sam Oldham	Dan Keatings	Brinn Bevan
2014	Liverpool	2nd place, silver medalist(s)	Daniel Purvis	Giarnni Regini-Moran	Max Whitlock	Daniel Purvis	Daniel Purvis	Daniel Purvis	Ashley Watson
2014	Liverpool	3rd place, bronze medalist(s)	Dan Keatings	Frank Baines Reiss Beckford(joint 3rd)	Louis Smith	Theo Seager Sam Oldham (joint 3rd)	Dominick Cunningham	Max Whitlock	Sam Oldham
2015	Liverpool	1st place, gold medalist(s)	Daniel Purvis	Giarnni Regini-Moran	Louis Smith	Courtney Tulloch	Giarnni Regini-Moran	Ashley Watson	Ashley Watson
2015	Liverpool	2nd place, silver medalist(s)	Frank Baines	Dominick Cunningham	Max Whitlock	Sam Oldham	Kristian Thomas	Giarnni Regini-Moran	Kristian Thomas
2015	Liverpool	3rd place, bronze medalist(s)	Sam Oldham	Daniel Purvis	James Hall	Kristian Thomas	Dominick Cunningham	Daniel Purvis	Reiss Beckford
2016	Liverpool	1st place, gold medalist(s)	Max Whitlock	Max Whitlock	Max Whitlock	Courtney Tulloch	Giarnni Regini-Moran	Ashley Watson	Nile Wilson
2016	Liverpool	2nd place, silver medalist(s)	Daniel Purvis	Daniel Purvis	Louis Smith	Nile Wilson	Dominick Cunningham	Max Whitlock	Max Whitlock
2016	Liverpool	3rd place, bronze medalist(s)	Nile Wilson	Sam Oldham	Rhys McClenaghan	Max Whitlock	Ewan McAteer	Reiss Beckford	Sam Oldham
2017	Liverpool	1st place, gold medalist(s)	Joe Fraser	Andrew Smith	Rhys McClenaghan	Courtney Tulloch	Ewan McAteer	James Hall	Joe Fraser
2017	Liverpool	2nd place, silver medalist(s)	Dominick Cunningham James Hall (joint 2nd)	Hamish Carter	Prashanth Sellathurai	Joe Fraser	Dominick Cunningham	Donell Osbourne	Joshua Nathan
2017	Liverpool	3rd place, bronze medalist(s)	Dominick Cunningham James Hall (joint 2nd)	Jamie Lewis	Korben Fellows	Reiss Beckford	Gabriel Hannah	Joe Fraser	Donell Osbourne
2018	Liverpool	1st place, gold medalist(s)	Brinn Bevan	Max Whitlock	Max Whitlock	Nile Wilson	Jake Jarman	Nile Wilson	Nile Wilson
2018	Liverpool	2nd place, silver medalist(s)	Dominick Cunningham	Gaius Thompson	Brinn Bevan	Dominick Cunningham	Hamish Carter	Daniel Purvis	Hamish Carter
2018	Liverpool	3rd place, bronze medalist(s)	Daniel Purvis	Josh Cook	Ieuan Davies	Daniel Purvis	Dominick Cunningham	Frank Baines	Brinn Bevan
2019	Liverpool	1st place, gold medalist(s)	James Hall	Giarnni Regini-Moran	Max Whitlock	James Hall	Jake Jarman	Joe Fraser	Joe Fraser
2019	Liverpool	2nd place, silver medalist(s)	Giarnni Regini-Moran	Jake Jarman	Adam Steele	Jamie Lewis	Giarnni Regini-Moran	Giarnni Regini-Moran	Josh Cook
2019	Liverpool	3rd place, bronze medalist(s)	Jamie Lewis	Adam Steele	James Hall	Pavel Karnejenko	Pavel Karnejenko	Max Whitlock	Matthew Boardman
2020s
2020	Cancelled due to COVID-19								
2021	Guildford	1st place, gold medalist(s)	Joshua Nathan	Sam Mostowfi	Joshua Nathan	Courtney Tulloch	Dominick Cunningham	Brinn Bevan	Sam Oldham
2021	Guildford	2nd place, silver medalist(s)	Joe Cemlyn-Jones	Dominick Cunningham	Frank Baines	Joe Cemlyn-Jones	Hayden Skinner	Joe Cemlyn-Jones	Joshua Nathan
2021	Guildford	3rd place, bronze medalist(s)	Dominick Cunningham	Joe Cemlyn-Jones	Cameron Lynn	Dominick Cunningham	Sam Mostowfi	Joshua Nathan	Dominick Cunningham
2022	Liverpool	1st place, gold medalist(s)	Joe Fraser	Joe Fraser	Joe Fraser	Courtney Tulloch	Jake Jarman	Giarnni Regini-Moran	Joe Fraser
2022	Liverpool	2nd place, silver medalist(s)	James Hall	Giarnni Regini-Moran	Jake Jarman	Pavel Karnejenko	Harry Hepworth	Joe Fraser	Joshua Nathan
2022	Liverpool	3rd place, bronze medalist(s)	Jake Jarman	Luke Whitehouse	Joshua Nathan	Harry Hepworth	Owen Print	Brinn Bevan	Pavel Karnejenko
2023	Liverpool	1st place, gold medalist(s)	Adam Tobin	Luke Whitehouse	Joshua Nathan	Courtney Tulloch	Jake Jarman	Jake Jarman	Adam Tobin
2023	Liverpool	2nd place, silver medalist(s)	Jake Jarman	Jake Jarman	Jamie Lewis	Pavel Karnejenko	Harry Hepworth	Adam Tobin	Jake Jarman
2023	Liverpool	3rd place, bronze medalist(s)	Pavel Karnejenko	Harry Hepworth	Jack Stanley	Adam Tobin	Luke Whitehouse	Joshua Nathan	Joe Cemlyn-Jones
2024	Liverpool	1st place, gold medalist(s)	Joe Fraser	Jake Jarman	Max Whitlock	Harry Hepworth	Jake Jarman	Joe Fraser	Jake Jarman
2024	Liverpool	2nd place, silver medalist(s)	Jake Jarman	Joe Fraser	Jake Jarman	Courtney Tulloch	Remell Robinson-Bailey	Adam Tobin	Reuben Ward
2024	Liverpool	3rd place, bronze medalist(s)	Courtney Tulloch	Sam Mostowfi	Joe Fraser	James Hall	Luke Whitehouse	Courtney Tulloch	Max Whitlock
2025	Liverpool	1st place, gold medalist(s)	Jamie Lewis	Luke Whitehouse	Jamie Lewis	Courtney Tulloch	Jake Jarman	Jake Jarman	Jamie Lewis
2025	Liverpool	2nd place, silver medalist(s)	Jonas Rushworth	Jacob Edwards	Jake Jarman	Harry Hepworth	Harry Hepworth	Jonas Rushworth	Winston Powell
2025	Liverpool	3rd place, bronze medalist(s)	Luke Whitehouse	Adam Tobin	Cameron Lynn	Jamie Lewis	Lewis Henry	Jack Stanley	Adam Tobin
2026	Liverpool	1st place, gold medalist(s)	Joe Fraser	Jake Jarman	Reuben Ward	Harry Hepworth	Sol Scott	Joe Fraser	Joe Fraser
2026	Liverpool	2nd place, silver medalist(s)	Jonas Rushworth	Harry Hepworth	Joshua Nathan	Courtney Tulloch	Jake Jarman	Elliot Vernon	Jake Jarman
2026	Liverpool	3rd place, bronze medalist(s)	Jake Jarman	Luke Whitehouse	Jake Jarman	Joe Fraser	Harry Hepworth	Courtney Tulloch	Alexander Yolshin-Cash

== WAG Records (2000-present) ==
Beth Tweddle has the most individual all-around titles with 7, the most titles across all apparatus with 24 and the most medals in total with 27. Becky Downie follows with 11 titles and 17 medals.

Most WAG Gold Medals at British Championships
	All-Around	Vault	Uneven Bars	Balance Beam	Floor	Total	
Beth Tweddle	(gold) x 7	(gold) x 1 (bronze) x 1	(gold) x 8 (silver) x 1	(gold) x 4	(gold) x 4 (silver) x 1	(gold) x 24; (silver) x 2 (bronze) x 1	27
Becky Downie	(gold) x 2 (silver) x 1	(silver) x 1	(gold) x 5 (silver) x 2 (bronze) x 1	(gold) x 3 (silver) x 1	(gold) x 1	(gold) x 11; (silver) x 5 (bronze) x 1	17
Ellie Downie	(gold) x 2 (bronze) x 2	(gold) x 3 (bronze) x 1	(gold) x 1 (silver) x 1		(gold) x 1	(gold) x 7 (silver) x 1 (bronze) x 3	11
Ondine Achampong	(gold) x 2 (silver) x 2		(gold) x 1 (silver) x 1	(gold) x 2 (silver) x 1	(gold) x 1 (bronze) x 1	(gold) x 6 (silver) x 4 (bronze) x 1	11
Imogen Cairns	(bronze) x 1	(gold) x 3 (silver) x 1	(bronze) x 1	(silver) x 1 (bronze) x 1	(gold) x 1 (silver) x 2	(gold) x 4 (silver) x 4 (bronze) x 3	11
Amy Tinkler	(gold) x 1 (silver) x 1	(silver) x 1			(gold) x 3	(gold) x 4 (silver) x 2	6
Gabrielle Jupp	(gold) x 1		(gold) x 1 (silver) x 1	(gold) x 1	(gold) x 1	(gold) x 4 (silver) x 1	5

Most Decorated WAG Gymnasts at British Championships
	All-Around	Vault	Uneven Bars	Balance Beam	Floor	Total	
Beth Tweddle	(gold) x 7	(gold) x 1 (bronze) x 1	(gold) x 8 (silver) x 1	(gold) x 4	(gold) x 4 (silver) x 1	(gold) x 24; (silver) x 1 (bronze) x 1	27
Becky Downie	(gold) x 2 (silver) x 1	(silver) x 1	(gold) x 5 (silver) x 2 (bronze) x 1	(gold) x 3 (silver) x 1	(gold) x 1	(gold) x 11; (silver) x 5 (bronze) x 1	17
Hannah Whelan	(gold) x 2 (bronze) x 2		(silver) x 1 (bronze) x 1	(gold) x 1 (silver) x 5 (bronze) x 1	(silver) x 1 (bronze) x 3	(gold) x 3 (silver) x 7 (bronze) x 7	17
Claudia Fragapane	(gold) x 1 (silver) x 1 (bronze) x 1	(gold) x 1 (silver) x 2	(bronze) x 2	(silver) x 1 (bronze) x 1	(silver) x 4	(gold) x 2 (silver) x 8 (bronze) x 4	14
Ellie Downie	(gold) x 2 (bronze) x 2	(gold) x 3 (bronze) x 1	(gold) x 1 (silver) x 1		(gold) x 1	(gold) x 7 (silver) x 1 (bronze) x 3	11
Ondine Achampong	(gold) x 2 (silver) x 2		(gold) x 1 (silver) x 1	(gold) x 2 (silver) x 1	(gold) x 1 (bronze) x 1	(gold) x 6 (silver) x 4 (bronze) x 1	11
Imogen Cairns	(bronze) x 1	(gold) x 3 (silver) x 1	(bronze) x 1	(silver) x 1 (bronze) x 1	(gold) x 1 (silver) x 2	(gold) x 4 (silver) x 4 (bronze) x 3	11
Kelly Simm	(gold) x 1 (silver) x 1	(gold) x 1 (silver) x 2 (bronze) x 1	(gold) x 1 (bronze) x 1	(bronze) x 1		(gold) x 3 (silver) x 3 (bronze) x 3	9
Georgia-Mae Fenton	(bronze) x 1		(gold) x 1 (silver) x 3	(gold) x 1 (bronze) x 1	(bronze) x 2	(gold) x 2 (silver) x 3 (bronze) x 4	9
Emily Roper	(bronze) x 1	(silver) x 3 (bronze) x 2	(gold) x 1	(bronze) x 1	(bronze) x 1	(gold) x 1 (silver) x 3 (bronze) x 5	9
Alice Kinsella	(gold) x 1 (silver) x 1		(gold) x 1 (silver) x 1 (bronze) x 1	(silver) x 1 (bronze) x 1	(gold) x 1	(gold) x 3 (silver) x 3 (bronze) x 2	8
Niamh Rippin	(bronze) x 1	(gold) x 2 (bronze) x 1			(gold) x 1 (silver) x 2 (bronze) x 1	(gold) x 3 (silver) x 2 (bronze) x 3	8

== MAG Records (2000-present) ==
Max Whitlock has the most titles across all apparatus with 14, while Daniel Purvis has the most medals in total with 30. Joe Fraser and Daniel Purvis have the most individual all-around titles with 4

Most MAG Gold Medals at British Championships
Year	All-Around	Floor	Pommel Horse	Still Rings	Vault	Parallel Bars	High Bar	Total	
Max Whitlock	(gold) x 3	(gold) x 3 (silver) x 2	(gold) x 6 (silver) x 4	(gold) x 1 (bronze) x 1		(silver) x 2 (bronze) x 2	(gold) x 1 (silver) x 1 (bronze) x 1	(gold) x 14; (silver) x 9 (bronze) x 4	27
Dan Keatings	(gold) x 2 (silver) x 1 (bronze) x 2	(gold) x 1 (bronze) x 1	(gold) x 3 (silver) x 2 (bronze) x 1			(gold) x 6	(gold) x 1 (silver) x 1 (bronze) x 2	(gold) x 13; (silver) x 4 (bronze) x 6	23
Joe Fraser	(gold) x 4	(gold) x 1 (silver) x 1	(gold) x 1 (bronze) x 1	(silver) x 1 (bronze) x 1		(gold) x 3 (silver) x 1 (bronze) x 1	(gold) x 4	(gold) x 13; (silver) x 3 (bronze) x 3	19
Jake Jarman	(silver) x 2 (bronze) x 2	(gold) x 2 (silver) x 2	(silver) x 3 (bronze) x 1		(gold) x 6 (silver) x 1	(gold) x 2	(gold) x 1 (silver) x 2	(gold) x 11; (silver) x 10; (bronze) x 3	24
Daniel Purvis	(gold) x 4 (silver) x 3 (bronze) x 1	(gold) x 2 (silver) x 1 (bronze) x 2	(silver) x 1 (bronze) x 2	(gold) x 3 (silver) x 1 (bronze) x 1	(silver) x 1	(silver) x 4 (bronze) x 2	(silver) x 2	(gold) x 9 (silver) x 13; (bronze) x 8	30
Kristian Thomas	(gold) x 1 (silver) x 1 (bronze) x 1	(gold) x 2 (silver) x 1 (bronze) x 1	(silver) x 1 (bronze) x 1	(silver) x 2 (bronze) x 2	(gold) x 3 (silver) x 1 (bronze) x 1		(gold) x 2 (silver) x 2 (bronze) x 1	(gold) x 8 (silver) x 8 (bronze) x 7	23
Courtney Tulloch	(bronze) x 1			(gold) x 7 (silver) x 3		(bronze) x 2		(gold) x 7 (silver) x 3 (bronze) x 3	13
Louis Smith				(gold) x 5 (silver) x 2 (bronze) x 2				(gold) x 5 (silver) x 2 (bronze) x 2	9

Most Decorated MAG Gymnasts at British Championships
Year	All-Around	Floor	Pommel Horse	Still Rings	Vault	Parallel Bars	High Bar	Total	
Daniel Purvis	(gold) x 4 (silver) x 3 (bronze) x 1	(gold) x 2 (silver) x 1 (bronze) x 2	(silver) x 1 (bronze) x 2	(gold) x 3 (silver) x 1 (bronze) x 1	(silver) x 1	(silver) x 4 (bronze) x 2	(silver) x 2	(gold) x 9 (silver) x 13; (bronze) x 8	30
Max Whitlock	(gold) x 3	(gold) x 3 (silver) x 2	(gold) x 6 (silver) x 4	(gold) x 1 (bronze) x 1		(silver) x 2 (bronze) x 2	(gold) x 1 (silver) x 1 (bronze) x 1	(gold) x 14; (silver) x 9 (bronze) x 4	27
Jake Jarman	(silver) x 2 (bronze) x 2	(gold) x 2 (silver) x 2	(silver) x 3 (bronze) x 1		(gold) x 6 (silver) x 1	(gold) x 2	(gold) x 1 (silver) x 2	(gold) x 11; (silver) x 10; (bronze) x 3	24
Dan Keatings	(gold) x 2 (silver) x 1 (bronze) x 2	(gold) x 1 (bronze) x 1	(gold) x 3 (silver) x 2 (bronze) x 1			(gold) x 6	(gold) x 1 (silver) x 1 (bronze) x 2	(gold) x 13; (silver) x 4 (bronze) x 6	23
Kristian Thomas	(gold) x 1 (silver) x 1 (bronze) x 1	(gold) x 2 (silver) x 1 (bronze) x 1	(silver) x 1 (bronze) x 1	(silver) x 2 (bronze) x 2	(gold) x 3 (silver) x 1 (bronze) x 1		(gold) x 2 (silver) x 2 (bronze) x 1	(gold) x 8 (silver) x 8 (bronze) x 7	23
Joe Fraser	(gold) x 4	(gold) x 1 (silver) x 1	(gold) x 1 (bronze) x 1	(silver) x 1 (bronze) x 1		(gold) x 3 (silver) x 1 (bronze) x 1	(gold) x 4	(gold) x 13; (silver) x 3 (bronze) x 3	19
Dominick Cunningham	(silver) x 2 (bronze) x 1	(silver) x 2		(silver) x 1 (bronze) x 1	(gold) x 1 (silver) x 2 (bronze) x 3		(bronze) x 1	(gold) x 1 (silver) x 7 (bronze) x 6	14
Courtney Tulloch	(bronze) x 1			(gold) x 7 (silver) x 3		(bronze) x 2		(gold) x 7 (silver) x 3 (bronze) x 3	13
Sam Oldham	(silver) x 1 (bronze) x 1	(gold) x 1 (silver) x 1 (bronze) x 1		(silver) x 1	(gold) x 1	(bronze) x 1	(gold) x 2 (silver) x 1 (bronze) x 2	(gold) x 4 (silver) x 4 (bronze) x 5	13

== Gallery ==
Multi-time British Women's Medallist (>10)

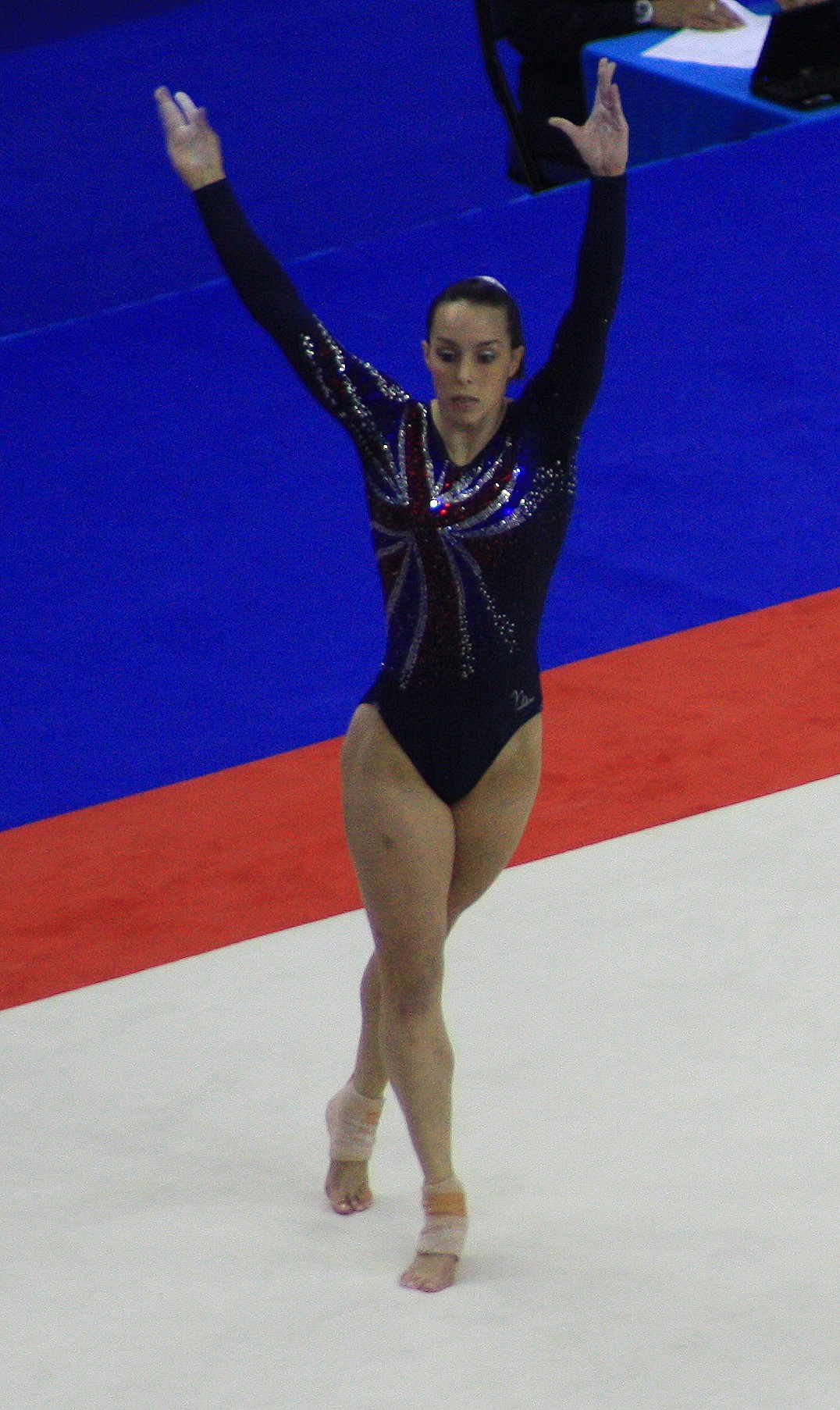
Beth Tweddle
27 x British medallist

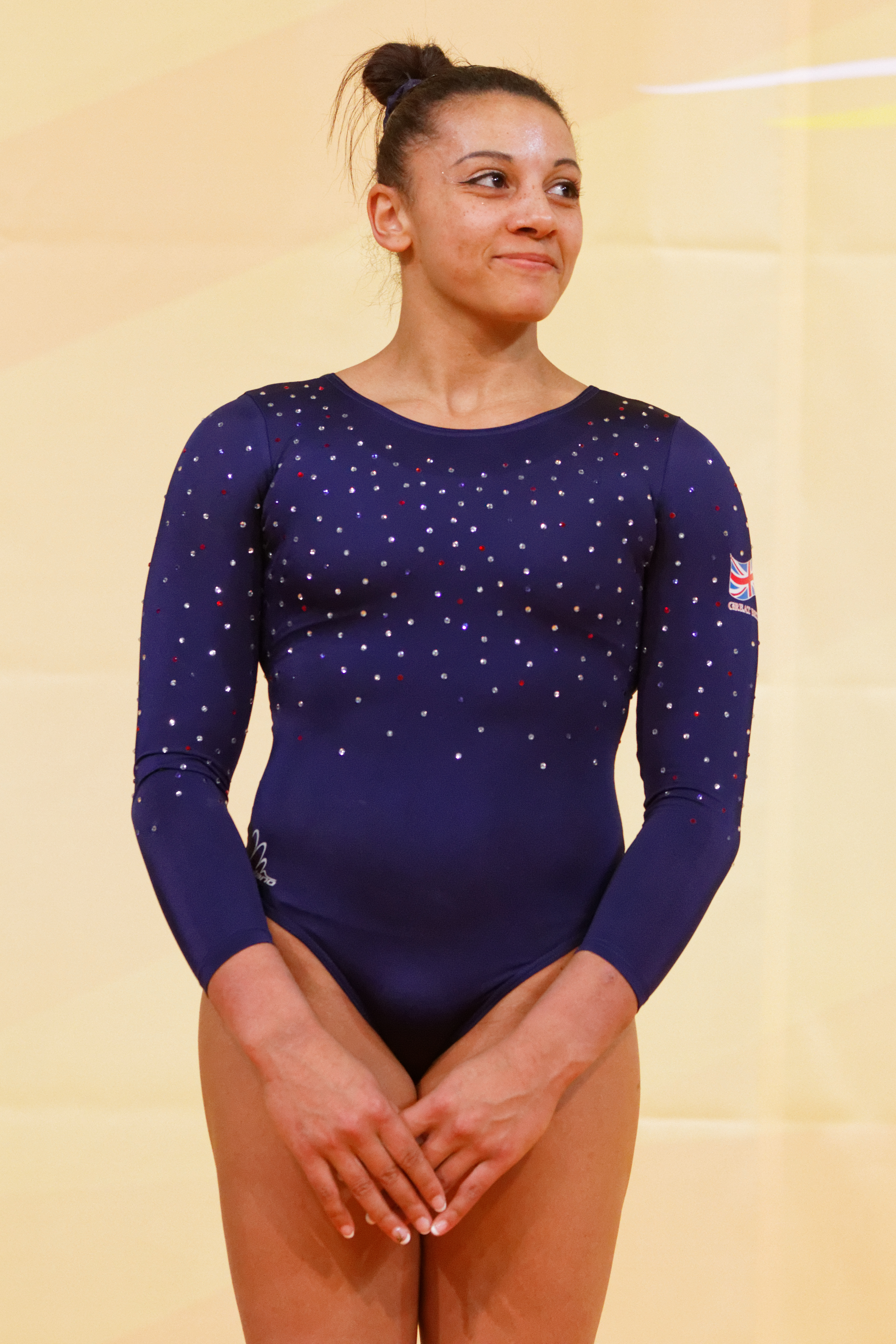
Becky Downie
17 x British medallist

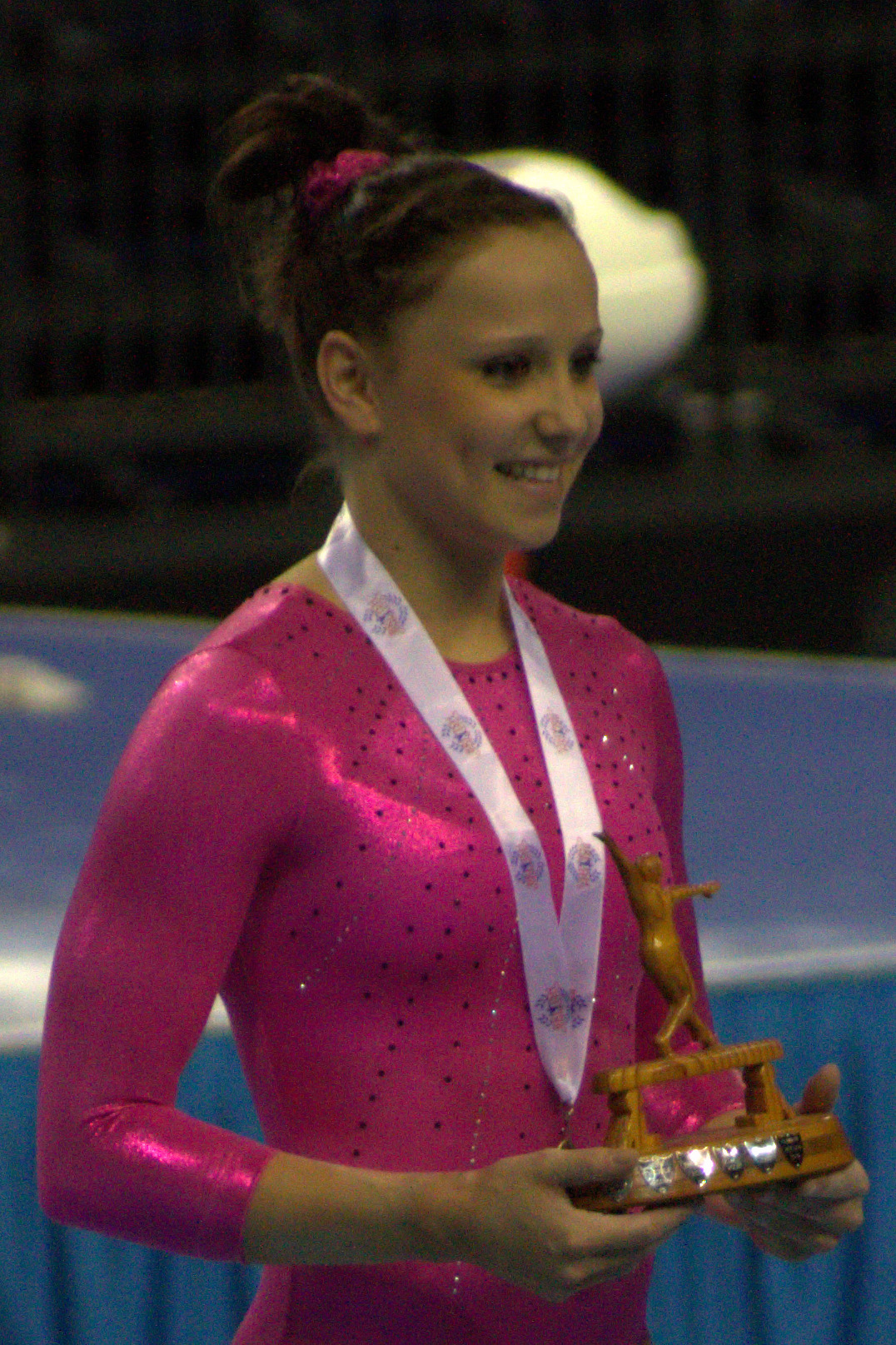
Hannah Whelan
17 x British medallist

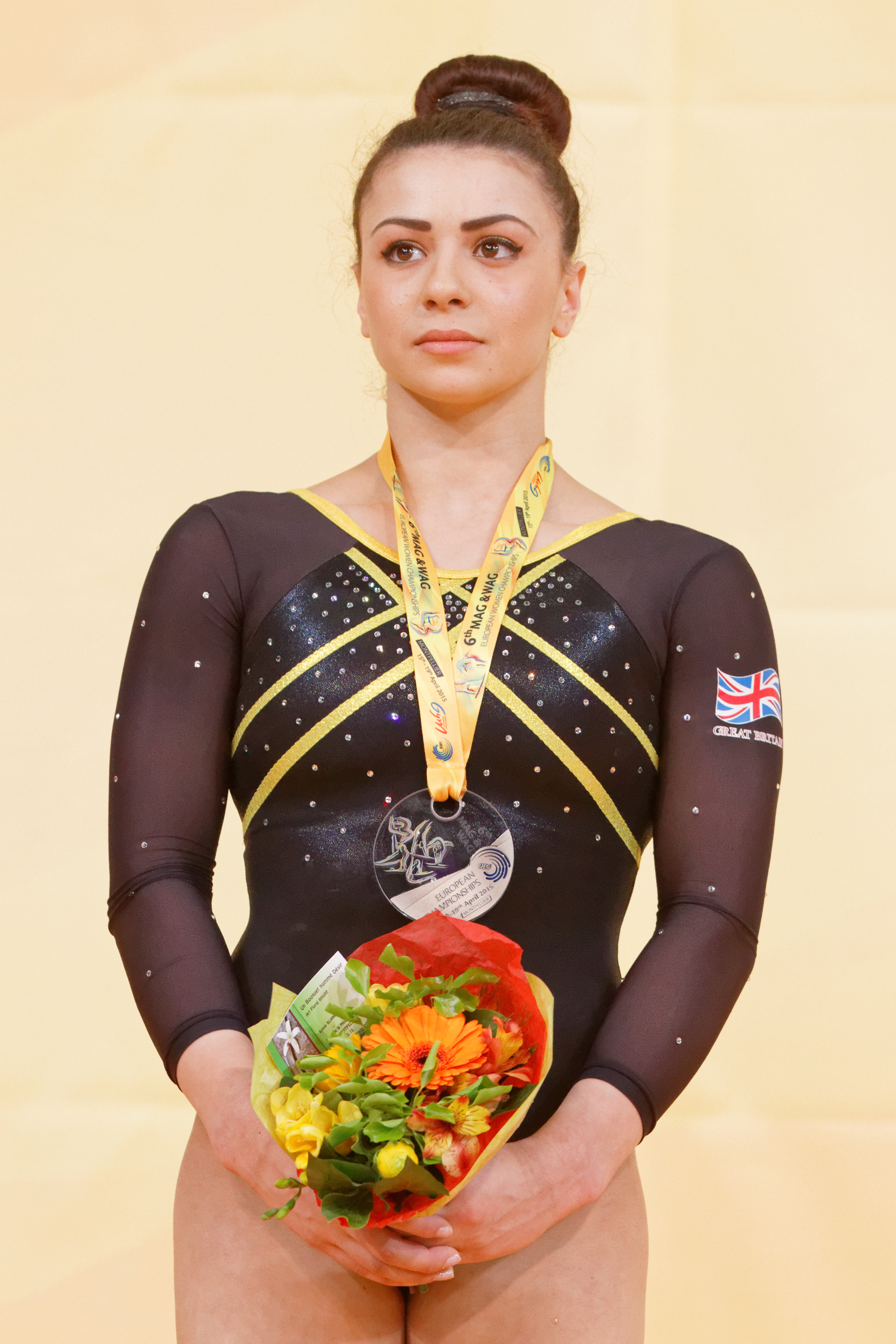
Claudia Fragapane
14 x British medallist

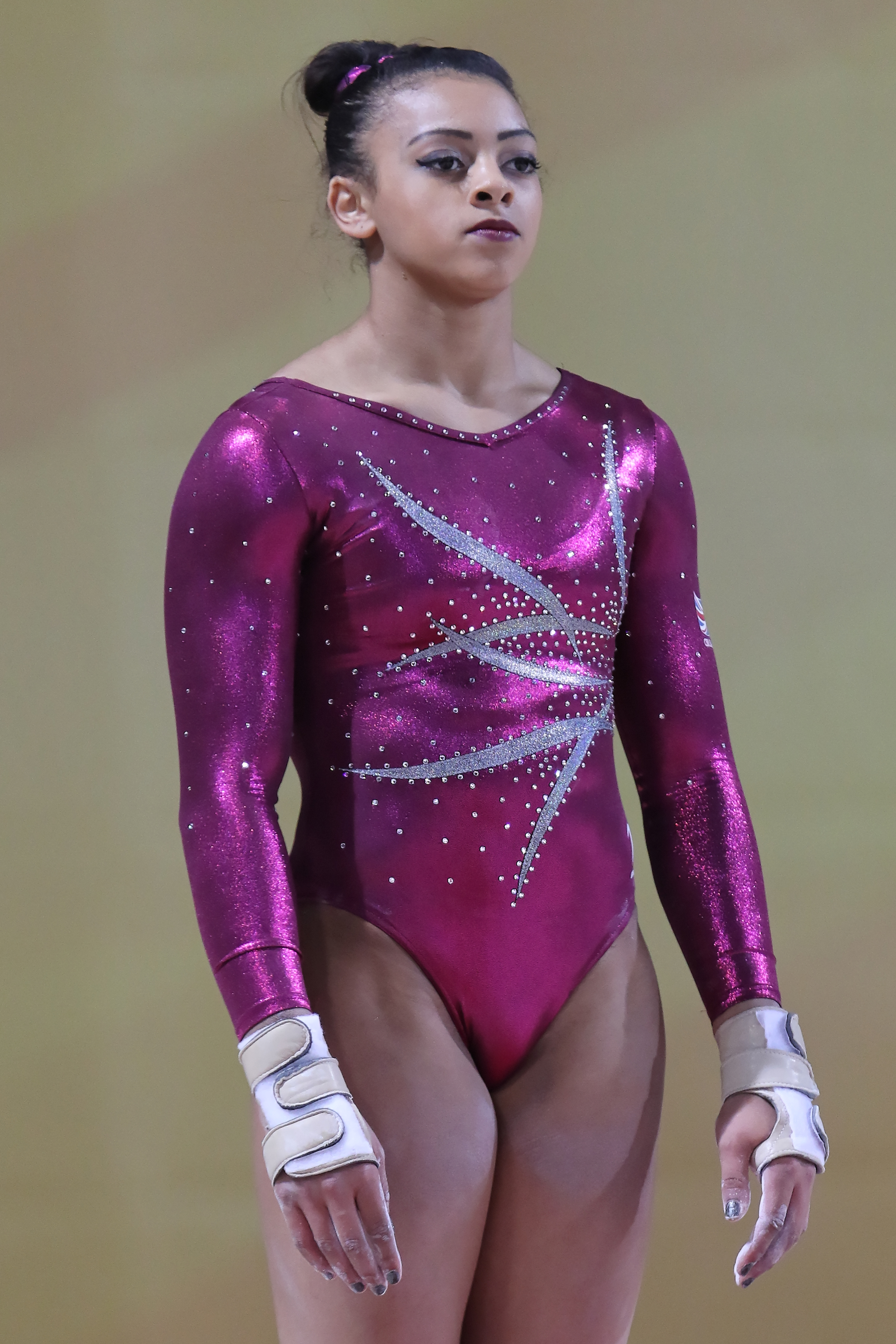
Ellie Downie
11 x British medallist

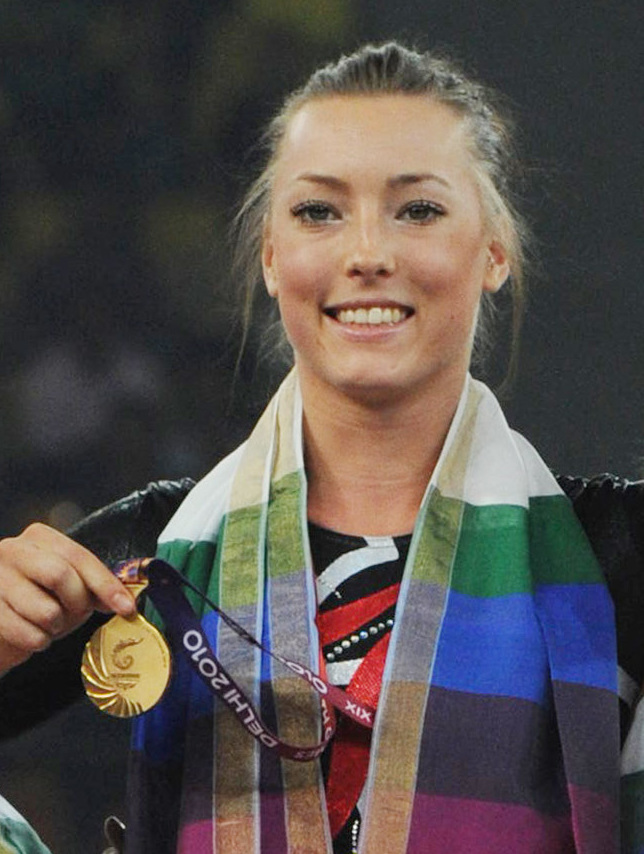
Imogen Cairns
11 x British medallist

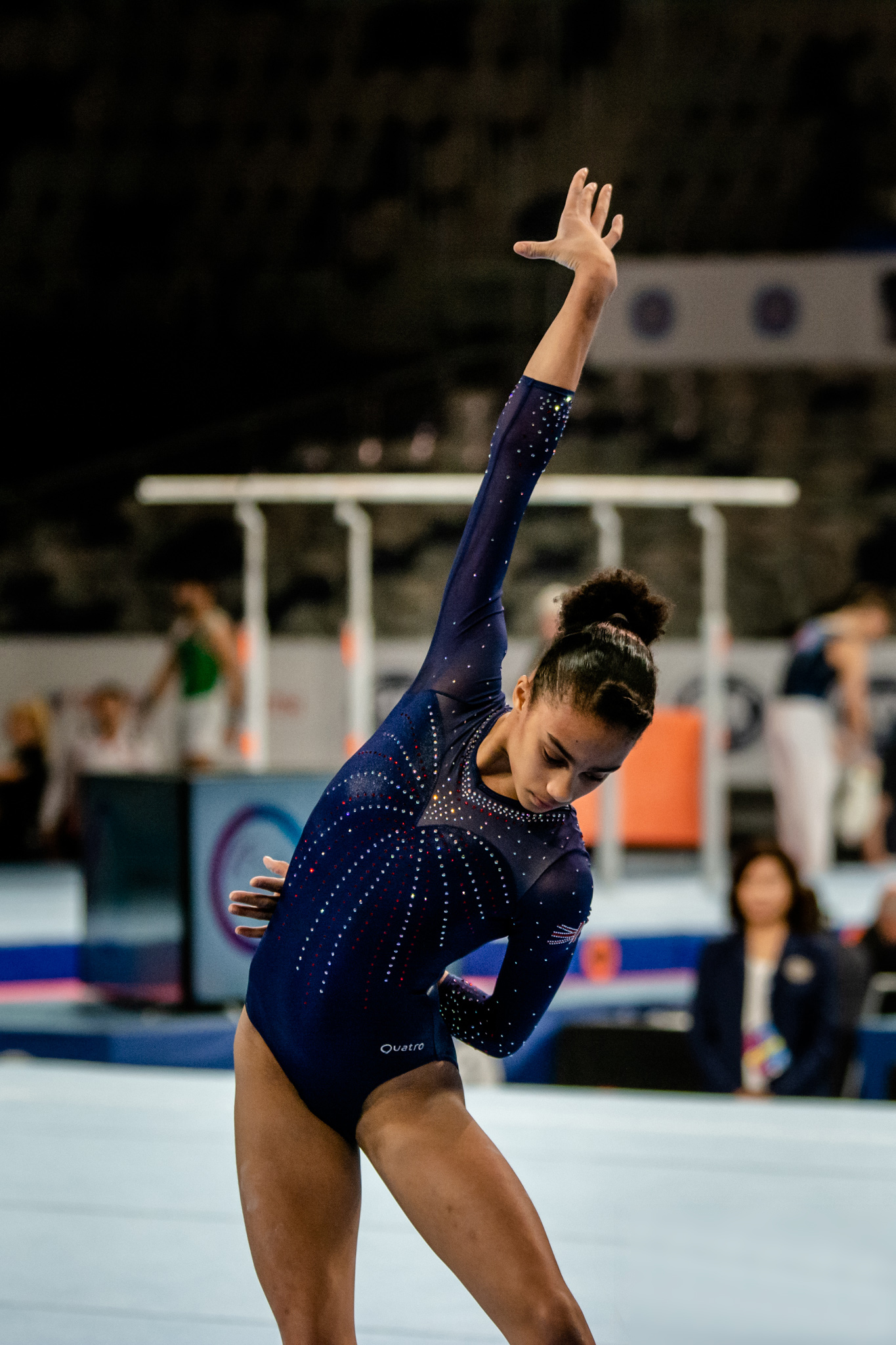
Ondine Achampong
11 x British medallist

Multi-time British Men's Medallist

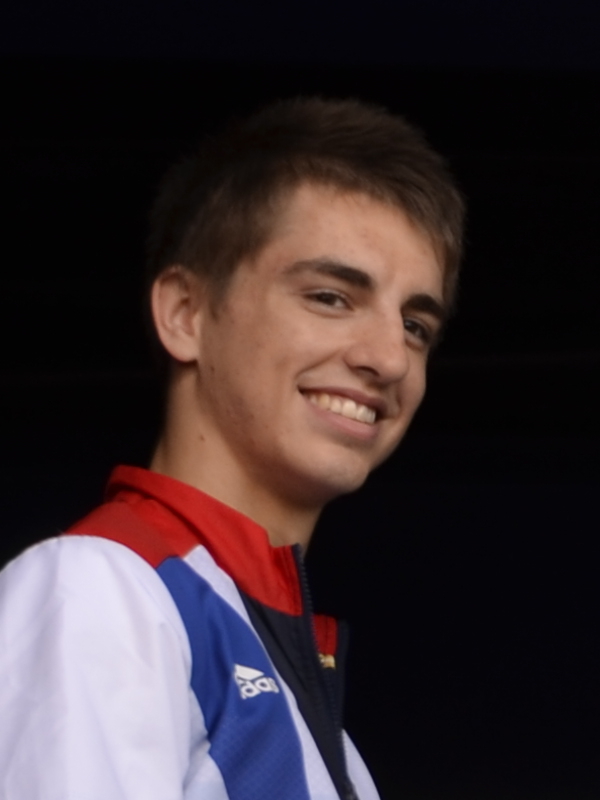
Max Whitlock
27 x British medallist

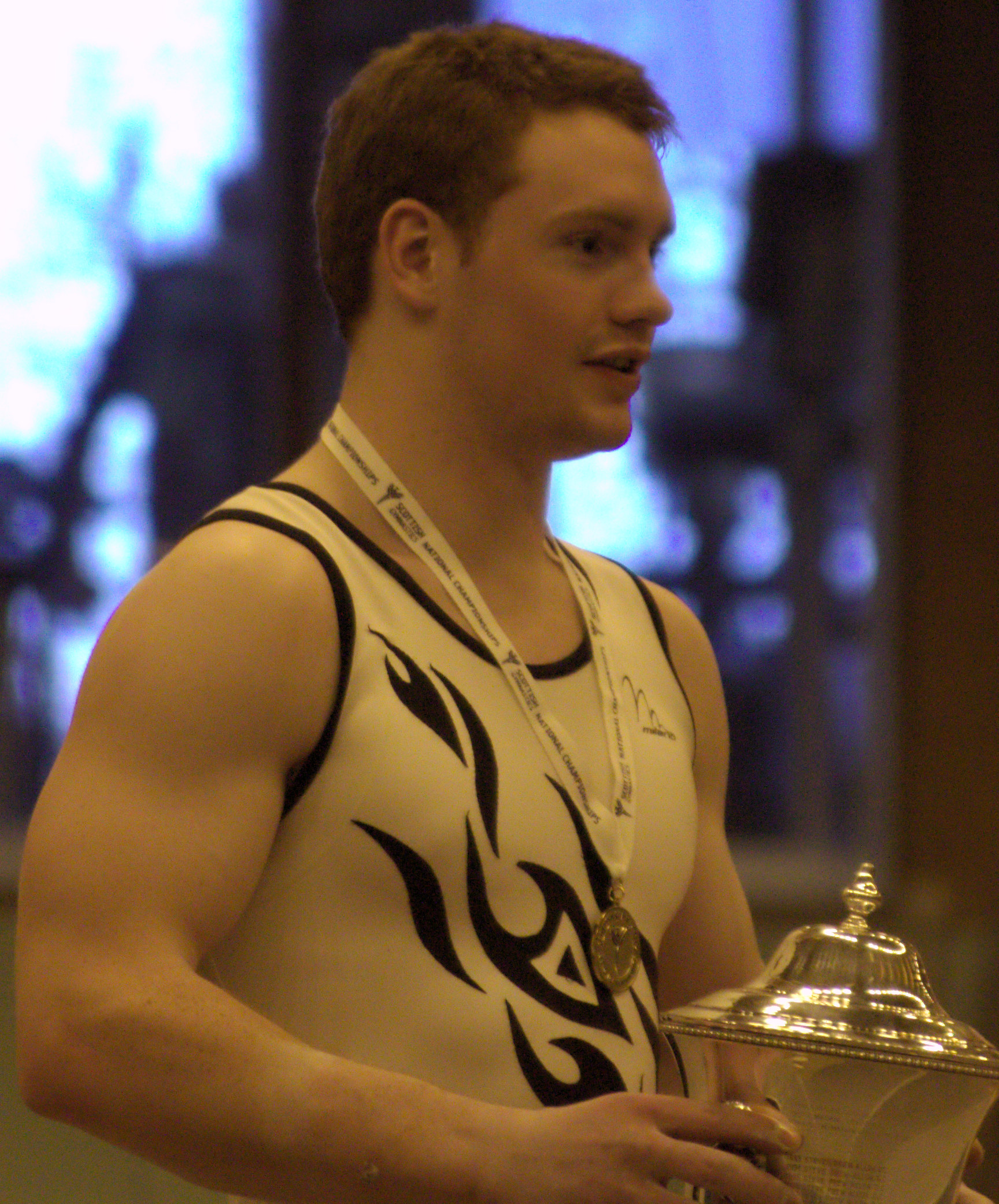
Daniel Purvis
30 x British medallist

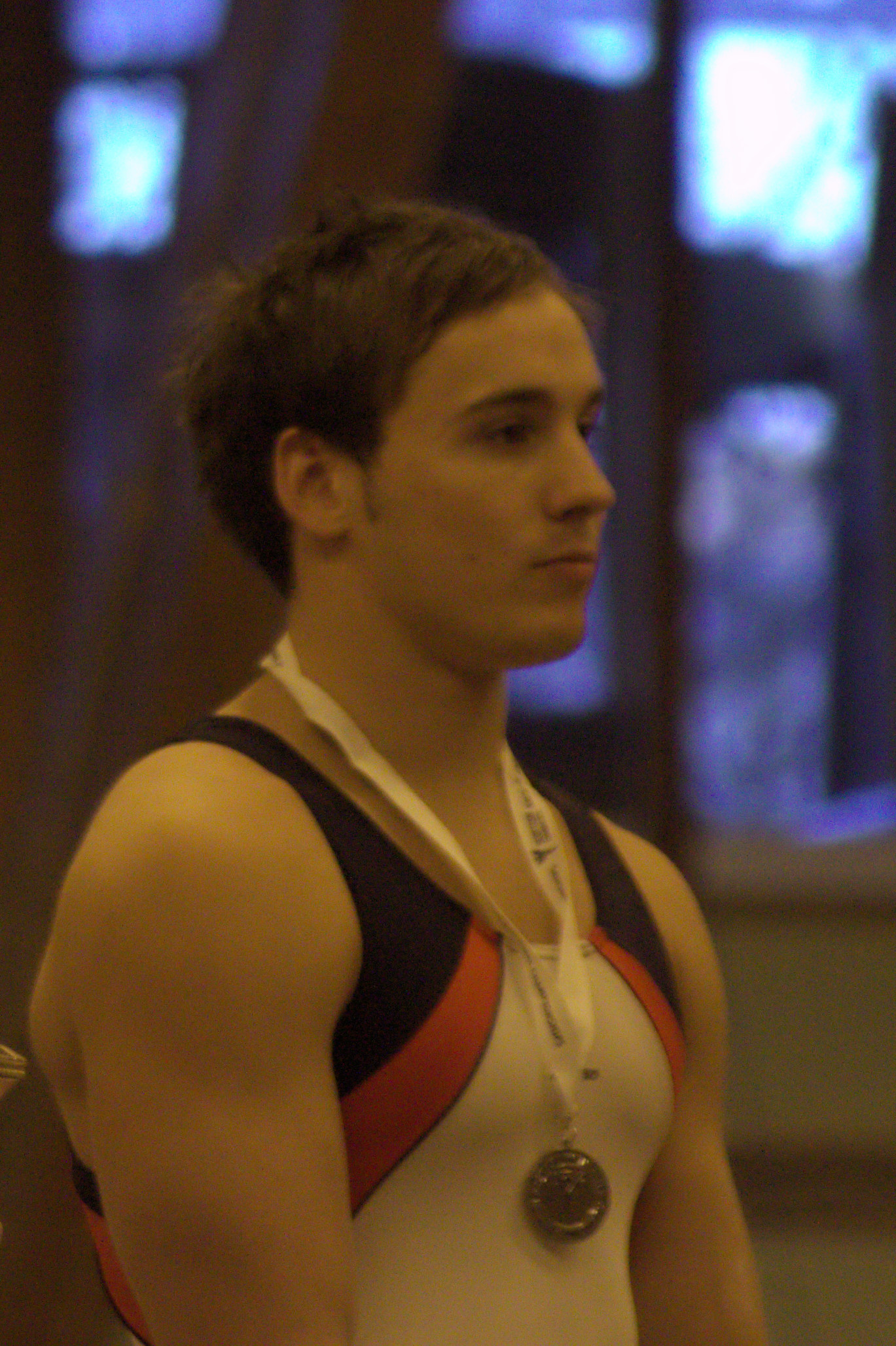
Dan Keatings
23 x British medallist

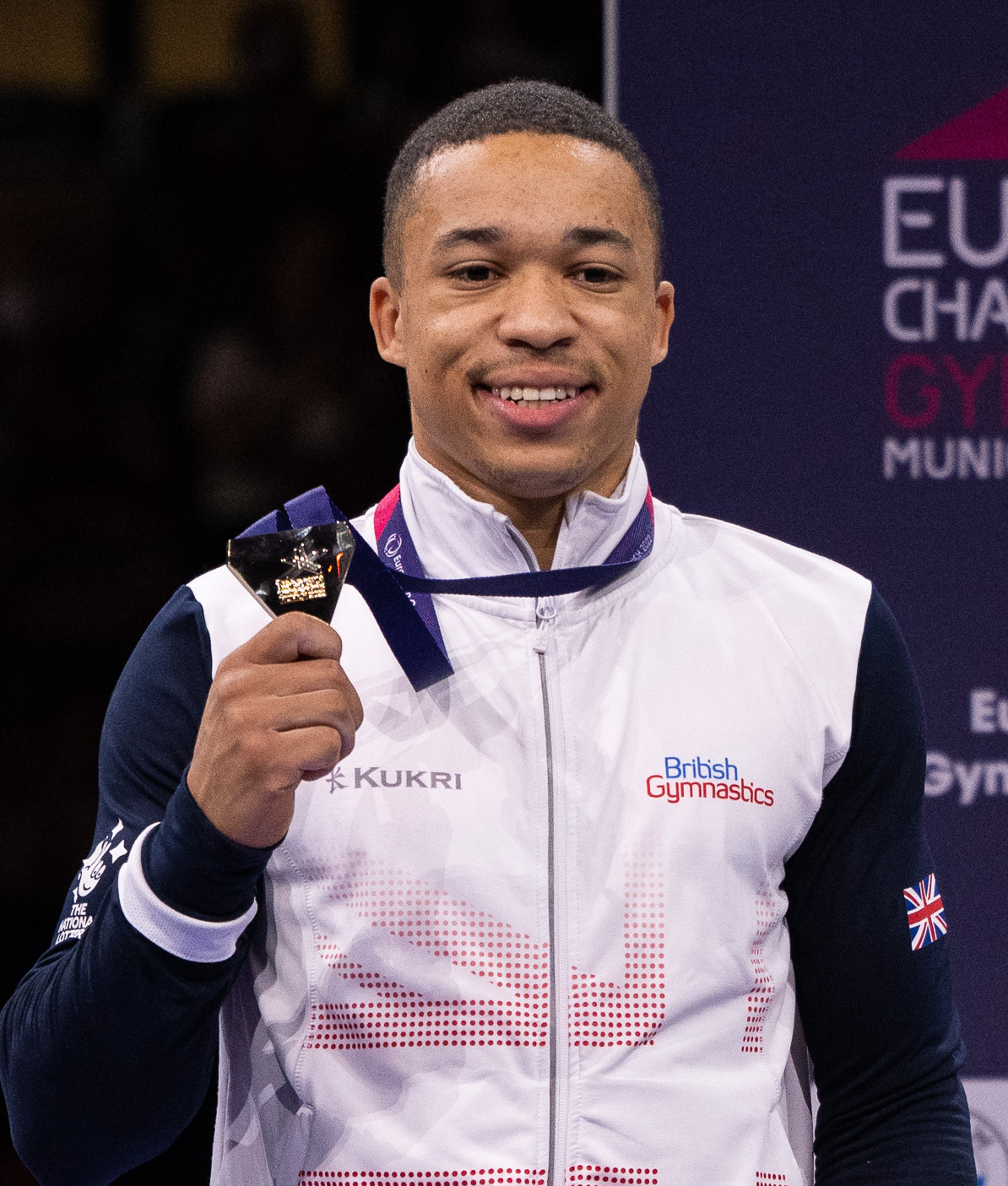
Joe Fraser
19 x British medallist

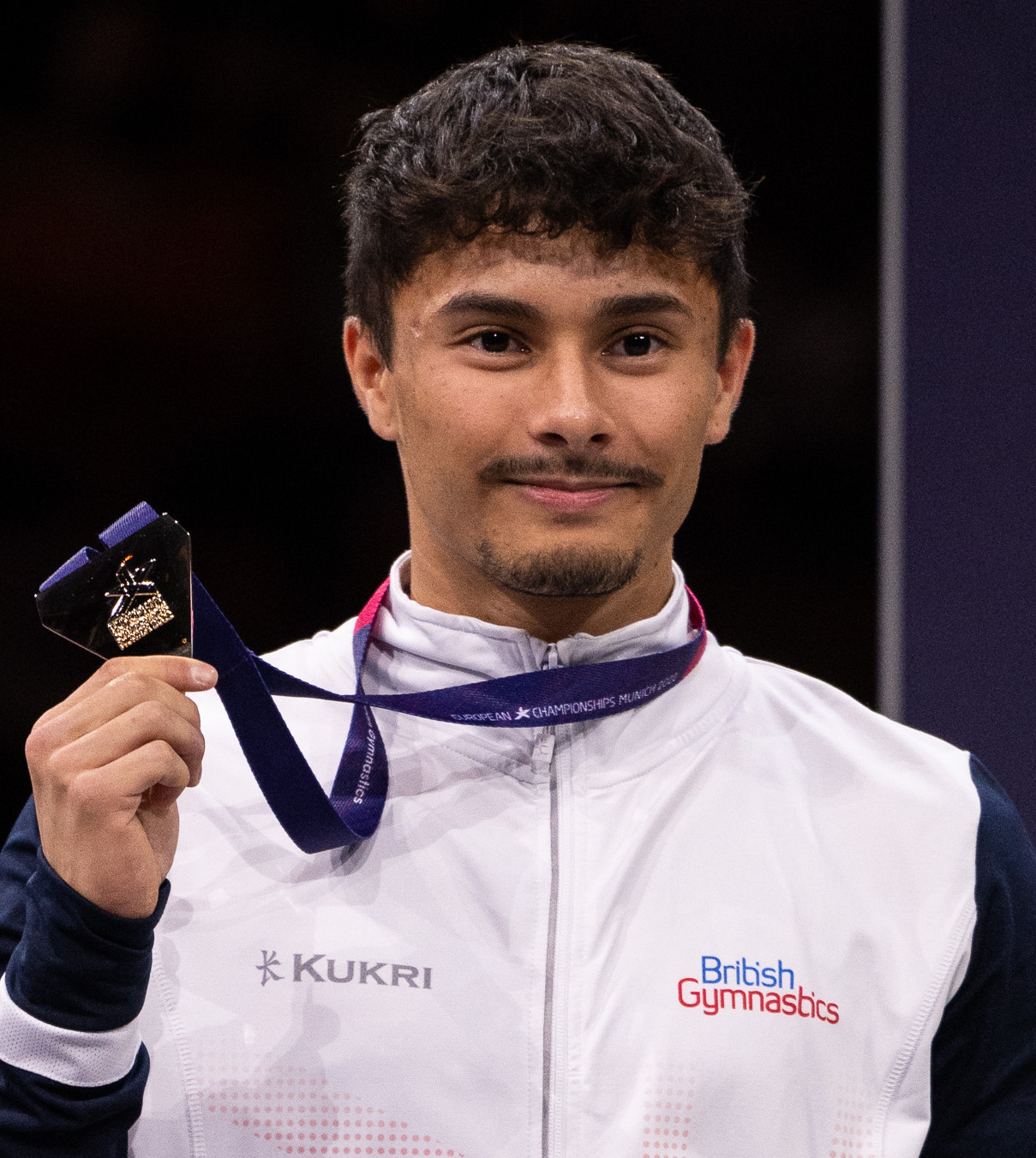
Jake Jarman
24 x British medallist

== See also ==
- Great Britain women's national artistic gymnastics team
- Great Britain men's national artistic gymnastics team
- British Gymnastics
