= Notts Gymnastics Academy =

Gymnastics club in Nottinghamshire, England

- Full name: Notts Gymnastics Academy
- Short name: NGA
- Sport: Artistic gymnastics
- Location: West Bridgford, Nottinghamshire
- Home ground: Rushcliffe Spencer Academy
- Colours
- Head coach: Jody Kime (WAG); Josh Champion (MAG)
- Members: Adam Tobin; Taeja James; Alexander Yolshin-Cash; Becky Downie (formerly); Elissa Downie (formerly); Sam Oldham (formerly)
- Website: www.nottsgymnasticsacademy.co.uk

Notts Gymnastics Academy is an artistic gymnastics club based at East Midlands Gymnastics Centre in West Bridgford, Nottinghamshire. It has produced British men's and women's national team members including Olympians, Sam Oldham and Becky & Ellie Downie.

The club formed in 1997 when Bigwood and Rushcliffe Gymnastics Club combined to share the newly built East Midlands Gymnastics Centre.

The clubs gym is at Rushcliffe Spencer Academy and flooded in 2023 during Storm Babet. The gym was redeveloped in 2024, with additional facilities added including new locker areas, reception and offices. A second phase of expansion is planned which includes knocking through the school’s old sports hall and squash courts, to create one of the biggest gymnastic facilities in the UK. Additional funding for the project was approved in March 2025.

== Notable gymnasts ==
The club has produced the following notable gymnasts:

=== WAG ===
- Becky Downie - 3 x Olympian, 2 x European Bars Champion and 2019 World uneven bars silver medallist.
- Ellie Downie - 2016 Summer Olympics, 2 x World medallist and 10 x European medallist.
- Taeja James - 2018 Commonwealth Games silver medallist
- Laura Jones - 2008 Summer Olympics
- Amy Dodsley - 2004 Summer Olympics
- Jordan Lipton - 2006 British Espoir Champion
- Emma Prest - Senior GB international
- Niamh Rippin - 2007 Espoir silver medallist 201, European team silver medallist

=== MAG ===
- Sam Oldham - 2012 Olympic bronze medallist and 3 x European medallist.
- Adam Tobin - 2023 European bronze medallist and 2023 British all-around champion.
- Alexander Yolshin-Cash - Represented Great Britain at the 2025 World Championships.

== Competitive history ==
Competitive history of Notts Gymnastics Academy in junior women's team competitions
Year	Competition	Team
2017	British Team Championships	1st place, gold medalist(s)
2023	British Team Championships	2nd place, silver medalist(s)
2025	British Team Championships	4

Competitive history of Notts Gymnastics Academy in senior women's team competitions
Year	Competition	Team
2013	British Team Championships	4
2018	British Team Championships	2nd place, silver medalist(s)
2022	British Team Championships	5
2025	British Team Championships	3rd place, bronze medalist(s)

Competitive history of Notts Gymnastics Academy in senior men's team competitions
Year	Competition	Team
2024	British Team Championships	1st place, gold medalist(s)
2025	British Team Championships	3rd place, bronze medalist(s)
