= Marissa King =

British artistic gymnast (born 1991)

- Full name: Marissa Petra King
- Nickname: Riss
- Born: 20 April 1991 (age 35) Cambridge, England
- Height: 154 cm (5 ft 1 in)

Gymnastics career
- Discipline: Women's artistic gymnastics
- Country represented: (United Kingdom) Great Britain; England
- College team: Florida Gators (2009-2013)
- Club: Huntingdon Gymnastics Club
- Head coach: Rhonda Faehn
- Assistant coaches: Adrian Burde, Robert Ladanyi
- Retired: 2013

Marissa Petra King (born 20 April 1991) is an English former artistic gymnast and current coach. She represented Great Britain at the 2008 Summer Olympics, as well as the 2007 and 2009 World Championships. After finishing her elite gymnastics career, she competed for the Florida Gators and became the 2011 NCAA champion on the vault. Since 2024, she has been an assistant coach for the Georgia GymDogs.

== Gymnastics career ==
King began gymnastics at the age of eight.

=== Elite career ===
King became age-eligible for senior elite international competitions in 2007. At the 2007 European Championships, she advanced into the vault final and finished sixth. She competed with the British team that finished seventh in the team final at the 2007 World Championships. After the World Championships, she finished fourth on the vault at the DTB Cup, only 0.025 points away from the bronze medal. She then won the vault gold medal at the Glasgow Grand Prix. In December 2007, she won a bronze medal on the vault at the Good Luck Beijing International Tournament, behind Cheng Fei and Hong Su-jong.

At the 2008 Maribor World Cup, King won the vault silver medal, behind Hong Un-jong. She then helped the British team place sixth at the 2008 European Championships. She placed sixth in the all-around at the British Championships and also won a silver medal on the vault. She was then selected to represent Great Britain at the 2008 Summer Olympics alongside Becky Downie, Beth Tweddle, Hannah Whelan, Rebecca Wing, and Laura Jones (later replaced by Imogen Cairns). The team finished ninth in the qualifications and did not advance into the final.

King competed on the vault and the floor exercise at the 2009 World Championships, but she did not advance into either final. In 2010, King began competing for the Florida Gators gymnastics team. At the 2010 NCAA Championships, she advanced into the vault and floor exercise finals, finishing fourth and fifth, respectively. She earned a total of four All-America honors during her freshman year.

King won a silver medal on the vault at the 2010 British Championships and was named to the 2010 Commonwealth Games team. However, she had to withdraw from the team due to a torn pectoral muscle. She won the vault title at the 2011 NCAA Championships. The next year, she helped Florida win the team SEC Championships and place second at the 2012 NCAA Championships. She returned to elite competition in 2012 in an attempt to qualify for the 2012 Summer Olympics, but she was not selected for the team. At the 2013 NCAA Championships, King helped Florida win its first-ever NCAA team title.

== Coaching career ==
King worked as a volunteer assistant coach for the Florida Gators in 2014. She worked as a choreographer and coach for club-level teams before being hired as a volunteer assistant coach for the Nebraska Cornhuskers. She was promoted to be Nebraska's assistant coach in 2024. She was then hired to be an assistant coach for the Georgia GymDogs.

== Personal life ==
King is the daughter of a British father and Thai mother She graduated from the University of Florida in August 2014 with bachelor's degrees in mass communications and geography. From 2014 until 2020, she was an artistic acrobat for Cirque du Soleil. She is married to fellow Georgia GymDogs assistant coach, Oleksii Koltakov, and they have one son.
