= Imogen Cairns =

British former artistic gymnast

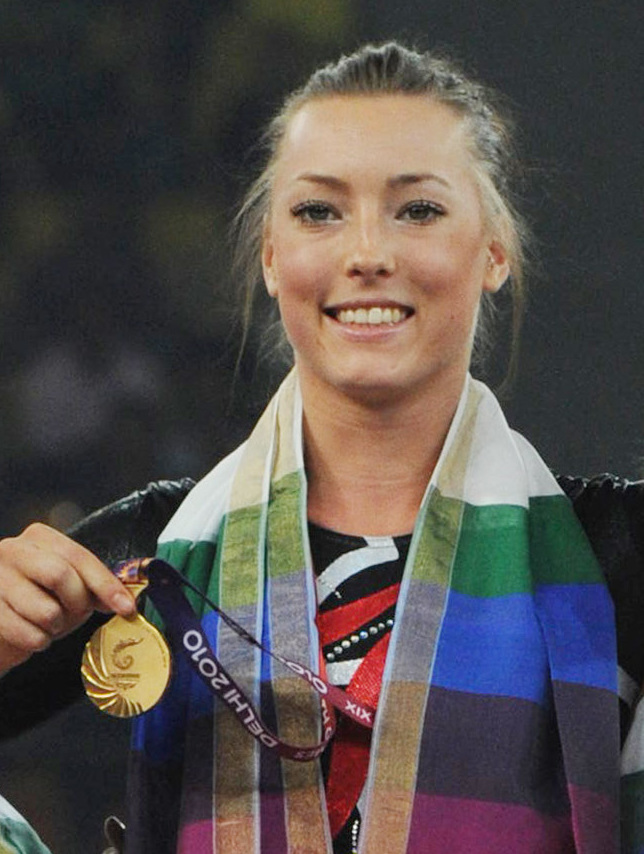
- Cairns at the 2010 Commonwealth Games

Personal information
- Full name: Imogen Jayne Cairns
- Born: 26 January 1989 (age 37) Southmead, Bristol, England
- Height: 156 cm (5 ft 1 in)

Gymnastics career
- Discipline: Women's artistic gymnastics
- Country represented: Great Britain; England
- Club: The Academy
- Head coach: Liz Kincaid
- Choreographer: Valorie Kondos Field
- Music: Alone by Delirium (2008–2011), Pulmon by Bajofondo (2012)
- Retired: October 2012
- World ranking: Vault 12 (2011)
Medal record
Representing England
Commonwealth Games
| Gold medal – first place | 2006 Melbourne | Vault |
| Gold medal – first place | 2010 Delhi | Vault |
| Gold medal – first place | 2010 Delhi | Floor Exercise |
| Silver medal – second place | 2006 Melbourne | Team |
| Silver medal – second place | 2010 Delhi | Team |

Imogen Jayne Cairns (born 26 January 1989) is a British former artistic gymnast who competed at the 2008 and 2012 Summer Olympics. Representing England, Cairns was a three-time Commonwealth Games champion in vault, twice, and in floor exercise.

== Senior career ==
=== 2006 ===
In March, Cairns competed for England at the 2006 Commonwealth Games in Melbourne, Australia. She contributed an all-around score of 54.800 towards the English team's second-place finish and won the vault final with a score of 14.325. The next month, she competed at the European Women's Artistic Gymnastics Championships in Volos, Greece. The British team placed seventh, and Cairns placed eighth on vault with a score of 13.850.

At the British Championships in Guildford, England, in July, Cairns placed fourth in the all-around with a score of 54.900. In event finals, she placed second on vault, scoring 13.450; third on uneven bars, scoring 13.500; fourth on balance beam, scoring 14.100; and second on floor exercise, scoring 14.250.

In November, Cairns placed fifth on vault at the Artistic Gymnastics World Cup event in Glasgow with a score of 14.012. In December, she placed seventh on vault, scoring 14.037, at the World Cup event in São Paulo, Brazil.

=== 2007 ===
Cairns broke her wrist in April 2007 and was in a cast for twelve weeks. After recovering from that injury, she broke her ankle. Her coach, Liz Kincaid, said, "Imogen was vaulting with a wrist support on and noticed during her hurdle step that the support had come undone. She tried to pull up and crashed into the vault and broke her ankle." These injuries caused Cairns to miss the 2007 World Artistic Gymnastics Championships.

=== 2008 ===
In April, Cairns placed fifth on vault at the World Cup event in Maribor, Slovenia, with a score of 13.775. After the event, she said, "I know internationally most people thought I had retired. Sorry, got me for a little while longer! Even in Great Britain, people thought I had finished. I find it hilarious."

At the British Championships in Guildford in June, Cairns placed fourth in the all-around with a score of 55.650. In event finals, she placed first on vault, scoring 14.200; second on balance beam, scoring 14.900; and first on floor, scoring 14.550. She was named as an alternate for the 2008 Summer Olympics, and made the team after Laura Jones was injured.

==== Beijing Olympics ====
Having stepped in to replace Jones, Cairns competed at the 2008 Olympics in Beijing alongside teammates Becky Downie, Marissa King, Beth Tweddle, Hannah Whelan, and Rebecca Wing. She helped the British team finish in ninth place and finished 33rd in the individual all-around with a score of 57.050.

After the Olympics, Cairns injured both her ankles while practising on vault. She said, "I rolled both my ankles—the bones weren't snapped, but everything else was. I was out for at least eighteen months with that injury. I had drilling of the bone, two operations on each ankle, and I couldn't walk properly for six months. Ever since, they've been good, but they will never be great. Every now and then they are too painful and I can't train. I have to have injections to numb my ankles, and I've been told I'll have arthritis in them by the time I'm 30."

=== 2009 ===
Cairns decided to return to training in 2009. She said, "I thought about quitting because I was out for so long. I put on a bit of weight and got my social life back and I thought, 'This is it.' But when your whole life has been gymnastics, you do miss it. I thought, 'I have nothing to lose if I try to come back.' It was just pure determination. I wanted to do it."

=== 2010 ===
At the British Championships in Guildford in July, Cairns placed fifth in the all-around with a score of 54.550. She won the vault final, scoring 14.000, and placed fourth on balance beam (13.200) and floor (13.650). She said about her return to gymnastics, "I thought that getting to the Olympics in 2008 would satisfy me, but having battled through injury, I just have something inside me that tells me I have much more to give. Having been through the highs of the Olympics and lows of injury, I can honestly say I now take things step by step. I learn from successes and setbacks, and put these to good use. I think I've matured, and I set myself personal goals."

At the beginning of October, Cairns competed for England at the 2010 Commonwealth Games in Delhi, India. She contributed an all-around score of 53.500 towards the English team's second-place finish. In the all-around final, she placed fourth with a score of 54.650. "One year ago, I didn't think I'd be able to train again," she said. "I think I was only just getting back to walking. Gymnastics just wasn't in the equation until my surgeon said that anything I did to my feet couldn't make them worse—so I decided to go for it again." In event finals, Cairns placed first on vault, scoring 13.775; eighth on balance beam, scoring 11.950; and first on floor, scoring 14.200. After the vault final, she said, "The gold today perhaps means more this time around, having been injured in both feet after the Beijing Olympics and being off for 15 months."

Later in October, Cairns competed at the 2010 World Artistic Gymnastics Championships in Rotterdam. She contributed a vault score of 14.633, a balance beam score of 11.833, and a floor score of 14.033 towards the British team's seventh-place finish, and placed eighth in the vault final with a score of 13.999.

In November, Cairns won the vault final at the World Cup event in Stuttgart, Germany, with a score of 13.937, and placed second on vault at the World Cup event in Glasgow with a score of 13.875.

=== 2011 ===
At the British Teams competition in Guildford in May, Cairns contributed scores of 12.900 on vault, 11.650 on balance beam, and 12.500 on floor toward The Academy's fifth-place finish. In July, she competed at the British Championships in Liverpool, placing first on vault (13.925) and third on balance beam (13.450).

At the 2011 World Artistic Gymnastics Championships in Tokyo in October, she contributed a vault score of 14.133 and a floor score of 13.700 towards the British team's fifth-place finish.

=== 2012 ===
In May, Cairns was set to compete at the 2012 European Championships but was replaced with teammate Ruby Harrold to allow Cairns more time to recuperate from minor injuries.

At the beginning of June, Cairns competed with gymnasts from Finland and Spain at a friendly meet in Ipswich, which also served as the second British Olympic trial. She placed fifth in the all-around with a score of 54.350 and third on floor with a score of 13.500. Later that month, she competed at the British Championships in Liverpool, the third and final Olympic trial. She placed fourth in the all-around with a score of 55.500. In event finals, she placed seventh on balance beam, scoring 12.450, and second on floor, scoring 14.100.

At the beginning of July, Cairns was selected to represent the United Kingdom at the 2012 Summer Olympics in London, along with Tweddle, Whelan, Jennifer Pinches and Rebecca Tunney.

==== London Olympics ====
At the Olympics, Cairns contributed scores of 14.266 on vault and 13.500 on balance beam towards the British team's sixth-place finish. Cairns retired from elite gymnastics soon after the 2012 Olympics.
