= Ellie Downie =

British artistic gymnast (born 1999)

Ellie Downie MBE
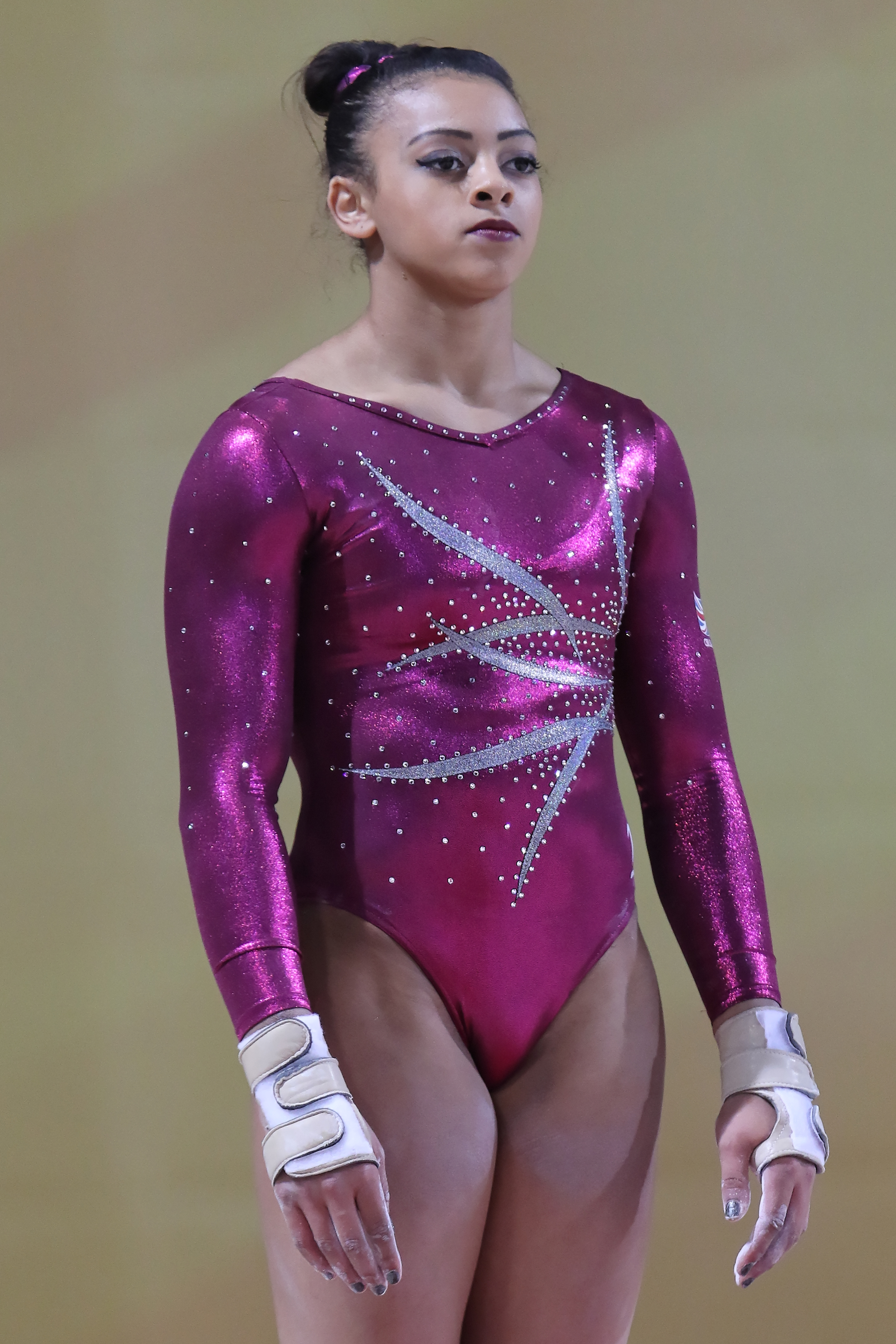
- Downie at the 2015 European Championships in Montpellier, France.

Personal information
- Full name: Elissa Rebecca Downie
- Born: 20 July 1999 (age 27) Nottingham, Nottinghamshire, England
- Height: 157 cm (5 ft 2 in)
- Relatives: Becky Downie (sister)

Gymnastics career
- Discipline: Women's artistic gymnastics
- Country represented: (United Kingdom) Great Britain; England (2012–2023)
- Club: Notts Gymnastics Academy
- Head coach: Jo Miller
- Retired: 23 January 2023
Medal record
Event	1st	2nd	3rd
World Championships	0	0	2
European Championships	1	6	3
Total	1	6	5
Representing Great Britain
World Championships
Bronze medal – third place	2015 Glasgow	Team
Bronze medal – third place	2019 Stuttgart	Vault
European Championships
Gold medal – first place	2017 Cluj-Napoca	All-Around
Silver medal – second place	2016 Bern	Team
Silver medal – second place	2016 Bern	Vault
Silver medal – second place	2016 Bern	Floor Exercise
Silver medal – second place	2017 Cluj-Napoc]	Vault
Silver medal – second place	2017 Cluj-Napoca	Floor Exercise
Silver medal – second place	2019 Szczecin	All-Around
Bronze medal – third place	2015 Montpellier	All-Around
Bronze medal – third place	2017 Cluj-Napoca	Uneven Bars
Bronze medal – third place	2019 Szczecin	Vault
Youth Olympic Games
Silver medal – second place	2014 Nanjing	Vault
Bronze medal – third place	2014 Nanjing	All-Around
Bronze medal – third place	2014 Nanjing	Balance Beam
Bronze medal – third place	2014 Nanjing	Floor Exercise
FIG World Cup
Event	1st	2nd	3rd
World Challenge Cup	4	0	0

Elissa Rebecca "Ellie" Downie MBE (born 20 July 1999) is a retired artistic gymnast who has represented Great Britain. She is the all-around 2017 European gymnastics champion, the first gymnast to win a major all-around title for Great Britain. (Note: Claudia Fragapane won the All-around competition in the 2014 Commonwealth Games, but representing England.)

The younger sister of triple European champion Becky Downie, Downie first came to prominence as an outstanding junior gymnast at the 2014 Summer Youth Olympics, winning four medals. At the age of 15, she became the first British woman to win an individual all-around medal at the European Artistic Gymnastics Championships, with a bronze in 2015. Later that year, she was part of the team that won Britain's first global team medal, a bronze, at the 2015 World Artistic Gymnastics Championships. At the 2017 European Championships, she made history again by becoming the first British gymnast to win the all-around at a major international competition.

On 23 January 2023, Downie announced her retirement from the sport.

== Junior career ==
Downie competed at the 2014 European Championships in Sofia, Bulgaria, and won a gold medal on vault, a silver medal with the British team and a bronze medal in the all-around. Based on this performance, she was selected to compete at the 2014 Summer Youth Olympics in Nanjing, China. There, she earned four medals: a silver on vault behind Wang Yan and bronzes in the all-around, balance beam and floor exercise.

== Senior career ==
=== 2015 ===
Downie made her senior debut at the 2015 British Championships. She won silver on vault and uneven bars and bronze in the all-around competition, and was named to the British team for the 2015 European Championships along with her sister, Becky Downie.

She performed well in qualifications at the European Championships, qualifying for the individual all-around, vault and uneven bars finals. On 17 April, she competed in the all-around final and placed third, behind Giulia Steingruber of Switzerland and Maria Kharenkova of Russia, with a score of 56.623, winning the first ever individual all-around medal for a British female gymnast at the European Championships.

Downie was the Sky Sports Sportswoman of the Month for April 2015. On 20 December, she was named the BBC Young Sports Personality of the Year.

=== 2016 ===
In May 2016, Downie won all four individual event titles at the FIG World Cup event in Osijek, Croatia, becoming the first gymnast to accomplish this feat at a World Cup competition since Ludmilla Tourischeva in 1975. The following month, at the 2016 European Championships in Bern, Switzerland, she won silver medals with the team and on vault and floor exercise.

In July, she was named to the British team for the 2016 Summer Olympics in Rio de Janeiro, along with Becky Downie, Claudia Fragapane, Ruby Harrold and Amy Tinkler.

==== Olympic Games ====
In qualifications at the Olympics, Downie landed on her head during a tumbling pass on floor and was unable to finish her routine. However, she returned in the next rotation, performing two vaults, and qualified to the all-around final in 20th place. She improved on that performance in the final, finishing 13th, and the British women finished fifth in the team competition.

=== 2017 ===
In April Downie represented Great Britain at the European Championships in Cluj-Napoca, Romania, where she made history by qualifying for all five individual finals. The next day, she became the first British gymnast to win the all-around title at a major international competition, beating Hungary's Zsófia Kovács and France's Mélanie de Jesus dos Santos. She also won silver medals on vault and floor exercise, and won the bronze medal on the uneven bars. At the beginning of August she underwent surgery on her ankle due to an injury she had dealt with at both the British Championships and European Championships that year. Due to the surgery Downie was unable to compete at the 2017 World Championships.

=== 2018 ===
While Downie had intended to compete at the 2018 Commonwealth Games, her ankle was still causing her issues despite the surgery she had undergone previously and she did not compete for a majority of the year.

On 27 September Downie was named to the team to compete at the World Championships in Doha, Qatar alongside Becky Downie, Alice Kinsella, Georgia-Mae Fenton, and Kelly Simm. The team finished ninth in qualifications and did not advance to the team final. Individually Downie qualified to the all-around final where she finished 11th.

=== 2019 ===
Downie was selected to compete at the 2019 European Championships alongside Amelie Morgan, Alice Kinsella, and Kelly Simm. She competed at the British Championships where she placed first in the all-around, on vault, and on floor exercise. She later competed at the Birmingham World Cup where she placed seventh after falling off the balance beam and uneven bars. At the European Championships Downie qualified to the all-around final in fourth place and to the vault final in first. In the all-around final Downie finished second behind Mélanie de Jesus dos Santos of France. She won bronze in the vault final behind 2015 vault champion Maria Paseka and 2017 vault champion Coline Devillard.

In September Downie was named to the team to compete at the 2019 World Championships in Stuttgart alongside Alice Kinsella, Becky Downie, Taeja James, and Georgia-Mae Fenton. During qualifications Downie helped Great Britain place seventh, earning a spot in the team final and qualifying a team for Great Britain to the 2020 Olympic Games in Tokyo. Individually Downie qualified for the vault final. During the team final she contributed scores on vault and uneven bars towards Great Britain's sixth-place finish. In the vault final Downie performed a Double-Twisting Yurchenko and a Cheng, earning an average score of 14.816 and winning the bronze medal behind Americans Simone Biles and Jade Carey. This was Downie's first individual World Championships medal. Later that day Downie's sister Becky won her first individual World Championships medal, a silver medal on the uneven bars.

=== 2020 ===
In early February it was announced that Downie was selected to represent Great Britain at the Birmingham World Cup taking place in late March. However the Birmingham World Cup was later canceled due to the COVID-19 pandemic in the United Kingdom.

=== 2021 ===
In May, British Gymnastics announced that Downie would be taking some time away from gymnastics to be with her family following the sudden death of her 24-year-old brother Joshua on the eve of the final Olympic trial, thus ending her Tokyo 2020 Olympic bid.

== Controversy ==
In 2021, both of the Downie sisters spoke out concerning the pressures placed onto competitors, including over-training when injured and weight-shaming. In 2023 interviews, Downie stated she had quit to focus on her "mental health and happiness", and also to coach junior athletes.

== Personal life ==
Downie is the sister of 3-time Olympian Becky Downie. She attended the Rushcliffe School in Nottingham until the summer of 2015.

== Honours ==
In April 2022, she and sister Becky received honorary degrees in sport from Nottingham Trent University.

Ellie and Becky Downie were both appointed Member of the Order of the British Empire (MBE) in the 2024 New Year Honours for services to gymnasts and the sport of gymnastics, which they received together from Princess Anne at Windsor Castle in early March.

== Competitive history ==
Competitive history of Ellie Downie at the junior level
Year	Event	Team	AA	VT	UB	BB	FX
2012	British Team Championships	3rd place, bronze medalist(s)	4	6	4	15	5
2012	British Espoir Championships		2nd place, silver medalist(s)	1st place, gold medalist(s)	1st place, gold medalist(s)	18	2nd place, silver medalist(s)
2012	UK School Games	1st place, gold medalist(s)	1st place, gold medalist(s)	1st place, gold medalist(s)	1st place, gold medalist(s)	1st place, gold medalist(s)	1st place, gold medalist(s)
2013	WOGA Classic	3rd place, bronze medalist(s)		2nd place, silver medalist(s)			
2013	Junior British Championships		3rd place, bronze medalist(s)	1st place, gold medalist(s)	2nd place, silver medalist(s)	2nd place, silver medalist(s)	
2013	British Team Championships	4					
2013	European Youth Olympic Festival	2nd place, silver medalist(s)	4	1st place, gold medalist(s)	7		
2013	Élite Gym Massilia	3rd place, bronze medalist(s)	12	3rd place, bronze medalist(s)	4		3rd place, bronze medalist(s)
2013	Gymnasiade	3rd place, bronze medalist(s)	6	4	3rd place, bronze medalist(s)		6
2014	English Championships		4	2nd place, silver medalist(s)		7	3rd place, bronze medalist(s)
2014	Munich Friendly	2nd place, silver medalist(s)	4				
2014	European Championships	2nd place, silver medalist(s)	3rd place, bronze medalist(s)	1st place, gold medalist(s)	5		
2014	Youth Olympic Games		3rd place, bronze medalist(s)	2nd place, silver medalist(s)		3rd place, bronze medalist(s)	3rd place, bronze medalist(s)

Competitive history of Ellie Downie at the senior level
Year	Event	Team	AA	VT	UB	BB	FX
2015	English Championships				9	2nd place, silver medalist(s)	6
2015	British Championships		3rd place, bronze medalist(s)	2nd place, silver medalist(s)	2nd place, silver medalist(s)	6	
2015	European Championships		3rd place, bronze medalist(s)	5	4		
2015	GBR-NED International Friendly	1st place, gold medalist(s)	1st place, gold medalist(s)				
2015	World Championships	3rd place, bronze medalist(s)		4			6
2016	British Championships		3rd place, bronze medalist(s)	1st place, gold medalist(s)		4	4
2016	Osijek Challenge Cup			1st place, gold medalist(s)	1st place, gold medalist(s)	1st place, gold medalist(s)	1st place, gold medalist(s)
2016	European Championships	2nd place, silver medalist(s)		2nd place, silver medalist(s)			2nd place, silver medalist(s)
2016	Olympic Games	5	13				
2017	British Championships		1st place, gold medalist(s)	1st place, gold medalist(s)	1st place, gold medalist(s)	WD	WD
2017	European Championships		1st place, gold medalist(s)	2nd place, silver medalist(s)	3rd place, bronze medalist(s)	4	2nd place, silver medalist(s)
2018
2018	World Championships	R1	11				
2019	British Championships		1st place, gold medalist(s)	1st place, gold medalist(s)		7	1st place, gold medalist(s)
2019	Birmingham World Cup		7				
2019	European Championships		2nd place, silver medalist(s)	3rd place, bronze medalist(s)			
2019	World Championships	6		3rd place, bronze medalist(s)			

== Floor music ==
Year	Music Title
2014	"Señorita" by Bond
2015	"Why Don't You" by Gramophonedzie
2016	"Skeletons" by Drehz
2017	"Boneless" by Steve Aoki
