= Gabrielle Jupp =

British artistic gymnast

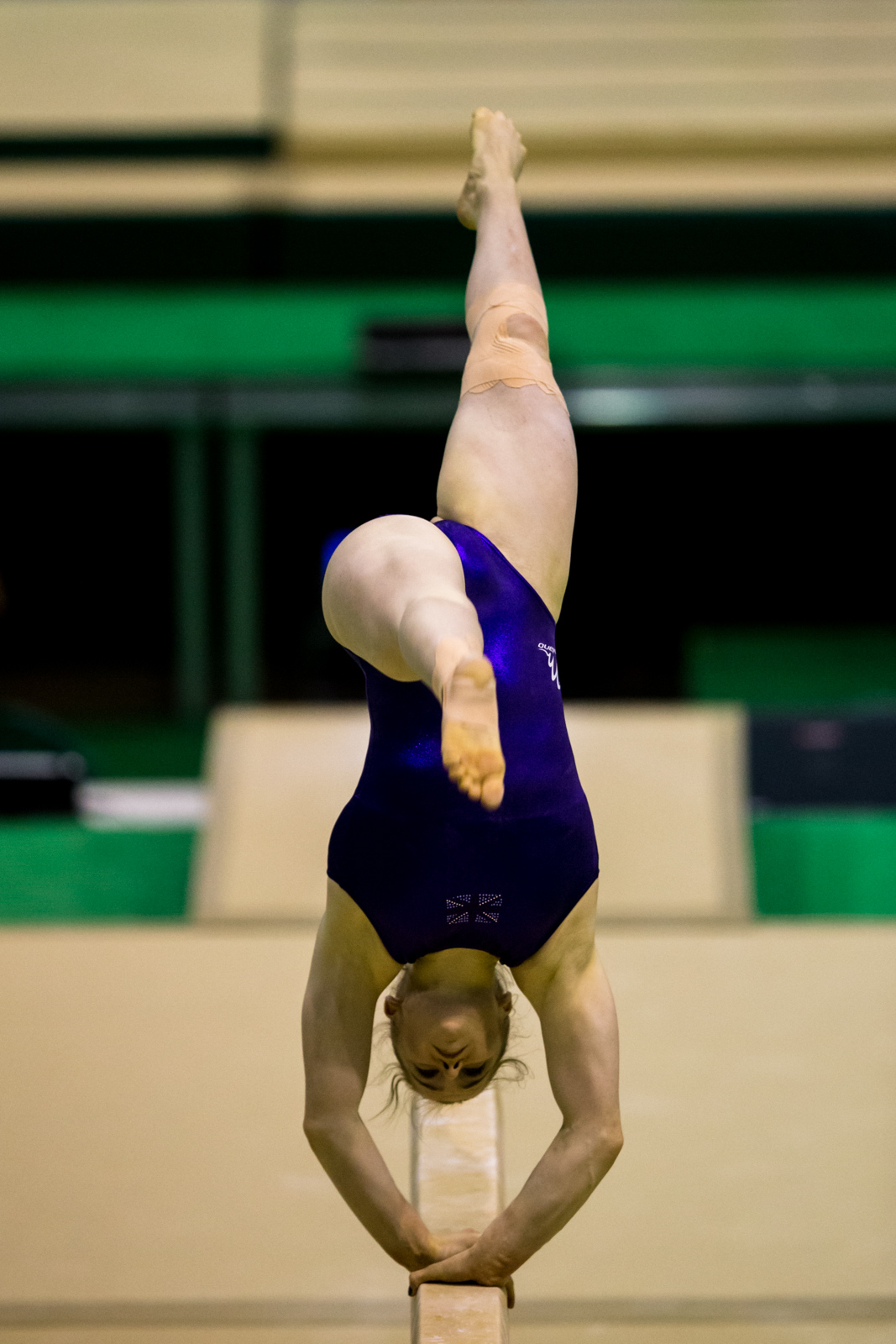
- Jupp performing a back handspring on beam at the 2016 Gymnastics Olympic Test Event

Personal information
- Full name: Gabrielle Jupp
- Nicknames: Gabs, Gabbers
- Born: 12 June 1997 (age 29) Barnet, United Kingdom

Gymnastics career
- Discipline: Women's artistic gymnastics
- Country represented: Great Britain; (2012–present)
- Club: Sapphire School of Gymnastics Limited
- Head coach: Steve Price
- Choreographer: Irena Kozyreva
- Music: "Taquito Militar" by Mariano Mores & Orchestra
- Retired: 23 November 2019
- World ranking: 19 (2014)
Medal record
Representing Great Britain
European Championships
Silver medal – second place	2016 Bern	Team

Gabrielle Jupp (born 12 June 1997) is a British former artistic gymnast. A successful junior gymnast, she was part of the Great Britain senior team that won silver in the team event at the 2016 European Women's Artistic Gymnastics Championships in Bern. A series of serious knee injuries curtailed her elite level career, and she announced her retirement in 2019, aged 22.

== Personal life ==
She trained at Sapphire School of Gymnastics Limited in Hemel Hempstead and is coached by Steve Price. Her best events are balance beam and floor exercise. Gabby Jupp was a torch bearer in the London 2012 Olympic torch relay where she ran with the Olympic flame through Harrow, London.

She attended Dame Alice Owen's School in Potters Bar, Hertfordshire and has 3 sisters, Jessica, Olivia and Bethany and a twin brother Luke.

== Junior career ==
Originally, Jupp trained at Hendon Gymnastics Club in North London. After a disappointing first year at the British Espoir Championships (2009) she changed clubs and began training at the Sapphire School of Gymnastics Limited. When she returned to the British Espoir Championships the following year (2010), she placed 2nd in the all-around, 1st on beam and 3rd on floor.

=== 2012 ===
2012 was a good year for Jupp. After placing 2nd in the all-around at the British National Championships two consecutive years in her respective age category (once as an Espoir and once as a Junior), she finally placed 1st, as the British Junior Champion (2012). In the same year she also took the English Junior title. Gabby was part of the British Junior team at the 2012 European Women's Artistic Gymnastics Championships in Brussels, Belgium that came 4th. She also won a Bronze medal on Floor and came 5th in the All-Around competition and 6th on Balance Beam. Too young to be considered for the London games, Jupp was given the opportunity to take part in an Olympic ambassador programme. This gave her the opportunity to watch the gymnastics live at The O2 Arena, alongside other events and enter the GB house.

== Senior career ==
=== 2013 ===
In March, Gabby made her debut to Senior international competition at the FIG World Cup in Worcester (The American Cup), USA where she placed 6th all-around, 2nd on beams, 5th on bars and floor and 8th on vault She went on to compete at the World Cup in Doha where she won Bronze on Balance Beam and the Uneven Bars.

At the British Championships, she became the Senior British All-Around Champion. She also won the British titles on Floor and Balance Beam, as well as a Silver on Uneven Bars behind 2008 Olympian, Becky Downie.

In April, she was chosen for the team competing at the 2013 European Artistic Gymnastics Championships in Moscow, Russia. During qualifiers she landed awkwardly from her Balance Beam dismount injuring her knee, and had to pull out of the competition. Her score qualified her for Balance Beam finals, despite the fall, but she had to return to the UK for medical assessment for her knee. The injury was later reported to be an ACL tear. Jupp had surgery in May and was out of competition for about a year. She told Hemel Today, "I kind of heard a snap but I didn't know how bad it was". She continued to say that she learnt a lot from her experience in Moscow and vowed to return to gymnastics when recovered.

=== 2014 & 2015 ===
Jupp returned to competition at the 2014 British Team Championships in September 2014 after tearing her ACL. She was chosen to join the team travelling to compete at the World Championships in Nanning, China with Becky Downie, Hannah Whelan, Claudia Fragapane, Ruby Harrold, Kelly Simm and Charlie Fellows. The British team qualified in 4th for the Team Final but finished 6th in the final itself. Jupp contributed to the team with scores on floor, uneven bars and balance beam.

Jupp was set to compete at the English Championships in March 2015 but unfortunately suffered another tear to her ACL in her right leg meaning she spent the rest of the year in recovery of her injuries.

=== 2016 ===
In April 2016, she participated at the 2016 British Artistic Gymnastics Championships; she won the bars title.

=== 2019 ===
In November 2019, Jupp announced that she had retired from Elite gymnastics in previous months due to consistent injuries.

== Competitive Highlights ==
Year	Event	Team	AA	VT	UB	BB	FX
2010	British Espoir Championships		2nd place, silver medalist(s)	6	5	1st place, gold medalist(s)	3rd place, bronze medalist(s)
2010	British Team Championships	6					
2010	UK School Games	1st place, gold medalist(s)	6		4	2nd place, silver medalist(s)	
2011	British Junior Championships		2nd place, silver medalist(s)	2nd place, silver medalist(s)	4	1st place, gold medalist(s)	2nd place, silver medalist(s)
2011	English Junior Championships		2nd place, silver medalist(s)	4	3rd place, bronze medalist(s)	2nd place, silver medalist(s)	2nd place, silver medalist(s)
2011	European Youth Olympic Festival		7			2nd place, silver medalist(s)	
2011	Junior International Gymnix	3rd place, bronze medalist(s)	5	2nd place, silver medalist(s)	8	1st place, gold medalist(s)	
2012	Junior British Championships		1st place, gold medalist(s)	3rd place, bronze medalist(s)	1st place, gold medalist(s)		
2012	Junior English Championships		1st place, gold medalist(s)	1st place, gold medalist(s)		1st place, gold medalist(s)	1st place, gold medalist(s)
2012	Junior European Championships	4	5			6	3rd place, bronze medalist(s)
2013	American Cup		6	8	5	2nd place, silver medalist(s)	5
2013	British Championships	1st place, gold medalist(s)			2nd place, silver medalist(s)	1st place, gold medalist(s)	1st place, gold medalist(s)
2013	Doha World Cup				3rd place, bronze medalist(s)	3rd place, bronze medalist(s)	4
2014	British Team Championships	3rd place, bronze medalist(s)					
2014	World Championships	6					
2015	did not compete						
2016	Welsh Championships				1st place, gold medalist(s)	1st place, gold medalist(s)	
2016	British Team Championships				2nd place, silver medalist(s)		
2016	British Championships				1st place, gold medalist(s)		
2016	Olympic Team Event				9		
2016	European Championships	2nd place, silver medalist(s)			7		
2017	did not compete						
2018	Toyota International				3rd place, bronze medalist(s)		
