= Mali Morgan =

Welsh artistic gymnast

- Full name: Mali Francesca Hershey Morgan
- Born: 11 October 2006 (age 19) Bridgend, Wales

Gymnastics career
- Discipline: Women's artistic gymnastics
- Country represented: Wales; Great Britain
- College team: Pittsburgh Panthers (2026-2029)
- Club: Clwb Cymru Caerdydd

Mali Morgan (born 11 October 2006) is a Welsh artistic gymnast. She represented Wales at the 2022 Commonwealth Games where the team placed fifth. Domestically she is the 2024 silver medallist on floor exercise at the British Championships.

In 2024 Morgan committed to the Pittsburgh Panthers gymnastics team.

== Junior gymnastics career ==
On beam Morgan is 2019 British champion as a junior and 2018 British silver medallist as an Espoir.

== Senior gymnastics career ==
=== 2022 ===
At the 2022 Welsh Championships Morgan won bronze in the all-around and gold on bars. Morgan placed 10th in the all-around and made the beam finals at the 2022 British Championships .

Morgan was selected to represent Wales at the 2022 Commonwealth Games alongside Poppy-Grace Stickler, where the team placed fifth.

=== 2023 ===
Morgan won bronze at the 2023 Welsh Championships and silver on bars and beam. At British Championships she placed eighth in the all-around and made the vault and floor finals.

=== 2024 ===
At Welsh Championships Morgan placed fifth in the all-around, winning silver on floor and bronze on vault. She won silver on floor exercise at the 2024 British Championships and placed sixth in the all-around competition as well as the beam and vault finals.

In 2024 Morgan committed to the Pittsburgh Panthers gymnastics team.

== Competitive history ==
Year	Event	Team	AA	VT	UB	BB	FX
Espoir
2017	Welsh Championships		6			1st place, gold medalist(s)	
2018	British Championships		5			2nd place, silver medalist(s)	
2019	Welsh Championships		9				
2019	British Team Championships					3rd place, bronze medalist(s)	
Junior
2021	British Championships		5			1st place, gold medalist(s)	
Senior
2022	Welsh Championships		3rd place, bronze medalist(s)		7	1st place, gold medalist(s)	
2022	British Championships		10			6	
2022	Commonwealth Games	5					
2023	British Championships		5				
2023	British Team Championships	1st place, gold medalist(s)	5				
2024	Welsh Championships		5		3rd place, bronze medalist(s)		2nd place, silver medalist(s)
2024	English Championships (guest)			3rd place, bronze medalist(s)			
2024	British Championships		6	6		6	2nd place, silver medalist(s)
