= Jamie Lewis (gymnast) =

British artistic gymnast

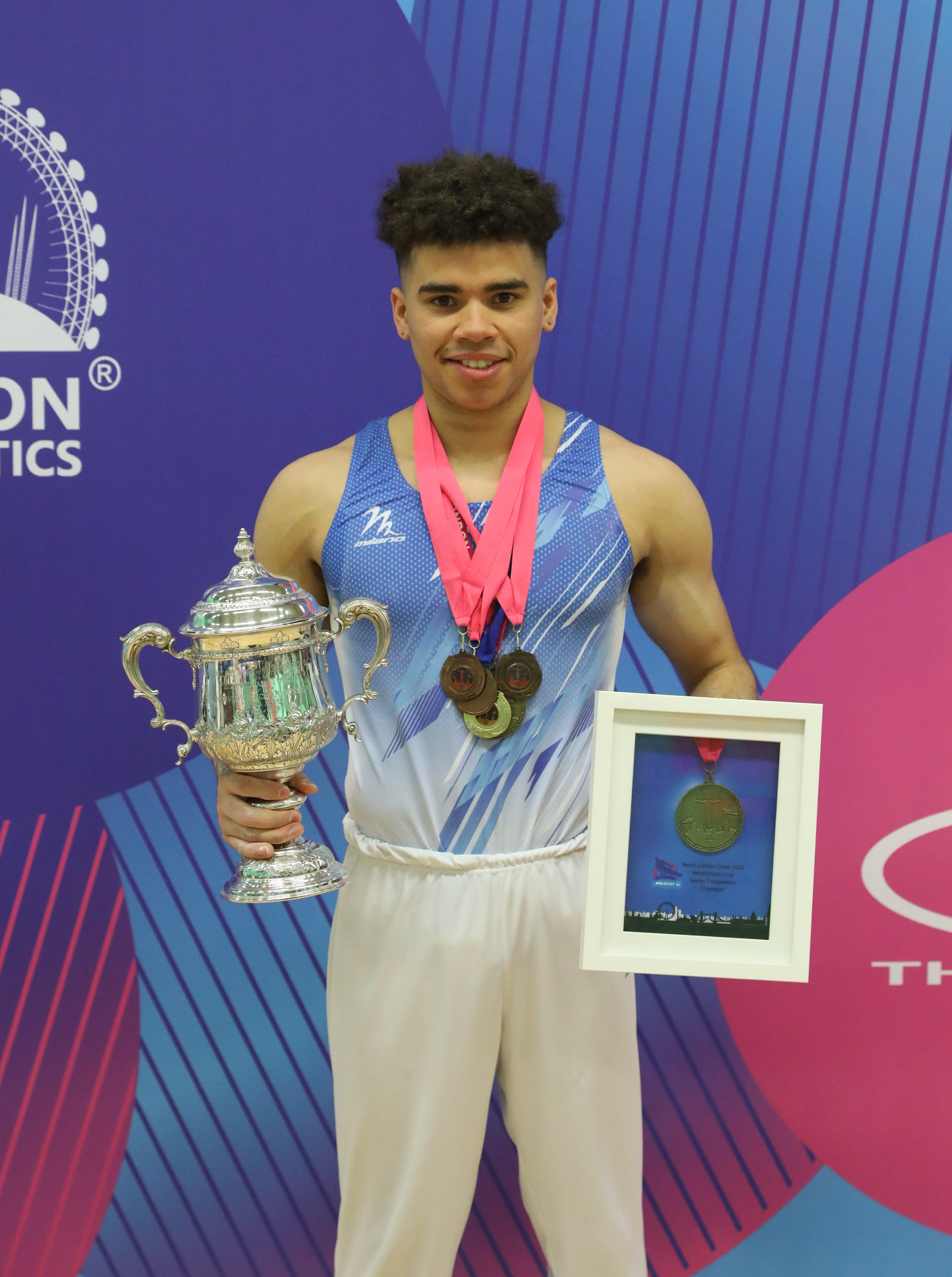
- Lewis in May 2023

Personal information
- Full name: Jamie Lewis
- Born: 2000 (age 25–26) Guildford, England

Gymnastics career
- Discipline: Men's artistic gymnastics
- Country represented: (United Kingdom) Great Britain; England (2019–present)
- Club: Woking Gymnastics Club
- Head coach: Simon Elliott
Medal record
Men's artistic gymnastics
Representing Great Britain
Gold medal – first place	2025 Leipzig	Team

Jamie Lewis (born 2000) is a British artistic gymnast and member of the British national team. He won gold with the Great Britain team at the 2025 European Artistic Gymnastics Championships.

He is a six-time Junior European medallist, including a team gold in 2016 as well as team and all-around silver and floor exercise gold in 2018.

== Gymnastics career ==
=== 2016 ===
Lewis attended the 2016 Junior European Championships alongside Joe Fraser, Joshua Nathan, Giarnni Regini-Moran and Donell Osbourne and helped the team win gold. He also qualified for the floor final where he placed fifth.

=== 2018 ===
Lewis was selected to represent Great Britain at the 2018 Junior European Championships alongside Jake Jarman, Adam Tobin, Pavel Karnejenko and Donnell Osborne where he competed in the all-around and helped the team take the silver medal. Individually, he also won silver in the all-around and on pommel horse, gold on floor exercise and bronze on still rings.

=== 2018 ===
He attended the Cottbus World Cup but did not qualify for the pommel horse final.

=== 2019 ===
At the 2019 British Championships Lewis won all-around and floor bronze as well as silver on still rings. At the Birmingham World Cup he placed ninth in the all-around. He then competed at the Koper Challenge Cup where he qualified for the pommel horse final and placed fourth. This was followed by the Paris Challenge Cup where Lewis competed on pommel horse and still rings but did not qualify for the final.

=== 2023 and 2024 ===
At the British Championships, Lewis won silver on pommel horse. He then competed pommel horse, still rings, parallel bars and horizontal bars at the Osijek Challenge Cup where he qualified for the pommel horse final where he placed fourth.

Lewis missed the 2024 season due to a wrist injury.

=== 2025 ===
At the British Championships, Lewis took the all-around, floor and high bar titles as well as bronze on pommel horse. Lewis was selected to attend the 2025 European Championships, his first major senior championships, alongside Harry Hepworth, Jake Jarman, Jonas Rushworth and Luke Whitehouse. He helped Britain win their third ever European men's team title. Individually Lewis qualified to the all-around final where he placed 9th.

== Competitive history ==
Competitive history of Jamie Lewis
Year	Event	Team	AA	FX	PH	SR	VT	PB	HB
2016
2016	Junior European Championships	1st place, gold medalist(s)		5					
2018
2018	Junior European Championships	2nd place, silver medalist(s)	2nd place, silver medalist(s)	1st place, gold medalist(s)	2nd place, silver medalist(s)	3rd place, bronze medalist(s)			
2018	Cottbus World Cup				26				
2019	British Championships		3rd place, bronze medalist(s)	3rd place, bronze medalist(s)		2nd place, silver medalist(s)			
2019	Birmingham World Cup		9						
2019	Koper Challenge Cup				4				
2019	Paris Challenge Cup				26	22			
2023	British Championships				2nd place, silver medalist(s)				
2023	Osijek Challenge Cup				4				
2025	British Championships	1st place, gold medalist(s)		1st place, gold medalist(s)	3rd place, bronze medalist(s)				1st place, gold medalist(s)
2025	Osijek World Cup				15	12		17	15
2025	European Championships	1st place, gold medalist(s)	9						
