= Ruslan Panteleymonov =

British artistic gymnast (1983–2022)

- Full name: Ruslan Panteleymonov
- Born: 2 August 1983 Kharkiv, Ukraine
- Died: 2 September 2022 (aged 39) London, England
- Height: 1.66 m (5 ft 5 in)

Gymnastics career
- Discipline: Men's artistic gymnastics
- Country represented: (United Kingdom) Great Britain; England
- Former countries represented: Ukraine
Medal record
Men's artistic gymnastics
Representing Great Britain
European Championships
Gold medal – first place	2012 Montpellier	Team

Ruslan Panteleymonov (2 August 1983 – 23 August 2022) was a Ukrainian-born artistic gymnast representing Great Britain and England internationally, and an international diving coach after retirement. He was part of the Great Britain team to win gold at the 2012 European Championships, and was reserve for the bronze medal-winning Great Britain team at the 2012 Summer Olympics.

== Early life ==
Born in Kharkiv, Ukraine, Panteleymonov spent his childhood in Ukrainian gymnastics. With his coach Alex Shyryayev, he was part of the Ukrainian squad. He moved to England in 2001 to join his coach, who was by then coaching at Hinckley Gymnastics Club in England. Ruslan also worked part-time as a coach and gained UK citizenship some years later, which allowed him to transfer allegiance and compete for Great Britain.

== Gymnastics career ==
He excelled in the Great Britain team that won the nation's first ever team gold at the 2012 European Championships in Montpellier. Panteleymonov’s 16.1 vault score, in particular, moved Britain into first place ahead of Russia, in what turned out to be a crucial turning point in the competition. Ruslan was travelling reserve for the London Olympic Games.

After retirement, Panteleymonov joined British Swimming as a coach for the diving team. He worked with British divers in the build-up to their record-breaking performances at the 2016 Olympic Games in Rio de Janeiro and the 2020 Olympic Games in Tokyo, as well as World Championship and European Championship campaigns.

== Death ==
Panteleymonov died on 23 August 2022. He was 39 years old, survived by a wife and a son.
