= 2016 British Artistic Gymnastics Championships =

British Artistic Gymnastics Competition held in 2016

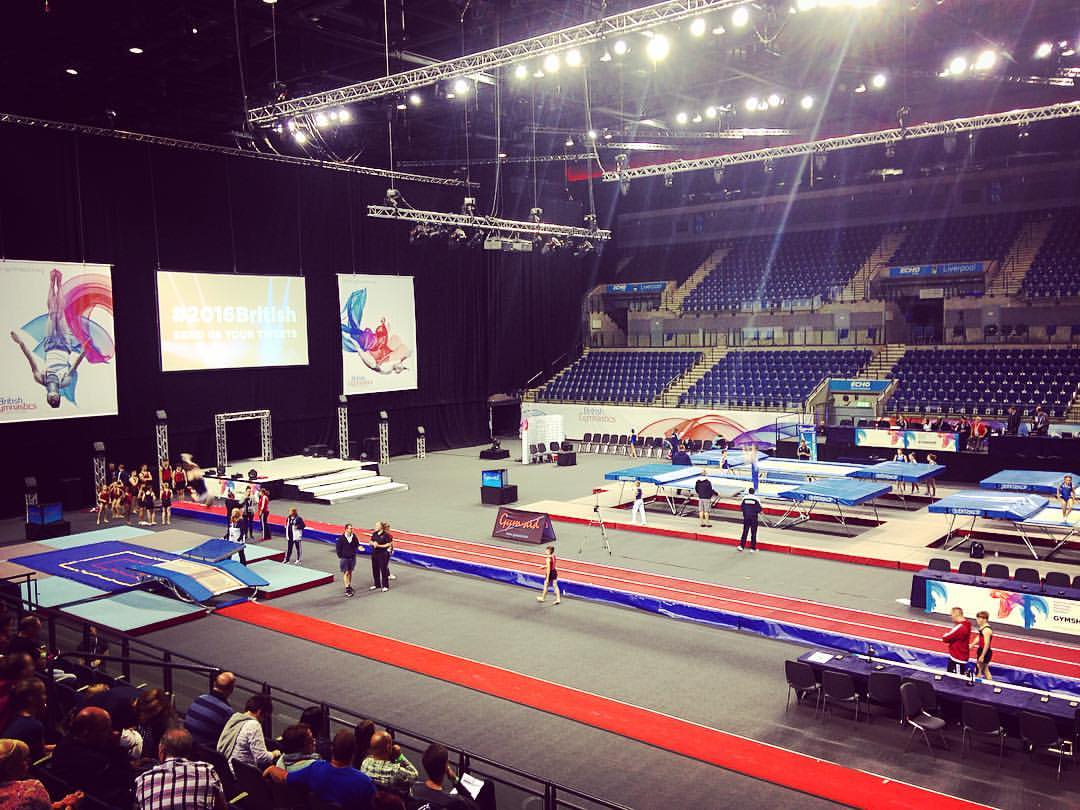
- Venue: Echo Arena (capacity: 12,000)
- Location: Liverpool, England
- Dates: 8–10 April 2016
- Competitors: TBD

The 2016 British Artistic Gymnastics Championships were held on 8–10 April 2016 at the Echo Arena, Liverpool, Merseyside.

== Background ==
The 2016 event marked the sixth time the championships were held at the Echo Arena in Liverpool, and an Indoor Arena for that matter.

== Television coverage ==
On 29 January 2016 British Gymnastics announced that the BBC would air the final day of competition.
