= Theo Seager =

English gymnast (born 1990)

- Born: 15 January 1990 (age 36) Oldham, England

Gymnastics career
- Discipline: Men's artistic gymnastics
- Country represented: (United Kingdom) Great Britain

Theo Seager (born 15 January 1990) is an English gymnast. He comes from Manchester and his club is Bury GC. He is coached by Paul Hockwart.

He represented Great Britain at the Gymnastics World Championships at Rotterdam in 2010, helping the team to come 7th.
