= David Eaton (gymnast) =

Welsh artistic gymnast (born 1980)

- Full name: David Lloyd Eaton
- Born: 28 September 1980 (age 45)
- Height: 176 cm (5 ft 9 in)

Gymnastics career
- Discipline: Men's artistic gymnastics
- Country represented: (United Kingdom) Great Britain; Wales
- College team: California Golden Bears (2001–2004)
Medal record
Commonwealth Games
| Silver medal – second place | 2006 Melbourne | Horizontal bar |

David Lloyd Eaton (born 28 September 1980) is a Welsh artistic gymnast who won a silver medal for Wales at the 2006 Commonwealth Games.
