= Niamh Rippin =

British artistic gymnast

- Full name: Niamh Nicole Rippin
- Born: 30 March 1994 (age 32) Nottingham, United Kingdom
- Height: 1.46 m (4 ft 9 in)

Gymnastics career
- Discipline: Women's artistic gymnastics
- Country represented: United Kingdom
- Club: Notts Gymnastics Club
- Head coach: Claire Starkey
- Assistant coach: Ian Kime
Medal record
European Championships
Silver medal – second place	2010 Birmingham	Team

Niamh Rippin (born 30 March 1994) is a British former artistic gymnast and was a reserve athlete for the 2012 Summer Olympics team.

== Senior career ==
=== 2010 ===
In April Rippin competed at the Artistic Gymnastics World Cup event in Paris, France. She placed eighth on vault with a score of 12.700 and fourth on floor with a score of 13.225.

In May, Rippin competed at the 2010 European Women's Artistic Gymnastics Championships in Birmingham, United Kingdom. She contributed a balance beam score of 13.100 and a floor score of 14.350 towards the British team's second-place finish. Rippin placed sixth in the floor final with a score of 13.400.

In July, Rippin competed at the British Championships in Guildford, United Kingdom. She placed sixth in the all around with a score of 53.550. In event finals, she placed seventh on vault scoring 12.900 and second on floor scoring 14.200.

=== 2011 ===
In July, Rippin competed at the British Championships in Liverpool, United Kingdom. She placed seventh in the all around with a score of 50.300. In event finals, she placed third on vault scoring 13.475 and second on floor scoring 14.250.

=== 2012 ===
In March, Rippin competed at the English Championships in Kent, United Kingdom. She placed third in the all around with a score of 53.600.

At the beginning of June, Rippin competed at an international friendly with gymnasts from Finland and Spain in Ipswich, United Kingdom which was also the second Olympic trial. She placed fourth in the all around with a score of 54.550. In event finals, she placed third on vault scoring 14.300 and sixth on balance beam scoring 12.300.

At the end of June, Rippin competed at the British Championships in Liverpool, United Kingdom. This is the third and final Olympic Trial to decide the gymnasts that will represent the United Kingdom at the Olympics. She placed fifth in the all around with a score of 55.050. In event finals, she placed first on vault scoring 14.150 and first on floor scoring 14.250.
