= Taeja James =

English artistic gymnast (born 2002)

- Full name: Taeja Nicole James
- Born: 15 October 2002 (age 23) Nottingham, England

Gymnastics career
- Discipline: Women's artistic gymnastics
- Country represented: (United Kingdom) Great Britain England
- Club: Notts Gymnastics Academy; City of Birmingham (formerly)
- Head coaches: Jodie Kime, Lee Woolls
Medal record
Women's artistic gymnastics
Representing Great Britain
FIG World Cup
Event / 1st / 2nd / 3rd; World Challenge Cup / 0 / 2 / 0
Representing England
Commonwealth Games
Silver medal – second place	2018 Gold Coast	Team

Taeja Nicole James (born 15 October 2002) is an English artistic gymnast. She won a silver medal in the team event at the 2018 Commonwealth Games and competed at the 2018 European Championships and the 2019 World Championships. As a junior she won a silver medal with the British team at the 2016 Junior European Championships.

== Junior gymnastics career ==
=== 2016 ===
James won the silver medal in the junior all-around at the 2016 British Championships. She then competed at the 2016 Junior European Championships and helped the British team win the silver medal behind Russia. At the 2016 Elite Gym Massilia, she won the silver medal on the floor exercise behind Anastasia Ilyankova.

=== 2017 ===
James won the junior all-around title at the 2017 British Championships despite falling off the beam. She then finished fifth in the all-around at the 2017 European Youth Olympic Festival.

== Senior gymnastics career ==
=== 2018 ===
James became age-eligible for senior competitions in 2018. She won the vault bronze medal and the floor exercise silver medal at the 2018 British Championships. At 15 years and 6 months old, James was the youngest athlete representing England at the 2018 Commonwealth Games. She was not originally selected for the team but was brought in to replace the injured Amy Tinkler. While there, she helped England win the team silver medal. She qualified for the floor exercise final in first place, but she stepped out of bounds twice in the final and finished seventh. She then competed with the British team that finished fourth at the 2018 European Championships.

=== 2019 ===
James finished eighth in the all-around at the 2019 British Championships. In the event finals, she won a bronze medal on the floor exercise and finished fifth on the balance beam. She helped Great Britain finish sixth at the 2019 World Championships.

=== 2025 ===
After a 5-year break from gymnastics, James teased her return on Instagram. She trialled for the 2025 World Championships, where she was named as a non-travelling reserve. She made her return to competition at the 2025 British Team Championships, where Notts Gymnastics Academy came second and individually James placed third on vault, second on balance beam and fourth on floor. In November James broke her Talus bone in her foot and was required to take time out.

=== 2026 ===
James made her return to British Championships where she competed on balance beam and floor exercise. She qualified for the balance beam final where she placed 8th. James competed at the Koper Challenge Cup where she won silver on vault and floor exercise. In June, Leat was announced as part of the English team at the 2026 Commonwealth Games, alongside Abigail Martin, Alia Leat, Ruby Stacey and Shantae-Eve Amankwaah.

== Competition history ==
Competitive history of Taeja James at the junior level
Year	Event	Team	AA	VT	UB	BB	FX
2014	English Championships		7				
2016	International Gymnix	7	26				
2016	British Team Championships		6				
2016	English Championships		2nd place, silver medalist(s)	1st place, gold medalist(s)	1st place, gold medalist(s)	2nd place, silver medalist(s)	
2016	British Championships		2nd place, silver medalist(s)	4	7	6	3rd place, bronze medalist(s)
2016	Züri Gym Days	1st place, gold medalist(s)	1st place, gold medalist(s)	3rd place, bronze medalist(s)	2nd place, silver medalist(s)		
2016	Italian Junior Friendly	1st place, gold medalist(s)	6				
2016	European Championships	2nd place, silver medalist(s)					
2016	Olympic Hopes Cup		7	5		3rd place, bronze medalist(s)	
2016	Elite Gym Massilia		8		5		2nd place, silver medalist(s)
2017	British Championships		1st place, gold medalist(s)	1st place, gold medalist(s)	1st place, gold medalist(s)	2nd place, silver medalist(s)	1st place, gold medalist(s)
2017	English Championships		1st place, gold medalist(s)				
2017	European Youth Olympic Festival	5	5				
2017	British Team Championships		1st place, gold medalist(s)	1st place, gold medalist(s)	3rd place, bronze medalist(s)	1st place, gold medalist(s)	1st place, gold medalist(s)

Competitive history of Taeja James at the senior level
Year	Event	Team	AA	VT	UB	BB	FX
2018	English Championships		8				
2018	British Championships		16	3rd place, bronze medalist(s)			2nd place, silver medalist(s)
2018	Doha World Cup						6
2018	Commonwealth Games	2nd place, silver medalist(s)					7
2018	European Championships	4					
2018	British Team Championships		20				1st place, gold medalist(s)
2019	British Championships		8			5	3rd place, bronze medalist(s)
2019	British Team Championships	4	6	3rd place, bronze medalist(s)		3rd place, bronze medalist(s)	1st place, gold medalist(s)
2019	World Championships	6					
2025	British Team Championships	3rd place, bronze medalist(s)		3rd place, bronze medalist(s)		2nd place, silver medalist(s)	4
2026	British Championships					8	
2026	Koper World Challenge Cup			2nd place, silver medalist(s)			2nd place, silver medalist(s)
