= Laura Jones (gymnast) =

British artistic gymnast (born 1992)

- Full name: Laura Victoria Jones
- Born: 12 June 1992 (age 34) Nottingham
- Height: 161 cm (5 ft 3 in)

Gymnastics career
- Discipline: Women's artistic gymnastics
- Country represented: United Kingdom
- Club: Notts

Laura Victoria Jones (born 12 June 1992 in Nottingham, England) is a British gymnast selected for the Great Britain team at the 2008 Summer Olympic Games but had to drop out due to injury, to be replaced by Imogen Cairns.

Jones achievements include:

- 2006: placed 3rd in the all-around at the Junior British championships
- 2006: placed 4th on beam at the Junior European Championships
- First British gymnast to compete a punch front half
- Only British gymnast to currently compete a triple twist dismount
