= Rebecca Wing =

British artistic gymnast (born 1992)

- Full name: Rebecca Jayne Wing
- Nickname: Becky
- Born: 15 July 1992 (age 34) Frimley, Surrey, England
- Height: 164 cm (5 ft 5 in)

Gymnastics career
- Discipline: Women's artistic gymnastics
- Country represented: Great Britain; England
- College team: Stanford (2012-2016)
- Club: Heathrow Gymnastics Club
- Head coach: Vincent + Michele Walduck
- Assistant coach: Natalia Ilienko-Jarvis
Medal record
Women's artistic gymnastics
Representing England
Commonwealth Games
Silver medal – second place	2010 Delhi	Team all-around

Rebecca Jayne Wing (born 15 July 1992) is a British artistic gymnast from Farnborough, Hampshire. She was a member of the British 2008 Summer Olympics artistic gymnastics team and a member of the British team that came 6th at the 2007 World Championships in Stuttgart. She studied at Cove Secondary School and Farnborough Sixth Form College where she achieved straight A grades in her A Levels of Maths, Psychology, Biology and PE. After originally obtaining a place at the University of Exeter, Wing decided to take a gap year before obtaining a scholarship to Stanford University to compete for their NCAA gymnastics team as Class of 2015.
