= Artistic gymnastics at the 2026 Commonwealth Games – Women's individual all-around =

Women's individual all-around at the 2026 Commonwealth Games
- Venue: SEC Hydro, Glasgow
- Dates: 25 July 2026 (qualification); 26 July 2026 (final)
- Competitors: 18 from 10 nations
- Winning score: 53.050

Medalists
gold medal	Ellie Black	Canada
silver medal	Breanna Scott	Australia
bronze medal	Lia-Monica Fontaine	Canada

The Women's individual all-around gymnastics competition at the 2026 Commonwealth Games in Glasgow, Scotland was held on 26 July 2026 at the SEC Hydro, Glasgow. Canadian veteran Ellie Black became the first gymnast, male or female, to win a Commonwealth Games individual all-around title for a second time, eight years after her first title.

== Schedule ==
The schedule was as follows:

All times are British Summer Time (UTC+1)

Date	Round
Saturday 25 July 2026	Qualification
Sunday 26 July 2026	Final

== Results ==
=== Qualification ===
Qualification for this all-around final was determined in parallel with the team final. Qualification took place on 25 July 2026.

The results are as follows:

Position	Gymnast	country	Vault (gymnastics)	Uneven bars	Balance beam	Floor (gymnastics)	Total	Notes
1	Ellie Black	Canada	13.950	13.850	12.900	12.700	53.400	Q
2	Ruby Evans	Wales	14.050	13.300	12.550	12.900	52.800	Q
3	Breanna Scott	Australia	12.850	13.150	13.600	12.750	52.350	Q
4	Georgia Godwin	Australia	13.550	12.800	12.900	12.850	52.100	Q
5	Lia-Monica Fontaine	Canada	13.800	12.200	12.850	13.200	52.050	Q
6	Lia Redick	Canada	13.500	12.650	12.700	13.000	51.850	NR
7	Abigail Martin	England	13.550	12.800	11.800	13.250	51.400	Q
8	Shantae-Eve Amankwaah	England	12.700	13.500	12.150	13.050	51.400	Q
9	Alia Leat	England	13.400	12.450	12.800	12.150	50.800	NR
10	Amanda Yap	Singapore	12.700	11.900	12.950	12.500	50.050	Q
11	Emily Roper	Wales	13.100	13.600	11.100	11.800	49.600	Q
12	Naveen Daries	South Africa	12.800	12.050	12.350	10.950	48.150	Q
13	Crystelle Lake	Scotland	13.050	11.700	11.250	12.100	48.100	Q
14	Caitlin Rooskrantz	South Africa	12.300	12.450	11.350	11.600	47.700	Q
15	Courtney McGregor	New Zealand	12.950	11.700	11.500	11.150	47.300	Q
16	Kang Xian Yeap	Malaysia	12.700	11.350	12.500	10.450	47.000	Q
17	Zelmé Daries	South Africa	11.500	11.850	11.700	11.800	46.850	NR
18	Cadence Zi Qi Teh	Malaysia	11.750	12.350	10.850	11.800	46.750	Q
19	Ellee Cheetham	Scotland	12.700	11.500	11.250	11.250	46.700	Q
20	Philippa Busuttil	Malta	11.650	10.250	12.850	11.150	45.900	Q
21	Alena Tan	Singapore	12.000	10.200	10.750	11.900	44.850	Q
22	Sophie St. John	Malta	12.350	10.850	11.650	9.700	44.550	R1
23	Lottie Smith	Scotland	11.900	11.150	10.900	10.600	44.550	NR
24	Ava MacFarlane	Scotland	10.300	11.550	11.100	11.500	44.450	NR
25	Karma Visagie	South Africa	11.550	11.650	11.350	9.650	44.200	NR
26	Georgia Charalampous	Cyprus	11.450	11.200	10.200	11.150	44.000	R2
27	Protistha Samanta	India	12.950	8.500	10.050	10.750	42.250	R3
28	Eshitaa Rewale	India	11.750	9.550	10.050	10.350	41.700	
29	Sienna Santiago	Cayman Islands	11.250	9.100	9.900	11.250	41.500	
30	Emma Yap	Singapore	11.850	7.500	9.900	12.200	41.450	
31	Dailia Burke	Trinidad and Tobago	11.900	9.400	8.600	10.450	40.350	
32	Lyana Curmi Inguanez	Malta	12.000	8.450	9.100	10.750	40.300	
33	Tyesha Humphries	Namibia	11.450	7.800	9.850	10.650	39.750	
34	Nishka Agarwal	India	11.450	9.350	9.000	8.750	38.550	
35	Nuyara Fernando	Sri Lanka	10.600	9.750	8.600	9.350	38.300	
36	Anne-Leen Thorburn	Namibia	11.550	7.850	7.900	10.550	37.850	
37	Sureshni Andrew	Namibia	11.050	6.850	6.800	9.800	34.500	
38	Jonie Thorburn	Namibia	10.500	6.250	6.900	9.850	33.500	

=== Final ===
The all-around final took place on the evening of 26 July 2026. The results of the final are as follows:

Position	Gymnast	Country	Vault (gymnastics)	Uneven bars	Balance beam	Floor (gymnastics)	Total
1st place, gold medalist(s)	Ellie Black	Canada	13.850	13.250	13.200	12.750	53.050
2nd place, silver medalist(s)	Breanna Scott	Australia	13.100	13.100	13.900	12.800	52.900
3rd place, bronze medalist(s)	Lia-Monica Fontaine	Canada	14.300	13.100	12.250	13.150	52.800
4	Shantae-Eve Amankwaah	England	12.950	13.350	12.200	13.050	51.550
5	Georgia Godwin	Australia	12.900	12.850	12.500	12.700	50.950
6	Ruby Evans	Wales	14.100	12.850	10.950	12.950	50.850
7	Emily Roper	Wales	13.300	13.300	12.550	11.200	50.350
8	Kang Xian Yeap	Malaysia	12.900	12.250	12.650	11.900	49.700
9	Crystelle Lake	Scotland	13.100	13.250	12.350	10.700	49.400
10	Naveen Daries	South Africa	12.800	12.600	12.300	11.400	49.100
11	Abigail Martin	England	13.600	10.950	11.650	12.600	48.800
12	Cadence Zi Qi Teh	Malaysia	12.000	11.550	12.950	11.800	48.300
13	Zelme Daries	South Africa	12.700	12.600	10.750	12.200	48.250
14	Amanda Yap	Singapore	13.000	11.450	11.950	10.900	47.300
15	Courtney McGregor	New Zealand	13.350	10.800	11.650	11.350	47.150
16	Alena Tan	Singapore	12.500	11.000	11.700	11.700	46.900
17	Ellee Cheetham	Scotland	13.050	11.700	10.700	10.550	46.000
18	Philippa Busuttil	Malta	11.600	9.750	9.650	10.450	41.450
