= Artistic gymnastics at the 2026 Commonwealth Games – Women's floor =

Women's floor at the 2026 Commonwealth Games
- Venue: OVO Hydro
- Dates: 25 July 2026 (qualification); 28 July 2026 (final)
- Competitors: 8 from 5 nations
- Winning score: 13.500

Medalists
gold medal	Ruby Evans	Wales
silver medal	Abigail Martin	England
bronze medal	Shantae-Eve Amankwaah	England

The Women's floor gymnastics competition at the 2026 Commonwealth Games in Glasgow, Scotland was held on 27 July 2026 at OVO Hydro.

== Schedule ==
The schedule was as follows:

All times are British Summer Time (UTC+1)

Date	Time	Round
Saturday 25 July 2026	09:09	Qualification
Tuesday 28 July 2026	15:38	Final

== Results ==
=== Qualification ===
Qualification for this apparatus final was determined within the team final.

The results are as follows:

Rank	Gymnast	Difficulty	Execution	Penalty	Total	Notes
1	Abigail Martin (ENG)	5.800	7.450		13.250	Q
2	Lia-Monica Fontaine (CAN)	5.700	7.500		13.200	Q
3	Shantae-Eve Amankwaah (ENG)	5.200	7.850		13.050	Q
4	Lia Redick (CAN)	5.400	7.600		13.000	Q
5	Ruby Evans (WAL)	5.400	7.800	0.3	12.900	Q
6	Georgia Godwin (AUS)	5.300	7.550		12.850	Q
7	Kate McDonald (AUS)	4.900	7.900		12.800	Q
8	Breanna Scott (AUS)	5.000	7.750		12.750	–
9	Ellie Black (CAN)	5.400	7.400	0.1	12.700	–
10	Emily Whitehead (AUS)	4.700	7.800		12.500	–
11	Amanda Yap (SGP)	4.900	7.600		12.500	Q
12	Jemima Taylor (WAL)	4.900	7.450		12.350	R1
13	Shanna-Kae Grant (ENG)	5.000	7.300		12.300	–
14	Emma Yap (SGP)	4.900	7.300		12.200	R2
15	Alia Leat (ENG)	5.300	6.950	0.1	12.150	–
16	Crystelle Lake (SCO)	5.100	7.100	0.1	12.100	R3

=== Final ===
The results are as follows:

Rank	Gymnast	Country	Difficulty	Execution	Penalty	Total
1st place, gold medalist(s)	Ruby Evans	Wales	5.500	8.000		13.500
2nd place, silver medalist(s)	Abigail Martin	England	5.800	7.533		13.333
3rd place, bronze medalist(s)	Shantae-Eve Amankwaah	England	5.200	8.100		13.300
4	Lia Redick	Canada	5.400	7.833		13.233
5	Lia-Monica Fontaine	Canada	5.700	7.400		13.100
6	Kate McDonald	Australia	5.100	7.833		12.933
7	Georgia Godwin	Australia	5.200	7.500	-0.400	12.300
8	Amanda Yap	Singapore	4.500	6.500		11.000
