= Artistic gymnastics at the 2026 Commonwealth Games =

- Artistic gymnastics pictogram
- Venue: The Arena, Glasgow
- Dates: 24 – 28 July 2026
- Competitors: 116 from 22 nations

Artistic gymnastics at the 2026 Commonwealth Games was the 11th appearance of Gymnastics at the Commonwealth Games. The artistic gymnastics competition at the 2026 Commonwealth Games took place in Glasgow, Scotland, from 24 to 28 July 2026. The sport made its eleventh appearance since its 1978 debut, spread across fourteen events.

== Schedule ==
Artistic gymnastics is the sole discipline contested. The competition schedule was as follows:

Q	Qualification	F	Final

Artistic
Date Event	Fri 24	Sat 25	Sun 26	Mon 27	Tue 28
Men's team all-around	F				
Men's individual all-around	Q		F		
Men's floor	Q			F	
Men's pommel horse	Q			F	
Men's rings	Q			F	
Men's vault	Q				F
Men's parallel bars	Q				F
Men's horizontal bar	Q				F
Women's team all-around		F			
Women's individual all-around		Q	F		
Women's vault		Q		F	
Women's uneven bars		Q		F	
Women's balance beam		Q			F
Women's floor		Q			F

== Venue ==
The artistic gymnastics competitions were held at Emirates Arena, Glasgow, the same venue that hosted the 2014 Commonwealth Games.

== Medal summary ==
=== Medal table ===
* Host nation (Scotland)

Rank	CGA	Gold	Silver	Bronze	Total
1	Canada	7	5	4	16
2	Australia	4	1	4	9
3	England	1	4	2	7
4	Scotland*	1	1	1	3
5	Wales	1	0	2	3
6	Cyprus	0	2	1	3
7	Singapore	0	1	0	1
Totals (7 entries)		14	14	14	42

=== Men's events ===
Event	Gold	Silver	Bronze
Team all-around	Canada; Jordan Carroll; René Cournoyer; Félix Dolci; William Émard; Ethan Ikeda	England; Gabriel Langton; Joshua Nathan; Adam Tobin; Luke Whitehouse; Alexander Yolshin-Cash	Australia; Benjamin Foster; Tru Hagens; James Hardy; Ritam Malik; Jesse Moore
Individual all-around	Reuben Ward; Scotland	Félix Dolci; Canada	Jesse Moore; Australia
Floor exercise	Luke Whitehouse; England	René Cournoyer; Canada	James Hardy; Australia
Pommel horse	Jordan Carroll; Canada	Reuben Ward; Scotland	Cameron Lynn; Scotland
Rings	Félix Dolci; Canada	William Émard; Canada	James Hardy; Australia
Vault	Félix Dolci; Canada	Luke Whitehouse; England	Neofytos Kyriakou; Cyprus
Parallel bars	Jesse Moore; Australia	Marios Georgiou; Cyprus	Félix Dolci; Canada
Horizontal bar	Félix Dolci; Canada	Marios Georgiou; Cyprus	William Émard; Canada

=== Women's events ===
Event	Gold	Silver	Bronze
Team all-around	Australia; Georgia Godwin; Kate McDonald; Ruby Pass; Breanna Scott; Emily Whitehead	Canada; Ellie Black; Gabrielle Black; Lia Monica Fontaine; Alyssa Guerrier-Calixte; Lia Redick	England; Shantae-Eve Amankwaah; Shanna-Kae Grant; Alia Leat; Abigail Martin; Ruby Stacey
Individual all-around	Ellie Black; Canada	Breanna Scott; Australia	Lia Monica Fontaine; Canada
Vault	Lia Monica Fontaine; Canada	Abigail Martin; England	Abigail Roper; Wales
Uneven bars	Kate McDonald; Australia	Ellie Black; Canada	Emily Roper; Wales
Balance beam	Breanna Scott; Australia	Amanda Yap; Singapore	Lia Monica Fontaine; Canada
Floor exercise	Ruby Evans; Wales	Abigail Martin; England	Shantae-Eve Amankwaah; England

== Participating nations ==
There were 22 participating Commonwealth Games Associations (CGAs) in artistic gymnastics with a total of 116 gymnasts (58 men and 58 women). The number of athletes a nation entered is in parentheses beside the name of the country.

- Australia (10)
- Bangladesh (3)
- Barbados (1)
- Canada (10)
- Cayman Islands (2)
- Cyprus (6)
- England (10)
- India (8)
- Isle of Man (1)
- Jamaica (2)
- Malaysia (6)
- Malta (3)
- Namibia (4)
- Northern Ireland (4)
- New Zealand (7)
- Pakistan (1)
- South Africa (6)
- Scotland (9)
- Singapore (8)
- Sri Lanka (3)
- Trinidad and Tobago (2)
- Wales (10)
