= Artistic gymnastics at the 2026 Commonwealth Games – Women's team all-around =

Women's team all-around at the 2026 Commonwealth Games
- Venue: SEC Centre
- Dates: 25 July 2026
- Competitors: 56 from 18 nations
- Winning score: 158.400

Medalists
gold medal	Georgia Godwin; Kate McDonald; Ruby Pass; Breanna Scott; Emily Whitehead	Australia
silver medal	Ellie Black; Gabrielle Black; Lia Monica Fontaine; Alyssa Guerrier-Calixte; Lia Redick	Canada
bronze medal	Shantae-Eve Amankwaah; Shanna-Kae Grant; Alia Leat; Abi Martin; Ruby Stacey	England

The Women's team all-around gymnastics competition at the 2026 Commonwealth Games was held on 25 July 2026 at the SEC Centre in Glasgow, Scotland.

This event also serves as qualification for the individual all-around and apparatus events, with team scores taken from the best three scores on each apparatus during qualification. While all gymnasts take part in the competition, only nations with three or more gymnasts in the event are then credited as a team. Twelve eligible teams entered, consisting of 49 gymnasts, with an additional seven individual gymnasts representing six nations attempting to qualify for all-around and apparatus finals.

== Schedule ==
The schedule was as follows:

All times are British Summer Time (UTC+1)

Date	Time	Round
Saturday 25 July 2026	09:08	Competition

Competition order:

Session	Teams	
Session	Rotation 1	Rotation 2
Morning	Malta and New Zealand	Namibia and individual gymnasts from Cayman Islands and Cyprus
Afternoon	Individual gymnasts from Barbados, Trinidad and Tobago and Sri Lanka (2)	Malaysia and individual gymnast from Jamaica
Evening	India and Singapore	Scotland and Wales
Night	South Africa and England	Australia and Canada

== Results ==
=== Team competition ===
The minimum entry to compete in the team event is three gymnasts, the maximum allowed is five gymnasts. The top three scores on each apparatus count to the team total. The results are as follows:

Rank	Country	Vault (gymnastics)	Uneven bars	Balance beam	Floor (gymnastics)	Total
1st place, gold medalist(s)	Australia	39.850 (4)	40.750 (1)	39.400 (1)	38.400 (3)	158.400
1st place, gold medalist(s)	Georgia Godwin	13.550	12.800	12.900	12.850	158.400
1st place, gold medalist(s)	Kate McDonald		14.200	12.900	12.800	158.400
1st place, gold medalist(s)	Ruby Pass	13.000	13.400	11.700		158.400
1st place, gold medalist(s)	Breanna Scott	12.850	13.150	13.600	12.750	158.400
1st place, gold medalist(s)	Emily Whitehead	13.300			12.500	158.400
2nd place, silver medalist(s)	Canada	41.250 (1)	38.700 (4)	38.450 (2)	38.900 (1)	157.300
2nd place, silver medalist(s)	Ellie Black	13.950	13.850	12.900	12.700	157.300
2nd place, silver medalist(s)	Gabrielle Black		11.600		11.200	157.300
2nd place, silver medalist(s)	Lia Monica Fontaine	13.800	12.200	12.850	13.200	157.300
2nd place, silver medalist(s)	Alyssa Guerrier-Calixte	12.900		12.700		157.300
2nd place, silver medalist(s)	Lia Redick	13.500	12.650	12.700	13.000	157.300
3rd place, bronze medalist(s)	England	40.200 (3)	38.750 (3)	36.750 (3)	38.600 (2)	154.300
3rd place, bronze medalist(s)	Shantae-Eve Amankwaah	12.700	13.500	12.150	13.050	154.300
3rd place, bronze medalist(s)	Shanna-Kae Grant				12.300	154.300
3rd place, bronze medalist(s)	Alia Leat	13.400	12.450	12.800	12.150	154.300
3rd place, bronze medalist(s)	Abigail Martin	13.550	12.800	11.800	13.250	154.300
3rd place, bronze medalist(s)	Ruby Stacey	13.250	11.700	11.550		154.300
4.	Wales	40.700 (2)	40.200 (2)	35.300 (5)	37.200 (4)	153.400
4.	Ruby Evans	14.050	13.300	12.550	12.900	153.400
4.	Abigail Roper	13.450	11.100	11.650		153.400
4.	Emily Roper	13.100	13.600	11.100	11.800	153.400
4.	Frances Stone	13.200		9.800	11.950	153.400
4.	Jemima Taylor		13.300		12.350	153.400
5.	South Africa	36.650 (7)	36.350 (6)	35.400 (4)	34.350 (7)	142.750
5.	Naveen Daries	12.800	12.050	12.350	10.950	142.750
5.	Zelmé Daries	11.500	11.850	11.700	11.800	142.750
5.	Buhle Nhleko					142.750
5.	Caitlin Rooskrantz	12.300	12.450	11.350	11.600	142.750
5.	Karma Viasgie	11.550	11.650	11.350	9.650	142.750
6.	Scotland	37.650 (5)	34.750 (7)	33.600 (7)	34.850 (6)	140.850
6.	Ellee Cheetham	12.700	11.500	11.250	11.250	140.850
6.	Crystelle Lake	13.050	11.700	11.250	12.100	140.850
6.	Ava MacFarlane	10.300	11.550	11.100	11.500	140.850
6.	Lottie Smith	11.900	11.150	10.900	10.600	140.850
7.	Singapore	37.050 (6)	32.100 (8)	34.350 (6)	36.600 (5)	140.100
7.	Emma Goh		10.000	10.650	11.150	140.100
7.	Charlotte Phoon	12.350				140.100
7.	Alena Tan	12.000	10.200	10.750	11.900	140.100
7.	Amanda Yap	12.700	11.900	12.950	12.500	140.100
7.	Emma Yap	11.850	7.500	9.900	12.200	140.100
8.	Malta	36.000 (9)	29.550 (9)	33.600 (7)	31.600 (8)	130.750
8.	Philippa Busuttil	11.650	10.250	12.850	11.150	130.750
8.	Lyana Curmi Inguanez	12.000	8.450	9.100	10.750	130.750
8.	Sophie St. John	12.350	10.850	11.650	9.700	130.750
9.	India	36.650 (7)	27.400 (10)	29.100 (9)	29.850 (10)	123.000
9.	Nishka Agarwal	11.450	9.350	9.000	8.750	123.000
9.	Pranati Nayak	11.950				123.000
9.	Eshitaa Rewale	11.750	9.550	10.050	10.350	123.000
9.	Protistha Samanta	12.950	8.500	10.050	10.750	123.000
10.	Namibia	34.050 (10)	22.500 (12)	24.650 (10)	31.050 (9)	112.250
10.	Sureshni Andrew	11.050	6.850	6.800	9.800	112.250
10.	Tyesha Humphries	11.450	7.800	9.850	10.650	112.250
10.	Anne-Leen Thorburn	11.550	7.850	7.900	10.550	112.250
10.	Jonie Thorburn	10.500	6.250	6.900	9.850	112.250
11.	Malaysia	34.050 (10)	37.500 (5)	23.350 (11)	22.250 (12)	107.550
11.	Cadence Teh Zi Qi	11.750	12.350	10.850	11.800	107.550
11.	Yeap Kang Xian	12.700	11.350	12.500	10.450	107.550
11.	Rachel Yeoh Li Wen		13.800			107.550
12.	New Zealand	25.200 (11)	24.150 (11)	20.800 (12)	22.400 (11)	92.550
12.	Jun McDonald		12.450			92.550
12.	Courtney McGregor	12.950	11.700	11.500	11.150	92.550
12.	Sienna Shields	12.250		9.300	11.250	92.550
Individual competitors
	Georgia Charalampous (CYP)	11.450	11.200	10.200	11.150	44.000
	Sienna Santiago (CAY)	11.250	9.100	9.900	11.250	41.500
	Dailia Burke (TTO)	11.900	9.400	8.600	10.450	40.350
	Nuyara Fernando (SRI)	10.600	9.750	8.600	9.350	38.300
	Alana Walker (JAM)		12.800			12.800
	Tiana Sumanasekera (SRI)			11.050		11.050
	Erin Pinder (BAR)		10.850			10.850

== Qualification results ==
=== Individual all-around ===
The results are as follows:

Position	Gymnast	country	Vault (gymnastics)	Uneven bars	Balance beam	Floor (gymnastics)	Total	Notes
1	Ellie Black	Canada	13.950	13.850	12.900	12.700	53.400	Q
2	Ruby Evans	Wales	14.050	13.300	12.550	12.900	52.800	Q
3	Breanna Scott	Australia	12.850	13.150	13.600	12.750	52.350	Q
4	Georgia Godwin	Australia	13.550	12.800	12.900	12.850	52.100	Q
5	Lia-Monica Fontaine	Canada	13.800	12.200	12.850	13.200	52.050	Q
6	Lia Redick	Canada	13.500	12.650	12.700	13.000	51.850	NR
7	Abigail Martin	England	13.550	12.800	11.800	13.250	51.400	Q
8	Shantae-Eve Amankwaah	England	12.700	13.500	12.150	13.050	51.400	Q
9	Alia Leat	England	13.400	12.450	12.800	12.150	50.800	NR
10	Amanda Yap	Singapore	12.700	11.900	12.950	12.500	50.050	Q
11	Emily Roper	Wales	13.100	13.600	11.100	11.800	49.600	Q
12	Naveen Daries	South Africa	12.800	12.050	12.350	10.950	48.150	Q
13	Crystelle Lake	Scotland	13.050	11.700	11.250	12.100	48.100	Q
14	Caitlin Rooskrantz	South Africa	12.300	12.450	11.350	11.600	47.700	Q
15	Courtney McGregor	New Zealand	12.950	11.700	11.500	11.150	47.300	Q
16	Kang Xian Yeap	Malaysia	12.700	11.350	12.500	10.450	47.000	Q
17	Zelmé Daries	South Africa	11.500	11.850	11.700	11.800	46.850	NR
18	Cadence Zi Qi Teh	Malaysia	11.750	12.350	10.850	11.800	46.750	Q
19	Ellee Cheetham	Scotland	12.700	11.500	11.250	11.250	46.700	Q
20	Philippa Busuttil	Malta	11.650	10.250	12.850	11.150	45.900	Q
21	Alena Tan	Singapore	12.000	10.200	10.750	11.900	44.850	Q
22	Sophie St. John	Malta	12.350	10.850	11.650	9.700	44.550	R1
23	Lottie Smith	Scotland	11.900	11.150	10.900	10.600	44.550	NR
24	Ava MacFarlane	Scotland	10.300	11.550	11.100	11.500	44.450	NR
25	Karma Visagie	South Africa	11.550	11.650	11.350	9.650	44.200	NR
26	Georgia Charalampous	Cyprus	11.450	11.200	10.200	11.150	44.000	R2
27	Protistha Samanta	India	12.950	8.500	10.050	10.750	42.250	R3
28	Eshitaa Rewale	India	11.750	9.550	10.050	10.350	41.700	
29	Sienna Santiago	Cayman Islands	11.250	9.100	9.900	11.250	41.500	
30	Emma Yap	Singapore	11.850	7.500	9.900	12.200	41.450	
31	Dailia Burke	Trinidad and Tobago	11.900	9.400	8.600	10.450	40.350	
32	Lyana Curmi Inguanez	Malta	12.000	8.450	9.100	10.750	40.300	
33	Tyesha Humphries	Namibia	11.450	7.800	9.850	10.650	39.750	
34	Nishka Agarwal	India	11.450	9.350	9.000	8.750	38.550	
35	Nuyara Fernando	Sri Lanka	10.600	9.750	8.600	9.350	38.300	
36	Anne-Leen Thorburn	Namibia	11.550	7.850	7.900	10.550	37.850	
37	Sureshni Andrew	Namibia	11.050	6.850	6.800	9.800	34.500	
38	Jonie Thorburn	Namibia	10.500	6.250	6.900	9.850	33.500	

=== Vault ===
The results are as follows:

Rank	Name	Vault 1	Vault 2	Bonus	Total	Qualification
1	Lia Monica Fontaine (CAN)	13.800	13.300	0.2	13.750	Q
2	Abigail Martin (ENG)	13.550	13.250	0.2	13.600	Q
3	Georgia Godwin (AUS)	13.550	12.750	0.2	13.350	Q
4	Emily Roper (WAL)	13.100	13.100	0.2	13.300	Q
5	Abigail Roper (WAL)	13.450	12.700	0.2	13.275	Q
6	Ruby Stacey (ENG)	13.250	12.400	0.2	13.025	Q
7	Protistha Samanta (IND)	12.950	12.700	0.2	13.025	Q
8	Courtney McGregor (NZL)	12.950	12.500	0.2	12.925	Q
9	Yeap Kang Xian (MAS)	12.700	12.450	0.2	12.775	R1
10	Sienna Shields (NZL)	12.250	12.600	0.2	12.625	R2
11	Pranati Nayak (IND)	11.950	12.800	0.2	12.575	R3
12	Ruby Pass (AUS)	13.000	11.200		12.100	
13	Lyana Curmi Inguanez (MLT)	12.000	11.850		11.925	
14	Dailia Burke (TTO)	11.900	11.950		11.925	
15	Eshitaa Rewale (IND)	11.750	11.700		11.725	
16	Anne-Leen Thorburn (NAM)	11.550	11.400		11.475	
17	Sureshni Andrew (NAM)	11.050	11.400		11.225	
18	Tyesha Humphries (NAM)	10.950	11.900		11.425	
19	Nishka Agarwal (IND)	11.450	10.750		11.075	
20	Jonie Thorburn (NAM)	10.500	11.150		10.825	
21	Nuyara Fernando (SRI)	10.600	9.900		10.250	
–	Naveen Daries (RSA)	12.800	DNS		DNF	

=== Uneven bars ===
The results are as follows:

Rank	Gymnast	Difficulty	Execution	Penalty	Total	Notes
1	Kate McDonald (AUS)	6.000	8.200		14.200	Q
2	Ellie Black (CAN)	5.900	7.950		13.850	Q
3	Rachel Yeoh Li Wen (MAS)	5.600	8.200		13.800	Q
4	Emily Roper (WAL)	5.300	8.300		13.600	Q
5	Shantae-Eve Amankwaah (ENG)	5.700	7.800		13.500	Q
6	Ruby Pass (AUS)	5.500	7.900		13.400	Q
7	Ruby Evans (WAL)	5.200	8.100		13.300	Q
8	Jemima Taylor (WAL)	5.300	8.000		13.300	–
9	Breanna Scott (AUS)	5.000	8.150		13.150	–
10	Georgia Godwin (AUS)	5.200	7.600		12.800	–
11	Alana Walker (JAM)	5.200	7.600		12.800	Q
12	Abigail Martin (ENG)	5.600	7.200		12.800	R1
13	Lia Redick (CAN)	5.100	7.550		12.650	R2
14	Alia Leat (ENG)	4.500	7.950		12.450	–
15	Jun McDonald (NZL)	4.800	7.650		12.450	R3

=== Balance beam ===
The results are as follows:

Rank	Gymnast	Difficulty	Execution	Penalty	Total	Notes
1	Breanna Scott (AUS)	5.600	8.000		13.600	Q
2	Amanda Yap (SGP)	5.300	7.650		12.950	Q
3	Kate McDonald (AUS)	5.100	7.800		12.900	Q
4	Georgia Godwin (AUS)	5.300	7.600		12.900	–
5	Ellie Black (CAN)	5.500	7.400		12.900	Q
6	Lia-Monica Fontaine (CAN)	5.300	7.550		12.850	Q
7	Philippa Busuttil (MLT)	5.400	7.450		12.850	Q
8	Alia Leat (ENG)	5.600	7.200		12.800	Q
9	Alyssa Guerrier-Calixte (CAN)	5.200	7.500		12.700	–
10	Lia Redick (CAN)	5.500	7.200		12.700	–
11	Ruby Evans (WAL)	5.000	7.550		12.550	Q
12	Yeap Kang Xian (MAS)	5.400	7.100		12.500	R1
13	Naveen Daries (RSA)	4.800	7.550		12.350	R2
14	Shantae-Eve Amankwaah (ENG)	4.900	7.250		12.150	R3

=== Floor ===
The results are as follows:

Rank	Gymnast	Difficulty	Execution	Penalty	Total	Notes
1	Abigail Martin (ENG)	5.800	7.450		13.250	Q
2	Lia-Monica Fontaine (CAN)	5.700	7.500		13.200	Q
3	Shantae-Eve Amankwaah (ENG)	5.200	7.850		13.050	Q
4	Lia Redick (CAN)	5.400	7.600		13.000	Q
5	Ruby Evans (WAL)	5.400	7.800	0.3	12.900	Q
6	Georgia Godwin (AUS)	5.300	7.550		12.850	Q
7	Kate McDonald (AUS)	4.900	7.900		12.800	Q
8	Breanna Scott (AUS)	5.000	7.750		12.750	–
9	Ellie Black (CAN)	5.400	7.400	0.1	12.700	–
10	Emily Whitehead (AUS)	4.700	7.800		12.500	–
11	Amanda Yap (SGP)	4.900	7.600		12.500	Q
12	Jemima Taylor (WAL)	4.900	7.450		12.350	R1
13	Shanna-Kae Grant (ENG)	5.000	7.300		12.300	–
14	Emma Yap (SGP)	4.900	7.300		12.200	R2
15	Alia Leat (ENG)	5.300	6.950	0.1	12.150	–
16	Crystelle Lake (SCO)	5.100	7.100	0.1	12.100	R3
