= Artistic gymnastics at the 2026 Commonwealth Games – Women's balance beam =

Women's balance beam at the 2026 Commonwealth Games
- Venue: OVO Hydro
- Dates: 25 July 2026 (qualification); 28 July 2026 (final)
- Competitors: 8 from 6 nations
- Winning score: 13.933

Medalists
gold medal	Breanna Scott	Australia
silver medal	Amanda Yap	Singapore
bronze medal	Lia Monica Fontaine	Canada

The Women's balance beam gymnastics competition at the 2026 Commonwealth Games in Glasgow, Scotland was held on 28 July 2026 at OVO Hydro.

== Schedule ==
The schedule was as follows:

All times are British Summer Time (UTC+1)

Date	Time	Round
Saturday 25 July 2026	09:09	Qualification
Tuesday 28 July 2026	13:50	Final

== Results ==
=== Qualification ===
Qualification for this apparatus final was determined within the team final.

The results are as follows:

Rank	Gymnast	Difficulty	Execution	Penalty	Total	Notes
1	Breanna Scott (AUS)	5.600	8.000		13.600	Q
2	Amanda Yap (SGP)	5.300	7.650		12.950	Q
3	Kate McDonald (AUS)	5.100	7.800		12.900	Q
4	Georgia Godwin (AUS)	5.300	7.600		12.900	–
5	Ellie Black (CAN)	5.500	7.400		12.900	Q
6	Lia-Monica Fontaine (CAN)	5.300	7.550		12.850	Q
7	Philippa Busuttil (MLT)	5.400	7.450		12.850	Q
8	Alia Leat (ENG)	5.600	7.200		12.800	Q
9	Alyssa Guerrier-Calixte (CAN)	5.200	7.500		12.700	–
10	Lia Redick (CAN)	5.500	7.200		12.700	–
11	Ruby Evans (WAL)	5.000	7.550		12.550	Q
12	Yeap Kang Xian (MAS)	5.400	7.100		12.500	R1
13	Naveen Daries (RSA)	4.800	7.550		12.350	R2
14	Shantae-Eve Amankwaah (ENG)	4.900	7.250		12.150	R3

=== Final ===
The results are as follows:

Rank	Gymnast	Country	Difficulty	Execution	Penalty	Total
1st place, gold medalist(s)	Breanna Scott	Australia	5.600	8.333		13.933
2nd place, silver medalist(s)	Amanda Yap	Singapore	5.000	8.233		13.233
3rd place, bronze medalist(s)	Lia-Monica Fontaine	Canada	5.400	7.600		13.000
4	Ellie Black	Canada	5.400	7.566		12.966
5	Alia Leat	England	6.000	6.866		12.866
6	Phillipa Busuttil	Malta	5.400	7.400		12.800
7	Ruby Evans	Wales	5.000	7.300		12.300
8	Kate McDonald	Australia	4.800	7.366		12.166
