= Becky Downie =

British artistic gymnast (born 1992)

Becky Downie MBE
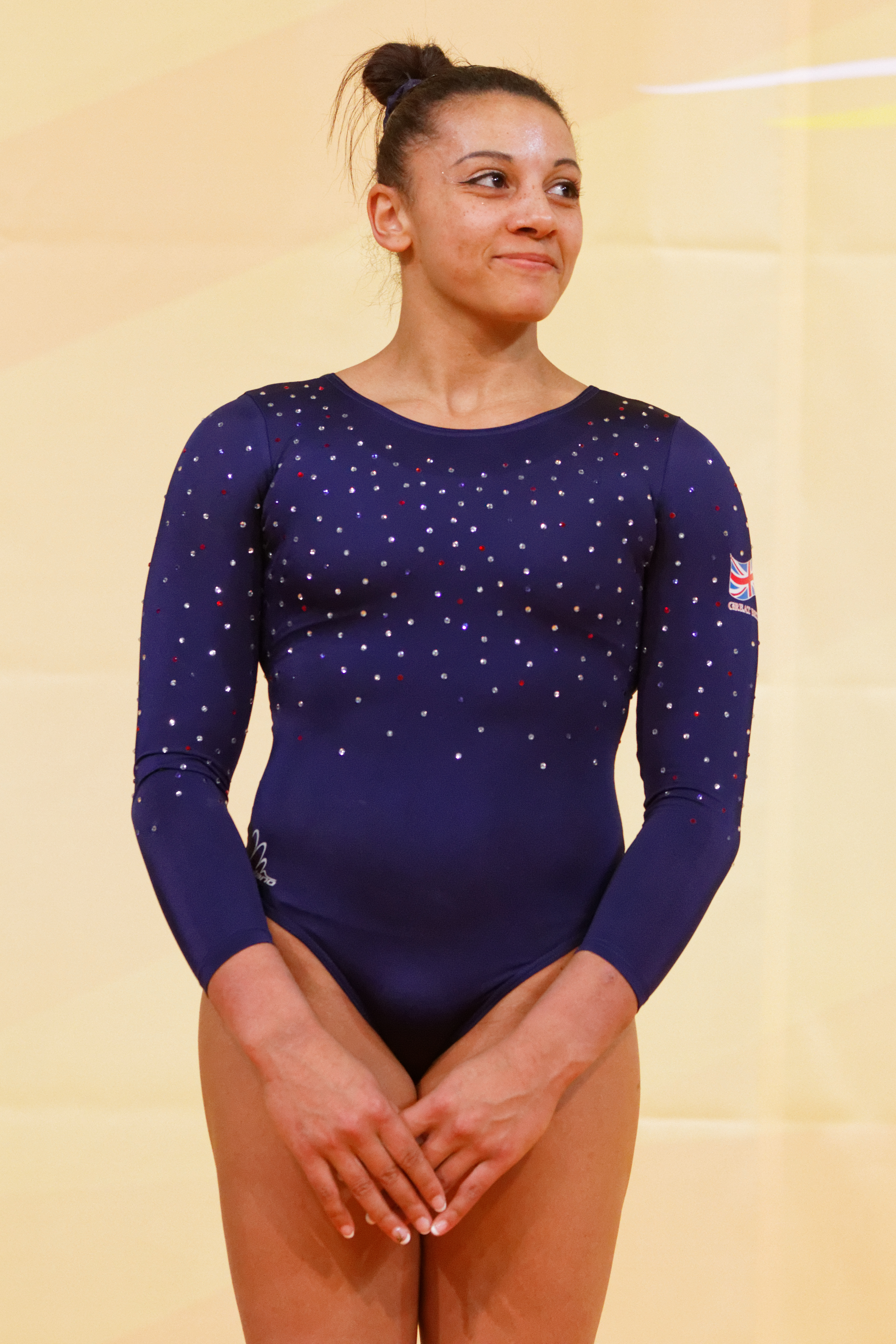
- Downie winning a silver medal at the 2015 European Championships in Montpellier, France.

Personal information
- Full name: Rebecca Downie
- Nickname: Becky
- Born: 24 January 1992 (age 34) Nottingham, United Kingdom
- Height: 155 cm (5 ft 1 in)
- Relatives: Ellie Downie (sister)

Gymnastics career
- Discipline: Women's artistic gymnastics
- Country represented: (United Kingdom) Great Britain England; (2006–Present)
- Club: Rugby Gymnastics Club; Amber Valley Gymnastics Academy (formerly); Notts Gymnastics Academy (formerly)
- Head coach: Jenny Clay
- Eponymous skills: stalder backwards on high bar with counter pike – reverse hecht over high bar to hang (uneven bars)
- Awards: Longines Prize for Elegance (2016)
Medal record
Event	1st	2nd	3rd
World Championships	0	1	1
European Games	0	1	0
European Championships	3	7	0
Commonwealth Games	2	1	1
Total	5	10	2
Representing Great Britain
World Championships
Silver medal – second place	2019 Stuttgart	Uneven Bars
Bronze medal – third place	2015 Glasgow	Team
European Games
Silver medal – second place	2019 Minsk	Uneven Bars
European Championships
Gold medal – first place	2014 Sofia	Uneven bars
Gold medal – first place	2016 Bern	Uneven bars
Gold medal – first place	2023 Antalya	Team
Silver medal – second place	2010 Birmingham	Team
Silver medal – second place	2014 Sofia	Team
Silver medal – second place	2015 Montpellier	Uneven bars
Silver medal – second place	2015 Montpellier	Balance beam
Silver medal – second place	2016 Bern	Team
Silver medal – second place	2023 Antalya	Uneven bars
Silver medal – second place	2024 Rimini	Team
Representing England
Commonwealth Games
Gold medal – first place	2014 Glasgow	Team
Gold medal – first place	2014 Glasgow	Uneven bars
Silver medal – second place	2006 Melbourne	Team
Bronze medal – third place	2006 Melbourne	Balance beam

Rebecca "Becky" Lauren Downie MBE (born 24 January 1992) is a British artistic gymnast who competed at the 2008, 2016, and 2024 Summer Olympics. She is a double European champion (2014 and 2016) and 2014 Commonwealth Games champion on the uneven bars as well as the 2019 World silver medallist.

== Junior career ==
Representing England at the 2006 Commonwealth Games in Melbourne, Downie contributed an all-around score of 54.100 to the English team's second-place finish and placed eighth in the all-around final with a score of 53.700. In event finals, she placed fifth on uneven bars, scoring 14.000, and third on balance beam, scoring 14.075.

== Senior career ==
=== 2008 ===
At the 2008 European Women's Artistic Gymnastics Championships in Clermont-Ferrand in early April, Downie contributed scores of 14.750 on vault, 15.375 on uneven bars, and 14.850 on balance beam to the British team's sixth-place finish. In event finals, she placed eighth on vault (13.500) and uneven bars (14.700). Later in April, she won a silver medal on bars at the Artistic Gymnastics World Cup event in Cottbus, with a score of 14.975.

In June, Downie competed at the British Championships in Guildford, where she won the all-around competition (59.650) and the uneven bars title (15.200) and placed fourth on balance beam (14.500). Afterwards, she was named to the British team for the 2008 Summer Olympics in Beijing.

At the Olympics in August, Downie contributed an all-around score of 58.075 to the British team's ninth-place finish. In the individual all-around final, she scored 59.450 to place twelfth.

=== 2009 ===
In March, Downie placed fourth at the American Cup in Chicago with a score of 55.600. The following month, she competed at the 2009 European Championships in Milan, where she placed eleventh in the all-around final (55.075) and sixth on vault (14.025) and uneven bars (14.525).

At a World Cup event in Glasgow in May, she placed sixth on vault (12.925), second on uneven bars (14.600), and fifth on balance beam (13.300).

In March, she won the all-around at the British Championships in Liverpool with a score of 56.100. In event finals, she placed second on vault, scoring 13.250; first on uneven bars, scoring 13.850; first on balance beam, scoring 14.900; and first on floor, scoring 13.750.

In October, Downie competed at the 2009 World Artistic Gymnastics Championships in London. She placed sixteenth in the all-around final with a score of 53.775.

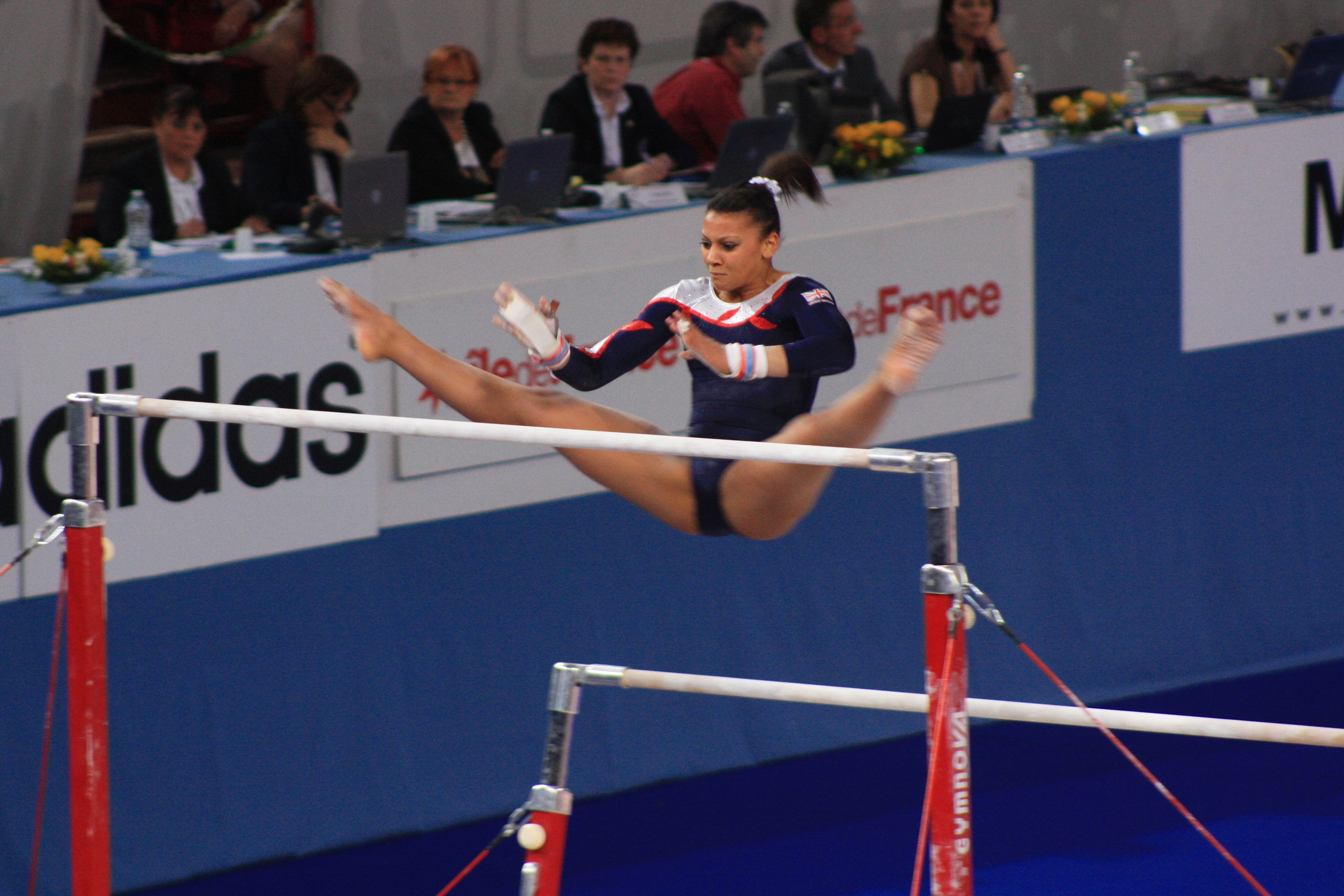
Downie during a routine on the uneven bars at the 17th Internationaux de France in 2010.

=== 2010 ===
In April, Downie placed tenth on uneven bars (13.300) and ninth on balance beam (13.875) at the World Cup event in Paris. In May, at the 2010 European Championships in Birmingham, she contributed scores of 14.075 on vault, 14.350 on uneven bars, and 14.100 on balance beam to the British team's second-place finish, and placed fifth in the bars final with a score of 14.625.

At the 2010 World Championships in Rotterdam in October, she contributed a vault score of 14.733 to the British team's seventh-place finish.

=== 2011 ===
Downie injured her Achilles tendon in January 2011 and was expected to be out of competition for the rest of the year. However, she was able to return in nine months. "I guess the key for my quick return was that I was backed 100 percent by a fantastic medical team, and rather than let myself get down about the injury, I just had to keep reminding myself of all the positives that could come from it," she said. "I took the opportunity to give my body a break which wouldn't have been possible without the injury, and then everything just moved so quickly."

In October, she competed at the 2011 World Championships in Tokyo and contributed an uneven bars score of 14.433 to the British team's fifth-place finish.

=== 2012 ===
At the beginning of June, Downie competed at an international friendly in Ipswich with gymnasts from Finland and Spain, which also served as Britain's second Olympic trial. She placed fourth on vault with a score of 14.100 and fourth on balance beam with a score of 13.450.

The British Championships in Liverpool at the end of June were the third and final trial to determine the British team for the 2012 Summer Olympics in London. Downie did not compete on floor but scored 14.550 on vault, 14.25 on uneven bars, and 13.100 on balance beam. In event finals, she placed sixth on uneven bars with a score of 13.350 and second on balance beam with a score of 13.850. She did not make the Olympic team, but was named as an alternate.

=== 2013 ===
At the 2013 European Championships, Downie qualified second into the uneven bars final with a score of 14.733, behind only reigning Olympic uneven bars champion Aliya Mustafina. However, a fall in the final left her in seventh place with a score of 13.000.

=== 2014 ===
Downie was a member of the British team that won a silver medal at the 2014 European Championships, after qualifying to the team final in first place. Individually, she won the uneven bars title—the second British woman to do so after Beth Tweddle—and finished fourth in the balance beam final.

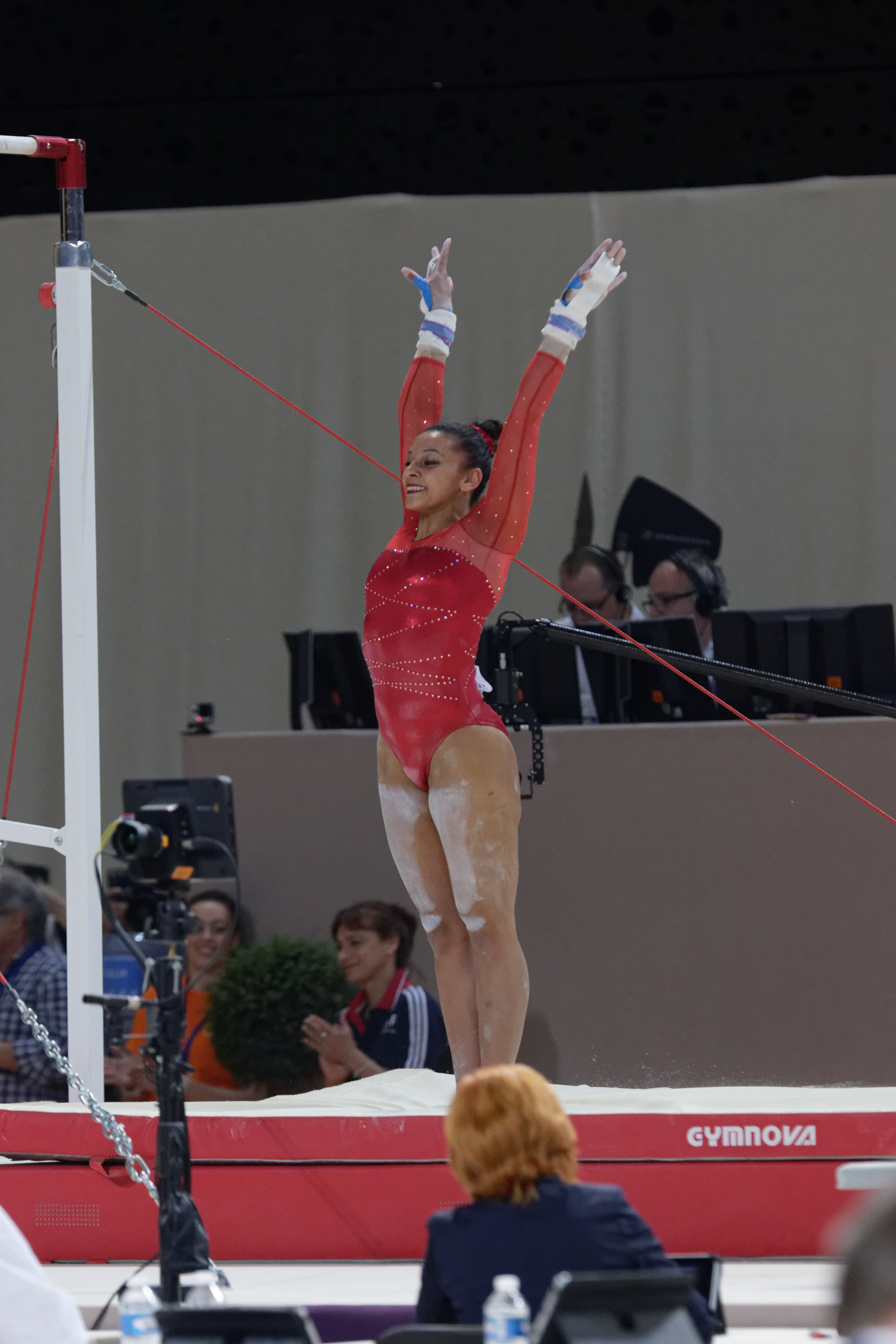
Downie at the European Championships in 2015, where she won two silver medals.

In July, she won gold with the English team at the 2014 Commonwealth Games in Glasgow, alongside teammates Claudia Fragapane, Ruby Harrold, Kelly Simm, and Hannah Whelan. She also won the uneven bars final with a score of 14.666; Harrold placed third. However, she fell twice in the balance beam final and was unable to finish her routine, resulting in a score of 9.833.

At the 2014 World Championships in Nanning, Downie performed well on bars and beam to help Britain qualify to the team final in fourth place: the highest ever qualification placement for a British women's team at a World Championships. She also qualified to the bars final in sixth place with a score of 15.166, and finished fifth in the final with the same score.

=== 2015 ===
At the 2015 European Championships, Downie won silver medals on the uneven bars and balance beam. Later in the year, she helped Britain win its first-ever team World Championship medal in women's gymnastics, a bronze at the 2015 Championships in Glasgow.

=== 2016 ===
Downie was named to the British team for the 2016 Summer Olympics in Rio de Janeiro—her second Olympics—alongside her younger sister Ellie Downie, Claudia Fragapane, Ruby Harrold, and Amy Tinkler. She entered the competition as a contender on uneven bars, but placed 10th in a packed field in qualifications and did not qualify to the final. However, the British team finished fifth, Britain's best Olympic result in women's gymnastics since 1928.

=== 2017 ===
Downie competed on uneven bars and balance beam at the 2017 European Championships in Cluj-Napoca. She qualified to the bars final in fourth place with a score of 14.433, but in the final, she placed seventh with a score of 13.000 after falling on a release move and injuring her elbow. She withdrew from the beam final the next day because of the injury.

=== 2018 ===
On 6 July Downie was named to the team to compete at the 2018 European Championships alongside Alice Kinsella, Georgia-Mae Fenton, Kelly Simm, and Lucy Stanhope. On 7–8 July Downie returned to competition and competed at the Heerenveen Friendly where she tied for first on uneven bars and Great Britain placed third in the team final. Downie withdrew from the European Championships after sustaining an ankle injury during podium training.

On September 27, Downie was named to the team to compete at the World Championships in Doha, Qatar alongside Alice Kinsella, Ellie Downie, Georgia-Mae Fenton, and Kelly Simm.

=== 2019 ===
In May, Downie was named to the team to compete at the 2019 European Games alongside Georgia-Mae Fenton. She won silver on uneven bars behind Angelina Melnikova of Russia.

In September, Downie was named to the team to compete at the 2019 World Championships in Stuttgart alongside Alice Kinsella, Ellie Downie, Taeja James, and Georgia-Mae Fenton. During qualifications Downie helped Great Britain place seventh, earning a spot in the team final and qualifying a team for Great Britain to the 2020 Olympic Games in Tokyo. Individually Downie qualified for the uneven bars final. During the team final she contributed scores on uneven bars and balance beam towards Great Britain's sixth-place finish. In the uneven bars final Downie performed a clean routine, earning a score of 15.000 and winning the silver medal behind reigning World uneven bars Champion Nina Derwael of Belgium. This was Downie's first individual World Championships medal. Earlier that day Downie's sister Ellie won her first individual World Championships medal, a bronze medal on vault.

=== 2021 ===
In March Downie competed on uneven bars and balance beam in three trials for the British Olympic team. At the first trial she placed first on balance beam; at the second trial she placed third on uneven bars; and at the third trial she placed first on uneven bars and third on balance beam.

On 6 May, the night before the final Olympic trial was set to begin, Downie's brother Joshua died suddenly at a cricket match at the age of 24. Downie subsequently did not compete in that weekend's trial, and on 13 May British Gymnastics announced that they would delay the selection process in order to give her a fair chance of making the team. However, Downie was later controversially omitted from the British Olympic team. Downie, who alongside her sister Ellie was among the athletes who spoke out against the culture of abuse in British Gymnastics in 2020, stated "I have been told by a person of significant importance—in the national team environment—that a lot of coaches do not agree with what we've [Downie and her sister] done. Maybe I did open my mouth a year too soon, I'm not sure. If this is the sacrifice [an Olympics] then this is the sacrifice, change needs to happen. I’m proud of what I did and I don’t regret it."

In September, Downie was selected to compete at the 2021 World Championships but did not qualify to any finals.

=== 2022 ===
At the 2022 English Championships, Downie placed second on uneven bars, seventh on balance beam, and fifth on floor exercise. At the British Championships Downie competed the all-around for the first time in eight years; she placed sixth. She withdrew from the uneven bars final citing illness.

In April 2022, she and sister Ellie received honorary degrees in sport from Nottingham Trent University.

=== 2023 ===
Downie was originally slated to complete at the Scottish Championships, but withdrew on 16 February. On February 25, she competed at the English Championships and placed eighth on bars. On March 11, Downie competed at the Welsh Championships where she placed first on bars with a 14.550 and fourth on beam with a 12.850. On March 21 it was confirmed that she was part of the British team for the 2023 European Championships alongside Ondine Achampong, Georgia-Mae Fenton, Jessica Gadirova, and Alice Kinsella. On March 26, 2023, at the British Championships Downie placed 1st on uneven bars with a score of 14.350 but withdrew from the balance beam final, citing an ankle injury. Downie helped Great Britain win their first European Championships team gold medal. Additionally she qualified to the uneven bars final. On 15 April she competed in the final and placed second with the score of 14.233.

=== 2024 ===
Downie began her season at the Cairo World Cup, qualifying to event finals on the uneven bars where she finished seventh. At the English Championships she placed third on bars. At British Championships she competed bars and beam, qualifying to event finals on bars where she finished sixth. She was named to the European Championships team, alongside Alice Kinsella, Ondine Achampong (later replaced by Abigail Martin), Ruby Evans, and Georgia-Mae Fenton. Together they won silver in the team final behind Italy.

In June Downie was selected to represent Great Britain at the 2024 Summer Olympics alongside Kinsella, Evans, Fenton, and Martin. During qualifications at the Olympic Games, Downie helped Great Britain qualify to the team final and individually she qualified to the uneven bars final. During the team final Downie contributed scores on uneven bars and balance beam towards Great Britain's fourth place finish. During the uneven bars final she fell off the apparatus and finished in seventh place.

=== 2025 ===
In January 2025 Downie underwent two shoulder surgeries to repair her labrum and rotator cuff at the same time, targeting a 2026 return. She later revealed that shortly after returning from the Paris Olympics she was diagnosed with uterine fibroids, which due to their large size required abdominal surgery. She underwent a third surgery in 2025, a successful myomectomy to remove 10 fibroids.

=== 2026 ===
Downie made her return to competition following her three surgeries at English Championships, where she won silver on the uneven bars and placed seventh on balance beam. She was selected to represent Great Britain at the 2026 World Championships alongside Ruby Evans, Abigail Martin, Alice Kinsella, Alia Leat, and alternate Shantae-Eve Amankwaah.

== Honours ==
Becky and Ellie Downie were both appointed Member of the Order of the British Empire (MBE) in the 2024 New Year Honours for services to gymnasts and the sport of gymnastics, which they received together from Princess Anne at Windsor Castle in early March.

== Eponymous skill ==
Downie has one uneven bars release move named after her in the Code of Points.

Apparatus	Name	Description	Difficulty (Note: Valid for the 2025–2028 Code of Points)	Added to the Code of Points
Uneven bars	Downie	Stalder backward on high bar with counter piкe - reverse hecht over high bar to hang	F (0.6)	2010 World Championships

== Competitive history ==
Competitive history of Becky Downie
Year	Event	Team	AA	VT	UB	BB	FX
2006
2006	Commonwealth Games	2nd place, silver medalist(s)	8		5	3rd place, bronze medalist(s)	
2007
2007	World Championships	7					
2008	GBR-FRA International Friendly	2nd place, silver medalist(s)	2nd place, silver medalist(s)	5	1st place, gold medalist(s)	5	
2008	European Championships	6		8	8		
2008	Cottbus World Cup				2nd place, silver medalist(s)		
2008	British Championships		1st place, gold medalist(s)		1st place, gold medalist(s)	4	
2008	Olympic Games	9	12				
2009	American Cup		4				
2009	European Championships		11	6	6		
2009	Glasgow World Cup			6	2nd place, silver medalist(s)	5	
2009	British Championships		1st place, gold medalist(s)	2nd place, silver medalist(s)	1st place, gold medalist(s)	1st place, gold medalist(s)	1st place, gold medalist(s)
2009	British Team Championships	3rd place, bronze medalist(s)					
2009	World Championships		15				
2010	Paris World Cup				10	9	
2010	British Team Championships	2nd place, silver medalist(s)					
2010	European Championships	2nd place, silver medalist(s)			5		
2010	World Championships	7					
2011
2011	World Championships	5					
2012	GBR-FIN-ESP Friendly			4		4	
2012	British Team Championships	3rd place, bronze medalist(s)					
2012	British Championships				6	2nd place, silver medalist(s)	
2013	British Championships				1st place, gold medalist(s)		
2013	European Championships				7		
2013	Turnen Dames Interland		20		2nd place, silver medalist(s)	2nd place, silver medalist(s)	
2013	World Championships				8		
2013	Élite Gym Massilia	3rd place, bronze medalist(s)					
2014	English Championships				2nd place, silver medalist(s)	1st place, gold medalist(s)	
2014	British Championships		2nd place, silver medalist(s)		2nd place, silver medalist(s)	1st place, gold medalist(s)	
2014	Munich Friendly	1st place, gold medalist(s)					
2014	European Championships	2nd place, silver medalist(s)			1st place, gold medalist(s)	4	
2014	Commonwealth Games	1st place, gold medalist(s)			1st place, gold medalist(s)	8	
2014	World Championships	6			5		
2015	English Championships				1st place, gold medalist(s)	4	
2015	European Championships				2nd place, silver medalist(s)	2nd place, silver medalist(s)	
2015	World Championships	3rd place, bronze medalist(s)					
2016	English Championships				2nd place, silver medalist(s)	4	
2016	British Championships				2nd place, silver medalist(s)	1st place, gold medalist(s)	
2016	European Championships	2nd place, silver medalist(s)			1st place, gold medalist(s)	6	
2016	Olympic Games	5					
2017	British Championships				3rd place, bronze medalist(s)		
2017	English Championships				1st place, gold medalist(s)		
2017	European Championships				7	WD	
2018	Heerenveen Friendly	3rd place, bronze medalist(s)			1st place, gold medalist(s)		
2018	World Championships	R1			7		
2019
2019	European Games				2nd place, silver medalist(s)		
2019	World Championships	6			2nd place, silver medalist(s)		
2021	British Olympic Trial 1				4	1st place, gold medalist(s)	
2021	British Olympic Trial 2				3rd place, bronze medalist(s)	5	
2021	British Olympic Trial 3				1st place, gold medalist(s)	3rd place, bronze medalist(s)	
2021	World Championships				R2	R1	
2022	English Championships				2nd place, silver medalist(s)	7	5
2022	British Championships		6		WD		
2023	British Championships				1st place, gold medalist(s)		
2023	European Championships	1st place, gold medalist(s)			2nd place, silver medalist(s)		
2024	Cairo World Cup				7		
2024	English Championships				3rd place, bronze medalist(s)	4	12
2024	British Championships				6		
2024	European Championships	2nd place, silver medalist(s)			7		
2024	Olympic Games	4			7		
2026	English Championships				2nd place, silver medalist(s)	7	
2026	British Championships				1st place, gold medalist(s)	5	
2026	European Championships	4					
2026	World Championships	R1					
