= Gabrielle Black =

Canadian artistic gymnast (born 2008)

- Born: February 27, 2008 (age 18) Milton, Ontario, Canada

Gymnastics career
- Country represented: Canada
- College team: Utah Red Rocks
- Club: Halifax Alta Gymnastics
- Head coach: David Kikuchi
Medal record
Women's artistic gymnastics
Representing Canada
Commonwealth Games
Silver medal – second place	2026 Glasgow	Team
Pan American Championships
Silver medal – second place	2025 Panama City	Team
Bronze medal – third place	2026 Rio de Janeiro	Team

Gabrielle Black (born February 27, 2008) is a Canadian artistic gymnast. She was a member of the Canadian teams that won silver and bronze at the 2025 and 2026 Pan American Championships, respectively, as well as a silver at the 2026 Commonwealth Games. She is also a two-time national champion on balance beam. Black represented Canada at the 2025 and 2026 World Championships.

== Senior career ==
=== 2024 ===
Black made her international senior debut at the 2024 DTB Pokal Team Challenge. As a team, Canada finished fourth, just 0.100 out of bronze medal position. Individually, Black won the gold medal on vault.

At the City of Jesolo Trophy in April, Black finished seventh with the Canada B team and qualified for the vault final, where she ultimately finished sixth.

Black was selected to compete at the 2024 Canadian Olympic Trials. Though she was not chosen as an Olympic team member or alternate, she placed sixth in the all-around.

On October 22, 2024, Black announced her commitment to compete for the Utah Red Rocks in NCAA gymnastics.

=== 2025 ===
In March 2025, Black competed at the International Gymnix, contributing to the Canada 1 team's gold-medal finish. She placed fifth in the all-around and won the silver medal in the vault final.

At the 2025 DTB Pokal Team Challenge, Black won the gold medal in the all-around, as well as on vault. Additionally, the Canadian team won silver in the women's team competition.

Black participated in the 2025 Canadian Championships in May, where she took the national title on balance beam. She also won silver in the all-around and bronze on floor exercise.

The 2025 Pan American Championships were held in June, and Black won silver in the team competition alongside Canadian teammates Lia-Monica Fontaine, Alyssa Guerrier-Calixte, Lia Redick, and Evandra Zlobec. She also took fourth place in the all-around and qualified for the vault and uneven bars finals, where she finished fifth and fourth, respectively.

Black was named to the Canadian team for the 2025 World Championships in Jakarta, along with teammates Fontaine, Ellie Black, and Shallon Olsen. She competed on all four events and was third reserve for the vault final, less than a tenth away from making the final outright.

=== 2026 ===
At the 2026 International Gymnix, Black once again won gold with the Canada 1 team and placed fifth in the all-around. She also won the bronze medal in vault final.

In March, she won her third-straight vault title at the DTB Pokal Team Challenge. She won another gold medal with the Canadian team as well as silver in the all-around.

The 2026 Canadian Championships saw Black win the national balance beam title for the second year in a row. In addition to repeating as the all-around silver medalist, she won bronze on vault and silver on floor exercise.

Black was part of the bronze-medal Canadian winning team at the 2026 Pan American Championships, with teammates Lia-Monica Fontaine, Lia Redick, Alyssa Guerrier-Calixte, and Aurélie Tran. She qualified for the vault final, where she finished eighth, and the floor final, where she finished fifth. She placed eleventh in the all-around during qualifications, but did not advance to the all-around final due to the two-per-country rule.

In July, Black was named to the Canadian team for the 2026 Commonwealth Games, alongside Fontaine, Redick, Guerrier-Calixte, and Ellie Black. They won the silver medal in the team competition.

On September 4, 2026, Utah Gymnastics announced that Black would be deferring her enrollment to 2029 to focus on training for the 2028 Olympics.

Black was named to the Canadian team for the 2026 World Championships in Rotterdam. During the qualification round, she received the sixth-highest floor exercise score, but was ineligible for the final due to the two-per-country rule. Canada advanced to the team final, where they ultimately placed eighth.

== Competitive history ==
Competitive history of Gabrielle Black at the junior level
Year	Event	Team	AA	VT	UB	BB	FX
2020	Elite Canada		7	3rd place, bronze medalist(s)			
2022	Elite Canada		14				
2022	Canadian Championships		13			2nd place, silver medalist(s)	
2023	Elite Canada		1st place, gold medalist(s)	2nd place, silver medalist(s)		1st place, gold medalist(s)	
2023	U.S./Canada Junior Friendly		13				
2023	DTB Pokal Team Challenge	2nd place, silver medalist(s)	4		3rd place, bronze medalist(s)		
2023	Canadian Championships		7	2nd place, silver medalist(s)		3rd place, bronze medalist(s)	
2023	Top Gym Tournament		1st place, gold medalist(s)	2nd place, silver medalist(s)			2nd place, silver medalist(s)

Competitive history of Gabrielle Black at the senior level
Year	Event	Team	AA	VT	UB	BB	FX
2024	Elite Canada		5				3rd place, bronze medalist(s)
2024	DTB Pokal Team Challenge	4	8	1st place, gold medalist(s)			
2024	City of Jesolo Trophy	7		6			
2024	Canadian Championships		6	2nd place, silver medalist(s)			
2024	Sokol Grand Prix	1st place, gold medalist(s)					
2025	Elite Canada		2nd place, silver medalist(s)	3rd place, bronze medalist(s)			2nd place, silver medalist(s)
2025	International Gymnix	1st place, gold medalist(s)	5	2nd place, silver medalist(s)			
2025	DTB Pokal Team Challenge	2nd place, silver medalist(s)	1st place, gold medalist(s)	1st place, gold medalist(s)			3rd place, bronze medalist(s)
2025	Canadian Championships		2nd place, silver medalist(s)	2nd place, silver medalist(s)		1st place, gold medalist(s)	3rd place, bronze medalist(s)
2025	Pan American Championships	2nd place, silver medalist(s)	4	5	4		
2025	World Championships	—N/a	44	R3			
2026
2026	Elite Canada		2nd place, silver medalist(s)	1st place, gold medalist(s)			2nd place, silver medalist(s)
2026	International Gymnix	1st place, gold medalist(s)	5	3rd place, bronze medalist(s)			
2026	DTB Pokal Team Challenge	1st place, gold medalist(s)	2nd place, silver medalist(s)	1st place, gold medalist(s)			
2026	Canadian Championships		2nd place, silver medalist(s)	3rd place, bronze medalist(s)		1st place, gold medalist(s)	2nd place, silver medalist(s)
2026	Pan American Championships	3rd place, bronze medalist(s)		8			5
2026	Commonwealth Games	2nd place, silver medalist(s)					
2026	World Championships	8					
