= Artistic gymnastics at the 2026 Commonwealth Games – Women's vault =

Women's vault at the 2026 Commonwealth Games
- Venue: OVO Hydro
- Dates: 25 July 2026 (qualification); 27 July 2026 (final)
- Competitors: 8 from 6 nations
- Winning score: 14.000

Medalists
gold medal	Lia Monica Fontaine	Canada
silver medal	Abigail Martin	England
bronze medal	Abigail Roper	Wales

The Women's vault gymnastics competition at the 2026 Commonwealth Games in Glasgow, Scotland was held on 27 July 2026 at OVO Hydro.

== Schedule ==
The schedule was as follows:

All times are British Summer Time (UTC+1)

Date	Time	Round
Saturday 25 July 2026	09:09	Qualification
Monday 27 July 2026	13:45	Final

== Results ==
=== Qualification ===
Qualification for this apparatus final was determined within the team final.

The results are as follows:

Rank	Name	Vault 1	Vault 2	Bonus	Total	Qualification
1	Lia Monica Fontaine (CAN)	13.800	13.300	0.2	13.750	Q
2	Abigail Martin (ENG)	13.550	13.250	0.2	13.600	Q
3	Georgia Godwin (AUS)	13.550	12.750	0.2	13.350	Q
4	Emily Roper (WAL)	13.100	13.100	0.2	13.300	Q
5	Abigail Roper (WAL)	13.450	12.700	0.2	13.275	Q
6	Ruby Stacey (ENG)	13.250	12.400	0.2	13.025	Q
7	Protistha Samanta (IND)	12.950	12.700	0.2	13.025	Q
8	Courtney McGregor (NZL)	12.950	12.500	0.2	12.925	Q
9	Yeap Kang Xian (MAS)	12.700	12.450	0.2	12.775	R1
10	Sienna Shields (NZL)	12.250	12.600	0.2	12.625	R2
11	Pranati Nayak (IND)	11.950	12.800	0.2	12.575	R3
12	Ruby Pass (AUS)	13.000	11.200		12.100	
13	Lyana Curmi Inguanez (MLT)	12.000	11.850		11.925	
14	Dailia Burke (TTO)	11.900	11.950		11.925	
15	Eshitaa Rewale (IND)	11.750	11.700		11.725	
16	Anne-Leen Thorburn (NAM)	11.550	11.400		11.475	
17	Sureshni Andrew (NAM)	11.050	11.400		11.225	
18	Tyesha Humphries (NAM)	10.950	11.900		11.425	
19	Nishka Agarwal (IND)	11.450	10.750		11.075	
20	Jonie Thorburn (NAM)	10.500	11.150		10.825	
21	Nuyara Fernando (SRI)	10.600	9.900		10.250	
–	Naveen Daries (RSA)	12.800	DNS		DNF	

=== Final ===
The results are as follows:

Rank	Name	D Score	E Score	Pen.	Score 1	D Score	E Score	Pen.	Score 2	Bonus	Total
Rank	Name	Vault 1				Vault 2				Bonus	Total
1st place, gold medalist(s)	Lia Monica Fontaine (CAN)	5.000	9.000		14.000	4.800	8.800		13.600	0.2	14.000
2nd place, silver medalist(s)	Abigail Martin (ENG)	5.000	8.766		13.766	4.800	8.633		13.433	0.2	13.799
3rd place, bronze medalist(s)	Abigail Roper (WAL)	5.000	8.766		13.766	4.000	8.700		12.700	0.2	13.433
4	Emily Roper (WAL)	4.200	8.900		13.100	4.800	8.566	0.3	13.066	0.2	13.283
5	Courtney McGregor (NZL)	4.600	8.666		13.266	4.200	8.500		12.700	0.2	13.183
6	Georgia Godwin (AUS)	4.800	8.600	0.3	13.100	4.000	8.733		12.733	0.2	13.116
7	Protistha Samanta (IND)	4.400	8.300		12.700	4.000	8.666		12.666	0.2	12.883
8	Ruby Stacey (ENG)	4.200	8.600	0.1	12.700	3.800	7.500		11.300		12.000
