= Lia-Monica Fontaine =

Canadian artistic gymnast (born 2009)

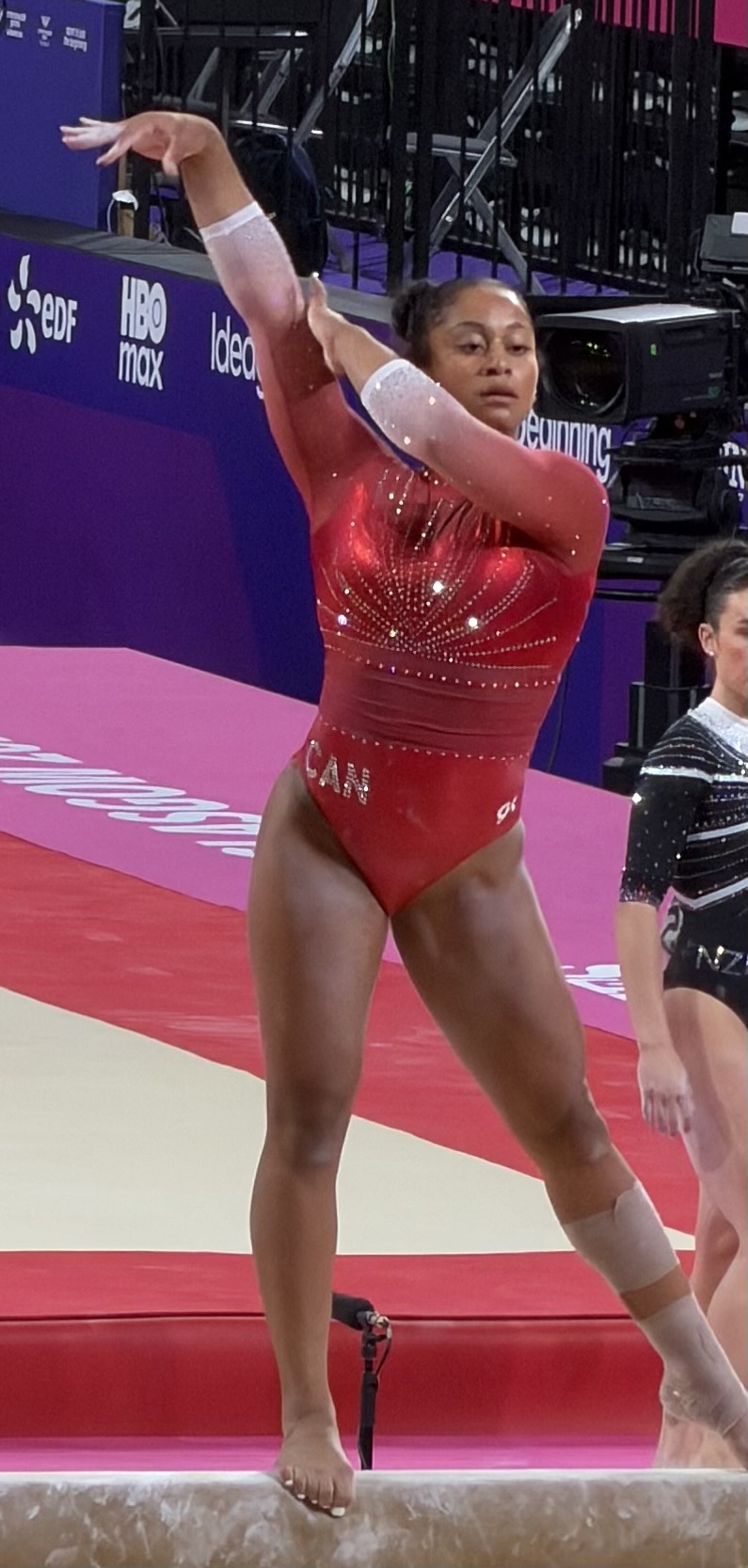
- Fontaine at the 2026 Commonwealth Games

Personal information
- Born: September 27, 2009 (age 17) Salaberry-de-Valleyfield, Quebec, Canada

Gymnastics career
- Country represented: Canada; (2023–present)
- Club: WimGym
Medal record
Women's artistic gymnastics
Representing Canada
World Championships
Silver medal – second place	2025 Jakarta	Vault
Commonwealth Games
Gold medal – first place	2026 Glasgow	Vault
Silver medal – second place	2026 Glasgow	Team
Bronze medal – third place	2026 Glasgow	All-around
Bronze medal – third place	2026 Glasgow	Balance beam
Pan American Championships
Gold medal – first place	2025 Panama City	Floor exercise
Silver medal – second place	2025 Panama City	Team
Silver medal – second place	2025 Panama City	All-around
Silver medal – second place	2025 Panama City	Vault
Silver medal – second place	2026 Rio de Janeiro	Vault
Bronze medal – third place	2025 Panama City	Uneven bars
Bronze medal – third place	2026 Rio de Janeiro	Team

Lia-Monica Fontaine (born September 27, 2009) is a Canadian artistic gymnast. She is the 2025 World silver medallist and 2026 Commonwealth Games champion on vault and the 2025 Pan American champion on floor exercise.

== Junior gymnastics career ==
=== 2023 ===
Fontaine competed at the 2023 DTB Pokal Team Challenge and helped Canada win the team silver. Individually she won silver on vault. In May, she then competed at the Canadian Junior Championships and won gold in the all-around, vault, and floor exercise, and bronze on balance beam.

=== 2024 ===
Fontaine competed at the 2024 City of Jesolo Trophy where she helped Canada win the team bronze. Individually she won bronze on uneven bars. In May, she competed at the 2024 Pan American Championships, where she helped Canada win team silver. She also won gold in the individual all-around, and vault, and bronze on uneven bars and balance beam. In June, she competed at the Canadian Junior Championships and won gold in the all-around, vault, balance beam and floor, and silver on uneven bars.

== Senior gymnastics career ==
=== 2025 ===
Fontaine made her senior national team debut at the 2025 City of Jesolo Trophy where she won silver on vault. In June, she competed at the Canadian Championships and won gold in the all-around, vault and floor exercise, and silver on uneven bars and balance beam. She was then selected to compete at the 2025 Pan American Championships. During the Pan American Championships, she helped Canada win team silver. During the event finals, she won gold on floor exercise, silver in the all-around and vault, and bronze on uneven bars.

Fontaine made her World Championships debut at the 2025 World Gymnastics Championships. At the World Championships, she qualified in third place for the vault final with a score of 14.099. During the event finals, she won a silver medal on vault with a score of 14.033 points. She became the second Canadian woman to win a World medal on the apparatus after Shallon Olsen in 2018.

=== 2026 ===
In February 2026, Fontaine participated in Elite Canada, competing on uneven bars and balance beam and winning the gold medal in the former. At International Gymnix in March, she contributed to the Canada 1 team's gold-medal finish. Individually, she secured a podium finish on all five events, including gold in the all-around as well as on vault and floor exercise. In April, she competed at the Osijek World Cup, her first World Cup event. She qualified for the vault and floor exercise finals, finishing in second place in both. Fontaine repeated as the Canadian Senior Women's All-Around Champion in June of 2026. She retained her national titles on vault and floor exercise as well.

At the 2026 Pan American Championships, Fontaine competed for Canada alongside teammates Lia Redick, Gabrielle Black, Alyssa Guerrier-Calixte, and Aurélie Tran. The Canadian team won bronze behind the United States and Brazil. Fontaine qualified for the individual all-around final, where she finished fifth and was the top Canadian finisher. She also qualified for and competed in the vault final, where she won the silver medal behind Rebeca Andrade of Brazil and ahead of Claire Pease of the United States.

On July 3, 2026, she was selected to represent Canada at the 2026 Commonwealth Games. During the team competition she helped Canada win a silver medal. Individually, she advanced to the all-around, vault and balance beam event finals. During the first day of event finals she won a gold medal on vault with a score of 14.000. The next day she won a bronze medal on balance beam with a score of 13.000 and finished fifth on floor exercise with a score of 13.100.

In September 2026, she was named to the Canadian team for the 2026 World Championships. Canada finished in eighth place in the team event. Individually, she qualified for the vault and floor exercise event finals where she finished fourth and sixth respectively.

== Competitive history ==
Competitive history of Lia-Monica Fontaine at the junior level
Year	Event	Team	AA	VT	UB	BB	FX
2022	Canadian Championships		1st place, gold medalist(s)	1st place, gold medalist(s)		3rd place, bronze medalist(s)	1st place, gold medalist(s)
2023	DTB Pokal Team Challenge	2nd place, silver medalist(s)		2nd place, silver medalist(s)			
2023	Canadian Championships		1st place, gold medalist(s)	1st place, gold medalist(s)			1st place, gold medalist(s)
2024	City of Jesolo Trophy	3rd place, bronze medalist(s)			3rd place, bronze medalist(s)		
2024	Pan American Championships	2nd place, silver medalist(s)	1st place, gold medalist(s)	1st place, gold medalist(s)	3rd place, bronze medalist(s)	3rd place, bronze medalist(s)	
2024	Canadian Championships		1st place, gold medalist(s)	1st place, gold medalist(s)	2nd place, silver medalist(s)	1st place, gold medalist(s)	1st place, gold medalist(s)

Competitive history of Lia-Monica Fontaine at the senior level
Year	Event	Team	AA	VT	UB	BB	FX
2025	City of Jesolo Trophy			2nd place, silver medalist(s)			
2025	Canadian Championships		1st place, gold medalist(s)	1st place, gold medalist(s)	2nd place, silver medalist(s)	2nd place, silver medalist(s)	1st place, gold medalist(s)
2025	Pan American Championships	2nd place, silver medalist(s)	2nd place, silver medalist(s)	2nd place, silver medalist(s)	3rd place, bronze medalist(s)	7	1st place, gold medalist(s)
2025	World Championships	—N/a		2nd place, silver medalist(s)			
2026
2026	Elite Canada				1st place, gold medalist(s)		
2026	International Gymnix	1st place, gold medalist(s)	1st place, gold medalist(s)	1st place, gold medalist(s)	2nd place, silver medalist(s)	2nd place, silver medalist(s)	1st place, gold medalist(s)
2026	Osijek World Cup			2nd place, silver medalist(s)			2nd place, silver medalist(s)
2026	Canadian Championships		1st place, gold medalist(s)	1st place, gold medalist(s)	3rd place, bronze medalist(s)	2nd place, silver medalist(s)	1st place, gold medalist(s)
2026	Pan American Championships	3rd place, bronze medalist(s)	5	2nd place, silver medalist(s)			
2026	Commonwealth Games	2nd place, silver medalist(s)	3rd place, bronze medalist(s)	1st place, gold medalist(s)		3rd place, bronze medalist(s)	5
2026	World Championships	8		4			6
