= 2025 DTB Pokal Stuttgart =

Artistic gymnastics competition

EnBW DTB Pokal 2025
- Venue: Porsche-Arena
- Location: Stuttgart, Germany
- Dates: March 27–30, 2025

The 2025 EnBW DTB Pokal Team Challenge and Mixed Cup was an artistic gymnastics competition held from March 27–30, 2025 at the Porsche-Arena in Stuttgart, Germany. The event consisted of five separate competitions across three days: a team challenge competition for both senior men and women; a team challenge for junior men and women; and a mixed team cup which will was contested between mixed gender senior teams from Canada, Germany, the Netherlands, and the United States.

== Schedule ==
Date	Session	Time
Thursday, March 27	Team Challenge Men	14:45–22:00
Friday, March 28	Junior Team Challenge Men	10:00–16:30
Friday, March 28	Team Challenge Women	19:00–22:00
Saturday March 29	Junior Team Challenge Women	14:00–17:00
Saturday March 29	Mixed Cup	19:00–22:00
Sunday, March 30	Apparatus Finals; Men's floor, pommel horse, and rings Women's vault and uneven bars	10:00–12:15
Sunday, March 30	Apparatus Finals; Men's vault, parallel bars, and horizontal bar Women's balance beam and floor	15:00–17:45

== Medalists ==
=== Senior ===
Event	Gold	Silver	Bronze
Team Challenge
Men
Team	(Japan) Japan; Ryosuke Doi; Kazuma Kaya; Takumi Onishima; Wataru Tanigawa; Tomoharu Tsunogai	(United States) United States; Taylor Christopulos; Jun Iwai; Riley Loos; Kiran Mandava; Kai Uemura	Italy; Yumin Abbadini; Lorenzo Bonicelli; Lorenzo Minh Casali; Edoardo de Rosa; Niccolo Vannucchi
Floor Exercise	(Israel) Artem Dolgopyat	(Italy) Lorenzo Minh Casali	(United States) Jun Iwai
Pommel Horse	(Kazakhstan) Zeinolla Idrissov	(Italy) Edoardo de Rosa	(Japan) Ryosuke Doi
Rings	(Japan) Wataru Tanigawa	(United States) Riley Loos	(Italy) Lorenzo Minh Casali
Vault	(Japan) Wataru Tanigawa	(Switzerland) Luca Murabito	(Australia) James Hardy
Parallel Bars	(Japan) Tomoharu Tsunogai	(Netherlands) Jermain Grünberg	(Belgium) Nicola Cuyle
Horizontal Bar	(Italy) Yumin Abbadini	(United States) Jun Iwai	(Belgium) Victor Martinez
Women
Team	(Spain) Spain; Marina Escudero; Laia Font; Laia Masferrer; Alba Petisco; Carlota Salas	(Canada) Canada; Gabrielle Black; Lia Redick; Rose Woo	(United Kingdom) Great Britain; Shantae-Eve Amankwaah; Grace Davies; Ema Kandalova; Frances Stone; Tilly Wright
Vault	(Canada) Gabrielle Black	(Belgium) Lisa Vaelen	(Spain) Laia Font
Uneven Bars	(Canada) Rose Woo	(Australia) Lucy Stewart	(Belgium) Nina Derwael
Balance Beam	(Belgium) Nina Derwael	(Germany) Silja Stöhr	(United Kingdom) Ema Kandalova
Floor Exercise	(Israel) Yali Shoshani	(Belgium) Lisa Vaelen	(Canada) Gabrielle Black
Mixed Cup
Team	(United States) United States; Nola Matthews; Simone Rose; Ashlee Sullivan; Riley Loos; Kiran Mandava; Alex Nitache	(Germany) Germany; Janoah Müller; Karina Schönmaier; Silja Stöhr; Nils Dunkel; Timo Eder; Alexander Kunz	(Canada) Canada; Gabrielle Black; Lia Redick; Rose Woo; Kai Iwaasa; Chris Kaji

=== Junior ===
Event	Gold	Silver	Bronze
Boys
Team	(China) China; Ji Xinghui; Long Houcheng; Wang Chengcheng; Yang Lanbin; Zhao Ruiyang	(United States) United States; Nartey Brady; Maksim Kan; Danila Leykin; Dante Reive; Nathan Roman	(United Kingdom) Great Britain; George Atkins; Uzair Chowdhury; Jude Irons; Evan McPhillips; Sol Scott
Floor Exercise	(Kazakhstan) Nurtan Idrissov	(France) Antonin Delaye	(United States) Nathan Roman
Pommel Horse	(China) Wang Chengcheng	(United Kingdom) Scott Sol	(Kazakhstan) Roman Khegay
Rings	(United States) Dante Reive	(Spain) Gabriel Barris	(Netherlands) Jayden Paton
Vault	(Kazakhstan) Nurtan Idrissov	(United Kingdom) Scott Sol	(Netherlands) Jayden Paton
Parallel Bars	(United Kingdom) Uzair Chowdhury	(China) Yang Lanbin	(United States) Danila Leykin
Horizontal Bar	(United States) Danila Leykin	(Israel) Ron Ortal	(United Kingdom) George Atkins
Girls
Team	(China) China; Chen Ziyan; Nian Shiyan; Qin Ziyue; Xie Guying; Yu Wenjing	(Germany) Germany; Anni Bantel; Lucia Bracka; Madita Mayr; Frederika Suhl; Luna Zimmermann	(Belgium) Belgium; Zélia Caufriez; Mie de Wilde; Camille Galand; Fleur Leeman; Aziza Oeyen
Vault	(Germany) Madita Mayr	(Belgium) Camille Galand	(United Kingdom) Jenitha Johnson
Uneven Bars	(China) Xie Guying	(Germany) Anni Bantel	(Spain) Susana Martinez
Balance Beam	(China) Yu Wenjing	(Belgium) Camille Galand	(Spain) Lucia Gutierrez
Floor Exercise	(China) Qin Ziyue	(Germany) Frederika Suhl	(Belgium) Camille Galand
