= Abigail Martin (gymnast) =

British artistic gymnast

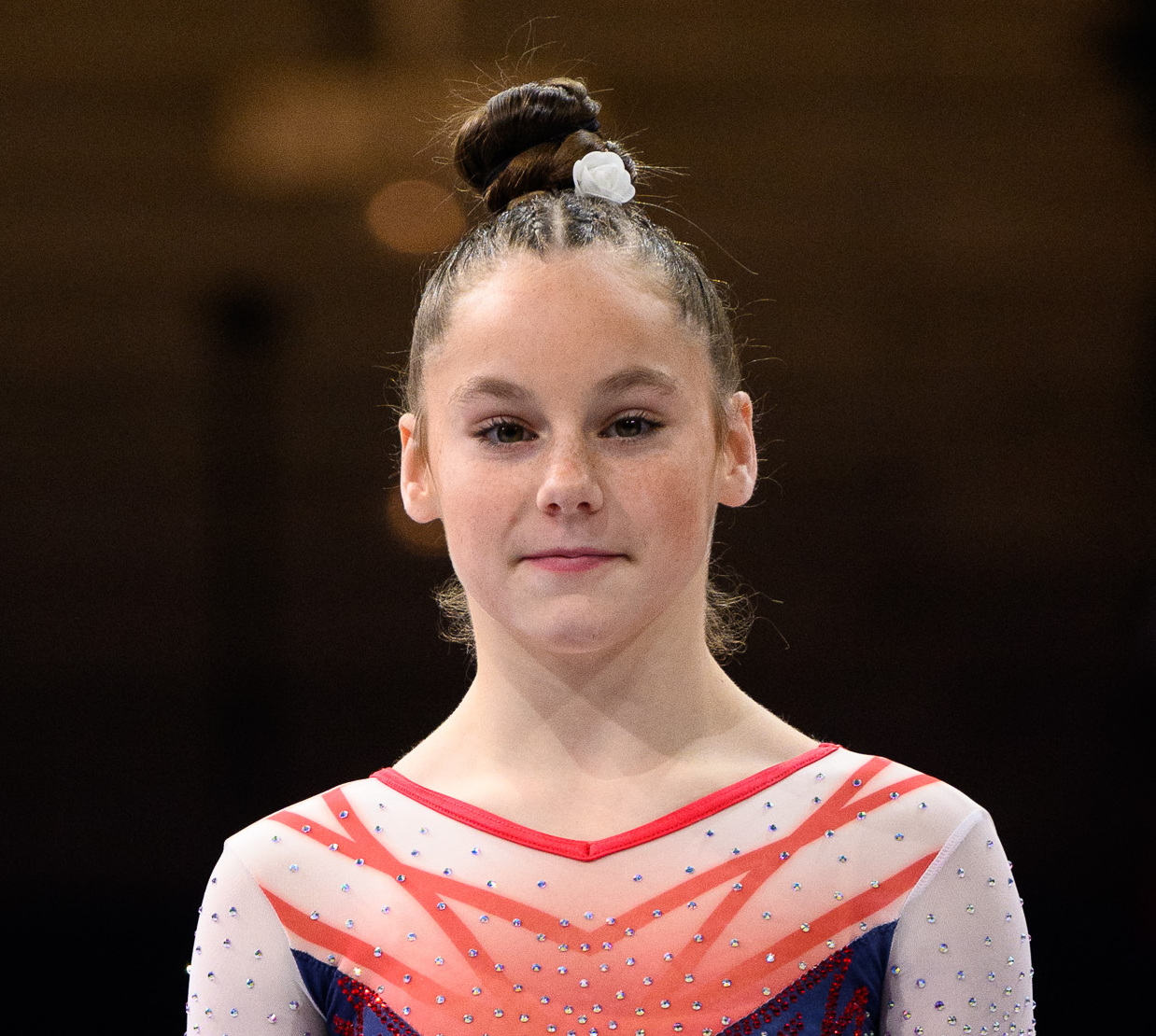
- Martin at the 2022 European Championships

Personal information
- Full name: Abigail Anne Martin
- Nickname: Abi
- Born: 19 April 2008 (age 18) Paignton, England

Gymnastics career
- Discipline: Women's artistic gymnastics
- Country represented: (United Kingdom) Great Britain England; (2022–present)
- Club: South Devon School of Gymnastics
- Head coach: Rachel Wignall
Medal record
Women's artistic gymnastics
Representing Great Britain
World Championships
Bronze medal – third place	2025 Jakarta	Floor exercise
European Championships
Silver medal – second place	2024 Rimini	Team
FIG World Cup
Event	1st	2nd	3rd
World Challenge Cup	1	0	1
Total	1	0	1
Representing England
Commonwealth Games
Silver medal – second place	2026 Glasgow	Vault
Silver medal – second place	2026 Glasgow	Floor exercise
Bronze medal – third place	2026 Glasgow	Team

Abigail "Abi" Martin (born 19 April 2008) is a British artistic gymnast and women's national team member. She represented Great Britain at the 2024 Olympic Games and was part of the team that won silver at the 2024 European Championships. Individually she is the 2025 World Championships bronze medallist on floor exercise.

== Early life ==
Abi Martin was born in Torquay in 2008. She began gymnastics at age five.

== Junior gymnastics career ==
=== 2022 ===
Martin competed at the 2022 DTB Pokal Team Challenge in Stuttgart where she helped the British team finish sixth. Individually she finished fifth on floor exercise. In July she competed at the 2022 European Youth Olympic Festival where she helped Great Britain finish sixth. The following month Martin competed at the European Championships where she helped Great Britain finish fourth. Individually she placed sixth in the all-around.

=== 2023 ===
Martin competed at the 2023 Junior World Championships alongside Jemima Taylor and Ema Kandalova. Individually she placed fifth in the all-around and on vault and fourth on floor exercise.

== Senior gymnastics career ==
=== 2024 ===
Martin became age-eligible for senior competition in 2024. At the British Championships she placed third in the all-around behind Ondine Achampong and Ruby Evans. Early in the year she competed at the Cottbus World Cup and the Osijek World Challenge Cup. She qualified to the vault and floor exercise event finals at both competitions; she won bronze on floor exercise in Osijek.

Martin was originally named as a reserve athlete for the European Championships team; however Achampong later withdrew due to an ACL tear and Martin was added to the team. While there she helped the British team finish second behind Italy. Individually she qualified to the floor exercise final where she finished seventh.

In June Martin was selected to represent Great Britain at the 2024 Summer Olympics alongside Becky Downie, Ruby Evans, Georgia-Mae Fenton, and Alice Kinsella. During qualifications at the Olympic Games, Martin helped Great Britain qualify to the team final. During the team final Martin competed on floor exercise, scoring 13.466 towards Great Britain's fourth-place finish.

=== 2025 ===
Martin made her return to competition following the Olympics in September 2025 when she was selected to compete at the 2025 Paris World Challenge Cup. She qualified for the vault and floor exercise finals, winning gold on vault. Later that month she was selected to represent Great Britain at the 2025 World Championships alongside Ruby Evans, Alia Leat, and Shantae-Eve Amankwaah. She qualified for the all-around final, where she finished 8th, and the floor exercise final, where she won her first world medal, a bronze. She was joined on the podium by teammate Ruby Evans, who took silver.

In November 2025, she competed at the Memorial Arthur Gander tournament where she placed second.

=== 2026 ===
Martin at the 2026 World Championships

Martin attended English Championships where she won gold in the all-around competition, on vault and floor exercise, as well as bronze on the uneven bars and balance beam. She was selected to represent Great Britain at the 2026 American Cup alongside Emily Roper, Ruby Stacey, Oakley Banks, Sam Mostowfi and Sol Scott. The team placed fifth overall. In June, Martin was announced as part of the English team at the 2026 Commonwealth Games, alongside Alia Leat, Taeja James (later replaced by Shanna-Kae Grant), Ruby Stacey and Shantae-Eve Amankwaah. Martin helped the team win bronze and also qualified for the all-around, vault and floor exercise finals. She won silver on vault and floor exercise and finished 11th in the all-around.

Martin was selected to represent Great Britain at the 2026 World Championships alongside Ruby Evans, Alice Kinsella, Becky Downie, Leat, and alternate Amankwaah.

== Competitive history ==
Competitive history of Abigail Martin at the junior level
Year	Event	Team	AA	VT	UB	BB	FX
2022	Welsh Championships (guest)		5				
2022	English Championships		4				
2022	DTB Pokal Team Challenge	6					5
2022	British Championships		2nd place, silver medalist(s)	4	3rd place, bronze medalist(s)	3rd place, bronze medalist(s)	2nd place, silver medalist(s)
2022	European Youth Olympic Festival	6	18				4
2022	European Championships	4	6		7	8	
2023	English Championships		1st place, gold medalist(s)	1st place, gold medalist(s)	3rd place, bronze medalist(s)	3rd place, bronze medalist(s)	1st place, gold medalist(s)
2023	Welsh Championships (guest)		1st place, gold medalist(s)	1st place, gold medalist(s)	1st place, gold medalist(s)	2nd place, silver medalist(s)	
2023	British Championships		1st place, gold medalist(s)				
2023	Junior World Championships	4	5	5			4
2023	Rushmoor Rose Bowl		1st place, gold medalist(s)	3rd place, bronze medalist(s)		7	9
2023	TopGym Tournament	3rd place, bronze medalist(s)	4	1st place, gold medalist(s)			5

Competitive history of Abigail Martin at the senior level
Year	Event	Team	AA	VT	UB	BB	FX
2024	Welsh Championships (guest)		3rd place, bronze medalist(s)				
2024	Cottbus World Cup			8			4
2024	English Championships		5	1			2nd place, silver medalist(s)
2024	British Championships		3rd place, bronze medalist(s)	2nd place, silver medalist(s)	5	3rd place, bronze medalist(s)	6
2024	Osijek Challenge Cup			4			3rd place, bronze medalist(s)
2024	European Championships	2nd place, silver medalist(s)					7
2024	Olympic Games	4					
2025	Paris World Challenge Cup			1st place, gold medalist(s)			6
2025	World Championships	—N/a	8				3rd place, bronze medalist(s)
2025	Arthur Gander Memorial		2nd place, silver medalist(s)				
2026	English Championships		1st place, gold medalist(s)	1st place, gold medalist(s)	3rd place, bronze medalist(s)	3rd place, bronze medalist(s)	1st place, gold medalist(s)
2026	American Cup	5					
2026	British Championships		9	1st place, gold medalist(s)		6	2nd place, silver medalist(s)
2026	Commonwealth Games	3rd place, bronze medalist(s)	11	2nd place, silver medalist(s)			2nd place, silver medalist(s)
2026	European Championships	4	7	4			7
2026	World Championships	R1	18	8			4
