= Alyssa Guerrier-Calixte =

Canadian artistic gymnast (born 2009)

- Born: 2009 (age 16–17)

Gymnastics career
- Country represented: Canada
- College team: Georgia GymDogs (2028–2031)
- Club: WimGym
Medal record
Women's artistic gymnastics
Representing Canada
Commonwealth Games
| Silver medal – second place | 2026 Glasgow | Team |
Pan American Championships
| Silver medal – second place | 2025 Panama City | Team |
| Bronze medal – third place | 2026 Rio de Janeiro | Team |

Alyssa Guerrier-Calixte (born 2009) is Canadian artistic gymnast. She was part of the silver medal-winning Canadian team at the 2026 Commonwealth Games. She is also a two-time team medalist for Canada at the Pan American Championships.

== Junior career ==
Guerrier-Calixte received her first medal at the national level at the 2022 Canadian Championships, where she won the bronze medal on vault in the novice category.

In 2023, she made her international debut at the 2023 Tournoi International in Combs-la-Ville, France. She placed tenth in the all-around.

At the 2024 City of Jesolo Trophy, Guerrier-Calixte won bronze as a member of the Canadian team and qualified for the floor exercise final, ultimately finishing seventh. The following month, she competed at the Junior Pan American Championships, winning the silver medal with Canada. Individually, she qualified for the floor final and finished in fifth place.

Guerrier-Calixte won the gold medal on floor at the 2024 Canadian Championships, in addition placing third on vault and fourth in the all-around at the junior level.

== Senior career ==
=== 2025 ===
Guerrier-Calixte competed at the 2025 International Gymnix in March, winning all-around bronze as well as two silver medals on balance beam and floor exercise. She was also part of the Canada 1 team, which won gold.

At the 2025 Pan American Championships, Guerrier-Calixte won silver for Canada in the team competition with teammates Lia Monica Fontaine, Gabrielle Black, Lia Redick, and Evandra Zlobec. She also finished sixth in the all-around.

In October, Guerrier-Calixte was named as an alternate for the Canadian team at the 2025 World Championships.

On November 30, 2025, Guerrier-Calixte announced her commitment to compete for the Georgia GymDogs in NCAA Gymnastics.

=== 2026 ===
In March 2026, Guerrier-Calixte competed as part of the Canadian team at the DTB Pokal Team Challenge, and Canada won the gold medal. Individually, she also won gold on balance beam.

Guerrier-Calixte competed for Canada at the 2026 Pan American Championships, where she won the bronze medal with teammates Aurélie Tran, Lia Monica Fontaine, Gabrielle Black, and Lia Redick.

The following month, Guerrier-Calixte was named to the Canadian team for the 2026 Commonwealth Games, with Fontaine, Redick, Gabrielle Black, and Ellie Black. They won the silver medal in the team competition behind Australia and ahead of England.

== Competitive history ==
Competitive history of Alyssa Guerrier-Calixte at the junior level
| Year | Event | Team | AA | VT | UB | BB | FX |
|---|---|---|---|---|---|---|---|
| 2020 | Elite Canada | | 5 | | | | |
| 2022 | Canadian Championships | | 8 | 3rd place, bronze medalist(s) | | | |
| 2023 | Elite Canada | | 9 | | | | |
| 2023 | Canadian Championships | | 8 | | | | |
| 2023 | Tournoi International | 7 | 10 | | | | |
| 2024 | Elite Canada | | 5 | | | 2nd place, silver medalist(s) | |
| 2024 | International Gymnix | 5 | 12 | 4 | | | 6 |
| 2024 | City of Jesolo Trophy | 3rd place, bronze medalist(s) | 15 | | | | 7 |
| 2024 | Pan American Championships | 2nd place, silver medalist(s) | 11 | | | | 5 |
| 2024 | Canadian Championships | | 4 | 3rd place, bronze medalist(s) | | | 1st place, gold medalist(s) |
| 2024 | Olympic Hopes Cup | 1st place, gold medalist(s) | 6 | | | 5 | |

Competitive history of Alyssa Guerrier-Calixte at the senior level
| Year | Event | Team | AA | VT | UB | BB | FX |
|---|---|---|---|---|---|---|---|
| 2025 | Elite Canada | | 3rd place, bronze medalist(s) | | | | 2nd place, silver medalist(s) |
| 2025 | International Gymnix | 1st place, gold medalist(s) | 3rd place, bronze medalist(s) | | | 2nd place, silver medalist(s) | 2nd place, silver medalist(s) |
| 2025 | City of Jesolo Trophy | 5 | | | | | 7 |
| 2025 | Canadian Championships | | 6 | | | | 2nd place, silver medalist(s) |
| 2025 | Pan American Championships | 2nd place, silver medalist(s) | | | | | |
2026
| 2026 | Elite Canada | | 3rd place, bronze medalist(s) | | | 1st place, gold medalist(s) | 3rd place, bronze medalist(s) |
| 2026 | International Gymnix | 1st place, gold medalist(s) | 8 | | | | |
| 2026 | DTB Pokal Team Challenge | 1st place, gold medalist(s) | | | | 1st place, gold medalist(s) | |
| 2026 | Canadian Championships | | | | | | |
| 2026 | Pan American Championships | 3rd place, bronze medalist(s) | | | | | |
| 2026 | Commonwealth Games | 2nd place, silver medalist(s) | | | | | |
