= Shantae-Eve Amankwaah =

English artistic gymnast (born 2009)

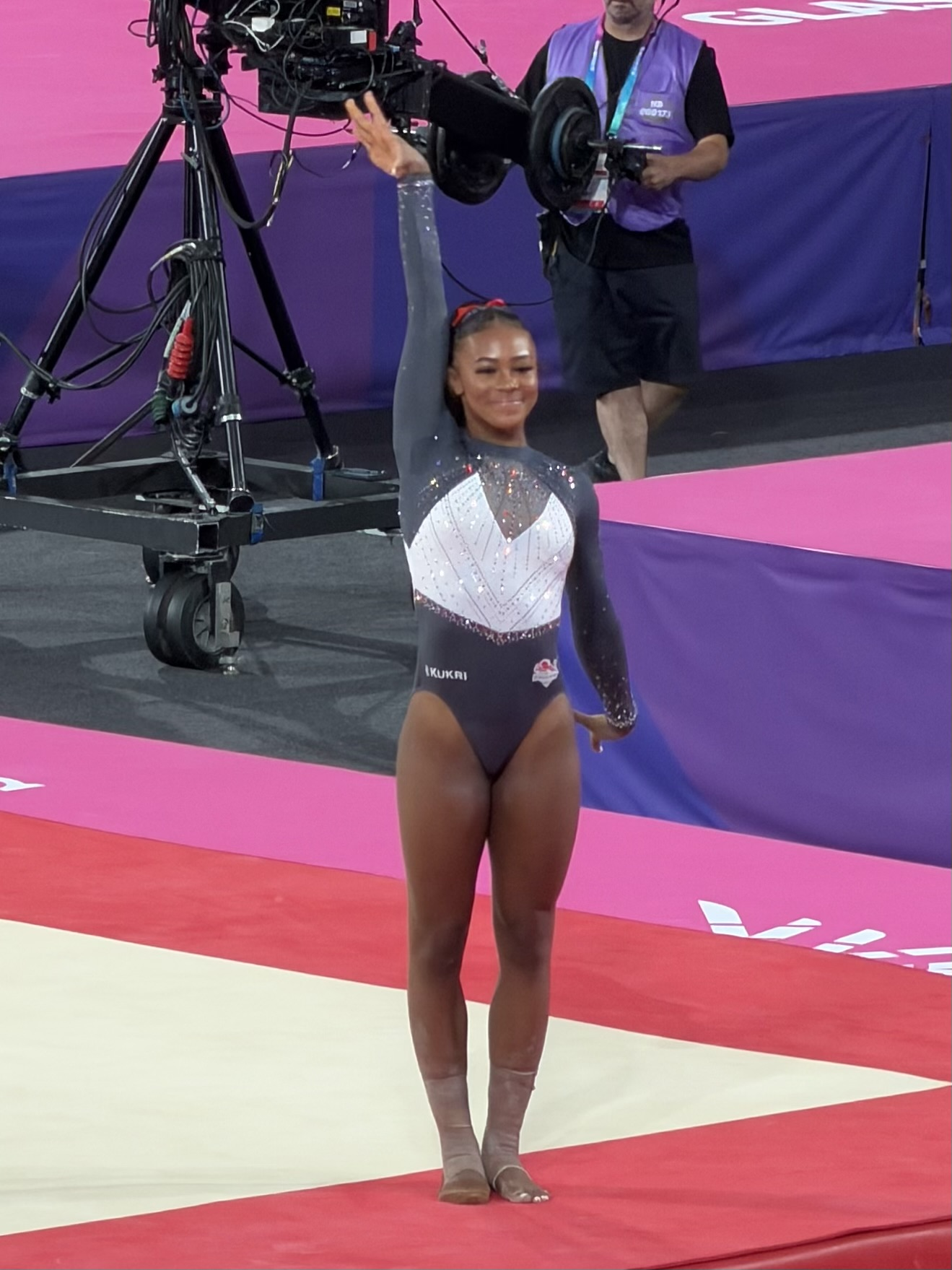
- Amankwaah at the 2026 Commonwealth Games

Personal information
- Full name: Shantae-Eve Asiedua Amankwaah
- Born: 11 March 2009 (age 17) Bristol, England
- Relatives: Kevin Amankwaah (father)

Gymnastics career
- Discipline: Women's artistic gymnastics
- Country represented: (United Kingdom) Great Britain England; (2025–present)
- Club: Bristol Hawks Gymnastics Club
Medal record
Women's artistic gymnastics
Representing Great Britain
FIG World Cup
Event / 1st / 2nd / 3rd; World Challenge Cup / 1 / 1 / 0
Representing England
Commonwealth Games
Bronze medal – third place	2026 Glasgow	Team
Bronze medal – third place	2026 Glasgow	Floor exercise

Shantae-Eve Asiedua Amankwaah (born 11 March 2009) is an English artistic gymnast and British national team member. She represented Great Britain at the 2025 World Championships and England at the 2026 Commonwealth Games where she won bronze in the team event and on floor exercise. Amankwaah is also the 2026 British bronze medalist in the all-around and silver medalist on uneven bars.

As a junior, she is the 2024 British all-around champion and represented Great Britain at the 2024 European Championships where she placed 5th in the team and in the all-around competition.

== Early life ==
Born in Bristol, Amankwaah is the daughter of former Bristol City footballer Kevin Amankwaah. She is of Ghanaian descent through her paternal grandparents.

== Junior gymnastics career ==
=== 2024 ===
Amankwaah won gold in the all-around, bars, beam and floor events at both the English and British Gymnastics Championships. She was selected to represent Great Britain at the 2024 European Championships alongside Jemima Taylor, Isabelle Priestley, Ellie Lewis and Tahlia Wyatt. The team placed 5th and individually Amankwaah placed 5th in the all-around competition, making the apparatus finals for vault, bars and floor.

== Senior gymnastics career ==
=== 2025 ===
At her first senior English Championships, Amankwaah won bronze on floor exercise. She qualified for the bars and beam apparatus finals at 2025 British Gymnastics Championships placing 5th and 6th respectively. Amankwaah was selected to represent Great Britain alongside Frances Stone, Ema Kandalova, Tilly Wright and Grace Davies at the 2025 DTB Pokal Team Challenge in Stuttgart where they won bronze. She next attended the Szombathely Challenge Cup where she competed on the uneven bars, balance beam and floor exercise.

Amankwaah was selected into the senior British national team. In late September she was selected to represent Great Britain at the 2025 World Championships alongside Ruby Evans, Alia Leat, and Abigail Martin.

=== 2026 ===
At English Championships, Amankwaah won silver in the all-around, taking gold on uneven bars and bronze on floor exercise. At British Championships, she competed in the all-around and won the bronze medal. Amankwaah also proceeded to the uneven bar and floor exercise finals, winning a silver medal on the uneven bars and placing 9th on floor. In May 2026 Amankwaah competed at the Varna Challenge Cup and earned her first senior international gold and silver medals on floor exercise and uneven bars respectively. In June, Amankwaah was announced as part of the English team at the 2026 Commonwealth Games, alongside Abigail Martin, Alia Leat, Taeja James (later replaced by Shanna-Kae Grant), and Ruby Stacey. She helped the team win bronze and qualified for the all-around, uneven bars and floor exercise finals. She won bronze on floor exercise and placed fourth and fifth in the all-around and on uneven bars finals respectively.

Amankwaah was selected as the traveling replacement athlete for the 2026 World Championships.

== Competitive history ==
Competitive history of Shantae-Eve Amankwaah at the junior level
Year	Event	Team	AA	VT	UB	BB	FX
2022	English Championships		1st place, gold medalist(s)		1st place, gold medalist(s)		
2022	British Championships		6				
2022	British Team Championships					2nd place, silver medalist(s)	3rd place, bronze medalist(s)
2022	Rushmoor Rosebowl	7	7		6		5
2023	English Championships		6				2nd place, silver medalist(s)
2023	British Championships		9			7	4
2023	British Team Championships				2nd place, silver medalist(s)		
2023	Rushmoor Rosebowl		3rd place, bronze medalist(s)		3rd place, bronze medalist(s)	6	2nd place, silver medalist(s)
2024	English Championships		1st place, gold medalist(s)		1st place, gold medalist(s)	1st place, gold medalist(s)	1st place, gold medalist(s)
2024	British Championships		1st place, gold medalist(s)		1st place, gold medalist(s)	1st place, gold medalist(s)	1st place, gold medalist(s)
2024	European Championships	5	5		6		6
2024	British Team Championships				2nd place, silver medalist(s)		
2024	Rushmoor Rosebowl		2nd place, silver medalist(s)			3rd place, bronze medalist(s)	

Competitive history of Shantae-Eve Amankwaah at the senior level
Year	Event	Team	AA	VT	UB	BB	FX
2025	English Championships						3rd place, bronze medalist(s)
2025	British Championships				5	6	
2025	DTB Pokal Team Challenge	3rd place, bronze medalist(s)					
2025	Szombathely Challenge Cup				10		15
2025	World Championships	—N/a			56		57
2026	English Championships		2nd place, silver medalist(s)		1st place, gold medalist(s)		3rd place, bronze medalist(s)
2026	British Championships		3rd place, bronze medalist(s)		2nd place, silver medalist(s)		9
2026	Varna Challenge Cup				2nd place, silver medalist(s)		1st place, gold medalist(s)
2026	Commonwealth Games	3rd place, bronze medalist(s)	4		5		3rd place, bronze medalist(s)
