= Courtney McGregor =

New Zealand artistic gymnast

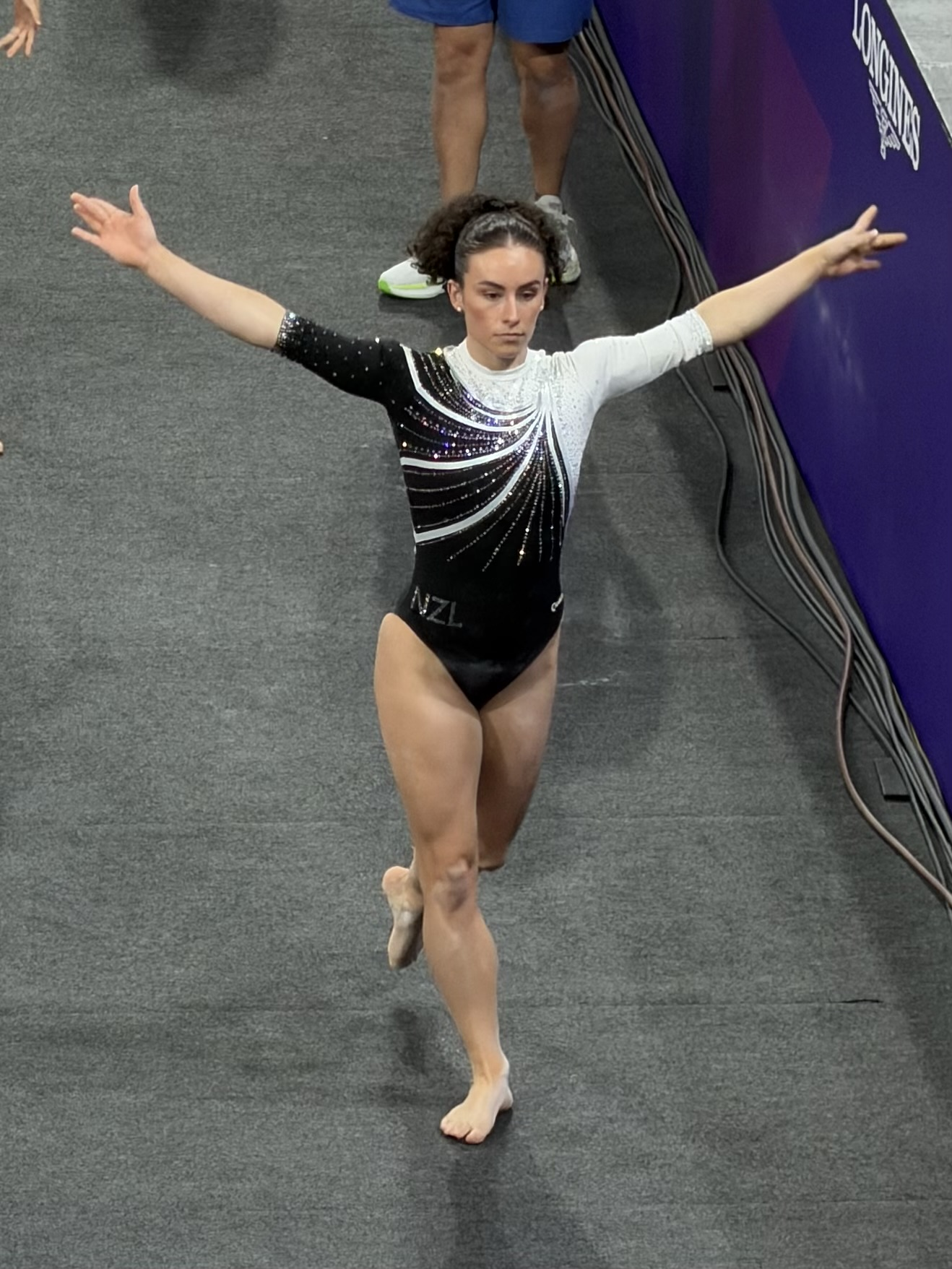
- McGregor at the 2026 Commonwealth Games

Personal information
- Full name: Courtney Louise McGregor
- Born: 17 November 1998 (age 27) Christchurch, New Zealand

Gymnastics career
- Discipline: Women's artistic gymnastics
- Country represented: New Zealand (2014–2019, 2025–present)
- Club: Christchurch School of Gymnastics
- Head coach: Mary Wright
Medal record
Representing New Zealand
Pacific Rim Championships
Silver medal – second place	2014 Richmond	Vault
Bronze medal – third place	2016 Everett	Vault

Courtney Louise McGregor (born 17 November 1998) is a New Zealand artistic gymnast. She competed at the 2016 Summer Olympics and retired in 2020 before returning to competition in 2025.

== Early life and education ==
McGregor was born in 1998 in Christchurch, where she lived until May 2016. Her parents are Tina and Russell McGregor. Of Māori descent, she is affiliated with the Ngāti Kahungunu iwi. She attended Villa Maria College and later switched to The Correspondence School.

== Gymnastics career ==
McGregor started gymnastics at age six. Her first international competitions were the 2012 Pacific Rim Gymnastics Championships in Everett, Washington, and the 2013 Australian Youth Olympic Festival in Sydney. She competed at the 2014 World Artistic Gymnastics Championships in Nanning, China, and also won a bronze medal in the vault at the 2016 Pacific Rim Gymnastics Championships.

She qualified for the Olympics at the 2016 Gymnastics Olympic Test Event (known as Aquece Rio 2016) in Rio de Janeiro. She was the first artistic gymnast to compete for New Zealand since Laura Robertson at the 2000 Summer Olympics in Sydney. At 17, McGregor was New Zealand's youngest Olympic competitor in 2016. She finished 41st in the all-around in qualifications, with a best placing of 13th on vault.

== College career ==
MacGregor accepted an athletic scholarship at Boise State University and enrolled there in May 2016 to study mathematics and philosophy. Her Christchurch-born coach, Mary Wright, continued to train her in Boise.

She won the 2019 all-around competition for the Mountain West Conference. She was forced to sit out the 2020 season after rupturing her Achilles tendon and subsequently announced her retirement from gymnastics.
