= Emma Yap =

Singaporean artistic gymnast (born 2005)

- Yap in at the 2019 Junior World Championships

Personal information
- Full name: Emma Ee-Lin Yap
- Born: January 30, 2005 (age 21) Singapore
- Relatives: Amanda Yap (sister)

Gymnastics career
- Country represented: Singapore
- Club: Friends of Gymnastics
- Head coaches: Zhang Zhen; Zhou Qun
Medal record
Representing Singapore
Women's artistic gymnastics
Southeast Asian Games
Silver medal – second place	2025 Thailand	Floor exercise
Bronze medal – third place	2021 Vietnam	Team

Emma Ee-Lin Yap (born January 30, 2005) is a Singaporean artistic gymnast. She was the 2025 Southeast Asian Games silver medalist on floor exercise. She represented Singapore at the 2019 Junior World Championships, as well as at the 2023 and 2025 World Championships.

== Early life ==
Yap began gymnastics in 2007 at the age of two, after taking a mother-daughter class. Her younger sister, Amanda Yap, is also an elite gymnast, and Emma grew up helping Amanda develop her skills.

== Junior career ==
=== 2018-2019 ===
Yap received her first accolades as a junior gymnast at the 2018 Singapore Championships, where she won the bronze medal in the all-around. She made her international debut the following month at the Asian Junior Championships. In addition to contributing to Singapore's sixth-place finish as a team, she placed 14th on uneven bars.

In June of 2019, Yap won the all-around silver medal at the Asian Junior Cup. At the same competition, she won silver on balance beam and bronze on uneven bars.

A few weeks later, Yap competed at the inaugural Junior World Championships in Győr, Hungary, alongside teammates Kaitlyn Lim and Rachel Anne Liew. Singapore placed 29th as a team. Individually, Yap finished 95th in the all-around and 63rd on balance beam.

Vault

Uneven Bars

Balance Beam

Floor Exercise

Yap at the 2019 Junior World Championships

== Senior career ==
=== 2022 ===
At the 2022 Singapore Championships, Yap's first major competition as a senior gymnast, she became the National Balance Beam Champion. She also won silver on vault as well as bronze on uneven bars and in the all-around.

Yap was apart of the bronze-medal winning Singaporean team at the 2021 Southeast Asian Games, held in 2022. She competed in the all-around, placing ninth, and qualified for the balance beam final, finishing seventh. She was also selected to compete at the 2022 Commonwealth Games in Birmingham. Team Singapore achieved a seventh-place finish, and Yap qualified for the all-around final, where she placed 15th.

=== 2023 ===
Yap began the 2023 season at the Singapore Championships, where she once again won the gold medal on balance beam, in addition to bronze on uneven bars and in the all-around. She next competed at the Asian Championships, where she placed 14th in the individual all-around. This allowed Yap to qualify for the 2023 World Championships, her first senior competition on the world stage, alongside teammate Nadine Joy Nathan.

With Nathan, Kaitlyn Lim, and Shandy Poh, Yap competed for Singapore at the 2022 Asian Games. The Singaporean team placed seventh, and Yap had to leave to prepare for the World Championships directly after the qualification round.

At the World Championships, Yap performed routines on all four events, placing 92nd in the all-around. Her best individual apparatus result was 71st on balance beam.

=== 2025 ===
After not competing in 2024, Yap returned to competition at the 2025 Singapore Championships. She won the silver medal in the all-around and picked up her first national title on floor exercise, in addition to winning bronze on balance beam.

Yap helped the Singaporean team place seventh at the 2025 Asian Championships. Individually, she finished 10th in the all-around and was second reserve for the floor exercise final.

In October, Yap competed at the 2025 World Championships with Amanda Yap, Emma Goh, and Alena Tan. She greatly improved her all-around and balance beam rankings from the 2023 World Championships, finishing 61st and 24th, respectively.

Yap concluded 2025 at the Southeast Asian Games in December. She won the silver medal on floor exercise, marking Singapore's first SEA Games medal on the event since 2011.

=== 2026 ===
With Amanda Yap, Alena Tan, Emma Goh, and Charlotte Phoon, Yap contributed to Singapore's seventh-place finish at the 2026 Commonwealth Games. She was also second reserve for the floor exercise final.

In September, Yap participated in her second Asian Games. She and her sister Amanda, along with teammates Goh, Tan, and Colleen Hong, qualified Singapore for the team final, where they ultimately finished eighth. Individually, Yap placed 13th in the all-around.

== Competitive history ==
Competitive history of Emma Yap at the junior level
Year	Event	Team	AA	VT	UB	BB	FX
2018	Singapore Championships		3rd place, bronze medalist(s)		6	7	6
2018	Asian Junior Championships	6					
2018	Singapore Open		1st place, gold medalist(s)	3rd place, bronze medalist(s)		1st place, gold medalist(s)	2nd place, silver medalist(s)
2019	Singapore Open		1st place, gold medalist(s)		1st place, gold medalist(s)	2nd place, silver medalist(s)	
2019	Asian Junior Cup		2nd place, silver medalist(s)		3rd place, bronze medalist(s)	2nd place, silver medalist(s)	
2019	Junior World Championships	29	95		82	63	104

Competitive history of Emma Yap at the senior level
Year	Event	Team	AA	VT	UB	BB	FX
2022	Singapore Championships		3rd place, bronze medalist(s)	2nd place, silver medalist(s)	5	3rd place, bronze medalist(s)	1st place, gold medalist(s)
2022	Southeast Asian Games	3rd place, bronze medalist(s)	9			7	
2022	Singapore Open		3rd place, bronze medalist(s)		3rd place, bronze medalist(s)	6	5
2022	Commonwealth Games	7	15				
2023	Singapore Championships		3rd place, bronze medalist(s)		3rd place, bronze medalist(s)	4	1st place, gold medalist(s)
2023	Singapore Open		3rd place, bronze medalist(s)	3rd place, bronze medalist(s)	4		2nd place, silver medalist(s)
2023	Asian Championships	6	14				
2023	Asian Games	7					
2023	World Championships		92		135	71	109
2025	Singapore Championships		2nd place, silver medalist(s)			3rd place, bronze medalist(s)	1st place, gold medalist(s)
2025	Singapore Open					2nd place, silver medalist(s)	
2025	Asian Championships	7	10				R2
2025	World Championships	—N/a	61		99	24	100
2025	Southeast Asian Games						2nd place, silver medalist(s)
2026	Singapore Open		1st place, gold medalist(s)		2nd place, silver medalist(s)	1st place, gold medalist(s)	1st place, gold medalist(s)
2026	Commonwealth Games	7					
2026	Asian Games	8	13				R2
