= Amanda Yap =

Singaporean artistic gymnast (born 2009)

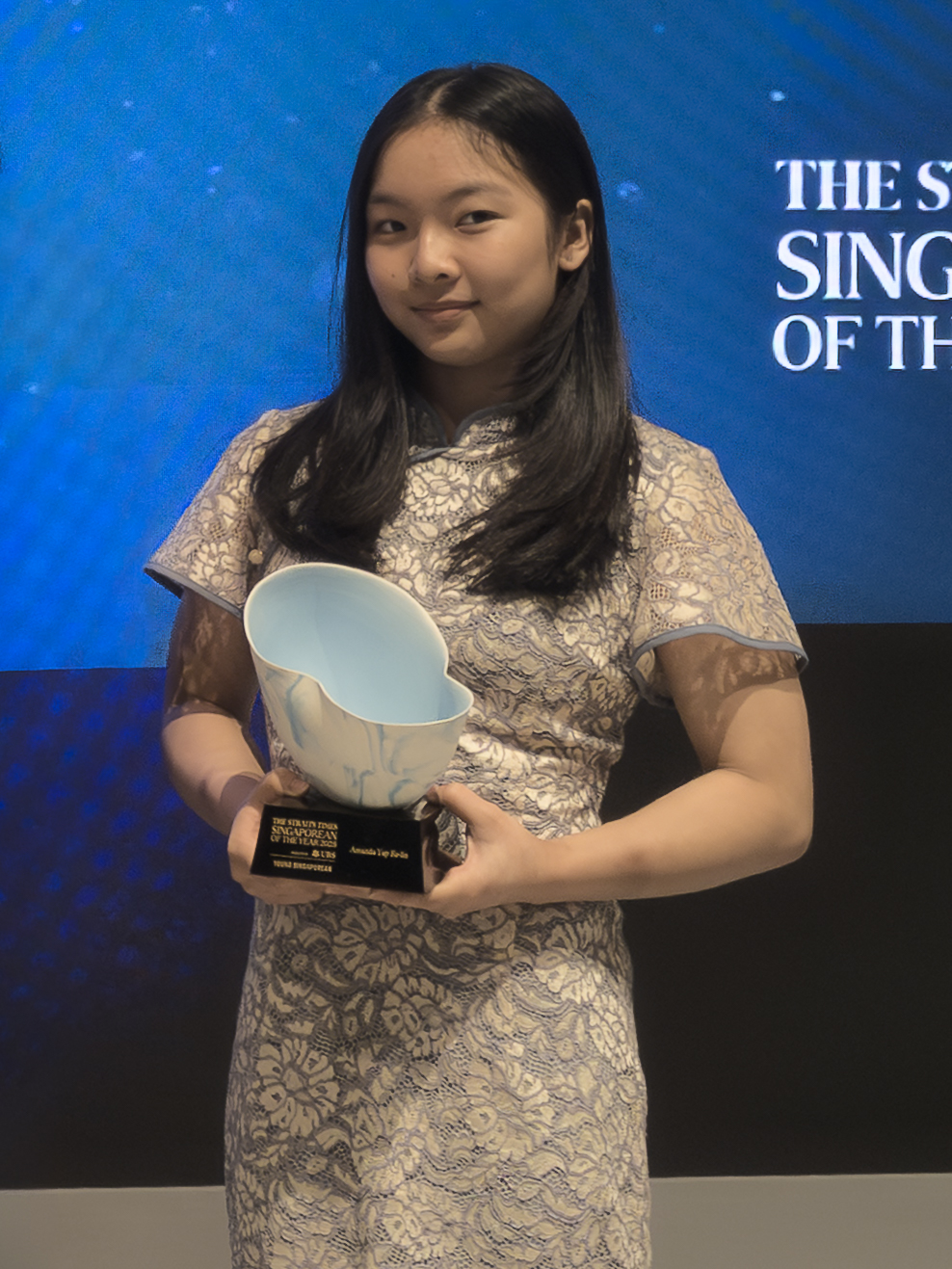
- Yap in 2026

Personal information
- Full name: Amanda Ee-Lin Yap
- Born: 3 November 2009 (age 16) Singapore
- Relatives: Emma Yap (sister)

Gymnastics career
- Country represented: Singapore
Medal record
Representing Singapore
Women's artistic gymnastics
Commonwealth Games
Silver medal – second place	2026 Glasgow	Balance beam
Southeast Asian Games
Silver medal – second place	2025 Thailand	Balance beam
Junior Asian Championships
Silver medal – second place	2024 Tashkent	Balance beam

Amanda Ee-Lin Yap (born 3 November 2009) is a Singaporean artistic gymnast. She qualified for the balance beam final at the 2025 World Championships, becoming Singapore's first World Artistic Gymnastics Championships finalist. She is the 2025 Singaporean all-around champion and the 2024 Singaporean junior all-around champion.

== Gymnastics career ==
Yap began training with the Singapore national team in 2022.

Yap won the junior all-around title at the 2024 Singapore Championships. At the 2024 Junior Asian Championships, Yap placed ninth in the balance beam qualifications but advanced into the final due to the two-per-country rule. She went on to win the silver medal in the final. She also placed eighth in the floor exercise final, seventh in the all-around, and fourth in the team competition.

Yap became age-eligible for senior competitions in 2025 and won the senior all-around title at the 2025 Singapore Championships. She then made her senior international debut at the Asian Championships and placed 15th in the all-around. She made her World Championships debut in Jakarta and advanced to the balance beam final in seventh place with a score of 13.300. This made her the first-ever gymnast from Singapore to advance into a World Championships final. In between the qualifications and the final, Yap flew back to Singapore to take her O-Level exams. She went on to place sixth in the final with a personal-best score of 13.333.

In December 2025, Yap represented Singapore at the Southeast Asian Games. She competed on balance beam and won the silver medal on the event, alongside her sister Emma who won silver in the floor event.

On 19 March 2026, Yap received the inaugural Young Singaporean of the Year award from The Straits Times for the year 2025.

Yap competed at the 2026 Asian Championships in June 2026. She finished thirteenth in the all-around and qualified for the balance beam and floor exercise finals, in which she placed sixth and fifth, respectively. Her performance at Asian Championships allowed her to secure an individual all-around spot at the 2026 World Championships.

At the 2026 Commonwealth Games, Yap won the silver medal in the balance beam final. This tied Singapore's best-ever finish in gymnastics at the Commonwealth Games, matching Lim Heem Wei's silver medal in the same event in 2010. It was also Singapore's first medal in any sport at the 2026 games.

== Personal life ==
As of 2025, Yap is a student at the Methodist Girls’ School. Her older sister, Emma Yap, also competes for Singapore's national gymnastics team.

== Competitive history ==
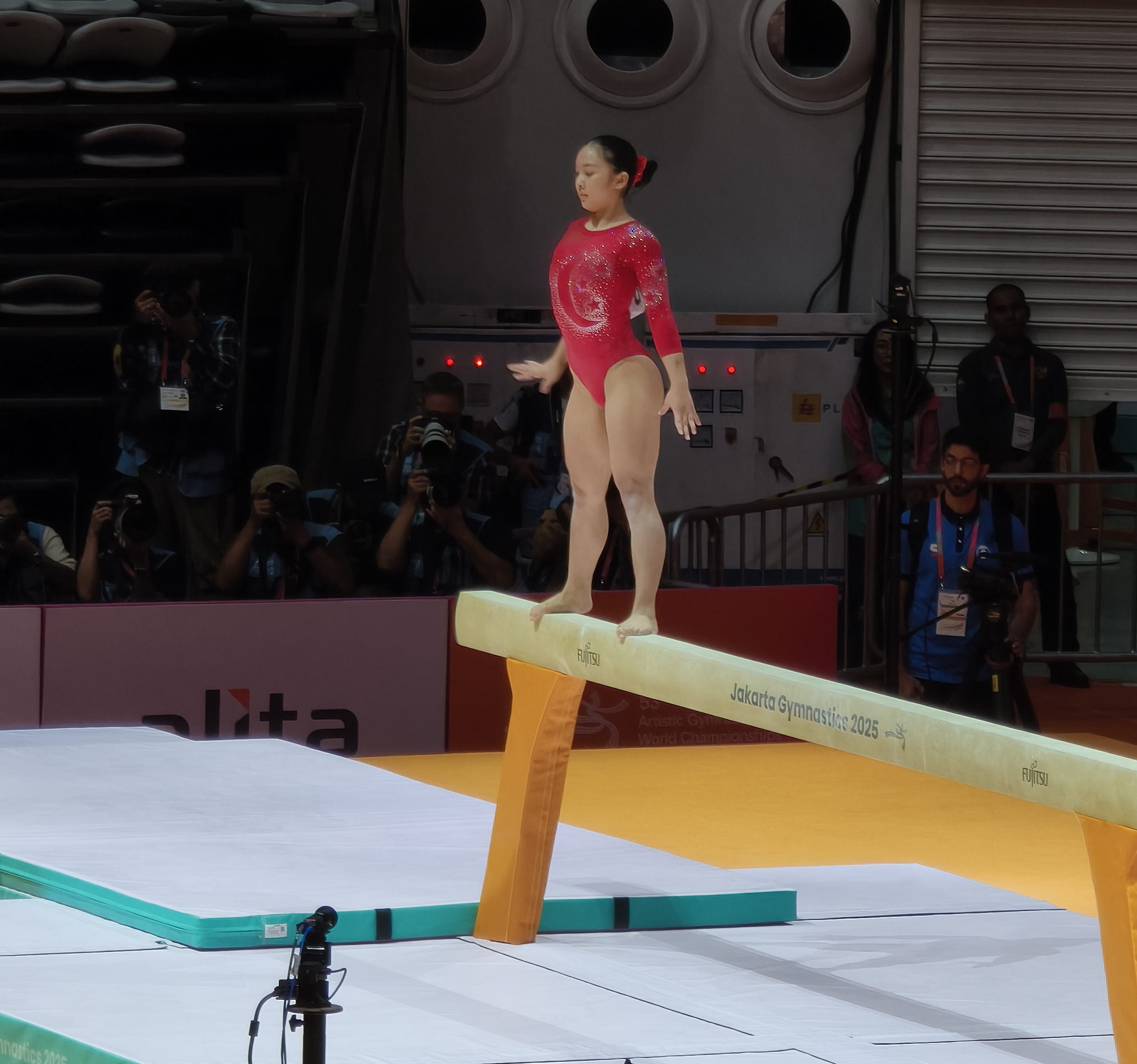
Yap competing on the balance beam at the 2025 World Championships

Competitive history of Amanda Yap
Year	Event	Team	AA	VT	UB	BB	FX
2022	Singapore Championships		9		9	1st place, gold medalist(s)	7
2022	Singapore Open		10				8
2023	Singapore Championships		3rd place, bronze medalist(s)		2nd place, silver medalist(s)	2nd place, silver medalist(s)	2nd place, silver medalist(s)
2023	Singapore Open		2nd place, silver medalist(s)		8	3rd place, bronze medalist(s)	6
2023	Junior Asian Championships	6	15				
2024	Singapore Championships		1st place, gold medalist(s)	1st place, gold medalist(s)	3rd place, bronze medalist(s)	1st place, gold medalist(s)	3rd place, bronze medalist(s)
2024	Junior Asian Championships	4	7			2nd place, silver medalist(s)	8
2024	Singapore Open		1st place, gold medalist(s)	1st place, gold medalist(s)	2nd place, silver medalist(s)	1st place, gold medalist(s)	2nd place, silver medalist(s)
2025	Singapore Championships		1st place, gold medalist(s)			2nd place, silver medalist(s)	3rd place, bronze medalist(s)
2025	Asian Championships	7	15				
2025	World Championships					6	
2025	Southeast Asian Games					2nd place, silver medalist(s)	
2026
2026	Asian Championships	8	13			6	5
2026	Commonwealth Games	7	14			2nd place, silver medalist(s)	8
2026	Asian Games	8	9			6	R1
2026	World Championships		68				

== Accolades ==
- The Straits Times Young Singaporean of the Year 2025
