= Lia Redick =

Canadian artistic gymnast (born 2009)

- Full name: Lia Grace Redick
- Born: October 8, 2009 (age 17) Oakville, Ontario

Gymnastics career
- Country represented: Canada; (2024–present)
- College team: LSU Tigers (2028–2031)
- Club: Oakville Gymnastics
- Head coach: Lena Yermolchuk
Medal record
Women's artistic gymnastics
Representing Canada
Commonwealth Games
Silver medal – second place	2026 Glasgow	Team
Pan American Championships
Gold medal – first place	2025 Panama City	Balance beam
Silver medal – second place	2025 Panama City	Team
Silver medal – second place	2026 Rio de Janeiro	Floor exercise
Bronze medal – third place	2026 Rio de Janeiro	Team

Lia Grace Redick (born October 8, 2009) is a Canadian artistic gymnast. She is the 2025 Pan American balance beam champion.

== Early life ==
Redick was born on October 8, 2009, in Oakville, Ontario. She began her gymnastics career at three years old. Her sister, Olivia, is also a gymnast.

== Junior gymnastics career ==
In May 2022, Redick competed at the Junior Canadian Championships and won the gold medal on the uneven bars and placed sixth in the all-around.

Redick began the 2024 season at the Elite Canada, where she won the all-around bronze medal. Then at the International Gymnix, she placed sixth in the all-around and seventh in the balance beam final. At the 2024 DTB Pokal Team Challenge, she won the bronze medal in the vault final. She won a silver medal with the Canadian junior team at the 2024 Pan American Championships, and she placed fourth in the all-around.

Redick won the bronze medal in the all-around at the 2024 Junior Canadian Championships. She also won the silver medal on the balance beam and the bronze medal on the floor exercise. She then competed at the Olympic Hopes Cup in Brno, and won the all-around title. In the event finals, she won the gold medal on the floor exercise and the silver medals on both the uneven bars and balance beam.

== Senior gymnastics career ==
=== 2025 ===
Redick became age-eligible for senior competitions in 2025 and began the season at the Elite Canada, finishing fourth in the all-around. She then helped the Canadian team win the gold medal at the International Gymnix. In March, she competed at the 2025 DTB Pokal Team Challenge and helped Canada finish second as a team. She then competed at the DTB Pokal Mixed Cup and helped Canada finish third as a team.

Redick placed eighth in the all-around at the Canadian Championships. She was then selected to compete at the 2025 Pan American Championships. There, she helped Canada win team silver. During the event finals, she won the gold medal on the balance beam.

=== 2026 ===
At the 2026 Pan American Championships, Redick competed for Canada alongside teammates, Gabrielle Black, Alyssa Guerrier-Calixte, Lia Monica Fontaine, and Aurélie Tran. The Canadian team won bronze behind the United States and Brazil. Individually she won a silver medal on floor exercise with a score of 13.400.

On July 3, 2026, she was selected to represent Canada at the 2026 Commonwealth Games. During the team competition she helped Canada win a silver medal. Individually, she was named second reserve on uneven bars for the event finals.

In September 2026, she was named to the Canadian team for the 2026 World Championships alongside Lia-Monica Fontaine, Ellie Black, Gabrielle Black and Coralie Demers. At the World Championships Canada finished in eighth place in the team event. Individually, she qualified in second to the floor exercise final, and tenth to the individual all-around final.

== Competitive history ==
Competitive history of Lia Redick at the junior level
Year	Event	Team	AA	VT	UB	BB	FX
2022	Canadian Championships		6		1st place, gold medalist(s)		
2024	Elite Canada		3rd place, bronze medalist(s)	2nd place, silver medalist(s)		2nd place, silver medalist(s)	3rd place, bronze medalist(s)
2024	International Gymnix	5	6			7	
2024	DTB Pokal Team Challenge	4	6	3rd place, bronze medalist(s)	6		
2024	Pan American Championships	2nd place, silver medalist(s)	4			6	
2024	Canadian Championships		3rd place, bronze medalist(s)			2nd place, silver medalist(s)	3rd place, bronze medalist(s)
2024	Olympic Hopes Cup		1st place, gold medalist(s)		2nd place, silver medalist(s)	2nd place, silver medalist(s)	1st place, gold medalist(s)

Competitive history of Lia Redick at the senior level
Year	Event	Team	AA	VT	UB	BB	FX
2025	Elite Canada		4			2nd place, silver medalist(s)	
2025	International Gymnix	1st place, gold medalist(s)	6			5	
2025	DTB Pokal Team Challenge	2nd place, silver medalist(s)					
2025	DTB Pokal Mixed Cup	3rd place, bronze medalist(s)					
2025	Canadian Championships		8				
2025	Pan American Championships	2nd place, silver medalist(s)				1st place, gold medalist(s)	
2026	Elite Canada		1st place, gold medalist(s)		3rd place, bronze medalist(s)	2nd place, silver medalist(s)	1st place, gold medalist(s)
2026	DTB Pokal Team Challenge	1st place, gold medalist(s)	1st place, gold medalist(s)				1st place, gold medalist(s)
2026	DTB Pokal Mixed Cup	4					
2026	Pan American Championships	3rd place, bronze medalist(s)	6		R1	4	2nd place, silver medalist(s)
2026	Commonwealth Games	2nd place, silver medalist(s)					4
2026	World Championships	8	24				5
