= Senna Deriks =

Belgian artistic gymnast (born 2000)

- Full name: Senna Sandra Deriks
- Born: 30 December 2000 (age 25) Emmen, Netherlands
- Height: 1.54 m (5 ft 1 in)

Gymnastics career
- Discipline: Women's artistic gymnastics
- Country represented: Belgium; (2014–2019)
- Training location: Ghent, Belgium
- Head coaches: Marjorie Heuls and Yves Kieffer
- Retired: 2020

Senna Sandra Deriks (born 30 December 2000) is a Belgian former artistic gymnast. She competed at the 2016 Summer Olympics and the 2018 and 2019 World Championships.

== Gymnastics career ==
Deriks began gymnastics when she was five years old because her older sister was also a gymnast.

=== Junior ===
Deriks made her international debut at the 2014 International Gymnix and helped the Belgian team finish fourth, and she finished 20th in the all-around. She missed multiple months of competition in 2014 due to a fractured foot. She returned in November at the 2014 Elite Gym Massilia and won a bronze medal in the team event.

Deriks won the all-around silver medal at the 2015 Belgian Championships behind Nina Derwael. She fractured her other foot and missed more competition. She returned in November at the 2015 Elite Gym Massilia and finished 23rd in the all-around. At the 2015 Top Gym Tournament, she won the all-around silver medal behind teammate Axelle Klinckaert.

=== Senior ===
Deriks became age-eligible for senior competitions in 2016. She made her senior debut at the International Gymnix and won the uneven bars silver medal. At the Olympic Test Event, she helped Belgium finish third and qualify as a full team for the Olympic Games for the first time since 1948. She was selected to represent Belgium at the 2016 Summer Olympics alongside Nina Derwael, Rune Hermans, Gaëlle Mys, and Laura Waem. The team finished 12th in the qualification phase.

Deriks competed at the 2017 City of Jesolo Trophy and finished fourth on the uneven bars and fifth on the floor exercise. She missed the 2017 European Championships due to a knee injury. She returned to competition at the 2017 FIT Challenge and only competed on the uneven bars to help Belgium win the bronze medal.

Deriks was initially the alternate for the 2018 European Championships but was called in to compete due to injuries to Julie Meyers and Rune Hermans. She was only able to compete on the uneven bars due to ongoing injuries, but the Belgian team still qualified to the team final in third place. However, the team withdrew from the final to prevent further injuries. She was then selected to compete at the World Championships alongside Nina Derwael, Axelle Klinckaert, Maellyse Brassart, and Rune Hermans, and they finished 11th during the qualification round.

Deriks competed at the 2019 European Games and advanced to the all-around final, where she finished sixth. In October 2019, she competed at the World Championships in Stuttgart. During qualifications, she helped Belgium finish in tenth place. Although they did not qualify for the team final, they did qualify as a team for the 2020 Olympic Games in Tokyo.

Deriks was scheduled to compete at the 2020 Stuttgart World Cup, but the event was postponed and eventually canceled due to the COVID-19 pandemic. She announced her retirement in May 2020.
