= Laura Waem =

Belgian artistic gymnast (born 1997)

- Born: 5 August 1997 (age 29) Sint-Niklaas, Belgium
- Height: 160 cm (5 ft 3 in)

Gymnastics career
- Discipline: Women's artistic gymnastics
- Country represented: Belgium
- Club: Topsportcentrum Ghent
- Head coach: Yves Kieffer
- Assistant coach: Majorie Huels
- Retired: 2017

Laura Waem (born 5 August 1997) is a Belgian former artistic gymnast. She represented Belgium at the 2016 Summer Olympics and is a two-time World Championships all-around finalist.

== Gymnastics career ==
=== 2012 ===
Waem joined Belgium's junior national team in 2012. She competed at the International Gymnix in Montreal and placed 17th in the all-around. Then in the event finals, she finished fifth on the balance beam and eighth on the floor exercise. She then competed at the Junior European Championships, helping the Belgian team place 12th.

=== 2013 ===
Waem became age-eligible for senior international competitions in 2013. She made her senior international debut at the International Gymnix, finishing 12th in the all-around. There, she also finished sixth on the uneven bars and fourth on the balance beam. She qualified for the uneven bars final at the Anadia World Challenge Cup, finishing seventh. She placed 11th in the all-around at the Dutch Invitational. She then competed at the World Championships in Antwerp and qualified for the all-around final alongside Gaelle Mys, marking the first time two Belgian gymnasts qualified for the World all-around final. In the final, Waem finished 21st.

=== 2014 ===
Waem began the season at the International Gymnix and finished sixth in the all-around, seventh on the uneven bars, and eighth on the balance beam. At the Belgian Championships, she finished second in the all-around to Lisa Verschueren. She then finished fourth in the all-around at a friendly meet against France and Romania. At the European Championships, she helped Belgium qualify for their second-ever European team final and finish seventh. She then finished fourth in the all-around at the Novara Cup, and Belgium placed third as a team.

Waem competed at the 2014 World Championships and helped the Belgian team finish 11th, which at the time was the best-ever World Championships team result for Belgium. Waem also qualified for her second consecutive World all-around final and finished 24th.

=== 2015 ===
Waem only competed on the uneven bars at a friendly meet against Sweden and Austria, finishing third behind teammates Cindy Vandenhole and Lisa Verschueren. She then competed in the all-around at the Novara Cup, finishing 13th, and Belgium placed third as a team. She competed at the World Championships alongside Vandenhole, Verschueren, Julie Croket, Rune Hermans, and Gaelle Mys. They finished 11th as a team and qualified for the 2016 Olympic Test Event. She did not qualify for a third all-around final due to a fall off the uneven bars.

=== 2016 ===
Waem began the season at the International Gymnix, helping Belgium win the team competition and finishing fourth on the uneven bars. She then helped Belgium win a friendly meet against Romania and Germany and placed second in the all-around behind teammate Axelle Klinckaert. At the Olympic Test Event, Waem helped Belgium finish third and qualify as a full team for the Olympic Games for the first time since 1948. She competed as a guest at the Dutch Championships and won a gold medal on the uneven bars.

Waem was selected to represent Belgium at the 2016 Summer Olympics alongside Klinckaert (later replaced by reserve Rune Hermans), Senna Deriks, Nina Derwael, and Gaelle Mys. The team placed 12th in the qualification round.

== Post-gymnastics ==
Waem tore her Achilles tendon in 2017 and subsequently announced her retirement to focus on her pharmaceutical science studies. In 2020, Waem published an open letter detailing her experience of abuse in gymnastics.

== Competitive history ==
Competitive history of Laura Waem
Year	Event	Team	AA	VT	UB	BB	FX
Junior
2012	International Gymnix		17			5	8
2012	Junior European Championships	12					
Senior
2013	International Gymnix		12		6	4	
2013	Anadia World Challenge Cup				7		
2013	Dutch Invitational		11				
2013	World Championships		21				
2014	International Gymnix		6		7	8	
2014	Belgian Championships		2nd place, silver medalist(s)	3rd place, bronze medalist(s)	1st place, gold medalist(s)	3rd place, bronze medalist(s)	
2014	Beaumont en Véron Friendly	3rd place, bronze medalist(s)	4		2nd place, silver medalist(s)		
2014	European Championships	7					
2014	Novara Cup	3rd place, bronze medalist(s)	4			3rd place, bronze medalist(s)	
2014	World Championships	11	24				
2015	BEL-SWE-AUS Friendly				3rd place, bronze medalist(s)		
2015	Novara Cup	3rd place, bronze medalist(s)	13				
2015	World Championships	11					
2016	International Gymnix	1st place, gold medalist(s)			4		
2016	Belgium Friendly	1st place, gold medalist(s)	2nd place, silver medalist(s)		2nd place, silver medalist(s)	3rd place, bronze medalist(s)	
2016	Olympic Test Event	3rd place, bronze medalist(s)	11		8		
2016	Dutch Championships				1st place, gold medalist(s)	7	
2016	Olympic Games	12					
