= Rose-Kaying Woo =

Canadian artistic gymnast (born 2000)

- Born: January 12, 2000 (age 26) LaSalle, Quebec, Canada
- Height: 145 cm (4 ft 9 in)

Gymnastics career
- Discipline: Women's artistic gymnastics
- Country represented: Canada; (2011–present)
- Club: Gym-Richelieu
- Head coach: Michel Charron
- Retired: September 16, 2025
Medal record
Representing Canada
Pan American Championships
Bronze medal – third place	2022 Rio de Janeiro	Team
Pacific Rim Championships
Silver medal – second place	2014 Richmond	Team
Bronze medal – third place	2014 Richmond	Floor exercise
FIG World Cup
Event / 1st / 2nd / 3rd; World Challenge Cup / 0 / 2 / 3

Rose-Kaying Woo (born January 12, 2000) is a Canadian former artistic gymnast. She competed at the 2016 Summer Olympics and was a team alternate for the 2020 and 2024 Summer Olympics. At the 2022 Pan American Championships, she won a team bronze medal. She also competed at the 2014 Pacific Rim Championships, where she helped the Canadian team win a silver medal.

== Gymnastics career ==
=== Junior ===
Woo won the junior all-around title at the 2014 International Gymnix and helped Canada win the team silver medal behind Russia. She also won gold medals in the balance beam and floor exercise event finals, and she won a bronze medal in the uneven bars final, behind Daria Skrypnik and Angelina Melnikova. At the 2014 Junior Pan American Championships, she helped Canada win the team title, and she won the all-around bronze medal behind Brazilians Flávia Saraiva and Rebeca Andrade. She then competed at the Pacific Rim Championships with Aleeza Yu, Maegan Chant, Ellie Black, Shallon Olsen, and Megan Roberts, and they won the team silver medal behind the United States. Individually, she won a bronze medal in the junior floor exercise final. She won the junior all-around title at the 2014 Canadian Championships. At the 2014 Elite Gym Massilia, she won the silver medal on the uneven bars behind Daria Spiridonova.

Woo won the all-around title at the 2015 International Gymnix, and she also won gold medals in the balance beam and floor exercise finals. At the 2015 City of Jesolo Trophy, she won a silver medal in the team competition and placed fourth in the all-around. In the event finals, she won bronze medals on both the uneven bars and the balance beam.

=== Senior ===
Woo became a senior gymnast in 2016. At the 2016 Osijek World Challenge Cup, she won a bronze medal on the vault, behind Ellie Downie and Tjaša Kysselef. She was selected for Canada's 2016 Olympics team alongside Ellie Black, Shallon Olsen, Isabela Onyshko, and Brittany Rogers; the team finished ninth.

At the 2017 Szombathely World Challenge Cup, Woo won a bronze medal on the uneven bars, behind Jonna Adlerteg and Zsófia Kovács. She tore her Achilles tendon while warming up at the 2018 Stuttgart World Cup.

Woo won a bronze medal with the Canadian team at the 2020 International Gymnix. She was selected as an alternate for Canada's 2020 Olympic team. She then competed at the 2021 World Championships and advanced into the all-around final, finishing 18th. She helped Canada win a bronze medal in the team event at the 2022 Pan American Championships. She missed the 2022 World Championships with a back injury.

Woo won silver medals on the uneven bars and the balance beam at the 2023 Mersin World Challenge Cup, both behind Anna Lashchevska. She competed with the Canadian team that finished 12th in the qualifications at the 2023 World Championships. She won a bronze medal on the uneven bars at the 2024 Varna World Challenge Cup. She was once again an alternate for Canada's Olympic team.

On September 16, 2025 Woo announced her retirement from the sport via Instagram.

== Personal life ==
In September 2021, Woo and her sister Victoria-Kayen launched Elegant Woo's, a gymnastics leotard brand.

== Competitive history ==
Junior competitive history of Rose-Kaying Woo
Year	Event	Team	AA	VT	UB	BB	FX
2012	Elite Canada		4		2nd place, silver medalist(s)	1st place, gold medalist(s)	
2012	International Gymnix (Challenge)		13				
2013	Elite Canada		7	4		1st place, gold medalist(s)	7
2013	Nadia Comaneci Invitational		3rd place, bronze medalist(s)	6	2nd place, silver medalist(s)	2nd place, silver medalist(s)	3rd place, bronze medalist(s)
2013	International Gymnix				7	3rd place, bronze medalist(s)	8
2013	Canadian Championships		6	5		3rd place, bronze medalist(s)	4
2013	Elite Gym Massilia	5	18				
2014	Elite Canada		1st place, gold medalist(s)	2nd place, silver medalist(s)	1st place, gold medalist(s)	1st place, gold medalist(s)	3rd place, bronze medalist(s)
2014	International Gymnix		1st place, gold medalist(s)	5	3rd place, bronze medalist(s)	1st place, gold medalist(s)	1st place, gold medalist(s)
2014	Pacific Rim Championships		6	6	5	5	3rd place, bronze medalist(s)
2014	Canadian Championships		1st place, gold medalist(s)	3rd place, bronze medalist(s)	1st place, gold medalist(s)	4	1st place, gold medalist(s)
2014	Elite Gym Massilia		6	2nd place, silver medalist(s)			
2015	Elite Canada		1st place, gold medalist(s)			2nd place, silver medalist(s)	
2015	Canada Games		1st place, gold medalist(s)	3rd place, bronze medalist(s)	2nd place, silver medalist(s)	1st place, gold medalist(s)	
2015	International Gymnix		1st place, gold medalist(s)			1st place, gold medalist(s)	1st place, gold medalist(s)
2015	City of Jesolo Trophy	2nd place, silver medalist(s)	4		3rd place, bronze medalist(s)	3rd place, bronze medalist(s)	
2015	Canadian Championships*		3rd place, bronze medalist(s)	2nd place, silver medalist(s)	12	3rd place, bronze medalist(s)	3rd place, bronze medalist(s)

*Woo competed as a junior in the senior category at the 2015 Canadian Championships.

Senior competitive history of Rose-Kaying Woo
Year	Event	Team	AA	VT	UB	BB	FX
2016	Elite Canada		4		5	4	7
2016	International Gymnix		3rd place, bronze medalist(s)			8	
2016	Osijek World Challenge Cup			3rd place, bronze medalist(s)	4	4	
2016	Canadian Championships		3rd place, bronze medalist(s)	10	4	3rd place, bronze medalist(s)	9
2016	Canadian Olympic Trials Day 1		6	7	8	7	7
2016	Canadian Olympic Trials Day 2		2nd place, silver medalist(s)	4	2nd place, silver medalist(s)	1st place, gold medalist(s)	3rd place, bronze medalist(s)
2016	Rio Olympic Games	9			52	55	38
2017	Elite Canada		28			3rd place, bronze medalist(s)	
2017	International Gymnix	3rd place, bronze medalist(s)	16				
2017	Koper Challenge Cup			8	6	7	
2017	Canadian Championships		2nd place, silver medalist(s)	4	2nd place, silver medalist(s)	3rd place, bronze medalist(s)	2nd place, silver medalist(s)
2017	Szombathely Challenge Cup				3rd place, bronze medalist(s)	5	8
2017	Elite Gym Massilia		14			1st place, gold medalist(s)	
2017	Cottbus World Cup				7	8	4
2018	Elite Canada		3rd place, bronze medalist(s)		4	1st place, gold medalist(s)	4
2018	International Gymnix		64				
2019	Elite Canada		32				
2019	International Gymnix	3rd place, bronze medalist(s)	24				
2019	International GymSport		2nd place, silver medalist(s)		2nd place, silver medalist(s)		
2019	Canadian Championships		8				
2019	FIT Challenge	4	29				
2019	Paris Challenge Cup				15	6	R1
2019	Arthur Gander Memorial		10	7	8	6	
2019	Swiss Cup	9					
2020	International Gymnix	3rd place, bronze medalist(s)	25			6	4
2021	Elite Canada		3rd place, bronze medalist(s)		1st place, gold medalist(s)	3rd place, bronze medalist(s)	4
2021	Canadian Technical Trial 1		3rd place, bronze medalist(s)		2nd place, silver medalist(s)	3rd place, bronze medalist(s)	1st place, gold medalist(s)
2021	Canadian Technical Trial 2		3rd place, bronze medalist(s)		3rd place, bronze medalist(s)	3rd place, bronze medalist(s)	1st place, gold medalist(s)
2021	Canadian Championships		33		3rd place, bronze medalist(s)		
2021	World Championships		18		25	33	30
2022	International GymSport		1st place, gold medalist(s)		1st place, gold medalist(s)		1st place, gold medalist(s)
2022	Canadian Championships		1st place, gold medalist(s)		1st place, gold medalist(s)		1st place, gold medalist(s)
2022	Pan American Championships	3rd place, bronze medalist(s)	5		5		4
2023	Canadian Worlds Trials		12		2nd place, silver medalist(s)	3rd place, bronze medalist(s)	
2023	Mersin Challenge Cup				2nd place, silver medalist(s)	2nd place, silver medalist(s)	
2023	World Championships	12			82	67	
2023	Gymnova Cup		1st place, gold medalist(s)		1st place, gold medalist(s)	2nd place, silver medalist(s)	
2024	Elite Canada		34				
2024	Cottbus World Cup				R1	15	
2024	International Gymnix		15			8	
2024	Varna Challenge Cup				3rd place, bronze medalist(s)	29	R2
2024	Canadian Championships		4	26	4	5	4
2025	DTB Pokal Team Challenge	2nd place, silver medalist(s)	8		1st place, gold medalist(s)	5	
2025	DTB Pokal Mixed Cup	2nd place, silver medalist(s)					
2025	Cairo World Cup					4	5
