= 2012 Pan American Individual Event Artistic Gymnastics Championships =

International sports competition

The 2012 Pan American Individual Event Artistic Gymnastics Championships was held in Medellín, Colombia, June 19–25, 2012. The competition was organized by the Colombian Gymnastics Federation and approved by the International Gymnastics Federation.

== Medal summary ==
=== Senior medalists ===
Event	Gold	Silver	Bronze
Men
Floor exercise	Luis Rivera (PUR)	Alexander Rodríguez (PUR)	Francisco Barreto (BRA)
Pommel horse	José Fuentes (VEN)	Jhonny Muñoz (COL)	Luis Rivera (PUR)
Rings	Federico Molinari (ARG)	Luis Rivera (PUR)	Osvaldo Martínez (ARG)
Vault	Angel Ramos (PUR)	Juan González (CHI)	Petrix Barbosa (BRA)
Parallel bars	Jorge Giraldo (COL)	Sérgio Sasaki (BRA)	Luis Rivera (PUR)
Horizontal bar	Nicolas Cordoba (ARG)	Sérgio Sasaki (BRA) Angel Ramos (PUR)	—
Women
Vault	Yamilet Peña (DOM)	Paula Mejías (PUR)	Adrian Gomes (BRA)
Uneven bars	Bibiana Vélez (COL)	Dovélis Torres (CUB)	Selene Vázquez (MEX)
Balance beam	Daniele Hypólito (BRA)	Adrian Gomes (BRA)	Simona Castro (CHI)
Floor exercise	Daniele Hypólito (BRA)	Bibiana Vélez (COL) Barbara Achondo (CHI)	—

=== Junior medalists ===
Event	Gold	Silver	Bronze
Boys
Team all-around	Colombia; Carlos Calvo; Jossimar Calvo; Juan Escobar; Camilo Sanchez	United States; Marvin Kimble; Akash Modi; Joseph Peters; Timothy Wang	Puerto Rico; Jaime da Silva; Tristian Pérez; Carlos Rivera; Alexis Torres
Individual all-around	Jossimar Calvo (COL)	Alexis Torres (PUR)	Akash Modi (USA)
Floor exercise	Jossimar Calvo (COL)	Ernesto Vila (CUB)	Alexis Torres (PUR)
Pommel horse	Jossimar Calvo (COL)	Akash Modi (USA)	Fellipe Arakawa (BRA)
Rings	Jossimar Calvo (COL) Alexis Torres (PUR)	—	Marvin Kimble (USA)
Vault	Jossimar Calvo (COL)	Alexis Torres (PUR)	Audrys Nin (DOM)
Parallel bars	Jossimar Calvo (COL)	Akash Modi (USA)	Timothy Wang (USA)
Horizontal bar	Jossimar Calvo (COL)	Ernesto Vila (CUB)	Alexis Torres (PUR)
Girls
Team all-around	Canada; Maegan Chant; Ivy Lu; Victoria Woo; Aleeza Yu	Brazil; Rebeca Andrade; Frida Lopes; Lorrane Oliveira; Ana Flávia Silva	Mexico; Miriana Almeida; Carla Cornejo; Nayeli Diaz; Paula Heredia
Individual all-around	Rebeca Andrade (BRA)	Victoria-Kayen Woo (CAN)	Aleeza Yu (CAN)
Vault	Rebeca Andrade (BRA)	Carla Cornejo (MEX)	Lorrane Oliveira (BRA) Victoria Woo (CAN)
Uneven bars	Victoria-Kayen Woo (CAN)	Aleeza Yu (CAN)	Ginna Escobar (COL)
Balance beam	Frida Lopes (BRA)	Malena Ferreyra (ARG)	Rebeca Andrade (BRA)
Floor exercise	Rebeca Andrade (BRA)	Maegan Chant (CAN)	Lorrane Oliveira (BRA)

== Medal table ==
=== Seniors ===
Rank	Nation	Gold	Silver	Bronze	Total
1	Puerto Rico (PUR)	2	4	2	8
2	Brazil (BRA)	2	3	3	8
3	Colombia (COL)	2	2	0	4
4	Argentina (ARG)	2	0	1	3
5	Dominican Republic (DOM)	1	0	0	1
5	Venezuela (VEN)	1	0	0	1
7	Chile (CHI)	0	2	1	3
8	Cuba (CUB)	0	1	0	1
9	Mexico (MEX)	0	0	1	1
Totals (9 entries)		10	12	8	30

=== Juniors ===
Rank	Nation	Gold	Silver	Bronze	Total
1	Colombia (COL)	8	0	1	9
2	Brazil (BRA)	4	1	4	9
3	Canada (CAN)	2	3	2	7
4	Puerto Rico (PUR)	1	2	3	6
5	United States (USA)	0	3	3	6
6	Cuba (CUB)	0	2	0	2
7	Mexico (MEX)	0	1	1	2
8	Argentina (ARG)	0	1	0	1
9	Dominican Republic (DOM)	0	0	1	1
Totals (9 entries)		15	13	15	43
