= Aleeza Yu =

Canadian artistic gymnast

- Born: 11 June 1998 (age 28) Markham, Ontario, Canada
- Height: 167 cm (5 ft 6 in)

Gymnastics career
- Discipline: Women's artistic gymnastics
- Country represented: Canada
- College team: Stanford Cardinal
- Club: Gemini Gymnastics
- Head coach: Yelena Davydova
Medal record
Women's artistic gymnastics
Representing Canada
Pacific Rim Championships
Silver medal – second place	2014 Richmond	Team
Bronze medal – third place	2014 Richmond	Floor exercise

Aleeza Yu (born 6 November 1998) is a Canadian artistic gymnast. She won two medals at the 2014 Pacific Rim Championships and competed at the 2014 World Championships.

== Gymnastics career ==
Yu started gymnastics when she was seven years old. She was invited to join the Canadian national team when she was twelve years old. She won a gold medal in the team competition at the 2012 Junior Pan American Championships, and she won the all-around bronze medal, behind Rebeca Andrade and Victoria-Kayen Woo. She also finished second to Woo in the uneven bars final.

Yu finished second in the all-around at the 2013 Junior Canadian Championships, behind Shallon Olsen. In the event finals, she won a bronze medal on the vault and silver medals on the uneven bars and balance beam. At the 2013 Junior Japan International, she finished fourth in the all-around competition. She qualified for all four apparatus finals but withdrew from the uneven bars due to a thumb injury. She competed in the other finals, finishing seventh on the vault and eighth on the balance beam and floor exercise.

Yu became age-eligible for senior international competitions in 2014. She finished second in all-around in the Elite Canada, with a total score of 55.650 points. She then competed at the 2014 International Gymnix and finished second in the all-around to teammate Ellie Black. She also won a bronze medal on the floor exercise. At the 2014 Cottbus World Cup, she finished eighth on the uneven bars and seventh on both the balance beam and floor exercise. She then competed at the Pacific Rim Championships with the Canadian team that won the silver medal behind the United States, and she won a bronze medal on the floor exercise. She was selected for the team that competed at the 2014 World Championships, but she injured her knee while competing on the balance beam and withdrew from the rest of the competition.

Yu returned to competition at the 2016 Elite Canada and won a bronze medal on the balance beam. However, she was reinjured while competing on the floor exercise. In 2016, she was awarded a full athletic scholarship at Stanford University. In February 2017, she recorded the second-highest score in Stanford's 195.775-195.200 victory over Arizona State. In January 2019 she scored the third highest vault score in the Cardinal's home opener against UCLA. She retired from the sport in 2020 due to ongoing back injuries.

== Personal life ==
Yu is the daughter of immigrants from Hong Kong, and her family practiced Falun Gong.

== Competitive history ==
Competitive history of Aleeza Yu at the junior level
Year	Event	Team	AA	VT	UB	BB	FX
2013	Elite Canada		3rd place, bronze medalist(s)	3rd place, bronze medalist(s)	1st place, gold medalist(s)	5	8
2013	Nadia Comaneci Invitational		2nd place, silver medalist(s)				
2013	International Gymnix		16	2nd place, silver medalist(s)			8
2013	Canadian Championships		2nd place, silver medalist(s)	3rd place, bronze medalist(s)	2nd place, silver medalist(s)	7	2nd place, silver medalist(s)
2013	Junior Japan International		4	7	WD	8	8

Competitive history of Aleeza Yu at the senior level
Year	Event	Team	AA	VT	UB	BB	FX
2014	Elite Canada		2nd place, silver medalist(s)		3rd place, bronze medalist(s)	2nd place, silver medalist(s)	1st place, gold medalist(s)
2014	International Gymnix		2nd place, silver medalist(s)		4		3rd place, bronze medalist(s)
2014	Cottbus World Cup				8	7	7
2014	Pacific Rim Championships	2nd place, silver medalist(s)	5			5	3rd place, bronze medalist(s)
2014	Canadian Championships		DNF				
2014	Pan American Championships	5	18				
2014	World Championships	12					
2015	Elite Canada		7			3rd place, bronze medalist(s)	8
