= Gaelle Mys =

Belgian artistic gymnast

Gaëlle Mys
- Nickname: Mighty Mys
- Born: 16 November 1991 (age 34) Drongen, Belgium
- Height: 166 cm (5 ft 5 in)

Gymnastics career
- Discipline: Women's artistic gymnastics
- Country represented: Belgium
- Club: OTV Nazareth
- Head coach: Yves Kieffer
- Assistant coach: Marjorie Heuls
- Choreographer: Irina Shadrina

Gaëlle Mys (born 16 November 1991) is a Belgian former artistic gymnast. She represented Belgium at the 2008, 2012, and 2016 Summer Olympics. Additionally, Mys took part in six World Championships (2007, 2010, 2011, 2013, 2014 and 2015). Earlier in her career, she won a bronze medal on the floor exercise at the 2006 Junior European Championships.

== Gymnastics career ==
At the 2006 Junior European Championships, Mys won a bronze medal on the floor exercise. Additionally, she placed fifth in the all-around, sixth on the balance beam, and seventh on the vault. She became age-eligible for senior competition in 2007 and won the national all-around title that year. She was the youngest competitor at the 2007 European Championships, where she finished 16th in the all-around. She then finished 68th in the all-around during the qualification round at the 2007 World Championships.

Mys successfully defended her national all-around title in 2008. She then qualified as an individual to represent Belgium at the 2008 Summer Olympics in Beijing. At the Olympics, Mys qualified for the all-around final with a total score of 57.150, a personal best. In the all-around finals, she placed 24th with a 53.900 total score after falling twice off both the balance beam and the uneven bars.

At the 2010 World Championships, Mys helped Belgium finish 15th in the team qualifications. She won the Belgian national all-around title in 2011. She won a bronze medal on the balance beam at the 2011 Doha World Challenge Cup, behind Tan Sixin and Ashleigh Brennan. She competed at the 2011 World Championships, and she finished 16th with her team.

Mys was initially not selected to represent Belgium at the 2012 Summer Olympics. However, when Julie Croket tore her ACL a few weeks before the Olympic Games, she was selected as the replacement. She finished 31st in the all-around qualifications, making her the second reserve for the final. She competed at the World Championships in Antwerp and qualified for the all-around final alongside Laura Waem, marking the first time two Belgian gymnasts qualified for the World all-around final. In the all-around final, she finished 18th.

Mys won a gold medal on the balance beam at the 2014 International Gymnix. At the European Championships, she helped Belgium qualify for their second-ever European team final and finish seventh. She then competed at the 2014 World Championships and helped the Belgian team finish 11th, which at the time was the country's best-ever World Championships team result. She represented Belgium at the 2015 European Games alongside Cindy Vandenhole and Lisa Verschueren and helped the team finish tenth. Individually, she finished sixth in the all-around final. She competed at the 2015 World Championships and helped Belgium finish 11th as a team and qualify for the 2016 Olympic Test Event.

At the Olympic Test Event, Mys helped Belgium finish third and qualify as a full team for the Olympic Games for the first time since 1948. She was then selected to represent Belgium at the 2016 Summer Olympics alongside Axelle Klinckaert (later replaced by reserve Rune Hermans), Senna Deriks, Nina Derwael, and Laura Waem. The team placed 12th in the qualification round. Mys announced her retirement after these Olympic Games. In 2020, she shared that she chose to retire due to abusive coaching.
