= Gymnastics at the 2015 European Youth Summer Olympic Festival =

- Venue: Gymnastics Palace
- Location: (Georgia (country)) Tbilisi
- Dates: 28 July–1 August 2015

Gymnastics at the 2015 European Youth Summer Olympic Festival took place from 28 July to 1 August in Tbilisi, Georgia in the Gymnastics Palace.

== Medal summary ==
=== Medal table ===
==== Overall ====
* Host nation (Georgia)

Rank	Nation	Gold	Silver	Bronze	Total
1	Russia	5	3	6	14
2	Great Britain	4	5	1	10
3	Belgium	2	3	1	6
4	France	1	0	1	2
5	Belarus	1	0	0	1
5	Switzerland	1	0	0	1
7	Italy	0	1	2	3
8	Germany	0	1	1	2
9	Ukraine	0	1	0	1
10	Georgia*	0	0	1	1
10	Hungary	0	0	1	1
Totals (11 entries)		14	14	14	42

==== Boys ====
* Host nation (Georgia)

Rank	Nation	Gold	Silver	Bronze	Total
1	Great Britain (GBR)	4	4	1	9
2	Russia (RUS)	2	1	2	5
3	Belarus (BLR)	1	0	0	1
3	Switzerland (SUI)	1	0	0	1
5	Italy (ITA)	0	1	2	3
6	Germany (GER)	0	1	0	1
6	Ukraine (UKR)	0	1	0	1
8	France (FRA)	0	0	1	1
8	Georgia (GEO)*	0	0	1	1
8	Hungary (HUN)	0	0	1	1
Totals (10 entries)		8	8	8	24

==== Girls ====
Rank	Nation	Gold	Silver	Bronze	Total
1	Russia (RUS)	3	2	4	9
2	Belgium (BEL)	2	3	1	6
3	France (FRA)	1	0	0	1
4	Great Britain (GBR)	0	1	0	1
5	Germany (GER)	0	0	1	1
Totals (5 entries)		6	6	6	18

=== Medal events ===
==== Boys ====
Event	Gold	Silver	Bronze
Team all-around	Great Britain; Giarnni Regini-Moran; Joe Fraser; Hamish Alexander Carter	Italy; Lorenzo Galli; Stefano Patron; Luca Lino Garza	Russia; Maksim Sinichkin; Artem Arnaut; Alexander Sychugov
Individual all-around	Joe Fraser; Great Britain	Maksim Sinichkin; Russia	Artem Arnaut; Russia
Floor	Giarnni Regini-Moran; Great Britain	Hamish Alexander Carter; Great Britain	Krisztian Boncser; Hungary
Pommel horse	Alexander Sychugov; Russia	Joe Fraser; Great Britain	Lorenzo Galli; Italy
Rings	Maksim Sinichkin; Russia	Nick Klessing; Germany	Joe Fraser; Great Britain
Vault	Yahor Sharamkou; Belarus	Giarnni Regini-Moran; Great Britain	Dmitrii Govorov; Georgia
Parallel bars	Joe Fraser; Great Britain	Eduard Yermakov; Ukraine	Kevin Carvalho; France
Horizontal bar	Moreno Kratter; Switzerland	Giarnni Regini-Moran; Great Britain	Lorenzo Galli; Italy

==== Girls ====
Event	Gold	Silver	Bronze
Team all-around	Russia; Daria Skrypnik; Anastasia Ilyankova; Elena Eremina	Belgium; Axelle Klinckaert; Julie Meyers; Nina Derwael	Germany; Tabea Alt; Florine Harder; Rebecca Matzon
Individual all-around	Daria Skrypnik; Russia	Axelle Klinckaert; Belgium	Anastasia Ilyankova; Russia
Vault	Marine Boyer; France	Daria Skrypnik; Russia	Elena Eremina; Russia
Uneven bars	Daria Skrypnik; Russia	Nina Derwael; Belgium	Anastasia Ilyankova; Russia
Balance beam	Axelle Klinckaert; Belgium	Maisie Methuen; Great Britain	Daria Skrypnik; Russia
Floor	Axelle Klinckaert; Belgium	Daria Skrypnik; Russia	Nina Derwael; Belgium
