= 2014 Elite Gym Massilia =

Gymnastics competition in France

The 2014 Elite Gym Massilia competition was a competition held in Marseille, France from November 14–16.

== Medal winners ==
- Master Massilia

Event	Gold	Silver	Bronze
Team all-around	Italy	Russia	Belgium
Individual all-around	Daria Spiridonova (RUS)	Giorgia Campana (ITA)	Nina Derwael (BEL)
Vault	Maria Paseka (RUS)	Shallon Olsen (CAN)	Noel van Klaveren (NED)
Uneven Bars	Daria Spiridonova (RUS)	Rose-Kaying Woo (CAN)	Giorgia Campana (ITA)
Balance Beam	Claire Martin (FRA)	Ayu Koike (JPN)	Carlotta Ferlito (ITA)
Floor Exercise	Axelle Klinckaert (BEL)	Olivia Cimpian (ROU)	Lara Mori (ITA)

== Result ==
=== Team Final ===
Rank	Team	Vault (gymnastics)	Uneven bars	Balance beam	Floor (gymnastics)	Total
1st place, gold medalist(s)	Italy	42.300 (1)	39.200 (4)	41.367 (1)	39.200 (6)	162.067
1st place, gold medalist(s)	Giorgia Campana	13.833	13.567	13.800	12.633	162.067
1st place, gold medalist(s)	Carlotta Ferlito	13.767	13.067	13.833	13.033	162.067
1st place, gold medalist(s)	Lara Mori		12.567	13.733	13.533	162.067
1st place, gold medalist(s)	Sofia Bonistalli	14.700	9.967	11.300	10.633	162.067
2nd place, silver medalist(s)	Russia	42.033 (2T)	41.100 (1)	38.533 (4)	40.233 (3)	161.900
2nd place, silver medalist(s)	Daria Spiridonova	14.000	14.567	12.233	13.367	161.900
2nd place, silver medalist(s)	Maria Paseka	14.067	14.000		13.467	161.900
2nd place, silver medalist(s)	Lilia Akhaimova	13.967	11.267	12.300	13.400	161.900
2nd place, silver medalist(s)	Polina Fedorova	13.433	12.533	14.000	11.200	161.900
3rd place, bronze medalist(s)	Belgium	41.300 (5)	39.767 (3)	38.600 (3)	41.200 (1)	160.867

=== All-Around ===
Position	Gymnast	Vault (gymnastics)	Uneven bars	Balance beam	Floor (gymnastics)	Total
1st place, gold medalist(s)	Daria Spiridonova (RUS)	14.000	14.567	12.233	13.367	54.167
2nd place, silver medalist(s)	Giorgia Campana (ITA)	13.833	13.567	13.800	12.633	53.833
3rd place, bronze medalist(s)	Nina Derwael (BEL)	13.700	13.767	12.333	13.900	53.700
4	Carlotta Ferlito (ITA)	13.767	13.067	13.833	13.033	53.700
18	Polina Fedorova (RUS)	13.433	12.533	14.000	11.200	51.167
20	Lilia Akhaimova (RUS)	13.967	12.533	14.000	11.200	50.933
