= Kirsten Peterman =

Canadian artistic gymnast

- Born: 22 February 1998 (age 28) Cambridge, Ontario, Canada
- Height: 160 cm (5 ft 3 in)

Gymnastics career
- Discipline: Women's artistic gymnastics
- Country represented: Canada
- College team: Maryland Terrapins
Medal record
Women's artistic gymnastics
Representing Canada
Pacific Rim Championships
Bronze medal – third place	2016 Everett	Team

Kirsten Peterman (born 22 February 1998) is a retired Canadian artistic gymnast. Currently Academic Coach/Coordinator for Football at Arizona State University in Tempe, AZ.

== Biography ==
She was born on 22 February 1998 in Cambridge, Ontario, Canada, to Tim Griffin and Karyn Peterman. Peterman won the vault event at the 2013 International Gymnix and placed third next year at the 2014 International Gymnix. A former member of the Canada women's national artistic gymnastics team, she won a silver medal with her national team at the 2016 Pacific Rim Gymnastics Championships in Everett, where she was the third best Canadian. In March of the same year she was the 10th all-around gymnast at the International Gymnix.
