= Pacific Rim Championships – Women's team all-around =

Women's gymnastics competition

Three medals are awarded: gold for first place, silver for second place, and bronze for third place. Tie breakers have not been used in every year. In the event of a tie between two gymnasts, both names are listed, and the following position (second for a tie for first, third for a tie for second) is left empty because a medal was not awarded for that position. If three gymnastics tied for a position, the following two positions are left empty.

== Medalists ==
| Year | Location | Gold | Silver | Bronze | Ref. |
|---|---|---|---|---|---|
| 1998 | (Canada) Winnipeg | United States | Australia | China | |
| 2000 | (New Zealand) Christchurch | United States | Australia | China | |
| 2002 | (Canada) Vancouver | United States | Australia | Japan | |
| 2004 | (United States) Honolulu | United States | Australia | China | |
| 2006 | (United States) Honolulu | United States | Australia | Canada | |
| 2008 | (United States) San Jose | United States | Canada | China | |
| 2010 | (Australia) Melbourne | United States | China | Australia | |
| 2012 | (United States) Everett | United States | China | Canada | |
| 2014 | (Canada) Richmond | United States | Canada | China | |
| 2016 | (United States) Everett | United States | Canada | Australia | |
| 2018 | (Colombia) Medellín | United States | Canada | Australia | |
| 2024 | (Colombia) Cali | United States | Canada | Guatemala | |
