= Victoria-Kayen Woo =

Canadian artistic gymnast

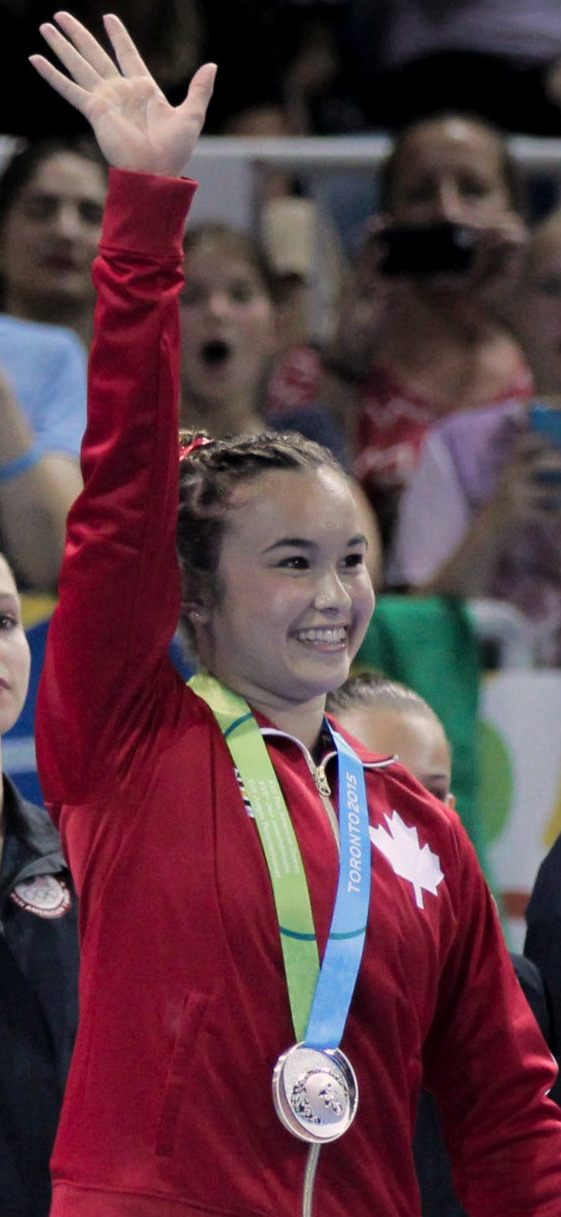
- Woo at the 2015 Pan American Games

Personal information
- Born: October 15, 1997 (age 28) LaSalle, Quebec, Canada

Gymnastics career
- Discipline: Women's artistic gymnastics
- Country represented: Canada; (2012–2021)
- Gym: Gym-Richelieu
- Head coach: Michel Charron
- Retired: November 24, 2021
Medal record
Representing Canada
Pan American Games
Silver medal – second place	2015 Toronto	Team
Silver medal – second place	2019 Lima	Team
Bronze medal – third place	2015 Toronto	Balance beam

Victoria-Kayen Woo (born 15 October 1997) is a Canadian former artistic gymnast. She is the 2015 Pan American Games bronze medalist on balance beam and silver medalist with the team. She finished fourth with her team at the 2014 Commonwealth Games, and she competed at the 2014 World Championships and 2015 World Championships.

== Personal life ==
Victoria-Kayen Woo was born in LaSalle, Quebec to parents Billy Woo and Maryse Ronda. She has a younger sister, Rose-Kaying Woo, who is also a member of the Canadian National Gymnastics Team. She began gymnastics at age three, and her favorite gymnast is Aliya Mustafina.

== Gymnastics career ==
=== 2014 ===
Woo competed at the 2014 Commonwealth Games after being brought in to replace Victoria Moors. The team finished in fourth behind England, Australia, and Wales. She competed at the 2014 World Championships where she helped the Canadian team finish in twelfth and qualify for the 2015 World Championships.

=== 2015 ===
Woo competed at the 2015 Pan American Games in Toronto. The team won a silver medal behind the United States. She won the bronze medal on beam with teammate Ellie Black winning gold and American Megan Skaggs winning silver. After the competition Woo stated, "I was already surprised to qualify for the final on beam, because this apparatus is a little pet peeve of mine. It already felt like a gift to be there, so to win a medal was really the best reward!"

=== 2019 ===
In June Woo was named to the team to compete at the 2019 Pan American Games alongside Ana Padurariu (later replaced by Isabela Onyshko), Brooklyn Moors, Shallon Olsen, and Ellie Black. Together they won the silver medal in the team final behind the United States. On September 4 Woo was named to the team to compete at the 2019 World Championships in Stuttgart, Germany alongside Ana Padurariu, Shallon Olsen, Brooklyn Moors, and Ellie Black.

=== 2021 ===
Woo announced her retirement from the sport on November 24, 2021.

== Competitive history ==
Competitive history of Victoria-Kayen Woo at the junior level
Year	Event	Team	AA	VT	UB	BB	FX
2011	Canadian Championships		7		6	4	
2012	Elite Canada		2nd place, silver medalist(s)	3rd place, bronze medalist(s)	1st place, gold medalist(s)	7	3rd place, bronze medalist(s)
2012	Canadian Championships		2nd place, silver medalist(s)	3rd place, bronze medalist(s)	1st place, gold medalist(s)		5
2012	Pacific Rim Championships	3rd place, bronze medalist(s)			2nd place, silver medalist(s)		
2012	International Gymnix		4	1st place, gold medalist(s)	2nd place, silver medalist(s)		6
2012	Pan American Championships	1st place, gold medalist(s)	2nd place, silver medalist(s)	3rd place, bronze medalist(s)	1st place, gold medalist(s)	6	6

Competitive history of Victoria-Kayen Woo at the senior level
Year	Event	Team	AA	VT	UB	BB	FX
2013	Elite Canada		7		1st place, gold medalist(s)	9	
2013	International Gymnix		1st place, gold medalist(s)	2nd place, silver medalist(s)	1st place, gold medalist(s)		3rd place, bronze medalist(s)
2013	Ljubljana World Cup				7	6	
2013	Canadian Championships		4	6			
2013	Élite Gym Massilia	5	15		3rd place, bronze medalist(s)		
2014	Elite Canada		5		4		
2014	International Gymnix		7		5	4	
2014	Canadian Championships		5		4	6	
2014	Commonwealth Games	4					
2014	Pan American Championships	5	15				
2014	World Championships	12					
2015	Elite Canada				6		
2015	International Gymnix		1st place, gold medalist(s)		3rd place, bronze medalist(s)	8	3rd place, bronze medalist(s)
2015	City of Jesolo Trophy	3rd place, bronze medalist(s)	23				
2015	Ljubljana World Cup				7		5
2015	Canadian Championships		4		3rd place, bronze medalist(s)		
2015	Pan American Games	2nd place, silver medalist(s)				3rd place, bronze medalist(s)	
2015	World Championships	6					
2015	Arthur Gander Memorial		4				
2016	Elite Canada		13				
2016	International Gymnix	2nd place, silver medalist(s)	5		7		
2016	Olympic Test Event		40				
2016	Canadian Championships		10	10	5	15	5
2016	Arthur Gander Memorial		8				
2016	Élite Gym Massilia	7	18				
2018	Elite Canada		5		1st place, gold medalist(s)	6	5
2018	International Gymnix		2nd place, silver medalist(s)		3rd place, bronze medalist(s)	10	3rd place, bronze medalist(s)
2018	Tokyo World Cup		7				
2018	Pacific Rim Championships	2nd place, silver medalist(s)	7			5	4
2018	Canadian Championships		6		15	6	2nd place, silver medalist(s)
2019	Elite Canada		4		7		2nd place, silver medalist(s)
2019	International Gymnix	3rd place, bronze medalist(s)	8		4	7	
2019	Birmingham World Cup		5				
2019	Canadian Championships		5				
2019	Pan American Games	2nd place, silver medalist(s)					
2019	World Championships	7					
2020	Elite Canada		5			3rd place, bronze medalist(s)	
2020	International Gymnix	4	7		4		
2021	Canadian Championships		6				
