= Shallon Olsen =

Canadian artistic gymnast

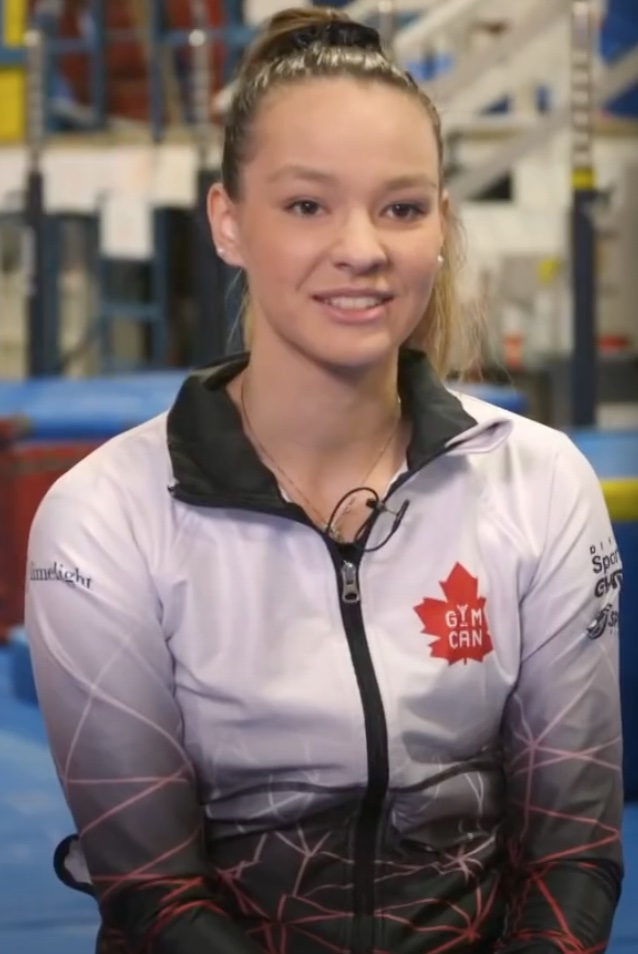
- Olsen in July 2021

Personal information
- Full name: Shallon Jade Olsen
- Born: 10 July 2000 (age 26) Vancouver, British Columbia
- Height: 5 ft 3 in (160 cm)

Gymnastics career
- Discipline: Women's artistic gymnastics
- Country represented: Canada; (2012–present)
- College team: Alabama Crimson Tide
- Club: Flicka Gymnastics
- Head coaches: Dorina Stan (elite); Dana Duckworth (NCAA)
Medal record
Women's artistic gymnastics
Representing Canada
World Championships
Silver medal – second place	2018 Doha	Vault
Bronze medal – third place	2022 Liverpool	Team
Commonwealth Games
Gold medal – first place	2018 Gold Coast	Team
Gold medal – first place	2018 Gold Coast	Vault
Bronze medal – third place	2018 Gold Coast	Floor exercise
Pan American Games
Silver medal – second place	2019 Lima	Team
Bronze medal – third place	2019 Lima	Vault
Pan American Championships
Bronze medal – third place	2022 Rio de Janeiro	Team
Pacific Rim Championships
Gold medal – first place	2016 Everett	Vault
Silver medal – second place	2016 Everett	Team
Bronze medal – third place	2016 Everett	Floor exercise
FIG World Cup
Event	1st	2nd	3rd
World Challenge Cup	0	2	0
Total	0	2	0

Shallon Jade Olsen (born 10 July 2000) is a Canadian artistic gymnast. She is the 2018 World silver medallist and 2018 Commonwealth Games champion on vault. She is also the 2018 Commonwealth Games floor exercise bronze medallist and the 2019 Pan American Games vault bronze medallist. She was a member of the Canadian team that won the gold medal at the 2018 Commonwealth Games and the silver medal at the 2019 Pan American Games. She is also the 2016 Pacific Rim vault champion, team silver medallist, and floor exercise bronze medallist. She represented Canada at the 2016 Olympics where she was the youngest member of the Canadian Olympic team and at the 2020 Olympic Games. Additionally, she competed for the University of Alabama gymnastics team, and she helped the Crimson Tide win the 2021 SEC Championships.

== Early life ==
Shallon Olsen was born on 10 July 2000 in Vancouver to parents Tony Olsen and Jayne Chow-Olsen, and she has an older brother named Chas. Her mother was born in Hong Kong and immigrated to Canada in 1966. She began gymnastics when she was three years old. She attended Centennial Secondary in Coquitlam, British Columbia outside of her hometown of Surrey to remain close to her six-day a week training at Omega Gymnastics.

== Novice career ==
Olsen made her elite debut at 2009 Elite Canada where she placed fifth in the all-around in the novice division. She won the bronze medal on the floor exercise behind Maegan Chant and Jordyn Pedersen. In 2010, she won the gold medal in the all-around at Elite Canada and the silver medal at the Novice Canadian Championships.

At the 2011 Canada Winter Games in Halifax, Nova Scotia, Olsen won the silver medal with the British Columbia team. Individually, she won the bronze medal on the balance beam and the gold medal on the floor exercise. She won the gold medal in the all-around and on the vault and the silver medals on the uneven bars, balance beam, and floor exercise at the 2011 Novice Canadian Championships.

== Junior career ==
=== 2012 ===
Olsen moved up to the junior level in 2012 and won the gold medal in the all-around at Elite Canada. In the event finals, she won the gold medals on the vault and on the floor exercise and tied for the silver medal on the uneven bars and placed eighth on the balance beam. She also won the all-around gold medal at the Canadian Gymnastics Championship in Regina, Saskatchewan. She made her international debut at the Élite Gym Massilia in November, winning gold with her team and silver in the all-around behind compatriot Rose-Kaying Woo.

=== 2013 ===
Olsen began her 2013 season by defending her Elite Canada all-around title. Additionally, she won the gold medal on the vault and the silver medal on the floor exercise, and she finished sixth on the uneven bars and fourth on the balance beam. She then competed at the International Gymnix, winning gold on vault and placing tenth in the all-around. In May, she competed at the Canadian Championships, winning gold in the all-around, vault, and floor exercise, and placing fourth on bars and fifth on beam. In November, she competed again at the Élite Gym Massilia placing fifth with the Canadian team, thirteenth in the all-around, and fourth on vault. Olsen was awarded the Kate Richardson Outstanding Female Athlete of the Year by Gymnastics British Columbia.

=== 2014 ===
In February, Olsen began her season at Elite Canada, winning gold on vault and floor and silver in the all-around, uneven bars, and balance beam. One month later at the International Gymnix, she won gold on vault, silver with her team and on floor, bronze in the all-around, and placed seventh on balance beam. She then traveled to Aracaju, Brazil for the Junior Pan American Championships and won team gold alongside teammates Rose-Kaying Woo, Megan Roberts, and Sydney Townsend. In the event finals, Olsen won the silver medal on the vault behind Brazil's Rebeca Andrade and placed forth on the floor exercise. Then at the Pacific Championships in Richmond, she helped team Canada win the silver medal behind the United States. Individually, Olsen finished seventh in the all-around and sixth on uneven bars, and she won the bronze medal on vault and the silver medal on floor exercise. In May, Olsen competed at the Canadian National Championships, winning vault gold, all-around, uneven bars, and balance beam silver, and floor exercise bronze. Then in November, she competed at the Elite Gym Massilia and won silver on vault and placed fifth with her team and eleventh in the all-around.

=== 2015 ===
Olsen competed in the senior division of the Elite Canada in late January, winning vault gold, floor exercise bronze, and placing sixth in the all-around and eighth on beam. Then at the Canada Games, she helped the British Columbia team win the bronze medal. Individually, Olsen won the silver medal in the all-around behind Rose-Kaying Woo and on vault and floor exercise behind Megan Roberts. She also won the bronze on the uneven bars and placed fourth on the balance beam. In March, she competed at the International Gymnix, winning team and vault gold and placing eighth in the all-around. Then at the City of Jesolo Trophy, she won team and vault silver and placed tenth in the all-around. Her final competition of the season was the Canadian Championships where she placed sixth in the all-around in the senior division.

== Senior career ==
=== 2016 ===
Olsen made her senior debut at Elite Canada in February. She placed fourteenth in the all-around and won the title on vault. She went on to compete at the WOGA Classic in Frisco, Texas, winning vault and floor exercise gold and all-around silver behind Japan's Nagi Kajita. Then in March, she competed at the International Gymnix, winning gold on vault and bronze on floor, and placing fourth with her team and twelfth in the all-around. In April, she competed at the Pacific Rim Championships in Everett, Washington winning vault gold, team silver, floor exercise bronze, and placing fourth in the all-around and seventh on the balance beam. She then competed at the Canadian Championships, winning vault gold, floor exercise silver, and placing fourth in the all-around, ninth on uneven bars, and eleventh on the balance beam. Then at the Canadian Olympic Trials, she won the bronze medal in the all-around.

Olsen was named to the Canadian Olympic team in late June alongside Ellie Black, Isabela Onyshko, Brittany Rogers, and Rose-Kaying Woo. She was the youngest athlete on Team Canada. During the qualification round, Canada finished ninth and missed qualifying for the team final by less than 0.200, but Olsen qualified for the vault final in sixth place. She finished eighth in the final after touching her knee to the mat on the Amanar vault.

=== 2017 ===
In February, Olsen competed at Elite Canada, winning gold on vault and placing fifth on the uneven bars and sixth in the all-around. Based on her showing at Elite Canada, she was selected to compete at both the International Gymnix and the City of Jesolo Trophy, winning vault at both competitions and winning silver in the all-around and bronze on floor at the International Gymnix. Later that year at the Canadian Championships, she won her seventh consecutive national vault title and was named to Canada's World Championship team along with Olympic teammates Ellie Black and Isabela Onyshko and first-year senior Brooklyn Moors. Prior to the World Championships, she competed at the Varna World Cup, winning silver on both the vault and floor exercise behind Brazilians Rebeca Andrade and Thais Fidelis, respectively. After winning the two silver medals, she stated, "I feel very happy with the results and it makes me feel very confident heading into worlds and future competitions." At the World Championships in Montreal, she competed on the vault and floor exercise, qualifying in fourth place into the vault final and competing a clean routine on the floor exercise to score a 13.133, but she did not qualify for that final. In the vault final, she overrotated and crashed her Amanar, finishing seventh. Afterward, she revealed that she had committed to the University of Alabama’s gymnastics team, and would begin competing for them in the 2018-2019 school year.

=== 2018 ===
Olsen began her 2018 season at Elite Canada, winning the gold medal on the vault and the silver on the floor exercise behind Brooklyn Moors. She was selected to compete at the International Gymnix, where she again won gold on vault. She also placed fifth in the all-around, ninth on the balance beam, and fourth on the floor exercise. She was selected to the Canadian team for the 2018 Commonwealth Games held in Gold Coast, Australia alongside Ellie Black, Jade Chrobok, Isabela Onyshko, and Brittany Rogers. Olsen helped the Canadian team win the gold medal, and she qualified first into the vault final and third into the floor final. In the vault final, she scored a 14.800 for her first vault and a 14.366 for her second, winning the gold medal with a 14.566 average. Then in the floor exercise final she scored a 13.266 and won the bronze medal behind Alexandra Eade and Latalia Bevan. At the Canadian Championships, she won the gold medals on the vault and the floor exercise.

Olsen was named to Canada's World Championships team alongside Ellie Black, Sophie Marois, Brooklyn Moors, and Ana Padurariu. The team placed fourth in the team final, Canada's highest finish ever at the World Artistic Gymnastics Championships. In the vault final, Olsen won the silver medal behind Simone Biles. This was the third medal won by a Canadian woman at the World Championships and the first one on vault. After winning the silver medal, Olsen said, "This is absolutely insane, I did not think I was going to come second behind Simone Biles, because she's literally amazing. I'm just really happy and ecstatic right now."

=== 2019 ===
In May, Olsen competed at the Canadian National Championships, winning gold on vault and placing fifth and fourth and beam and floor respectively. In June, she was named to the team to compete at the 2019 Pan American Games alongside Ellie Black, Ana Padurariu (later replaced by Isabela Onyshko), Brooklyn Moors, and Victoria-Kayen Woo. The team won the silver medal behind the United States. During the vault final Olsen upgraded her López to a Cheng and was able to win the bronze behind Black and Yesenia Ferrera of Cuba. She was named to the team to compete at the World Championships in Stuttgart, Germany alongside Ana Padurariu, Ellie Black, Brooklyn Moors, and Victoria-Kayen Woo. During qualifications, Olsen helped Canada place fifth, thereby qualifying Canada a team for the 2020 Olympic Games. The team went on to place seventh in the team final. Then in the vault final, she finished in fourth place behind Americans Simone Biles and Jade Carey and Ellie Downie of Great Britain.

=== 2020–2021 ===
Olsen only competed once during the 2020 elite season- at Elite Canada on the vault and the uneven bars, finishing first and eighth respectively. She returned to elite competition at the 2021 First Canadian Technical Trial, a virtual competition for Olympic team selection, and placed fourth in the all-around. At the Second Trial, she competed only on the vault and won the gold medal. At the Canadian Championships, she placed eleventh in the all-around but won gold on the vault. On June 17, Olsen was officially named to Canada's 2020 Olympic team alongside Ellie Black, Brooklyn Moors, and Ava Stewart. During the qualification round, the Canadian team placed tenth, missing the team final, but Olsen qualified for the vault final in sixth place. In the vault final, she finished seventh with an average score of 14.550.

=== 2022 ===
In July Olsen competed at the Pan American Championships alongside Denelle Pedrick, Ava Stewart, Sydney Turner, and Rose-Kaying Woo. They finished third as a team and individually Olsen placed fifth on vault. In late October Olsen was set to compete at the World Championships in Liverpool alongside Ellie Black, Emma Spence, Pedrick, Turner, and Laurie Denommée; however the sudden death of her mother left her unable to compete. Although Olsen was not physically in Liverpool, she was still officially part of the Canadian delegation as the alternate. During the team final the Canadian team won a historic bronze medal, their first team medal at the World Championships. As the alternate Olsen was also awarded the team medal.

=== 2024 ===
In late June, Olsen was named to the team to represent Canada at the 2024 Summer Olympics alongside Ellie Black, Cassie Lee, Aurélie Tran, and Ava Stewart.

At the 2024 Olympic Games Olsen helped Canada qualify to the team final, where they ultimately finished fifth. Individually she qualified to the vault final where she finished eighth after crashing her double twisting Yurchenko.

== NCAA career ==
Olsen joined the Alabama Crimson Tide women's gymnastics team in the fall of 2018. She made her NCAA gymnastics debut at Alabama on January 5, 2019, winning the vault title in a quad meet against Southeast Missouri, Temple and Northern Illinois. At the Southeastern Conference Championships, Olsen helped Alabama finish third behind LSU and Florida. She also received All-SEC and SEC Freshman honors for her performance on the balance beam where she received a 9.925. At regionals she contributed to Alabama’s third-place finish behind Michigan and UCLA, just missing a spot at nationals for the first time since 1982. She was named Alabama Gymnastics Rookie of the Year at the conclusion of the 2019 season. During the 2020 season, Olsen competed at every meet before the season was cut short due to the COVID-19 pandemic in the United States. At the 2021 SEC Championships, Olsen helped Alabama win the team title, the school's first SEC title since 2015. Olsen was named to the SEC Academic Honor Roll and as a Scholastic All-American in 2019, 2020, and 2021.

== Personal life ==
Olsen studies communications at the University of Alabama. Her hobbies include reading, completing word searches, baking, biking, and going to the movies.

== Competitive history ==
Competitive history of Shallon Olsen at the novice level
Year	Event	Team	AA	VT	UB	BB	FX
2009	Elite Canada		5	5	4		3rd place, bronze medalist(s)
2010	Elite Canada		1st place, gold medalist(s)	1st place, gold medalist(s)			1st place, gold medalist(s)
2010	Novice National Championships		2nd place, silver medalist(s)	2nd place, silver medalist(s)	8	2nd place, silver medalist(s)	1st place, gold medalist(s)
2011	Canada Games	2nd place, silver medalist(s)	5			3rd place, bronze medalist(s)	1st place, gold medalist(s)
2011	Novice National Championships		1st place, gold medalist(s)	1st place, gold medalist(s)	2nd place, silver medalist(s)	2nd place, silver medalist(s)	2nd place, silver medalist(s)

Competitive history of Shallon Olsen at the junior level
Year	Event	Team	AA	VT	UB	BB	FX
2012	Elite Canada		1st place, gold medalist(s)	1st place, gold medalist(s)	2nd place, silver medalist(s)	8	1st place, gold medalist(s)
2012	Canadian Championships		1st place, gold medalist(s)	1st place, gold medalist(s)	3rd place, bronze medalist(s)	2nd place, silver medalist(s)	2nd place, silver medalist(s)
2012	Élite Gym Massilia	1st place, gold medalist(s)	2nd place, silver medalist(s)				
2013	Elite Canada		1st place, gold medalist(s)	1st place, gold medalist(s)	6	4	2nd place, silver medalist(s)
2013	International Gymnix		10	1st place, gold medalist(s)			
2013	Canadian Championships		1st place, gold medalist(s)	1st place, gold medalist(s)	4	5	1st place, gold medalist(s)
2013	Élite Gym Massilia	5	13	4			
2014	Elite Canada		2nd place, silver medalist(s)	1st place, gold medalist(s)	2nd place, silver medalist(s)	2nd place, silver medalist(s)	1st place, gold medalist(s)
2014	International Gymnix	2nd place, silver medalist(s)	3rd place, bronze medalist(s)	1st place, gold medalist(s)		7	2nd place, silver medalist(s)
2014	Junior Pan American Championships	1st place, gold medalist(s)		2nd place, silver medalist(s)			4
2014	Pacific Rim Championships	2nd place, silver medalist(s)	6	3rd place, bronze medalist(s)	6		2nd place, silver medalist(s)
2014	Canadian Championships		2nd place, silver medalist(s)	1st place, gold medalist(s)	2nd place, silver medalist(s)	2nd place, silver medalist(s)	3rd place, bronze medalist(s)
2014	Élite Gym Massilia	5	11	2nd place, silver medalist(s)			
2015	Elite Canada		6	1st place, gold medalist(s)		8	3rd place, bronze medalist(s)
2015	Canada Games	3rd place, bronze medalist(s)	2nd place, silver medalist(s)	2nd place, silver medalist(s)	3rd place, bronze medalist(s)	4	2nd place, silver medalist(s)
2015	International Gymnix	1st place, gold medalist(s)	8	1st place, gold medalist(s)			
2015	City of Jesolo Trophy	2nd place, silver medalist(s)	10	2nd place, silver medalist(s)			
2015	Canadian Championships		6				

Competitive history of Shallon Olsen at the senior level
Year	Event	Team	AA	VT	UB	BB	FX
2016	Elite Canada		14	1st place, gold medalist(s)			
2016	WOGA Classic		2nd place, silver medalist(s)	1st place, gold medalist(s)			1st place, gold medalist(s)
2016	International Gymnix	4	12	1st place, gold medalist(s)			3rd place, bronze medalist(s)
2016	Pacific Rim Championships	2nd place, silver medalist(s)	4	1st place, gold medalist(s)		7	3rd place, bronze medalist(s)
2016	Canadian Championships		4	1st place, gold medalist(s)	9	11	2nd place, silver medalist(s)
2016	Olympic Games	9		8			
2017	Elite Canada		6	1st place, gold medalist(s)	5		7
2017	City of Jesolo Trophy	6	20	1st place, gold medalist(s)			7
2017	Canadian Championships		6	3rd place, bronze medalist(s)	8	13	8
2017	Varna Challenge Cup			2nd place, silver medalist(s)			2nd place, silver medalist(s)
2017	World Championships			7			
2018	Elite Canada		6	1st place, gold medalist(s)		6	2nd place, silver medalist(s)
2018	International Gymnix		5	1st place, gold medalist(s)		9	4
2018	Commonwealth Games	1st place, gold medalist(s)		1st place, gold medalist(s)			3rd place, bronze medalist(s)
2018	Canadian Championships			1st place, gold medalist(s)		11	1st place, gold medalist(s)
2018	World Championships	4		2nd place, silver medalist(s)			
2019	Canadian Championships			1st place, gold medalist(s)		5	4
2019	Pan American Games	2nd place, silver medalist(s)		3rd place, bronze medalist(s)			
2019	World Championships	7		4			
2021	Canadian Championships		11	1st place, gold medalist(s)	21	22	11
2021	Olympic Games	10		7			
2022
2022	Pan American Championships	3rd place, bronze medalist(s)		5			
2022	World Championships	(bronze) (Note: Olsen was the team CAN alternate)					
2023	RomGym Trophy			1st place, gold medalist(s)		8	6
2024	DTB Pokal Team Challenge	4					
2024	City of Jesolo Trophy	4		3rd place, bronze medalist(s)			
2024	Olympic Games	5		8			
2025	Osijek World Cup			4			
2025	World Championships			32			

Competitive history of Shallon Olsen at the NCAA level
Year	Event	Team	AA	VT	UB	BB	FX
2019	SEC Championships	3rd place, bronze medalist(s)		10		6	
2021	SEC Championships	1st place, gold medalist(s)		4			
2021	NCAA Championships			5		30	34
