= Cindy Vandenhole =

Belgian artistic gymnast (born 1999)

- Full name: Cindy Ann Vandenhole
- Born: 8 March 1999 (age 27) Kortrijk, Belgium

Gymnastics career
- Discipline: Women's artistic gymnastics
- Country represented: Belgium (2013–2016)
- Club: Vaste Vuist
- Retired: 28 June 2017

Cindy Ann Vandenhole (born 8 March 1999) is a Belgian former artistic gymnast. She is the 2015 Belgian all-around champion. She competed at the 2015 World Championships and was a team alternate for the 2016 Summer Olympics.

== Gymnastics career ==
Vandenhole began gymnastics when she was six years old. She joined the junior national team in 2013. She competed at the 2013 European Youth Olympic Festival and finished ninth with the Belgian team. Individually, she finished 17th in the all-around final. She was selected to compete at the Junior European Championships alongside Nina Derwael, Axelle Klinckaert, Jelle Beullens, and Rune Hermans, and they finished sixth in the team competition.

Vandenhole became age-eligible for senior competitions in 2015. She won the all-around title at the 2015 Belgian Championships. She then represented Belgium at the 2015 European Games and helped the team finish tenth. She competed at the World Championships alongside Laura Waem, Lisa Verschueren, Julie Croket, Rune Hermans, and Gaelle Mys. They finished 11th as a team and qualified for the 2016 Olympic Test Event.

Vandenhole was the alternate for the team that competed at the 2016 Olympic Test Event and earned a team berth to the Olympic Games for the first time since 1948. She returned to the team at the European Championships, and the Belgian team finished ninth in the qualification round. She was chosen as the non-traveling alternate for the Olympic team, but after Axelle Klinckaert's injury, she was moved up to first alternate and traveled to Rio de Janeiro with the team.

Vandenhole retired from gymnastics on 28 June 2017.
