= Gymnastics at the 2015 Pan American Games – Women's balance beam =

Women's balance beam at the 2015 Pan American Games
- Venue: Toronto Coliseum
- Dates: July 15
- Competitors: 45
- Winning score: 15.050

Medalists
Gold medal	Ellie Black	Canada
Silver medal	Megan Skaggs	United States
Bronze medal	Victoria-Kayen Woo	Canada

The women's balance beam gymnastic event at the 2015 Pan American Games was held on July 15 at the Toronto Coliseum.

== Schedule ==
All times are Eastern Standard Time (UTC-3).

Date	Time	Round
July 15, 2015	13:35	Final

== Results ==
=== Qualification ===
Amelia Hundley of the United States finished in 7th and Isabela Onyshko of Canada finished in 9th but did they not progress to the final because only two athletes per country can qualify for finals.

Position	Gymnast	Balance beam	Notes
1	Flávia Saraiva (BRA)	14.550	Q
2	Rachel Gowey (USA)	14.500	Q
3	Ana Sofía Gómez (GUA)	14.350	Q
4	Ellie Black (CAN)	14.100	Q
5	Megan Skaggs (USA)	14.050	Q
6	Julie Kim Sinmon (BRA)	13.750	Q
7	Victoria-Kayen Woo (CAN)	13.500	Q
8	Jessica López (VEN)	13.400	Q
9	Dovelis Torres (CUB)	13.150	R
10	Marcia Videaux (CUB)	12.950	R
11	Amaranta Torres (MEX)	12.950	R

=== Final ===
Position	Gymnast	Balance beam	Notes
1st place, gold medalist(s)	Ellie Black (CAN)	15.050	
2nd place, silver medalist(s)	Megan Skaggs (USA)	14.050	
3rd place, bronze medalist(s)	Victoria-Kayen Woo (CAN)	13.650	
4	Julie Kim Sinmon (BRA)	13.575	
5	Flávia Saraiva (BRA)	13.225	
6	Jessica López (VEN)	12.775	
7	Ana Sofía Gómez (GUA)	12.325	
8	Rachel Gowey (USA)	11.625	
