= 2014 International Gymnix =

- Location: Montreal, Canada
- Dates: March 6-9

The 2014 International Gymnix competition was a competition held in Montreal, Canada in early March 2014 (from March 6 to March 9). It was the 23rd edition of the International Gymnix. The nations that had placed in the top 16 places in the 2011 World Artistic Gymnastics Championships were invited to the tournament, with Belgium, Italy, Romania and Russia joining it. The Junior International Cup was open to athletes born between 1999 and 2001. Russia won the team event. Kirsten Peterman placed third on vault after her 2013 win, while Angelina Melnikova won her first international medal, placing second on all-around in the Junior Cup.

== Medal winners ==
=== Senior International Cup ===
Event	Gold	Silver	Bronze
Individual all-around	Ellie Black (CAN)	Aleeza Yu (CAN)	Stefanie Merkle (CAN)
Vault	Hélody Cyrenne (CAN)	Laurie Denommée (CAN)	Kirsten Peterman (CAN)
Uneven Bars	Isabela Onyshko (CAN)	Lisa Verschueren (BEL)	Ellie Black (CAN)
Balance Beam	Gaelle Mys (BEL)	Madeline McLellan (CAN)	Ellie Black (CAN)
Floor Exercise	Ellie Black (CAN)	Stefanie Merkle (CAN)	Aleeza Yu (CAN)

=== Junior International Cup ===
Event	Gold	Silver	Bronze
Team all-around	Russia	Canada	Italy
Individual all-around	Rose-Kaying Woo (CAN)	Angelina Melnikova (RUS)	Shallon Olsen (CAN)
Vault	Shallon Olsen (CAN)	Daria Skrypnik (RUS)	Anastasia Ilyankova (RUS)
Uneven Bars	Daria Skrypnik (RUS)	Angelina Melnikova (RUS)	Rose-Kaying Woo (CAN)
Balance Beam	Rose-Kaying Woo (CAN)	Anastasia Ilyankova (RUS)	Stefania Orzu (ROU)
Floor Exercise	Rose-Kaying Woo (CAN)	Shallon Olsen (CAN)	Angelina Melnikova (RUS)

== Results ==
=== Senior Cup ===
==== All-around ====
Position	Gymnast	Vault (gymnastics)	Uneven bars	Balance beam	Floor (gymnastics)	Total
1st place, gold medalist(s)	Ellie Black (CAN)	14.525	13.900	14.150	12.825	55.400
2nd place, silver medalist(s)	Aleeza Yu (CAN)	15.300	13.175	13.225	12.850	54.550
3rd place, bronze medalist(s)	Stefanie Merkle (CAN)	14.150	12.100	13.300	13.775	53.325
4	Isabela Onyshko (CAN)	14.100	12.875	12.925	13.325	53.225
5	Lisa Verschueren (BEL)	14.050	13.625	12.675	12.775	53.125
6	Laura Waem (BEL)	13.800	12.225	13.375	13.150	52.550
7	Victoria-Kayen Woo (CAN)	14.150	13.050	11.950	13.075	52.225
8	Jordyn Pedersen (CAN)	14.000	12.925	11.825	13.125	51.875
9	Natalie Vaculik (CAN)	14.475	12.000	12.825	12.500	51.800
10	Gaelle Mys (BEL)	13.975	13.300	11.850	12.550	51.675
11	Lexy Ramler (USA)	13.950	11.825	12.950	12.925	51.650
12	Madison Copiak (CAN)	14.125	12.575	11.950	12.250	50.900
12	Vivi Babalis (CAN)	13.375	12.100	13.325	12.100	59.900
14	Jade Chrobok (CAN)	13.275	11.075	12.325	13.725	50.400
15	Hélody Cyrenne (CAN)	13.975	12.175	11.750	12.475	50.375
16	Mariana Colussi-Pelaez (CAN)	13.925	11.775	12.575	11.600	49.875
17	Ellen Haavisto (SWE)	12.925	12.300	12.400	12.050	49.675
18	Kirsten Peterman (CAN)	14.025	11.375	12.375	11.875	49.650
19	Latalia Bevan (WAL)	12.625	11.775	13.350	11.875	49.625
20	Emmy Haavisto (SWE)	13.075	12.925	11.850	11.500	49.350
21	Madeline McLellan (CAN)	13.350	11.200	13.450	11.275	49.275
22	Maisie Methuen (WAL)	12.875	11.625	11.900	12.675	49.075
23	Casey Carvalho (CAN)	12.950	12.000	13.250	10.350	48.550
24	Brittany Robertson (NZL)	13.200	11.075	11.900	12.150	48.325
25	Anna Tempero (NZL)	13.475	11.100	11.175	12.275	48.025
26	Hanna Malloch (NZL)	13.075	10.575	11.375	11.750	46.775
27	Mackenzie Slee (NZL)	13.800	9.850	9.675	12.450	45.775
28	Holly Jones (WAL)	12.825	8.950	10.775	12.550	45.100
29	Ivy Lu (CAN)	——	12.200	13.125	——	25.325
30	Elizabeth Beddoe (WAL)	——	11.025	13.425	——	24.450
31	Laurie Denommée (CAN)	13.250	——	9.975	——	23.225
32	Sydney Soloski (CAN)	——	——	——	10.375	10.375

==== Vault ====
Rank	Gymnast	D Score	E Score	Pen.	Score 1	D Score	E Score	Pen.	Score 2	Total
1st place, gold medalist(s)	Hélody Cyrenne (CAN)	5.0	8.900		13.900	4.6	9.1		13.700	13.800
2nd place, silver medalist(s)	Laurie Denommée (CAN)	5.0	8.825	0.1	13.725	5.0	8.675		13.675	13.700
3rd place, bronze medalist(s)	Kirsten Peterman (CAN)	5.3	8.800	0.1	14.000	4.6	8.775		13.375	13.687
4	Jordyn Pedersen (CAN)	5.0	8.875		13.875	4.6	8.600		13.200	13.537
5	Holly Jones (WAL)	4.2	8.800		13.000	4.0	9.025	2.0	11.025	12.012
Rank	Gymnast	Vault 1				Vault 2				Total

==== Uneven bars ====
Rank	Gymnast	D Score	E Score	Pen.	Total
1st place, gold medalist(s)	Isabela Onyshko (CAN)	6.1	7.825		13.925
2nd place, silver medalist(s)	Lisa Verschueren (BEL)	5.6	8.250		13.850
3rd place, bronze medalist(s)	Ellie Black (CAN)	5.4	8.150		13.550
4	Aleeza Yu (CAN)	5.1	8.325		13.425
5	Victoria-Kayen Woo (CAN)	5.3	8.075		13.375
6	Jordyn Pedersen (CAN)	5.0	8.250		13.250
7	Ellen Haavisto (SWE)	5.1	7.600		12.700
7	Laura Waem (BEL)	5.7	7.000		12.700
9	Emmy Haavisto (SWE)	5.1	7.050		12.150
10	Madison Copiak (CAN)	4.1	6.900		11.000

==== Balance beam ====
Rank	Gymnast	D Score	E Score	Pen.	Total
1st place, gold medalist(s)	Gaelle Mys (BEL)	5.9	7.950		13.850
2nd place, silver medalist(s)	Madeline McLellan (CAN)	5.2	8.625		13.825
3rd place, bronze medalist(s)	Ellie Black (CAN)	6.4	7.150		13.550
4	Vivi Babalis (CAN)	5.5	7.575	0.1	12.975
5	Elizabeth Beddoe (WAL)	5.2	7.725		12.925
6	Latalia Bevan (WAL)	5.0	7.750		12.750
7	Ivy Lu (CAN)	5.5	7.050		12.550
8	Laura Waem (BEL)	5.6	6.725		12.325
9	Casey Carvalho (CAN)	5.5	6.775		12.275
10	Stefanie Merkle (CAN)	5.4	6.200		11.600

==== Floor exercise ====
Rank	Gymnast	D Score	E Score	Pen.	Total
1st place, gold medalist(s)	Ellie Black (CAN)	5.7	8.325		14.025
2nd place, silver medalist(s)	Stefanie Merkle (CAN)	5.5	8.175		13.675
3rd place, bronze medalist(s)	Aleeza Yu (CAN)	5.4	8.075		13.475
4	Victoria-Kayen Woo (CAN)	4.9	8.450		13.350
5	Jade Chrobok (CAN)	5.3	7.950		13.250
6	Maisie Methuen (WAL)	5.0	8.025		13.025
7	Jordyn Pedersen (CAN)	5.1	7.800		12.900
8	Isabela Onyshko (CAN)	5.5	7.675	0.3	12.875
9	Lexy Ramler (USA)	5.0	7.200		12.200
10	Mackenzie Slee (NZL)	5.2	5.400		10.600

=== Junior Cup ===
==== Team Final ====
Rank	Team	Vault (gymnastics)	Uneven bars	Balance beam	Floor (gymnastics)	Total
1st place, gold medalist(s)	Russia	41.466 (2)	42.325 (1)	40.950 (2)	40.575 (1T)	165.361
1st place, gold medalist(s)	Angelina Melnikova	13.566	14.475	13.475	13.775	165.361
1st place, gold medalist(s)	Daria Skrypnik	14.033	14.200	13.150	13.800	165.361
1st place, gold medalist(s)	Anastasia Ilyankova	13.700	13.650	13.775	12.650	165.361
1st place, gold medalist(s)	Ekaterina Sokova	13.733	13.275	13.700	13.000	165.361
2nd place, silver medalist(s)	Canada	42.832 (1)	40.350 (2)	41.525 (1)	40.575 (1T)	165.282
2nd place, silver medalist(s)	Rose-Kaying Woo	13.766	13.900	14.050	13.725	165.282
2nd place, silver medalist(s)	Shallon Olsen	14.966	12.950	13.825	13.475	165.282
2nd place, silver medalist(s)	Audrey Rousseau	13.733	13.425	13.650	13.375	165.282
2nd place, silver medalist(s)	Megan Roberts	14.100	13.025	13.050	13.350	165.282
3rd place, bronze medalist(s)	Italy	40.633 (3)	38.925 (4)	39.675 (4)	39.625 (5)	158.858
3rd place, bronze medalist(s)	Pilar Rubagotti	13.900	12.550	13.450	13.425	158.858
3rd place, bronze medalist(s)	Iosra Abdelaziz	13.500	13.250	13.025	13.050	158.858
3rd place, bronze medalist(s)	Chiara Imeraj	12.966	13.075	13.200	13.025	158.858
3rd place, bronze medalist(s)	Alice Linguerri	13.233	12.600	11.725	13.150	158.858
4	Belgium	39.132 (6)	39.650 (3)	39.700 (3)	39.850 (3)	158.332
4	Rune Hermans	13.066	13.625	13.700	13.500	158.332
4	Axelle Klinckaert	13.633	12.400	12.075	13.325	158.332
4	Nina Derwael	11.966	13.625	13.175	12.050	158.332
4	Senna Deriks	12.433	11.275	12.825	13.025	158.332
5	Romania	40.533 (4)	33.825 (6)	39.050 (5)	39.725 (4)	153.133
5	Stefania Orzu	13.900	11.275	13.425	12.775	153.133
5	Dora Vulcan	14.000	10.250	13.075	13.300	153.133
5	Maria Holbura	12.433	11.400	12.500	13.325	153.133
5	Adela Florea	12.633	11.150	12.550	13.100	153.133
6	Mixed Team	40.399 (5)	34.950 (5)	36.425 (6)	38.775 (6)	150.549
6	Meaghan Ruttan	13.366	12.475	11.650	12.850	150.549
6	Jelle Beullens	13.033	11.025	12.200	13.125	150.549
6	Nathalie Wuytack	13.500	10.675	12.550	12.425	150.549
6	Millie Williamson	13.533	11.450	12.550	13.100	150.549

==== All-around ====
Position	Gymnast	Vault (gymnastics)	Uneven bars	Balance beam	Floor (gymnastics)	Total
1st place, gold medalist(s)	Rose-Kaying Woo (CAN)	13.766	13.900	14.050	13.725	55.441
2nd place, silver medalist(s)	Angelina Melnikova (RUS)	13.566	14.475	13.475	13.775	55.291
3rd place, bronze medalist(s)	Shallon Olsen (CAN)	14.966	12.950	13.825	13.475	55.216
4	Daria Skrypnik (RUS)	14.033	14.200	13.150	13.800	55.183
5	Audrey Rousseau (CAN)	13.733	13.425	13.650	13.375	54.183
6	Rune Hermans (BEL)	13.066	13.625	13.700	13.500	53.891
7	Anastasia Ilyankova (RUS)	13.700	13.650	13.775	12.650	53.775
8	Ekaterina Sokova (RUS)	13.733	13.275	13.700	13.000	53.708
9	Megan Roberts (CAN)	14.100	13.025	13.050	13.350	53.525
10	Pilar Rubagotti (ITA)	13.900	12.550	13.450	13.425	53.325
11	Iosra Abdelaziz (ITA)	13.500	13.250	13.025	13.050	52.825
12	Chiara Imeraj (ITA)	12.966	13.075	13.200	13.025	52.266
13	Axelle Klinckaert (BEL)	13.633	12.400	12.075	13.325	51.433
14	Stefania Orzu (ROU)	13.900	11.275	13.425	12.775	51.375
15	Nina Derwael (BEL)	11.966	13.625	13.175	12.050	50.816
16	Alice Linguerri (ITA)	13.233	12.600	11.725	13.150	50.708
17	Dora Vulcan (ROU)	14.000	10.250	13.075	13.300	50.625
18	Meaghan Ruttan (CAN)	13.366	12.475	11.650	12.850	50.341
19	Maria Holbura (ROU)	12.433	11.400	12.500	13.325	49.658
20	Senna Deriks (BEL)	12.433	11.275	12.825	13.025	49.558
21	Millie Williamson (NZL)	13.533	11.450	11.675	12.800	49.458
22	Adela Florea] (ROU)	12.633	11.150	12.550	13.100	49.433
23	Jelle Beullens (BEL)	13.033	11.025	12.200	13.125	49.383
24	Nathalie Wuytack (BEL)	13.500	10.675	12.550	12.425	49.150
25	Sydney Townsend (CAN)	-	12.650	-	11.900	24.550

==== Vault ====
Rank	Gymnast	D Score	E Score	Pen.	Score 1	D Score	E Score	Pen.	Score 2	Total
1st place, gold medalist(s)	Shallon Olsen (CAN)	5.8	9.050		14.850	5.0	9.150		14.150	14.500
2nd place, silver medalist(s)	Daria Skrypnik (RUS)	5.0	9.100		14.100	5.8	8.925		14.725	14.412
3rd place, bronze medalist(s)	Anastasia Ilyankova (RUS)	5.0	9.025	0.1	13.925	4.8	9.250		14.050	13.987
4	Dora Vulcan (ROU)	5.0	9.025		14.025	4.4	9.225		13.625	13.825
5	Rose-Kaying Woo (CAN)	5.0	8.850		13.850	4.6	9.050		13.650	13.750
6	Iosra Abdelaziz (ITA)	5.0	9.000		14.000	4.4	9.125	0.1	13.425	13.712
7	Pilar Rubagotti (ITA)	5.0	9.025		14.025	4.0	8.950		12.950	13.487
8	Axelle Klinckaert (BEL)	4.6	8.875		13.475	0.0	0.000		0.000	6.737
Rank	Gymnast	Vault 1				Vault 2				Total

==== Uneven Bars ====
Rank	Gymnast	D Score	E Score	Pen.	Total
1st place, gold medalist(s)	Daria Skrypnik (RUS)	6.0	8.200		14.200
2nd place, silver medalist(s)	Angelina Melnikova (RUS)	5.9	8.275		14.175
3rd place, bronze medalist(s)	Rose-Kaying Woo (CAN)	5.4	8.400		13.800
4	Audrey Rousseau (CAN)	5.3	7.875		13.175
4	Rune Hermans (BEL)	5.3	7.875		13.175
6	Chiara Imeraj (ITA)	5.0	8.100		13.100
7	Iosra Abdelaziz (ITA)	5.1	7.975		13.075
8	Nina Derwael (BEL)	5.5	6.750		12.250

==== Balance beam ====
Rank	Gymnast	D Score	E Score	Pen.	Total
1st place, gold medalist(s)	Rose-Kaying Woo (CAN)	5.7	8.425		14.125
2nd place, silver medalist(s)	Anastasia Ilyankova (RUS)	5.4	8.475		13.875
3rd place, bronze medalist(s)	Stefania Orzu (ROU)	5.1	8.275		13.375
4	Pilar Rubagotti (ITA)	5.5	7.825		13.325
5	Chiara Imeraj (ITA)	5.2	7.975		13.175
6	Ekaterina Sokova (RUS)	5.8	7.325		13.125
7	Shallon Olsen (CAN)	4.9	7.700		12.600
8	Rune Hermans (BEL)	5.4	6.950		12.350

==== Floor exercise ====
Rank	Gymnast	D Score	E Score	Pen.	Total
1st place, gold medalist(s)	Rose-Kaying Woo (CAN)	5.3	8.450		13.750
2nd place, silver medalist(s)	Shallon Olsen (CAN)	5.6	7.800		13.400
3rd place, bronze medalist(s)	Angelina Melnikova (RUS)	5.2	8.125		13.325
4	Axelle Klinckaert (BEL)	5.2	8.050		13.250
5	Rune Hermans (BEL)	5.3	7.925		13.225
5	Maria Holbura (ROU)	5.3	7.925		13.225
7	Pilar Rubagotti (ITA)	5.3	7.900		13.200
8	Daria Skrypnik (RUS)	4.8	8.125		12.925
