= 2014 Pacific Rim Gymnastics Championships – Women's Artistic Gymnastics =

The Women's Artistic Gymnastics competition for the 2014 Pacific Rim Gymnastics Championships was held on 9 April, 11 April, & 12 April 2014 at the Richmond Olympic Oval. The juniors and seniors competed together in the team final and individual all-around, but competed separately during the event finals. The team final and all-around competition were held on 9 April, the junior event finals were held on 11 April, and the senior event finals were held on 12 April.

== Team ==
Results

Rank	Team	Vault (gymnastics)	Uneven bars	Balance beam	Floor (gymnastics)	Total
1st place, gold medalist(s)	United States	61.450	58.750	58.050	58.750	237.000
1st place, gold medalist(s)	Elizabeth Price	15.700	15.000	14.100	15.100	237.000
1st place, gold medalist(s)	Kyla Ross	15.300	14.800	14.450	14.150	237.000
1st place, gold medalist(s)	Peyton Ernst		14.600			237.000
1st place, gold medalist(s)	Nia Dennis	15.150			14.750	237.000
1st place, gold medalist(s)	Bailie Key	15.300	14.350	14.850	14.750	237.000
1st place, gold medalist(s)	Norah Flatley			14.650		237.000
2nd place, silver medalist(s)	Canada	58.500	53.500	55.150	55.550	222.700
2nd place, silver medalist(s)	Ellie Black	14.700	13.950	15.000	13.400	222.700
2nd place, silver medalist(s)	Aleeza Yu	15.000	12.800	14.050	13.500	222.700
2nd place, silver medalist(s)	Maegan Chant		12.900	13.600		222.700
2nd place, silver medalist(s)	Rose-Kaying Woo	14.100	13.850		14.100	222.700
2nd place, silver medalist(s)	Shallon Olsen	14.700			14.550	222.700
2nd place, silver medalist(s)	Megan Roberts			12.500		222.700
3rd place, bronze medalist(s)	China	55.750	56.300	57.400	52.950	222.400
3rd place, bronze medalist(s)	Xie Yufen	14.000	14.400	13.900	13.100	222.400
3rd place, bronze medalist(s)	Luo Huan	14.050	14.700	14.100	13.450	222.400
3rd place, bronze medalist(s)	Liu Tingting	13.950	13.850	14.800	13.600	222.400
3rd place, bronze medalist(s)	Zhou Linlin	13.750	13.350	13.600		222.400
3rd place, bronze medalist(s)	Liu Ying				12.800	222.400
4	Japan	56.150	53.800	52.050	52.050	214.050
4	Chinami Otaki	14.050	14.350	13.150	12.500	214.050
4	Mai Murakami	14.000	13.200	13.100	13.200	214.050
4	Ayu Koike	14.100	13.250	12.950	13.450	214.050
4	Marina Kawasaki	14.000		12.850	12.900	214.050
4	Yurika Yumoto		13.000			214.050
5	Australia	55.000	53.750	49.250	51.700	209.700
5	Georgia-Rose Brown	14.250	14.300	13.500	13.000	209.700
5	Kiara Munteanu	14.050	13.700	11.700	12.800	209.700
5	Aya Meggs	13.800	12.950		12.800	209.700
5	Yasmin Collier			11.550		209.700
5	Emily Whitehead			12.500	13.100	209.700
5	Darcy Norman	12.900	12.800			209.700
6	Chinese Taipei	49.850	34.250	43.850	42.500	170.450
6	Yu-Ji Lo	13.850	7.450	12.300	12.250	170.450
6	Lin Tseng-Ning	12.700	10.850	10.850	10.350	170.450
6	Wu Jhih-Han	12.600	8.300	11.550	10.200	170.450
6	Li-Ya Huang	10.700	7.650	9.150	9.700	170.450
7	Costa Rica	35.650	33.300	38.650	46.900	154.500
7	Karina Regidor Gomez	12.250	8.800	10.000	11.450	154.500
7	Ivanka Victory Arroyo	12.650	7.800	11.400	12.550	154.500
7	Heika Del Sol Salas Castro	10.750	9.400	9.200	11.350	154.500
7	Mariana Andrade Gomez	0.000	7.300	8.050	11.550	154.500

== Senior ==
=== All-Around ===
Results

Rank	Gymnast	Vault (gymnastics)	Uneven bars	Balance beam	Floor (gymnastics)	Total
1st place, gold medalist(s)	Elizabeth Price; United States	15.700	15.000	14.100	15.100	59.900
2nd place, silver medalist(s)	Kyla Ross; United States	15.300	14.800	14.450	14.150	58.700
3rd place, bronze medalist(s)	Ellie Black; Canada	14.700	13.950	15.000	13.400	57.100
4	Xie Yufen; China	14.000	14.400	13.900	13.100	55.400
5	Aleeza Yu; Canada	15.000	12.800	14.050	13.500	55.350
6	Georgia-Rose Brown; Australia	14.250	14.300	13.500	13.000	55.050
7	Chinami Otaki; Japan	14.050	14.350	13.150	12.500	54.050
8	Maegan Chant; Canada	14.050	12.900	13.600	13.250	53.800
9	Mai Murakami; Japan	14.000	13.200	13.100	13.200	53.500
10	Kiara Munteanu; Australia	14.050	13.700	11.700	12.800	52.250
11	Charlotte Sullivan; New Zealand	13.500	11.900	12.350	13.450	51.200
12	Courtney McGregor; New Zealand	14.300	10.600	11.850	13.500	50.250
13	Valentina Brostella; Panama	13.400	10.600	11.150	13.050	48.200
14	Janessa Min Yi Dai; Singapore	13.000	11.250	9.050	12.850	46.150
15	Yu-Ji Lo; Chinese Taipei	13.850	7.450	12.300	12.250	45.850
16	Anna Tempero; New Zealand	12.800	9.800	10.250	12.250	45.100
17	Lin Tseng-Ning; Chinese Taipei	12.700	10.850	10.850	10.350	44.750
18	Peyton Ernst; United States	15.050	14.600	14.050	0.000	43.700
19	Wu Jhih-Han; Chinese Taipei	12.600	8.300	11.550	10.200	42.650
20	Karina Regidor Gomez; Costa Rica	12.250	8.800	10.000	11.450	42.500
21	Isabella Amado; Panama	13.850	0.000	12.500	13.300	39.650
22	Ana Victoria De Leon; Panama	12.750	9.450	10.250	0.000	32.450
23	Cristina Onofre; Philippines	12.550	0.000	6.800	10.600	29.950
24	Hiu Ying Angel Wong; Hong Kong	13.800	0.00	10.550	0.000	24.350
25	Ariana Oreggo; Peru	0.000	0.000	11.600	12.700	24.300
26	Jing Ying Joey Tam; Singapore	12.600	0.000	11.250	0.000	23.850
27	Yuen Ying Ng; Hong Kong	11.850	0.000	10.400	0.000	22.250
28	Ka Man Leung; Hong Kong	12.350	0.000	9.200	0.000	21.550

=== Vault ===
Results

Rank	Gymnast	D Score	E Score	Pen.	Total
1st place, gold medalist(s)	Ellie Black; Canada	5.50	8.862	0.00	14.362
2nd place, silver medalist(s)	Courtney McGregor; New Zealand	5.80	8.512	0.00	14.312
3rd place, bronze medalist(s)	Maegan Chant; Canada	5.20	9.087	0.00	14.287
4	Isabella Amado; Panama	5.00	8.737	0.00	13.737
5	Lo Yu-Ju; Chinese Taipei	5.00	8.400	0.00	13.400
6	Valentina Brostella; Panama	4.60	8.700	0.00	13.300
7	Leung Ka Man; Hong Kong	4.40	8.087	0.00	12.487
8	Ling Tseng-Ning; Chinese Taipei	4.00	8.437	0.00	12.437

=== Uneven Bars ===
Results

Rank	Gymnast	D Score	E Score	Pen.	Total
1st place, gold medalist(s)	Elizabeth Price; United States	6.4	8.200	0.00	14.600
2nd place, silver medalist(s)	Kyla Ross; United States	5.9	8.450	0.00	14.350
3rd place, bronze medalist(s)	Georgia-Rose Brown; Australia	6.1	8.050	0.00	14.150
4	Xie Yufen; China	6.0	8.050	0.00	14.050
5	Ellie Black; Canada	5.5	8.400	0.00	13.900
6	Kiara Munteanu; Australia	5.7	8.075	0.00	13.775
7	Mai Murakami; Japan	4.9	8.125	0.00	13.025
8	Chinami Otaki; Japan	5.4	7.050	0.00	12.450

=== Balance Beam ===
Results

Rank	Gymnast	D Score	E Score	Pen.	Total
1st place, gold medalist(s)	Kyla Ross; United States	6.1	8.925	0.00	15.025
2nd place, silver medalist(s)	Xie Yufen; China	6.2	8.700	0.00	14.900
3rd place, bronze medalist(s)	Elizabeth Price; United States	6.0	8.625	0.00	14.625
4	Chinami Otaki; Japan	5.2	8.625	0.00	13.825
5	Aleeza Yu; Canada	5.9	8.550	0.00	13.450
6	Ellie Black; Canada	5.8	7.575	0.00	13.375
7	Mai Murakami; Japan	5.2	7.575	0.00	12.775
8	Georgia-Rose Brown; Australia	5.5	7.150	0.00	12.650

=== Floor ===
Results

Rank	Gymnast	D Score	E Score	Pen.	Total
1st place, gold medalist(s)	Elizabeth Price; United States	6.0	8.950	0.00	14.950
2nd place, silver medalist(s)	Kyla Ross; United States	5.5	9.000	0.00	14.500
3rd place, bronze medalist(s)	Aleeza Yu; Canada	5.4	8.575	0.00	13.975
4	Ellie Black; Canada	5.7	8.225	0.00	13.925
5	Isabella Amado; Panama	5.0	8.575	0.00	13.575
6	Mai Murakami; Japan	5.3	8.125	0.00	13.425
7	Charlotte Sullivan; New Zealand	5.5	7.775	0.00	13.275
8	Courtney McGregor; New Zealand	5.6	7.625	0.00	13.225

== Junior ==
=== All-Around ===
Results

Rank	Gymnast	Vault (gymnastics)	Uneven bars	Balance beam	Floor (gymnastics)	Total
1st place, gold medalist(s)	Bailie Key; United States	15.300	14.350	14.850	14.750	59.250
2nd place, silver medalist(s)	Nia Dennis; United States	15.150	14.000	14.050	14.750	57.950
3*	Norah Flatley; United States	14.050	14.200	14.650	13.950	56.850
3rd place, bronze medalist(s)	Luo Huan; China	14.050	14.700	14.100	13.450	56.300
5	Liu Tingting; China	13.950	13.850	14.800	13.600	56.200
6	Rose-Kaying Woo; Canada	14.100	13.850	13.600	14.100	55.650
7	Shallon Olsen; Canada	14.700	13.350	11.900	14.550	54.500
8	Zhou Linlin; China	13.750	13.350	13.600	12.650	54.350
9	Ayu Koike; Japan	14.100	13.250	12.950	13.450	53.750
10	Marina Kawasaki; Japan	14.000	12.750	12.850	12.900	52.500
11	Megan Roberts; Canada	13.900	11.800	12.500	14.100	52.300
12	Aya Meggs; Australia	13.800	12.950	10.850	12.800	50.400
13	Yurika Yumoto; Japan	13.550	13.000	10.650	12.100	49.300
14	Yasmin Collier; Australia	12.350	12.700	11.550	11.900	48.500
15	Ivanka Victory Arroyo; Costa Rica	12.650	7.800	11.400	12.550	44.400
16	Heika Del Sol Salas Castro; Costa Rica	10.750	9.400	9.200	11.350	40.700
17	Katrina Marie Evangelista; Philippines	12.700	6.650	10.950	10.000	40.300
18	Emily Whitehead; Australia	0.000	12.900	12.500	13.100	38.500
19	Liu Ying; China	0.000	13.050	12.500	12.800	38.350
20	Li-Ya Huang; Chinese Taipei	10.700	7.650	9.150	9.700	37.200
21	Darcy Norman; Australia	12.900	12.800	11.050	0.000	36.750
22	Mariana Andrade Gomez; Costa Rica	0.000	7.300	8.050	11.550	26.900

*Norah Flatley scored the 3rd highest score of the competition but medals are limited to two per country

=== Vault ===
Results

Rank	Gymnast	D Score	E Score	Pen.	Total
1st place, gold medalist(s)	Bailie Key; United States	5.8	9.175	0.00	14.975
2nd place, silver medalist(s)	Nia Dennis; United States	5.8	9.100	0.00	14.900
3rd place, bronze medalist(s)	Shallon Olsen; Canada	5.8	9.000	0.00	14.800
4	Ayu Koike; Japan	5.8	8.550	0.00	14.350
5	Marina Kawasaki; Japan	5.0	9.175	0.00	14.175
6	Rose-Kaying Woo; Canada	5.0	9.075	0.00	14.075
7	Liu Tingting; China	5.0	9.050	0.00	14.050
8	Luo Huan; China	5.0	8.975	0.00	13.975

=== Uneven Bars ===
Results

Rank	Gymnast	D Score	E Score	Pen.	Total
1st place, gold medalist(s)	Luo Huan; China	6.2	8.500	0.00	14.700
2nd place, silver medalist(s)	Bailie Key; United States	5.6	8.800	0.00	14.400
3rd place, bronze medalist(s)	Liu Tingting; China	5.7	8.600	0.00	14.300
4	Norah Flatley; United States	5.5	8.600	0.00	14.100
5	Rose-Kaying Woo; Canada	5.4	8.025	0.00	13.425
6	Shallon Olsen; Canada	5.4	7.975	0.00	13.375
7	Ayu Koike; Japan	4.9	8.375	0.00	13.275
7	Yurika Yumoto; Japan	4.9	8.375	0.00	13.275

=== Balance Beam ===
Results

Rank	Gymnast	D Score	E Score	Pen.	Total
1st place, gold medalist(s)	Norah Flatley; United States	6.3	8.550	0.00	14.850
2nd place, silver medalist(s)	Bailie Key; United States	6.2	8.600	0.00	14.800
3rd place, bronze medalist(s)	Zhou Linlin; China	5.9	8.300	0.00	14.200
4	Marina Kawasaki; Japan	5.4	8.325	0.00	13.725
5	Rose-Kaying Woo; Canada	5.5	7.975	0.00	13.475
6	Ayu Koike; Japan	5.0	8.150	0.00	13.150
7	Liu Tingting; China	5.8	7.225	0.00	13.025
8	Megan Roberts; Canada	4.3	7.675	0.00	11.975

=== Floor ===
Results

Rank	Gymnast	D Score	E Score	Pen.	Total
1st place, gold medalist(s)	Bailie Key; United States	6.0	8.650	0.00	14.650
2nd place, silver medalist(s)	Shallon Olsen; Canada	5.8	8.350	0.00	14.150
3rd place, bronze medalist(s)	Rose-Kaying Woo; Canada	5.3	8.700	0.00	14.000
4	Luo Huan; China	5.1	8.700	0.00	13.800
5	Ayu Koike; Japan	5.2	8.150	0.00	13.350
6	Nia Dennis; United States	5.8	7.450	0.00	13.250
7	Liu Tingting; China	5.2	7.650	0.00	12.850
8	Emily Whitehead; Australia	4.9	7.350	0.00	12.250
