= Axelle Klinckaert =

Belgian artistic gymnast (born 2000)

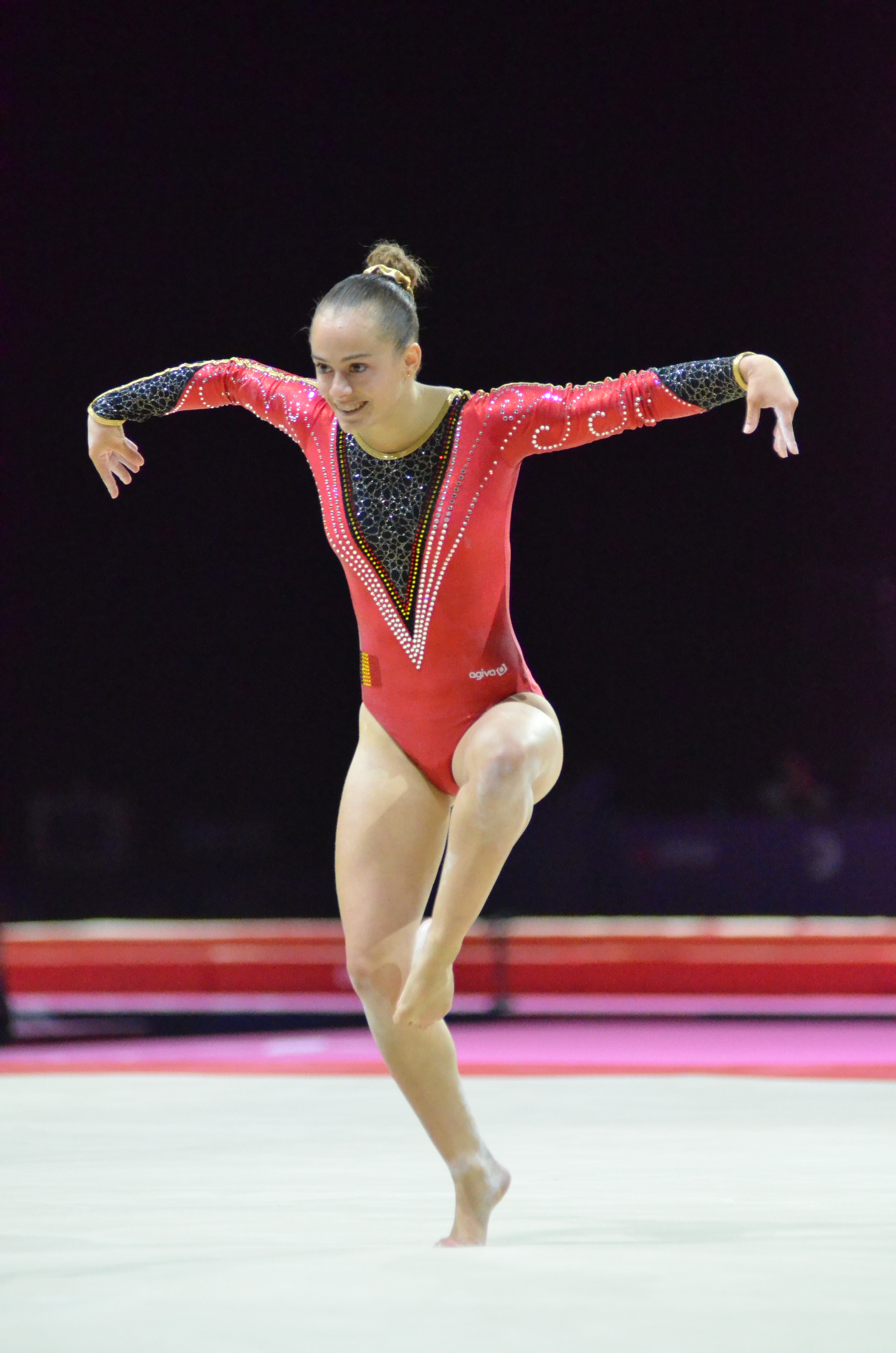
- Klinckaert in 2018

Personal information
- Full name: Axelle Klinckaert
- Born: 28 May 2000 (age 26) Dendermonde, Belgium

Gymnastics career
- Discipline: Women's artistic gymnastics
- Country represented: Belgium
- Club: GymMAX vzw
- Head coach: Yves Kieffer
Medal record
Representing Belgium
European Championships
Bronze medal – third place	2018 Glasgow	Floor exercise
FIG World Cup
Event / 1st / 2nd / 3rd; Apparatus World Cup / 1 / 0 / 0

Axelle Klinckaert (born 28 May 2000) is a Belgian former artistic gymnast. She is the 2018 European floor exercise bronze medalist. She was selected to represent Belgium at the 2016 Summer Olympics but had to withdraw due to a knee injury. As a junior gymnast, she won the all-around silver medal and the balance beam and floor exercise gold medals at the 2015 European Youth Summer Olympic Festival.

== Gymnastics career ==
=== Junior ===
Klinckaert competed at the 2014 International Gymnix in Montreal and helped the Belgian team finish fourth, and she finished fourth on the floor exercise. She won the junior all-around title at the 2014 Belgian Championships. She was selected to compete at the Junior European Championships alongside Nina Derwael, Rune Hermans, Jelle Beullens, and Cindy Vandenhole, and they finished sixth in the team competition. Individually, she qualified for the all-around final and finished 24th. She won a gold medal on the floor exercise at the 2014 Elite Gym Massilia.

Klinckaert competed at the 2015 European Youth Olympic Festival alongside Julie Meyers and Nina Derwael, and they won a silver medal in the team event behind Russia. She also won the silver medal in the individual all-around behind Russia's Daria Skrypnik. In the event finals, she won the gold medals on both the balance beam and floor exercise. She won the all-around title at the 2015 Top Gym Tournament, where she also won gold medals on the vault and floor exercise.

=== Senior ===
Klinckaert became age-eligible for senior competitions in 2016. She made her senior debut at the International Gymnix and won the all-around silver medal behind Canada's Isabela Onyshko. She won gold medals on the floor exercise and in the team event. At the Olympic Test Event, she helped Belgium finish third and qualify as a full team for the Olympic Games for the first time since 1948. She was selected for Belgium's 2016 Olympic team. However, she had to withdraw from the team due to a knee injury and was replaced by Rune Hermans.

Klinckaert only competed on the uneven bars at the 2017 Belgian Championships and won the gold medal. She won a gold medal on the floor exercise at the 2018 Doha World Cup in a three-way tie with Kim Su-jong and Elisa Meneghini. She won the all-around silver medal behind Nina Derwael at the 2018 Belgian Championships. At the 2018 European Championships, the Belgium team qualified in third place to the team final but withdrew to prevent injuries to any team members. She won the bronze medal in the floor exercise final behind Mélanie de Jesus dos Santos and Denisa Golgotă. She advanced into the all-around final at the 2018 World Championships and finished 18th.

== Competitive history ==
Competitive history of Axelle Klinckaert at the junior level
Year	Event	Team	AA	VT	UB	BB	FX
2014	International Gymnix		13	8			4
2014	Belgian Championships		1st place, gold medalist(s)				
2014	Beaumont en Véron Friendly	2nd place, silver medalist(s)	10				
2014	European Championships	6	24			8	7
2014	Elite Gym Massilia	3rd place, bronze medalist(s)	8				1st place, gold medalist(s)
2015	Flanders International Team Challenge	2nd place, silver medalist(s)	57				
2015	European Youth Summer Olympic Festival	2nd place, silver medalist(s)	2nd place, silver medalist(s)			1st place, gold medalist(s)	1st place, gold medalist(s)
2015	Elite Gym Massilia	4	11	2nd place, silver medalist(s)			2nd place, silver medalist(s)
2015	Top Gym		1st place, gold medalist(s)	1st place, gold medalist(s)		11	1st place, gold medalist(s)

Competitive history of Axelle Klinckaert at the senior level
Year	Event	Team	AA	VT	UB	BB	FX
2016	International Gymnix	1st place, gold medalist(s)	2nd place, silver medalist(s)				1st place, gold medalist(s)
2016	Olympic Test Event	3rd place, bronze medalist(s)					
2016	Dutch Championships		3rd place, bronze medalist(s)			6	1st place, gold medalist(s)
2017	Belgian Championships				1st place, gold medalist(s)		
2017	Elite Gym Massilia		10				6
2017	Top 12 Series 1			1st place, gold medalist(s)			
2018	Top 12 Series 3			1st place, gold medalist(s)			
2018	DTB Pokal Team Challenge	1st place, gold medalist(s)					
2018	Doha World Cup						1st place, gold medalist(s)
2018	Belgian Championships		2nd place, silver medalist(s)	1st place, gold medalist(s)	3rd place, bronze medalist(s)		1st place, gold medalist(s)
2018	Heerenveen Friendly	4	8				
2018	European Championships						3rd place, bronze medalist(s)
2018	Varsenare Friendly	1st place, gold medalist(s)	3rd place, bronze medalist(s)				
2018	World Championships		18				
