= Julie Meyers =

Belgian artistic gymnast (born 2000)

- Born: 17 August 2000 (age 26) Hasselt, Belgium

Gymnastics career
- Discipline: Women's artistic gymnastics
- Country represented: Belgium (2013–2018)
- Club: TK Sta Paraat Hasselt
- Retired: 11 November 2018

Julie Meyers (born 17 August 2000) is a Belgian former artistic gymnast. She competed at the 2016 and 2017 European Championships and was an alternate for the 2016 Summer Olympics. Earlier in her career, she won a silver medal at the 2015 European Youth Olympic Festival.

== Gymnastics career ==
=== Junior ===
Meyers finished second in the all-around to Teal Grindle at the 2013 Tournoi International. In the event finals, she finished seventh on the uneven bars and sixth on the floor exercise. At the 2014 Elite Gym Massilia, she finished 41st in the all-around.

Meyers won a bronze medal in the junior all-around at the 2015 Belgian Championships. She competed with Axelle Klinckaert and Nina Derwael at the 2015 European Youth Olympic Festival, and they won a silver medal in the team event behind Russia.

=== Senior ===
Meyers became age-eligible for senior competitions in 2016. She made her senior debut at the International Gymnix and finished seventh in the floor exercise final. She was an alternate for the Belgian team that won an Olympic berth at the 2016 Olympic Test Event. She competed with the Belgian team that finished ninth in the qualification round at the European Championships. She was chosen as an alternate for Belgium's Olympic team.

Meyers helped Belgium finish second to France at the 2017 Sainté Gym Cup, and she won the all-around silver medal. She then competed at the 2017 European Championships but did not advance into any finals. She won the bronze medal in the all-around at the 2017 Belgian Championships.

Meyers was selected to compete at the 2018 European Championships, but she withdrew due to an injury. She came back to all-around competition at the 2018 Varsenare Friendly where she helped Belgium defeat the Netherlands and Romania. She was the team alternate for the 2018 World Championships, and she announced her retirement after the competition.
