= Ernesto Vila =

Uruguayan visual artist (1936–2025)

- Born: 28 June 1936; Montevideo, Uruguay
- Died: 20 August 2025 (aged 89); Montevideo, Uruguay
- Occupation: Visual artist

Ernesto Vila (28 June 1936 – 20 August 2025) was a Uruguayan visual artist. He was a recipient of the Figari Award (2003).

Villa died in Montevideo on 20 August 2025, at the age of 89.
