= Nina Derwael =

Belgian artistic gymnast

- Born: 26 March 2000 (age 26) Sint-Truiden, Limburg, Belgium
- Height: 170 cm (5 ft 7 in)
- Spouse: Thibau Dierickx (m. 2025)

Gymnastics career
- Discipline: Women's artistic gymnastics
- Country represented: Belgium; (2013–2025)
- Club: TK Sta Paraat Hasselt
- Gym: Topsportschool Gent
- Head coach: Ulla Koch
- Former coaches: Marjorie Heuls, Yves Kieffer
- Choreographer: Irina Shadrina
- Eponymous skills: Derwael-Fenton (E): Stalder to Tkatchev with 1/2 turn (Uneven Bars); Derwael (F): Toe-on laid-out Tkatchev with a ½ twist (Uneven Bars)
- Retired: 15 July 2025
Medal record
Women's artistic gymnastics
Representing Belgium
Olympic Games
Gold medal – first place	2020 Tokyo	Uneven bars
World Championships
Gold medal – first place	2018 Doha	Uneven bars
Gold medal – first place	2019 Stuttgart	Uneven bars
Bronze medal – third place	2017 Montreal	Uneven bars
Bronze medal – third place	2022 Liverpool	Uneven bars
European Games
Gold medal – first place	2019 Minsk	Balance beam
European Championships
Gold medal – first place	2017 Cluj-Napoca	Uneven bars
Gold medal – first place	2018 Glasgow	Uneven bars
Gold medal – first place	2025 Leipzig	Uneven bars
Gold medal – first place	2025 Leipzig	Balance beam
Silver medal – second place	2018 Glasgow	Balance beam
FIG World Cup
Event	1st	2nd	3rd
Apparatus World Cup	4	1	2
World Challenge Cup	3	0	0
Total	7	1	2

Nina Derwael (Flemish pronunciation: [ˈninaː dɛrˈʋaːl] or [- dərˈʋaːl]; born 26 March 2000) is a Belgian former artistic gymnast. She is the 2020 Olympic champion, a two-time World champion (2018, 2019), and a three-time European champion (2017, 2018 & 2025) on the uneven bars. She also is the 2019 European Games and 2025 European champion on the balance beam.

She represented Belgium at the 2016, 2020, and 2024 Olympic Games. At the 2020 Olympics, she led the Belgian gymnastics team to their first-ever team final where they finished eighth. Individually she won the gold medal in the uneven bars final, the first Olympic medal of any color for a Belgian female gymnast. She is the first Belgian gymnast to medal at the World Championships, the first to become a World champion, and the first to become a European champion.

== Early life ==
Derwael was born on 26 March 2000 in Sint-Truiden. Her father, Nico Derwael, is a former professional football player, and her mother, Marijke Lammens, played handball and table tennis. She began artistic gymnastics when she was two years old despite her gym's policy that children could only begin when they were three. When she was eleven years old, she moved to Ghent to train at the Belgian national team training centre and enrolled in a boarding school.

== Junior career ==
Derwael made her international debut at the 2013 Elite Gym Massilia in Marseille, France and finished eighth in the all-around, and the Belgian team finished seventh.

=== 2014 ===
Derwael competed at the International Gymnix in Montreal and finished fifteenth in the all-around and eighth in the uneven bars event final. At the Belgian Championships in July, she finished fifth in the all-around. Next she competed at a friendly meet against Romania and France, and the Belgian junior team placed second behind Romania. She was selected to compete at the Junior European Championships alongside Axelle Klinckaert, Rune Hermans, Jelle Beullens, and Cindy Vandenhole, and they finished sixth in the team competition. At the Elite Gym Massilia, she won the bronze medal in the all-around behind Daria Spiridonova and Giorgia Campana, and the Belgian team won the bronze medal behind Italy and Russia. She also placed fifth in the uneven bars and the floor exercise event finals. Her final competition on the season was the Top Gym Tournament in Charleroi where she finished fourteenth in the all-around. In the event finals, she won the silver medal on the uneven bars behind Angelina Melnikova and placed fifth on the floor exercise.

=== 2015 ===
At the Belgian Championships, Derwael won the gold medal in the all-around, on the uneven bars, balance beam, and floor exercise and the silver medal on the vault. She won the gold medal in the all-around and helped the Belgian team finish second behind Germany at the Flanders Team Challenge. She competed at the European Youth Summer Olympic Festival with Axelle Klinckaert and Julie Meyers, and they won the silver medal in the team competition behind Russia. Derwael finished fourth in the all-around final. In the event finals, she won the silver medal on the uneven bars behind Daria Skrypnik, finished fifth on the balance beam, and won the bronze medal on the floor exercise. Her final junior competition was the Elite Gym Massilia where she finished fifth in the all-around and the floor exercise and won the bronze medal on the balance beam behind Laura Jurca and Enus Mariani.

== Senior career ==
=== 2016: First Olympic Games ===
Derwael became age-eligible for senior international competition in 2016. She made her senior debut at the International Gymnix where she won the team gold medal and placed seventh in the all-around. In the event finals, she won the gold medal on the uneven bar and the silver medal on the balance beam. In March, she broke her hand while training on the balance beam and missed the Olympic Test Event. She returned at the European Championships, and the Belgian team finished ninth in the qualification round. The Belgian national team competed at the Dutch Championships, and Derwael placed sixth in the all-around. In the event finals, she won the silver medal on the uneven bars behind Laura Waem and finished fifth on the floor exercise.

She represented Belgium at the 2016 Summer Olympics in Rio de Janeiro alongside Senna Deriks, Rune Hermans, Gaëlle Mys, and Laura Waem, and they placed twelfth in the qualification round. Individually, Derwael finished twelfth on the uneven bars and was the third reserve for the event final. She qualified for the all-around final and placed nineteenth with a total score of 56.299, which at the time was the highest placement ever achieved by a Belgian gymnast in an Olympic all-around final. After the Olympics, she competed at the Joaquín Blume Memorial and won the gold medal in the all-around.

=== 2017: First World medal ===
Derwael competed as a guest of Dunkerque Gym at the France Top 12 Championships and helped the team finish fifth. She placed sixth in the all-around and tied with Alison Lepin for the gold medal on the uneven bars. At the City of Jesolo Trophy, she placed twelfth in the all-around. At the European Championships in Cluj-Napoca, she finished seventh in the all-around final. Later in the uneven bars final, she became the first Belgian female gymnast to win a gold medal at the European Championships. Afterwards at the Flanders International Team Challenge, she won the bronze medal with the Belgian team and on the balance beam.

Derwael won the gold medal on the uneven bars at the Paris Challenge Cup. At the World Championships, she placed third on the uneven bars behind defending World champion Fan Yilin of China and first-year senior Elena Eremina of Russia. This made her the first Belgian female gymnast to medal at the World Artistic Gymnastics Championships. She also placed eighth in the all-around final. After winning the bronze medal on the uneven bars, she stated, "I'm really happy with the medal. I always dreamed about having a world championships medal, and now that I'm here it's all so surreal." Additionally, Derwael and Georgia-Mae Fenton of Great Britain successfully competed a difficult original skill (Stalder to Tkatchev with 1/2 turn), which is now named the Derwael-Fenton in the Code of Points. At the end of the year, she received the Vlaamse Reus, an award given by sports journalists to best Flemish sportsperson of the year.

=== 2018: First World title ===
Derwael competed at the DTB Pokal Team Challenge in Stuttgart and won the gold medal with the Belgian team and in the all-around. One week later at the Doha World Cup, she won the gold medal on the uneven bars and the bronze medal on the balance beam behind French gymnasts Melanie de Jesus dos Santos and Marine Boyer. In March, she won the gold medal in the all-around at the Belgian Championships. She helped the Belgian team finish fourth at the Heerenveen Friendly.

At the European Championships, Derwael qualified in second place to the uneven bars final behind 2013 European runner-up Jonna Adlerteg of Sweden and qualified in first to the balance beam final. Additionally, the Belgium team qualified in third place to the team final but withdrew to prevent injuries to any team members. In the event finals, she successfully defended her European title on uneven bars by placing ahead of Adlerteg and Russian national bars champion Angelina Melnikova. She won the silver medal on the balance beam behind reigning Olympic Champion Sanne Wevers of the Netherlands. At the Varsenare Friendly, she won the gold medal with the Belgian team and in the all-around.

At the 2018 World Championships Derwael helped the Belgian team finish eleventh in the qualification round, and she qualified for the all-around, uneven bars, and balance beam finals. She finished fourth in the all-around final with a total score of 55.699. In the uneven bars event final, she scored 15.200, winning the title by half a point over American Simone Biles while recording both the highest difficulty and execution scores in the final. By doing so, she became the first Belgian to ever win a gold medal at the World Artistic Gymnastics Championships. She also placed fourth in the balance beam event final. After the World Championships, she competed at the Cottbus World Cup and won the gold medal on the uneven bars. She received the Vlaamse Reus award for the second year in a row, and she was also named Belgian Sportswoman of the year and received the Belgian National Sports Merit Award and the Flemish Sportsjewel award.

=== 2019: Second World title ===
In March, Derwael competed at the Doha World Cup where she won the gold medal on the uneven bars and the silver medal on the balance beam. In April, Derwael announced that she would forgo competing at the European Championships in order to focus on helping Belgium qualify a team to the 2020 Olympics at the World Championships.

In June, Derwael competed at the Flanders International Team Challenge where she won the gold medal with the Belgian team on the uneven bars and the silver medal in the all-around behind Naomi Visser. Her next competition was the European Games in Minsk. During qualifications, she only competed on the balance beam and uneven bars, and she qualified for both event finals in first and second, respectively. During the uneven bars final she fell on her eponymous skill and finished fourth. Shortly after, she competed in the balance beam final and won the gold medal. At the Worms Friendly, she won the gold medals on the uneven bars and the balance beam, and she helped the Belgian team finish second behind Germany.

In October, Derwael competed at the World Championships in Stuttgart. During qualifications, she helped Belgium finish in tenth place; while they didn't qualify for the team final, they did qualify as a team for the 2020 Olympic Games in Tokyo. Individually, Derwael qualified for the all-around, uneven bars, and floor exercise finals. During the all-around final, she finished in fifth place but received the highest uneven bars score of the day. During the uneven bars final, Derwael scored 15.233, earning the gold medal and defending her World title. Derwael became the fifth woman in World Championships history to successfully defend her uneven bars title after Maxi Gnauck (1981, 1983), Daniela Silivaș (1987, 1989), Svetlana Khorkina (1995, 1996, 1997, 1999, 2001), and Fan Yilin (2015, 2017). Afterward, she withdrew from the floor exercise final, citing her previous foot injuries and wishing to remain healthy in the lead up to the Olympics. She was named Belgian Sportswoman of the year for the second year in a row.

=== 2020–21: Olympic champion ===
In February 2020, it was announced that Derwael would compete at the 2020 Tokyo World Cup. However, the Tokyo World Cup was later canceled due to the COVID-19 pandemic in Japan. In December 2020, Derwael and her boyfriend Siemen Voet tested positive for COVID-19, but she was asymptomatic.

Derwael returned to competition in March 2021 at the Belgian internal test meet where she won the all-around gold medal and the gold medals on all four events. In June, she competed at the Osijek Challenge Cup and won the gold medal on the uneven bars and the balance beam. At this event, she debuted a new element on the uneven bars: a toe-on laid-out Tkatchev (a Nabieva) with a 1/2 twist, and the element was named after her. At the Flanders International Team Challenge, she finished fourth in the all-around, helped the Belgian team win the silver medal behind France, and won the gold medal on the uneven bars.

In July 2021, Derwael was selected to represent Belgium at the 2020 Summer Olympics in Tokyo alongside Maellyse Brassart, Jutta Verkest, and Lisa Vaelen. At the Olympic Games, Derwael helped Belgium qualify for their first team final; individually, she qualified for the all-around and uneven bars finals. Belgium finished eighth in the team final. Derwael placed sixth in the all-around final with a total score of 55.965, recording the highest finish ever achieved by a Belgian gymnast in an Olympic all-around final. In the uneven bars final, Derwael won the gold medal with a score of 15.200, Belgium's first Olympic medal in artistic gymnastics and Belgium's first gold medal at the 2020 Summer Olympics. She was named Belgian Sportswoman of the year for the third time.

=== 2022–23: World medal and injuries ===
After a 15-month absence due to knee injuries, Derwael returned to competition at the 2022 World Championships in Liverpool. While there, she helped the Belgian team finish 11th during qualifications, and individually, she qualified for the uneven bars final. During the event final, she earned the bronze medal behind reigning world champion Wei Xiaoyuan of China and American Shilese Jones.

Derwael missed the 2023 European Championships due to a shoulder injury. She then dislocated her shoulder in practice leading up to the 2023 World Championships in Antwerp and withdrew from the event. At the World Championships, Belgium failed to qualify a full team for the 2024 Olympic Games. This meant Derwael would have to pursue an individual quota.

=== 2024: Third Olympic Games ===
Derwael announced at the beginning of the year she would compete on the balance beam at the 2024 World Cup series to attempt to qualify for the 2024 Olympic Games. Six months after shoulder surgery, she returned to competition at the Cairo World Cup and won the gold medal on the balance beam. Then at the World Cup in Cottbus, she finished in fifth place, but she was the highest-placing gymnast of those eligible for Olympic qualification points. Then at the World Cup in Baku, she won the bronze medal and was once again the highest-placing Olympic-eligible athlete. These results guaranteed her qualification for the 2024 Olympic Games. At the Olympics, Derwael finished 4th in the uneven bars final.

=== 2025: Third and fourth European title ===
Eight months after the Olympic Games in Paris Derwael returned to competition at the 2025 DTB Pokal Stuttgart winning gold on balance beam and bronze on the uneven bars. At the 2025 European championships Derwael won gold on both the uneven bars and balance beam, her third European title on the former and her first on the latter.

On 15 July 2025 Derwael announced her retirement from the sport, citing that she no longer wished to subject her body to the great and prolonged pressure of training at the highest level.

== Personal life ==
Derwael is studying Event Management at the Artevelde University of Applied Sciences in Ghent. She speaks Dutch, French, and English. At the 2020 Olympics, a photo of Derwael and her teammate Maellyse Brassart sitting in a split with tennis player Novak Djokovic went viral.

After the 2020 Olympics, Derwael began competing on the third season of Belgium's Dancing with the Stars. After receiving the highest score in the final episode, she was voted the winner of the season.

On 12 July 2025 Derwael married Thibau Dierickx.

== Eponymous skills ==
Derwael has two eponymous release moves on the uneven bars that are listed in the Code of Points.

Apparatus	Name	Description	Difficulty (Note: Valid for the 2025–2028 Code of Points)	Added to Code of Points
Uneven bars	Derwael-Fenton	Stalder to straddle Tkatchev release over high bar with ½ twist	E (0.5)	2017 World Championships
Uneven bars	Derwael II	Toe-on laid-out Tkatchev with a ½ twist	F (0.6)	2021 Osijek Challenge Cup

== Competitive history ==
Competitive history of Nina Derwael at the junior level
Year	Event	Team	AA	VT	UB	BB	FX
2013	Elite Gym Massilia	7	8				
2014	International Gymnix		15		8		
2014	Belgian Championships		5				
2014	Beaumont en Véron Friendly	2nd place, silver medalist(s)					
2014	Junior European Championships	6					
2014	Elite Gym Massilia	3rd place, bronze medalist(s)	3rd place, bronze medalist(s)		5		5
2014	Top Gym	3rd place, bronze medalist(s)	14		2nd place, silver medalist(s)		5
2015	Belgian Championships		1st place, gold medalist(s)	2nd place, silver medalist(s)	1st place, gold medalist(s)	1st place, gold medalist(s)	1st place, gold medalist(s)
2015	Flanders Team Challenge	2nd place, silver medalist(s)	1st place, gold medalist(s)				
2015	European Youth Olympic Festival	2nd place, silver medalist(s)	4		2nd place, silver medalist(s)	5	3rd place, bronze medalist(s)
2015	Elite Gym Massilia	4	5			3rd place, bronze medalist(s)	5

Competitive history of Nina Derwael at the senior level
Year	Event	Team	AA	VT	UB	BB	FX
2016	International Gymnix	1st place, gold medalist(s)	7		1st place, gold medalist(s)	2nd place, silver medalist(s)	
2016	European Championships	9					
2016	Dutch Championships		6		2nd place, silver medalist(s)		5
2016	Olympic Games	12	19		R3		
2016	Joaquim Blume Memorial		1st place, gold medalist(s)	3rd place, bronze medalist(s)	1st place, gold medalist(s)	1st place, gold medalist(s)	1st place, gold medalist(s)
2017	Top 12 Championships	5	6		1st place, gold medalist(s)		
2017	City of Jesolo Trophy	7	12				
2017	European Championships		7		1st place, gold medalist(s)		
2017	Flanders Team Challenge	3rd place, bronze medalist(s)				3rd place, bronze medalist(s)	
2017	Paris World Challenge Cup				1st place, gold medalist(s)	6	
2017	World Championships		8		3rd place, bronze medalist(s)		
2018	DTB Pokal Team Challenge	1st place, gold medalist(s)	1st place, gold medalist(s)				
2018	Doha World Cup				1st place, gold medalist(s)	3rd place, bronze medalist(s)	
2018	Belgian Championships		1st place, gold medalist(s)	3rd place, bronze medalist(s)	1st place, gold medalist(s)	2nd place, silver medalist(s)	2nd place, silver medalist(s)
2018	Heerenveen Friendly	4					
2018	European Championships				1st place, gold medalist(s)	2nd place, silver medalist(s)	
2018	Varsenare Friendly	1st place, gold medalist(s)	1st place, gold medalist(s)				
2018	World Championships		4		1st place, gold medalist(s)	4	
2018	Cottbus World Cup				1st place, gold medalist(s)		
2019	Doha World Cup				1st place, gold medalist(s)	2nd place, silver medalist(s)	
2019	Flanders Team Challenge	3rd place, bronze medalist(s)	2nd place, silver medalist(s)				
2019	European Games				4	1st place, gold medalist(s)	
2019	Worms Friendly	2nd place, silver medalist(s)			1st place, gold medalist(s)	1st place, gold medalist(s)	
2019	World Championships	R2	5		1st place, gold medalist(s)		WD
2021	Belgian Test Meet	1st place, gold medalist(s)	1st place, gold medalist(s)	1st place, gold medalist(s)	1st place, gold medalist(s)	1st place, gold medalist(s)	1st place, gold medalist(s)
2021	Osijek World Challenge Cup				1st place, gold medalist(s)	1st place, gold medalist(s)	
2021	Flanders Team Challenge	2nd place, silver medalist(s)	4		1st place, gold medalist(s)		
2021	Olympic Games	8	6		1st place, gold medalist(s)		R2
2022
2022	World Championships	11			3rd place, bronze medalist(s)		
2024	Cairo World Cup					1st place, gold medalist(s)	
2024	Cottbus World Cup					5	
2024	Baku World Cup					3rd place, bronze medalist(s)	
2024	Olympic Games				4		
2025	DTB Pokal Team Challenge	4			3rd place, bronze medalist(s)	1st place, gold medalist(s)	
2025	European Championships	10			1st place, gold medalist(s)	1st place, gold medalist(s)	

== Honors and awards ==
- Belgian Sports Woman of the Year (2018, 2019, 2021)
- Belgian National Sports Merit Award (2018)
- Vlaamse Reus (2017–2018)
- Flemish Sportsjewel (2018)
- Honorary Badge of the Flemish Community (2025)
- Grand Officer in the Order of Leopold (2025)
