= Rune Hermans =

Belgian artistic gymnast (born 1999)

- Born: 9 May 1999 (age 27) Leuven, Belgium
- Height: 160 cm (5 ft 3 in)

Gymnastics career
- Discipline: Women's artistic gymnastics
- Country represented: Belgium
- Club: Gym Haacht
- Retired: 2019

Rune Hermans (born 9 May 1999) is a Belgian former artistic gymnast. She competed in the all-around finals at the 2015 and 2017 World Championships. She represented Belgium at the 2016 Summer Olympics.

== Gymnastics career ==
=== Junior ===
Hermans competed at the 2013 European Youth Olympic Festival and finished ninth with the Belgian team. Individually, she finished 20th in the all-around final. Then at the 2014 International Gymnix, she finished fourth with Belgium in the team competition and placed sixth in the individual all-around. In the event finals, she finished fourth on the uneven bars, eighth on the balance beam, and fifth on the floor exercise. She was selected to compete at the Junior European Championships alongside Nina Derwael, Axelle Klinckaert, Jelle Beullens, and Cindy Vandenhole, and they finished sixth in the team competition. Individually, she qualified for the all-around final and finished ninth.

=== Senior ===
Hermans became age-eligible for senior competitions in 2015. At the 2015 FIT Challenge, she finished sixth in the all-around. She competed at the 2015 World Championships and helped Belgium finish 11th in the team competition and qualify for the 2016 Olympic Test Event. Individually, she qualified for the all-around final and finished 19th.

At the Olympic Test Event, Hermans helped Belgium finish third and qualify as a full team for the Olympic Games for the first time since 1948. She was initially the alternate for the Olympic team. However, she was added to the team after Axelle Klinckaert injured her knee. The team placed 12th in the qualification round.

Hermans won the all-around title at the 2017 Belgian Championships. She won another all-around gold medal at the 2017 FIT Challenge. At the 2017 World Championships, she advanced into the all-around final and finished 11th.

Hermans did not compete at the 2018 European Championships to focus on school. She was then selected to compete at the World Championships alongside Nina Derwael, Axelle Klinckaert, Maellyse Brassart, and Senna Deriks, and they finished 11th during the qualification round.

Hermans announced her retirement from the sport in March 2019.
