= Maegan Chant =

Canadian artistic gymnast

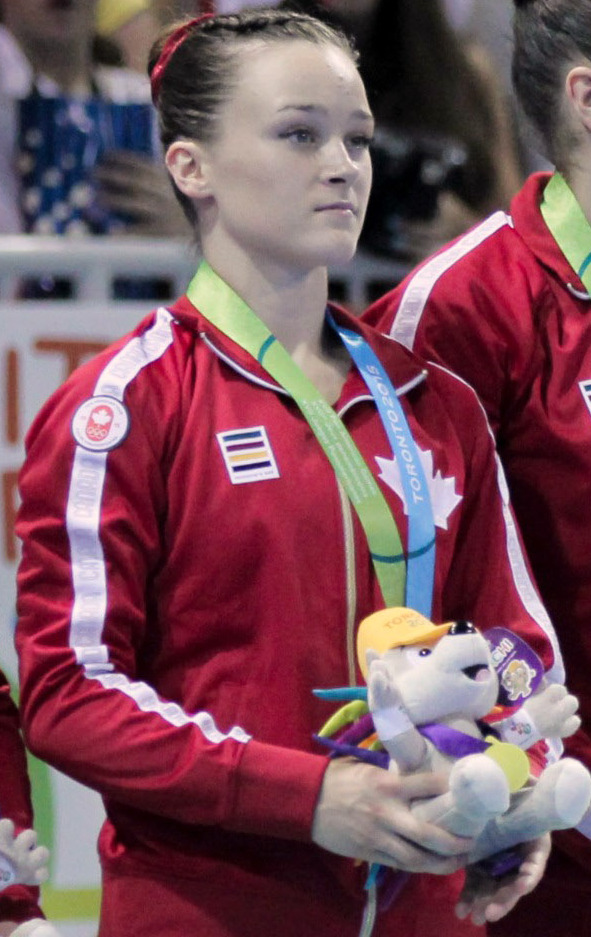
- Chant at the 2015 Pan American Games

Personal information
- Born: 19 April 1997 (age 29) Halifax, Nova Scotia, Canada
- Height: 157 cm (5 ft 2 in)

Gymnastics career
- Discipline: Women's artistic gymnastics
- Country represented: Canada
- College team: Florida Gators
- Head coach: Jenny Rowland
- Former coaches: Cristina Bontas-Tantaru, Gabriel Tantaru
- Retired: March 11, 2020
Medal record
Women's artistic gymnastics
Representing Canada
Pan American Games
Silver medal – second place	2015 Toronto	Team
Pacific Rim Championships
Silver medal – second place	2014 Richmond	Team
Bronze medal – third place	2014 Richmond	Vault

Maegan Chant Jackson (born 19 April 1997) is a Canadian former artistic gymnast. She was part of the Canadian team at the 2013 and 2014 World Championships as well as the 2015 Pan American Games. She competed for the Florida Gators women's gymnastics team.

== Career ==
In 2013, her first year as a senior, Chant competed at the Canadian Gymnastics Championships where she took bronze in the all-around and gold on vault, earning her a spot on the Canadian team at the 2013 World Artistic Gymnastics Championships. She also won a silver on vault at the Vendespace World cup as well as a gold in floor exercise and a bronze on vault at the Cottbus Challenge Cup.

In 2014, Chant took silver on both vault and floor exercise at the Canadian Gymnastics Championships. She was a part of the Canadian team at the 2014 Pacific Rim Gymnastics Championships where the team won silver. She also took bronze in the vault competition. That year Chant was also a part of the Canadian 2014 World Artistic Gymnastics Championships team.

In 2015, Chant won silver on floor exercise at the Canadian Gymnastics Championships. She was a part of the Canadian silver winning team at the 2015 Pan American Games.

In 2016, Chant was eighth at the Canadian Gymnastics Championships and was chosen for the 2016 Canadian Olympic National Selection camp. She placed eighth on day 1 and ninth on day 2 and was not selected for the team.

On June 23, 2023 Chant married Ryan Jackson.
