= Isabela Onyshko =

Canadian artistic gymnast (born 1998)

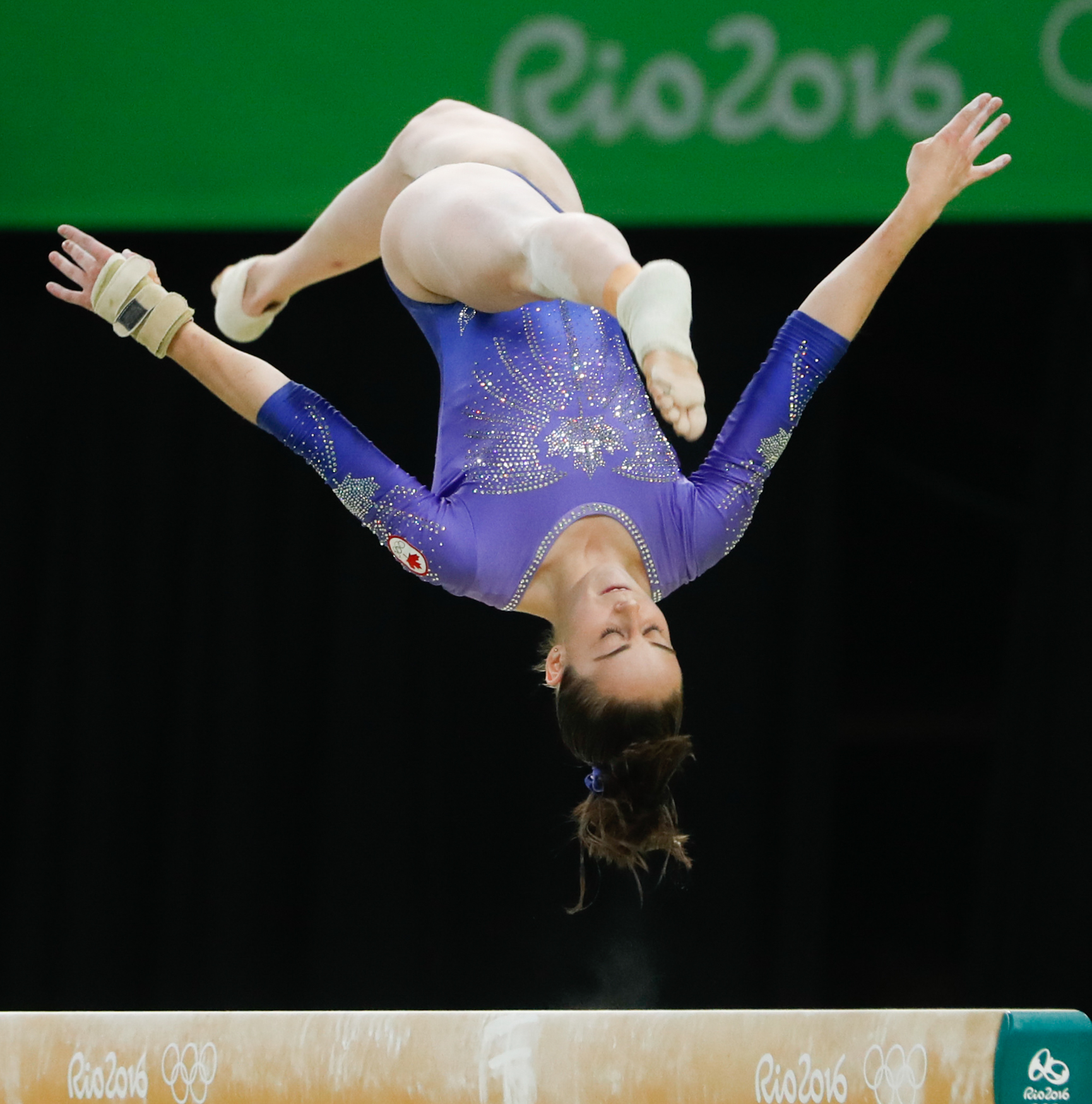
- Onyshko at the 2016 Summer Olympics

Personal information
- Full name: Isabela Maria Onyshko
- Nickname: Bela
- Born: June 23, 1998 (age 28) Minnedosa, Manitoba
- Height: 1.57 m (5 ft 2 in)

Gymnastics career
- Discipline: Women's artistic gymnastics
- Country represented: Canada
- Club: Vancouver Phoenix Gymnastics
- Head coach: Janice Fowler
- Music: "Frühling (Primavera Porteño)" by Jourist Quartet (2016)
Medal record
Representing Canada
Commonwealth Games
Gold medal – first place	2018 Gold Coast	Team
Pan American Games
Silver medal – second place	2015 Toronto	Team
Silver medal – second place	2019 Lima	Team
FIG World Cup
Event	1st	2nd	3rd
All-Around World Cup	0	1	0
Apparatus World Cup	0	0	1
World Challenge Cup	2	2	0
Total	2	3	1

Isabela Maria Onyshko (born 23 June 1998 in Minnedosa) is a Canadian artistic gymnast who represented her country at the 2016 Summer Olympics, the 2014 Commonwealth Games, as well as the 2014, 2015 and 2017 World Championships. She was the 2014 National Champion on beam. In 2016, she won Elite Canada and the National Championships in the individual All Around.

== Senior career ==
=== 2014 ===
At the 2014 Commonwealth Games, Onyshko finished fourth with her team and seventh in the all-around. Also in 2014, she competed at the 2014 World Artistic Gymnastics Championships in Nanning, China. Her team placed 12th in qualifications, failing to qualify to the team final, but they did qualify a full team for the 2015 World Championships.

=== 2015 ===
In January 2015, Onyshko competed at the Elite Canada competition, placing second overall, with third places finishes on the beam and the floor. At the Artistic Gymnastics World Cup event in Ljubljana Onyshko won three medals winning her first world cup gold in the uneven bars and another win on the balance beam while placing second in the floor event. In September, Gymnastics Canada named Onyshko to their World Championships team. She will represent Canada at the 2015 World Artistic Gymnastics Championships alongside 6 of her teammates from October 23 to November 1, 2015.

=== 2016 ===
On February 5, 2016, Onyshko won the 2016 Elite Canada competition. Later that month, she won all-around silver at the Stuttgart World Cup. She went on to compete at the Olympic Test Event in Rio de Janeiro, placing fourth on balance beam and floor exercise; and tenth in the all-around.

In June, she competed at the Canadian National Championships, besting reigning champion Ellie Black to win the all-around. She additionally won gold on uneven bars and balance beam, bronze on floor exercise, and placed fourth on vault. She then represented Canada at the 2016 Summer Olympics, where the team finished ninth. Individually, Onyshko finished 18th all around and 8th on beam. She became the first Canadian gymnast to make a beam final at the Olympics.

== Competitive History ==
Year	Event	Team	AA	VT	UB	BB	FX
2013	Elite Canada		5		2nd place, silver medalist(s)	8	8
2013	National Championships		4		3rd place, bronze medalist(s)	4	5
2013	Élite Gym Massilia	5	20				
2014	Elite Canada		6				5
2014	International Gymnix		4		1st place, gold medalist(s)		8
2014	Doha World Cup						3rd place, bronze medalist(s)
2014	Osijek World Cup				6	5	2nd place, silver medalist(s)
2014	National Championships		2nd place, silver medalist(s)		2nd place, silver medalist(s)	1st place, gold medalist(s)	4
2014	Commonwealth Games	4	7			7	
2014	World Championships	12		29	26	60	56
2015	Elite Canada		2nd place, silver medalist(s)			3rd place, bronze medalist(s)	3rd place, bronze medalist(s)
2015	WOGA Classic		5		7	8	5
2015	International Gymnix		2nd place, silver medalist(s)		2nd place, silver medalist(s)	1st place, gold medalist(s)	
2015	City of Jesolo Trophy	3rd place, bronze medalist(s)	11		8	4	5
2015	Ljubljana World Cup				1st place, gold medalist(s)	1st place, gold medalist(s)	2nd place, silver medalist(s)
2016	Elite Canada		1st place, gold medalist(s)		1st place, gold medalist(s)	1st place, gold medalist(s)	1st place, gold medalist(s)
2016	Summer Olympics	9	18			8	
2017
2017	World Championships		107		49	22	
2018
2018	Commonwealth Games	1st place, gold medalist(s)	8		5	4	
2019
2019	Pan American Games	2nd place, silver medalist(s)					
2020	Elite Canada		3rd place, bronze medalist(s)		3rd place, bronze medalist(s)	6	3rd place, bronze medalist(s)
