= International Gymnix =

Gymnastics competition in Montreal, Canada

The International Gymnix is a major international annual gymnastics competition. It is held in Montreal, Canada, with a senior and a junior tournaments. It was organized for the first time in 1991. It is the largest international gymnastics competition of Canada. The tournament brings together some of the best gymnasts in the world, including the Canadian elite.

Many talents were launched in this competition, to which have taken part MyKayla Skinner, Ellie Black, Carly Patterson, Nina Derwael, Jordyn Wieber, Dominique Dawes, Aliya Mustafina, Oksana Chusovitina, Isabela Onyshko, Shawn Johnson, Bridget Sloan, Larisa Iordache, Lilia Podkopayeva, Lauren Mitchell, Angelina Melnikova, Sunisa Lee, among others.

== Past editions ==
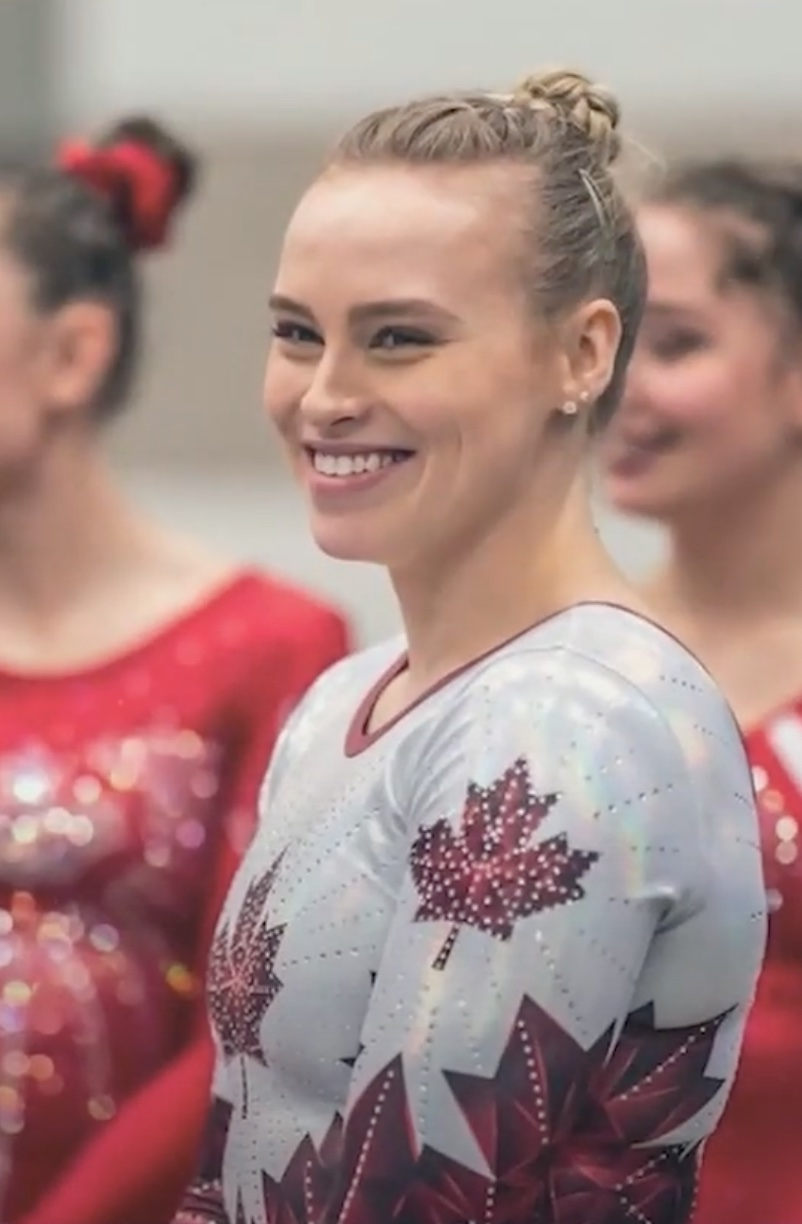
Ellie Black won two golds and two bronzes in the 24th edition

Edition	Date	City	Country
I	1992	Montreal	Canada
II	1993	Montreal	Canada
III	1994	Montreal	Canada
IV	1995	Montreal	Canada
V	1996	Montreal	Canada
VI	1997	Montreal	Canada
VII	1998	Montreal	Canada
VIII	1999	Montreal	Canada
IX	2000	Montreal	Canada
X	2001	Montreal	Canada
XI	2002	Montreal	Canada
XII	2003	Montreal	Canada
XIII	2004	Montreal	Canada
XIV	2005	Montreal	Canada
XV	2006	Montreal	Canada
XVI	2007	Montreal	Canada
XVII	2008	Montreal	Canada
XVIII	2009	Montreal	Canada
XIX	2010	Montreal	Canada
XX	2011	Montreal	Canada
XXI	2012	Montreal	Canada
XXII	2013	Montreal	Canada
XXIII	6–9 March 2014	Montreal	Canada
XXIV	2015	Montreal	Canada
XXV	2016	Montreal	Canada
XXVI	2017	Montreal	Canada
XXVII	2018	Montreal	Canada
XXVIII	8–10 March 2019	Montreal	Canada
XXIX	6–8 March 2020	Montreal	Canada
