= 2016 in artistic gymnastics =

Below is a list of notable women's artistic gymnastics events scheduled to be held in 2016, as well as the medalists.

== Retirements ==
Gymnasts who announced retirements in 2016
Gymnast	Country	Date	Ref
Kyla Ross	United States	22 February 2016	
McKayla Maroney	United States	24 February 2016	
Ksenia Afanasyeva	Russia	21 July 2016	
Fabian Hambüchen	Germany	16 August 2016	
Lauren Mitchell	Australia	27 September 2016	

== Calendar of events ==
Date	Location	Event	Winner(s)
February 4–7	(Canada) Halifax	Elite Canada	Senior AA:Isabela Onyshko; Senior VT: Shallon Olsen; Senior UB: Isabela Onyshko; Senior BB: Isabela Onyshko; Senior FX: Isabela Onyshko; Junior AA: Jade Chrobok; Junior VT: Jade Chrobok; Junior UB: Victoria Jurca; Junior BB: Jade Chrobok; Junior FX: Jade Chrobok
February 5–7	(United States) Houston	Houston National Invitational	TF: (United States) Twistars USA; AA: (Brazil) Lorrane Oliveira
February 12–14	(United States) Oklahoma City	Nadia Comăneci International Invitational	Results not publicly available
February 13	(Italy) Rimini	1st Italian Serie A Nationale	TF: Brixia Brescia; AA: Giorgia Villa
February 13	(Latvia) Riga	Igor Vihrov Cup	AA: (Russia) Evgenia Shelgunova; VT: (Russia) Evgenia Shelgunova; UB: (Russia) Evgenia Shelgunova; BB: (Russia) Evgenia Shelgunova; FX: (Russia) Evgenia Shelgunova
February 13	(United States) Frisco	WOGA Classic	Senior AA: (Japan) Nagi Kajita; Senior VT: (Canada) Shallon Olsen; Senior UB: (United States) Madison Kocian; Senior BB: (United States) Madison Kocian; Senior FX: (Canada) Shallon Olsen; Junior AA: (United States) Irina Alexeeva; Junior VT: (United States) Sloane Blakely; Junior UB: (United States) Irina Alexeeva; Junior BB: (United States) Irina Alexeeva; Junior FX: (United States) Irina Alexeeva
February 19–21	(Azerbaijan) Baku	Baku World Cup	VT: (Uzbekistan) Oksana Chusovitina; UB: (Germany) Lina Philipp; BB: (Brazil) Flávia Saraiva; FX: (Brazil) Flávia Saraiva
February 25–27	(Belarus) Minsk	Antonia Koshel Cup	Senior AA: (Russia) Evgenia Shelgunova; Senior VT: (Russia) Evgenia Shelgunova; Senior UB: (Russia) Evgenia Shelgunova; Senior BB: (Russia) Evgenia Shelgunova; Senior FX: (Russia) Evgenia Shelgunova; Junior AA: (Ukraine) Diana Varinska; Junior VT: (Ukraine) Diana Varinska; Junior UB: (Ukraine) Diana Varinska; Junior BB: (Ukraine) Diana Varinska; Junior FX: (Ukraine) Diana Varinska
February 27–28	(Scotland) Perth	Scottish Championships	Senior AA: Cara Kennedy; Senior VT: Amy Regan; Senior UB: Cara Kennedy and Isabella Tolometti; Senior BB: Cara Kennedy; Senior FX: Shannon Archer; Junior AA: Ellie Russell; Junior VT: Ellie Russell; Junior UB: Ellie Russell; Junior BB: Erin Gallacher; Junior FX: Sarah McKenzie
February 27–28	(Netherlands) Heerenveen	Sidijk Tournament	Senior AA: (Sweden) Emma Larsson; Senior VT: (Netherlands) Lisa Top; Senior UB: (Netherlands) Lisa Top; Senior BB: (Sweden) Emma Larsson; Senior FX: (Netherlands) Chiara Frisina Fauste; Junior AA: (Netherlands) Sanna Veerman; Junior VT: (Netherlands) Naomi Visser; Junior UB: (Netherlands) Sanna Veerman; Junior BB: (Netherlands) Sanna Veerman; Junior FX: (Netherlands) Vienne Supriana
February 27–28	(Wales) Cardiff	Welsh Championships	Senior AA: Rebecca Moore; Senior VT: Rebecca Moore; Senior UB: Rebecca Moore; Senior BB: Rebecca Moore; Senior FX: Rebecca Moore; Junior AA: Maisie Methuen; Junior VT: Maisie Methuen; Junior UB: Maisie Methuen; Junior BB: Maisie Methuen; Junior FX: Maisie Methuen; Open Senior AA: (Wales) Rebecca Moore; Open Senior VT: (Wales) Rebecca Moore; Open Senior UB: (England) Gabby Jupp; Open Senior BB: (England) Gabby Jupp; Open Senior FX: (Wales) Rebecca Moore; Open Junior AA: (Wales) Maisie Methuen; Open Junior VT: (Wales) Maisie Methuen; Open Junior UB: (Wales) Maisie Methuen; Open Junior BB: (Wales) Maisie Methuen; Open Junior FX: (Wales) Maisie Methuen
March 4	(United States) Newark	Nastia Liukin Cup	Senior: Rachael Lukacs; Junior: Andrea Li
March 4–5	(Austria) Linz	Austrian Team Open	TF: Switzerland; AA: (Hungary) Zsófia Kovács
March 4–6	(Canada) Montreal	L'International Gymnix	Senior TF: Belgium 1 Senior AA: (Canada) Isabela Onyshko; Senior VT: (Canada) Shallon Olsen; Senior UB: Nina Derwael; Senior BB: (Canada) Meixi Semple; Senior FX: Axelle Klinckaert; Junior TF: United States; Junior AA: Gabby Perea; Junior VT: Jordan Chiles; Junior UB: (Russia) Anastasia Ilyankova; Junior BB: Emma Malabuyo; Junior FX: Emma Malabuyo
March 5	(Italy) Ancona	2nd Italian Serie A Nationale	TF: Brixia Brescia; AA: Elisa Meneghini
March 5	(United States) Newark	AT&T American Cup	(United States) Gabby Douglas
March 10–13	(United Kingdom) Glasgow	British Team Championships	TF: The Academy; AA: Amy Tinkler
March 12	(United Kingdom) Glasgow	Glasgow World Cup	(United States) MyKayla Skinner
March 18–20	(Italy) Jesolo	City of Jesolo Trophy	Senior TF: United States; Senior AA: Gabby Douglas; Senior VT: MyKayla Skinner; Senior UB: Ashton Locklear; Senior BB: Laurie Hernandez; Senior FX: Aly Raisman; Junior AA: Jordan Chiles; Junior VT: Jordan Chiles; Junior UB: Gabby Perea; Junior BB: Emma Malabuyo; Junior FX: Trinity Thomas
March 18–20	(Germany) Stuttgart	DTB Pokal Team Challenge Cup	Russia
March 18–20	(England) Loughborough	English Championships	Senior AA: Claudia Fragapane; Senior VT: Katie Meadow; Senior UB: Claudia Fragapane; Senior BB: Claudia Fragapane; Senior FX: Claudia Fragapane; Junior AA: Alice Kinsella; Junior VT: Taeja James; Junior UB: Taeja James; Junior BB: Alice Kinsella; Junior FX: Alice Kinsella
March 19	(Germany) Stuttgart	Stuttgart World Cup	(Germany) Sophie Scheder
March 23–26	(Algeria) Alger	African Championships	Senior TF: Egypt; Senior AA: Sherine Elzeiny; Senior VT: (South Africa) Kirsten Beckett; Senior UB: Armia Zakaria Rahaf; Senior BB: Nada Mohamed; Senior FX: Mandy Mohamed; Junior TF: Egypt; Junior AA: Hussein Ahmed Farah
March 24–26	(Qatar) Doha	Doha World Challenge Cup	VT: (Switzerland) Giulia Steingruber; UB: (Sweden) Jonna Adlerteg; BB: (Romania) Cătălina Ponor; FX: (Switzerland) Giulia Steingruber
March 31-April 3	(Germany) Cottbus	Cottbus World Challenge Cup	VT: (Uzbekistan) Oksana Chusovitina; UB: (Germany) Sophie Scheder; BB: (Poland) Katarzyna Jurkowska-Kowalska; FX: (Netherlands) Lisa Top
April 1–3	(Japan) Tokyo	All-Japan Championships	Mai Murakami
April 2	(Italy) Rome	3rd Italian Serie A Nationale	TF: Brixia Brescia; AA: Giorgia Campana
April 3	(Belgium) Mouscron	Belgium Friendly	Senior TF: Belgium; Senior AA: Axelle Klinckaert; Junior TF: Romania; Junior AA: Carmen Ghiciuc
April 5–9	(Russia) Penza	Russian Championships	Senior TF: Central 1 Senior AA: Angelina Melnikova; Senior VT: Seda Tutkhalyan; Senior UB: Daria Skrypnik and Daria Spiridonova; Senior BB: Angelina Melnikova; Senior FX: Ksenia Afanasyeva and Angelina Melnikova; Junior TF: Central 1 Junior (MS) AA: Anastasia Ilyankova; Junior (MS) VT: Yuliana Perebinosova; Junior (MS) UB: Anastasia Ilyankova; Junior (MS) BB: Elena Eremina; Junior (MS) FX: Anastasia Ilyankova; Junior (CMS) AA: Ksenia Klimenko; Junior (CMS) VT: Aleksandra Shekoldina; Junior (CMS) UB: Ksenia Klimenko; Junior (CMS) BB: Ksenia Klimenko; Junior (CMS) FX: Varvara Zubova
April 8–10	(United Kingdom) Liverpool	British Championships	Senior AA: Claudia Fragapane; Senior VT: Ellie Downie; Senior UB: Gabby Jupp; Senior BB: Becky Downie; Senior FX: Amy Tinkler; Junior AA: Maisie Methuen; Junior VT: Sophie Scott; Junior UB: Megan Parker; Junior BB: Alice Kinsella; Junior FX: Zoe Simmons
April 8–10	(Slovenia) Ljubljana	Ljubljana World Challenge Cup	VT: (Puerto Rico) Paula Mejías; UB: (Slovenia) Ivana Kamnikar; BB: (Malaysia) Tan Ing Yueh; FX: (Malaysia) Tracie Ang
April 8–10	(United States) Everett	Pacific Rim Gymnastics Championships	TF: United States; Senior AA: Simone Biles; Senior VT: (Canada) Shallon Olsen; Senior UB: Ashton Locklear; Senior BB: Ragan Smith; Senior FX: Aly Raisman; Junior AA: (Japan) Kiko Kuwajima; Junior VT: (Japan) Kiko Kuwajima; Junior UB: (Japan) Natsumi Hanashima; Junior BB: (Japan) Kiko Kuwajima; Junior FX: (Japan) Kiko Kuwajima
April 16–17	(Ukraine) Kyiv	Stella Zakharova Cup	TF: Ukraine; Senior AA: Yana Horokhova; Junior AA: (Belarus) Hanna Traukova; VT: Yana Fedorova; UB: (Egypt) Farah Ahmed Mahmoud and Yana Fedorova; BB: Yana Fedorova; FX: Anastasia Budiashkina
April 16–19	(Brazil) Rio de Janeiro	Olympic Test Event	TF: Brazil; AA: (Switzerland) Giulia Steingruber; VT: (India) Dipa Karmakar; UB: (Germany) Elisabeth Seitz; BB: (Netherlands) Sanne Wevers; FX: Flávia Saraiva
April 28-May 1	(Croatia) Osijek	Osijek World Challenge Cup	VT: (United Kingdom) Ellie Downie; UB: (United Kingdom) Ellie Downie; BB: (United Kingdom) Ellie Downie; FX: (United Kingdom) Ellie Downie
May 4–5	(Japan) Tokyo	NHK Cup	Asuka Teramoto
May 5–8	(Netherlands) Hertogenbosch	IAG SportEvent	AA: Eythora Thorsdottir
May 6–8	(Hungary) Budapest	Hungarian National Championships	Senior AA: Luca Divéky; Senior VT: Boglárka Dévai; Senior UB: Zsófia Kovács; Junior AA: Noémi Jakab
May 7	(Italy) Turin	4th Italian Serie A Nationale	TF: Brixia Brescia; AA: Federica Macrì
May 7–8	(Belgium) Ghent	Belgian National Championships	
May 7–8	(Iceland) Reykjavík	Nordic Championships	Senior TF: Iceland; Senior AA: Ece Ayan; Junior TF: Sweden; Junior AA: (Denmark) Marie Skammelsen
May 7–15	(China) Hefei	Chinese National Championships	TF: Hunan; AA: Shang Chunsong; VT: Yuan Xiaoyang; UB: Fan Yilin; BB: Shang Chunsong; FX: Shang Chunsong
May 13–15	(Bulgaria) Varna	Varna World Challenge Cup	VT: (Switzerland) Giulia Steingruber; UB: (Russia) Daria Skrypnik; BB: (France) Marine Boyer; FX: (Switzerland) Giulia Steingruber
May 20–22	(Brazil) São Paulo	São Paulo World Challenge Cup	VT: (Brazil) Daniele Hypólito; UB: (Venezuela) Jessica López; BB: (Brazil) Daniele Hypólito; FX: (Brazil) Daniele Hypólito
May 23-June 6	(Australia) Melbourne	Australian National Championships	Senior AA: Rianna Mizzen; Senior VT: Emily Little; Senior UB: Rianna Mizzen; Senior BB: Lauren Mitchell; Senior FX: Larrissa Miller; Junior AA: Jade Vella-Wright; Junior VT: Talia Folino; Junior UB: Talia Folino; Junior BB: Jade Vella-Wright; Junior FX: Jade Vella-Wright
May 31-June 5	(Canada) Edmonton	Canadian National Championships	Senior AA: Isabela Onyshko; Junior AA: Ana Padurariu
June 1–5	(Switzerland) Bern	European Championships	Senior TF: Russia; Senior VT: (Switzerland) Giulia Steingruber; Senior UB: (United Kingdom) Becky Downie; Senior BB: Aliya Mustafina; Senior FX: (Switzerland) Giulia Steingruber; Junior TF: Russia; Junior AA: Elena Eremina; Junior VT: (Italy) Martina Maggio; Junior UB: Anastasia Ilyankova; Junior BB: Anastasia Ilyankova; Junior FX: (Romania) Denisa Golgotă
June 4	(United States) Hartford	Secret U.S. Classic	Senior AA: Aly Raisman; Senior VT: Aly Raisman; Senior UB: Ashton Locklear; Senior BB: Simone Biles; Senior FX: Aly Raisman; Junior AA: Irina Alexeeva; Junior VT: Jordan Chiles; Junior UB: Gabby Perea; Junior BB: Irina Alexeeva; Junior FX: Morgan Hurd
June 4–5	(Japan) Tokyo	All-Japan Event Championships	VT: Sae Miyakawa; UB: Asuka Teramoto; BB: Asuka Teramoto; FX: Mai Murakami
June 13–19	(China) Luoyang	Chinese Junior National Championships	
June 18–19	(France) Mulhouse	French National Championships	Senior AA: Marine Boyer; Junior AA: Lorette Charpy; VT: Coline Devillard; UB: Loan His; BB: Marine Boyer; FX: Juliette Bossu
June 23–26	(Portugal) Anadia	Anadia World Challenge Cup	VT: (Cuba) Marcia Videaux; UB: (Australia) Rianna Mizzen; BB: (Brazil) Flávia Saraiva; FX: (Brazil) Flávia Saraiva
June 24–26	(United States) St. Louis	2016 U.S. National Gymnastics Championships	Senior AA: Simone Biles; Senior VT: Simone Biles; Senior UB: Ashton Locklear; Senior BB: Simone Biles; Senior FX: Simone Biles; Junior AA: Maile O'Keefe; Junior VT: Chae Campbell; Junior UB: Gabby Perea; Junior BB: Maile O'Keefe; Junior FX: Maile O'Keefe
June 25–26	(Netherlands) Rotterdam	Dutch National Championships	Senior AA: Eythora Thorsdottir; Senior VT: Vera van Pol; Senior UB: Laura Waem; Senior BB: Sanne Wevers; Senior FX: Axelle Klinckaert; Junior AA: Sanna Veerman; Junior VT: Sanna Veerman; Junior UB: Sanna Veerman; Junior BB: Maud Lammertink; Junior FX: Naomi Visser; Espoir AA: Astrid de Zeeuw; Espoir VT: Juliette Pijnacker; Espoir UB: Astrid de Zeeuw; Espoir BB: Astrid de Zeeuw; Espoir FX: Laura de Witt
June 25–26	(Germany) Hamburg	German National Championships	AA: Sophie Scheder
June 25–26	(Switzerland) St. Gallen	Swiss National Championships	AA: Giulia Steingruber
June 25–29	(Canada) Gatineau	Canadian Olympic Trials	Day 1 AA: Ellie Black; Day 2 AA: Brittany Rogers
June 28-July 2	(Russia) Penza	Russian Cup	TF: Central; AA: Angelina Melnikova; VT: Maria Paseka; UB: Natalia Kapitonova; BB: Angelina Melnikova; FX: Lilia Akhaimova
July 1–3	(Turkey) Mersin	Mersin World Challenge Cup	VT: (Uzbekistan) Oksana Chusovitina; UB: (Colombia) Catalina Escobar; BB: (Turkey) Tutya Yılmaz; FX: (Turkey) Göksu Üçtaş
July 1–3	(Romania) Cluj-Napoca	Romanian National Championships	AA: Larisa Iordache; VT: Denisa Golgotă; UB: Larisa Iordache; BB: Cătălina Ponor; FX: Cătălina Ponor
July 8–10	(United States) San Jose	U.S. Olympic Trials	AA: Simone Biles; VT: Simone Biles; UB: Madison Kocian; BB: Laurie Hernandez; FX: Simone Biles
July 9	(Netherlands) Heerenveen	Dutch Olympic Trials	AA: Eythora Thorsdottir
July 9	(Germany) Frankfurt	German Olympic Trials	AA: Sophie Scheder
July 9–10	(Italy) Bari	Italian National Championships	AA: Vanessa Ferrari; VT: Asia D'Amato; UB: Martina Rizzelli; BB: Carlotta Ferlito and Elisa Meneghini; FX: Elisa Meneghini
July 10–18	(Turkey) Trabzon	Gymnasiade	TF: Brazil; AA: Fabiane Valentin; VT: Fabiane Valentin; UB: Luisa Kirchmayer; BB: Thais Fidelis; FX: Thais Fidelis
July 11–16	(Chinese Taipei) New Taipei	International Children's Games	
August 6–15	(Brazil) Rio de Janeiro	Olympic Games	TF: United States; AA: Simone Biles; VT: Simone Biles; UB: (Russia) Aliya Mustafina; BB: (Netherlands) Sanne Wevers; FX: Simone Biles
September 1–4	(United Kingdom) Loughborough	School Games	TF: Wales; AA: Latalia Bevan; VT: Maisie Methuen; UB: Maisie Methuen; BB: Maisie Methuen; FX: Maisie Methuen
September 12–18	(Bolivia) Sucre	Pan American Individual Event Championships	Senior VT: (Mexico) Nicolle Castro; Senior UB: (Mexico) Nicolle Castro; Senior BB: (Brazil) Milena Theodoro; Senior FX: (Brazil) Milena Theodoro; Junior TF: Canada; Junior AA: Ana Padurariu; Junior VT: (Brazil) Thais Fidelis; Junior UB: Ana Padurariu; Junior BB: Ana Padurariu; Junior FX: Ana Padurariu
October 7–10	(Hungary) Szombathely	Szombathely World Challenge Cup	VT: (China) Liu Jinru; UB: (China) Xie Yufen; BB: (Australia) Emily Little and (China) Lü Jiaqi; FX: (Hungary) Dorina Böczögő
October 10–17	(China) Huzhou	Chinese Individual National Championships	
October 21–23	(Norway) Trondheim	Northern European Championships	TF: Norway; AA: (Denmark) Marie Skammelsen; VT: (Denmark) Marie Skammelsen; UB: (Wales) Emily Thomas; BB: (Finland) Maija Leinonen; FX: (Denmark) Marie Skammelsen
October 31-November 6	(Peru) Lima	South American Championships	TF: Argentina; AA: (Colombia) Ginna Escobar; VT: (Peru) Ariana Orrego; UB: (Peru) Ariana Orrego; BB: (Colombia) Ginna Escobar; FX: (Colombia) Ginna Escobar
November 11–13	(France) Marseille	Elite Gym Massilia	
December 10–11	(Japan) Toyota	Toyota International	VT: (Russia) Seda Tutkhalyan; UB: (Russia) Angelina Melnikova; BB: (Japan) Mai Murakami; FX: (Japan) Mai Murakami

== International Medalists (WAG) ==
=== Major Competitions ===
==== International Championships ====
Olympic Games
Competition	Event	Gold	Silver	Bronze
Olympic Games	Team	United States	Russia	China
Olympic Games	All-Around	(United States) Simone Biles	(United States) Aly Raisman	(Russia) Aliya Mustafina
Olympic Games	Vault	(United States) Simone Biles	(Russia) Maria Paseka	(Switzerland) Giulia Steingruber
Olympic Games	Uneven Bars	(Russia) Aliya Mustafina	(United States) Madison Kocian	(Germany) Sophie Scheder
Olympic Games	Balance Beam	(Netherlands) Sanne Wevers	(United States) Laurie Hernandez	(United States) Simone Biles
Olympic Games	Floor Exercise	(United States) Simone Biles	(United States) Aly Raisman	(United Kingdom) Amy Tinkler

Test Event
Competition	Event	Gold	Silver	Bronze
Aquece Rio	Team	Brazil	Germany	Belgium
Aquece Rio	All-Around	(Switzerland) Giulia Steingruber	(Brazil) Flávia Saraiva	(Germany) Tabea Alt
Aquece Rio	Vault	(India) Dipa Karmakar	(Uzbekistan) Oksana Chusovitina	(Australia) Emily Little
Aquece Rio	Uneven Bars	(Germany) Elisabeth Seitz	(Germany) Sophie Scheder	(Brazil) Rebeca Andrade
Aquece Rio	Balance Beam	(Netherlands) Sanne Wevers	(Brazil) Flávia Saraiva	(Netherlands) Lieke Wevers
Aquece Rio	Floor Exercise	(Brazil) Flávia Saraiva	(Australia) Larrissa Miller	(Germany) Leah Griesser

==== Continental Championships ====
Continental Championships
Competition	Event	Gold	Silver	Bronze
African	Team	Senior: Egypt; Junior: Egypt	Senior: South Africa; Junior: South Africa	Senior: Algeria; Junior: Morocco
African	All-Around	Senior: (Egypt) Sherine Elzeiny; Junior: (Egypt) Hussein Ahmed Farah	Senior: (South Africa) Claudia Cummins; Junior: (South Africa) Caitlin Rooskrantz	Senior: (South Africa) Kirsten Beckett; Junior: (Egypt) Mahmoud Sayed Farah
African	Vault	Senior: (South Africa) Kirsten Beckett	Senior: (South Africa) Claudia Cummins	Senior: (Egypt) Mai El Sayed
African	Uneven Bars	Senior: (Egypt) Armia Zakaria Rahaf	Senior: (South Africa) Claudia Cummins	Senior: (South Africa) Kirsten Beckett
African	Balance Beam	Senior: (Egypt) Nada Mohamed	Senior: (South Africa) Lukisha Schalk	Senior: (South Africa) Claudia Cummins
African	Floor Exercise	Senior: (Egypt) Mandy Mohamed	Senior: (South Africa) Kirsten Beckett	Senior: (South Africa) Claudia Cummins
Pacific Rim	Team	United States	Canada	Australia
Pacific Rim	All-Around	Senior: (United States) Simone Biles; Junior: (Japan) Kiko Kuwajima	Senior: (United States) Aly Raisman; Junior: (Japan) Natsumi Hanashima	Senior: (Japan) Nagi Kajita; Junior: (Mexico) Louise Lopez
Pacific Rim	Vault	Senior: (Canada) Shallon Olsen; Junior: (Japan) Kiko Kuwajima	Senior: (Canada) Brittany Rogers; Junior: (Chinese Taipei) Ko Ching Fang	Senior: (New Zealand) Courtney McGregor; Junior: (New Zealand) Stella Ashcroft
Pacific Rim	Uneven Bars	Senior: (United States) Ashton Locklear; Junior: (Japan) Natsumi Hanashima	Senior: (Australia) Larrissa Miller; Junior: (Mexico) Jimeno Moreno	Senior: (Canada) Brittany Rogers; Junior: (Colombia) Paula Arevalo and (Japan) Kiko Kuwajima
Pacific Rim	Balance Beam	Senior: (United States) Ragan Smith; Junior: (Japan) Kiko Kuwajima	Senior: (United States) Aly Raisman; Junior: (Mexico) Jimeno Moreno	Senior: (Japan) Nagi Kajita; Junior: (Mexico) Louise Lopez
Pacific Rim	Floor Exercise	Senior: (United States) Aly Raisman; Junior: (Japan) Kiko Kuwajima	Senior: (United States) Brenna Dowell; Junior: (Mexico) Louise Lopez	Senior: (Canada) Shallon Olsen; Junior: (Japan) Mana Oguchi
Asian (Junior)	Team			
Asian (Junior)	All-Around			
Asian (Junior)	Vault			
Asian (Junior)	Uneven Bars			
Asian (Junior)	Balance Beam			
Asian (Junior)	Floor Exercise			
European	Team	Senior: Russia; Junior: Russia	Senior: Great Britain; Junior: Great Britain	Senior: France; Junior: Romania
European	All-Around	Junior: (Russia) Elena Eremina	Junior: (Switzerland) Lynn Genhart	Junior: (Italy) Martina Basile
European	Vault	Senior: (Switzerland) Giulia Steingruber; Junior: (Italy) Martina Maggio	Senior: (United Kingdom) Ellie Downie; Junior: (Italy) Martina Basile and (Romania) Denisa Golgotă	Senior: (Russia) Ksenia Afanasyeva; Junior: N/A
European	Uneven Bars	Senior: (United Kingdom) Becky Downie; Junior: (Russia) Anastasia Ilyankova	Senior: (Russia) Daria Spiridonova; Junior: (Russia) Yuliana Perebinosova	Senior: (Russia) Aliya Mustafina; Junior: (France) Lorette Charpy
European	Balance Beam	Senior: (Russia) Aliya Mustafina; Junior: (Russia) Anastasia Ilyankova	Senior: (France) Marine Boyer; Junior: (United Kingdom) Alice Kinsella	Senior: (Romania) Cătălina Ponor; Junior: (Russia) Elena Eremina
European	Floor Exercise	Senior: (Switzerland) Giulia Steingruber; Junior: (Romania) Denisa Golgotă	Senior: (United Kingdom) Ellie Downie; Junior: (United Kingdom) Alice Kinsella	Senior: (Romania) Cătălina Ponor; Junior: (Russia) Yuliana Perebinosova
Northern European	Team	Norway		
Northern European	All-Around			
Northern European	Vault			
Northern European	Uneven Bars			
Northern European	Balance Beam			
Northern European	Floor Exercise			
Pan American	Team	Junior: Canada	Junior: Argentina	Junior: Mexico
Pan American	All-Around	Junior: (Canada) Ana Padurariu	Junior: (Brazil) Thais Fidelis	Junior: (Canada) Sayge Urban
Pan American	Vault	Senior: (Mexico) Nicolle Castro; Junior: (Brazil) Thais Fidelis	Senior: (Brazil) Leticia Costa; Junior: (Canada) Sayge Urban	Senior: (Argentina) Esperanza Fernandez; Junior: (Argentina) Martina Dominici
Pan American	Uneven Bars	Senior: (Mexico) Nicolle Castro; Junior: (Canada) Ana Padurariu	Senior: (Colombia) Nathalia Sánchez; Junior: (Canada) Jade Chrobok	Senior: (Argentina) Ailen Valente; Junior: (Argentina) Agustina Pisos
Pan American	Balance Beam	Senior: (Brazil) Milena Theodoro; Junior: (Canada) Ana Padurariu	Senior: (Canada) Meaghan Ruttan; Junior: (Brazil) Thais Fidelis	Senior: (Mexico) Nicolle Castro; Junior: (Canada) Haley de Jong
Pan American	Floor Exercise	Senior: (Brazil) Milena Theodoro; Junior: (Canada) Ana Padurariu	Senior: (Puerto Rico) Nicole Diaz; Junior: (Argentina) Martina Dominici	Senior: (Argentina) Ailen Valente; Junior: (Mexico) Andrea Pirsch
South American	Team			
South American	All-Around			
South American	Vault			
South American	Uneven Bars			
South American	Balance Beam			
South American	Floor Exercise			

=== Challenge Cup and World Cup Series ===
==== Challenge Cup Series ====
FIG World Challenge Cup
Competition	Event	Gold	Silver	Bronze
(Azerbaijan) Baku	Vault	(Uzbekistan) Oksana Chusovitina	(Slovenia) Tjaša Kysselef	(Austria) Lisa Ecker
(Azerbaijan) Baku	Uneven Bars	(Germany) Lina Philipp	(Brazil) Daniele Hypólito	(Brazil) Flávia Saraiva
(Azerbaijan) Baku	Balance Beam	(Brazil) Flávia Saraiva	(Sweden) Emma Larsson	(Austria) Elisa Haemmerle
(Azerbaijan) Baku	Floor Exercise	(Brazil) Flávia Saraiva	(Sweden) Emma Larsson	(Azerbaijan) Marina Nekrasova
(Qatar) Doha	Vault	(Switzerland) Giulia Steingruber	(Slovenia) Teja Belak	(Slovenia) Tjaša Kysselef
(Qatar) Doha	Uneven Bars	(Sweden) Jonna Adlerteg	(Brazil) Rebeca Andrade	(Portugal) Ana Filipa Martins
(Qatar) Doha	Balance Beam	(Romania) Cătălina Ponor	(Brazil) Thauany Araujo	(Portugal) Ana Filipa Martins
(Qatar) Doha	Floor Exercise	(Switzerland) Giulia Steingruber	(Romania) Diana Bulimar	(Hungary) Zsófia Kovács
(Germany) Cottbus	Vault	(Uzbekistan) Oksana Chusovitina	(China) Wu Jing	(Slovenia) Tjaša Kysselef
(Germany) Cottbus	Uneven Bars	(Germany) Sophie Scheder	(China) Zhu Xiaofang	(Poland) Gabriela Janik
(Germany) Cottbus	Balance Beam	(Poland) Katarzyna Jurkowska-Kowalska	(Germany) Sophie Scheder	(Netherlands) Sanne Wevers
(Germany) Cottbus	Floor Exercise	(Netherlands) Lisa Top	(Poland) Katarzyna Jurkowska-Kowalska	(Germany) Sophie Scheder
(Slovenia) Ljubljana	Vault	(Puerto Rico) Paula Mejias	(Slovenia) Teja Belak	(Slovenia) Tjaša Kysselef
(Slovenia) Ljubljana	Uneven Bars	(Slovenia) Ivana Kamnikar	(Malaysia) Farah Ann Abdul Hadi	(Slovenia) Teja Belak
(Slovenia) Ljubljana	Balance Beam	(Malaysia) Tan Ing Yueh	(Slovenia) Adela Šajn	(Canada) Sydney Soloski
(Slovenia) Ljubljana	Floor Exercise	(Malaysia) Tracie Ang	(Canada) Sydney Soloski	(Hungary) Dorina Böczögő
(Croatia) Osijek	Vault	(United Kingdom) Ellie Downie	(Slovenia) Tjaša Kysselef	(Canada) Rose-Kaying Woo
(Croatia) Osijek	Uneven Bars	(United Kingdom) Ellie Downie	(Russia) Seda Tutkhalyan	(Russia) Natalia Kapitonova
(Croatia) Osijek	Balance Beam	(United Kingdom) Ellie Downie	(Russia) Maria Kharenkova	(Russia) Seda Tutkhalyan
(Croatia) Osijek	Floor Exercise	(United Kingdom) Ellie Downie	(Russia) Natalia Kapitonova	(Ukraine) Yana Horokhova
(Bulgaria) Varna	Vault	(Switzerland) Giulia Steingruber	(Vietnam) Phan Thị Hà Thanh	(Poland) Katarzyna Jurkowska-Kowalska
(Bulgaria) Varna	Uneven Bars	(Russia) Daria Skrypnik	(Russia) Evgenia Shelgunova	(Switzerland) Giulia Steingruber
(Bulgaria) Varna	Balance Beam	(France) Marine Boyer	(Vietnam) Phan Thị Hà Thanh	(Switzerland) Ilaria Käslin
(Bulgaria) Varna	Floor Exercise	(Switzerland) Giulia Steingruber	(Switzerland) Ilaria Käslin	(Russia) Evgenia Shelgunova
(Brazil) São Paulo	Vault	(Brazil) Daniele Hypólito	(Germany) Michelle Timm	(Finland) Annika Urvikko
(Brazil) São Paulo	Uneven Bars	(Venezuela) Jessica López	(Brazil) Rebeca Andrade (Germany) Kim Bùi	—N/a
(Brazil) São Paulo	Balance Beam	(Brazil) Daniele Hypólito	(Chile) Simona Castro	(Brazil) Rebeca Andrade
(Brazil) São Paulo	Floor Exercise	(Brazil) Daniele Hypólito	(Germany) Kim Bùi	(Brazil) Carolyne Pedro (Chile) Simona Castro
(Portugal) Anadia	Vault	(Cuba) Marcia Videaux	(Mexico) Alexa Moreno	(China) Wu Jing
(Portugal) Anadia	Uneven Bars	(Australia) Rianna Mizzen	(China) Xie Yufen	(China) Lü Jiaqi
(Portugal) Anadia	Balance Beam	(Brazil) Flávia Saraiva	(Brazil) Rebeca Andrade	(China) Lü Jiaqi
(Portugal) Anadia	Floor Exercise	(Brazil) Flávia Saraiva	(Brazil) Rebeca Andrade	(Italy) Vanessa Ferrari
(Turkey) Mersin	Vault	(Uzbekistan) Oksana Chusovitina	(Austria) Lisa Ecker	(Colombia) Catalina Escobar
(Turkey) Mersin	Uneven Bars	(Colombia) Catalina Escobar	(Turkey) Demet Mutlu	(Austria) Lisa Ecker
(Turkey) Mersin	Balance Beam	(Turkey) Tutya Yılmaz	(Uzbekistan) Oksana Chusovitina	(Austria) Lisa Ecker
(Turkey) Mersin	Floor Exercise	(Turkey) Göksu Üçtaş	(Austria) Lisa Ecker	(Colombia) Catalina Escobar
(Hungary) Szombathely	Vault	(China) Liu Jinru	(Australia) Emily Little	(Hungary) Boglárka Dévai
(Hungary) Szombathely	Uneven Bars	(China) Xie Yufen	(China) Lü Jiaqi	(Hungary) Zsófia Kovács
(Hungary) Szombathely	Balance Beam	(Australia) Emily Little (China) Lü Jiaqi	—N/a	(Czech Republic) Veronica Cenkova
(Hungary) Szombathely	Floor Exercise	(Hungary) Dorina Böczögő	(Czech Republic) Veronica Cenkova	(Croatia) Dora Kranzelic

==== World Cup Series ====
FIG World Cup
Competition	Event	Gold	Silver	Bronze
(United States) American Cup	All-around	(United States) Gabby Douglas	(United States) Maggie Nichols	(Canada) Ellie Black
(United Kingdom) Glasgow	All-around	(United States) MyKayla Skinner	(Germany) Elisabeth Seitz	(United Kingdom) Claudia Fragapane
(Germany) Stuttgart	All-around	(Germany) Sophie Scheder	(Canada) Isabela Onyshko	(United States) Amelia Hundley
(Germany) Cottbus	Vault	(Australia) Emily Little	(Hungary) Dorina Böczögő	(Hungary) Zsófia Kovács
(Germany) Cottbus	Uneven Bars	(Hungary) Zsófia Kovács	(Hungary) Dorina Böczögő	(Ukraine) Angelina Kysla
(Germany) Cottbus	Balance Beam	(Hungary) Zsófia Kovács	(Germany) Carina Kroell	(Hungary) Dorina Böczögő
(Germany) Cottbus	Floor Exercise	(Germany) Carina Kroell	(Germany) Leah Griesser	(Australia) Emily Little

=== National Championships ===
Note: Although England, Scotland, and Wales are listed as individual countries in the table below, gymnasts from these countries compete under the flag of Great Britain at all major international competitions, except for the Commonwealth Games.

National Championships
Nation	Event	Gold	Silver	Bronze
Australia	All-Around	Senior: Rianna Mizzen; Junior: Jade Vella-Wright	Senior: Georgia Rose Brown; Junior: Talia Folino	Senior: Emily Little; Junior: Eadie Rawson
Australia	Vault	Senior: Emily Little; Junior: Talia Folino	Senior: Kiara Munteanu; Junior: Cassidy Ercole	Senior: Naomi Lee; Junior: Elly Bayes
Australia	Uneven Bars	Senior: Rianna Mizzen; Junior: Talia Folino	Senior: Emily Whitehead; Junior: Lily Gresele	Senior: Georgia Godwin; Junior: Jade Vella-Wright
Australia	Balance Beam	Senior: Lauren Mitchell; Junior: Jade Vella-Wright	Senior: Emily Little; Junior: Shannon Farrell	Senior: Emma Nedov; Junior: Talia Folino
Australia	Floor Exercise	Senior: Larrissa Miller; Junior: Jade Vella-Wright	Senior: Emily Little; Junior: Talia Folino	Senior: Lauren Mitchell; Junior: Eadie Rawson
Brazil	All-Around	Senior: Rebeca Andrade; Junior: Thais Fidelis	Senior: Carolyne Pedro; Junior: Anna Reis	Senior: Milena Theodoro; Junior: Jackelyne Silva
Brazil	Vault	Raquel Silva	Gleyce Rodrigues	Leandra Gago
Brazil	Uneven Bars	Rebeca Andrade	Maria Cecília Cruz; Lorenna Rocha	—N/a
Brazil	Balance Beam	Rebeca Andrade	Thais Fidelis	Carolyne Pedro
Brazil	Floor Exercise	Thais Fidelis	Rebeca Andrade	Anna Reis
Canada	All-Around	Senior: Isabela Onyshko; Junior: Ana Padurariu	Senior: Ellie Black; Junior: Sayge Urban	Senior: Rose-Kaying Woo; Junior: Brooklyn Moors
Canada	Vault			
Canada	Uneven Bars			
Canada	Balance Beam			
Canada	Floor Exercise			
China	All-Around	Shang Chunsong	Mao Yi	Liu Tingting
China	Vault	Yuan Xiaoyang	Liu Jinru	Jing Yang
China	Uneven Bars	Fan Yilin	Tan Jiaxin	Huang Huidan
China	Balance Beam	Shang Chunsong	Liu Tingting	Chen Xiaoqing
China	Floor Exercise	Shang Chunsong	Mao Yi	Li Qi
England	All-Around	Senior: Claudia Fragapane; Junior: Alice Kinsella	Senior: Amy Tinkler; Junior: Taeja James	Senior: Abigail Solari; Junior: Lucy Stanhope
France	All-Around	Senior: Marine Boyer; Junior: Lorette Charpy	Senior: Juliette Bossu; Junior: Janna Mouffok	Senior: Anne Kuhm; Junior: Alisson Lapp
France	Vault	Coline Devillard	Morgane Osyssek-Reimer	Océane Pause
France	Uneven Bars	Loan His	Lorette Charpy	Anne Kuhm and Louise Vanhille
France	Balance Beam	Marine Boyer	Alisson Lapp	Lorette Charpy
France	Floor Exercise	Juliette Bossu	Louise Vanhille	Oréane Lechenault
Germany	All-Around	Sophie Scheder	Elisabeth Seitz	Pauline Schäfer
Germany	Vault			
Germany	Uneven Bars			
Germany	Balance Beam			
Germany	Floor Exercise			
Great Britain	All-Around	Senior: Claudia Fragapane; Junior: Maisie Methuen	Senior: Rebecca Tunney; Junior: Taeja James	Senior: Ellie Downie; Junior: Ellesse Oates
Great Britain	Vault	Senior: Ellie Downie; Junior: Sophie Scott	Senior: Claudia Fragapane; Junior: Maisie Methuen	Senior: Abigail Solari; Junior: Lucy Stanhope
Great Britain	Uneven Bars	Senior: Gabby Jupp; Junior: Megan Parker	Senior: Becky Downie; Junior: Ellesse Oates	Senior: Ruby Harrold; Junior: Lucy Stanhope
Great Britain	Balance Beam	Senior: Becky Downie; Junior: Alice Kinsella	Senior: Claudia Fragapane; Junior: Amelia Montague	Senior: Ruby Harrold; Junior: India Sale
Great Britain	Floor Exercise	Senior: Amy Tinkler; Junior: Zoe Simmons	Senior: Claudia Fragapane; Junior: Maisie Methuen	Senior: Phoebe Turner; Junior: Taeja James
Hungary	All-Around	Senior: Luca Divéky; Junior: Noémi Jakab	Senior: Boglárka Dévai; Junior: Dora Halasz	Senior: Dorina Böczögő; Junior: Boglárka Tömböl
Hungary	Vault	Senior: Boglárka Dévai; Junior: Dora Halasz	Senior: Luca Divéky; Junior: Boglárka Nemeth	Senior: Dorina Böczögő; Junior: Boglárka Tömböl
Hungary	Uneven Bars	Senior: Zsófia Kovács; Junior: Noémi Jakab	Senior: Dorina Böczögő; Junior: Dora Halasz	Senior: Dora Szekely; Junior: Boglárka Nemeth
Hungary	Balance Beam			
Hungary	Floor Exercise			
Italy	All-Around	Vanessa Ferrari	Carlotta Ferlito	Elisa Meneghini
Italy	Vault	Asia D'Amato	Martina Rizzelli and Arianna Rocca	
Italy	Uneven Bars	Martina Rizzelli	Vanessa Ferrari	Giorgia Villa
Italy	Balance Beam	Carlotta Ferlito and Elisa Meneghini		Lara Mori
Italy	Floor Exercise	Elisa Meneghini	Giorgia Villa	Erika Fasana
Japan	All-Around	Mai Murakami	Asuka Teramoto	Aiko Sugihara
Japan	Vault	Sae Miyakawa	Ayu Koike	Soyoka Hanawa
Japan	Uneven Bars	Asuka Teramoto	Aiko Sugihara	Marina Kawasaki
Japan	Balance Beam	Asuka Teramoto	Shima Himeko	Urara Ashiwaka
Japan	Floor Exercise	Mai Murakami	Aiko Sugihara	Shima Himeko
Netherlands	All-Around	Senior: Eythora Thorsdottir; Junior: Sanna Veerman; Espoir: Astrid de Zeeuw	Senior: Céline van Gerner; Junior: Naomi Visser; Espoir: Laura de Witt	Senior: Axelle Klinckaert; Junior: Marieke von Egmond; Espoir: Vera Jonker
Netherlands	Vault			
Netherlands	Uneven Bars			
Netherlands	Balance Beam			
Netherlands	Floor Exercise			
Romania	All-Around	Larisa Iordache	Ioana Crişan	Carmen Glăvan
Romania	Vault	Denisa Golgotă	Ioana Crişan	Ioana Oprea
Romania	Uneven Bars	Larisa Iordache	Anda Butuc	Maria Holbură
Romania	Balance Beam	Cătălina Ponor	Larisa Iordache	Andreea Ciuruşniuc
Romania	Floor Exercise	Cătălina Ponor	Denisa Golgotă	Ioana Crişan, Maria Holbură, and Ana Maria Puiu
Russia	All-Around	Senior: Angelina Melnikova; Junior (MS): Anastasia Ilyankova; Junior (CMS): Ksenia Klimenko	Senior: Seda Tutkhalyan; Junior (MS): Yuliana Perebinosova; Junior (CMS): Aleksandra Shekoldina	Senior: Maria Kharenkova; Junior (MS): Elena Eremina; Junior (CMS): Varvara Zubova
Russia	Vault	Senior: Seda Tutkhalyan; Junior (MS): Yuliana Perebinosova; Junior (CMS): Aleksandra Shekoldina	Senior: Tatiana Nabieva; Junior (MS): Elena Eremina; Junior (CMS): Anastasia Budylkina and Viktoria Gorbatova	Senior: Anastasia Dmitrieva; Junior (MS): Anastasia Ilyankova; Junior (CMS): N/A
Russia	Uneven Bars	Senior: Daria Skrypnik and Daria Spiridonova; Junior (MS): Anastasia Ilyankova; Junior (CMS): Ksenia Klimenko	Senior: N/A; Junior (MS): Elena Eremina; Junior (CMS): Anastasia Agafonova	Senior: Aliya Mustafina; Junior (MS): Yuliana Perebinosova; Junior (CMS): Elizaveta Serova
Russia	Balance Beam	Senior: Angelina Melnikova; Junior (MS): Elena Eremina; Junior (CMS): Ksenia Klimenko	Senior: Maria Kharenkova; Junior (MS): Yuliana Perebinosova; Junior (CMS): Taisia Borozdyko and Aleksandra Shekoldina	Senior: Aliya Mustafina; Junior (MS): Angelina Simakova; Junior (CMS): N/A
Russia	Floor Exercise	Senior: Ksenia Afanasyeva and Angelina Melnikova; Junior (MS): Anastasia Ilyankova; Junior (CMS): Varvara Zubova	Senior: N/A; Junior (MS): Angelina Simakova; Junior (CMS): Viktoria Gorbatova	Senior: Maria Kharenkova; Junior (MS): Polina Borzykh; Junior (CMS): Ksenia Klimenko
Scotland	All-Around	Senior: Cara Kennedy	Senior: Sofia Ramzan	Senior: Shannon Archer
Scotland	Vault	Senior: Amy Regan	Senior: Shannon Archer	Senior: Joanne Lowe
Scotland	Uneven Bars	Senior: Cara Kennedy and Isabella Tolometti	Senior: N/A	Senior: Sofia Ramzan
Scotland	Balance Beam	Senior: Cara Kennedy	Senior: Shannon Archer	Senior: Sofia Ramzan
Scotland	Floor Exercise	Senior: Shannon Archer	Senior: Cara Kennedy	Senior: Isabella Tolometti
United States	All-Around	Senior: Simone Biles; Junior: Maile O'Keefe	Senior: Aly Raisman; Junior: Riley McCusker	Senior: Laurie Hernandez; Junior: Gabby Perea
United States	Vault	Senior: Simone Biles; Junior: Chae Campbell	Senior: MyKayla Skinner; Junior: Madeleine Johnston	Senior: N/A; Junior: Maile O'Keefe
United States	Uneven Bars	Senior: Ashton Locklear; Junior: Gabby Perea	Senior: Madison Kocian; Junior: Riley McCusker	Senior: Laurie Hernandez; Junior: Morgan Hurd
United States	Balance Beam	Senior: Simone Biles; Junior: Maile O'Keefe	Senior: Aly Raisman; Junior: Riley McCusker	Senior: Laurie Hernandez; Junior: Shania Adams
United States	Floor Exercise	Senior: Simone Biles; Junior: Maile O'Keefe	Senior: Aly Raisman; Junior: Riley McCusker	Senior: Laurie Hernandez and MyKayla Skinner; Junior: Shilese Jones
Wales	All-Around	Senior: Rebecca Moore	Senior: Hana Davies	Senior: Raer Theaker
Wales	Vault	Senior: Rebecca Moore	Senior: Hana Davies	Senior: N/A
Wales	Uneven Bars	Senior: Rebecca Moore	Senior: Hana Davies	Senior: N/A
Wales	Balance Beam	Senior: Rebecca Moore	Senior: Raer Theaker	Senior: Hana Davies
Wales	Floor Exercise	Senior: Rebecca Moore	Senior: Hana Davies	Senior: N/A

== Season's best international scores ==
Note: Only the scores of senior gymnasts from international events have been included below. In major international competitions such as the World Championships, countries are limited to only two athletes in each final. Finalists in the 2016 Olympic Games are highlighted in green.

=== All-around ===
Rank	Name	Country	Score	Event
1	Simone Biles	United States	62.450	Pac Rims TF
2	Aly Raisman	United States	60.607	Olympic Games QF
3	Gabby Douglas	United States	60.165	American Cup
4	Aliya Mustafina	Russia	60.024	Olympic Games TF
5	Laurie Hernandez	United States	59.800	Pac Rims TF
6	Maggie Nichols	United States	59.699	American Cup
7	Ragan Smith	United States	59.050	City of Jesolo Trophy QF
8	Brenna Dowell	United States	58.850	Pac Rims TF
9	Rebeca Andrade	Brazil	58.732	Olympic Games QF
9	Angelina Melnikova	Russia	58.732	Euros TF
11	Evgenia Shelgunova	Russia	58.666	Igor Vihrov Cup
12	Shang Chunsong	China	58.549	Olympic Games AA
13	Flávia Saraiva	Brazil	58.400	City of Jesolo Trophy QF
14	Elsabeth Black	Canada	58.298	Olympic Games AA
15	Seda Tutkhalyan	Russia	58.207	Olympic Games QF
16	Eythora Thorsdottir	Netherlands	58.199	Olympic Games TF
17	Wang Yan	China	58.032	Olympic Games AA
18	Jessica López	Venezuela	57.966	Olympic Games AA
19	Asuka Teramoto	Japan	57.965	Olympic Games AA
20	MyKayla Skinner	United States	57.900	City of Jesolo Trophy QF

=== Vault ===
Rank	Name	Country	Score	Event
1	Simone Biles	United States	16.050	Olympic Games QF
2	Hong Un-jong	North Korea	15.683	Olympic Games QF
3	Giulia Steingruber	Switzerland	15.433	Euros QF
4	Oksana Chusovitina	Uzbekistan	15.325	Mersin Challenge Cup EF
5	Maria Paseka	Russia	15.253	Olympic Games EF
6	Dipa Karmakar	India	15.066	Olympic Games EF
7	Wang Yan	China	14.999	Olympic Games EF
8	Alexa Moreno	Mexico	14.950	Anadia Challenge Cup QF
8	Shallon Olsen	Canada	14.950	Olympic Games QF
10	Ellie Downie	Great Britain	14.933	Euros EF
11	Marcia Videaux	Cuba	14.925	Anadia Challenge Cup EF
12	Ksenia Afanasyeva	Russia	14.753	Euros QF
13	Seda Tutkhalyan	Russia	14.733	Olympic Games QF
14	Wu Jing	China	14.712	Anadia Challenge Cup EF
15	Sofia Busato	Italy	14.687	Anadia Challenge Cup EF
16	Brittany Rogers	Canada	14.675	Pac Rims TF
17	Sae Miyakawa	Japan	14.612	Gymnix Senior Cup EF
18	Emily Little	Australia	14.600	Anadia Challenge Cup EF
19	Claudia Fragapane	Great Britain	14.549	Euros EF
20	Zsófia Kovács	Hungary	14.512	Olympic Games QF

=== Uneven bars ===
Rank	Name	Country	Score	Event
1	Madison Kocian	United States	15.933	Olympic Games TF
1	Aliya Mustafina	Russia	15.933	Olympic Games TF
3	Gabby Douglas	United States	15.766	Olympic Games QF
4	Fan Yilin	China	15.733	Olympic Games TF
5	Daria Spiridonova	Russia	15.683	Olympic Games QF
6	Ashton Locklear	United States	15.650	City of Jesolo Trophy QF
7	Sophie Scheder	Germany	15.566	Olympic Games EF
8	Elisabeth Seitz	Germany	15.533	Olympic Games TF
9	Becky Downie	Great Britain	15.500	Euros EF
10	Shang Chunsong	China	15.433	Olympic Games EF
11	Jessica López	Venezuela	15.333	Olympic Games QF
12	Nina Derwael	Belgium	15.300	Olympic Games AA
13	Brenna Dowell	United States	15.250	Pac Rims TF
14	Natalia Kapitonova	Russia	15.133	DTB Team Challenge TF
14	Angelina Melnikova	Russia	15.133	Olympic Games TF
14	Seda Tutkhalyan	Russia	15.133	Olympic Games QF
17	Daria Skrypnik	Russia	15.067	Varna Challenge Cup EF
18	Simone Biles	United States	15.050	Pac Rims TF
19	Jonna Adlerteg	Sweden	15.000	Doha Challenge Cup QF
19	Emily Schild	United States	15.000	City of Jesolo Trophy QF
19	Yuki Uchiyama	Japan	15.000	Olympic Games TF

=== Balance beam ===
Rank	Name	Country	Score	Event
1	Simone Biles	United States	15.633	Olympic Games QF
2	Madison Kocian	United States	15.550	WOGA Classic
3	Sanne Wevers	Netherlands	15.466	Olympic Games EF
4	Laurie Hernandez	United States	15.366	Olympic Games QF
5	Evgenia Shelgunova	Russia	15.250	Antonia Koshel Cup
6	Ragan Smith	United States	15.225	Pac Rims EF
7	Flávia Saraiva	Brazil	15.150	Baku Challenge Cup QF
8	Aliya Mustafina	Russia	15.100	Euros EF
8	Aly Raisman	United States	15.100	Pac Rims EF
10	Fan Yilin	China	15.066	Olympic Games TF
10	Shang Chunsong	China	15.066	Olympic Games TF
12	Gabby Douglas	United States	14.966	American Cup
13	Ellie Downie	Great Britain	14.950	Osijek Challenge Cup EF
14	Maria Kharenkova	Russia	14.925	Osijek Challenge Cup EF
15	Cătălina Ponor	Romania	14.900	Olympic Games QF
16	Marine Boyer	France	14.850	City of Jesolo Trophy QF
17	Maggie Nichols	United States	14.833	American Cup
18	Angelina Melnikova	Russia	14.800	Euros TF
18	Seda Tutkhalyan	Russia	14.800	Stuttgart World Cup
20	Giulia Steingruber	Switzerland	14.766	DTB Team Challenge Cup TF

=== Floor exercise ===
Rank	Name	Country	Score	Event
1	Simone Biles	United States	16.050	Pac Rims TF
2	Aly Raisman	United States	15.600	Pac Rims TF
3	Maggie Nichols	United States	15.200	American Cup
3	Giulia Steingruber	Switzerland	15.200	Euros EF
5	Claudia Fragapane	Great Britain	15.000	Euros QF
6	Laurie Hernandez	United States	14.950	Pac Rims TF
7	Amy Tinkler	United Kingdom	14.933	Olympic Games EF
8	Wang Yan	China	14.900	Olympic Games AA
9	Vanessa Ferrari	Italy	14.866	Olympic Games QF
10	Gabby Douglas	United States	14.833	American Cup
11	Brenna Dowell	United States	14.825	Pac Rims EF
12	Shang Chunsong	China	14.700	Olympic Games TF
13	Ragan Smith	United States	14.650	City of Jesolo Trophy EF
14	Ellie Downie	Great Britain	14.566	Euros EF
14	Mai Murakami	Japan	14.566	Olympic Games QF
14	Cătălina Ponor	Romania	14.566	Euros QF
17	Eythora Thorsdottir	Netherlands	14.533	Olympic Games AA
17	Erika Fasana	Italy	14.533	Olympic Games EF
19	Paula Mejias	Puerto Rico	14.500	Houston National Invitational
19	Evgenia Shelgunova	Russia	14.500	Igor Vihrov Cup
19	Flávia Saraiva	Brazil	14.500	Olympic Games TF
