= Gymnastics at the 2018 Commonwealth Games – Women's artistic team all-around =

Women's artistic team all-around at the 2018 Commonwealth Games
- Venue: Coomera Indoor Sports Centre
- Dates: 6 April 2018
- Competitors: 35 from 8 nations
- Winning score: 163.075

Medalists
gold medal	Ellie Black; Shallon Olsen; Isabela Onyshko; Brittany Rogers; Jade Chrobok	Canada
silver medal	Georgia-Mae Fenton; Lucy Stanhope; Alice Kinsella; Kelly Simm; Taeja James	England
bronze medal	Georgia Rose Brown; Alexandra Eade; Georgia Godwin; Rianna Mizzen; Emily Whitehead	Australia

The Women's artistic team all-around gymnastics competition at the 2018 Commonwealth Games in Gold Coast, Australia was held on 6 April 2018 at the Coomera Indoor Sports Centre.

This event also determined the qualification standings for the individual all-around and apparatus finals.

== Schedule ==
The schedule is as follows:

All times are Australian Eastern Standard Time (UTC+10)

Date	Time	Round
Thursday 6 April 2018	09:09	Competition

== Results ==
=== Team competition ===
The results are as follows:

Rank	Country	Vault (gymnastics)	Uneven bars	Balance beam	Floor (gymnastics)	Total
1st place, gold medalist(s)	Canada	43.650	40.925	39.000	39.500	163.075
1st place, gold medalist(s)	Ellie Black	14.300	~~12.500~~	13.650	13.450	163.075
1st place, gold medalist(s)	Shallon Olsen	14.800	–	–	13.250	163.075
1st place, gold medalist(s)	Isabela Onyshko	~~13.350~~	13.700	13.100	12.800	163.075
1st place, gold medalist(s)	Brittany Rogers	14.550	14.200	12.250	–	163.075
1st place, gold medalist(s)	Jade Chrobok	–	13.025	~~11.550~~	~~12.700~~	163.075
2nd place, silver medalist(s)	England	42.150	41.700	38.850	39.950	162.650
2nd place, silver medalist(s)	Georgia-Mae Fenton	–	14.600	12.450	–	162.650
2nd place, silver medalist(s)	Lucy Stanhope	14.300	–	~~10.350~~	~~11.500~~	162.650
2nd place, silver medalist(s)	Alice Kinsella	13.900	13.350	13.350	13.000	162.650
2nd place, silver medalist(s)	Kelly Simm	13.950	13.750	13.050	12.850	162.650
2nd place, silver medalist(s)	Taeja James	~~12.400~~	~~13.000~~	–	14.100	162.650
3rd place, bronze medalist(s)	Australia	41.350	40.950	37.050	38.100	157.450
3rd place, bronze medalist(s)	Georgia Rose Brown	13.600	14.000	12.650	12.450	157.450
3rd place, bronze medalist(s)	Alexandra Eade	–	–	–	13.250	157.450
3rd place, bronze medalist(s)	Georgia Godwin	~~13.600~~	13.800	11.950	~~11.800~~	157.450
3rd place, bronze medalist(s)	Rianna Mizzen	13.700	~~11.900~~	~~11.700~~	~~12.400~~	157.450
3rd place, bronze medalist(s)	Emily Whitehead	14.050	13.150	12.450	–	157.450
4	Wales	40.775	38.100	38.500	38.600	155.975
4	Latalia Bevan	13.400	12.900	12.750	13.000	155.975
4	Holly Jones	13.850	–	–	~~11.850~~	155.975
4	Maisie Methuen	~~13.300~~	13.150	13.250	12.600	155.975
4	Jolie Ruckley	–	12.050	~~12.300~~	–	155.975
4	Emily Thomas	13.525	~~11.950~~	12.500	13.000	155.975
5	Scotland	40.060	33.300	33.200	35.850	142.950
5	Shannon Archer	13.900	11.050	11.350	12.050	142.950
5	Cara Kennedy	13.550	10.950	11.200	11.900	142.950
5	Sofia Ramzan	–	–	~~10.400~~	~~11.500~~	142.950
5	Ellie Russell	13.150	~~10.500~~	–	–	142.950
5	Isabella Tolometti	~~12.450~~	11.300	10.650	11.900	142.950
6	Malaysia	37.850	34.650	31.100	34.250	137.850
6	Farah Ann Abdul Hadi	13.550	12.550	10.400	11.800	137.850
6	Geanie Ng	DNS				137.850
6	Nur Azira Aziri	11.450	10.450	9.850	11.150	137.850
6	Tan Ing Yueh	12.850	11.650	10.850	11.300	137.850
7	India	39.050	29.325	29.700	31.900	128.975
7	Aruna Reddy	13.200	9.800	10.150	11.300	128.975
7	Pranati Das	12.600	9.750	10.150	11.300	128.975
7	Pranati Nayak	13.250	9.775	9.400	10.250	128.975
8	Sri Lanka	35.250	21.850	24.150	27.350	108.600
8	Ridma Bengalage	11.850	8.250	8.700	9.650	108.600
8	Kaushini Gamage	11.600	6.900	7.000	8.350	108.600
8	Amaya Kalukottage	11.800	6.700	8.450	9.350	108.600

== Qualification results ==
=== Individual all-around ===
The results are as follows:

Position	Gymnast	Vault (gymnastics)	Uneven bars	Balance beam	Floor (gymnastics)	Total	Notes
1	Ellie Black (CAN)	14.300	12.500	13.650	13.450	53.900	Q
2	Kelly Simm (ENG)	13.950	13.750	13.050	12.850	53.600	Q
3	Alice Kinsella (ENG)	13.900	13.350	13.350	13.000	53.600	Q
4	Isabela Onyshko (CAN)	13.350	13.700	13.100	12.800	52.950	Q
5	Georgia Rose Brown (AUS)	13.600	14.000	12.650	12.450	52.700	Q
6	Maisie Methuen (WAL)	13.300	13.150	13.250	12.600	52.300	Q
7	Latalia Bevan (WAL)	13.400	12.900	12.750	13.000	52.050	Q
8	Georgia Godwin (AUS)	13.600	13.800	11.950	11.800	51.150	Q
9	Emily Thomas (WAL)	13.525	11.950	12.500	13.000	50.975	–
10	Rianna Mizzen (AUS)	13.700	11.900	11.700	12.400	49.700	–
11	Shannon Archer (SCO)	13.900	11.050	11.350	12.050	48.350	Q
12	Farah Ann Abdul Hadi (MAS)	13.550	12.550	10.400	11.800	48.300	Q
13	Cara Kennedy (SCO)	13.550	10.950	11.200	11.900	47.600	Q
14	Tan Ing Yueh (MAS)	12.850	11.650	10.850	11.300	46.650	Q
15	Isabella Tolometti (SCO)	12.450	11.300	10.650	11.900	46.300	–
16	Claudia Cummins (RSA)	13.400	11.775	9.700	11.150	46.025	Q
17	Stella Ashcroft (NZL)	13.100	10.000	11.750	10.875	45.725	Q
18	Naveen Daries (RSA)	12.950	11.700	10.400	10.300	45.350	Q
19	Nicole Burns (IOM)	12.250	10.600	11.900	10.375	45.125	Q
20	Bonita Shurmer (JER)	12.100	10.450	11.200	10.400	44.150	Q
21	Pranati Das (IND)	12.600	9.750	10.150	11.300	43.800	Q
22	Aruna Reddy (IND)	13.200	9.800	10.150	10.350	43.500	R1
23	Nur Azira Aziri (MAS)	11.450	10.450	9.850	11.150	42.900	–
24	Pranati Nayak (IND)	13.250	9.775	9.400	10.250	42.675	–
25	Rachelle Flambard (JER)	12.150	8.850	9.650	11.100	42.750	R2
26	Sana Grillo (MLT)	12.250	7.950	11.200	9.950	41.350	R3
27	Eleni Eliades (CYP)	12.100	8.350	9.900	10.000	40.350	R4
28	Gloria Philassides (CYP)	12.050	7.800	9.350	10.100	39.300	
29	Ridma Bengalage (SRI)	11.850	8.250	8.700	9.650	38.450	
30	Raegan Rutty (CAY)	11.600	7.350	7.300	10.100	36.350	
31	Amaya Kalukottage (SRI)	11.800	6.700	8.450	9.350	36.300	
32	Kaushini Gamage (SRI)	11.600	6.900	7.000	8.350	33.850	
33	Samantha Peene (CAY)	9.500	8.950	4.950	8.975	32.375	
–	Geanie Ng (MAS)	DNS					

=== Vault ===
The results are as follows:

Rank	Name	D Score	E Score	Pen.	Score 1	D Score	E Score	Pen.	Score 2	Total	Qualification
Rank	Name	Vault 1				Vault 2				Total	Qualification
1	Shallon Olsen (CAN)	6.000	8.800		14.800	5.400	9.000		14.400	14.600	Q
2	Ellie Black (CAN)	5.400	8.900		14.300	5.200	9.100		14.300	14.300	Q
3	Brittany Rogers (CAN)	5.400	9.150		14.550	5.200	8.750		13.950	14.250	–
4	Emily Whitehead (AUS)	5.000	9.050		14.050	4.800	8.600		13.400	13.725	Q
5	Shannon Archer (SCO)	5.000	8.900		13.900	4.800	8.600		13.400	13.650	Q
6	Holly Jones (WAL)	5.000	8.850		13.850	4.400	9.000		13.400	13.625	Q
7	Georgia Godwin (AUS)	4.800	8.800		13.600	4.600	8.750		13.350	13.475	Q
8	Cara Kennedy (SCO)	5.000	8.650	0.100	13.550	4.800	8.250		13.050	13.300	Q
9	Pranati Nayak (IND)	4.800	8.450		13.250	4.800	8.550		13.350	13.300	Q
10	Emily Thomas (WAL)	4.600	8.925		13.525	4.200	8.850		13.050	13.287	R1
11	Aruna Reddy (IND)	4.600	8.600		13.200	4.800	8.400		13.200	13.200	R2
12	Claudia Cummins (RSA)	4.600	8.800		13.400	4.400	8.300		12.700	13.050	R3
13	Ellie Russell (SCO)	4.600	8.550		13.150	4.200	8.600		12.800	12.975	–
14	Taeja James (ENG)	5.000	7.700	0.300	12.400	4.800	8.550		13.350	12.875	R4
15	Stella Ashcroft (NZL)	4.400	8.700		13.100	4.200	7.650	0.300	11.550	12.325	
16	Sana Grillo (MLT)	4.200	8.350	0.300	12.250	4.000	8.400		12.400	12.325	
17	Rachelle Flambard (JER)	3.700	8.450		12.150	4.000	8.450		12.450	12.300	
18	Eleni Eliades (CYP)	3.700	8.400		12.100	3.300	8.200		11.500	11.800	
19	Ridma Bengalage (SRI)	3.700	8.150		11.850	3.000	8.500		11.500	11.675	
20	Bonita Shurmer (JER)	3.500	8.600		12.100	3.700	8.150	2.000	9.850	10.975	
21	Gloria Philassides (CYP)	3.700	8.350		12.050	3.500	8.375	2.000	9.875	10.962	

=== Uneven bars ===
The results are as follows:

Rank	Gymnast	Difficulty	Execution	Penalty	Total	Notes
1	Georgia-Mae Fenton (ENG)	5.900	8.700		14.600	Q
2	Brittany Rogers (CAN)	5.900	8.300		14.200	Q
3	Georgia Rose Brown (AUS)	5.500	8.500		14.000	Q
4	Georgia Godwin (AUS)	5.400	8.400		13.800	Q
5	Kelly Simm (ENG)	5.400	8.350		13.750	Q
6	Isabela Onyshko (CAN)	5.800	7.900		13.700	Q
7	Alice Kinsella (ENG)	5.000	8.350		13.350	–
8	Maisie Methuen (WAL)	4.900	8.250		13.150	Q
9	Emily Whitehead (AUS)	5.000	8.150		13.150	–
10	Jade Chrobok (CAN)	4.900	8.125		13.025	–
11	Taeja James (ENG)	4.900	8.100		13.000	–
12	Latalia Bevan (WAL)	4.700	8.200		12.900	Q
13	Farah Ann Abdul Hadi (MAS)	5.000	7.550		12.550	R1
14	Ellie Black (CAN)	5.500	7.000		12.500	–
15	Jolie Ruckley (WAL)	4.500	7.550		12.050	–
16	Emily Thomas (WAL)	4.300	7.650		11.950	–
17	Rianna Mizzen (AUS)	5.500	6.400		11.900	–
18	Claudia Cummins (RSA)	4.400	7.375		11.775	R2
19	Naveen Daries (RSA)	4.800	6.900		11.700	R3
20	Tan Ing Yueh (MAS)	5.000	6.650		11.650	R4
21	Isabella Tolometti (SCO)	4.100	7.200		11.300	
22	Shannon Archer (SCO)	2.900	8.150		11.050	
23	Cara Kennedy (SCO)	3.500	7.450		10.950	
24	Nicole Burns (IOM)	2.900	7.700		10.600	
25	Ellie Russell (SCO)	4.100	6.400		10.500	
26	Bonita Shurmer (JER)	3.200	7.250		10.450	
27	Nur Azira Aziri (MAS)	4.200	6.250		10.450	
28	Colette Chan (SGP)	4.200	6.000		10.200	
29	Stella Ashcroft (NZL)	2.400	7.600		10.000	
30	Aruna Reddy (IND)	3.700	6.400	0.300	9.800	
31	Pranati Nayak (IND)	4.000	5.775		9.775	
32	Pranati Das (IND)	3.800	6.250	0.300	9.750	
33	Samantha Peene (CAY)	1.800	7.150		8.950	
34	Rachelle Flambard (JER)	1.400	7.450		8.850	
35	Eleni Eliades (CYP)	2.300	6.050		8.350	
36	Ridma Bengalage (SRI)	1.500	6.750		8.250	
37	Sana Grillo (MLT)	1.400	6.550		7.950	
38	Gloria Philassides (CYP)	2.700	5.100		7.800	
39	Raegan Rutty (CAY)	2.100	5.250		7.350	
40	Kaushini Gamage (SRI)	1.400	5.500		6.900	
41	Amaya Kalukottage (SRI)	1.600	5.100		6.700	
–	Geanie Ng (MAS)	DNS				

=== Balance beam ===
The results are as follows:

Rank	Gymnast	Difficulty	Execution	Penalty	Total	Notes
1	Ellie Black (CAN)	5.700	7.950		13.650	Q
2	Alice Kinsella (ENG)	5.200	8.150		13.350	Q
3	Maisie Methuen (WAL)	5.400	7.850		13.250	Q
4	Isabela Onyshko (CAN)	5.800	7.300		13.100	Q
5	Kelly Simm (ENG)	4.900	8.150		13.050	Q
6	Latalia Bevan (WAL)	5.100	7.650		12.750	Q
7	Georgia Rose Brown (AUS)	4.500	8.150		12.650	Q
8	Emily Thomas (WAL)	5.100	7.400		12.500	–
9	Emily Whitehead (AUS)	4.700	7.750		12.450	Q
10	Georgia-Mae Fenton (ENG)	5.100	7.350		12.450	–
11	Jolie Ruckley (WAL)	4.800	7.500		12.300	–
12	Brittany Rogers (CAN)	5.300	7.050	0.100	12.250	–
13	Georgia Godwin (AUS)	5.300	6.650		11.950	–
14	Nicole Burns (IOM)	4.400	7.600	0.100	11.900	R1
15	Stella Ashcroft (NZL)	5.000	6.750		11.750	R2
16	Rianna Mizzen (AUS)	4.900	6.800		11.700	–
17	Jade Chrobok (CAN)	5.000	6.550		11.550	–
18	Shannon Archer (SCO)	4.600	6.750		11.350	R3
19	Bonita Shurmer (JER)	4.000	7.200		11.200	R4
19	Sana Grillo (MLT)	4.000	7.200		11.200	R4
21	Cara Kennedy (SCO)	4.800	6.400		11.200	
22	Tan Ing Yueh (MAS)	5.200	5.650		10.850	
23	Isabella Tolometti (SCO)	4.700	5.950		10.650	
24	Sofia Ramzan (SCO)	4.400	6.000		10.400	
25	Naveen Daries (RSA)	4.700	5.700		10.400	
26	Farah Ann Abdul Hadi (MAS)	4.800	5.600		10.400	
27	Lucy Stanhope (ENG)	4.900	5.450		10.350	
28	Pranati Das (IND)	4.700	5.850	0.400	10.150	
29	Aruna Reddy (IND)	4.700	5.750	0.300	10.150	
30	Eleni Eliades (CYP)	3.700	6.200		9.900	
31	Nur Azira Aziri (MAS)	3.800	6.050		9.850	
32	Claudia Cummins (RSA)	4.400	5.300		9.700	
33	Rachelle Flambard (JER)	4.300	5.350		9.650	
34	Pranati Nayak (IND)	4.600	5.100	0.300	9.400	
35	Gloria Philassides (CYP)	4.400	4.950		9.350	
36	Ridma Bengalage (SRI)	3.800	4.900		8.700	
37	Amaya Kalukottage (SRI)	2.400	6.050		8.450	
38	Raegan Rutty (CAY)	3.900	3.400		7.300	
39	Kaushini Gamage (SRI)	2.200	4.800		7.000	
40	Samantha Peene (CAY)	2.100	6.850	4.000	4.950	
–	Geanie Ng (MAS)	DNS				

=== Floor ===
The results are as follows:

Rank	Gymnast	Difficulty	Execution	Penalty	Total	Notes
1	Taeja James (ENG)	5.500	8.600		14.100	Q
2	Ellie Black (CAN)	4.800	8.650		13.450	Q
3	Alexandra Eade (AUS)	5.100	8.150		13.250	Q
4	Shallon Olsen (CAN)	5.400	7.850		13.250	Q
5	Latalia Bevan (WAL)	4.800	8.200		13.000	Q
6	Alice Kinsella (ENG)	4.900	8.100		13.000	Q
7	Emily Thomas (WAL)	5.100	7.900		13.000	Q
8	Kelly Simm (ENG)	5.000	8.050	0.200	12.850	–
9	Isabela Onyshko (CAN)	4.900	7.900		12.800	–
10	Jade Chrobok (CAN)	4.900	7.800		12.700	–
11	Maisie Methuen (WAL)	4.900	7.700		12.600	–
12	Georgia Rose Brown (AUS)	4.500	8.250	0.300	12.450	Q
13	Rianna Mizzen (AUS)	4.700	7.700		12.400	–
14	Shannon Archer (SCO)	4.300	7.750		12.050	R1
15	Isabella Tolometti (SCO)	4.100	7.800		11.900	R2
16	Cara Kennedy (SCO)	4.400	7.500		11.900	–
17	Holly Jones (WAL)	4.800	7.350	0.300	11.850	–
18	Farah Ann Abdul Hadi (MAS)	4.600	7.200		11.800	R3
19	Georgia Godwin (AUS)	5.300	6.500		11.800	–
20	Sofia Ramzan (SCO)	4.200	7.300		11.500	–
21	Lucy Stanhope (ENG)	4.700	7.100	0.300	11.500	–
22	Tan Ing Yueh (MAS)	4.500	7.100	0.300	11.300	R4
23	Pranati Das (IND)	4.500	6.800		11.300	
24	Claudia Cummins (RSA)	3.800	7.650	0.300	11.150	
25	Nur Azira Aziri (MAS)	4.200	7.050	0.100	11.150	
26	Rachelle Flambard (JER)	4.000	7.200	0.100	11.100	
27	Stella Ashcroft (NZL)	4.500	6.375		10.875	
28	Bonita Shurmer (JER)	3.900	6.600	0.100	10.400	
29	Nicole Burns (IOM)	4.100	6.375	0.100	10.375	
30	Aruna Reddy (IND)	4.600	6.350	0.600	10.350	
31	Naveen Daries (RSA)	4.100	6.200		10.300	
32	Pranati Nayak (IND)	4.400	6.050	0.200	10.250	
33	Raegan Rutty (CAY)	3.400	6.700		10.100	
34	Gloria Philassides (CYP)	3.700	6.400		10.100	
35	Eleni Eliades (CYP)	3.900	6.100		10.000	
36	Sana Grillo (MLT)	3.500	6.550	0.100	9.950	
37	Ridma Bengalage (SRI)	4.100	5.550		9.650	
38	Amaya Kalukottage (SRI)	3.700	5.650		9.350	
39	Samantha Peene (CAY)	2.700	6.275		8.975	
40	Kaushini Gamage (SRI)	2.800	5.550		8.350	
–	Geanie Ng (MAS)	DNS				
