= Rianna Mizzen =

Australian artistic gymnast

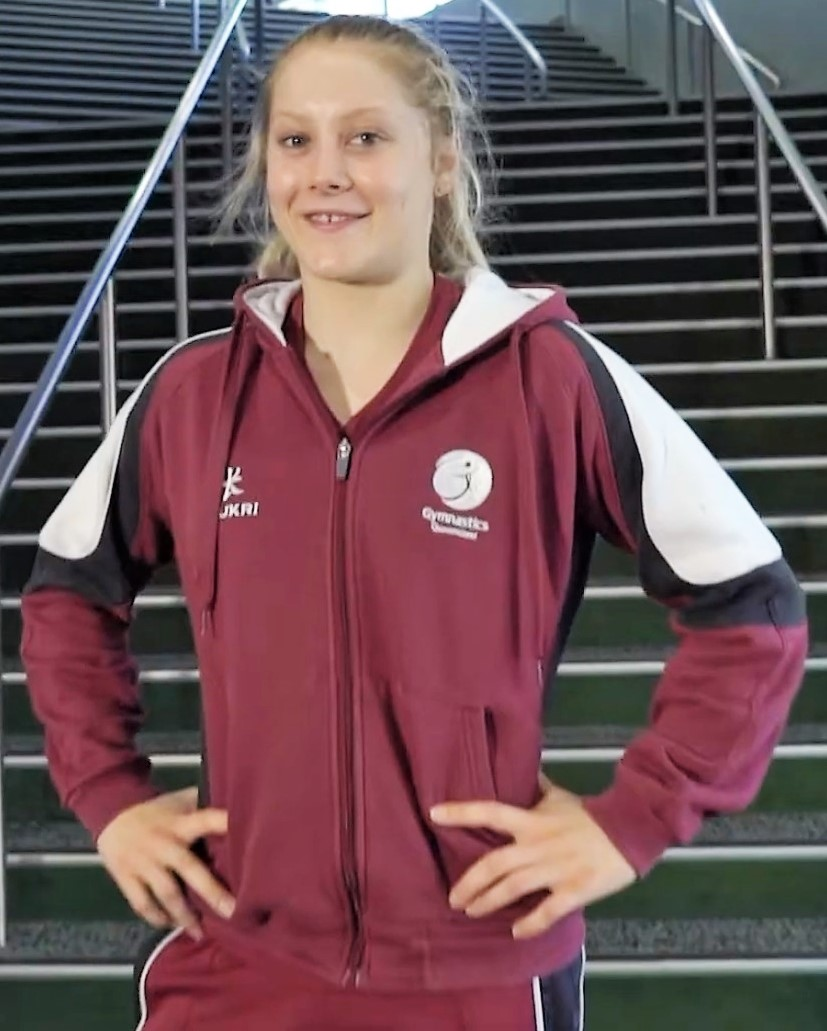
- Mizzen at the 2018 Australian Championships

Personal information
- Full name: Rianna Leigh Mizzen
- Nickname: Ri
- Born: 12 August 1999 (age 27) Grafton, New South Wales, Australia
- Height: 159 cm (5 ft 3 in)

Gymnastics career
- Discipline: Women's artistic gymnastics
- Country represented: Australia
- Club: Gymnastics Queensland High Performance Centre
- Head coach: Mikhail Barabach
- Retired: 2019
Medal record
Representing Australia
Commonwealth Games
Bronze medal – third place	2018 Gold Coast	Team
Pacific Rim Championships
Bronze medal – third place	2016 Everett	Team
FIG World Cup
Event	1st	2nd	3rd
Apparatus World Cup	0	1	1
World Challenge Cup	1	0	0
Total	1	1	1

Rianna Leigh Mizzen (born 8 December 1999) is an Australian former artistic gymnast. She was a member of the teams that won bronze medals at the 2018 Commonwealth Games and the 2016 Pacific Rim Championships. She is the 2016 Australian all-around champion and a three-time Australian champion on the uneven bars.

== Early life ==
Rianna Mizzen was born on 8 December 1999 in Grafton, New South Wales. She began gymnastics when she was six years old, and she began training at the Gymnastics Queensland High Performance Centre when she was nine.

== Junior gymnastics career ==
Mizzen made her international debut at the 2013 Australian Youth Olympic Festival and helped Australia win the team bronze behind China and Great Britain. Then at the 2013 Australian Championships, she placed sixth in the all-around and won the bronze medal on the uneven bars.

At the 2014 Australian Championships, Mizzen finished eighth in the all-around and fifth on the uneven bars. She then went to the Elite Gym Massilia in Marseille and placed tenth with the Australian team and thirtieth in the all-around.

== Senior gymnastics career ==
=== 2015-2016 ===
Mizzen won the gold medal on the uneven bars at the 2015 Australian Championships. She then made her senior international debut at a friendly meet against China and placed seventh on the uneven bars.

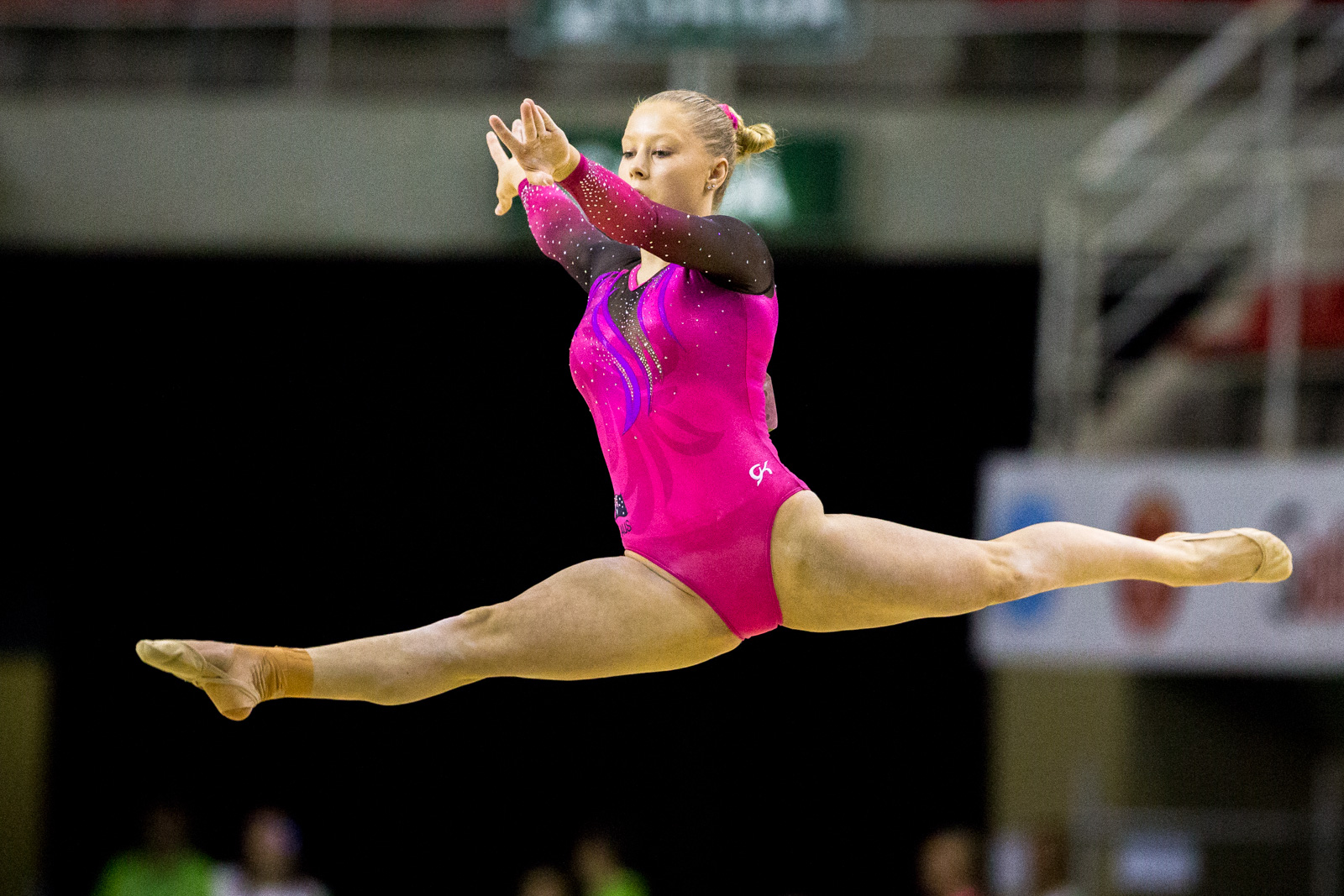
Mizzen competing at the 2016 Olympic Test Event

Mizzen was selected to represent Australia at the 2016 Olympic Test Event alongside Georgia-Rose Brown, Emily Little, Larrissa Miller, Kiara Munteanu, and Emily Whitehead to try and qualify Australia a team spot for the 2016 Olympic Games. The same team competed at the Pacific Rim Championships to prepare for the Test Event, and they won the bronze medal behind the United States and Canada. At the Test Event, the team finished in fifth place and did not qualify a full Olympic team. At the Australian Championships, she won the gold medal in the all-around and on the uneven bars. However, she was not selected for Australia's sole Olympic spot. She won the gold medal on the uneven bars at the Anadia World Challenge Cup.

=== 2017 ===
Mizzen won the bronze medal on the uneven bars at the Melbourne World Cup behind Chinese gymnasts Liu Tingting and Luo Huan. She then went to Montreal for the International Gymnix and placed ninth in the all-around and sixth on the floor exercise. She also won the bronze medal on the uneven bars behind Hitomi Hatakeda and Jade Chrobok. Then at the Baku World Cup, she won the silver medal on the uneven bars behind Diana Varinska. She then finished fifth on the uneven bars at the Doha World Cup. At the Australian Championships, she won the bronze medal in the all-around behind Emily Little and Georgia-Rose Brown. She also won the gold medal on the uneven bars, placed seventh on the balance beam and won the bronze medal on the floor exercise. She was selected to compete at the World Championships, but she did not qualify for any finals.

=== 2018 ===
Mizzen competed at the Melbourne World Cup and finished eighth on the uneven bars. She was selected to represent Australia at the 2018 Commonwealth Games alongside Georgia-Rose Brown, Alexandra Eade, Georgia Godwin, and Emily Whitehead. Mizzen and Godwin were both sick at the training camp immediately prior to the Games, but they recovered and were still able to compete. The team won the bronze medal behind England and Canada. At the Australian Championships, she won the bronze medal in the all-around behind Georgia Godwin and Emily Whitehead, and she won the silver medal on the uneven bars behind Godwin. Then at the Australian Classic, she won the silver medal in the all-around behind Georgia-Rose Brown and the gold medal on the uneven bars. She was initially selected to compete at the World Championships, but she tore her ACL and withdrew.

== Retirement ==
Mizzen announced her retirement from gymnastics on 16 October 2019 due to not being able to recover from her knee injury. She now works as a gymnastics coach in Brisbane.

In 2020, Mizzen spoke out against the culture at Gymnastics Australia and explained that her injury before the 2018 World Championships was a result of being overworked and the gymnasts not being listened to when they told coaches they were exhausted.

== Competitive history ==
Competitive history of Rianna Mizzen at the junior level
Year	Event	Team	AA	VT	UB	BB	FX
2013	Australian Youth Olympic Festival	3rd place, bronze medalist(s)	13				
2013	Australian Championships		6		3rd place, bronze medalist(s)		4
2014	Australian Championships		8		5		
2014	Elite Gym Massilia	10	30				

Competitive history of Rianna Mizzen at the senior level
Year	Event	Team	AA	VT	UB	BB	FX
2015	Australian Championships				1st place, gold medalist(s)		
2015	Australia vs. China Friendly	1st place, gold medalist(s)			7		
2016	Pacific Rim Championships	3rd place, bronze medalist(s)					
2016	Olympic Test Event	5					
2016	Australian Championships		1st place, gold medalist(s)		1st place, gold medalist(s)		
2016	Anadia World Cup				1st place, gold medalist(s)		
2017	Melbourne World Cup				3rd place, bronze medalist(s)		
2017	International Gymnix		9			3rd place, bronze medalist(s)	6
2017	Baku World Cup				2nd place, silver medalist(s)		
2017	Doha World Cup				5		
2017	Australian Championships		3rd place, bronze medalist(s)		1st place, gold medalist(s)	7	3rd place, bronze medalist(s)
2018	Melbourne World Cup				8		
2018	Commonwealth Games	3rd place, bronze medalist(s)					
2018	Australian Championships		3rd place, bronze medalist(s)	2nd place, silver medalist(s)			
2018	Australian Classic		2nd place, silver medalist(s)		1st place, gold medalist(s)	3rd place, bronze medalist(s)	
