= Gymnastics at the 2018 Commonwealth Games – Women's balance beam =

Women's balance beam at the 2018 Commonwealth Games
- Venue: Coomera Indoor Sports Centre
- Dates: 6 April 2018 (qualification); 9 April 2018 (final)
- Competitors: 8 from 4 nations
- Winning score: 13.700

Medalists
gold medal	Alice Kinsella	England
silver medal	Georgia-Rose Brown	Australia
bronze medal	Kelly Simm	England

The Women's balance beam competition at the 2018 Commonwealth Games took place on April 9 at the Coomera Indoor Sports Centre in Gold Coast, Australia.

== Schedule ==
The schedule is as follows:

All times are Australian Eastern Standard Time (UTC+10:00)

Date	Time	Round
Friday 6 April 2018	09:09	Qualification
Monday 9 April 2018	15:23	Final

== Results ==
=== Qualification ===
Qualification for this apparatus final was determined within the team final.

=== Final ===
The results are as follows:

Position	Gymnast	D Score	E Score	Penalty	Total
1st place, gold medalist(s)	Alice Kinsella (ENG)	5.200	8.500		13.700
2nd place, silver medalist(s)	Georgia-Rose Brown (AUS)	4.500	8.566		13.066
3rd place, bronze medalist(s)	Kelly Simm (ENG)	4.900	8.133		13.033
4	Isabela Onyshko (CAN)	5.300	7.233		12.533
5	Emily Whitehead (AUS)	4.700	7.800		12.500
6	Ellie Black (CAN)	5.400	6.966		12.366
7	Maisie Methuen (WAL)	5.000	7.266		12.266
8	Latalia Bevan (WAL)	4.800	5.900		10.700
