= Georgia-Rose Brown =

Australian artistic gymnast

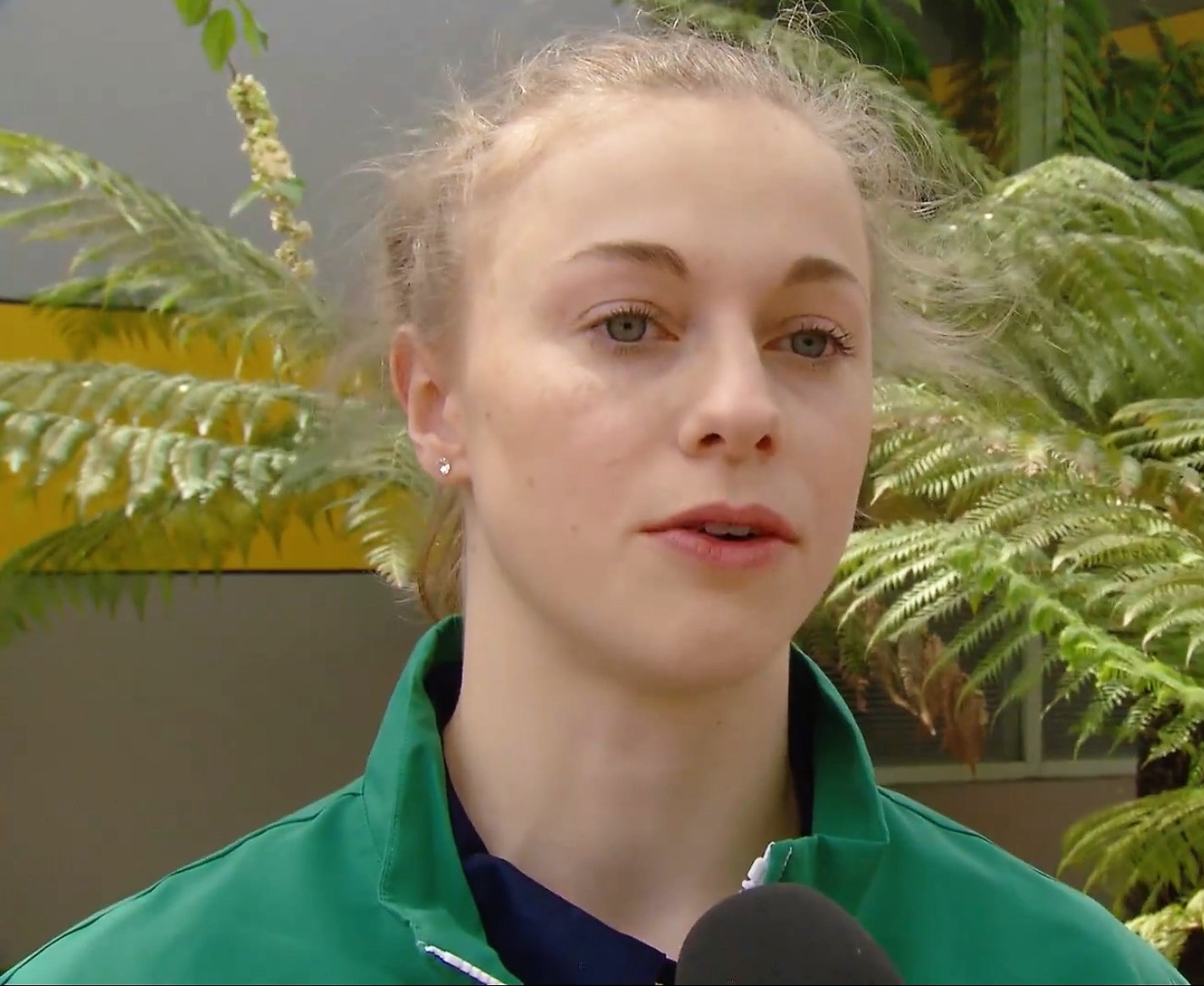
- Brown in 2018

Personal information
- Full name: Georgia-Rose Brown
- Nickname: George
- Born: 22 January 1995 (age 31) Auchenflower, Queensland, Australia
- Height: 173 cm (5 ft 8 in)

Gymnastics career
- Discipline: Women's artistic gymnastics
- Country represented: New Zealand; (2023–present)
- Former countries represented: Australia (2009–2023)
- Club: Melbourne Gymnastics Centre
- Head coach: Misha Barabach
Medal record
Representing Australia
Commonwealth Games
Silver medal – second place	2014 Glasgow	Team
Silver medal – second place	2018 Gold Coast	Balance beam
Bronze medal – third place	2018 Gold Coast	Team
Pacific Rim Championships
Bronze medal – third place	2010 Melbourne	Team
Bronze medal – third place	2014 Vancouver	Uneven bars
Bronze medal – third place	2016 Everett	Team
FIG World Cup
Event / 1st / 2nd / 3rd; Apparatus World Cup / 0 / 0 / 5

Georgia-Rose Brown (born 22 January 1995) is an Australian artistic gymnast who currently represents New Zealand in international competitions. She represented New Zealand at the 2024 Summer Olympics.

Brown represented Australia at the 2014 Commonwealth Games and helped the team win the silver medal, and at the 2018 Commonwealth Games, she won the silver medal on the balance beam and the bronze medal with the team. She competed for Australia at five World Championships and is a five-time bronze medalist in the FIG World Cup series.

== Early and personal life ==
Brown was born on 22 January 1995, in Auchenflower, Queensland. She began gymnastics when she was five years old. Her mother is a New Zealander while her father is Australian.

In 2022, Brown began a doctorate program in physiotherapy at the University of Melbourne.

== Gymnastics career ==
At the junior level, Brown finished sixth in the all-around at the 2009 Australian Championships, and she won the balance beam title. She made her international debut at the 2010 Pacific Rim Championships and won a bronze medal with the Australian team. Individually, she placed eighth in the junior all-around and fourth on the uneven bars.

=== 2011–2012 ===
Brown became age-eligible for senior competition in 2011. She made her senior international debut at the Japan Team Cup, where the Australian team finished fourth. At her first senior Australian Championships, she won the silver medal in the all-around behind Lauren Mitchell.

Brown was part of the Australian team at the 2011 World Championships in Tokyo alongside Ashleigh Brennan, Larrissa Miller, Emily Little, Lauren Mitchell, and Mary-Anne Monckton. She helped the team qualify for the 2012 Summer Olympics and competed on the uneven bars in the team final, where Australia finished eighth. After the World Championships, she competed at the Elite Gym Massilia in Marseille where she won the gold medal on the uneven bars, the silver medals in the all-around and on the vault, and the bronze medal with the Australian team.

Brown began the 2012 season at the International Gymnix and won a bronze medal on the uneven bars. At the Australian Championships, she finished fourth in the all-around, and she won the bronze medal on the uneven bars behind Olivia Vivian and Mary-Anne Monckton. She was chosen as an alternate for Australia's 2012 Olympic team.

=== 2013–2014 ===
Brown competed at the 2013 Australian Championships and won the silver medal on the uneven bars behind Olivia Vivian. She also placed fifth in the all-around and on the floor exercise.

Brown began the 2014 season at the Nadia Comaneci Invitational where she finished third in the all-around behind teammate Georgia Godwin and Venezuela's Jessica López. She then competed at the City of Jesolo Trophy and helped the Australian team place fourth. Brown qualified for the uneven bars final and placed fifth. Her next competition was the Pacific Rim Championships where she won a bronze medal on the uneven bars behind Americans Elizabeth Price and Kyla Ross.

Brown was selected to represent Australia at the 2014 Commonwealth Games alongside Larrissa Miller, Lauren Mitchell, Mary-Anne Monckton, and Olivia Vivian. The team won the silver medal behind England. Individually, Brown finished 13th in the all-around, seventh on the vault, and fifth on the uneven bars. She then competed at the 2014 World Championships alongside Miller, Monckton, Vivian, Kiara Munteanu, and Emma Nedov. She competed on all four events in the team final and helped Australia place seventh. Invidiaully, she qualified for the all-around final where she finished 21st.

=== 2015–2016 ===
Brown represented Australia at the 2015 Summer Universiade, and she finished sixth in the uneven bars final. She then competed at a friendly meet against China and won a gold medal on the uneven bars. She was the alternate for the 2015 World Championships team.

Brown began the 2016 season at the Pacific Rim Championships where she helped Australia win the bronze medal behind the United States and Canada. Individually, she finished eighth in the all-around and fifth on the floor exercise. Then at the Olympic Test Event, she finished fifth with the Australian team. This meant Australia did not qualify as a team for the 2016 Olympic Games. At the Australian Championships, she won the silver medal in the all-around behind Rianna Mizzen. She was not selected for Australia's sole Olympic spot. Her final meet of the year was the Toyota International where she finished sixth on the uneven bars and balance beam and fifth on the floor exercise.

=== 2017–2018 ===
Brown placed fourth on the uneven bars at the 2017 Melbourne World Cup. She then won bronze medals on the uneven bars at the Baku and Doha World Cups. She finished second in the all-around to Emma Little at the Australian Championships. In the event finals, she won the balance beam and floor exercise titles, and she placed fourth on the uneven bars. She missed the rest of the season due to a variety of injuries.

Brown returned to competition and won a bronze medal on the uneven bars at the 2018 Melbourne World Cup. She was selected to represent Australia at the 2018 Commonwealth Games alongside Alexandra Eade, Georgia Godwin, Rianna Mizzen, Emily Whitehead. The team won the bronze medal behind Canada and England. Individually, Brown placed fourth in the all-around final, only 0.150 away from the bronze medal. She also placed fourth in the uneven bars final, and she won the silver medal on the balance beam behind England's Alice Kinsella. She then won the all-around title at the Australian Classic and also won silver medals on the uneven bars and balance beam. She was selected to compete at the 2018 World Championships, and the Australian team placed 15th in the qualification round.

=== 2019 ===
At the 2019 Melbourne World Cup, Brown won a bronze medal on the uneven bars. She won another uneven bars bronze medal at the Baku World Cup. Then at the Australian Championships, she won the silver medal in the all-around behind Georgia Godwin. She won the uneven bars title and won silver medals on the balance beam and floor exercise. She then helped Australia win the silver medal behind Italy at the FIT Challenge. At the Australian Classic, she won a bronze medal in the all-around behind Godwin and Kate McDonald.

Brown was selected to compete at the World Championships in Stuttgart alongside Godwin, McDonald, Emma Nedov, and Talia Folino. The team placed 13th in the qualification round, meaning they once again missed qualifying as a full team for the Olympic Games. After the World Championships, she competed at the Toyota International where she placed fifth on the uneven bars, balance beam, and floor exercise.

=== 2020–2022 ===
Brown placed fourth on the uneven bars at the 2020 Melbourne World Cup. During the qualification round of the Baku World Cup, she finished fifth on the uneven bars and seventh on the floor exercise. The event finals in Baku were canceled due to the COVID-19 pandemic.

Brown returned to competition at the 2021 Oceanic Championships to earn a continental quota berth for the postponed 2020 Olympic Games. She ultimately lost the Olympic berth to Emily Whitehead by 0.350. She was selected to compete at the 2022 World Championships alongside Romi Brown, Georgia Godwin, Kate McDonald, and Breanna Scott, and they finished tenth in the qualification round.

=== 2023–2024 ===
At the 2023 Doha World Cup, Brown finished fifth on the uneven bars, and she finished fourth on the uneven bars at the Baku World Cup. She finished fifth in the all-around at the 2023 Australian Championships.

In November 2023, Brown's request to represent New Zealand in international competitions was accepted by the International Gymnastics Federation. The International Olympic Committee approved the nationality change for the Olympic Games in January 2024. She registered for the 2024 FIG World Cup series to compete on the uneven bars for an Olympic berth. With a fourth-place finish in Cairo and fifth-place finishes in Cottbus and Doha, she earned enough Olympic qualification points to secure an Olympic quota. Her Olympic qualification was confirmed in May by the New Zealand Olympic Committee.

== Competitive history ==
Competitive history of Georgia-Rose Brown representing Australia
Year	Event	Team	AA	VT	UB	BB	FX
2009	Australian Championships		6	6	2nd place, silver medalist(s)	1st place, gold medalist(s)	3rd place, bronze medalist(s)
2010	Pacific Rim Championships	3rd place, bronze medalist(s)	8		4		
2010	Australian Championships	1st place, gold medalist(s)					
2011	Japan Team Cup	4					
2011	Australian Championships	1st place, gold medalist(s)	2nd place, silver medalist(s)	8	5	4	
2011	World Championships	8					
2011	Elite Gym Massilia	3rd place, bronze medalist(s)	2nd place, silver medalist(s)	2nd place, silver medalist(s)	1st place, gold medalist(s)		
2012	International Gymnix		6	7	3rd place, bronze medalist(s)		
2012	Australian Championships	1st place, gold medalist(s)	4	5	3rd place, bronze medalist(s)		4
2012	Mexican Cup		4		2nd place, silver medalist(s)	2nd place, silver medalist(s)	
2013	Australian Championships	1st place, gold medalist(s)	5		2nd place, silver medalist(s)		5
2014	Nadia Comaneci Invitational	1st place, gold medalist(s)	3rd place, bronze medalist(s)				
2014	City of Jesolo Trophy	4	22		5		
2014	Pacific Rim Championships	5	6		3rd place, bronze medalist(s)	8	
2014	Australian Championships	1st place, gold medalist(s)					
2014	Commonwealth Games	2nd place, silver medalist(s)	13	7	5		
2014	World Championships	7	21				
2015	Summer Universiade	5			6		
2015	Australia vs China Friendly	1st place, gold medalist(s)	4		1st place, gold medalist(s)	6	
2016	Pacific Rim Championships	3rd place, bronze medalist(s)	8				5
2016	Olympic Test Event	5					
2016	Australian Championships	3rd place, bronze medalist(s)	2nd place, silver medalist(s)		5	5	4
2016	Toyota International				6	6	5
2017	Melbourne World Cup				4		
2017	Baku World Cup				3rd place, bronze medalist(s)		
2017	Doha World Cup				3rd place, bronze medalist(s)		
2017	Australian Championships	1st place, gold medalist(s)	2nd place, silver medalist(s)		4	1st place, gold medalist(s)	1st place, gold medalist(s)
2018	Melbourne World Cup				3rd place, bronze medalist(s)		
2018	Commonwealth Games	3rd place, bronze medalist(s)	4		4	2nd place, silver medalist(s)	5
2018	Australian Classic		1st place, gold medalist(s)		2nd place, silver medalist(s)	2nd place, silver medalist(s)	3rd place, bronze medalist(s)
2018	World Championships	15					
2019	Melbourne World Cup				3rd place, bronze medalist(s)		
2019	Baku World Cup				3rd place, bronze medalist(s)		
2019	Australian Championships		2nd place, silver medalist(s)		1st place, gold medalist(s)	2nd place, silver medalist(s)	2nd place, silver medalist(s)
2019	FIT Challenge	2nd place, silver medalist(s)	12				
2019	Australian Classic		3rd place, bronze medalist(s)	3rd place, bronze medalist(s)	3rd place, bronze medalist(s)		2nd place, silver medalist(s)
2019	World Championships	13					
2019	Toyota International				5	5	5
2020	Melbourne World Cup				4		
2020	Baku World Cup				5		7
2021	Oceanic Championships		2nd place, silver medalist(s)				
2022
2022	World Championships	10					
2023	Doha World Cup				5		
2023	Baku World Cup				4		
2023	Australian Championships		5				

Competitive history of Georgia-Rose Brown representing New Zealand
Year	Event	Team	AA	VT	UB	BB	FX
2024	Cairo World Cup				4		
2024	Cottbus World Cup				5		
2024	Doha World Cup				5		
2024	Olympic Games		R4				
2025
2025	World Championships				50	44	

== See also ==
- Nationality changes in gymnastics
