= Gymnastics at the 2018 Commonwealth Games – Women's floor =

Women's floor at the 2018 Commonwealth Games
- Venue: Coomera Indoor Sports Centre
- Dates: 6 April 2018 (qualification); 9 April 2018 (final)
- Competitors: 8 from 4 nations
- Winning Score: 13.333

Medalists
| gold medal | Alexandra Eade | Australia |
| silver medal | Latalia Bevan | Wales |
| bronze medal | Shallon Olsen | Canada |

The Women's floor gymnastics competition at the 2018 Commonwealth Games in Gold Coast, Australia was held on 8 April 2018 at the Coomera Indoor Sports Centre.

== Schedule ==
The schedule is as follows:

All times are Australian Eastern Standard Time (UTC+10:00)

| Date | Time | Round |
|---|---|---|
| Friday 6 April 2018 | 09:09 | Qualification |
| Monday 9 April 2018 | 16:46 | Final |

== Results ==
=== Qualification ===
Qualification for this apparatus final was determined within the team final.

=== Final ===
The results are as follows:

| Rank | Gymnast | Difficulty | Execution | Penalty | Total |
|---|---|---|---|---|---|
| 1st place, gold medalist(s) | Alexandra Eade (AUS) | 5.100 | 8.233 | | 13.333 |
| 2nd place, silver medalist(s) | Latalia Bevan (WAL) | 4.800 | 8.500 | | 13.300 |
| 3rd place, bronze medalist(s) | Shallon Olsen (CAN) | 5.500 | 7.766 | | 13.266 |
| 4 | Ellie Black (CAN) | 4.700 | 8.500 | | 13.200 |
| 5 | Georgia Rose Brown (AUS) | 4.500 | 8.600 | | 13.100 |
| 6 | Emily Thomas (WAL) | 5.100 | 7.766 | | 12.866 |
| 7 | Taeja James (ENG) | 5.400 | 7.666 | 0.400 | 12.666 |
| 8 | Alice Kinsella (ENG) | 4.900 | 7.066 | 0.300 | 11.666 |
