= Raegan Rutty =

Caymanian artistic gymnast

- Full name: Raegan Amelia Rutty
- Born: 14 January 2002 (age 24) Cayman Islands
- Height: 5 ft 8 in (173 cm)

Gymnastics career
- Discipline: Women's artistic gymnastics
- Country represented: Cayman Islands; (2016–2021)
- Head coach: Eddie Umphrey
- Assistant coach: Johnnie Umphrey
- Education: University of Florida (2024)

Raegan Rutty
- Beauty pageant titleholder
- Title: Miss Cayman Islands 2024
- Hair color: Brown
- Eye color: Brown
- Major competitions: Miss Cayman Islands 2024 (Winner); Miss Universe 2024 (Unplaced)

Raegan Rutty OLY (born 14 January 2002) is a Caymanian beauty pageant titleholder and former artistic gymnast. She represented the Cayman Islands at the 2020 Olympic Games, the 2018 Commonwealth Games, the 2019 Pan American Games, and the 2018 and 2019 World Championships. She was the Cayman Islands' first ever Olympic gymnast. She won Miss Cayman Islands 2024 and represented her country at the 2024 Miss Universe on 16 November 2024.

== Early and personal life ==
Rutty was born in the Cayman Islands in 2002 to Angel, a Houston, Texas native, and Gary Rutty, the son of former Cabinet Minister Burns Rutty and grandson of Aston Rutty, a Senior Government Officer in Cayman Brac during the 1930s.

Rutty is a ninth-generation Caymanian. She began gymnastics when she was four years old because her older sister, Hannah, was also in the sport. In addition to gymnastics she is an avid fisherwoman, specializing in catching wahoo.

At 15 Rutty left the Cayman Islands to train in Houston, Texas and lived with a host family. After the 2020 Olympic Games, Rutty enrolled at the University of Florida where she studied psychology. When her reign as Miss Cayman Islands ended, Rutty began a broadcasting career at Compass TV.

== Gymnastics career ==
=== Junior: 2016–2017 ===
Rutty made her international debut at the 2016 Pan American Championships. She finished 26th in the all-around. She next competed at the Junior Commonwealth Games where she finished 16th in the all-around.

In 2017 Rutty competed at the Central American Sports Festival where she placed 16th.

=== Senior: 2018–2021 ===
Rutty became age-eligible for senior level competition in 2018. She made her senior debut at the 2018 Commonwealth Games. During qualifications she placed 30th in the all-around and did not qualify for the final. Rutty next competed at the Central American and Caribbean Games. She only competed on the uneven bars due to sustaining an injury during warm-ups. She next competed at the Pan American Championships where she finished 40th in the all-around.

Rutty was selected to represent the Cayman Islands at the 2018 World Championships in Doha. During qualifications she finished 137th in the all-around; she did not qualify for any event finals, but was the highest ranking for a Caymanian gymnast.

Rutty competed at the 2019 Pan American Games where she finished 38th during qualifications. Rutty was selected to represent the Cayman Islands at the 2019 World Championships in Stuttgart. During qualifications she finished 158th in the all-around and did not qualify for the finals, nor did she qualify as an individual to the 2020 Olympic Games. However, Rutty was eligible to earn an Olympic berth via the tripartite invitation, which is selected closer to start of the Olympic Games.

Rutty competed at the 2021 Pan American Championships in June. While there she finished 35th in the all-around. On June 28, 2021 Rutty officially received the Tripartite Invitation, an Olympic berth allocated to countries with less than eight athletes in individual sports or disciplines at the last two editions of the Olympic Games, to compete at the 2020 Summer Olympics. She became the first Caymanian Olympic gymnast and was the third Caymanian athlete qualified to the Tokyo Olympics after sprinter Kemar Hyman and swimmer Brett Fraser. Rutty was later joined by athlete Shalysa Wray and swimmer Jillian Crooks who also received tripartite invitations in their respective sports. At the Olympic Games Rutty finished 80th in qualification and did not advance to any event finals.

== Pageantry ==
In 2024, Rutty competed in Miss Cayman Islands 2024, where she won the title of Miss Universe Cayman Islands and represented Cayman Islands in Miss Universe 2024. Although she was unplaced in competition, she was a silver finalist in the Voice for Change contest in which delegates use their voices to promote social change. For her entry in this contest Rutty highlighted mental health and suicide awareness, focusing on breaking the stigma surrounding the issues, and creating a supportive space for conversations that matter.

== Competitive history ==
Competitive history of Raegan Rutty
| Year | Event | Team | AA | VT | UB | BB | FX |
2016
| 2016 | Junior Pan American Championships | | 26 | | | | |
| 2016 | Junior Commonwealth Games | | 16 | | | | |
| 2017 | Central American Sports Festival | | 16 | | | | |
2018
| 2018 | Commonwealth Games | | 30 | | | | |
| 2018 | Pan American Championships | | 40 | | 48 | 61 | 46 |
2019
| 2019 | Pan American Games | | 38 | | | | |
2021
| 2021 | Pan American Championships | | 35 | | | | |
| 2021 | Olympic Games | | 80 | | | | |

Awards and achievements
| Preceded by Ileann Powery | Miss Cayman Islands; 2024 | Succeeded by Tahiti Seymour |
