= Latalia Bevan =

Welsh artistic gymnast (born 2001)

- Full name: Latalia Rene Bevan
- Born: 26 January 2001 (age 25) Merthyr Tydfil, Wales
- Height: 157 cm (5 ft 2 in)

Gymnastics career
- Country represented: Great Britain; Wales
Medal record
Gymnastics
Representing Wales
Commonwealth Games
| Silver medal – second place | 2018 Gold Coast | Floor exercise |
Northern European Championships
| Gold medal – first place | 2014 Greve | Team |
| Gold medal – first place | 2014 Greve | Balance beam |
| Gold medal – first place | 2015 Limerick | Team |
| Gold medal – first place | 2015 Limerick | All-around |
| Gold medal – first place | 2015 Limerick | Balance beam |
| Gold medal – first place | 2015 Limerick | Floor exercise |

Latalia Rene Bevan (born 26 January 2001) is a Welsh retired artistic gymnast. She won a silver medal on the floor exercise at the 2018 Commonwealth Games. She is a six-time Northern European Championships gold medalist.

== Early life ==
Bevan was born on 26 January 2001 in Merthyr Tydfil. She began gymnastics when she was six years old. She attended Whitchurch High School in Cardiff.

== Gymnastics career ==
Bevan won the junior all-around title at the 2014 Welsh Championships. She finished 19th in the all-around at the 2014 International Gymnix and qualified for the balance beam final, where she finished sixth. She then helped the Welsh team win the gold medal at the 2014 Northern European Championships and also won the balance beam gold medal.

Bevan won the silver medal in the junior all-around at the 2015 Welsh Championships behind Maisie Methuen. She participated in the 2015 Northern European Championships, winning gold medals in the team, individual all-around, balance beam, and floor exercise. She won the all-around title at the 2016 UK School Games and helped Wales win the team event. She then helped Wales win the team event at the 2016 Junior Commonwealth Championships, and she also won the silver medal on the uneven bars.

At the 2017 British Championships, Bevan won a silver medal on the balance beam She won the all-around title at the 2018 Welsh Championships. She then placed ninth in the all-around at the 2018 British Championships.

Bevan was selected to represent Wales at the 2018 Commonwealth Games. The Welsh team finished fourth in the team competition. Individually, Bevan qualified for the all-around final and finished sixth. She then finished eighth in both the uneven bars and balance beam finals. Then in the floor exercise final, she won the silver medal by only 0.033 behind Australia's Alexandra Eade.

After the Commonwealth Games, Bevan tore her Achilles tendon. By the time she was ready to return to competition, the COVID-19 pandemic had canceled all competitions. She ultimately decided to retire in January 2021.
