= 2016 Pacific Rim Gymnastics Championships =

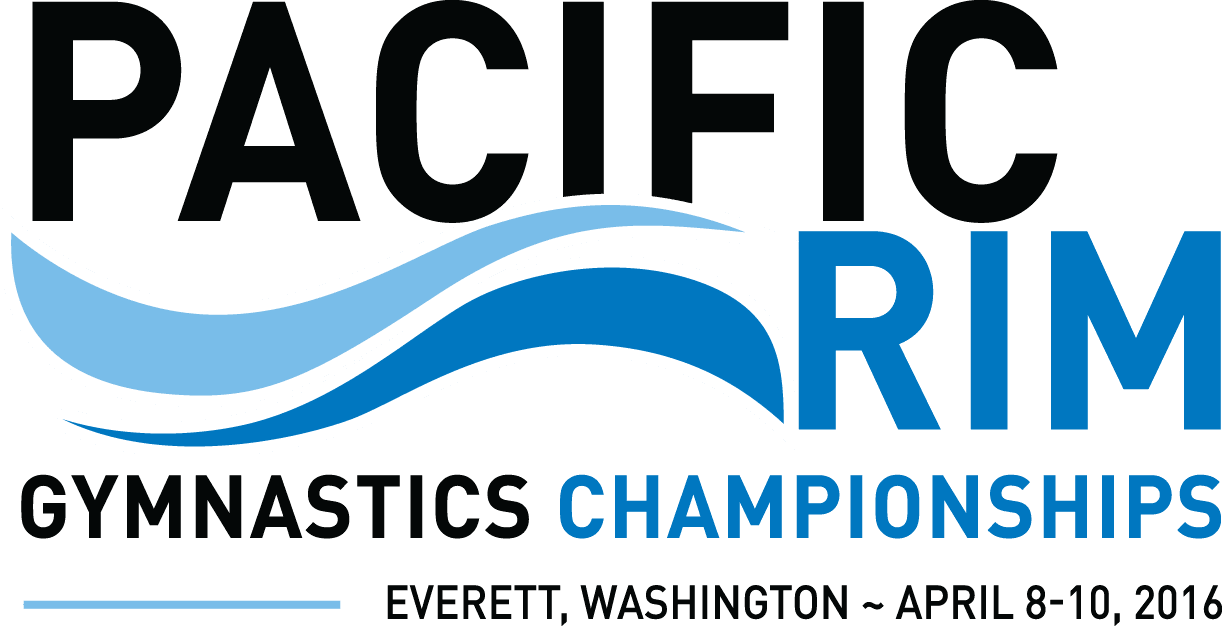
- The official logo for the event
- Venues: Xfinity Arena (ART & TRA events); Everett Community College (RHY events)
- Location: Everett, Washington, United States
- Dates: April 8–10, 2016
- Competitors: at least 300 (projected)

The 2016 Pacific Rim Gymnastics Championships is the fifteenth edition of the Pacific Rim Gymnastics Championships. The competition was held April 8–10, 2016 at the Xfinity Arena (for artistic and trampoline events) and the Everett Community College (for rhythmic events) – both of which are in Everett, Washington. The 2016 event marks the fifth time that the Championships have been held in the United States, and the second time in Everett (the first being 2012).

The event served as the second international team elite competition for the U.S. women's national team (after the City of Jesolo Trophy) and the first for the men's team.

== Background ==
On March 17, 2015, American national gymnastics governing body USA Gymnastics announced that Everett had been selected to host the Championships for the 2016 edition – a result of the successful event in 2012. USA Gymnastics president Steve Penny said the 2012 championships were "the best Pacific Rim gymnastics event we've [USA Gymnastics] ever held". The 2012 event drew an attendance of 20,343 over three days competition; more than four times higher than the previous 2008 event in San Jose, California. The 2012 event amassed a profit of around $2.5 million.

== Promotion ==
In February 2016, Olympians Carly Patterson and Shawn Johnson visited the Seattle metropolitan area to promote the event at a sports award ceremony.

== Venues ==
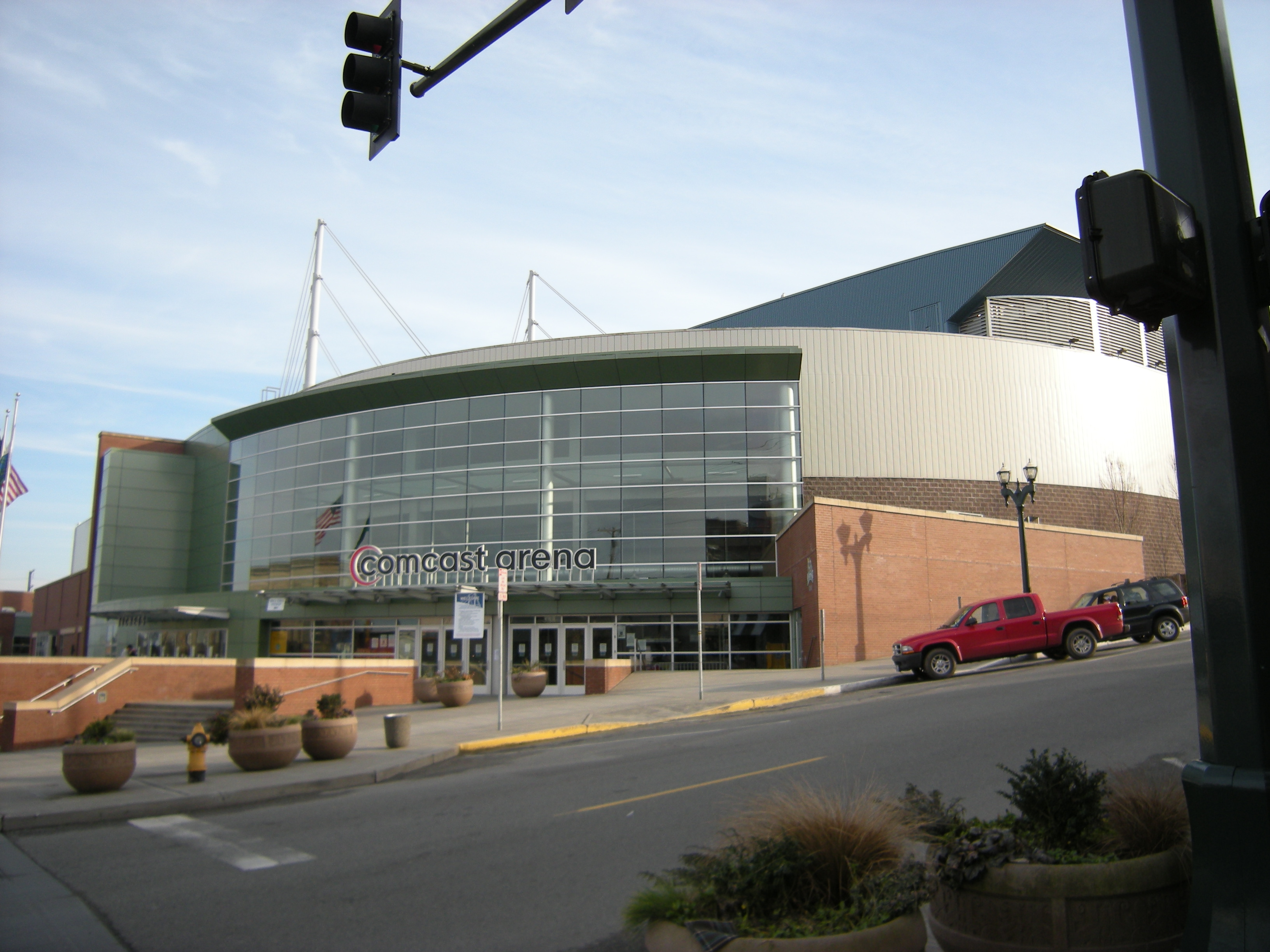
The Xfinity Arena in 2009, when it was named the Comcast Arena

Opened on September 27, 2003, as the Everett Events Center, the arena is home to the WHL hockey team Everett Silvertips and the Tilted Thunder Rail Birds roller derby team. Additionally, the arena hosted the 2008 Skate America and several other sporting and exhibition events. The arena had a capacity of 6,200 for the 2012 event but some arena floor area was used to cater for additional seating.

Unlike the 2012 event where all events were contested at the Xfinity Arena, the organizers have decided to use nearby Everett Community College to host the rhythmic gymnastics events. Although it hasn't been confirmed, it is thought that the events will take place in the Gray Wolf Hall. The college's athletic mascot is a Trojan and the hall hosts volleyball matches.

== Broadcast ==
NBC Sports televised the event. The women's team and all-around competitions were aired through tape-delayed coverage on NBC.

Additionally, 2008 Olympians Samantha Peszek and Jonathan Horton, along with Evan Heiter, presented live YouTube coverage of the competition.

== Participating nations ==
The following nations participated in the competition:

- Australia
- Canada
- China
- Chinese Taipei
- Colombia
- Costa Rica
- Ecuador
- Honduras
- Hong Kong
- Japan
- Mexico
- New Zealand
- Philippines
- Singapore
- United States

== Medalists ==
=== Artistic gymnastics ===
==== Men's events ====
Event	Gold	Silver	Bronze
Team	United States; Jacob Dalton; Eddie Penev; Alex Naddour; Sam Mikulak; Donnell Whittenburg; John Orozco	China; Mu Jile; Gu Baisen; Cai Weifeng; Wang Peng; Zou Jingyuan; Wu Xiaoming	Canada; Damien Cachia; Joel Gagnon; Aaron Mah; Justin Karstadt; Scott Nabata; Anthony Tawfik
Seniors
All-Around	(China) Cai Weifeng	(United States) Donnell Whittenburg	(United States) Sam Mikulak
Floor	(United States) Jacob Dalton	(United States) Eddie Penev	(Canada) Aaron Mah
Pommel Horse	(United States) Alex Naddour	(United States) Sam Mikulak	(China) Wu Xiaoming
Rings	(United States) Donnell Whittenburg	(United States) John Orozco	(China) Cai Weifeng
Vault	(United States) Eddie Penev	(United States) Donnell Whittenburg	(Japan) Yurjiro Terachi
Horizontal Bar	(United States) John Orozco	(Japan) Naoki Yamane	(Colombia) Carlos Calvo
Parallel Bars	(United States) Donnell Whittenburg	(China) Cai Weifeng	(Colombia) Javier Sandoval
Juniors
All-Around	(Japan) Ryuto Sako	(Japan) Kosuke Wakasa	(Philippines) Carlos Edriel Yulo
Floor	(Philippines) Carlos Edriel Yulo	(Japan) Ryosuke Doi	(Colombia) José David Toro
Pommel Horse	(Japan) Kosuke Wakasa	(Chinese Taipei) Alan Shiao	(Colombia) José Martínez
Rings	(Japan) Kanta Amano	(Philippines) Carlos Edriel Yulo	(Japan) Ryuto Sako (Canada) Anthony Tawfik
Vault	(Philippines) Carlos Edriel Yulo	(Chinese Taipei) Alan Shiao	(Japan) Kanta Amano
Horizontal Bar	(Japan) Ryuto Sako	(Japan) Kanta Amano	(Canada) Anthony Tawfik
Parallel Bars	(Japan) Kosuke Wakasa	(Philippines) Carlos Edriel Yulo	(Chinese Taipei) Shih Yen Fang (Japan) Ryuto Sako

==== Women's events ====
Event	Gold	Silver	Bronze
Team	United States; Simone Biles; Aly Raisman; Brenna Dowell; Laurie Hernandez; Ashton Locklear; Ragan Smith	Canada; Brittany Rogers; Shallon Olsen; Kirsten Peterman; Madison Copiak; Megan Roberts; Audrey Rousseau	Australia; Emily Little; Georgia-Rose Brown; Emma Nedov; Rianna Mizzen; Kiara Munteanu; Larrissa Miller
Seniors
All-Around	(United States) Simone Biles	(United States) Aly Raisman	(Japan) Nagi Kajita
Vault	(Canada) Shallon Olsen	(Canada) Brittany Rogers	(New Zealand) Courtney McGregor
Uneven Bars	(United States) Ashton Locklear	(Australia) Larrissa Miller	(Canada) Brittany Rogers
Balance Beam	(United States) Ragan Smith	(United States) Aly Raisman	(Japan) Nagi Kajita
Floor	(United States) Aly Raisman	(United States) Brenna Dowell	(Canada) Shallon Olsen
Juniors
All-Around	(Japan) Kiko Kuwajima	(Japan) Natsumi Hanashima	(Mexico) Louise Lopez
Vault	(Japan) Kiko Kuwajima	(Chinese Taipei) Ko Ching Fang	(New Zealand) Stella Ashcroft
Uneven Bars	(Japan) Natsumi Hanashima	(Mexico) Jimena Moreno	(Colombia) Paula Arevalo (Japan) Kiko Kuwajima
Balance Beam	(Japan) Kiko Kuwajima	(Mexico) Jimena Moreno	(Mexico) Louise Lopez
Floor	(Japan) Kiko Kuwajima	(Mexico) Louise Lopez	(Japan) Mana Oguchi

=== Rhythmic gymnastics ===
Event	Gold	Silver	Bronze
Team	United States; Aliya Protto; Camilla Feeley; Brigita Budginas; Nicole Kaloyanov; Heather Chan; Lili Mizuno	Canada; Katherine Uchida; Natali Nikolova; Cindy Huh; Sophie Crane; Natalie Garcia; Alexandra Chtrevenskii	China; Yili Wang; Zhangjiayang Huang; Doudou Zhang; Ran Yu; Yating Zhao; Yajing Liu
Seniors
All-Around	United States; Aliya Protto	United States; Camilla Feeley	Canada; Katherine Uchida
Hoop	United States; Aliya Protto	United States; Camilla Feeley	China; Yili Wang
Ball	United States; Aliya Protto	United States; Camilla Feeley	Australia; Danielle Prince
Clubs	United States; Aliya Protto	United States; Brigita Budginas	Australia; Danielle Prince
Ribbon	United States; Camilla Feeley	United States; Aliya Protto	Australia; Danielle Prince
Juniors
All-Around	United States; Lili Mizuno	Canada; Alexandra Chtrevenskii	China; Zhao Yating
Hoop	United States; Lili Mizuno	Australia; Alexandra Eedle	Canada; Alexandra Chtrevenskii
Ball	United States; Lili Mizuno	China; Zhao Yating	Canada; Alexandra Chtrevenskii
Clubs	United States; Lili Mizuno	China; Zhao Yating	Australia; Lidiia Iakovleva
Ribbon	United States; Lili Mizuno	Canada; Natalie Garcia	Canada; Alexandra Chtrevenskii

== Women's results ==
=== Team final ===
Rank	Team	Vault (gymnastics)	Uneven bars	Balance beam	Floor (gymnastics)	Total
1st place, gold medalist(s)	United States	60.750 (1)	60.650 (1)	60.650 (1)	61.150 (1)	243.200
1st place, gold medalist(s)	Simone Biles	15.800	15.050	15.550	16.050	243.200
1st place, gold medalist(s)	Aly Raisman	15.200		14.800	15.600	243.200
1st place, gold medalist(s)	Brenna Dowell	14.950	15.250		14.550	243.200
1st place, gold medalist(s)	Laurie Hernandez	14.800	14.800	15.250	14.950	243.200
1st place, gold medalist(s)	Ashton Locklear		15.550			243.200
1st place, gold medalist(s)	Ragan Smith			15.050		243.200
2nd place, silver medalist(s)	Canada	57.900 (2)	53.200 (2)	53.200 (3)	54.800 (2)	219.100
2nd place, silver medalist(s)	Brittany Rogers	14.850	13.500			219.100
2nd place, silver medalist(s)	Shallon Olsen	14.750	12.800	13.400	13.950	219.100
2nd place, silver medalist(s)	Kirsten Peterman	14.200	13.100		13.600	219.100
2nd place, silver medalist(s)	Madison Copiak	14.100	13.800	13.350	13.250	219.100
2nd place, silver medalist(s)	Megan Roberts			13.700	14.000	219.100
2nd place, silver medalist(s)	Audrey Rousseau			12.750		219.100
3rd place, bronze medalist(s)	Australia	56.900 (4)	52.700 (3)	54.350 (2)	53.900 (4)	217.850
3rd place, bronze medalist(s)	Emily Little	14.700		14.150	13.850	217.850
3rd place, bronze medalist(s)	Georgia Rose Brown	14.100		13.350	13.550	217.850
3rd place, bronze medalist(s)	Emma Nedov	14.100	12.650	13.400		217.850
3rd place, bronze medalist(s)	Rianna Mizzen	14.000	13.000			217.850
3rd place, bronze medalist(s)	Kiara Munteanu		13.650	13.450	13.200	217.850
3rd place, bronze medalist(s)	Larrissa Miller		13.400		13.300	217.850
4	Japan	57.750 (3)	52.500 (4)	52.950 (4)	54.500 (3)	217.700
4	Kiko Kuwajima	15.050	12.600	13.400	13.500	217.700
4	Mana Oguchi	14.300		12.900	13.800	217.700
4	Nagi Kajita	14.250	13.650	13.400	13.900	217.700
4	Soyoka Hanawa	14.150	12.400	13.250		217.700
4	Natsumi Hanashima		13.850		13.300	217.700
5	New Zealand	55.650 (5)	42.650 (9)	52.700 (5)	52.700 (5)	203.700
5	Courtney McGregor	14.300	12.350	13.450	13.450	203.700
5	Mackenzie Slee	14.050	8.250	12.550		203.700
5	Charlotte Sullivan	13.800	11.550	13.500	13.250	203.700
5	Stella Ashcroft	13.500		13.200	13.450	203.700
5	Estella Mathewson		10.500		12.550	203.700
6	Mexico	52.450 (7)	43.750 (7)	46.800 (8)	51.800 (6)	194.800
6	Mariana Vázquez	13.700		11.600		194.800
6	Louise López	13.250	11.300	13.300	13.600	194.800
6	Karen Lozano	12.850	10.950		12.250	194.800
6	Cassandra Loustalot	12.650	9.300	9.850	12.900	194.800
6	Jimena Moreno		12.200	12.050	13.050	194.800
7	Singapore	52.600 (6)	44.500 (5)	48.600 (6)	48.700 (8)	194.400
7	Sze En Tan	13.550	11.550	12.500	12.950	194.400
7	Nadine Joy Nathan	13.300	10.900	12.150	12.300	194.400
7	Janessa Min Yi Dai	13.150			12.950	194.400
7	Zeng Qiyan	12.600	10.550	11.950	10.500	194.400
7	Colette Chan		11.500	12.000		194.400
8	Colombia	51.000 (9)	44.500 (5)	48.400 (7)	48.950 (7)	192.850
8	Ginna Escobar	13.400	13.150	12.800	12.800	192.850
8	Dayana Ardila	12.600	10.400	12.500	12.200	192.850
8	Angie Rodríguez	12.600	10.100	11.900	12.050	192.850
8	María Villegas	12.400			11.900	192.850
8	Paula Arevalo		10.850	11.200		192.850
9	Costa Rica	51.900 (8)	43.600 (8)	44.700 (9)	47.350 (9)	187.550
9	Heika Del Sol Salas	13.150	11.900	12.400	12.650	187.550
9	Francini Morales	13.050	10.050	10.800	11.600	187.550
9	Luciana Alvarado	13.000	12.000	10.550	10.850	187.550
9	Camila Montoya	12.700	9.650	10.950	12.250	187.550
10	Hong Kong	50.700 (10)	31.150 (10)	39.350 (10)	45.850 (10)	167.050
10	Cheuk Lam Chan	13.150		9.400	12.750	167.050
10	Sau Chung Cristal Kwan	12.950	6.300	10.300	11.300	167.050
10	Tsz Sum Elizabeth Chan	12.650	7.650	10.500	10.800	167.050
10	Ho Yat Cheung	11.950	8.050	9.150	11.000	167.050
10	Nim Yan Choi		9.150			167.050

=== Individual All-around ===
Rank	Gymnast	Vault (gymnastics)	Uneven bars	Balance beam	Floor (gymnastics)	Total
1st place, gold medalist(s)	Simone Biles (USA)	15.800	15.050	15.550	16.050	62.450
2nd place, silver medalist(s)	Aly Raisman (USA)	15.200	14.300	14.800	15.600	59.900
3rd place, bronze medalist(s)	Nagi Kajita (JPN)	14.250	13.650	13.400	13.900	55.200
4	Shallon Olsen (CAN)	14.750	12.800	13.400	13.950	54.900
5	Madison Copiak (CAN)	14.100	13.800	13.350	13.250	54.500
6	Kiara Munteanu (AUS)	13.850	13.650	13.450	13.200	54.150
7	Courtney McGregor (NZL)	14.300	12.350	13.450	13.450	53.550
8	Georgia-Rose Brown (AUS)	14.100	11.400	13.350	13.550	52.400
9	Ginna Escobar (COL)	13.400	13.150	12.800	12.800	52.150
10	Charlotte Sullivan (NZL)	13.800	11.550	13.500	13.250	52.100
11	Sze En Tan (SIN)	13.550	11.550	12.500	12.950	50.550
12	Heika del Sol Salas (CRC)	13.150	11.900	12.400	12.650	50.100
13	Melany Cabrera (CHI)	12.850	11.700	12.400	12.500	49.450
14	Nadine Joy Nathan (SIN)	13.300	10.900	12.150	12.300	48.650
15	Dayana Ardila (COL)	12.600	10.400	12.500	12.200	47.700
16	Valentina Brostella (PAN)	12.850	9.000	11.350	12.400	45.600
17	Cassandra Loustalot (MEX)	12.650	9.300	9.850	12.900	44.700
18	Mariana Vazquez (MEX)	13.700	9.150	11.600	10.000	44.450
19	Tsz Sum Elizabeth Chan (HKG)	12.650	7.650	10.500	10.800	51.198
20	Sau Chung Cristal Kwan (HKG)	12.950	6.300	10.300	11.300	40.850
21	Giulianna Pino (ECU)			12.250		12.250

== Medal table ==
Rank	Nation	Gold	Silver	Bronze	Total
1	United States	23	13	1	37
2	Japan	10	5	8	23
3	Philippines	2	2	1	5
4	Canada	1	5	10	16
5	China	1	4	5	10
6	Mexico	0	3	2	5
7	Chinese Taipei	0	3	1	4
8	Australia	0	2	5	7
9	Colombia	0	0	5	5
10	New Zealand	0	0	2	2
Totals (10 entries)		37	37	40	114
