= Talia Folino =

Australian artistic gymnast

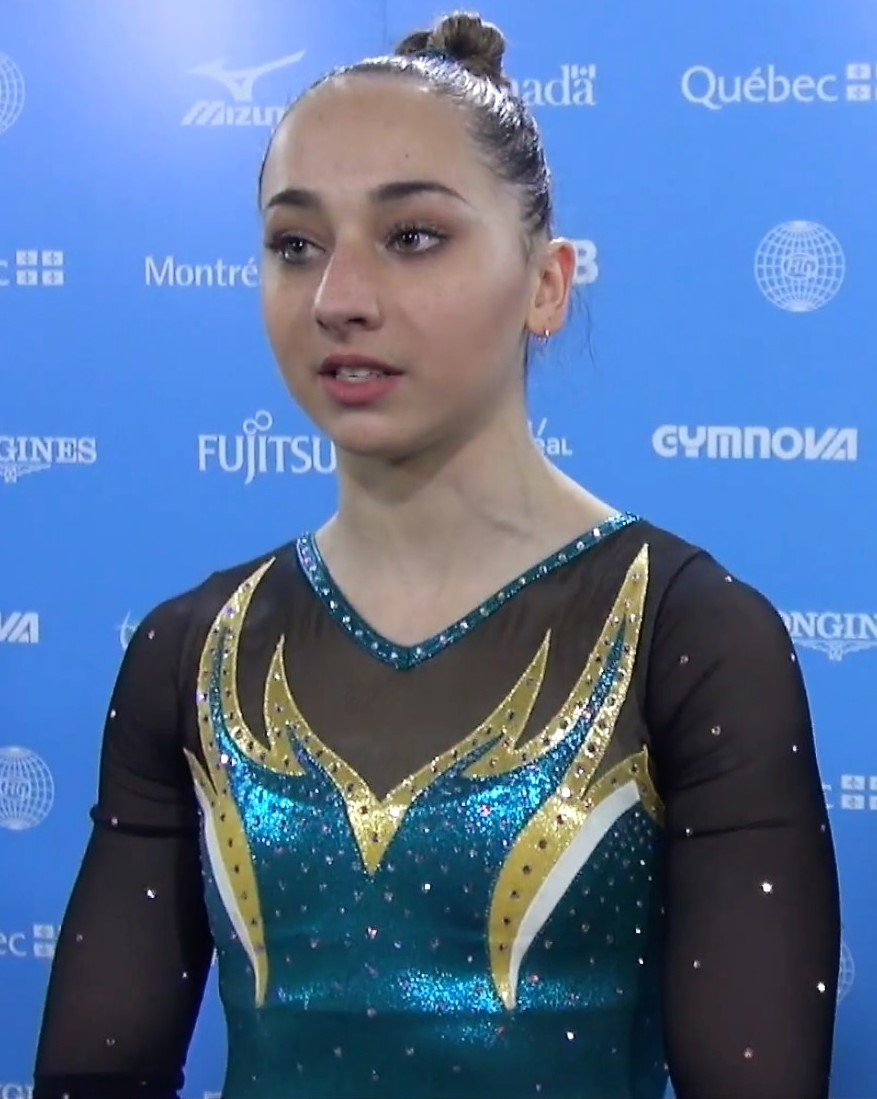
- Folino at the 2017 World Championships

Personal information
- Nickname: Tals
- Born: 18 May 2001 (age 25) Melbourne, Australia

Gymnastics career
- Discipline: Women's artistic gymnastics
- Country represented: Australia; (2015–2020)
- College team: LIU Sharks (2021–2023); Alaska Anchorage Seawolves (2024)
- Club: Waverley Gymnastics Centre
Medal record
Women's artistic gymnastics
Representing Australia
Pacific Rim Championships
| Gold medal – first place | 2018 Medellín | Balance beam |
| Bronze medal – third place | 2018 Medellín | Team |

Talia Folino (born 18 May 2001) is an Australian former artistic gymnast. She won the gold medal on the balance beam at the 2018 Pacific Rim Championships. She represented Australia at the 2017 and 2019 World Championships. After ending her international career, she competed for the LIU Sharks in NCAA gymnastics before transferring to the University of Alaska Anchorage in 2024.

== Gymnastics career ==
=== Junior elite ===
Folino made her international debut at the 2015 City of Jesolo Trophy and finished 14th in the all-around, fifth on the vault, and eighth on the uneven bars, balance beam, and floor exercise. She won the silver medal behind Emily Whitehead at the 2015 Australian Championships but would have won if Australia did not implement bonus points for difficulty. In the event finals, she won gold medals on the vault and balance beam and silver medals on the uneven bars and balance beam. Folino was in first place in the all-around qualifications at the 2016 Australian Championships, but mistakes in the final cost her the title. She did win the national titles on the vault and uneven bars, in addition to a silver medal on the floor exercise and a bronze medal on the balance beam.

=== Senior elite ===
Folino became age-eligible for senior international competitions in 2017. She made her senior debut at the 2017 International Gymnix and won the all-around title. She finished fourth in the all-around at the 2017 Australian Championships. She competed at the 2017 World Championships but did not advance into any finals.

Folino won a bronze medal with the Australian team at the 2018 Pacific Rim Championships. She then won the gold medal in the balance beam final. At the 2018 Australian Championships, she finished fourth in the all-around. She had foot surgery in August 2018 and was unable to compete at the 2018 World Championships.

Folino finished sixth in the all-around at the 2019 Australian Championships. She was selected to compete at the 2019 World Championships alongside Georgia-Rose Brown, Georgia Godwin, Kate McDonald, and Emma Nedov. The team placed 13th in the qualification round, meaning they missed qualifying as a full team for the Olympic Games. The 2020 International Gymnix was the final competition of her international elite career, and she finished 15th in the all-around and fifth on the balance beam.

=== NCAA ===
Folino joined Long Island University's gymnastics team for the 2021 season. She did not compete during her freshman year due to issues getting cleared by the NCAA. She set career highs of 9.750 on both the balance beam and floor exercise during the 2022 season and also vaulted once. She made her uneven bars debut in the 2023 season and set a career high of 9.775. She improved her other career highs to 9.775 on the balance beam and 9.850 on the floor exercise.

Folino transferred to the University of Alaska Anchorage in 2024 for her senior season. However, she tore her ACL before the start of the season and was unable to compete.
