= Lucy Stanhope =

English artistic gymnast

- Full name: Lucy Elizabeth Stanhope
- Born: 19 September 2001 (age 24) Warrington
- Height: 5 ft 3 in (160 cm)

Gymnastics career
- Discipline: Women's artistic gymnastics
- Country represented: Great Britain; England
- College team: Utah Red Rocks (2021–23); Nebraska Cornhuskers (2024–25)
- Club: City of Liverpool
Medal record
Representing England
Commonwealth Games
Silver medal – second place	2018 Gold Coast	Team
Representing Utah Red Rocks
NCAA Championships
Bronze medal – third place	2021 Fort Worth	Team
Bronze medal – third place	2022 Fort Worth	Team

Lucy Elizabeth Stanhope (born 19 September 2001) is an English women's artistic gymnast. She represents City of Liverpool Gymnastics Club and is a member of the England and Great Britain senior elite squads.

== Career ==
She represented Team GB at the 2015 European Youth Olympic Festival, earned the Silver medal on Beam at the English Championships in 2017, and came fourth in the all-around competition at the 2018 British Championships.

Her performances earned her a place in the Team England squad where she represented her country in the 2018 Commonwealth Games in Gold Coast, Queensland. She contributed to England's silver medal in the team competition, missing out on the Gold Medal by 0.425 points.

She was selected as a member of the team to represent Great Britain in the 2018 European Women's Artistic Gymnastics Championships in Glasgow, where she performed on vault and bars. The team placed fourth.

=== College career ===
On 23 November 2018 Stanhope announced her commitment to the University of Arkansas to compete for the Arkansas Razorbacks gymnastics team for the 2020-21 academic year. However, on 16 September 2019 she announced she had switched her verbal commitment to the University of Utah to compete for the Utah Red Rocks gymnastics team for the 2020-21 academic year.
