= Maisie Methuen =

British artistic gymnast (born 2001)

- Full name: Maisie Rose Methuen
- Born: 22 June 2001 (age 25) Wales
- Height: 1.5 m (4 ft 11 in)

Gymnastics career
- Discipline: Women's artistic gymnastics
- Country represented: Great Britain; Wales
- Club: Phoenix Gymnastics
- Retired: July 2019
Medal record
Representing Wales
Northern European Championships
Gold medal – first place	2014 Greve	Team
Gold medal – first place	2014 Greve	All-Around
Silver medal – second place	2014 Greve	Floor Exercise

Maisie Rose Methuen (born 22 June 2001) is a retired artistic gymnast for Wales and Great Britain.

Methuen represented Wales at the 2018 Commonwealth Games.

== Career ==
=== Espoir ===
==== 2014 ====
In March, Methuen won silver behind Latalia Bevan in the Espoir division of the Welsh Championships and went on to be crowned the 2014 British Espoir Champion later that year.

=== Junior ===
==== 2015 ====
Methuen won gold in the junior all-around at the 2015 Welsh Championships, and placed second behind Catherine Lyons in the junior division at the 2015 British Championships.

Representing Great Britain at the 2015 European Youth Olympic Festival in Tbilisi, Georgia, Methuen won a silver medal on balance beam.

==== 2016 ====
Methuen was crowned the 2016 British Junior Champion.

At the 2016 European Women's Artistic Gymnastics Championships, Methuen won a silver medal with the team in the team final, placed fourth in the junior all-around final. She also qualified to the junior balance beam final where she placed fifth.

=== Senior ===
==== 2017 ====
In her first Senior British Championships, Methuen won floor exercise gold. She won joint silver, with Alice Kinsella, in the all-around competition, with both gymnasts scoring 53.300.

Methuen also placed second all-around in her first Senior Welsh Championships.

==== 2018 ====
In 2018, at the British Championships, Methuen placed seventh all-around, and won a gold medal on balance beam.

Methuen was selected to represent Wales at the 2018 Commonwealth Games in the Gold Coast, Australia. Methuen placed fourth with the Welsh team in the team final and placed seventh individually in the all-around final.

== Competitive history ==
Year	Event	Team	AA	VT	UB	BB	FX
Espoir
2014	Welsh Championships		2nd place, silver medalist(s)				
2014	British Championships		1st place, gold medalist(s)				
2014	Northern European Championships	1st place, gold medalist(s)	1st place, gold medalist(s)				2nd place, silver medalist(s)
Junior
2015	Welsh Championships		1st place, gold medalist(s)				
2015	British Championships		2nd place, silver medalist(s)				
2015	European Youth Olympic Festival	7	12	7		2nd place, silver medalist(s)	
2016	British Championships		1st place, gold medalist(s)				
2016	European Championships	2nd place, silver medalist(s)	4			5	
Senior
2017	Welsh Championships		2nd place, silver medalist(s)				
2017	British Championships		2nd place, silver medalist(s)				1st place, gold medalist(s)
2018
2018	Commonwealth Games	4	7				
2018	British Championships		7		6	1st place, gold medalist(s)	4
