= Stella Ashcroft =

New Zealand artistic gymnast (born 2002)

- Born: 27 July 2002 (age 24) Christchurch, New Zealand
- Height: 159 cm (5 ft 3 in)

Gymnastics career
- Discipline: Women's artistic gymnastics
- Country represented: New Zealand
- Club: Christchurch School of Gymnastics
- Head coaches: Terry and Tamara Walker

Stella Ashcroft (born 27 July 2002) is a New Zealand former artistic gymnast. She competed at the 2018 Commonwealth Games and finished 13th in the all-around final. At the junior level, she won a bronze medal on the vault at the 2016 Pacific Rim Championships and won three medals at the 2016 Junior Commonwealth Championships.

== Gymnastics career ==
=== Junior ===
Ashcroft made her international debut at the 2016 Pacific Rim Championships, and she won the bronze medal on the vault in the junior division. At the 2016 New Zealand Championships, she swept the gold medals in the all-around and all four event finals in the junior competition. She helped the New Zealand team win the bronze medal at the 2016 Junior Commonwealth Gymnastics Championships in Namibia. Individually, she won the gold medal in the balance beam final and the silver medal in the floor exercise final. She finished 10th in the junior all-around at the 2017 WOGA Classic.

=== Senior ===
In 2018, Ashcroft received a New Zealand Racing Board Scholarship. That year, she became age-eligible for senior competitions. She was selected to make her senior debut at the 2018 Melbourne World Cup. There, she qualified for the balance beam final and finished seventh. She was selected to represent New Zealand at the 2018 Commonwealth Games as the only female artistic gymnast on the team. She finished 14th in the all-around during the qualification round and advanced to the final, and she was the second reserve for the balance beam final. She ultimately finished 13th in the all-around final. The Commonwealth Games were the final competition of her gymnastics career.
