= Alexandra Eade =

Australian artistic gymnast

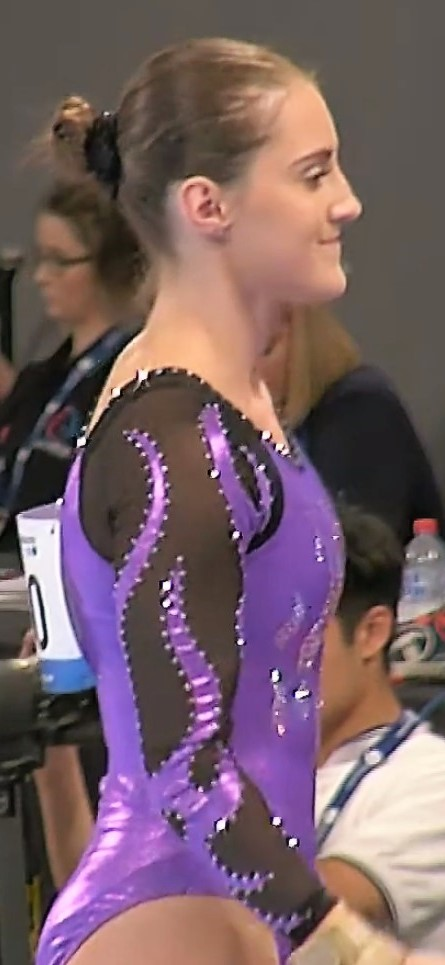
- Eade at the 2018 World Cup Gymnastics Melbourne

Personal information
- Born: 15 January 1998 (age 28) Wahroonga, Australia

Gymnastics career
- Country represented: Australia
Medal record
Artistic Gymnastics World Cup
| Gold medal – first place | 2018 Melbourne | Floor Exercise |
Commonwealth Games
| Gold medal – first place | 2018 Gold Coast | Floor |
| Bronze medal – third place | 2018 Gold Coast | Team all-Around |

Alexandra Eade (born 15 January 1998) is a retired Australian artistic gymnast.

Eade competed at the 2018 Commonwealth Games where she won a gold medal in the floor event and a bronze medal in the team all-around event.

She is currently studying a bachelor of biomedical science at Deakin University.
