= Kiara Munteanu =

Australian artistic gymnast

- Full name: Kiara Lisa Munteanu
- Born: 17 December 1997 (age 28) Melbourne, Australia

Gymnastics career
- Discipline: Women's artistic gymnastics
- Country represented: Australia
- Club: National Centre of Excellence
- Head coaches: Misha Barabach; Tracey Penaluna; Lisa Bradley
- Former coach: Karen Baker

Kiara Lisa Munteanu (17 December 1997) is an Australian gymnast. Munteanu was part of Australia's women's gymnastics team for the 2014 and 2015 World Championships.

== Early life ==
Munteanu was born in Melbourne, Victoria. She began practicing gymnastics at age 4. Her mother put her in gymnastics because she was energetic and very active. Her first gym was Niddrie Gymnastics.

== Career ==
Munteanu became an elite gymnast at 11 years old. Munteanu began competing as at the senior level in 2012. That year, she placed first in floor exercise and second all-around at the Australian national championships. She was named to Australia's team for the World Gymnastics Championships in 2014 and 2015 where the team placed seventh and fourteenth, respectively. Munteanu also competed at the Pacific Rim 2014 Gymnastics Championships, placing sixth in uneven bars and tenth all-around. She was named a non-traveling reserve for the 2016 Pacific Rim Championships, a test event for the 2016 Summer Olympics.

Munteanu trains at High Performance Centre located in Prahran, Victoria. She is coached by Misha Barabach, Tracey Penaluna and Lisa Bradley.
