= Kinsella =

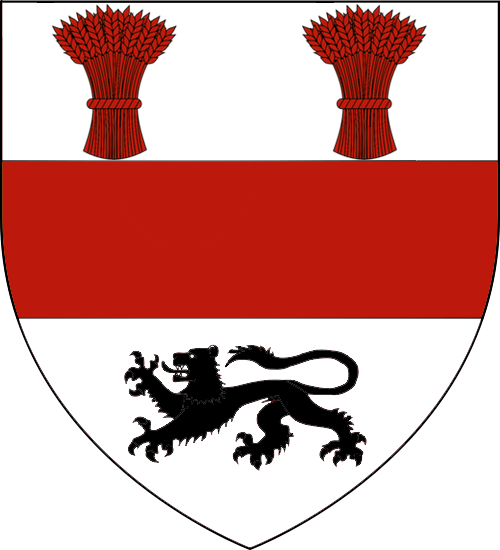
Kinsella.

Kinsella is a surname of Irish origin, developed from the original form Cinnsealach, meaning "proud". The Kinsella sept is native in part of the modern County Wexford in Leinster, a district formerly called the Kinsellaghs. The oldest documentary mention of the surname appears in the Ancient Records of Leinster, dated to 1170, where the son of the King of Leinster is named as Enna Cinsealach. Originally pronounced /ˈkɪnsələ/ KIN-səl-ə, it is also often found pronounced /kɪnˈsɛlə/ kihn-SEL-lə (especially in Australia and New Zealand). This surname is most often found in Ireland, Northern Europe, Australia and New Zealand.

According to historian C. Thomas Cairney, the Kinsellas were one of the chiefly families of the Uí Ceinnselaig who in turn were a tribe from the Dumnonii or Laigin who were the third wave of Celts to settle in Ireland during the first century BC. The Kinsellas as one of the chiefly families of the Uí Ceinnselaig is supported by John O'Hart in his 1892 Irish Pedigrees; or, The Origin and Stem of The Irish Nation who gives the spelling as Kinselagh.

== People with this surname ==
- Alice Kinsella (born 2001), British gymnast
- Arthur Kinsella (1918–2004), New Zealand politician
- Ben Kinsella (1991–2008), English murder victim
- Bob Kinsella (1899–1951), American baseball outfielder
- Brian Kinsella (1954–2018), Canadian ice hockey player
- Brooke Kinsella (born 1983), English actress
- Douglas Kinsella (1932–2004), Canadian medical ethics expert
- Eamonn Kinsella (1932–1991), Irish athlete
- Edward Kinsella (disambiguation), several people
- Elaine Kinsella (born 1981), Irish radio presenter and writer
- James Kinsella (disambiguation), several people
- John Kinsella (disambiguation), several people
- Kevin Kinsella, American reggae and roots rock musician
- Lauren Kinsella (born 1983), Irish musician
- Len Kinsella (born 1946), Scottish footballer
- Lewis Kinsella (born 1994), English footballer
- Liam Kinsella, English-born Irish footballer
- Mark Kinsella (born 1972), Irish footballer
- Mike Kinsella (born 1977), American musician
- Nate Kinsella (born 1980), American musician
- Niels Kinsella, Irish musician, member of God Is an Astronaut
- Noël Kinsella (born 1939), Canadian senator
- Owen Kinsella, Irish football player
- Pat Kinsella, English footballer
- Ray Kinsella (1911–1996), Canadian ice hockey player
- Sophie Kinsella (1969–2025), English novelist
- Stephan Kinsella (born 1965), American lawyer and author
- Ted Kinsella (1893–1967), Australian politician and judge
- Torsten Kinsella, Irish musician, member of God Is an Astronaut
- Thomas Kinsella (1928–2021), Irish poet
- Thomas Kinsella (politician) (1832–1884), American politician
- Tim Kinsella (born 1974), American musician
- Tommy Kinsella (1941–2009), Irish soccer player
- Tony Kinsella (born 1961), English footballer
- Warren Kinsella (born 1960), Canadian lawyer and author
- Walter Kinsella (disambiguation), several people
- W. P. Kinsella (1935–2016), Canadian author

== Fictional people ==
- Ray Kinsella, a character in the film Field of Dreams. Also, the fictional protagonist in J.D. Salinger's short story "A Young Girl in 1941 With No Waist at All."

== Spelling variations ==
- Kinch
- Kinchella
- Kincheloe
- Kinchley
- Kinchsular
- Kingslagh
- Kingslaghe
- Kingsley
- Kinsela
- Kinsella
- Kinshellagh
- Kinshlagh
- Kinslayer
- Kinsler
- Kynsellagh
- Kynsellaghe
- O'Kinsella
- O'Cinnseallaigh
- Kinsley

== See also ==
- Kinsella Peak, a mountain peak in Antarctica
- Kinsella, Alberta, Canada, a hamlet
- Uí Ceinnselaig, an Irish dynasty of Leinster
- Irish clans
