= Gymnastics at the 2022 Commonwealth Games – Women's balance beam =

Women's balance beam at the 2022 Commonwealth Games
- Venue: Arena Birmingham
- Dates: 30 July 2022 (qualification); 2 August 2022 (final)
- Competitors: 8 from 5 nations
- Winning score: 13.466

Medalists
gold medal	Kate McDonald	Australia
silver medal	Georgia Godwin	Australia
bronze medal	Emma Spence	Canada

The Women's balance beam competition at the 2022 Commonwealth Games took place on August 2 at the Arena Birmingham in Birmingham.

== Schedule ==
The schedule was as follows:

All times are British Summer Time (UTC+1)

Date	Time	Round
Saturday 30 July 2022	09:09	Qualification
Tuesday 2 August 2022	14:05	Final

== Results ==
=== Qualification ===
Qualification for this apparatus final was determined within the team final. The results are as follows:

Rank	Gymnast	Difficulty	Execution	Penalty	Total	Notes
1	Georgia Godwin (AUS)	5.800	7.800		13.600	Q
2	Alice Kinsella (ENG)	5.600	7.850		13.450	Q
3	Georgia-Mae Fenton (ENG)	5.300	8.000		13.300	Q
4	Ondine Achampong (ENG)	5.700	7.600		13.300	–
5	Kate McDonald (AUS)	5.000	7.950		12.950	Q
6	Jea Maracha (WAL)	4.700	7.850		12.550	Q
7	Sofia Micallef (WAL)	4.500	7.950		12.450	Q
8	Poppy-Grace Stickler (WAL)	4.700	7.750		12.450	–
9	Breanna Scott (AUS)	5.600	6.950	-0.1	12.450	–
10	Emma Spence (CAN)	5.000	7.150		12.150	Q
11	Shante Koti (RSA)	4.600	7.500		12.100	Q
12	Cassie Lee (CAN)	4.600	7.500		12.100	R1
13	Jenna Lalonde (CAN)	4.200	7.800		12.000	–
14	Mammule Rankoe (RSA)	4.400	7.550		11.950	R2
15	Emily Whitehead (AUS)	4.700	7.250		11.950	–
16	Shannon Archer (SCO)	5.300	6.650		12.250	R3
17	Cara Kennedy (SCO)	4.500	7.200		11.700	
18	Laurie Denommée (CAN)	5.200	6.500		11.700	
19	Claudia Fragapane (ENG)	4.600	7.050		11.650	
20	Emily Bremner (SCO)	4.700	6.800		11.500	
21	Kaitlyn Lim (SGP)	4.500	6.900		11.400	
22	Ruthuja Nataraj (IND)	4.100	7.250		11.350	
23	Eilidh Gorrell (SCO)	4.200	7.150		11.350	
24	Caitlin Rooskrantz (RSA)	4.800	6.300		11.100	
25	Emma Yap (SGP)	4.400	6.650		11.050	
26	Pranati Nayak (IND)	4.700	6.300		11.000	
27	Naveen Daries (RSA)	4.800	6.000		10.800	
28	Mia Evans (WAL)	4.700	5.950	-0.1	10.550	
29	Danyella Richards (JAM)	4.400	5.850		10.250	
30	Tatiana Bachurina (CYP)	4.000	6.200	-0.1	10.100	
31	Tara Donnelly (IOM)	4.500	5.600		10.100	
32	Nadine Joy Nathan (SGP)	4.700	5.150	-0.1	9.750	
33	Milka Gehani (SRI)	5.000	4.750		9.750	
34	Annalise Newman-Achee (TTO)	4.200	5.250		9.450	
35	Shandy Poh (SGP)	4.000	5.200		9.200	
36	Kumudi Abeyratne (SRI)	3.900	5.200		9.100	
37	Amaya Kalukottage (SRI)	2.300	6.250		8.550	
38	Kaushini Gamage (SRI)	2.700	5.300		8.000	
39	Erin Pinder (BAR)	3.400	3.400		6.800	

=== Final ===
The results are as follows:

Position	Gymnast	D Score	E Score	Penalty	Total
1st place, gold medalist(s)	Kate McDonald (AUS)	5.100	8.366		13.466
2nd place, silver medalist(s)	Georgia Godwin (AUS)	5.800	7.633		13.433
3rd place, bronze medalist(s)	Emma Spence (CAN)	5.100	7.966		13.066
4	Alice Kinsella (ENG)	5.800	7.133		12.933
5	Georgia-Mae Fenton (ENG)	5.300	7.433		12.733
6	Jea Maracha (WAL)	4.800	7.866		12.666
7	Sofia Micallef (WAL)	4.700	7.800		12.500
8	Shante Koti (RSA)	4.600	5.766		10.366
