= Gymnastics at the 2022 Commonwealth Games – Women's artistic individual all-around =

Women's artistic individual all-around at the 2022 Commonwealth Games
- Venue: Arena Birmingham
- Dates: 30 July 2022 (qualification); 31 July 2022 (final)
- Competitors: 18 from 12 nations
- Winning score: 53.550

Medalists
gold medal	Georgia Godwin	Australia
silver medal	Ondine Achampong	England
bronze medal	Emma Spence	Canada

The Women's artistic individual all-around gymnastics competition at the 2022 Commonwealth Games in Birmingham, England was held on 31 July 2022 at the Arena Birmingham.

== Schedule ==
The schedule was as follows:

All times are British Summer Time (UTC+1)

Date	Round
Saturday 30 July 2022	Qualification
Sunday 31 July 2022	Final

== Results ==
=== Qualification ===
Qualification for this all-around final was determined in parallel with the team final. The results are as follows:

Position	Gymnast	Vault (gymnastics)	Uneven bars	Balance beam	Floor (gymnastics)	Total	Notes
1	Alice Kinsella (ENG)	13.900	13.650	13.450	13.450	54.450	Q
2	Ondine Achampong (ENG)	14.150	13.750	13.300	12.550	53.750	Q
3	Georgia Godwin (AUS)	13.750	13.650	13.600	12.650	53.650	Q
4	Georgia-Mae Fenton (ENG)	13.150	14.000	13.300	12.550	52.900	–
5	Emma Spence (CAN)	13.400	12.550	12.150	12.750	50.850	Q
6	Shannon Archer (SCO)	13.900	12.250	11.950	12.400	50.500	Q
7	Laurie Denommée (CAN)	13.650	12.450	11.700	12.650	50.450	Q
8	Emily Whitehead (AUS)	13.400	12.100	11.950	12.750	50.200	Q
9	Jenna Lalonde (CAN)	13.050	12.950	12.000	12.200	50.200	–
10	Caitlin Rooskrantz (RSA)	12.950	13.350	11.100	12.500	49.900	Q
11	Poppy-Grace Stickler (WAL)	13.000	11.250	12.450	12.700	49.400	Q
12	Naveen Daries (RSA)	12.950	12.050	10.800	12.550	48.350	Q
13	Jea Maracha (WAL)	12.950	11.750	12.550	11.950	48.200	Q
14	Cara Kennedy (SCO)	13.350	10.700	11.700	12.250	48.000	Q
15	Emily Bremner (SCO)	12.850	11.550	11.500	12.050	47.950	–
16	Ruthuja Nataraj (IND)	12.300	11.950	11.350	10.650	46.250	Q
17	Mia Evans (WAL)	13.100	11.600	10.550	10.400	45.650	–
18	Eilidh Gorrell (SCO)	11.700	10.750	11.350	11.700	45.500	–
19	Milka Gehani (SRI)	12.800	12.000	9.750	10.650	45.200	Q
20	Nadine Joy Nathan (SGP)	12.700	10.700	9.750	11.450	44.600	Q
21	Emma Yap (SGP)	11.250	10.250	11.500	12.000	44.550	Q
22	Tatiana Bachurina (CYP)	11.550	11.600	10.100	10.600	43.850	Q
23	Tara Donnelly (IOM)	10.950	11.050	10.100	11.600	43.700	Q
24	Danyella Richards (JAM)	12.300	9.900	10.250	11.150	43.600	R1
25	Pranati Nayak (IND)	13.600	9.250	11.000	9.650	43.500	R2
26	Annalise Newman-Achee (TTO)	12.750	5.300	9.450	11.250	38.750	R3
27	Amaya Kalukottage (SRI)	11.900	7.150	8.550	8.750	36.350	R4
28	Erin Pinder (BAR)	12.150	7.500	6.800	8.350	34.800	
29	Kaushini Gamage (SRI)	11.400	7.000	8.000	7.850	34.250	
30	Kumudi Abeyratne (SRI)	10.350	5.500	9.100	7.350	32.300	

=== Final ===
The results are as follows:

Position	Gymnast	Vault (gymnastics)	Uneven bars	Balance beam	Floor (gymnastics)	Total
1st place, gold medalist(s)	Georgia Godwin (AUS)	13.300	13.550	13.750	12.950	53.550
2nd place, silver medalist(s)	Ondine Achampong (ENG)	13.900	13.250	12.500	13.350	53.000
3rd place, bronze medalist(s)	Emma Spence (CAN)	13.550	12.950	13.050	12.800	52.350
4	Alice Kinsella (ENG)	13.850	13.700	11.000	12.050	50.600
5	Poppy-Grace Stickler (WAL)	12.850	12.700	12.150	12.500	50.200
6	Naveen Daries (RSA)	12.950	12.800	11.400	12.700	49.850
7	Laurie Denommee (CAN)	13.200	12.450	10.900	13.150	49.700
8	Shannon Archer (SCO)	13.700	11.400	12.700	11.500	49.300
9	Caitlin Rooskrantz (RSA)	12.850	12.150	10.850	12.500	48.350
10	Jea Maracha (WAL)	11.650	12.400	12.200	11.850	48.100
11	Nadine Joy Nathan (SGP)	12.850	12.050	11.600	11.400	47.900
12	Emily Whitehead (AUS)	12.450	10.950	12.400	11.850	47.650
13	Tara Donnelly (IOM)	12.800	11.100	11.850	11.300	47.050
14	Cara Kennedy (SCO)	12.200	11.450	10.850	12.200	46.700
15	Emma Yap (SGP)	12.050	10.850	11.500	11.850	46.250
16	Tatiana Bachurina (CYP)	11.750	10.900	11.200	10.750	44.600
17	Ruthuja Nataraj (IND)	12.950	10.000	10.250	9.800	43.000
DNF	Milka Gehani (SRI)	-	10.500	10.550	-	-
