= Gymnastics at the 2022 Commonwealth Games – Women's uneven bars =

Women's uneven bars at the 2022 Commonwealth Games
- Venue: Arena Birmingham
- Dates: 30 July 2022 (qualification); 1 August 2022 (final)
- Competitors: 8 from 5 nations
- Winning score: 13.900

Medalists
gold medal	Georgia-Mae Fenton	England
silver medal	Georgia Godwin	Australia
bronze medal	Caitlin Rooskrantz	South Africa

The Women's uneven bars gymnastics competition at the 2022 Commonwealth Games in Birmingham, England was held on 1 August 2022 at the Arena Birmingham.

== Schedule ==
The schedule was as follows:

All times are British Summer Time (UTC+1)

Date	Time	Round
Saturday 30 July 2022	09:09	Qualification
Monday 1 August 2022	15:45	Final

== Results ==
=== Qualification ===
Qualification for this apparatus final was determined within the team final. The results are as follows:

Rank	Gymnast	Difficulty	Execution	Penalty	Total	Notes
1	Georgia-Mae Fenton (ENG)	5.800	8.200		14.000	Q
2	Ondine Achampong (ENG)	6.100	7.650		13.750	Q
3	Georgia Godwin (AUS)	5.600	8.050		13.650	Q
4	Alice Kinsella (ENG)	5.700	7.950		13.650	–
5	Kate McDonald (AUS)	5.600	7.900		13.500	Q
6	Romi Brown (AUS)	5.300	8.100		13.400	–
7	Caitlin Rooskrantz (RSA)	5.800	7.550		13.350	Q
8	Jenna Lalonde (CAN)	5.000	7.950		12.950	Q
9	Emma Spence (CAN)	4.900	7.650		12.550	Q
10	Laurie Denommée (CAN)	4.900	7.550		12.450	–
11	Shannon Archer (SCO)	4.800	7.450		12.250	Q
12	Emily Whitehead (AUS)	5.100	7.000		12.100	–
13	Naveen Daries (RSA)	4.900	7.150		12.050	R1
14	Milka Gehani (SRI)	4.800	7.200		12.000	R2
15	Ruthuja Nataraj (IND)	4.500	7.450		11.950	R3
16	Rachel Yeoh Li Wen (MAS)	4.800	7.000		11.800	
17	Kelly Simm (ENG)	5.700	6.100		11.800	
18	Jea Maracha (WAL)	4.600	7.150		11.750	
19	Sofia Micallef (WAL)	4.300	7.400		11.700	
20	Mia Evans (WAL)	4.200	7.400		11.600	
21	Tatiana Bachurina (CYP)	4.500	7.100		11.600	
22	Emily Bremner (SCO)	4.100	7.450		11.550	
23	Garcelle Napier (RSA)	4.400	7.100		11.500	
24	Poppy-Grace Stickler (WAL)	4.700	6.550		11.250	
25	Tara Donnelly (IOM)	4.100	6.950		11.050	
26	Mammule Rankoe (RSA)	4.200	6.700		10.900	
27	Eilidh Gorrell (SCO)	4.500	6.250		10.750	
28	Cara Kennedy (SCO)	3.400	7.300		10.700	
29	Nadine Joy Nathan (SGP)	4.300	6.400		10.700	
30	Maya Zonneveld (CAN)	4.300	6.250		10.550	
31	Emma Yap (SGP)	2.700	7.550		10.250	
32	Shandy Poh (SGP)	2.100	7.850		9.950	
33	Danyella Richards (JAM)	2.800	7.100		9.900	
34	Yuet Yung Cheong (SGP)	2.800	6.700		9.500	
35	Pranati Nayak (IND)	4.100	5.150		9.250	
36	Erin Pinder (BAR)	1.900	5.600		7.500	
37	Amaya Kalukottage (SRI)	1.600	5.550		7.150	
38	Kaushini Gamage (SRI)	1.400	5.600		7.000	
39	Kumudi Abeyratne (SRI)	1.200	4.300		5.500	
40	Annalise Newman-Achee (TTO)	3.000	6.800	-4.5	5.300	

=== Final ===
The results are as follows:

Rank	Gymnast	Difficulty	Execution	Penalty	Total
1st place, gold medalist(s)	Georgia-Mae Fenton (ENG)	5.700	8.200		13.900
2nd place, silver medalist(s)	Georgia Godwin (AUS)	5.600	7.900		13.500
3rd place, bronze medalist(s)	Caitlin Rooskrantz (RSA)	5.800	7.633		13.433
4	Ondine Achampong (ENG)	6.000	7.433		13.433
5	Jenna Lalonde (CAN)	5.000	8.333		13.333
6	Emma Spence (CAN)	5.000	7.733		12.733
7	Kate McDonald (AUS)	5.300	7.233		12.533
8	Shannon Archer (SCO)	4.800	7.566		12.366
