= Kinsela =

Kinsela may refer to:

== People ==
- John Kinsela (1950–2020), Australian-indigenous wrestler and officer

== Character ==
- Damon Kinsela, from Hollyoaks

== See also ==
- Kinsella
