= Gymnastics at the 2018 Commonwealth Games – Women's artistic individual all-around =

Women's artistic individual all-around at the 2018 Commonwealth Games
- Venue: Coomera Indoor Sports Centre
- Dates: 6 April 2018 (qualification); 7 April 2018 (final)
- Competitors: 18 from 10 nations
- Winning score: 54.200

Medalists
gold medal	Ellie Black	Canada
silver medal	Georgia Godwin	Australia
bronze medal	Alice Kinsella	England

The Women's artistic individual all-around gymnastics competition at the 2018 Commonwealth Games in Gold Coast, Australia was held on 7 April 2018 at the Coomera Indoor Sports Centre.

== Schedule ==
The schedule is as follows:

All times are Australian Eastern Standard Time (UTC+10:00)

Date	Time	Round
Friday 6 April 2018	09:09	Qualification
Saturday 7 April 2018	16:41	Final

== Results ==
=== Qualification ===
Qualification for this all-around final was determined within the team final.

=== Final ===
The results are as follows:

Position	Gymnast	Vault (gymnastics)	Uneven bars	Balance beam	Floor (gymnastics)	Total
1st place, gold medalist(s)	Ellie Black (CAN)	14.400	13.500	12.850	13.450	54.200
2nd place, silver medalist(s)	Georgia Godwin (AUS)	13.800	13.750	13.150	13.100	53.800
3rd place, bronze medalist(s)	Alice Kinsella (ENG)	14.050	13.400	13.150	12.550	53.150
4	Georgia Rose Brown (AUS)	13.600	13.700	12.750	12.950	53.000
5	Kelly Simm (ENG)	14.100	13.650	11.950	12.900	52.600
6	Latalia Bevan (WAL)	13.700	12.800	12.750	13.300	52.550
7	Maisie Methuen (WAL)	13.600	12.900	13.300	12.750	52.500
8	Isabela Onyshko (CAN)	13.350	13.300	12.550	12.700	51.900
9	Cara Kennedy (SCO)	13.700	11.200	11.950	12.300	49.150
10	Shannon Archer (SCO)	13.700	11.000	12.050	12.100	48.850
11	Tan Ing Yueh (MAS)	13.100	10.700	12.200	11.400	47.400
12	Farah Ann Abdul Hadi (MAS)	13.300	11.050	11.550	10.975	46.875
13	Stella Ashcroft (NZL)	12.950	9.900	11.700	11.500	46.050
14	Aruna Reddy (IND) (Note: Competing as first reserve in lieu of Claudia Cummins of South Africa.)	13.650	10.200	9.000	11.550	44.400
15	Nicole Burns (IOM)	10.250	10.900	11.650	11.500	44.300
16	Pranati Das (IND)	12.900	10.050	9.900	11.050	43.900
17	Bonita Shurmer (JER)	11.950	10.000	10.850	10.750	43.550
18	Rachelle Flambard (JER) (Note: Competing as second reserve in lieu of Naveen Daries of South Africa.)	11.500	9.400	10.900	10.650	42.450
