= Emma Spence =

Canadian artistic gymnast

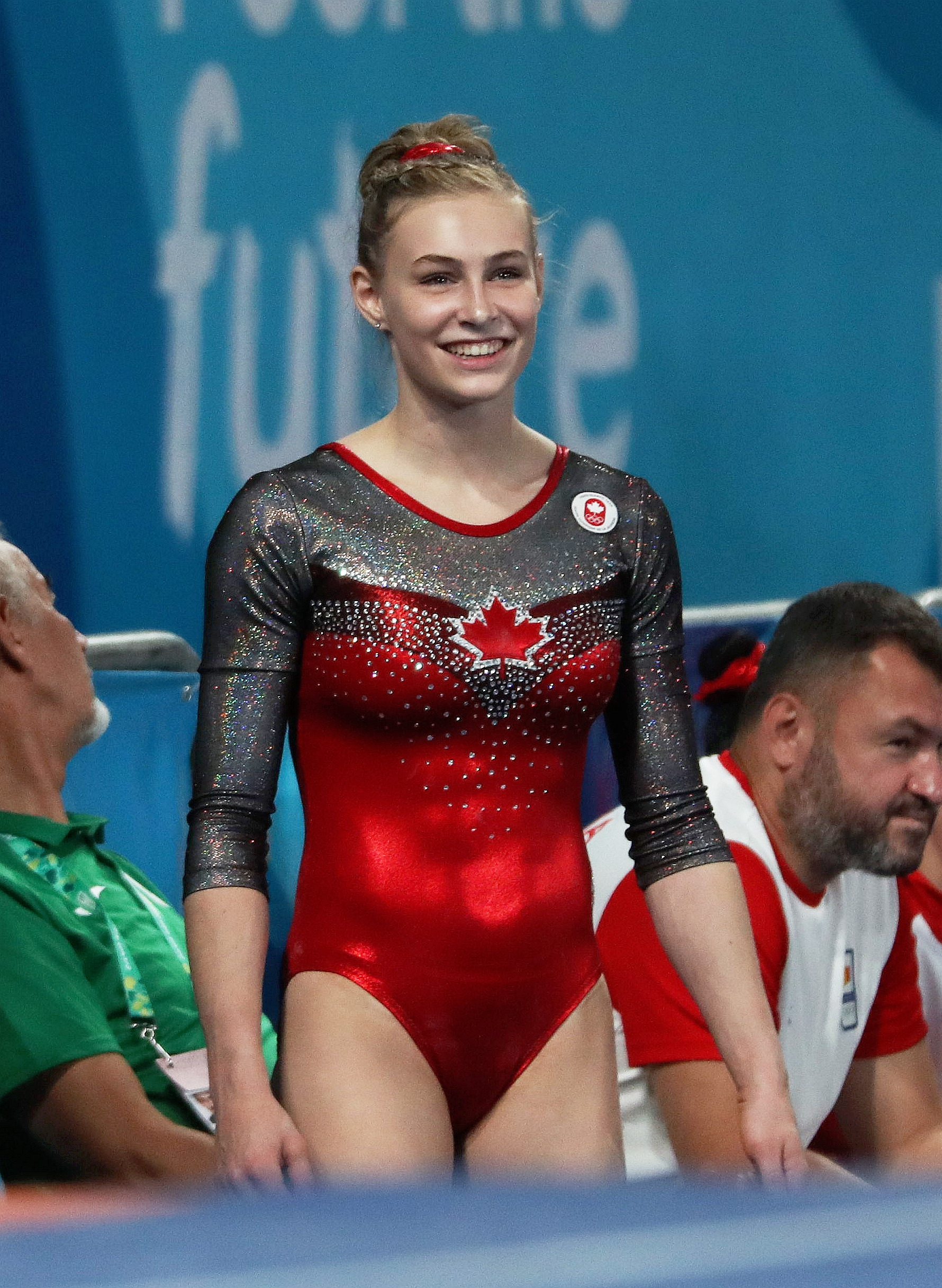
- Spence at the 2018 Youth Olympic Games

Personal information
- Full name: Emma Kathryn Mary Spence
- Born: 27 February 2003 (age 23) Cambridge, Ontario, Canada
- Height: 5 ft 6 in (168 cm)

Gymnastics career
- Discipline: Women's artistic gymnastics
- Country represented: Canada (2017–2024)
- College team: Nebraska Cornhuskers (2022–25)
- Club: Burlington Gymnastics and University of Nebraska
- Head coaches: Kathy Hubbard and Heather Brink
- Former coaches: Elvira Saadi and Denis Vachon
Medal record
Women's artistic gymnastics
Representing Canada
World Championships
| Bronze medal – third place | 2022 Liverpool | Team |
Commonwealth Games
| Bronze medal – third place | 2022 Birmingham | Team |
| Bronze medal – third place | 2022 Birmingham | All-around |
| Bronze medal – third place | 2022 Birmingham | Balance beam |
Pan American Championships
| Silver medal – second place | 2024 Santa Marta | Team |
| Bronze medal – third place | 2024 Santa Marta | Vault |
Youth Olympic Games
| Bronze medal – third place | 2018 Buenos Aires | Vault |
Event / 1st / 2nd / 3rd; FIG World Cup / 0 / 0 / 1

Emma Kathryn Mary Spence (born February 27, 2003) is a retired Canadian artistic gymnast. She represented Canada at the 2022 World Championships and won a bronze in the team event, their first team medal. She won bronze with the team at the 2022 Commonwealth Games. Individually she is the 2018 Youth Olympic bronze medallist on vault as well as the 2022 Commonwealth Games all-around and balance beam bronze medalist.

== Early life ==
Emma Spence was born in Cambridge, Ontario in 2003. She is a Franco-Ontarian whose first language is French. Her great-grandmother was sprinter Mary Vandervliet who competed at the 1932 Summer Olympics.

== Junior gymnastics career ==
=== 2016–2017 ===
In 2016 Spence competed at Elite Gym Massilia. She competed on uneven bars, balance beam, and floor exercise and did not qualify to any event finals.

In 2017 Spence competed at Elite Canada where she only competed the uneven bars, vault and the floor exercise, due to injury during the competition. In March she competed at International Gymnix in Montreal where she won gold on the uneven bars. In May she competed at the Canadian Championships where she won silver in the all-around behind Ana Padurariu. Additionally she finished fourth on vault and third on uneven bars and balance beam. She was later selected to represent Canada at the International Junior Japan competition alongside Padurariu. Spence placed eighth in the all-around. Spence ended the season competing at Elite Gym Massilia. She placed 26th in the all-around and fourth on vault.

=== 2018 ===
With Padurariu becoming senior, Spence entered 2018 as the top Canadian junior. In February she competed at Elite Canada where she placed first in the all-around, third on vault and first on uneven bars and floor exercise. In March Spence competed at International Gymnix where she placed sixth in the all-around, seventh on vault, sixth on uneven bars, and eighth on floor exercise. Spence was later selected to represent Canada at the 2018 Pacific Rim Gymnastics Championships. While there she helped Canada win silver in the team final. In the all-around she placed fifth, and she placed fourth on vault and sixth on balance beam and floor exercise. At the Canadian Championships in May Spence placed second in the all-around behind Zoé Allaire-Bourgie. In June Spence represented Canada at the 2018 Junior Pan American Artistic Gymnastics Championships. She placed fifth in the all-around and on balance beam and won silver in the team final. As the top 2003-born gymnast, Spence was selected to represent Canada at the 2018 Youth Olympic Games. While there she qualified to the all-around, vault, balance beam, and floor exercise finals. Spence finished 10th in the all-around final, third on vault behind Giorgia Villa of Italy and Csenge Bácskay of Hungary, fifth on floor exercise, and eighth on balance beam. She was selected as Canada's flag bearer at the closing ceremonies.

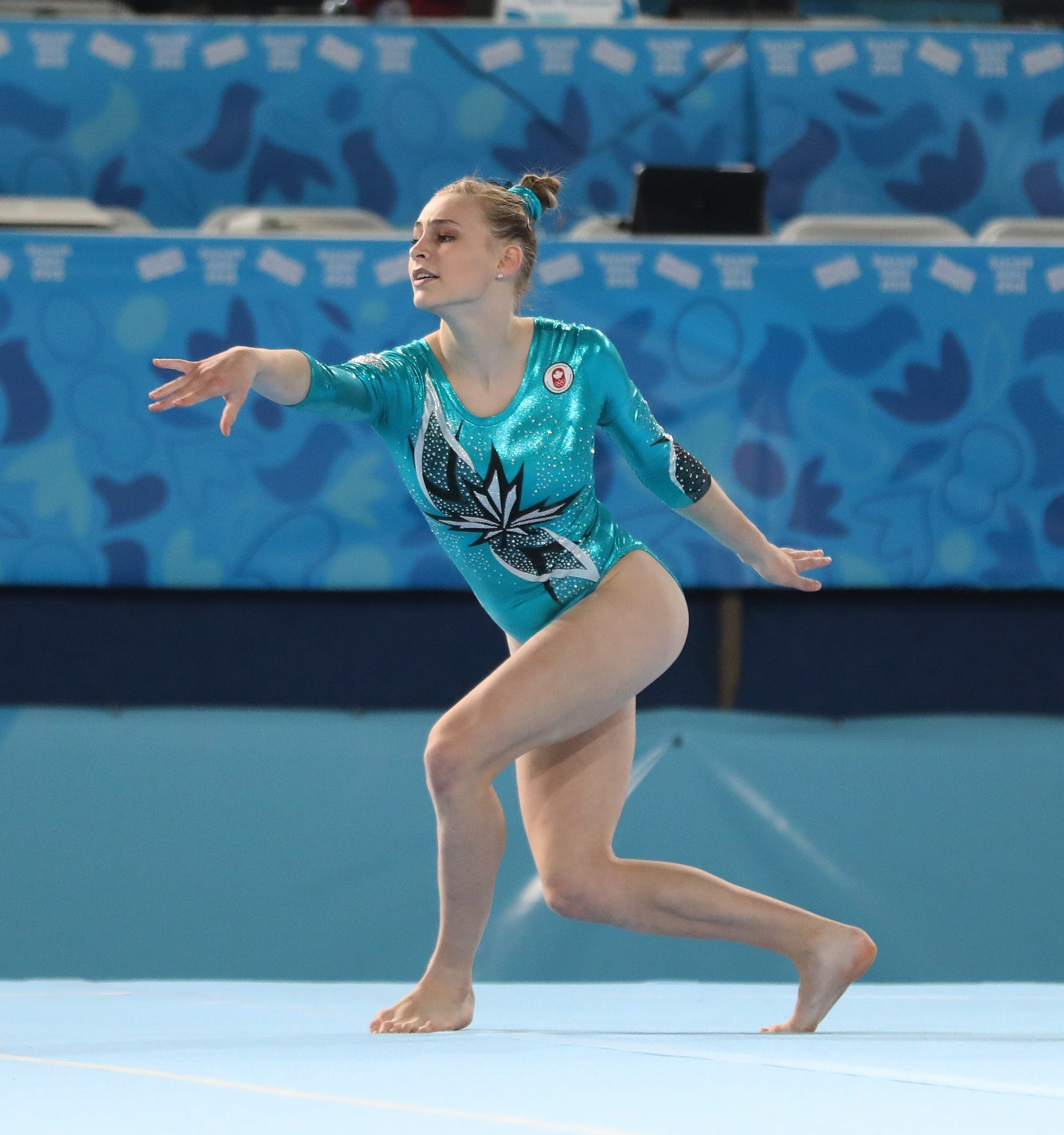
All-Around Final

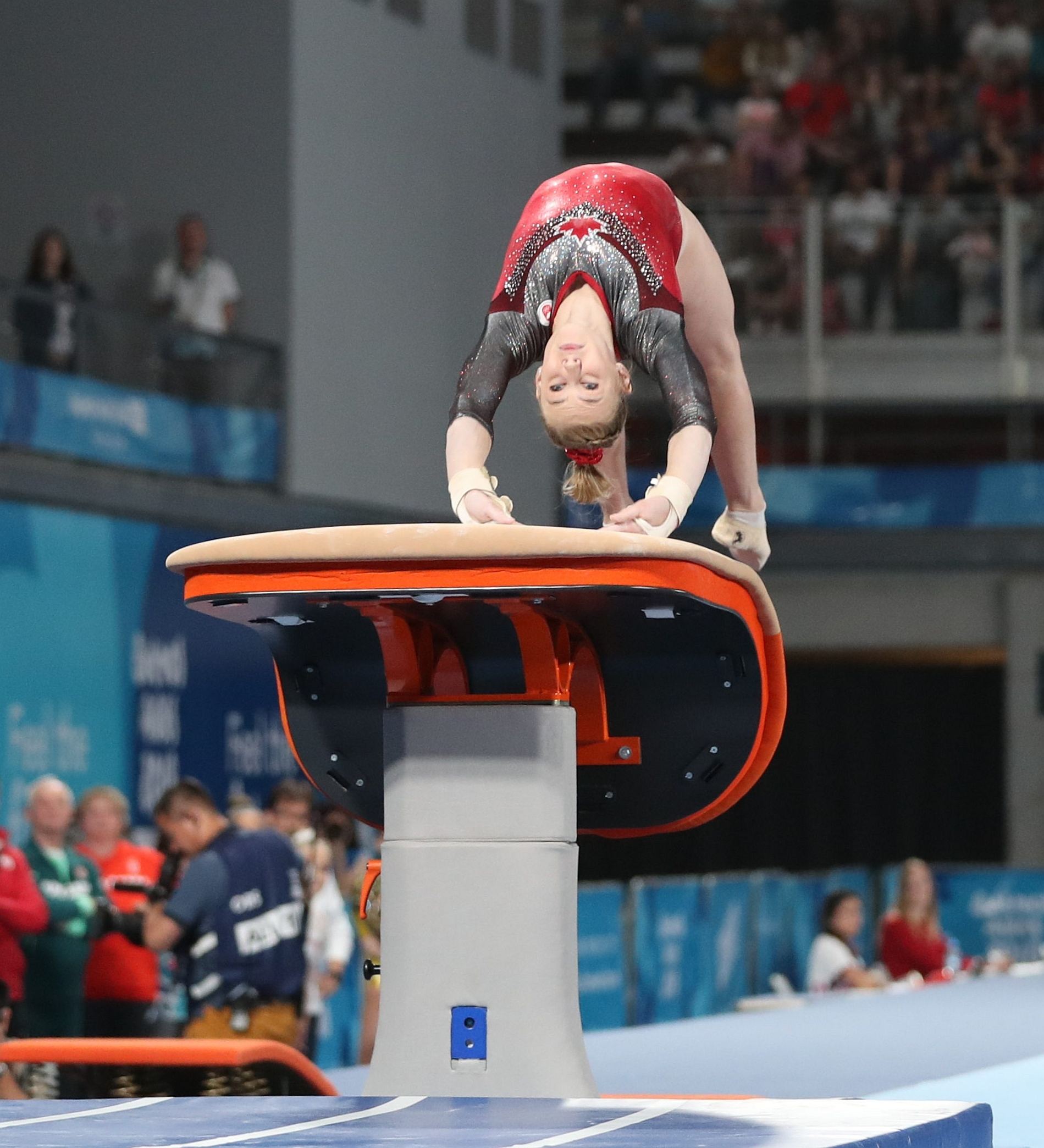
Vault Final

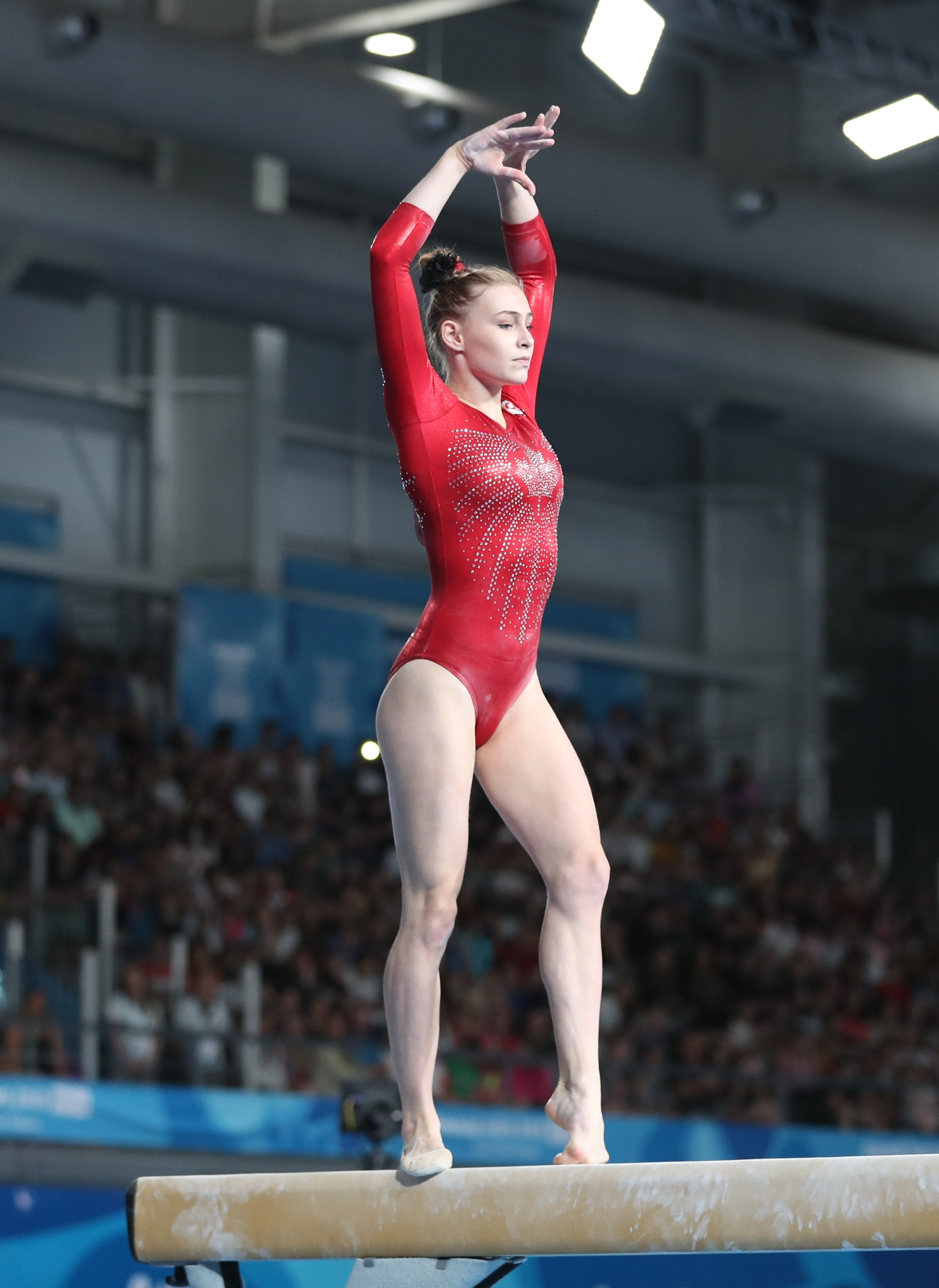
Balance Beam Final

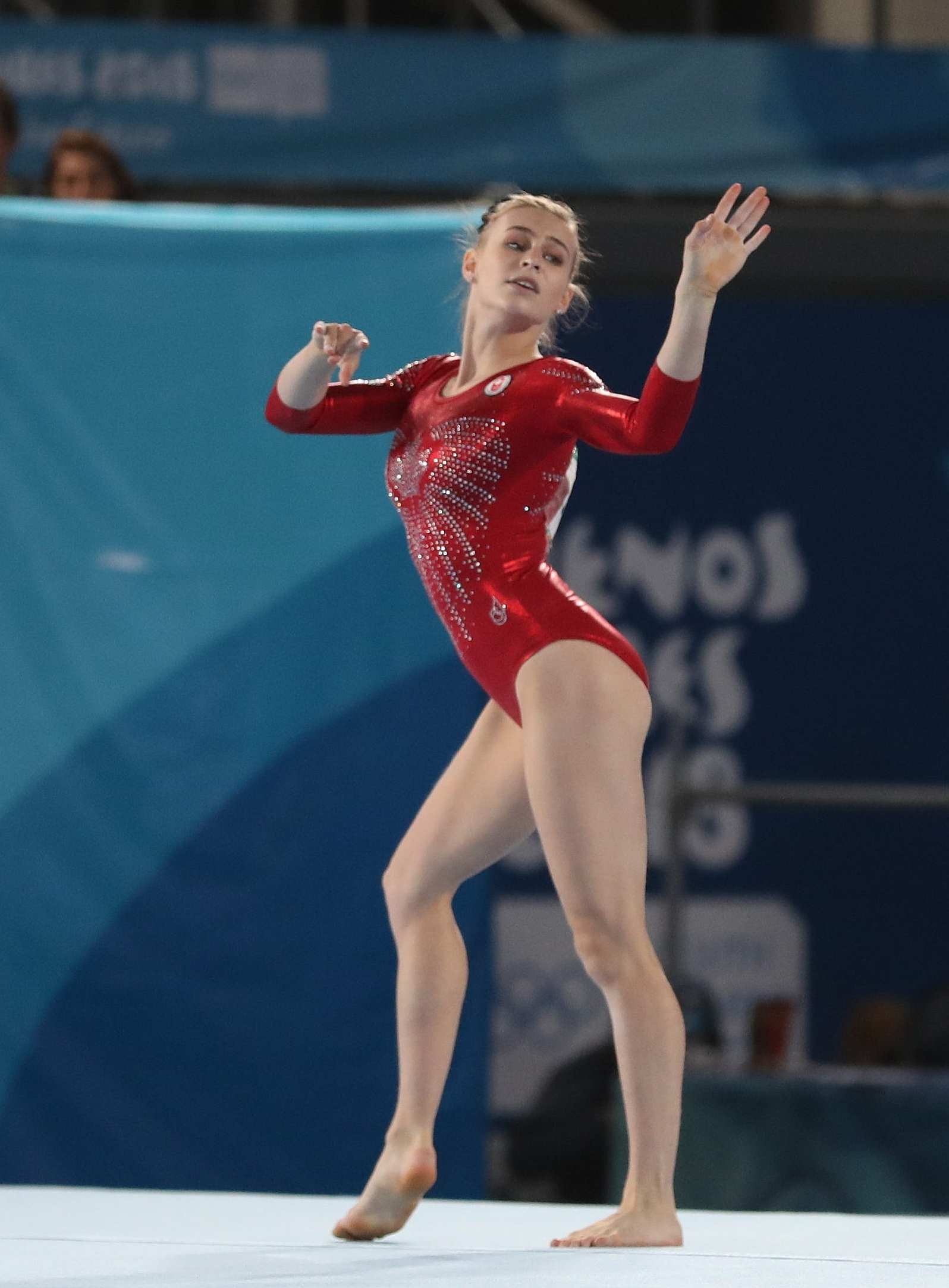
Floor Exercise Final

Spence at the 2018 Youth Olympics

== Senior gymnastics career ==
=== 2019 ===
In 2019, Spence turned senior. She made her debut at Elite Canada where she placed seventh in the all-around and fourth on floor exercise. In March, she competed at the 2019 L'International Gymnix. She helped Canada win the silver medal. Individually, Spence placed 14th in the all-around. In May, Spence competed at the Canadian National Championships. After the first day of competition, she was in seventh place in the all-around. On the second day, Spence withdrew from the competition after only competing on uneven bars due to a knee injury. In June, Spence competed at the Flanders International Team Challenge in Ghent, Belgium alongside Laurie Denommée, Isabela Onyshko, Quinn Skrupa, and Rose-Kaying Woo. Together, they placed fourth in the team final behind the Netherlands, Australia, and Belgium. Individually, Spence placed sixteenth in the all-around.

In September, Spence competed at the Szombathely World Cup where she qualified to the vault, balance beam, and floor exercise finals. During event finals, she won bronze on balance beam behind Noémi Makra of Hungary and Teja Belak of Slovenia and placed sixth on vault and fifth on floor exercise.

=== 2020 ===
In late January, Spence was listed on a nominative roster that was released for the Melbourne World Cup, scheduled to take place on February 20. Her first competition of the season was Elite Canada, where she placed fourth in the all-around behind Ana Padurariu, Brooklyn Moors, and Isabela Onyshko. At the Melbourne World Cup, Spence finished tenth in qualifications on vault and uneven bars and was the second reserve for each of those event finals; however, she qualified to both the balance beam and floor exercise finals. During event finals, she placed eighth on each.

In November, Spence signed her National Letter of Intent with the Nebraska Cornhuskers gymnastics team, intending to start in the 2021–22 school year.

=== 2021 ===
At the Canadian National Championships Spence finished fourth in the all-around behind Ellie Black, Ava Stewart, and Laurie Denommée. She won bronze on the uneven bars and placed tenth and fourteenth on balance beam and floor exercise, respectively. In June, she was named as a non-traveling alternate for the Canadian Olympic team.

=== 2022 ===
Spence was selected to compete at the Commonwealth Games alongside Laurie Denommée, Jenna Lalonde, Cassie Lee, and Maya Zonneveld. On the first day of competition, Spence led the Canadian team to third place behind England and Australia. She was the only individual to qualify to all five event finals. She won bronze in the all-around final behind Georgia Godwin and Ondine Achampong. On the first day of event finals, she placed fourth on vault and sixth on the uneven bars. On the second day, she won her third bronze medal on balance beam, finishing behind Kate McDonald and Godwin. She placed fourth on floor exercise.

Spence was selected to compete at the World Championships alongside Ellie Black, Sydney Turner, Denelle Pedrick, Laurie Denommée, and Shallon Olsen. While there, she helped team Canada win their first medal at the World Championships, a bronze.

== Competitive history ==
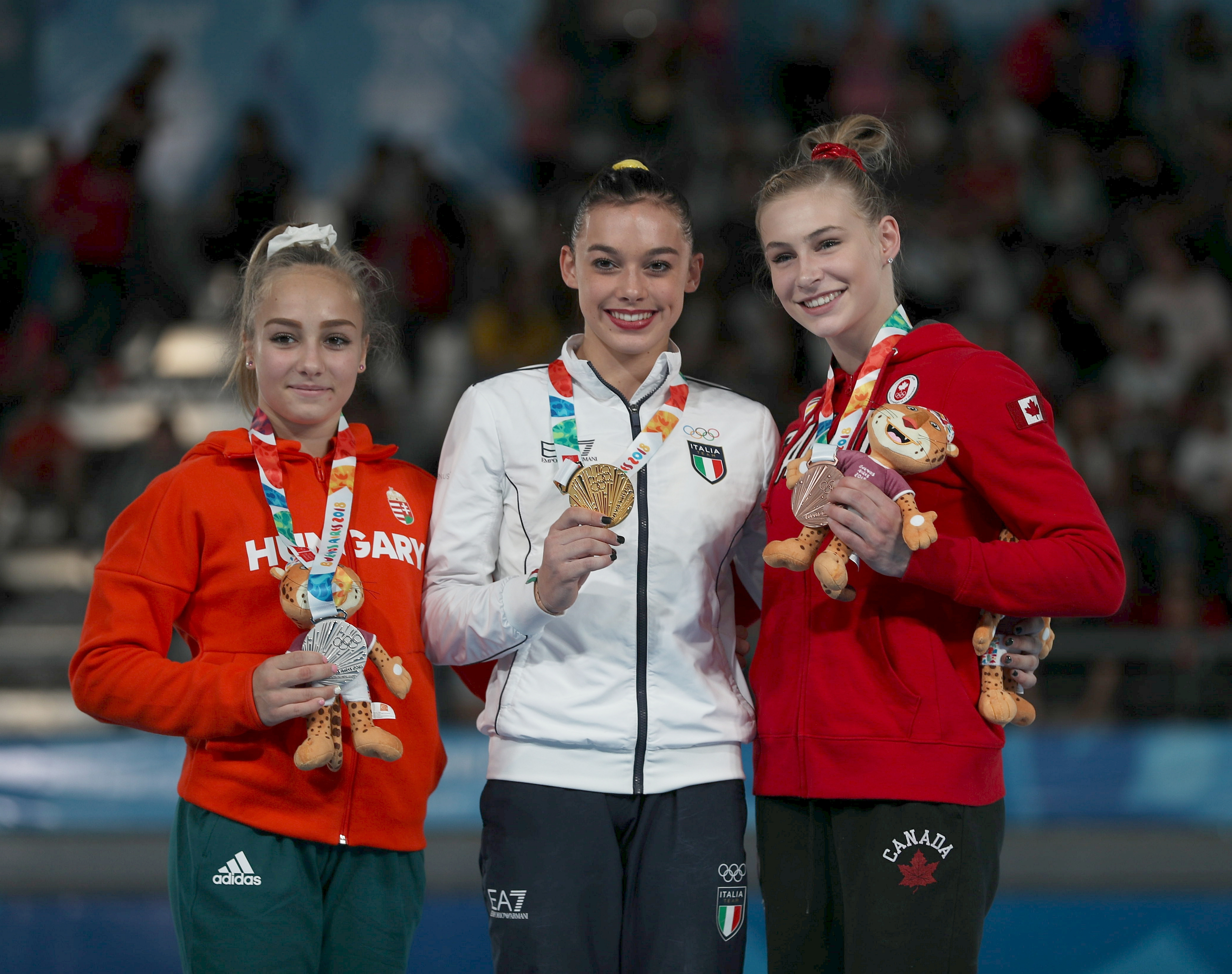
The vault medal podium at the 2018 Youth Olympics

Competitive history of Emma Spence at the junior level
| Year | Event | Team | AA | VT | UB | BB | FX |
|---|---|---|---|---|---|---|---|
| 2017 | International Gymnix | | 22 | | 1st place, gold medalist(s) | | |
| 2017 | Canadian Championships | | 2nd place, silver medalist(s) | | 3rd place, bronze medalist(s) | 3rd place, bronze medalist(s) | |
| 2017 | Junior Japan Intl | | 8 | 7 | 6 | 7 | |
| 2017 | Elite Gym Massilia | | 26 | 4 | | | |
| 2018 | Elite Canada | | 1st place, gold medalist(s) | 3rd place, bronze medalist(s) | 1st place, gold medalist(s) | | 1st place, gold medalist(s) |
| 2018 | International Gymnix | | 6 | 7 | 6 | | 8 |
| 2018 | Pacific Rim Championships | 2nd place, silver medalist(s) | 5 | | 4 | 6 | 6 |
| 2018 | Canadian Championships | | 2nd place, silver medalist(s) | | 3rd place, bronze medalist(s) | 2nd place, silver medalist(s) | |
| 2018 | Pan American Championships | 2nd place, silver medalist(s) | 5 | | | 5 | |
| 2018 | Youth Olympic Games | | 10 | 3rd place, bronze medalist(s) | | 8 | 5 |

Competitive history of Emma Spence at the senior level
| Year | Event | Team | AA | VT | UB | BB | FX |
|---|---|---|---|---|---|---|---|
| 2019 | Elite Canada | | 7 | | | | 4 |
| 2019 | International Gymnix | 2nd place, silver medalist(s) | 14 | | | | |
| 2019 | Canadian Championships | | | | 7 | | |
| 2019 | FIT Challenge | 4 | 16 | | | | |
| 2019 | Szombathely World Cup | | | 6 | | 3rd place, bronze medalist(s) | 5 |
| 2020 | Elite Canada | | 4 | 3rd place, bronze medalist(s) | 4 | 8 | 5 |
| 2020 | Melbourne World Cup | | | R2 | R2 | 8 | 8 |
| 2021 | Canadian Championships | | 4 | | 3rd place, bronze medalist(s) | 10 | 14 |
| 2022 | Big 10 Championships | 6 | 10 | | | 18 | |
| 2022 | Commonwealth Games | 3rd place, bronze medalist(s) | 3rd place, bronze medalist(s) | 4 | 6 | 3rd place, bronze medalist(s) | 4 |
| 2022 | World Championships | 3rd place, bronze medalist(s) | | | | | |
| 2023 | Big Ten Championships | 6 | 9 | 28 | 22 | 14 | 16 |
| 2023 | Gymnova Cup | | 2nd place, silver medalist(s) | 5 | | | 1st place, gold medalist(s) |
| 2024 | City of Jesolo Trophy | 7 | 14 | | | | |
| 2024 | Pan American Championships | 2nd place, silver medalist(s) | 4 | 3rd place, bronze medalist(s) | 5 | 4 | |
| 2024 | Canadian Championships | | 7 | | 5 | 17 | 6 |
| 2025 | Big Ten Championships | 9 | 4 | 17 | 1st place, gold medalist(s) | 14 | 22 |
