= John Kinsella =

John Kinsella may refer to:

- John Kinsella (composer) (1932–2021), Irish composer
- John Kinsella (criminal) (died 2018, age 53), English criminal
- John Kinsella (hurler) (born 1947), Irish sportsperson
- John Kinsella (poet) (born 1963), Australian poet, novelist, critic, essayist and editor
- John Kinsella (swimmer) (born 1952), American Olympic swimmer
- John J. Kinsella, American stained glass manufacturing company

== See also ==
- John Kinsela (1950–2020), Australian wrestler
