= Gymnastics at the 2018 Commonwealth Games – Women's uneven bars =

Women's uneven bars at the 2018 Commonwealth Games
- Venue: Coomera Indoor Sports Centre
- Dates: 6 April 2018 (qualification); 8 April 2018 (final)
- Competitors: 8 from 4 nations
- Winning score: 14.600

Medalists
gold medal	Georgia-Mae Fenton	England
silver medal	Brittany Rogers	Canada
bronze medal	Georgia Godwin	Australia

The Women's uneven bars gymnastics competition at the 2018 Commonwealth Games in Gold Coast, Australia was held on 8 April 2018 at the Coomera Indoor Sports Centre.

== Schedule ==
The schedule is as follows:

All times are Australian Eastern Standard Time (UTC+10:00)

Date	Time	Round
Friday 6 April 2018	09:09	Qualification
Sunday 8 April 2018	16:46	Final

== Results ==
=== Qualification ===
Qualification for this apparatus final was determined within the team final.

=== Final ===
The results are as follows:

Rank	Gymnast	Difficulty	Execution	Penalty	Total
1st place, gold medalist(s)	Georgia-Mae Fenton (ENG)	5.900	8.700		14.600
2nd place, silver medalist(s)	Brittany Rogers (CAN)	5.900	8.300		14.200
3rd place, bronze medalist(s)	Georgia Godwin (AUS)	5.400	8.033		13.433
4	Georgia Rose Brown (AUS)	5.400	7.833		13.233
5	Isabela Onyshko (CAN)	5.800	7.400		13.200
6	Kelly Simm (ENG)	5.300	7.666		12.966
7	Maisie Methuen (WAL)	4.800	7.975		12.775
8	Latalia Bevan (WAL)	4.600	5.900		10.500
