= Walter Kinsella =

Walter Kinsella may refer to:

- Walter Kinsella (tennis), American squash tennis and court tennis player
- Walter Kinsella (actor), American actor
