= Edward Kinsella =

Edward Kinsella may refer to:

- Ed Kinsella (Edward William "Rube" Kinsella, 1880–1976), Major League baseball player
- Edward M. Kinsella (1911–1973), New York politician
- Ted Kinsella (Edward Parnell Kinsella, 1893–1967), Australian politician and judge
