= John J. Kinsella =

Stained glass producer company in Chicago, US

The John J. Kinsella Company operated from 1872 to 1931 and was one of the larger firms producing stained glass and mirrors in Chicago at the time. They specialized in ecclesiastical stained glass art and employed some 50 people, according to the publication, Frueh's Chicago Stained Glass.

The stained-glass windows of St. James Ev. Lutheran Church at 2101 N Fremont, Chicago, were created in 1917. "St. James Lutheran Church has magnificent Kinsella windows of the Nativity, the Resurrection, and Gethsemane set in modified Gothic traceries and ornate perpendicular Gothic canopies. All are of exceptional technical and artistic merit, but the most outstanding for its balance of subject and color is the Gethsemane window. Especially moving is the kneeling figure of Christ seeking divine guidance, symbolized by the brilliant ray of light which shines down upon him." "A characteristic of this glass is that the panels are sometimes two and three panes thick to produce just the right hue and textures. This is especially true of the deep reds and blues. The memorial panels at the bottom of each window, in German, are a reminder that this parish, founded in 1869, was for many years a German-speaking congregation."

While the St. James Kinsella windows were under construction, the site was visited by Archbishop Mundelein and his building committee. "The new archbishop reportedly upbraided his committee for not placing this quality of glass in the Catholic churches being built in the city." "Mundelein soon afterwards commissioned the Kinsella Co. to do the windows in the St. James Chapel of Quigley Seminary on Rush and Pearson streets."

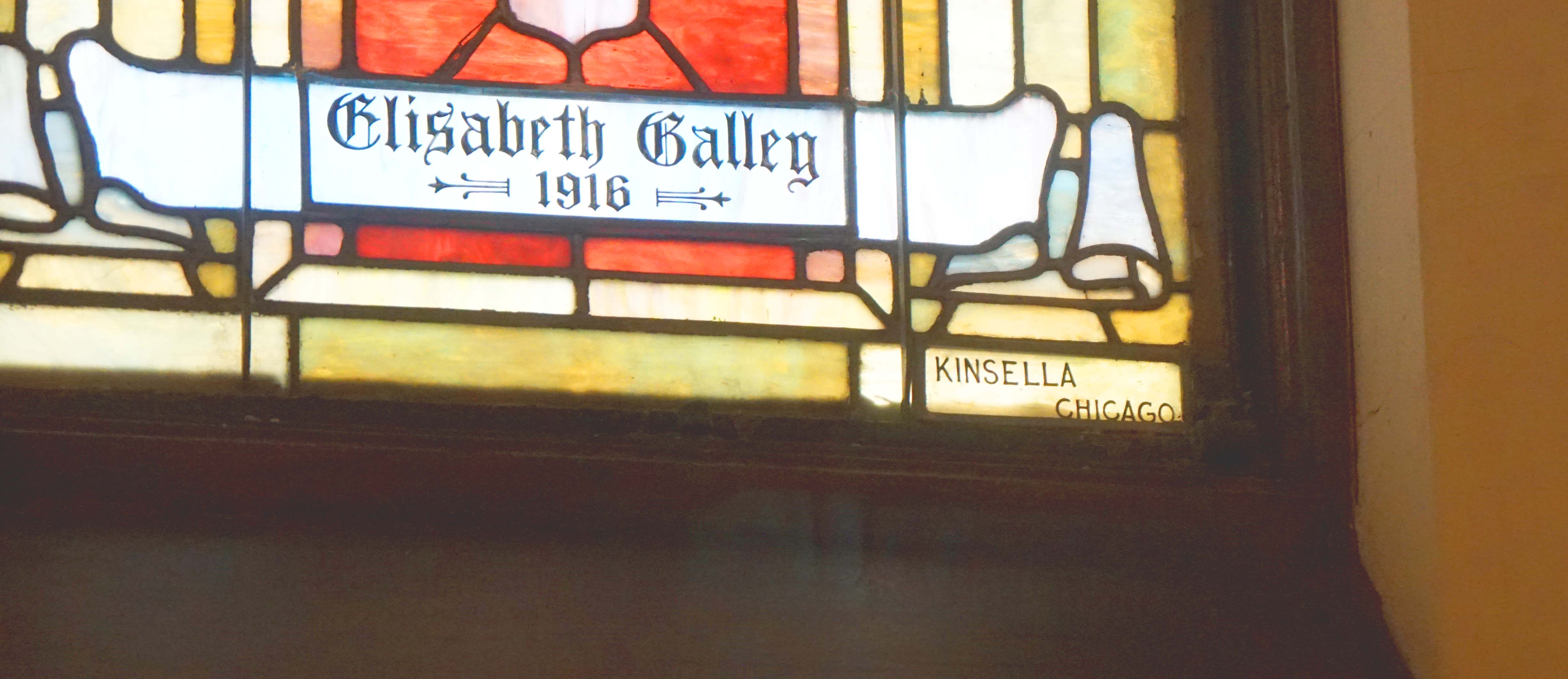
John J. Kinsella Company stained glass calling card. Location: St. James Ev. Lutheran Church, Chicago, IL.

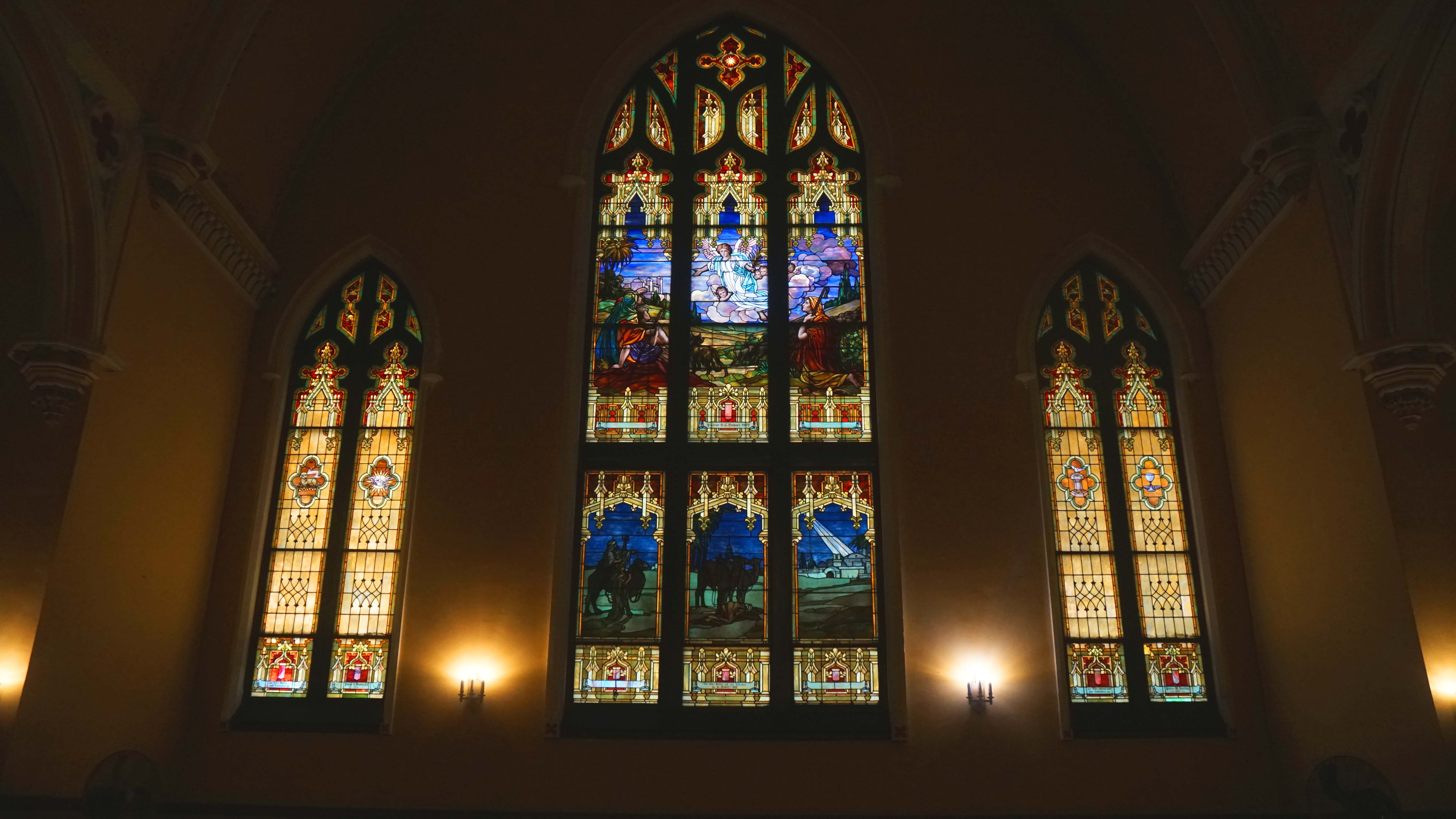
John J. Kinsella Nativity window at St. James Ev. Lutheran Church in Chicago

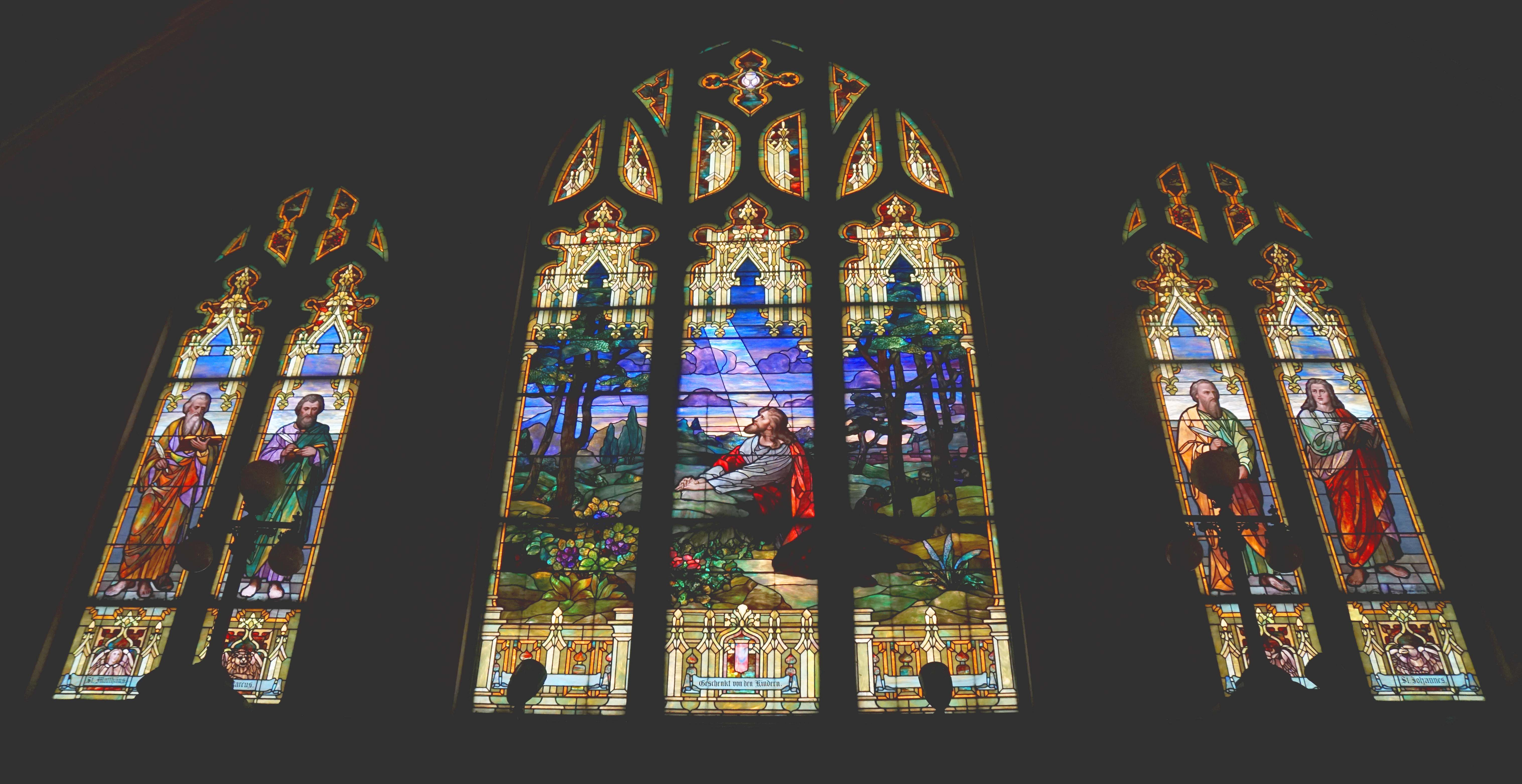
John J. Kinsella Gethsemane window at St. James Ev. Lutheran Church in Chicago

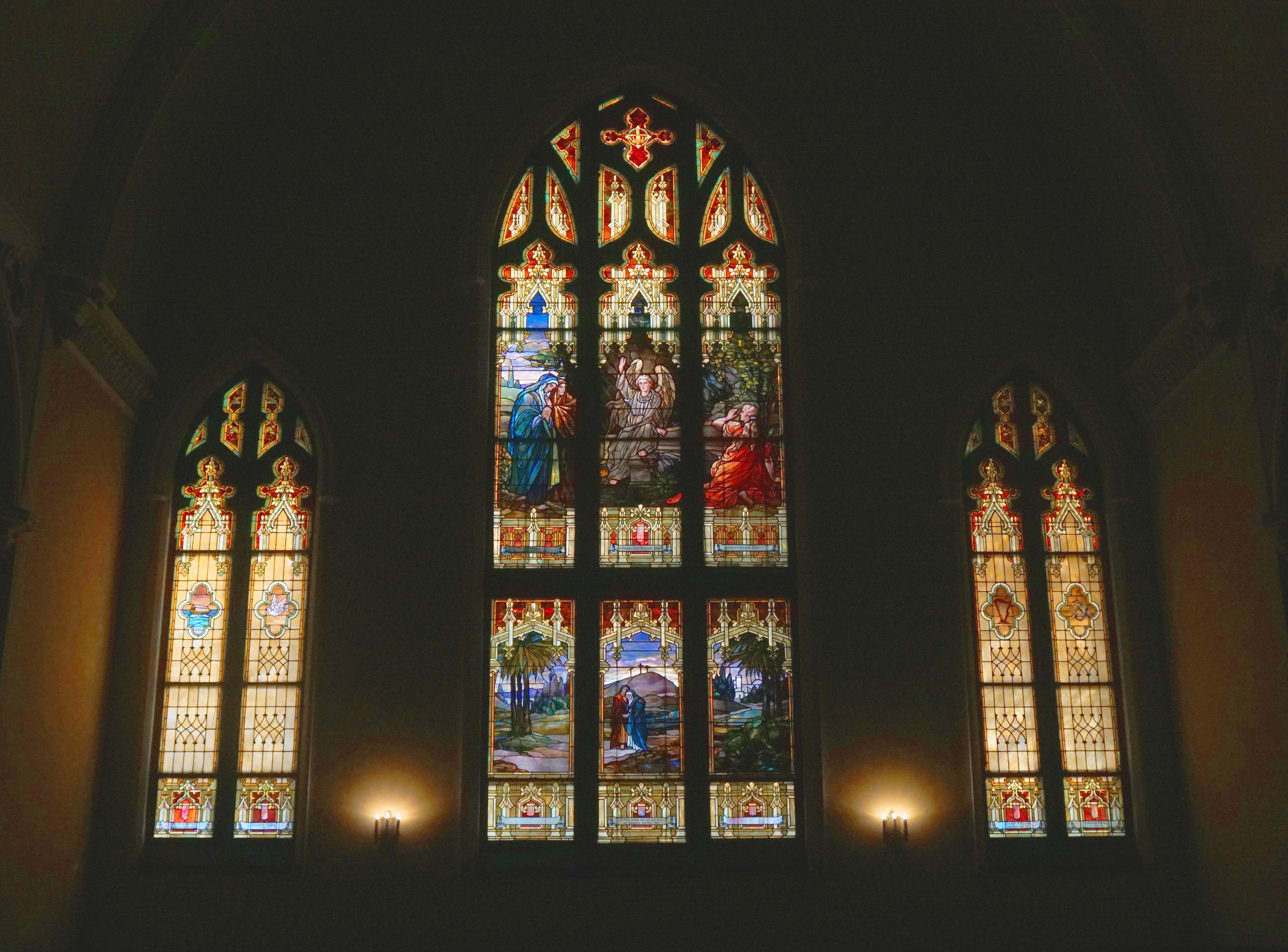
John J. Kinsella Resurrection Window at St. James Ev. Lutheran Church in Chicago

== Locations of Stained Glass ==
- Archbishop Quigley Preparatory Seminary, Chicago; St. James Chapel. Glass installed 1918-24
- Cathedral of St. John the Evangelist (Boise, Idaho)
- First Christian Church, Disciples of Christ, Valparaiso, Ind.
- St. Dennis Catholic Church, Lockport, Il.
- Saint Vincent Basilica, Latrobe, Pa. The three rose windows, installed ca. 1900.
- St. James Ev. Lutheran Church, 2101 N Fremont St. Chicago, Il. Glass installed 1916-17
- St. John Berchmanns, Chicago, Il. Glass installed 1921
- University of Saint Mary of the Lake, Chicago; Seminary Chapel
