= Claudia Fragapane =

British artistic gymnast

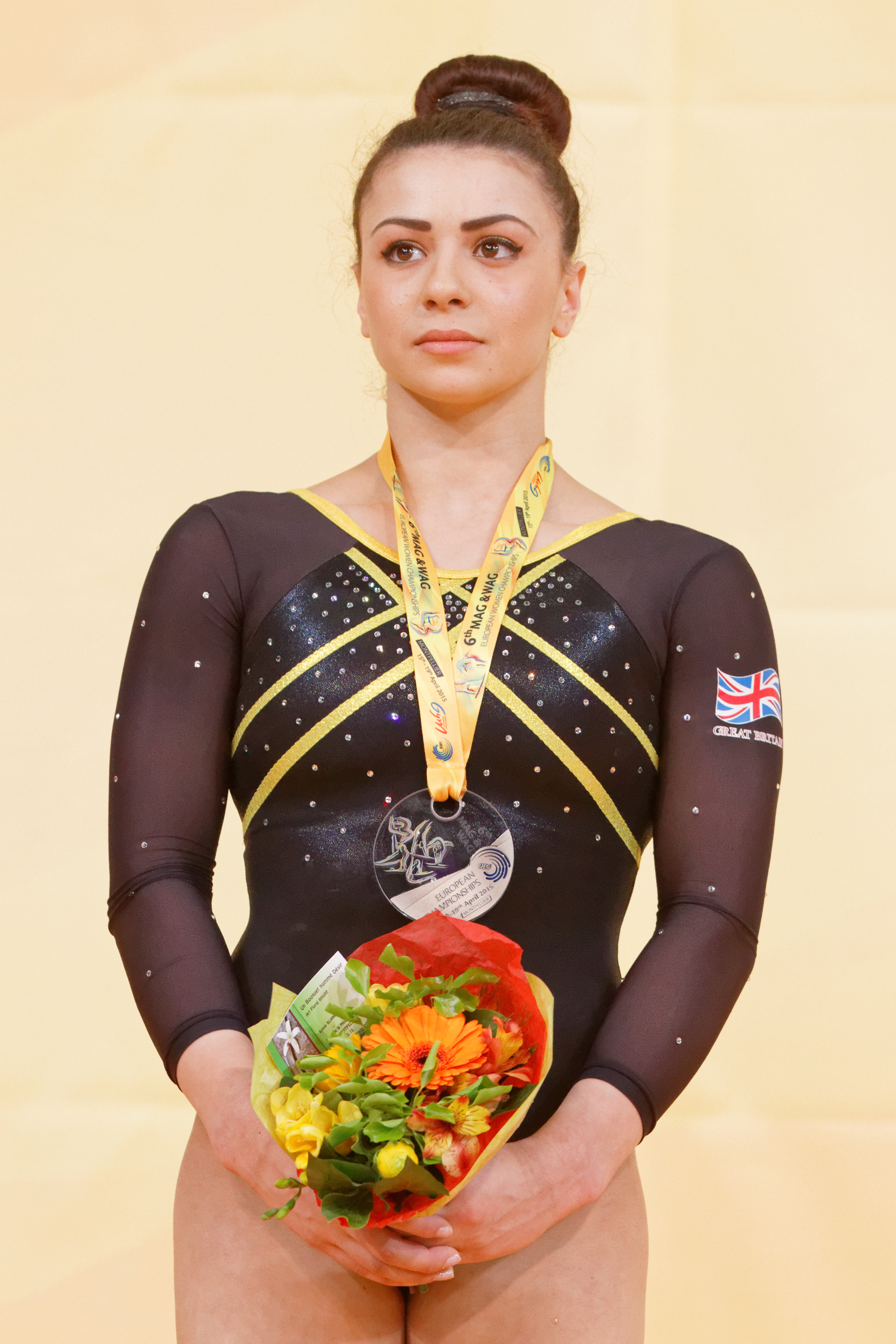
- Fragapane at the 2015 European Championships

Personal information
- Born: 24 October 1997 (age 28) Bristol, England
- Height: 140 cm (4 ft 7 in)

Gymnastics career
- Discipline: Women's artistic gymnastics
- Country represented: (United Kingdom) Great Britain England; (2011–2023)
- Club: Bristol Hawks Gymnastics Club
- Head coaches: Helen Potter, Rory Weavers
- Retired: 9 February 2024
Medal record
Representing Great Britain
World Championships
Bronze medal – third place	2015 Glasgow	Team
Bronze medal – third place	2017 Montreal	Floor Exercise
European Championships
Silver medal – second place	2014 Sofia	Team
Silver medal – second place	2015 Montpellier	Floor Exercise
Silver medal – second place	2016 Bern	Team
FIG World Cup
Event	1st	2nd	3rd
World Cup	0	0	1
World Challenge Cup	2	0	1
Representing England
Commonwealth Games
Gold medal – first place	2014 Glasgow	Team
Gold medal – first place	2014 Glasgow	All-Around
Gold medal – first place	2014 Glasgow	Vault
Gold medal – first place	2014 Glasgow	Floor Exercise
Gold medal – first place	2022 Birmingham	Team

Claudia Fragapane (born 24 October 1997) is a retired British artistic gymnast. She came to prominence at the 2014 Commonwealth Games, where she was the first English woman to win four gold medals in a single Games since 1930. In 2015, Fragapane was part of the women's gymnastics team that won Great Britain's first-ever team medal, a bronze, at the World Artistic Gymnastics Championships, before winning an individual world championship bronze on floor two years later, only the second individual female world medalist for Great Britain after Beth Tweddle.

She competed for Great Britain at the 2016 Summer Olympics in Rio de Janeiro. but failed to make any individual finals. She helped the Great Britain team to finish 5th in the team final. Following a series of injuries beginning with a serious Achilles tendon injury in 2018, which thereafter limited her international career, she returned to the England Commonwealth Games team in 2022, winning her fifth Commonwealth Games gold, her final senior international medal, in the women's team event.

Domestically, Fragapane is an eight-time English champion, and two-time British champion.

== Early life ==
Fragapane grew up in Bristol, where she attended St Bernadette Catholic Secondary School. She started gymnastics at age six.

== Senior career ==
=== 2014 ===
At the British national championships in 2014, Fragapane placed 2nd on vault with a score of 14.000, 5th on floor exercise (13.000), and 3rd on uneven bars (13.950). She finished third in the all-around competition with a total score of 55.700, and was selected to compete at the European Women's Artistic Gymnastics Championships in Sofia, Bulgaria.

At the European Championships, she contributed to Britain's silver-medal performance in the team competition. Individually, she qualified for the vault and floor exercise finals, finishing 6th and 8th, respectively, with scores of 14.333 (vault) and 14.133 (floor).

At the 2014 Commonwealth Games, Fragapane competed on all four events in the team final, where the English team won gold. She qualified first into the all-around final with a score of 56.740, more than a point and a half ahead of the second-place qualifier Ellie Black of Canada. She also qualified first on balance beam, vault, and floor. Fragapane won the individual all-around final with a score of 56.132, and the women's vault final with a score of 14.633. On 1 August, she won the floor final with a score of 14.541. With four gold medals in a single competition, Fragapane was England's most successful female Commonwealth Games competitor in over 80 years.

In October, Fragapane competed at the 2014 World Artistic Gymnastics Championships, where she helped the British women qualify into the team finals in 4th place. Individually, she qualified for the all-around in 13th place with a score of 55.999, despite a fall on the balance beam. She also qualified for the floor final in 6th place (14.400) and the vault final in 7th place (14.716).

In the team final, she contributed a vault score of 14.466 and a floor score of 14.533 towards the British team's 6th-place finish. In the individual all-around final, she placed 10th with a total score of 56.098. In the vault final, she scored 14.716 and tied for 5th place with Giulia Steingruber of Switzerland. In the floor final, a fall and a step out of bounds put her in 8th place with a score of 13.100.

After Fragapane's success in 2014, she was named BBC Young Sports Personality of the Year, edging out para-cyclist Sophie Thornhill and golfer Bradley Neil.

=== 2015 ===
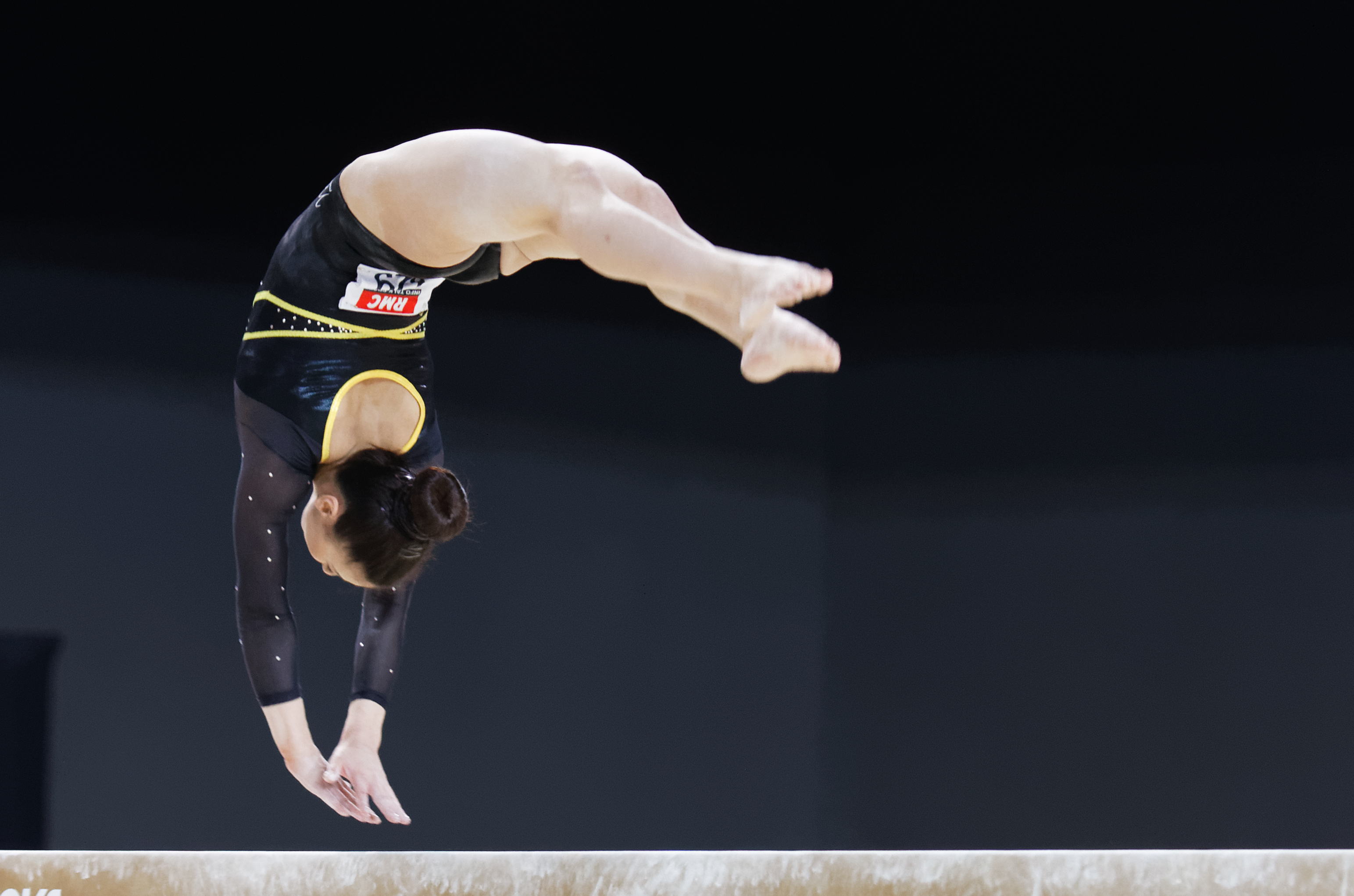
Fragapane on balance beam at the 2015 European Championships

Fragapane competed at the 2015 American Cup in Arlington, Texas. She struggled throughout the competition, counting numerous falls, and finished 9th. A week later, she competed at the English Artistic Gymnastics Championships in Loughborough, where she scored 54.900 all-around.

At the 2015 European Artistic Gymnastics Championships in Montpellier, France, Fragapane placed 6th in the all-around final, 6th in the vault final, 4th on the beam, and 2nd in the floor final, behind Ksenia Afanasyeva of Russia.

In October, Fragapane was part of the gymnastics team that won Great Britain's first-ever team medal, a bronze, at the World Artistic Gymnastics Championships.

=== 2016 ===
In March 2016, Fragapane won the all-around title and three event titles at the 2016 English Championships in Loughborough. This was followed up by winning the All-Around title at the British Championships in April, held at the Echo Arena in Liverpool. Fragapane won the title with a personal best score of 58.10, this was the highest All-Around score of any British woman in the 2012-2016 Olympic Cycle. In July, she was named in Great Britain's women's gymnastics team for the 2016 Summer Olympics in Rio de Janeiro, along with Becky Downie, Ellie Downie, Ruby Harrold, and Amy Tinkler.

At the Olympics, Fragapane fell on uneven bars and balance beam in the qualifications round and narrowly missed the cut for the individual all-around final. She also placed 8th on floor but missed out on a place in the final by the Olympic tie-breaking rules. Great Britain finished fifth in the team final.

=== 2017 ===
At the 2017 European Championships Fragapane qualified for the balance beam and floor finals, finishing 8th and 7th respectively.

Fragapane qualified in fourth for the floor final at the 2017 Artistic Gymnastics World Championships with a score of 13.933 before winning bronze in the final, her first individual medal at the championships, with the same score as in qualifying behind Mai Murakami of Japan, and Jade Carey of the US. She is Great Britain's second world championship medalist, after Beth Tweddle.

=== 2018 ===
Fragapane's season was cut short when, in March 2018, she sustained an Achilles injury.

=== 2019 ===
Fragapane made her comeback debut at the British Championships, where she only competed on uneven bars, balance beam, and floor exercise. In event finals she placed fourth on uneven bars and second on floor exercise behind Ellie Downie. On 19 March she was named to the team to compete at the 2019 European Championships, replacing Kelly Simm after she broke her foot. She competed alongside Downie, Alice Kinsella, and Amelie Morgan. During qualifications Fragapane finished first on floor exercise and advanced to the final. During the final she placed fifth.

=== 2021 ===
Fragapane was intending to compete at the 2021 European Championships in April; however, during trials she suffered from a head injury which resulted in a concussion. She returned to competition at the Koper World Challenge Cup where she won the gold on floor. In September Fragapane was selected to compete at the 2021 World Championships but had to withdraw after injuring her foot in training.

=== 2022 ===
In June Fragapane was selected to represent England at the 2022 Commonwealth Games alongside Ondine Achampong, Georgia-Mae Fenton, Alice Kinsella, and Kelly Simm. The group went on to win gold in the women's team all-around competition - Fragapane's fifth Commonwealth gold.

== Strictly Come Dancing ==
Fragapane participated in the 2016 series of the popular reality TV competition show Strictly Come Dancing. She was partnered with AJ Pritchard. The couple reached the semi-finals but were eliminated on 11 December 2016, thus finishing in 4th place overall.

Aged 18 at the time, Fragapane was the second youngest celebrity ever to participate, the youngest having been former EastEnders actress Louisa Lytton who was 17 when she competed in 2006. She is also the first female Olympic gymnast to compete on the show, the first gymnast having been Series 10 champion Louis Smith.

She also appeared on Take Me Out, series 10, episode 8, where she was a choosing contestant and went on a date.

== Competitive history ==
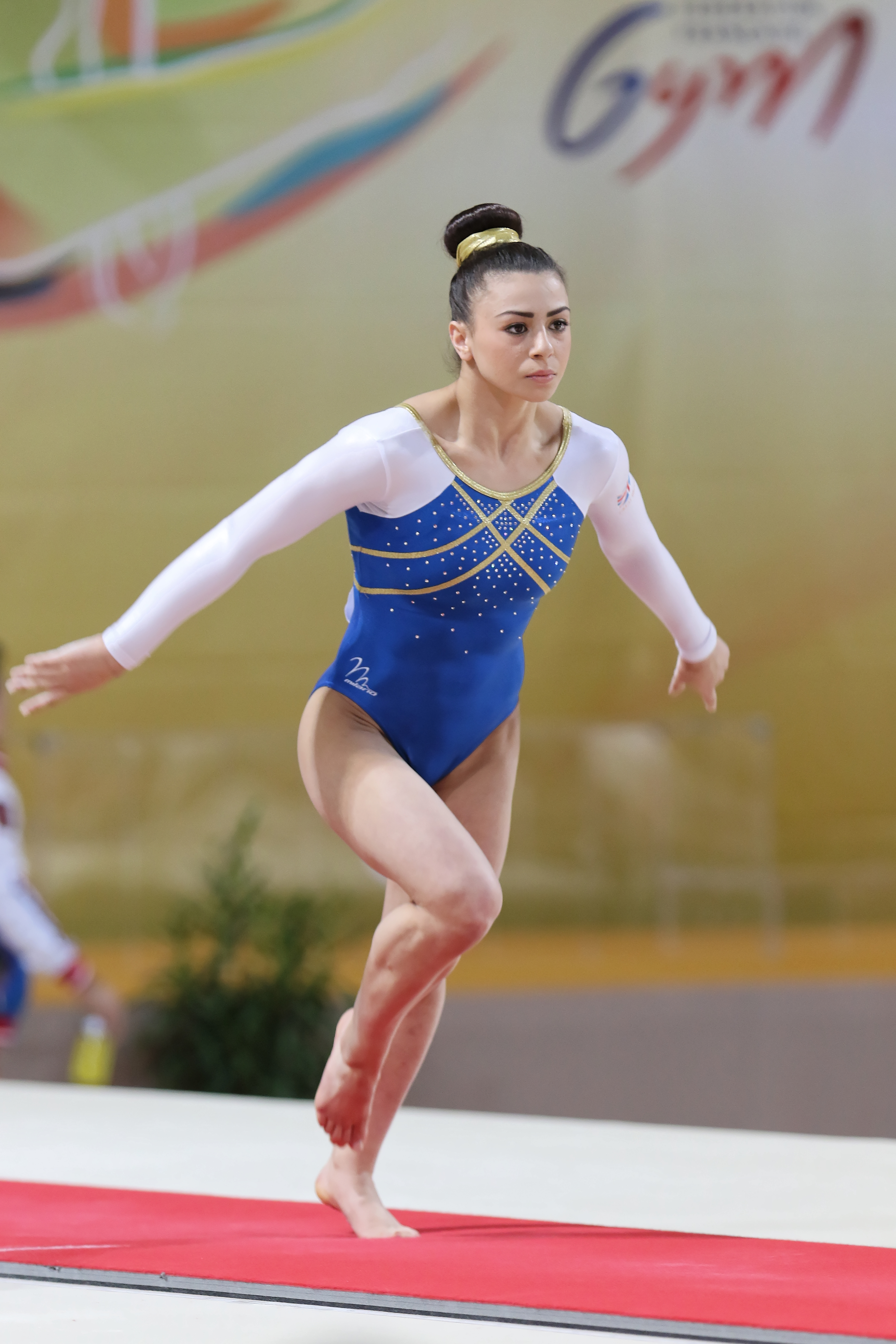
Fragapane on vault at the 2015 European Championships

Competitive history of Claudia Fragapane at the junior level
Year	Event	Team	AA	VT	UB	BB	FX
2011	English Championships		5	4		6	4
2011	British Championships		8	3rd place, bronze medalist(s)			6
2011	Isle of Man International	1st place, gold medalist(s)	1st place, gold medalist(s)				
2011	UK School Games	2nd place, silver medalist(s)	7			6	7
2012	Coupe Avenir	1st place, gold medalist(s)		1st place, gold medalist(s)			
2012	British Championships		5	2nd place, silver medalist(s)		4	5

Competitive history of Claudia Fragapane at the senior level
Year	Event	Team	AA	VT	UB	BB	FX
2013	Élite Gym Massilia	3rd place, bronze medalist(s)	6				5
2013	Gymnasiade	3rd place, bronze medalist(s)	7	5	7	6	5
2014	English Championships		3rd place, bronze medalist(s)	1st place, gold medalist(s)	4		4
2014	British Championships		3rd place, bronze medalist(s)	2nd place, silver medalist(s)	3rd place, bronze medalist(s)		5
2014	Munich Friendly	1st place, gold medalist(s)					
2014	GBR-NED International Friendly	1st place, gold medalist(s)	9				
2014	European Championships	2nd place, silver medalist(s)		6			8
2014	Commonwealth Games	1st place, gold medalist(s)	1st place, gold medalist(s)	1st place, gold medalist(s)		5	1st place, gold medalist(s)
2014	World Championships	6	10	5			8
2015	AT&T American Cup		9				
2015	English Championships		2nd place, silver medalist(s)	1st place, gold medalist(s)	2nd place, silver medalist(s)	3rd place, bronze medalist(s)	4
2015	British Championships		2nd place, silver medalist(s)	1st place, gold medalist(s)	3rd place, bronze medalist(s)	3rd place, bronze medalist(s)	2nd place, silver medalist(s)
2015	European Championships		6	6		4	2nd place, silver medalist(s)
2015	GBR-NED International Friendly	1st place, gold medalist(s)					
2015	World Championships	3rd place, bronze medalist(s)					7
2016	Glasgow World Cup		3rd place, bronze medalist(s)				
2016	English Championships		1st place, gold medalist(s)	2nd place, silver medalist(s)	1st place, gold medalist(s)	1st place, gold medalist(s)	1st place, gold medalist(s)
2016	British Championships		1st place, gold medalist(s)	2nd place, silver medalist(s)		2nd place, silver medalist(s)	2nd place, silver medalist(s)
2016	European Championships	2nd place, silver medalist(s)		5			4
2016	Olympic Games	5					
2017	British Championships						2nd place, silver medalist(s)
2017	English Championships					1st place, gold medalist(s)	1st place, gold medalist(s)
2017	European Championships					8	7
2017	World Championships						3rd place, bronze medalist(s)
2018	English Championships		2nd place, silver medalist(s)				
2019	British Championships				4		2nd place, silver medalist(s)
2019	European Championships						5
2021	Koper Challenge Cup						1st place, gold medalist(s)
2022
2022	Commonwealth Games	1st place, gold medalist(s)					
