= Georgia Godwin =

Australian artistic gymnast

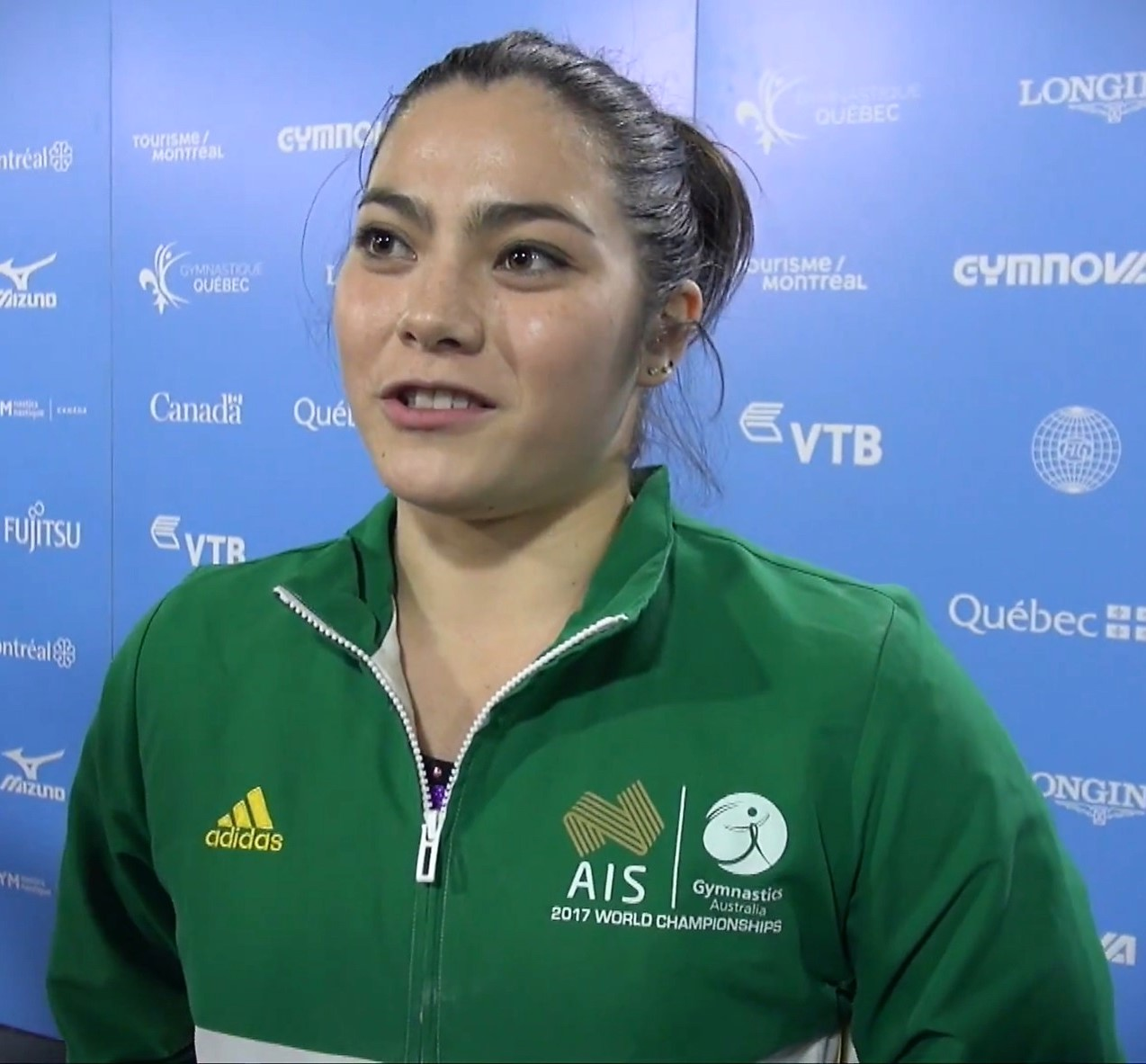
- Godwin at the 2017 World Championships

Personal information
- Born: 28 October 1997 (age 28) Southport, Queensland, Australia
- Height: 154 cm (5 ft 1 in)

Gymnastics career
- Discipline: Women's artistic gymnastics
- Country represented: Australia (2014–present)
- Club: All The Way Up Gymnastics; Gymnastics Australia National Training Centre, Canberra
- Head coach: Josh Fabian
Medal record
Representing Australia
Commonwealth Games
Gold medal – first place	2022 Birmingham	All-around
Gold medal – first place	2022 Birmingham	Vault
Gold medal – first place	2026 Glasgow	Team
Silver medal – second place	2018 Gold Coast	All-around
Silver medal – second place	2022 Birmingham	Team
Silver medal – second place	2022 Birmingham	Uneven Bars
Silver medal – second place	2022 Birmingham	Balance Beam
Bronze medal – third place	2018 Gold Coast	Team
Bronze medal – third place	2018 Gold Coast	Uneven bars
FIG World Cup
Event	1st	2nd	3rd
World Cup	0	2	0
World Challenge Cup	5	3	0
Total	5	5	0

Georgia Godwin (born 28 October 1997) is an Australian artistic gymnast. She is the 2022 Commonwealth Games all-around and vault champion and the team, uneven bars and balance beam silver-medalist. She is also the 2018 Commonwealth Games all-around silver medalist and the team and uneven bars bronze medalist. She represented Australia at the 2020 Summer Olympics and was the third reserve for the all-around final. She is also a two-time World Cup silver medalist.

== Early life ==
Georgia Godwin was born on 28 October 1997 in Southport, Queensland. She has Japanese heritage on her mother's side of the family. She began gymnastics when she was three years old, and was also involved in tennis and athletics as a child.

== Career ==
Godwin won the all-around titles at both the 2011 and 2012 Junior Australian Championships. She made her senior debut at the 2013 Australian Championships and finished third in the all-around, second on vault, fifth on the uneven bars, fourth on the balance beam, and first on the floor exercise. She then made her international debut at the 2014 Nadia Comaneci Invitational and won the gold medal in the all-around and with the team. She then competed at the 2014 City of Jesolo Trophy and finished fourth with the team and twenty-fourth in the all-around. She then won the gold medal in the all-around at the 2014 Australian Championships. In the event finals, she finished third on the vault, sixth on the uneven bars, seventh on the balance beam, and second on the floor exercise. Her final competition of the 2014 season was the Élite Gym Massilia where she finished sixteenth in the all-around and sixth in the balance beam final.

=== 2015–2016 ===
Godwin defended her all-around title at the 2015 Australian Championships, and she also finished fourth on vault, third on the uneven bars, first on the balance beam, and sixth on the floor exercise. She was selected to compete at the 2015 World Championships alongside Madelaine Leydin, Emily Little, Larrissa Miller, Mary-Anne Monckton, and Kiara Munteanu, and they finished fourteenth in the qualification round.

At the 2016 Australian Championships, Godwin helped the Queensland team win the bronze medal. She then finished sixth in the all-around final. In the event finals, she won the bronze medal on the uneven bars behind Rianna Mizzen and Emily Whitehead, and she finished sixth on the balance beam and the floor exercise. Then at the 2016 Élite Gym Massilia, she finished fifth on the floor exercise.

=== 2017–2018 ===
At the 2017 Melbourne World Cup, Godwin won the silver medal on the floor exercise behind Emily Little. Then at the 2017 World Championships, she qualified for the all-around final and finished thirteenth. She then competed at the 2017 Toyota International and finished seventh on the vault and uneven bars, tenth on the balance beam, and sixth on the floor exercise.

Godwin finished fourth on the vault at the 2018 Melbourne World Cup. She was selected to represent Australia at the 2018 Commonwealth Games alongside Georgia-Rose Brown, Alexandra Eade, Rianna Mizzen, and Emily Whitehead, and they won the bronze medal in the team event behind England and Canada. In the all-around final, Godwin won the silver medal behind Ellie Black. She then finished sixth in the vault final, and she won the bronze medal on the uneven bars behind Georgia-Mae Fenton and Brittany Rogers. Then at the 2018 Australian Championships, she won the gold medal in the all-around, on uneven bars, balance beam, and floor exercise, and she won the silver medal on vault.

=== 2019 ===
Godwin defended her all-around title at the Australian Championships, and she won the gold medals on vault and floor exercise, and she won the silver medal on the uneven bars. Then at the FIT Challenge in Ghent, she won the bronze medal in the all-around behind Naomi Visser and Nina Derwael and the Australian team won the silver medal behind the Netherlands. She won the gold medal in the all-around and on vault and floor exercise at the Australian Classic, and she also won the silver medals on the uneven bars and balance beam. She was then selected to compete at the World Championships alongside Georgia-Rose Brown, Talia Folino, Kate McDonald, and Emma Nedov, and they finished thirteenth. The team missed a team quota for the 2020 Olympics by one spot, but Godwin qualified for an individual spot because she finished in the top twenty of the eligible athletes. She finished nineteenth in the all-around final. After the World Championships, she competed at the Toyota International and finished fourth on vault and balance beam and sixth on uneven bars, and she won the silver medal on the floor exercise behind Lilia Akhaimova.

=== 2020–2022 ===
At the 2020 Melbourne World Cup, Godwin won the silver medal on the uneven bars behind Ukrainian gymnast Diana Varinska. She also placed fourth on the balance beam and seventh on the floor exercise. She then competed at the 2020 American Cup and finished sixth in the all-around. She was initially scheduled to compete at the 2020 Tokyo World Cup; however, the event was canceled due to the COVID-19 pandemic in Japan.

Godwin swept the gold medals at the 2021 Australian National Championships. At the 2020 Olympic Games, she finished thirty-seventh in the all-around during the qualification round with a total score of 52.865, and she was the third reserve for the all-around final.

Godwin competed at the 2022 Commonwealth Games in Birmingham, where she won gold medals in the artistic individual all-around and vault and silver medals in the artistic team all-around, uneven bars and balance beam.

=== 2023 ===
At the Tel Aviv World Challenge Cup, Godwin won gold on vault and floor exercise, as well as silver on the uneven bars. Additionally, she debuted a new element on the uneven bars, a Weiler-kip with full turn, which was named after her in the Code of Points. Godwin next competed at the Osijek World Challenge Cup, where she won gold on vault, balance beam and floor exercise as well as silver on uneven bars behind Naomi Visser. At the Paris World Challenge Cup, Godwin took the silver medal in the vault final behind Alexa Moreno. Additionally, she finished fifth in both the uneven bars and balance beam finals.

In November she had a gymnastics move officially named after her.

=== 2024 ===
In May, Godwin sustained an Achilles injury and would be unable to compete at the 2024 Olympic Games.

== Eponymous skill ==
Godwin has one eponymous skill listed in the Code of Points.

Apparatus	Name	Description	Difficulty (Note: Valid for the 2025–2028 Code of Points)	Added to Code of Points
Uneven bars	Godwin	Clear hip circle forward to handstand with 1/1 turn (360°) in handstand phase	E	2023 Tel Aviv World Challenge Cup

== Competitive history ==
Competitive history of Georgia Godwin
Year	Event	Team	AA	VT	UB	BB	FX
2011	Junior Australian Championships		1st place, gold medalist(s)	4	6	2nd place, silver medalist(s)	1st place, gold medalist(s)
2012	Junior Australian Championships	1st place, gold medalist(s)	1st place, gold medalist(s)	1st place, gold medalist(s)	3rd place, bronze medalist(s)	1st place, gold medalist(s)	2nd place, silver medalist(s)
2013	Australian Championships		3rd place, bronze medalist(s)	2nd place, silver medalist(s)	5	4	1st place, gold medalist(s)
2014	Nadia Comaneci Invitational	1st place, gold medalist(s)	1st place, gold medalist(s)				
2014	City of Jesolo Trophy	4	24				
2014	Australian Championships		1st place, gold medalist(s)	3rd place, bronze medalist(s)	6	7	2nd place, silver medalist(s)
2014	Élite Gym Massilia		16			6	
2015	Australian Championships		1st place, gold medalist(s)	4	3rd place, bronze medalist(s)	1st place, gold medalist(s)	6
2015	World Championships	14					
2016	Australian Championships	3rd place, bronze medalist(s)	6		3rd place, bronze medalist(s)	6	6
2016	Élite Gym Massilia						5
2017	Melbourne World Cup						2nd place, silver medalist(s)
2017	World Championships		13				
2017	Toyota International			7	7	10	6
2018	Melbourne World Cup			4			
2018	Commonwealth Games	3rd place, bronze medalist(s)	2nd place, silver medalist(s)	6	3rd place, bronze medalist(s)		
2018	Australian Championships		1st place, gold medalist(s)	2nd place, silver medalist(s)	1st place, gold medalist(s)	1st place, gold medalist(s)	1st place, gold medalist(s)
2019	Australian Championships		1st place, gold medalist(s)	1st place, gold medalist(s)	2nd place, silver medalist(s)		1st place, gold medalist(s)
2019	FIT Challenge	2nd place, silver medalist(s)	3rd place, bronze medalist(s)				
2019	Australian Classic		1st place, gold medalist(s)	1st place, gold medalist(s)	2nd place, silver medalist(s)	2nd place, silver medalist(s)	1st place, gold medalist(s)
2019	World Championships	13	19				
2019	Toyota International			4	6	4	2nd place, silver medalist(s)
2020	Melbourne World Cup				2nd place, silver medalist(s)		
2020	American Cup		6				
2021	Australian Championships		1st place, gold medalist(s)	1st place, gold medalist(s)	1st place, gold medalist(s)	1st place, gold medalist(s)	1st place, gold medalist(s)
2021	Olympic Games		R3				
2022
2022	Commonwealth Games	2nd place, silver medalist(s)	1st place, gold medalist(s)	1st place, gold medalist(s)	2nd place, silver medalist(s)	2nd place, silver medalist(s)	
2022	World Championships	R2	12				
2023	Australian Championships		1st place, gold medalist(s)	1st place, gold medalist(s)	3rd place, bronze medalist(s)	1st place, gold medalist(s)	1st place, gold medalist(s)
2023	Tel Aviv World Challenge Cup			1st place, gold medalist(s)	2nd place, silver medalist(s)	4	1st place, gold medalist(s)
2023	Osijek World Challenge Cup			1st place, gold medalist(s)	2nd place, silver medalist(s)	1st place, gold medalist(s)	1st place, gold medalist(s)
2023	Paris World Challenge Cup			2nd place, silver medalist(s)	5	5	
2023	World Championships	9	20				
2024	DTB Pokal Team Challenge	2nd place, silver medalist(s)		4		2nd place, silver medalist(s)	1st place, gold medalist(s)
2026
2026	Commonwealth Games	1st place, gold medalist(s)	5	6			7
