= Pat Kinsella =

English footballer

Personal information
- Full name: Patrick Gerard Kinsella
- Date of birth: 8 November 1943 (age 82)
- Place of birth: Liverpool, England
- Position: Midfielder

Youth career
- Liverpool

Senior career*
Years	Team	Apps	(Gls)
- Bangor City
1966–1967	Tranmere Rovers	1	(0)
1967	Wrexham	0	(0)
1967–1968	Rhyl		
	Stockport County	12	(1)
Total			(1)
- * Club domestic league appearances and goals

Pat Kinsella (born 8 November 1943) is an English footballer, who played as a midfielder in the Football League for Tranmere Rovers and Stockport County. He also appeared in the EFL Cup for Wrexham.
