= James Kinsella =

James Kinsella may refer to:

- James Kinsella (mayor)
- James Kinsella (entrepreneur)
- Jim Kinsella, Scottish footballer
- Jimmy Kinsella, Irish golfer
