= Alice Kinsella =

British artistic gymnast (born 2001)

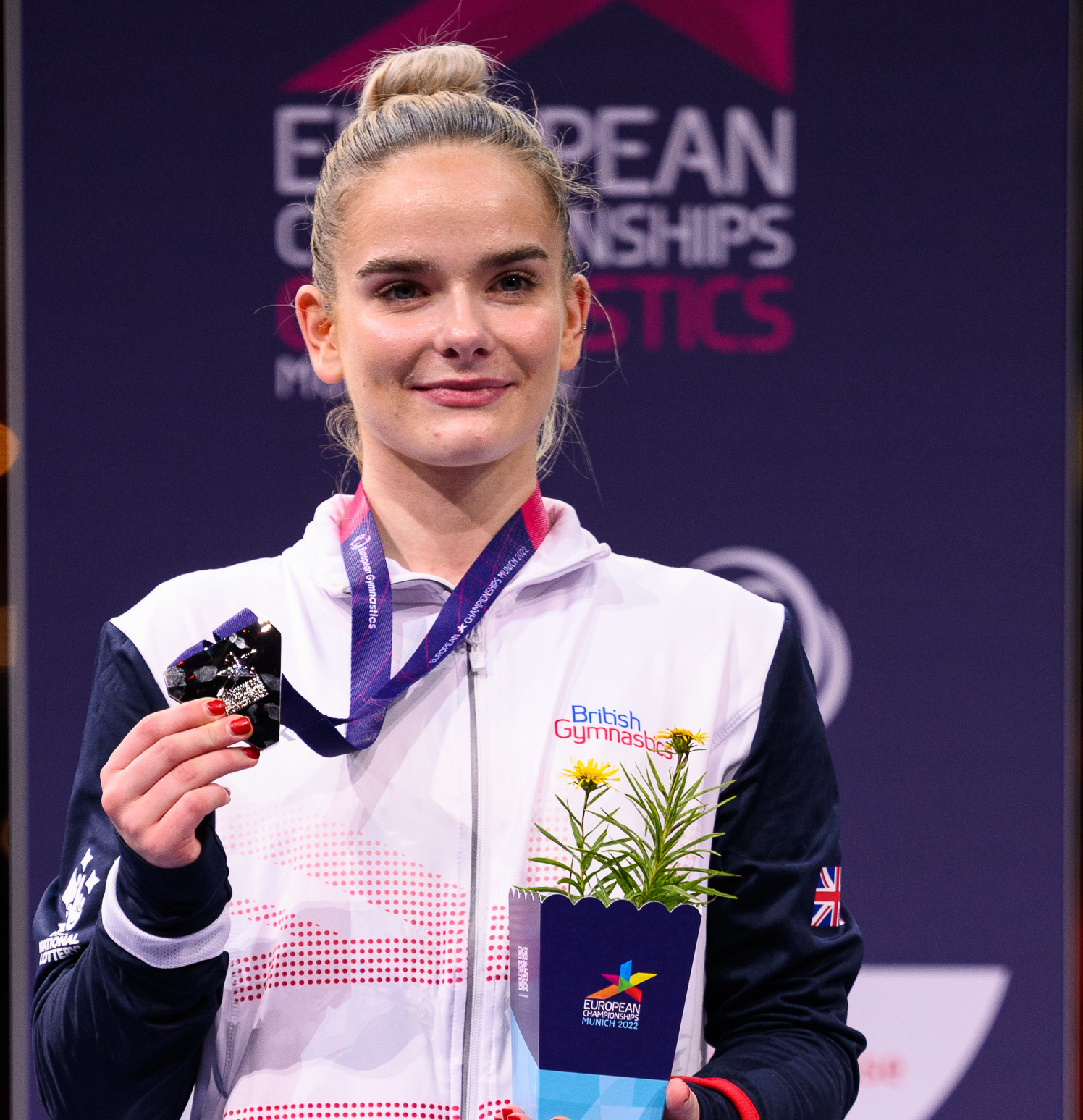
- Kinsella at the 2022 European Championships

Personal information
- Full name: Alice Nicole Kinsella
- Born: 13 March 2001 (age 25) Basildon, Essex, England
- Height: 157 cm (5 ft 2 in)
- Spouse: Will Lavin (m. 2026)
- Relatives: Mark Kinsella (father); Liam Kinsella (brother)

Gymnastics career
- Discipline: Women's artistic gymnastics
- Country represented: (United Kingdom) Great Britain England; (2015–present)
- Club: Park Wrekin Gymnastics Club
Medal record
Women's artistic gymnastics
Representing Great Britain
Olympic Games
Bronze medal – third place	2020 Tokyo	Team
World Championships
Silver medal – second place	2022 Liverpool	Team
European Championships
Gold medal – first place	2019 Szczecin	Balance Beam
Gold medal – first place	2023 Antalya	Team
Silver medal – second place	2022 Munich	Team
Silver medal – second place	2022 Munich	All-Around
Silver medal – second place	2023 Antalya	Floor Exercise
Silver medal – second place	2024 Rimini	Team
Bronze medal – third place	2024 Rimini	All-Around
FIG World Cup
Event / 1st / 2nd / 3rd; All-Around World Cup / 0 / 0 / 1
Representing England
Commonwealth Games
Gold medal – first place	2018 Gold Coast	Balance Beam
Gold medal – first place	2022 Birmingham	Team
Gold medal – first place	2022 Birmingham	Floor Exercise
Silver medal – second place	2018 Gold Coast	Team
Bronze medal – third place	2018 Gold Coast	All-Around

Alice Nicole Lavin (née Kinsella; born 13 March 2001) is an English artistic gymnast and member of the British national team. She represented Great Britain at the 2020 Summer Olympics, winning a bronze medal in the team event. Kinsella was also part of the British squad which achieved a record silver medal in the team event at the 2022 World Championships and gold at the 2023 European Championships. She won a Commonwealth Games title as part of England's gold-winning team all-around squad of 2022.

Individually, she is the 2018 Commonwealth Games and 2019 European champion on the balance beam, and the 2022 Commonwealth Games champion on floor.

Domestically, Kinsella was the 2023 British national all-around champion.

== Early career ==
Kinsella first started gymnastics at Tamworth Olympic Gymnastics Club. She then moved to Park Wrekin Gymnastics Club in Wellington, Shropshire and has continued training there since.

== Senior career ==
=== 2017 ===
Her senior debut came in March 2017 where she finished seventh in the 2017 Stuttgart World Cup. She competed at the 2017 European Artistic Gymnastics Championships in Cluj-Napoca, Romania where she placed tenth in the all-around.

In October 2017, Alice was chosen to represent Great Britain at the 2017 Artistic Gymnastics World Championships in Montreal, Quebec, Canada. She competed in the all-around in qualifications and placed twenty-fourth overall, qualifying her to the all-around final with a score of 51.365. On 6 October 2017, British Gymnastics announced that Alice had withdrawn from the all-around final after sustaining a minor ankle injury during qualifications.

=== 2018 ===
On 10 February, Alice competed at the English Championships where she placed seventh in the all-around. She also placed fourth on vault and bars and sixth on floor. On 21 February, Alice was named to the English team for the 2018 Commonwealth Games in Gold Coast, Australia.

In March, Alice competed at the British Championships. She competed in the all-around where she placed fifth with a score of 51.650. She then competed in the beam final where she won a silver medal with a score of 13.350 and also in the floor final where she placed fifth with a score of 13.000. Later on that month, Alice was chosen to compete at the Artistic Gymnastics World Cup in Birmingham to replace teammate Claudia Fragapane who had to withdraw due to injury. She won the bronze medal with a total score of 53.099 behind Russia's Angelina Melnikova and American Margzetta Frazier.

In April Kinsella competed at the Commonwealth Games on all four events in the team final/individual qualifications where she won a silver medal with the English team, finishing behind Canada. She had also qualified in third for the all-around final, second for the beam final and sixth for the floor final. In the all-around final, Alice won bronze with a total score of 53.150 behind gold medal winner Ellie Black from Canada and silver medal winner Georgia Godwin from Australia. Alice competed in the beam final where she won gold with a score of 13.700. She told the BBC after her win:

"I'm still quite speechless. I don't really know what to say. I went out quite confident because I came second in qualifications. I thought if I go clean a medal was possible. But when I got the gold I didn't know what to do."

Alice then competed in the floor final where she placed eighth after falling on her final tumble. She scored 11.666.

On 7–8 July Kinsella competed at the Heerenveen Friendly where she placed third in the team final with Great Britain, second on balance beam behind Sanne Wevers, 4th on floor, and 10th in the all-around after a fall on the beam. On 6 July Kinsella was named to the team to compete at the 2018 European Championships alongside Becky Downie, Georgia-Mae Fenton, Kelly Simm, and Lucy Stanhope. Great Britain finished fourth in team finals.

On September 27, Kinsella was named to the team to compete at the World Championships in Doha, Qatar alongside Becky Downie, Ellie Downie, Georgia-Mae Fenton, and Kelly Simm. Great Britain finished ninth in qualifications and was the first reserve for team finals.

=== 2019 ===
In March, Kinsella competed at the English Championships where she placed third in the all-around behind Amelie Morgan and Kelly Simm. She was later selected to compete at the 2019 European Championships alongside Ellie Downie, Morgan, and Simm. At the British Championships, Kinsella placed fourth in the all-around, second on uneven bars, fourth on balance beam, and fifth on floor exercise. At the European Championships, Kinsella qualified to the all-around final in third place behind Angelina Melnikova and Mélanie de Jesus dos Santos. She additionally qualified to the balance beam final in third and the floor exercise final in seventh. In the all-around final Kinsella finished fifteenth. During event finals she won gold on the balance beam making her the first British gymnast to become a European champion on the apparatus. She later placed seventh in the floor exercise final.

In September, Kinsella competed at the British Team Championships where she placed second in the all-around behind Kelly Simm and helped her club, Park Wreckin, place second. Later that month Kinsella was named to the team to compete at the 2019 World Championships in Stuttgart alongside Ellie Downie, Becky Downie, Taeja James, and Georgia-Mae Fenton. During qualifications Kinsella helped Great Britain place seventh, earning a spot in the team final and qualifying a team for Great Britain to the 2020 Olympic Games in Tokyo. Individually she qualified to the all-around final. During the team final she contributed scores on vault, balance beam, and floor exercise towards Great Britain's sixth-place finish. In the all-around final Kinsella finished in twelfth place.

=== 2020–2021 ===
In early February it was announced that Kinsella was selected to represent Great Britain at the Birmingham World Cup taking place in late March. However, the Birmingham World Cup was later canceled due to the COVID-19 pandemic in the United Kingdom.

In April 2021 Kinsella was selected to represent Great Britain at the European Championships alongside Jessica Gadirova, Jennifer Gadirova (later replaced by Phoebe Jakubczyk), and Amelie Morgan.

On 7 June 2021, Kinsella was selected to represent Great Britain at the 2020 Summer Olympics alongside Jessica Gadirova, Jennifer Gadirova, and Amelie Morgan. During qualifications Kinsella suffered multiple mishaps and did not qualify for any individual event finals; however Great Britain qualified for the team final. During the team final Kinsella performed on all four apparatuses, hitting all of her routines and helping Great Britain win the bronze medal, their first Olympic team medal in 93 years.

In July 2021, Kinsella became an official ambassador for the gymnastics leotard brand Milano Pro-Sport. Outside of gymnastics, she was one of a number of Olympians to appear on CBBC's Saturday Mash Up. Kinsella was gunged with 20 buckets of slime after losing a public vote.

=== 2022 ===
Kinsella competed at the English and British championships where she finished second and fifth respectively. In June she was selected to represent England at the 2022 Commonwealth Games alongside Ondine Achampong, Georgia-Mae Fenton, Claudia Fragapane, and Kelly Simm. Kinsella was also selected to compete at the European Championships alongside Achampong, Fenton, and Olympic teammates Jennifer and Jessica Gadirova.

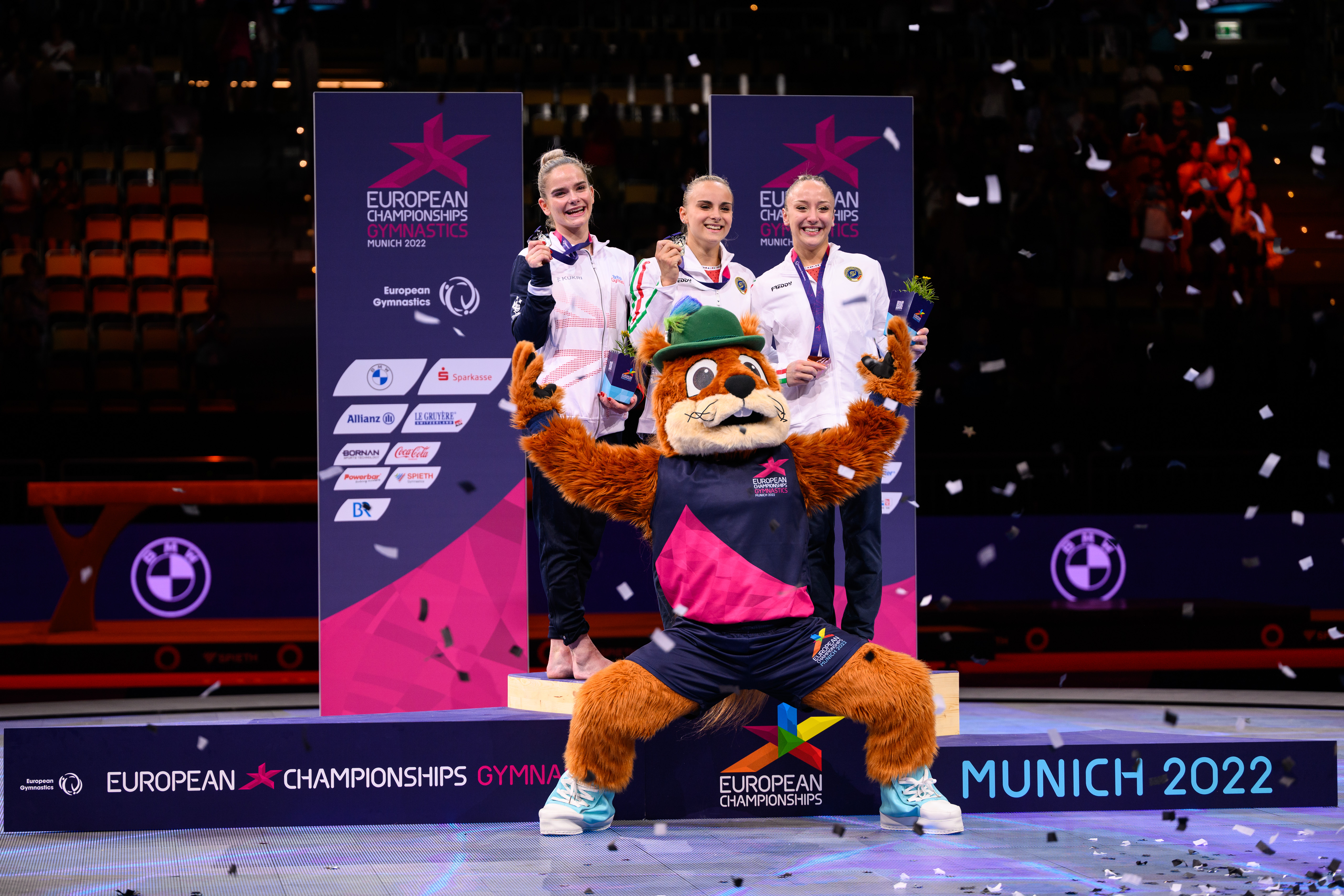
Kinsella (left) on the all-around podium at the 2022 European Championships

At the Commonwealth Games Kinsella led the English team to gold during the women's team final. Individually she qualified to the all-around, balance beam, and floor exercise finals. During the all-around final Kinsella fell off the balance beam and suffered mistakes on floor exercise resulting in a fourth-place finish. Additionally she finished fourth in the balance beam final before going on to win gold on floor exercise.

On the first day of competition at the European Championships Kinsella won silver in the all-around behind Asia D'Amato of Italy. Additionally, she helped Great Britain qualify for the team final in second place, and individually she qualified for the uneven bars final. During the team final Kinsella contributed scores on all four apparatuses towards Great Britain's second-place finish. During event finals Kinsella finished eighth on uneven bars.

In September Kinsella was named to the team to compete at the 2022 World Championships, once again alongside the Gadirova twins, Achampong, and Fenton. She qualified for the All-Around final, after finishing fourteenth in the qualification round. During the team final, Kinsella competed on all four apparatuses, helping Great Britain win the silver medal and achieve their highest placement at a World Championships. In the all-around final, Kinsella finished fourth, just behind teammate Jessica Gadirova who won bronze. Together they achieved the two highest finishes in history for a British female gymnast in a global (World or Olympic) all-around final.

=== 2023 ===
Kinsella competed at the English Championships where she placed first on uneven bars and balance beam. She next competed at the Welsh Championships she placed sixth on uneven bars, ninth on balance beam, and seventh on floor exercise. Kinsella was named to the team to compete at the upcoming European Championships alongside Becky Downie, Georgia-Mae Fenton, Jessica Gadirova, and Ondine Achampong. At the British championships she placed first in the all-around, on balance beam, and on floor exercise. At the European Championships Kinsella helped Great Britain win their first team gold medal. Additionally she placed sixth in the all-around during qualifications after falling off the uneven bars; however she did not advance to the final due to teammates Gadirova and Fenton placing higher. She did, however, qualify to the floor exercise final. During the floor exercise final Kinsella won silver behind compatriot Gadirova.

In September Kinsella was selected to represent Great Britain at the 2023 World Championships alongside Gadirova, Achampong, Fenton, and Ruby Evans. While there, she helped the team qualify in second to the team final. Individually Kinsella was the third highest placing British all-arounder and therefore did not qualify to the final due to two-per-country limitations. Additionally she was the first reserve for the floor exercise final. During the team final Kinsella contributed scores on uneven bars and floor exercise towards Great Britain's sixth-place finish. During warm-ups for the all-around final, Gadirova injured her knee and withdrew and Kinsella was substituted in. Despite being a last minute replacement, Kinsella performed four clean routines and finished seventh. In addition to the all-around final, Kinsella also replaced Gadirova in the floor exercise final, which was Kinsella's first ever World apparatus event final. During the final she finished eighth.

=== 2024 ===
Kinsella competed at Welsh Championships, finishing first on uneven bars and balance beam, and second on floor exercise. At English Championships, she finished second in the all-around, as well as first on the uneven bars and floor exercise. She was named to the European Championships team, alongside Ondine Achampong (later replaced by Abigail Martin), Ruby Evans, Becky Downie, and Georgia-Mae Fenton. In the all-around competition, which ran conterminously with team and apparatus qualification, she finished in fourth place, but was awarded the bronze medal as the third-place finisher was excluded on the two-per-nation rule.

In June, Kinsella was selected to represent Great Britain at the 2024 Summer Olympics alongside Downie, Evans, Fenton, and Martin. During qualifications at the Olympic Games, Kinsella helped Great Britain qualify to the team final and individually she qualified to the all-around final. During the team final, Kinsella competed on all four apparatuses towards Great Britain's fourth-place finish. During the all-around final, Kinsella placed twelfth, which is the second best placement for a British gymnast in the all-around final after Jessica Gadirova's tenth-place finish in 2020 and tied with Becky Downie's finish in 2008.

=== 2025–2026 ===
Following the birth of her son, Parker, in September 2025, Kinsella returned to light training after four weeks with the aim of making a full return by the end of 2026. Her journey was studied by Dr. Julie Gooderick at the University of Kent for a paper titled "Returning to sport postpartum: a case study of an elite gymnast".

In March 2026, six months after giving birth, Kinsella made her return to competition at the British Championships. She only performed on the balance beam in which she placed fourth. Her return made her the first British artistic gymnast to return to competition following giving birth. In September 2026, approximately one year after giving birth, Kinsella made her return to the all-around at a friendly competition between Great Britain, France, Switzerland, Germany, and Italy. She scored 53.900 to win the all-around title, helping Great Britain win the team title as well. She was selected to represent Great Britain at the 2026 World Championships alongside Ruby Evans, Abigail Martin, Becky Downie, Alia Leat, and alternate Shantae-Eve Amankwaah.

== Personal life ==
Kinsella is the daughter of former Republic of Ireland international footballer Mark Kinsella. Her brother Liam is also a footballer who currently plays for Hednesford Town and has represented Ireland at under-age level.

In October 2024 Kinsella announced her engagement to longtime boyfriend Will Lavin. The following March she announced that they were expecting their first child. She gave birth to their son, Parker, in September 2025. Kinsella and Lavin were married on May 28, 2026.

== Competitive history ==
Competitive history of Alice Kinsella at the junior level
Year	Event	Team	AA	VT	UB	BB	FX
2014	English Championships		2nd place, silver medalist(s)				
2015	English Championships		3rd place, bronze medalist(s)	5	1st place, gold medalist(s)		
2015	British Championships		12				7
2015	Flanders Team Challenge	5	13				
2015	British Team Championships		28				
2015	Olympic Hopes Cup		1st place, gold medalist(s)				
2016	International Gymnix		15	8			3rd place, bronze medalist(s)
2016	British Team Championships		3rd place, bronze medalist(s)				
2016	English Championships		1st place, gold medalist(s)				
2016	British Championships		4			1st place, gold medalist(s)	4
2016	Italian Junior Friendly	1st place, gold medalist(s)	1st place, gold medalist(s)				
2016	European Championships	2nd place, silver medalist(s)	5		4	2nd place, silver medalist(s)	2nd place, silver medalist(s)
2016	Elite Gym Massilia		7			6	

Competitive history of Alice Kinsella at the senior level
Year	Event	Team	AA	VT	UB	BB	FX
2017	Stuttgart World Cup		7				
2017	British Championships		2nd place, silver medalist(s)			5	5
2017	English Championships		3rd place, bronze medalist(s)				3rd place, bronze medalist(s)
2017	European Championships		10				
2017	Dutch Invitational		1st place, gold medalist(s)		4	4	2nd place, silver medalist(s)
2017	British Team Championships		2nd place, silver medalist(s)				
2017	World Championships		WD				
2018	English Championships		7	4	4		6
2018	British Championships		5			2nd place, silver medalist(s)	5
2018	Birmingham World Cup		3rd place, bronze medalist(s)				
2018	Commonwealth Games	2nd place, silver medalist(s)	3rd place, bronze medalist(s)			1st place, gold medalist(s)	8
2018	Heerenveen Friendly	3rd place, bronze medalist(s)	10			2nd place, silver medalist(s)	4
2018	European Championships	4					
2018	World Championships	R1					
2019	English Championships		3rd place, bronze medalist(s)				
2019	British Championships		4		2nd place, silver medalist(s)	4	5
2019	European Championships		15			1st place, gold medalist(s)	7
2019	British Team Championships	2nd place, silver medalist(s)	2nd place, silver medalist(s)				
2019	World Championships	6	12			R2	
2021
2021	European Championships						R3
2021	Olympic Games	3rd place, bronze medalist(s)					
2022	English Championships		2nd place, silver medalist(s)		5	5	3rd place, bronze medalist(s)
2022	British Championships		5		1st place, gold medalist(s)		
2022	Commonwealth Games	1st place, gold medalist(s)	4			4	1st place, gold medalist(s)
2022	European Championships	2nd place, silver medalist(s)	2nd place, silver medalist(s)		8		
2022	British Team Championships	1st place, gold medalist(s)	1st place, gold medalist(s)				
2022	World Championships	2nd place, silver medalist(s)	4			R2	
2023	British Championships		1st place, gold medalist(s)		3rd place, bronze medalist(s)	3rd place, bronze medalist(s)	1st place, gold medalist(s)
2023	European Championships	1st place, gold medalist(s)					2nd place, silver medalist(s)
2023	World Championships	6	7				8
2024	Welsh Championships (guest)			1st place, gold medalist(s)	1st place, gold medalist(s)	2nd place, silver medalist(s)	
2024	English Championships		2nd place, silver medalist(s)		1st place, gold medalist(s)	18	1st place, gold medalist(s)
2024	European Championships	2nd place, silver medalist(s)	3rd place, bronze medalist(s)				4
2024	Olympic Games	4	12				
2026	British Championships					4	
2026	Senior Team International	1st place, gold medalist(s)	1st place, gold medalist(s)				
2026	World Championships	R1	13				8
