= Georgia-Mae Fenton =

British artistic gymnast (born 2000)

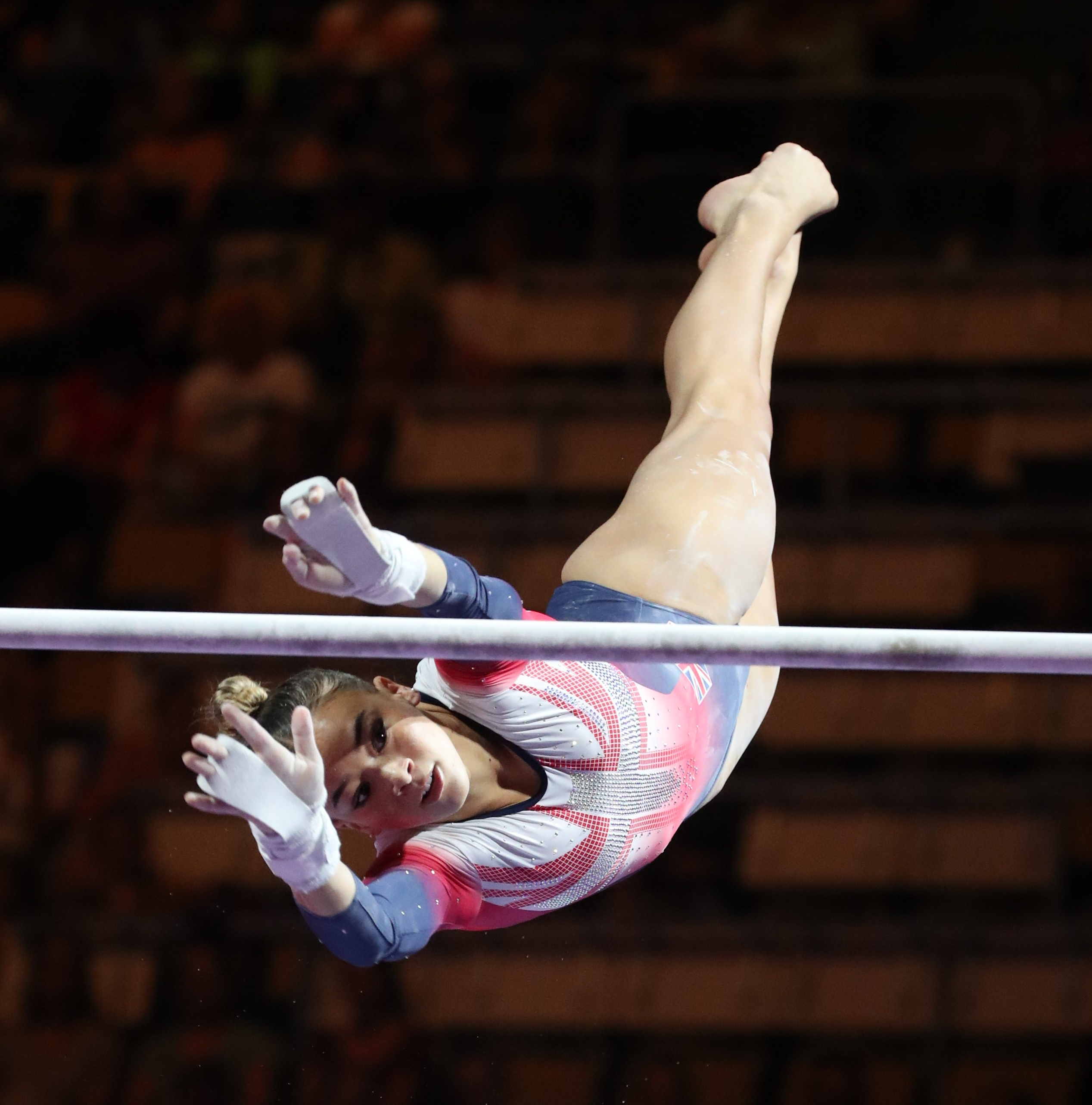
- Fenton at the 2022 European Championships

Personal information
- Nicknames: George; GMF
- Born: 2 November 2000 (age 26) Gravesend, Kent, England
- Height: 163 cm (5 ft 4 in)

Gymnastics career
- Discipline: Women's artistic gymnastics
- Country represented: (United Kingdom) Great Britain & England; (2012–present)
- Club: South Essex Gymnastics Club
- Head coach: Michelle Flemings
- Eponymous skills: Derwael-Fenton; Fenton II
Medal record
Women's artistic gymnastics
Representing Great Britain
World Championships
Silver medal – second place	2022 Liverpool	Team
European Championships
Gold medal – first place	2023 Antalya	Team
Silver medal – second place	2022 Munich	Team
Silver medal – second place	2024 Rimini	Team
Bronze medal – third place	2024 Rimini	Uneven Bars
FIG World Cup
Event / 1st / 2nd / 3rd; World Challenge Cup / 1 / 1 / 1
Representing England
Commonwealth Games
Gold medal – first place	2018 Gold Coast	Uneven Bars
Gold medal – first place	2022 Birmingham	Team
Gold medal – first place	2022 Birmingham	Uneven Bars
Silver medal – second place	2018 Gold Coast	Team

Georgia-Mae Fenton (born 2 November 2000) is an English artistic gymnast and a member of both the British national gymnastics team and the England Commonwealth Games gymnastics squad. She is the 2018 and 2022 Commonwealth champion on uneven bars, and a member of the gold medal-winning England team in 2022. With Great Britain, she was part of the team that won silver at both the 2022 European Women's Artistic Gymnastics Championships and 2022 World Artistic Gymnastics Championships, before winning the gold medal, the first for a British women's team, at the 2023 European Artistic Gymnastics Championships.

Domestically, Fenton is a four-time English champion and a two-time British champion.

== Early life ==
Fenton was inspired to start gymnastics after watching Beth Tweddle compete at the 2008 Summer Olympics. Her idol is Nastia Liukin. She also trained in ballet at a young age.

== Senior career ==
=== 2016 ===
Fenton became age-eligible for senior competition in 2016. In March, she competed at her first senior English Championships, where she took the bronze medal on floor exercise behind Claudia Fragapane and Amy Tinkler despite breaking her hand a month before. At the British Championships in April, she finished seventh in the all-around, sixth on floor and eighth on the uneven bars.

=== 2017 ===
In March, Fenton placed fourth in the all-around at the British Championships, and took the silver medal on the uneven bars behind Ellie Downie. She was then set to compete at the London World Cup, but was forced to withdraw due to a foot injury. She returned to competition at the Varna World Challenge Cup in Bulgaria, where she picked up the silver medal in the balance beam final behind Brazil's Daniele Hypólito. Additionally, she finished sixth in the uneven bars final and seventh in the floor final. She next competed at the Paris World Challenge Cup, where she placed seventh in the uneven bars final.

Fenton represented Great Britain at the 2017 World Championships in Montreal. In the qualification round, she finished tenth on the uneven bars, and was the first reserve for the final. At the World Championships, Fenton and Belgium's Nina Derwael became the first gymnasts to successfully compete a stalder to straddle tkatchev release move with a half turn on the uneven bars. As a result, the skill was named the "Derwael-Fenton" in the Code of Points.

=== 2018 ===
At the English Championships, Fenton placed third in the all-around behind Amy Tinkler and Claudia Fragapane. She was selected to represent England at the 2018 Commonwealth Games on the Gold Coast alongside Lucy Stanhope, Alice Kinsella, Kelly Simm and Taeja James. They took the silver medal in the team competition behind Canada. Individually, Fenton claimed her first significant senior championship win with gold on the uneven bars.

At the European Championships in Glasgow, the British team of Fenton, Stanhope, Kinsella, Simm and James finished fourth in the team final behind Russia, France and the Netherlands. Fenton also qualified to the floor final, where she finished eighth. She next competed at the World Championships in Doha, but did not advance to any individual finals. The British team was the first reserve for the team final.

=== 2019 ===
Fenton started her season at the English Championships, where she finished fourth in the all-around and placed first on floor. She then competed at the British Championships, where she won the gold medals on bars and beam, and finished fifth in the all-around. In June, Fenton competed at the European Games in Minsk, where she placed eighth in the all-around final and fifth in the balance beam final. At the Paris World Challenge Cup in September, Fenton finished seventh in the uneven bars final and fifth in the beam final.

Fenton was selected to compete at the World Championships in Stuttgart. The British team qualified to the team final, where they finished sixth. They also earned a team berth for the 2020 Summer Olympics in Tokyo.

=== 2020–21 ===
In March 2020, Fenton competed at the Baku World Cup, but did not advance to the finals, which were later canceled due to the COVID-19 pandemic. She did not compete during the remainder of 2020 due to the impacts of the pandemic.

In June 2021, Fenton was named the alternate to the British team for the postponed 2020 Olympic Games.

In September, Fenton won the all-around on both days of the British Worlds Trials and was selected to compete at the 2021 World Championships in Kitakyushu. She qualified to the all-around final, where she finished seventeenth.

=== 2022 ===
In March, Fenton placed third in the all-around at the English Championships, as well as first on bars and beam. She went on to take the silver on bars and the bronze on beam at the British Championships. Fenton was again selected to represent England at the Commonwealth Games and went on to win team gold alongside Ondine Achampong, Claudia Fragapane, Alice Kinsella, and Kelly Simm. She became the first woman in Commonwealth history to retain her individual uneven bars title, winning gold in the uneven bars final in Birmingham.

Following the Commonwealth Games, Fenton was also selected to represent Great Britain at the European Championships in Munich alongside Kinsella, Achampong, Jennifer Gadirova, and Jessica Gadirova. In the team final, the British team took the silver medal behind Italy. Individually, Fenton qualified to the uneven bars final, where she finished sixth.

In September Fenton was named to the team to compete at the 2022 World Championships, once again alongside the Gadirova twins, Achampong, and Kinsella. During the team final Fenton competed on uneven bars and balance beam, helping Great Britain win the silver medal and achieve their highest placement at a World Championships.

=== 2023 ===
At the English championships Fenton placed fifth on uneven bars and second on balance beam. She went on to compete the Welsh championships and placed first in the all-around, second on uneven bars and balance beam, and third on floor exercise. Fenton was named to the team to compete at the upcoming European Championships alongside Becky Downie, Ondine Achampong, Jessica Gadirova, and Alice Kinsella. At the European Championships Fenton helped Great Britain win their first team gold medal. Additionally she qualified to the all-around final.

In September Fenton was selected to represent Great Britain at the 2023 World Championships alongside Gadirova, Kinsella, Achampong, and Ruby Evans. While there she helped the team qualify in second to the team final. During the team final Fenton contributed scores on uneven bars and balance beam towards Great Britain's sixth place finish.

=== 2024 ===
Fenton began her season at English Championships, where she placed second on the uneven bars and fourth in the all-around. At the Antalya Challenge Cup she placed third on the uneven bars. At British Championships she placed fifth in the all-around. Fenton was named to the European Championships team, alongside Ondine Achampong (later replaced by Abigail Martin), Alice Kinsella, Ruby Evans, and Becky Downie. While there she helped the team win silver behind Italy and individually she won bronze on the uneven bars behind Alice D'Amato and Elisa Iorio.

In June Fenton was selected to represent Great Britain at the 2024 Summer Olympics alongside Downie, Evans, Kinsella, and Martin. During qualifications at the Olympic Games, Fenton helped Great Britain qualify to the team final and individually she qualified to the all-around final. During the team final Fenton counted scores on three apparatuses towards Great Britain's fourth place finish. During the all-around final Fenton placed eighteenth.

=== 2025 ===
Fenton attended the Koper Challenge Cup alongside Abigail Roper and Tiegan Trafford where she won gold on the balance beam.

== Eponymous skills ==
Fenton has two uneven bars skills named after her in the Code of Points.

Apparatus	Name	Description	Difficulty (Note: Valid for the 2025–2028 Code of Points)	Added to Code of Points
Uneven bars	Derwael-Fenton	Stalder to straddle Tkatchev release over high bar with ½ twist	E (0.5)	2017 World Championships
Uneven bars	Fenton II	Pike sole circle backward on high bar with counter pike hecht over high bar with ½ turn to hang in mixed L-grip	E (0.5)	2022 Commonwealth Games

== Competitive history ==
Competitive history of Georgia-Mae Fenton
Year	Event	Team	AA	VT	UB	BB	FX
2016	English Championships						3rd place, bronze medalist(s)
2016	British Championships		7		8		6
2017	British Championships		4		2nd place, silver medalist(s)		
2017	Varna World Challenge Cup				6	2nd place, silver medalist(s)	7
2017	Paris World Challenge Cup				7		
2017	World Championships				R1		
2018	English Championships		3rd place, bronze medalist(s)			1st place, gold medalist(s)	
2018	Commonwealth Games	2nd place, silver medalist(s)			1st place, gold medalist(s)		
2018	European Championships	4					8
2018	World Championships	R1					
2019	English Championships		4				1st place, gold medalist(s)
2019	British Championships		5		1st place, gold medalist(s)	1st place, gold medalist(s)	
2019	European Games		8			5	
2019	Paris World Challenge Cup				7	5	
2019	World Championships	6					
2021
2021	World Championships		17				
2022	English Championships		3rd place, bronze medalist(s)		1st place, gold medalist(s)	1st place, gold medalist(s)	
2022	British Championships		4		2nd place, silver medalist(s)	3rd place, bronze medalist(s)	
2022	Commonwealth Games	1st place, gold medalist(s)			1st place, gold medalist(s)		
2022	European Championships	2nd place, silver medalist(s)			6		
2022	World Championships	2nd place, silver medalist(s)					
2023	English Championships		4				
2023	Welsh Championships (guest)		1st place, gold medalist(s)				
2023	British Championships		3rd place, bronze medalist(s)		2nd place, silver medalist(s)		3rd place, bronze medalist(s)
2023	European Championships	1st place, gold medalist(s)	8				
2023	World Championships	6					
2024	English Championships		4		6	2nd place, silver medalist(s)	17
2024	Antalya World Challenge Cup				3rd place, bronze medalist(s)	5	4
2024	British Championships		5				
2024	European Championships	2nd place, silver medalist(s)	6		3rd place, bronze medalist(s)		
2024	Olympic Games	4	18				
2025	Koper World Challenge Cup					1st place, gold medalist(s)	
