= Gymnastics at the 2022 Commonwealth Games – Women's floor =

Women's gymnastics competition at the 2022 Commonwealth Games

Women's floor at the 2022 Commonwealth Games
- Venue: Arena Birmingham
- Dates: 30 July 2022 (qualification); 2 August 2022 (final)
- Competitors: 8 from 5 nations
- Winning Score: 13.366

Medalists
gold medal	Alice Kinsella	England
silver medal	Ondine Achampong	England
bronze medal	Emily Whitehead	Australia

The women's floor gymnastics competition at the 2022 Commonwealth Games in Birmingham, England, was held on 2 August 2022 at Arena Birmingham.

== Schedule ==
The schedule was as follows:

All times are British Summer Time (UTC+1)

Date	Time	Round
Saturday 30 July 2022	09:09	Qualification
Tuesday 2 August 2022	15:40	Final

== Results ==
=== Qualification ===
Qualification for this apparatus final was determined within the team final. The results are as follows:

Rank	Gymnast	Difficulty	Execution	Penalty	Total	Notes
1	Alice Kinsella (ENG)	5.600	7.850		13.450	Q
2	Cassie Lee (CAN)	5.000	8.000		13.000	Q
3	Emma Spence (CAN)	4.600	8.150		12.750	Q
4	Emily Whitehead (AUS)	5.000	7.850	-0.1	12.750	Q
5	Romi Brown (AUS)	5.100	7.650		12.750	Q
6	Poppy-Grace Stickler (WAL)	5.000	7.700		12.700	Q
7	Laurie Denommée (CAN)	5.000	7.650		12.650	–
8	Georgia Godwin (AUS)	5.200	7.550	-0.1	12.650	–
9	Breanna Scott (AUS)	4.900	7.700		12.600	–
10	Naveen Daries (RSA)	4.800	7.750		12.550	Q
11	Ondine Achampong (ENG)	5.300	7.250		12.550	Q
12	Caitlin Rooskrantz (RSA)	4.900	7.700	-0.1	12.500	R1
13	Georgia-Mae Fenton (ENG)	4.700	7.750		12.450	–
14	Claudia Fragapane (ENG)	5.200	7.250		12.450	–
15	Shannon Archer (SCO)	4.500	7.900		12.400	R2
16	Cara Kennedy (SCO)	4.700	7.550		12.250	R3
17	Jenna Lalonde (CAN)	4.700	7.500		12.200	
18	Emily Bremner (SCO)	4.800	7.250		12.050	
19	Emma Yap (SGP)	4.500	7.600	-0.1	12.000	
20	Sofia Micallef (WAL)	4.400	7.400		11.800	
21	Shante Koti (RSA)	4.300	7.450		11.750	
22	Eilidh Gorrell (SCO)	4.200	7.500		11.700	
23	Tara Donnelly (IOM)	4.700	7.200	-0.3	11.600	
24	Garcelle Napier (RSA)	5.000	6.550		11.550	
25	Nadine Joy Nathan (SGP)	4.500	6.950		11.450	
26	Annalise Newman-Achee (TTO)	4.900	6.350		11.250	
27	Danyella Richards (JAM)	4.100	7.050		11.150	
28	Kaitlyn Lim (SGP)	4.100	6.950		11.050	
29	Jea Maracha (WAL)	4.400	6.850	-0.3	10.950	
30	Milka Gehani (SRI)	4.600	6.350	-0.3	10.650	
31	Ruthuja Nataraj (IND)	4.400	6.350	-0.1	10.650	
32	Tatiana Bachurina (CYP)	4.200	6.500	-0.1	10.600	
33	Mia Evans (WAL)	4.600	6.500	-0.7	10.400	
34	Shandy Poh (SGP)	4.100	6.300	-0.1	10.300	
35	Pranati Nayak (IND)	4.300	5.350		9.650	
36	Amaya Kalukottage (SRI)	3.500	5.250		8.750	
37	Erin Pinder (BAR)	2.200	6.150		8.350	
38	Kaushini Gamage (SRI)	2.700	5.150		7.850	
39	Kumudi Abeyratne (SRI)	2.900	4.450		7.350	

=== Final ===
The results are as follows:

Rank	Gymnast	Difficulty	Execution	Penalty	Total
1st place, gold medalist(s)	Alice Kinsella (ENG)	5.600	7.766		13.366
2nd place, silver medalist(s)	Ondine Achampong (ENG)	5.300	7.733		13.033
3rd place, bronze medalist(s)	Emily Whitehead (AUS)	5.000	8.100	0.100	13.000
4	Emma Spence (CAN)	4.600	8.366		12.966
5	Cassie Lee (CAN)	5.000	7.900		12.900
6	Poppy-Grace Stickler (WAL)	5.000	7.866	0.300	12.566
7	Naveen Daries (RSA)	4.700	7.800	0.300	12.200
8	Romi Brown (AUS)	4.700	7.066		11.766
