= Gymnastics at the 2022 Commonwealth Games – Women's artistic team all-around =

Women's artistic gymnastics team all-around at the 2022 Commonwealth Games
- Venue: National Exhibition Centre
- Dates: 30 July 2022
- Competitors: 41 from 9 nations
- Winning score: 161.100

Medalists
gold medal	Alice Kinsella; Ondine Achampong; Georgia-Mae Fenton; Kelly Simm; Claudia Fragapane	England
silver medal	Breanna Scott; Romi Brown; Kate McDonald; Georgia Godwin; Emily Whitehead	Australia
bronze medal	Laurie Denommee; Emma Spence; Jenna Lalonde; Cassie Lee; Maya Zonneveld	Canada

The women's artistic team all-around gymnastics competition at the 2022 Commonwealth Games in Birmingham, England was held on 30 July 2022 at Arena Birmingham.

This event also determined the qualification standings for the individual all-around and apparatus finals.

== Schedule ==
The schedule was as follows:

All times are British Summer Time (UTC+1)

Date	Time	Round
Saturday 30 July 2022	09:09	Competition

== Results ==
=== Team competition ===
The initial field for the women's team event was published on 20 July 2022. The minimum entry to compete in the team event is three gymnasts, the maximum allowed is five gymnasts. India (three) and Scotland and Sri Lanka (four) are the only teams entered without maximum numbers. The top three scores on each apparatus count to the team total. The results are as follows:

Rank	Country	Vault (gymnastics)	Uneven bars	Balance beam	Floor (gymnastics)	Total
1st place, gold medalist(s)	England	41.200	41.400	40.050	38.450	161.100
1st place, gold medalist(s)	Alice Kinsella	13.900	13.650	13.450	13.450	161.100
1st place, gold medalist(s)	Ondine Achampong	14.150	13.750	13.300	12.550	161.100
1st place, gold medalist(s)	Georgia-Mae Fenton	13.150	14.000	13.300	12.550	161.100
1st place, gold medalist(s)	Kelly Simm	~~12.000~~	~~11.000~~	–	–	161.100
1st place, gold medalist(s)	Claudia Fragapane	–	–	~~11.650~~	~~11.450~~	161.100
2nd place, silver medalist(s)	Australia	40.300	40.550	39.000	38.150	158.000
2nd place, silver medalist(s)	Breanna Scott	~~13.100~~	–	12.450	~~12.600~~	158.000
2nd place, silver medalist(s)	Romi Brown	13.150	13.400	–	12.750	158.000
2nd place, silver medalist(s)	Kate McDonald	–	13.500	12.950	–	158.000
2nd place, silver medalist(s)	Georgia Godwin	13.750	13.650	13.600	12.650	158.000
2nd place, silver medalist(s)	Emily Whitehead	13.400	~~12.100~~	~~11.950~~	12.750	158.000
3rd place, bronze medalist(s)	Canada	40.100	37.950	36.250	38.400	152.700
3rd place, bronze medalist(s)	Laurie Denommee	13.650	12.450	~~11.700~~	12.650	152.700
3rd place, bronze medalist(s)	Emma Spence	13.400	12.550	12.150	12.750	152.700
3rd place, bronze medalist(s)	Jenna Lalonde	13.050	12.950	12.000	~~12.200~~	152.700
3rd place, bronze medalist(s)	Cassie Lee	–	–	12.100	13.000	152.700
3rd place, bronze medalist(s)	Maya Zonneveld	~~13.000~~	~~10.500~~	–	–	152.700
4	South Africa	38.900	36.900	35.150	36.800	147.750
4	Shante Koti	~~11.800~~	–	12.100	11.750	147.750
4	Caitlin Rooskrantz	12.950	13.350	11.100	12.500	147.750
4	Naveen Daries	12.950	12.050	~~10.800~~	12.550	147.750
4	Garcelle Napier	13.000	11.500	–	~~11.550~~	147.750
4	Mammule Rankoe	–	~~10.900~~	11.950	–	147.750
5	Wales	39.100	35.050	37.450	35.450	147.050
5	Sofia Micallef	–	11.700	12.450	11.800	147.050
5	Poppy-Grace Stickler	13.000	~~11.250~~	12.450	12.700	147.050
5	Mia Evans	13.100	11.600	~~10.550~~	~~10.400~~	147.050
5	Mali Morgan	13.000	–	–	–	147.050
5	Jea Maracha	~~12.950~~	11.750	12.550	11.950	147.050
6	Scotland	40.100	34.550	35.150	36.700	146.500
6	Emily Bremner	12.850	11.550	11.500	12.050	146.500
6	Shannon Archer	13.900	12.250	11.950	12.400	146.500
6	Eilidh Gorrell	~~11.700~~	10.750	~~11.350~~	~~11.700~~	146.500
6	Cara Kennedy	13.350	~~10.700~~	11.700	12.250	146.500
7	Singapore	37.150	30.900	32.200	34.500	134.750
7	Yuet Yung Cheong	12.050	~~9.500~~	–	–	134.750
7	Kaitlyn Lim	12.400	–	11.400	11.050	134.750
7	Nadine Joy Nathan	12.700	10.700	9.750	11.450	134.750
7	Zi Xuan Shandy Poh	–	9.950	~~9.200~~	~~10.300~~	134.750
7	Emma Yap En-Lin	~~11.250~~	10.250	11.500	12.000	134.750
8	Sri Lanka	36.100	26.150	27.400	27.350	116.900
8	Milka Gehani	12.800	12.000	9.750	10.650	116.900
8	Kaushini Gamage	11.400	7.000	~~8.000~~	7.850	116.900
8	Amaya Kalukottage	11.900	7.150	8.550	8.750	116.900
8	Kumudi Abeyratne	~~10.350~~	~~5.500~~	9.100	~~7.350~~	116.900
9	India	38.800	21.200	22.350	20.300	102.650
9	Ruthuja Nataraj	12.300	11.950	11.350	10.650	102.650
9	Protistha Samanta	12.900	–	–	–	102.650
9	Pranati Nayak	13.600	9.250	11.000	9.650	102.650
Individual competitors
	Tatiana Bachurina (CYP)	11.550	11.600	10.100	10.600	
	Tara Donnelly (IOM)	10.950	11.050	11.050	11.600	
	Danyella Richards (JAM)	12.300	9.900	10.250	11.150	
	Annalise Newman-Achee (TTO)	12.750	5.300	9.450	11.250	
	Erin Pinder (BAR)	12.150	7.500	6.800	8.350	
	Rachel Yeoh Li Wen (MAS)	–	11.800	–	–	

== Qualification results ==
=== Individual all-around ===
The results are as follows:

Position	Gymnast	Vault (gymnastics)	Uneven bars	Balance beam	Floor (gymnastics)	Total	Notes
1	Alice Kinsella (ENG)	13.900	13.650	13.450	13.450	54.450	Q
2	Ondine Achampong (ENG)	14.150	13.750	13.300	12.550	53.750	Q
3	Georgia Godwin (AUS)	13.750	13.650	13.600	12.650	53.650	Q
4	Georgia-Mae Fenton (ENG)	13.150	14.000	13.300	12.550	52.900	–
5	Emma Spence (CAN)	13.400	12.550	12.150	12.750	50.850	Q
6	Shannon Archer (SCO)	13.900	12.250	11.950	12.400	50.500	Q
7	Laurie Denommée (CAN)	13.650	12.450	11.700	12.650	50.450	Q
8	Emily Whitehead (AUS)	13.400	12.100	11.950	12.750	50.200	Q
9	Jenna Lalonde (CAN)	13.050	12.950	12.000	12.200	50.200	–
10	Caitlin Rooskrantz (RSA)	12.950	13.350	11.100	12.500	49.900	Q
11	Poppy-Grace Stickler (WAL)	13.000	11.250	12.450	12.700	49.400	Q
12	Naveen Daries (RSA)	12.950	12.050	10.800	12.550	48.350	Q
13	Jea Maracha (WAL)	12.950	11.750	12.550	11.950	48.200	Q
14	Cara Kennedy (SCO)	13.350	10.700	11.700	12.250	48.000	Q
15	Emily Bremner (SCO)	12.850	11.550	11.500	12.050	47.950	–
16	Ruthuja Nataraj (IND)	12.300	11.950	11.350	10.650	46.250	Q
17	Mia Evans (WAL)	13.100	11.600	10.550	10.400	45.650	–
18	Eilidh Gorrell (SCO)	11.700	10.750	11.350	11.700	45.500	–
19	Milka Gehani (SRI)	12.800	12.000	9.750	10.650	45.200	Q
20	Nadine Joy Nathan (SGP)	12.700	10.700	9.750	11.450	44.600	Q
21	Emma Yap (SGP)	11.250	10.250	11.500	12.000	44.550	Q
22	Tatiana Bachurina (CYP)	11.550	11.600	10.100	10.600	43.850	Q
23	Tara Donnelly (IOM)	10.950	11.050	10.100	11.600	43.700	Q
24	Danyella Richards (JAM)	12.300	9.900	10.250	11.150	43.600	R1
25	Pranati Nayak (IND)	13.600	9.250	11.000	9.650	43.500	R2
26	Annalise Newman-Achee (TTO)	12.750	5.300	9.450	11.250	38.750	R3
27	Amaya Kalukottage (SRI)	11.900	7.150	8.550	8.750	36.350	R4
28	Erin Pinder (BAR)	12.150	7.500	6.800	8.350	34.800	
29	Kaushini Gamage (SRI)	11.400	7.000	8.000	7.850	34.250	
30	Kumudi Abeyratne (SRI)	10.350	5.500	9.100	7.350	32.300	

=== Vault ===
The results are as follows:

Rank	Name	Vault 1	Vault 2	Total	Qualification
1	Shannon Archer (SCO)	13.900	13.100	13.500	Q
2	Laurie Denommée (CAN)	13.650	12.900	13.275	Q
3	Pranati Nayak (IND)	13.600	12.950	13.275	Q
4	Georgia Godwin (AUS)	13.750	12.700	13.225	Q
5	Emily Whitehead (AUS)	13.400	12.600	13.000	Q
6	Emma Spence (CAN)	13.400	12.350	12.875	Q
7	Naveen Daries (RSA)	12.950	12.750	12.850	Q
8	Cara Kennedy (SCO)	13.350	12.100	12.725	Q
9	Garcelle Napier (RSA)	13.000	12.000	12.500	R1
10	Nadine Joy Nathan (SGP)	12.700	12.150	12.425	R2
11	Mali Morgan (WAL)	13.000	11.600	12.300	R3
12	Protistha Samanta (IND)	12.900	11.000	11.950	
13	Tara Donnelly (IOM)	10.950	11.900	11.425	

=== Uneven bars ===
The results are as follows:

Rank	Gymnast	Difficulty	Execution	Penalty	Total	Notes
1	Georgia-Mae Fenton (ENG)	5.800	8.200		14.000	Q
2	Ondine Achampong (ENG)	6.100	7.650		13.750	Q
3	Georgia Godwin (AUS)	5.600	8.050		13.650	Q
4	Alice Kinsella (ENG)	5.700	7.950		13.650	–
5	Kate McDonald (AUS)	5.600	7.900		13.500	Q
6	Romi Brown (AUS)	5.300	8.100		13.400	–
7	Caitlin Rooskrantz (RSA)	5.800	7.550		13.350	Q
8	Jenna Lalonde (CAN)	5.000	7.950		12.950	Q
9	Emma Spence (CAN)	4.900	7.650		12.550	Q
10	Laurie Denommée (CAN)	4.900	7.550		12.450	–
11	Shannon Archer (SCO)	4.800	7.450		12.250	Q
12	Emily Whitehead (AUS)	5.100	7.000		12.100	–
13	Naveen Daries (RSA)	4.900	7.150		12.050	R1
14	Milka Gehani (SRI)	4.800	7.200		12.000	R2
15	Ruthuja Nataraj (IND)	4.500	7.450		11.950	R3
16	Rachel Yeoh Li Wen (MAS)	4.800	7.000		11.800	
17	Kelly Simm (ENG)	5.700	6.100		11.800	
18	Jea Maracha (WAL)	4.600	7.150		11.750	
19	Sofia Micallef (WAL)	4.300	7.400		11.700	
20	Mia Evans (WAL)	4.200	7.400		11.600	
21	Tatiana Bachurina (CYP)	4.500	7.100		11.600	
22	Emily Bremner (SCO)	4.100	7.450		11.550	
23	Garcelle Napier (RSA)	4.400	7.100		11.500	
24	Poppy-Grace Stickler (WAL)	4.700	6.550		11.250	
25	Tara Donnelly (IOM)	4.100	6.950		11.050	
26	Mammule Rankoe (RSA)	4.200	6.700		10.900	
27	Eilidh Gorrell (SCO)	4.500	6.250		10.750	
28	Cara Kennedy (SCO)	3.400	7.300		10.700	
29	Nadine Joy Nathan (SGP)	4.300	6.400		10.700	
30	Maya Zonneveld (CAN)	4.300	6.250		10.550	
31	Emma Yap (SGP)	2.700	7.550		10.250	
32	Shandy Poh (SGP)	2.100	7.850		9.950	
33	Danyella Richards (JAM)	2.800	7.100		9.900	
34	Yuet Yung Cheong (SGP)	2.800	6.700		9.500	
35	Pranati Nayak (IND)	4.100	5.150		9.250	
36	Erin Pinder (BAR)	1.900	5.600		7.500	
37	Amaya Kalukottage (SRI)	1.600	5.550		7.150	
38	Kaushini Gamage (SRI)	1.400	5.600		7.000	
39	Kumudi Abeyratne (SRI)	1.200	4.300		5.500	
40	Annalise Newman-Achee (TTO)	3.000	6.800	-4.5	5.300	

=== Balance beam ===
The results are as follows:

Rank	Gymnast	Difficulty	Execution	Penalty	Total	Notes
1	Georgia Godwin (AUS)	5.800	7.800		13.600	Q
2	Alice Kinsella (ENG)	5.600	7.850		13.450	Q
3	Georgia-Mae Fenton (ENG)	5.300	8.000		13.300	Q
4	Ondine Achampong (ENG)	5.700	7.600		13.300	–
5	Kate McDonald (AUS)	5.000	7.950		12.950	Q
6	Jea Maracha (WAL)	4.700	7.850		12.550	Q
7	Sofia Micallef (WAL)	4.500	7.950		12.450	Q
8	Poppy-Grace Stickler (WAL)	4.700	7.750		12.450	–
9	Breanna Scott (AUS)	5.600	6.950	-0.1	12.450	–
10	Emma Spence (CAN)	5.000	7.150		12.150	Q
11	Shante Koti (RSA)	4.600	7.500		12.100	Q
12	Cassie Lee (CAN)	4.600	7.500		12.100	R1
13	Jenna Lalonde (CAN)	4.200	7.800		12.000	–
14	Mammule Rankoe (RSA)	4.400	7.550		11.950	R2
15	Emily Whitehead (AUS)	4.700	7.250		11.950	–
16	Shannon Archer (SCO)	5.300	6.650		12.250	R3
17	Cara Kennedy (SCO)	4.500	7.200		11.700	
18	Laurie Denommée (CAN)	5.200	6.500		11.700	
19	Claudia Fragapane (ENG)	4.600	7.050		11.650	
20	Emily Bremner (SCO)	4.700	6.800		11.500	
21	Kaitlyn Lim (SGP)	4.500	6.900		11.400	
22	Ruthuja Nataraj (IND)	4.100	7.250		11.350	
23	Eilidh Gorrell (SCO)	4.200	7.150		11.350	
24	Caitlin Rooskrantz (RSA)	4.800	6.300		11.100	
25	Emma Yap (SGP)	4.400	6.650		11.050	
26	Pranati Nayak (IND)	4.700	6.300		11.000	
27	Naveen Daries (RSA)	4.800	6.000		10.800	
28	Mia Evans (WAL)	4.700	5.950	-0.1	10.550	
29	Danyella Richards (JAM)	4.400	5.850		10.250	
30	Tatiana Bachurina (CYP)	4.000	6.200	-0.1	10.100	
31	Tara Donnelly (IOM)	4.500	5.600		10.100	
32	Nadine Joy Nathan (SGP)	4.700	5.150	-0.1	9.750	
33	Milka Gehani (SRI)	5.000	4.750		9.750	
34	Annalise Newman-Achee (TTO)	4.200	5.250		9.450	
35	Shandy Poh (SGP)	4.000	5.200		9.200	
36	Kumudi Abeyratne (SRI)	3.900	5.200		9.100	
37	Amaya Kalukottage (SRI)	2.300	6.250		8.550	
38	Kaushini Gamage (SRI)	2.700	5.300		8.000	
39	Erin Pinder (BAR)	3.400	3.400		6.800	

=== Floor ===
The results are as follows:

Rank	Gymnast	Difficulty	Execution	Penalty	Total	Notes
1	Alice Kinsella (ENG)	5.600	7.850		13.450	Q
2	Cassie Lee (CAN)	5.000	8.000		13.000	Q
3	Emma Spence (CAN)	4.600	8.150		12.750	Q
4	Emily Whitehead (AUS)	5.000	7.850	-0.1	12.750	Q
5	Romi Brown (AUS)	5.100	7.650		12.750	Q
6	Poppy-Grace Stickler (WAL)	5.000	7.700		12.700	Q
7	Laurie Denommée (CAN)	5.000	7.650		12.650	–
8	Georgia Godwin (AUS)	5.200	7.550	-0.1	12.650	–
9	Breanna Scott (AUS)	4.900	7.700		12.600	–
10	Naveen Daries (RSA)	4.800	7.750		12.550	Q
11	Ondine Achampong (ENG)	5.300	7.250		12.550	Q
12	Caitlin Rooskrantz (RSA)	4.900	7.700	-0.1	12.500	R1
13	Georgia-Mae Fenton (ENG)	4.700	7.750		12.450	–
14	Claudia Fragapane (ENG)	5.200	7.250		12.450	–
15	Shannon Archer (SCO)	4.500	7.900		12.400	R2
16	Cara Kennedy (SCO)	4.700	7.550		12.250	R3
17	Jenna Lalonde (CAN)	4.700	7.500		12.200	
18	Emily Bremner (SCO)	4.800	7.250		12.050	
19	Emma Yap (SGP)	4.500	7.600	-0.1	12.000	
20	Sofia Micallef (WAL)	4.400	7.400		11.800	
21	Shante Koti (RSA)	4.300	7.450		11.750	
22	Eilidh Gorrell (SCO)	4.200	7.500		11.700	
23	Tara Donnelly (IOM)	4.700	7.200	-0.3	11.600	
24	Garcelle Napier (RSA)	5.000	6.550		11.550	
25	Nadine Joy Nathan (SGP)	4.500	6.950		11.450	
26	Annalise Newman-Achee (TTO)	4.900	6.350		11.250	
27	Danyella Richards (JAM)	4.100	7.050		11.150	
28	Kaitlyn Lim (SGP)	4.100	6.950		11.050	
29	Jea Maracha (WAL)	4.400	6.850	-0.3	10.950	
30	Milka Gehani (SRI)	4.600	6.350	-0.3	10.650	
31	Ruthuja Nataraj (IND)	4.400	6.350	-0.1	10.650	
32	Tatiana Bachurina (CYP)	4.200	6.500	-0.1	10.600	
33	Mia Evans (WAL)	4.600	6.500	-0.7	10.400	
34	Shandy Poh (SGP)	4.100	6.300	-0.1	10.300	
35	Pranati Nayak (IND)	4.300	5.350		9.650	
36	Amaya Kalukottage (SRI)	3.500	5.250		8.750	
37	Erin Pinder (BAR)	2.200	6.150		8.350	
38	Kaushini Gamage (SRI)	2.700	5.150		7.850	
39	Kumudi Abeyratne (SRI)	2.900	4.450		7.350	
