= Kate McDonald (gymnast) =

Australian artistic gymnast

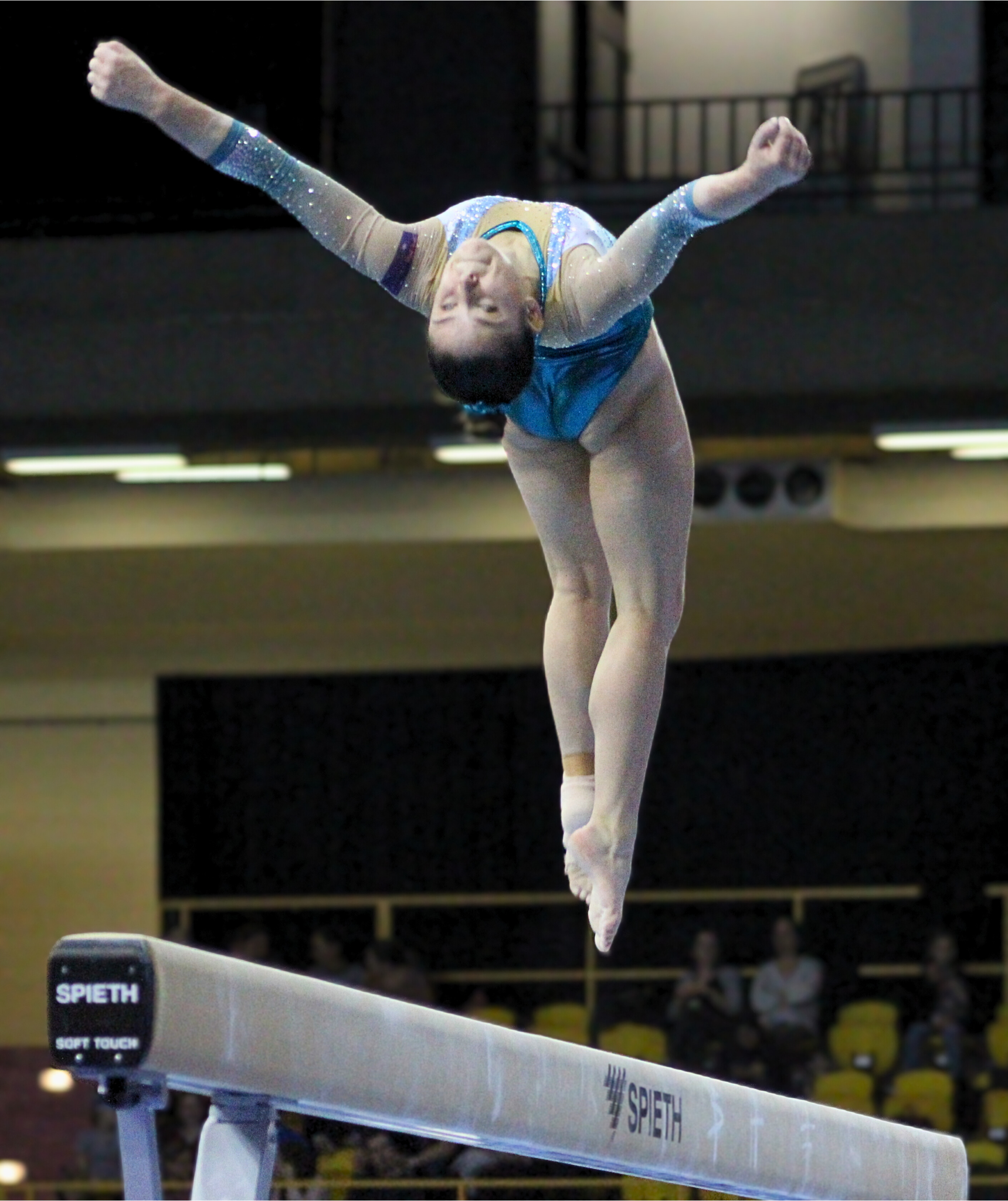
- McDonald in 2020

Personal information
- Born: 1 August 2000 (age 26) East Melbourne, Victoria, Australia

Gymnastics career
- Discipline: Women's artistic gymnastics
- Country represented: Australia; (2016–present)
- Club: CYC gym sports
- Head coach: Jeb Silsbury
Medal record
Representing Australia
Commonwealth Games
Gold medal – first place	2022 Birmingham	Balance beam
Gold medal – first place	2026 Glasgow	Team
Gold medal – first place	2026 Glasgow	Uneven bars
Silver medal – second place	2022 Birmingham	Team
Pacific Rim Championships
Bronze medal – third place	2018 Medellín	Team
Bronze medal – third place	2018 Medellín	Uneven bars
FIG World Cup
Event / 1st / 2nd / 3rd; Apparatus World Cup / 1 / 2 / 1

Kate McDonald (born 1 August 2000) is an Australian artistic gymnast. She is the 2022 Commonwealth Games champion on the balance beam and 2026 Commonwealth Games champion on the uneven bars where she also won gold with the team. She represented Australia at the 2024 Summer Olympics.

== Early life ==
McDonald was born in East Melbourne in 2000. She took up gymnastics when she was five years old.

== Gymnastics career ==
McDonald competed with the Australian team that won a bronze medal at the 2018 Pacific Rim Championships, and she won a bronze medal in the uneven bars final. She also won the uneven bars bronze medals at the 2018 and 2019 Australian Championships. She was selected to compete at the 2019 World Championships alongside Georgia-Rose Brown, Georgia Godwin, Talia Folino, and Emma Nedov. The team placed 13th in the qualification round, meaning they missed qualifying as a full team for the 2020 Summer Olympics. At the 2020 International Gymnix, she won the balance beam silver medal behind Faith Torrez.

McDonald won silver medals on both the uneven bars and balance beam at the 2022 Australian Championships. She was then selected to compete at the 2022 Commonwealth Games alongside Georgia Godwin, Romi Brown, Breanna Scott, and Emily Whitehead. Together they won the silver medal in the team competition, behind England. During event finals McDonald won gold on balance beam ahead of teammate Godwin and Emma Spence of Canada. She then competed with the Australian team that placed tenth at the 2022 World Championships, making them the second reserves for the final.

At the 2023 World Championships, McDonald helped Australia finish ninth and earn a full team berth to the 2024 Summer Olympics. Individually, she was the third reserve for the uneven bars final. She helped Australia win the team silver medal at the 2024 DTB Pokal Team Challenge, and she won the uneven bars silver medal behind Qiu Qiyuan. She was named to the Australian team to compete at the 2024 Olympic Games alongside Emma Nedov, Ruby Pass, Breanna Scott, and Emily Whitehead. The team finished tenth in the qualifications, making them the second reserve for the team final.

McDonald won her first FIG World Cup medal at the 2025 Osijek World Cup with a bronze on the uneven bars. She then won the uneven bars gold medal at the Doha World Cup.. McDonald won the 2026 Commonwealth Games medal on the Uneven bars. She was also a part of the gold-winning team at the Commonwealth Games along side Breanna Scott, Emily Whitehead, Ruby Pass and Georgia Godwin.

== Personal life ==
As of 2024, McDonald is studying a Bachelor of Environmental Science (Environmental Management and Sustainability) at Deakin University.

== Competitive history ==
Competitive history of Kate McDonald
Year	Event	Team	AA	VT	UB	BB	FX
2017	Australian Championships		8		2nd place, silver medalist(s)		
2018	Pacific Rim Championships	3rd place, bronze medalist(s)			3rd place, bronze medalist(s)		
2018	Australian Championships				3rd place, bronze medalist(s)		
2019	Australian Championships		5		3rd place, bronze medalist(s)		
2019	FIT Challenge	2nd place, silver medalist(s)	23				
2019	Australian Classic		2nd place, silver medalist(s)		1st place, gold medalist(s)		3rd place, bronze medalist(s)
2019	World Championships	13					
2020	International Gymnix	5	7			2nd place, silver medalist(s)	6
2021	Australian Championships					3rd place, bronze medalist(s)	
2022	Australian Championships		4		2nd place, silver medalist(s)	2nd place, silver medalist(s)	
2022	Oceania Championships	1st place, gold medalist(s)		3rd place, bronze medalist(s)	1st place, gold medalist(s)	2nd place, silver medalist(s)	5
2022	Commonwealth Games	2nd place, silver medalist(s)			7	1st place, gold medalist(s)	
2022	World Championships	R2					
2023
2023	World Championships	9					
2024	DTB Pokal Team Challenge	2nd place, silver medalist(s)			2nd place, silver medalist(s)		
2024	Olympic Games	10					
2025	Osijek World Cup				3rd place, bronze medalist(s)	7	
2025	Doha World Cup				1st place, gold medalist(s)		4
2025	World University Games	13	14		5		
2025	World Championships				5		
2026	Antalya World Cup				8	2nd place, silver medalist(s)	2nd place, silver medalist(s)
2026	Commonwealth Games	1st place, gold medalist(s)			1st place, gold medalist(s)	8	6
2026	World Championships	12					
