= Gymnastics at the 2018 Commonwealth Games – Women's vault =

Women's vault at the 2018 Commonwealth Games
- Venue: Coomera Indoor Sports Centre
- Dates: 6 April 2018 (qualification); 8 April 2018 (final)
- Competitors: 8 from 5 nations
- Winning score: 14.566

Medalists
gold medal	Shallon Olsen	Canada
silver medal	Ellie Black	Canada
bronze medal	Emily Whitehead	Australia

The Women's vault gymnastics competition at the 2018 Commonwealth Games in Gold Coast, Australia was held on 8 April 2018 at the Coomera Indoor Sports Centre.

== Schedule ==
The schedule is as follows:

All times are Australian Eastern Standard Time (UTC+10:00)

Date	Time	Round
Friday 6 April 2018	09:09	Qualification
Sunday 8 April 2018	15:27	Final

== Results ==
=== Qualification ===
Qualification for this apparatus final was determined within the team final.

=== Final ===
The results are as follows:

Rank	Name	D Score	E Score	Pen.	Score 1	D Score	E Score	Pen.	Score 2	Total
Rank	Name	Vault 1				Vault 2				Total
1st place, gold medalist(s)	Shallon Olsen (CAN)	6.000	8.800		14.800	5.400	8.933		14.333	14.566
2nd place, silver medalist(s)	Ellie Black (CAN)	5.400	9.000		14.400	5.200	8.866		14.066	14.233
3rd place, bronze medalist(s)	Emily Whitehead (AUS)	5.000	9.166		14.166	4.800	8.733		13.533	13.849
4	Holly Jones (WAL)	5.000	9.100		14.100	4.400	9.133		13.533	13.816
5	Shannon Archer (SCO)	5.000	8.800		13.800	4.800	8.766		13.566	13.683
6	Georgia Godwin (AUS)	4.800	8.900		13.700	4.600	9.000		13.600	13.650
7	Cara Kennedy (SCO)	5.000	8.833		13.833	4.800	8.500		13.300	13.566
8	Pranati Nayak (IND)	4.800	7.700	0.100	12.400	4.400	7.166		11.566	11.983
