= 2022 DTB Pokal Stuttgart =

Artistic gymnastics competition

- Venue: Porsche-Arena
- Location: Stuttgart, Germany
- Dates: March 18–20, 2022

The 2022 DTB Pokal Team Challenge and Mixed Cup was an artistic gymnastics competition. It featured a Team Challenge that had five-person teams representing their country in separate men's and women's junior and senior divisions and a Mixed Cup featuring teams composed of three men and three women.

== Participants ==
The Mixed Cup featured teams from four nations: host nation Germany, Italy, Canada, and the United States. The Team Competition had twelve senior MAG teams, nine senior WAG teams, eleven junior MAG teams, and eight junior WAG teams compete.

== Medalists ==
=== Senior ===
| Event | Gold | Silver | Bronze |
|---|---|---|---|
Team Challenge
Men
| Team | United States; Vitaliy Guimaraes; Asher Hong; Brody Malone; Yul Moldauer; Khoi Young | Italy; Yumin Abbadini; Nicola Bartolini; Lorenzo Minh Casali; Ludovico Edalli; Nicolò Mozzato | Germany; Carlo Hörr; Milan Hosseini; Felix Remuta; Dario Sissakis; Glenn Trebing |
| Floor Exercise | Félix Dolci (CAN) | Asher Hong (USA) | Milan Hosseini (GER) |
| Pommel Horse | Khoi Young (USA) | Benjamin Osberger (FRA) | Yumin Abbadini (ITA) |
| Rings | Asher Hong (USA) | Carlo Hörr (GER) | Félix Dolci (CAN) |
| Vault | Khoi Young (USA) | Nicolò Mozzato (ITA) | Félix Dolci (CAN) |
| Parallel Bars | Nicolau Mir (ESP) | Glenn Trebing (GER) | Lorenzo Minh Casali (ITA) |
| Horizontal Bar | Carlo Hörr (GER) | Félix Dolci (CAN) | Nicolò Mozzato (ITA) |
Women
| Team | United States; Skye Blakely eMjae Frazier; Nola Matthews; Konnor McClain; Ashlee Sullivan | Italy; Angela Andreoli; Asia D'Amato; Martina Maggio; Veronica Mandriota; Giorgia Villa | Australia; Romi Brown; Olena Edmeades; Kate Sayer; Emily Whitehead |
| Vault | Denelle Pedrick (CAN) | Asia D'Amato (ITA) | Karina Schönmaier (GER) |
| Uneven Bars | Giorgia Villa (ITA) | Romi Brown (AUS) | Nola Matthews (USA) |
| Balance Beam | Konnor McClain (USA) | Martina Maggio (ITA) | Sanna Veerman (NED) |
| Floor Exercise | Angela Andreoli (ITA) | Konnor McClain (USA) | Emily Whitehead (AUS) |
Mixed Cup
| Team | United States; Karis German; Katelyn Jong; Levi Jung-Ruivivar; Riley Loos; Curran Phillips; Colt Walker | Germany; Lea Quaas; Sarah Voss; Carlo Hörr; Dario Sissakis; Glenn Trebing | Italy; Desiree Carofiglio; Manila Esposito; Elisa Iorio; Yumin Abbadini; Lay Giannini; Mario Macchiati |

=== Junior ===
| Event | Gold | Silver | Bronze |
Men
| Team | United States; Toby Liang; Vahe Petrosyan; Fred Richard; David Shamah; Kai Uemura | Germany; Timo Eder; Gabriel Eichhorn; Alexander Kirchner; Maxim Kovalenko; Daniel Mousichidis; Jukka Nissinen | Italy; Tommaso Brugnami; Lorenzo Tomei; Diego Vazzola; Riccardo Villa; Jacopo Zuliani |
| Floor Exercise | Hugo Carmona (FRA) | Maxim Kovalenko (GER) | Tommaso Brugnami (ITA) |
| Pommel Horse | Riccardo Villa (ITA) | Axel Breche (FRA) | Daniel Mousichidis (GER) |
| Rings | Vahe Petrosyan (USA) | Paco Fernandes (FRA) | Jukka Nissinen (GER) Jack Stanley (GBR) |
| Vault | Fred Richard (USA) | Daniel Carrión (ESP) | Tommaso Brugnami (ITA) |
| Parallel Bars | Fred Richard (USA) | Nicolas Diez (FRA) | Alfred Schwaiger (AUT) |
| Horizontal Bar | Vahe Petrosyan (USA) | Riccardo Villa (ITA) | Danny Crouch (GBR) |
Women
| Team | United States; Myli Lew; Ella Murphy; Ella Kate Parker; Hezly Rivera; Tiana Sumanasekera | Australia; Miella Brown; Ava Costa; Ruby Pass; Charlotte Shin | Italy; Giulia Antoniotti; Chiara Barzasi; Camilla Ferrari; Alessia Guicciardi; July Marano |
| Vault | Tiana Sumanasekera (USA) | Ruby Pass (AUS) | Laia Font (ESP) |
| Uneven Bars | Miella Brown (AUS) | Helen Kevric (GER) | Grace Davies (GBR) |
| Balance Beam | Ruby Pass (AUS) | Tiana Sumanasekera (USA) | Tiegan Trafford (GBR) |
| Floor Exercise | Chiara Barzasi (ITA) | Meolie Jauch (GER) | Ella Kate Parker (USA) |

== Women's results ==
=== Team ===
| Rank | Team | Vault (gymnastics) | Uneven bars | Balance beam | Floor (gymnastics) | Total |
|---|---|---|---|---|---|---|
| 1st place, gold medalist(s) | United States | 42.799 (1) | 41.299 (2) | 40.366 (1) | 40.465 (1) | 164.929 |
| 1st place, gold medalist(s) | Skye Blakely | 14.266 | 12.000 | 12.900 | 13.366 | 164.929 |
| 1st place, gold medalist(s) | eMjae Frazier | 14.133 | 13.333 | 13.000 | 12.366 | 164.929 |
| 1st place, gold medalist(s) | Nola Matthews | | 14.033 | | | 164.929 |
| 1st place, gold medalist(s) | Konnor McClain | 14.400 | 13.933 | 13.766 | 13.566 | 164.929 |
| 1st place, gold medalist(s) | Ashlee Sullivan | 14.033 | | 13.600 | 13.533 | 164.929 |
| 2nd place, silver medalist(s) | Italy | 41.733 (2) | 42.466 (1) | 39.299 (2) | 40.100 (2) | 163.598 |
| 2nd place, silver medalist(s) | Angela Andreoli | 13.833 | 13.833 | 11.433 | 13.500 | 163.598 |
| 2nd place, silver medalist(s) | Asia D'Amato | 14.000 | 14.200 | 13.100 | 12.600 | 163.598 |
| 2nd place, silver medalist(s) | Martina Maggio | 13.900 | 12.566 | 13.500 | 13.300 | 163.598 |
| 2nd place, silver medalist(s) | Veronica Mandriota | 13.666 | | | 13.300 | 163.598 |
| 2nd place, silver medalist(s) | Giorgia Villa | | 14.433 | 12.666 | | 163.598 |
| 3rd place, bronze medalist(s) | Australia | 39.999 (3) | 38.966 (3) | 37.333 (3) | 36.999 (4) | 153.297 |
| 3rd place, bronze medalist(s) | Romi Brown | 13.400 | 13.600 | 11.466 | 12.133 | 153.297 |
| 3rd place, bronze medalist(s) | Olena Edmeades | 12.633 | 11.933 | 12.400 | | 153.297 |
| 3rd place, bronze medalist(s) | Kate Sayer | 13.333 | 12.133 | 12.100 | 11.900 | 153.297 |
| 3rd place, bronze medalist(s) | Emily Whitehead | 13.266 | 13.233 | 12.833 | 12.966 | 153.297 |
| 4 | Canada | 39.965 (4) | 37.232 (6) | 36.532 (4) | 37.965 (3) | 151.695 |
| 4 | Amy Jorgensen | 12.966 | 12.166 | 11.566 | 11.933 | 151.695 |
| 4 | Jenna Lalonde | 12.800 | 13.100 | 10.600 | 11.733 | 151.695 |
| 4 | Denelle Pedrick | 13.966 | 11.933 | 12.700 | 13.166 | 151.695 |
| 4 | Sydney Turner | 13.033 | 11.000 | 12.266 | 12.866 | 151.695 |
| 5 | Netherlands | 38.866 (6) | 38.265 (4) | 36.299 (5) | 36.633 (5) | 150.063 |
| 5 | Casey-Jane Meuleman | | 10.400 | 11.333 | | 150.063 |
| 5 | Mara Slippens | 13.100 | 11.066 | | 12.033 | 150.063 |
| 5 | Floor Sloof | 12.600 | | 10.566 | 12.600 | 150.063 |
| 5 | Sanna Veerman | 13.166 | 14.333 | 12.766 | 12.000 | 150.063 |
| 5 | Tisha Volleman | 12.200 | 12.866 | 12.200 | 12.000 | 150.063 |
| 6 | Spain | 39.432 (5) | 37.532 (5) | 35.266 (8) | 36.132 (6) | 148.362 |
| 6 | Emma Fernández | | 12.333 | | 12.333 | 148.362 |
| 6 | Lorena Medina | 12.600 | 11.766 | 10.700 | | 148.362 |
| 6 | Alba Petisco | 13.100 | 13.433 | 11.900 | 11.966 | 148.362 |
| 6 | Irene Ros | 13.266 | | 11.233 | 11.833 | 148.362 |
| 6 | Claudia Villalba | 13.066 | 8.400 | 12.133 | 11.733 | 148.362 |
| 7 | Germany | 39.799 (7) | 35.098 (7) | 35.566 (7) | 35.766 (7) | 145.299 |
| 7 | Julia Dumrath | | 9.833 | 12.600 | 11.400 | 145.299 |
| 7 | Anna-Lena König | 12.733 | 11.766 | 10.900 | 12.333 | 145.299 |
| 7 | Jessica Shlegel | 12.666 | 11.666 | 10.933 | 10.833 | 145.299 |
| 7 | Karina Schönmaier | 13.400 | 11.666 | 12.033 | 12.033 | 145.299 |
| 7 | Aiya Zhu | 11.600 | | | | 145.299 |
| 8 | Norway | 36.133 (8) | 32.332 (8) | 36.099 (6) | 33.866 (8) | 138.420 |
| 8 | Selma Halvorsen | | 10.533 | 11.233 | 5.033 | 138.420 |
| 8 | Julie Madsoe | 13.300 | 11.133 | 12.066 | 12.000 | 138.420 |
| 8 | Mali Neurauter | 12.400 | 10.433 | 11.533 | 10.066 | 138.420 |
| 8 | Maria Tronrud | 10.433 | 10.666 | 12.500 | 11.800 | 138.420 |
| 9 | Switzerland | 11.866 (9) | 21.332 (9) | 17.366 (9) | 23.666 (9) | 74.230 |
| 9 | Martina Eisenegger | | 11.366 | 9.300 | 10.966 | 74.230 |
| 9 | Chiara Giubellini | 11.866 | | | 12.700 | 74.230 |
| 9 | Anastassia Pascu | | 9.966 | 8.066 | | 74.230 |

=== Vault ===
| Position | Gymnast | Vault 1 | | | | Vault 2 | | | | Total |
| Position | Gymnast | D Score | E Score | Pen. | Score 1 | D Score | E Score | Pen. | Score 2 | Total |
|---|---|---|---|---|---|---|---|---|---|---|
| 1st place, gold medalist(s) | (Canada) Denelle Pedrick | 5.000 | 8.966 | | 13.966 | 3.800 | 8.800 | | 12.600 | 13.283 |
| 2nd place, silver medalist(s) | (Italy) Asia D'Amato | 5.000 | 8.800 | 0.300 | 13.500 | 4.200 | 8.700 | 0.100 | 12.800 | 13.150 |
| 3rd place, bronze medalist(s) | (Germany) Karina Schönmaier | 4.200 | 9.000 | | 13.200 | 3.800 | 9.066 | | 12.866 | 13.033 |
| 4 | (Spain) Lorena Medina | 4.200 | 8.633 | | 12.833 | 3.800 | 8.966 | | 12.766 | 142.783 |
| 5 | (Netherlands) Mara Slippens | 4.200 | 8.800 | | 13.000 | 4.000 | 8.866 | 0.300 | 12.566 | 12.783 |
| 6 | (Norway) Mali Neurauter | 3.800 | 8.400 | 0.100 | 12.100 | 3.400 | 8.433 | 0.100 | 11.733 | 11.916 |

=== Uneven bars ===
| Rank | Gymnast | D Score | E Score | Pen. | Total |
|---|---|---|---|---|---|
| 1st place, gold medalist(s) | (Italy) Giorgia Villa | 5.800 | 8.033 | | 13.833 |
| 2nd place, silver medalist(s) | (Australia) Romi Brown | 5.300 | 8.400 | | 13.700 |
| 3rd place, bronze medalist(s) | (United States) Nola Matthews | 5.800 | 7.900 | | 13.700 |
| 4 | (Canada) Jenna Lalonde | 5.000 | 7.933 | | 12.933 |
| 5 | (Spain) Alba Petisco | 5.000 | 7.233 | | 12.233 |
| 6 | (Netherlands) Sanna Veerman | 5.700 | 6.033 | | 11.733 |

=== Balance beam ===
| Rank | Gymnast | D Score | E Score | Pen. | Total |
|---|---|---|---|---|---|
| 1st place, gold medalist(s) | (United States) Konnor McClain | 6.100 | 7.933 | | 14.033 |
| 2nd place, silver medalist(s) | (Italy) Martina Maggio | 5.500 | 8.500 | | 14.000 |
| 3rd place, bronze medalist(s) | (Netherlands) Sanna Veerman | 4.800 | 7.800 | | 12.600 |
| 4 | (Australia) Emily Whitehead | 4.900 | 7.400 | | 12.300 |
| 5 | (Germany) Julia Dumrath | 4.800 | 7.000 | 0.100 | 11.700 |
| 6 | (Canada) Denelle Pedrick | 4.600 | 6.566 | | 11.166 |

=== Floor exercise ===
| Rank | Gymnast | D Score | E Score | Pen. | Total |
|---|---|---|---|---|---|
| 1st place, gold medalist(s) | (Italy) Angela Andreoli | 5.700 | 7.966 | | 13.666 |
| 2nd place, silver medalist(s) | (United States) Konnor McClain | 5.700 | 7.700 | 0.100 | 13.300 |
| 3rd place, bronze medalist(s) | (Australia) Emily Whitehead | 5.000 | 8.000 | | 13.000 |
| 4 | (Canada) Denelle Pedrick | 5.000 | 7.633 | | 12.633 |
| 5 | (Netherlands) Floor Sloof | 4.600 | 7.733 | | 12.333 |
| 6 | (Germany) Anna-Lena König | 4.700 | 7.533 | 0.300 | 11.933 |

== Mixed Cup results ==
=== Qualification ===
| Rank | Name | Round 1 | Round 2 | Round 3 | Total |
|---|---|---|---|---|---|
| 1 | United States | | | | 158.400 |
| 1 | Karis German | 13.350 | – | – | 158.400 |
| 1 | Katelyn Jong | – | 13.250 | 11.700 | 158.400 |
| 1 | Levi Jung-Ruivivar | 13.250 | 12.600 | 12.750 | 158.400 |
| 1 | Riley Loos | 13.300 | – | 12.700 | 158.400 |
| 1 | Curran Phillips | – | 14.200 | 12.900 | 158.400 |
| 1 | Colt Walker | 14.200 | 14.200 | – | 158.400 |
| 2 | Germany | | | | 154.150 |
| 2 | Lea Quass | 12.350 | 12.900 | 11.950 | 154.150 |
| 2 | Sarah Voss | 12.850 | 13.250 | 12.800 | 154.150 |
| 2 | Carlo Hörr | 11.600 | 13.350 | – | 154.150 |
| 2 | Dario Sissakis | 12.600 | – | 14.200 | 154.150 |
| 2 | Glenn Trebing | – | 12.450 | 13.859 | 154.150 |
| 3 | Italy | | | | 153.950 |
| 3 | Desiree Carofiglio | 11.850 | – | – | 153.950 |
| 3 | Manila Esposito | 12.500 | 10.650 | 12.800 | 153.950 |
| 3 | Elisa Iorio | – | 13.950 | 12.800 | 153.950 |
| 3 | Yumin Abbadini | – | 13.300 | – | 153.950 |
| 3 | Lay Giannini | 13.050 | – | 13.750 | 153.950 |
| 3 | Mario Macchiati | 12.300 | 13.000 | 14.000 | 153.950 |
| 4 | Canada | | | | 152.300 |
| 4 | Amy Jorgensen | 13.100 | 11.750 | 10.950 | 152.300 |
| 4 | Jenna Lalonde | – | – | – | 152.300 |
| 4 | Sydney Turner | 13.250 | 12.500 | 12.250 | 152.300 |
| 4 | Félix Blaquiere | – | 11.250 | 12.850 | 152.300 |
| 4 | Zachary Clay | 13.750 | 12.550 | – | 152.300 |
| 4 | Félix Dolci | 14.300 | – | 13.800 | 152.300 |

=== Final ===
| Rank | Name | Round 4 | Total |
|---|---|---|---|
Championships
| 1st place, gold medalist(s) | United States | | 57.950 |
| 1st place, gold medalist(s) | Karis German | – | 57.950 |
| 1st place, gold medalist(s) | Katelyn Jong | 14.350 | 57.950 |
| 1st place, gold medalist(s) | Levi Jung-Ruivivar | 13.900 | 57.950 |
| 1st place, gold medalist(s) | Riley Loos | – | 57.950 |
| 1st place, gold medalist(s) | Curran Phillips | 15.050 | 57.950 |
| 1st place, gold medalist(s) | Colt Walker | 14.650 | 57.950 |
| 2nd place, silver medalist(s) | Germany | | 50.450 |
| 2nd place, silver medalist(s) | Lea Quass | 9.900 | 50.450 |
| 2nd place, silver medalist(s) | Sarah Voss | 13.100 | 50.450 |
| 2nd place, silver medalist(s) | Carlo Hörr | – | 50.450 |
| 2nd place, silver medalist(s) | Dario Sissakis | 13.200 | 50.450 |
| 2nd place, silver medalist(s) | Glenn Trebing | 14.250 | 50.450 |
Third place
| 3rd place, bronze medalist(s) | Italy | | 53.250 |
| 3rd place, bronze medalist(s) | Desiree Carofiglio | 13.500 | 53.250 |
| 3rd place, bronze medalist(s) | Manila Esposito | 13.550 | 53.250 |
| 3rd place, bronze medalist(s) | Elisa Iorio | – | 53.250 |
| 3rd place, bronze medalist(s) | Yumin Abbadini | – | 53.250 |
| 3rd place, bronze medalist(s) | Lay Giannini | 13.100 | 53.250 |
| 3rd place, bronze medalist(s) | Mario Macchiati | 13.100 | 53.250 |
| 4 | Canada | | 53.050 |
| 4 | Amy Jorgensen | – | 53.050 |
| 4 | Jenna Lalonde | 12.850 | 53.050 |
| 4 | Sydney Turner | 13.600 | 53.050 |
| 4 | Félix Blaquiere | 13.900 | 53.050 |
| 4 | Zachary Clay | 12.700 | 53.050 |
| 4 | Félix Dolci | – | 53.050 |
