= Gymnastics at the 2022 Commonwealth Games – Women's vault =

Women's vault at the 2022 Commonwealth Games
- Venue: Arena Birmingham
- Dates: 30 July 2022 (qualification); 1 August 2022 (final)
- Competitors: 8 from 5 nations
- Winning score: 13.233

Medalists
gold medal	Georgia Godwin	Australia
silver medal	Laurie Denommée	Canada
bronze medal	Shannon Archer	Scotland

The Women's vault gymnastics competition at the 2022 Commonwealth Games in Birmingham, England was held on 1 August 2022 at Arena Birmingham.

== Schedule ==
The schedule was as follows:

All times are British Summer Time (UTC+1)

Date	Time	Round
Saturday 30 July 2022	09:09	Qualification
Monday 1 August 2022	14:10	Final

== Results ==
=== Qualification ===
Qualification for this apparatus final was determined within the team final. The results are as follows:

Rank	Name	Vault 1	Vault 2	Total	Qualification
1	Shannon Archer (SCO)	13.900	13.100	13.500	Q
2	Laurie Denommée (CAN)	13.650	12.900	13.275	Q
3	Pranati Nayak (IND)	13.600	12.950	13.275	Q
4	Georgia Godwin (AUS)	13.750	12.700	13.225	Q
5	Emily Whitehead (AUS)	13.400	12.600	13.000	Q
6	Emma Spence (CAN)	13.400	12.350	12.875	Q
7	Naveen Daries (RSA)	12.950	12.750	12.850	Q
8	Cara Kennedy (SCO)	13.350	12.100	12.725	Q
9	Garcelle Napier (RSA)	13.000	12.000	12.500	R1
10	Nadine Joy Nathan (SGP)	12.700	12.150	12.425	R2
11	Mali Morgan (WAL)	13.000	11.600	12.300	R3
12	Protistha Samanta (IND)	12.900	11.000	11.950	
13	Tara Donnelly (IOM)	10.950	11.900	11.425	

=== Final ===
The results are as follows:

Rank	Name	D Score	E Score	Pen.	Score 1	D Score	E Score	Pen.	Score 2	Total
Rank	Name	Vault 1				Vault 2				Total
1st place, gold medalist(s)	Georgia Godwin (AUS)	4.800	8.900		13.700	4.000	8.766		12.766	13.233
2nd place, silver medalist(s)	Laurie Denommée (CAN)	4.600	8.966		13.566	4.000	8.900		12.900	13.233
3rd place, bronze medalist(s)	Shannon Archer (SCO)	5.000	8.566	0.300	13.266	4.400	8.500		12.900	13.083
4	Emma Spence (CAN)	4.600	8.900		13.500	3.800	8.800		12.600	13.050
5	Pranati Nayak (IND)	5.200	8.533	0.100	13.633	4.200	7.866	0.300	11.766	12.699
6	Cara Kennedy (SCO)	4.200	8.666		12.866	3.800	8.600		12.400	12.633
7	Naveen Daries (RSA)	4.200	8.600		12.800	3.800	8.600	0.100	12.300	12.550
8	Emily Whitehead (AUS)	4.600	7.566	0.300	11.866	4.000	8.233	0.300	11.933	11.899
