= Ruby Pass =

Australian artistic gymnast

- Full name: Ruby Pass
- Nickname: Rubes
- Born: 17 May 2007 (age 19) Figtree, New South Wales

Gymnastics career
- Discipline: Women's artistic gymnastics
- Country represented: Australia; (Australia)
- Club: Gold Coast Gymnastics
- Gym: Premier Gymnastics Academy
- Head coach: Misha Barabach
Medal record
Representing Australia
Commonwealth Games
Gold medal – first place	2026 Glasgow	Team

Ruby Pass (born 17 May 2007) is an Australian artistic gymnast. She was named the Women's Artistic Gymnastics Junior International Gymnast of the Year for 2022 by Gymnastics Australia. She represented Australia at the 2024 Summer Olympics.

== Early life ==
Pass began gymnastics at age six in New South Wales, Australia, moving to a better club in Sydney aged ten. The journey for training was a three-hour round trip, six times a week.

== Career ==
=== 2020-2021 ===
Pass competed at the 2020 Junior International Gymnix meet, placing eleventh in the all around. She also placed fourth on floor and fifth with the team. She competed at the Junior Australian Championships in 2021, where she won gold in the all around and uneven bars, as well as silver on balance beam and floor.

=== 2022 ===
Pass began 2022 competing at the Junior DTB Pokal Team Challenge, earning the bronze in all around, a silver on vault, and a gold on balance beam. At the Junior Australian Championships she won gold on vault, balance beam, floor, and in the all around, as well as a silver on uneven bars. Later that year she competed at the Australian Classic, winning gold medals for the all around, vault, uneven bars, balance beam and floor exercise.

=== 2023 ===
Pass began competing as a senior in 2023. She competed at the Doha and Baku World Cups in March 2023, placing fifth in the Doha floor final. At the Baku World Cup she finished fifth in the bars final, eighth in the beam final and fourth in the floor final. At the Oceania Championships she won gold in the all around, vault and floor with a silver on beam. At the Australian Championships she won gold on uneven bars, with silver on balance beam, floor and in the all around. Pass then went to her first World Championships in Antwerp, Belgium, placing thirty fifth in the all around qualification.

=== 2024 ===
Pass competed at the Senior DTB Pokal Team Challenge, placing sixth in the all around. The Australian team also placed second at the competition. It consisted of Pass, Georgia Godwin, Kate McDonald, Breanna Scott and Emily Whitehead. At the Australian Championships in May 2024 Pass earned gold in the all around, vault, uneven bars and floor.

In June, Pass was selected to represent Australia at the 2024 Summer Olympics alongside Kate McDonald, Emma Nedov, Breanna Scott, and Emily Whitehead.

== Competitive history ==
Competitive history of Ruby Pass at the junior level
Year	Event	Team	AA	VT	UB	BB	FX
2021	Australian Championships		1st place, gold medalist(s)		1st place, gold medalist(s)	2nd place, silver medalist(s)	2nd place, silver medalist(s)
2022	DTB Pokal Team Challenge		3rd place, bronze medalist(s)	2nd place, silver medalist(s)		1st place, gold medalist(s)	
2022	Australian Championships		1st place, gold medalist(s)	1st place, gold medalist(s)	2nd place, silver medalist(s)	1st place, gold medalist(s)	1st place, gold medalist(s)
2022	Australian Classic		1st place, gold medalist(s)	1st place, gold medalist(s)	1st place, gold medalist(s)	1st place, gold medalist(s)	1st place, gold medalist(s)

Competitive history of Ruby Pass at the senior level
Year	Event	Team	AA	VT	UB	BB	FX
2023	Doha World Cup						5
2023	Baku World Cup				5	8	4
2023	Oceania Championships		1st place, gold medalist(s)	1st place, gold medalist(s)		2nd place, silver medalist(s)	1st place, gold medalist(s)
2023	Australian Championships		2nd place, silver medalist(s)		1st place, gold medalist(s)	2nd place, silver medalist(s)	2nd place, silver medalist(s)
2023	World Championships	9	35				
2024	DTB Pokal Team Challenge	2nd place, silver medalist(s)					
2024	Australian Championships		1st place, gold medalist(s)	1st place, gold medalist(s)	1st place, gold medalist(s)		1st place, gold medalist(s)
2024	Olympic Games	10	13				
2025
2025	Australian Championships		2nd place, silver medalist(s)		2nd place, silver medalist(s)	2nd place, silver medalist(s)	3rd place, bronze medalist(s)
2025	World Championships		36				
2026	City of Jesolo Trophy						
2026	Australian Championships		4			3rd place, bronze medalist(s)	
2026	Commonwealth Games	1st place, gold medalist(s)			8		
2026	World Championships	12					
