= Emma Nedov =

Australian artistic gymnast

- Full name: Emma Jane Nedov
- Nickname: Em
- Born: 11 March 1996 (age 30) Sydney
- Height: 1.63 m (5 ft 4 in)

Gymnastics career
- Discipline: Women's artistic gymnastics
- Country represented: Australia (2010–2020, 2024)
- Club: SGAC
- Head coaches: Darren Webster and Zhen Zhang
Medal record
Representing Australia
Pacific Rim Championships
Bronze medal – third place	2016 Everett	Team

Emma Jane Nedov (born 11 March 1996) is an Australian artistic gymnast who competed at the 2014 and 2018 World Championships. She represented Australia at the 2024 Summer Olympics.

== Early life ==
Emma Jane Nedov was born on 11 March 1996 in Sydney. She began gymnastics when she was six years old at Epping YMCA. In 2004, Nedov developed a virus that caused "severe neck pain, headaches, and constant aching muscle pain" which forced her to temporarily quit gymnastics, but she recovered after four weeks of treatment.

== Gymnastics career ==
=== Junior ===
Nedov competed at her first Junior National Championships in 2010 where she won a silver on beam and a bronze with her team. At the 2011 Junior National Championships, Nedov won gold on uneven bars and balance beam, and she won bronze in the all-around and on floor exercise. The 2011 season was also successful for Nedov internationally; she won the all-around at a friendly meet against Great Britain. She also won gold at the 2011 Commonwealth Youth Games on balance beam.

=== Senior ===
==== 2012–2013 ====
Nedov became age-eligible for senior elite in 2012, but she missed the season due to injury. She returned at the 2013 National Championships and won the gold medal on balance beam. She made her senior international debut at the 2013 Dityatin Cup in St. Petersburg where she won the silver on balance beam behind Ekaterina Kramarenko and finished seventh on floor exercise.

==== 2014 ====
Nedov began the 2014 season at the WOGA Classic where she finished ninth on balance beam. At the National Championships, Nedov won a silver on balance beam and finished fifth in the all-around and on vault. Nedov was selected to compete for Australia at the World Championships. In the qualification round, she scored a 14.266 on beam and was the first reserve for the final. The Australian team finished seventh in the team final, and Nedov contributed a 14.066 on beam. Nedov ended her season at the Élite Gym Massilia where she only competed beam, but she did not qualify for the event final.

==== 2015 ====
Nedov began her season with a sixth place finish on beam at the City of Jesolo Trophy. She also placed sixth on beam at the National Championships. At the Summer Universiade, Nedov finished eighth in the all-around final and fifth in the team final and the balance beam final. Nedov won a silver medal in the all-around and a bronze medal on beam at a friendly meet against China. This competition was Nedov's last of the season due to an injury.

==== 2016 ====
Nedov won a bronze medal with the Australian team at the Pacific Rim Championships. Nedov competed at the Olympic Test Event to help Australia in their attempt to qualify as a full team to the 2016 Olympic Games. The Australian team finished fifth and thus did not qualify. Nedov then competed at the National Championships where she won the bronze medal on beam, but ultimately Australia's sole Olympic spot went to Larrissa Miller. Nedov later remarked that Australia's failure to qualify as a team was extremely disappointing and she "actually considered retiring then." In the end, Nedov decided that she would continue compete and planned on retiring after the 2018 Commonwealth Games.

==== 2017–2018 ====
In February and March, Nedov competed at World Cup events in Melbourne, Baku and Doha where she placed fifth, sixth and seventh, respectively, on balance beam. Early in 2017, Nedov tore her Achilles tendon in training. Afterwards, Nedov retired, but she later decided to comeback. On her decision to make a comeback, Nedov stated, "After having the time off, experiencing life without gymnastics and getting a proper job, I decided that I’d give my all and go for it one last time." Nedov returned to competition in September 2018 at the Australian Classic where she finished fourth in the all-around and won the gold on balance beam. Then, Nedov was selected to compete at the 2018 World Championships where she helped the Australian team finish fifteenth.

==== 2019 ====
Nedov competed at the 2019 Melbourne World Cup where she won a silver on balance beam and finished fourth on floor exercise. In March 2019, Nedov starred in an advertisement for activewear brand Running Bare as a part of their "This One’s For Me" campaign. Nedov won the gold medal on beam at the Baku World Cup. At the National Championships, Nedov won the gold medal on balance beam and won the bronze medal in the all-around.

==== 2023–2024 ====
Nedov returned to training in late 2023. She competed at the National Championships on the Gold Coast in May 2024, where she finished fourth in the all around. In June Nedov was named to the Australian team to compete at the 2024 Olympic Games alongside Kate McDonald, Ruby Pass, Breanna Scott, and Emily Whitehead.

== Competitive history ==
Competitive history of Emma Nedov
Year	Event	Team	AA	VT	UB	BB	FX
2010	Australian Championships	3rd place, bronze medalist(s)	7	8	7	2nd place, silver medalist(s)	7
2011	International Gymnix		17			8	
2011	Australian Championships		3rd place, bronze medalist(s)	6	1st place, gold medalist(s)	1st place, gold medalist(s)	7
2011	Commonwealth Youth Games	3rd place, bronze medalist(s)	5		4	1st place, gold medalist(s)	7
2013	Aleksandr Dityatin Cup					2nd place, silver medalist(s)	7
2013	Australian Championships				7	1st place, gold medalist(s)	
2014	WOGA Classic				21	9	
2014	Australian Championships		5	5		2nd place, silver medalist(s)	
2014	World Championships	7				R1	
2015	City of Jesolo Trophy				6		
2015	Australian Championships				6		
2015	Summer Universiade	5	8		5		
2015	Australia-China Friendly		2nd place, silver medalist(s)				
2016	Pacific Rim Championships	3rd place, bronze medalist(s)					
2016	Olympic Test Event	5	18				
2016	Australian Championships		8	8	6	3rd place, bronze medalist(s)	
2017	Melbourne World Cup					5	
2017	Baku World Cup					6	
2017	Doha World Cup					7	
2018	Australian Classic		4			1st place, gold medalist(s)	
2019	Melbourne World Cup					2nd place, silver medalist(s)	4
2019	International Gymnix	3rd place, bronze medalist(s)	6		3rd place, bronze medalist(s)	4	
2019	Baku World Cup					1st place, gold medalist(s)	7
2019	Australian Championships		3rd place, bronze medalist(s)			1st place, gold medalist(s)	
2019	FIT Challenge	2nd place, silver medalist(s)	4			1st place, gold medalist(s)	
2019	Australian Classic		4			1st place, gold medalist(s)	
2019	Cottbus World Cup					4	
2020	Melbourne World Cup					6	
2024	Australian Championships		4				
2024	Oceania Championships		1st place, gold medalist(s)		2nd place, silver medalist(s)	1st place, gold medalist(s)	2nd place, silver medalist(s)
2024	Olympic Games	10					
