= Breanna Scott =

Australian artistic gymnast

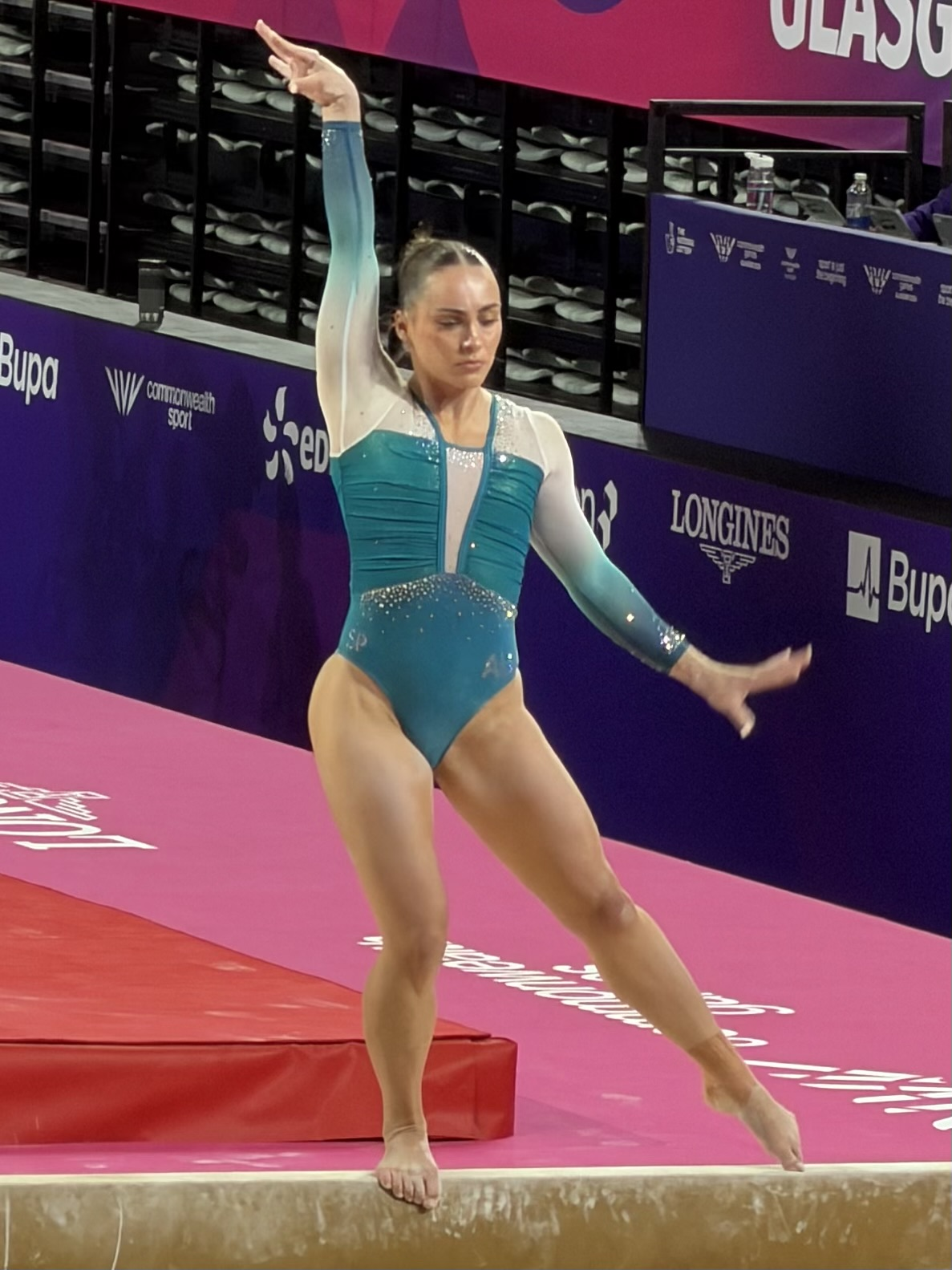
- Scott at the 2026 Commonwealth Games

Personal information
- Nickname: Bre
- Born: 12 December 2001 (age 24) Singapore

Gymnastics career
- Discipline: Women's artistic gymnastics
- Country represented: Australia; (2020–present)
- Club: Waverly Gymnastics
- Head coach: John Hart
- Assistant coaches: Jessica Mason; Yusuf Topari
Medal record
Representing Australia
Commonwealth Games
| Gold medal – first place | 2026 Glasgow | Team |
| Gold medal – first place | 2026 Glasgow | Balance beam |
| Silver medal – second place | 2022 Birmingham | Team |
| Silver medal – second place | 2026 Glasgow | All-around |
Event / 1st / 2nd / 3rd; Apparatus World Cup / 0 / 0 / 2

Breanna Scott (born 12 December 2001) is an Australian artistic gymnast. She was a member of the silver medal-winning team at the 2022 Commonwealth Games and represented Australia at the 2024 Summer Olympics. She is the 2025 Australian all-around champion. She was a member of the gold medal-winning team at the 2026 Commonwealth Games

== Early life ==
Scott was born in Singapore and grew up in Sydney. She began gymnastics when she was seven years old.

== Gymnastics career ==
=== 2020–2021 ===
Scott made her international debut at the 2020 Melbourne World Cup and finished sixth in the floor exercise final. Then at the 2020 International Gymnix, she finished seventh in the floor exercise final. She won her first Australian Championships medals in 2021 when she won the bronze medal in the all-around.

=== 2022 ===
Scott was selected to compete at the 2022 Commonwealth Games alongside Georgia Godwin, Romi Brown, Kate McDonald, and Emily Whitehead. Together they won the silver medal in the team competition, behind England. She then competed with the Australian team that placed tenth at the 2022 World Championships, making them the second reserves for the final.

=== 2023 ===
Scott won a bronze medal on the floor exercise, behind Sabrina Voinea and Chiaki Hatakeda, at the Doha World Cup. At the Paris World Challenge Cup, she finished fourth in the balance beam final. Scott competed at the 2023 World Championships. While there she helped Australia finish ninth in qualification. Although they did not qualify for the team final, they successfully qualified a full team to the 2024 Olympic Games.

=== 2024 ===
Scott started the year competing at the DTB Pokal Team Challenge where she helped Australia win the silver medal behind China. She next competed at the Australian National Championships where she finished second in the all-around behind Ruby Pass. She also won her first Australian national title on the balance beam. In June Scott was named to the Australian team to compete at the 2024 Olympic Games alongside Kate McDonald, Emma Nedov, Pass, and Emily Whitehead. She competed on the vault and balance beam to help the team finished tenth in the qualifications.

=== 2025 ===
Scott won the all-around title at the 2025 Australian Championships.

== Competitive history ==
Competitive history of Breanna Scott
| Year | Event | Team | AA | VT | UB | BB | FX |
|---|---|---|---|---|---|---|---|
| 2016 | Junior Australian Championships | | 10 | 5 | | 5 | |
| 2018 | Australian Championships | | 12 | | | | |
| 2018 | Australian Classic | | 10 | | | | |
| 2019 | Australian Championships | | 9 | | | | |
| 2019 | Australian Classic | | 6 | | | | |
| 2020 | Melbourne World Cup | | | | | | 6 |
| 2020 | International Gymnix | 5 | | | | | 7 |
| 2021 | Australian Championships | | 3rd place, bronze medalist(s) | | 3rd place, bronze medalist(s) | 2nd place, silver medalist(s) | 3rd place, bronze medalist(s) |
| 2022 | Australian Championships | | 5 | | | | |
| 2022 | Oceania Championships | 1st place, gold medalist(s) | 2nd place, silver medalist(s) | | | | |
| 2022 | Commonwealth Games | 2nd place, silver medalist(s) | | | | | |
| 2022 | World Championships | 10 | | | | | |
| 2023 | Doha World Cup | | | | | | 3rd place, bronze medalist(s) |
| 2023 | Oceania Championships | 1st place, gold medalist(s) | | | | | |
| 2023 | Paris World Challenge Cup | | | | | 4 | |
| 2023 | World Championships | 9 | | | | | |
| 2024 | DTB Pokal Team Challenge | 2nd place, silver medalist(s) | | | | | |
| 2024 | Australian Championships | | 2nd place, silver medalist(s) | | | | |
| 2024 | Olympic Games | 10 | | | | | |
2025
| 2025 | World Championships | —N/a | 12 | | | | |
| 2026 | Antalya World Cup | | | | | 3rd place, bronze medalist(s) | |
| 2026 | Australian Championships | | 1st place, gold medalist(s) | | 1st place, gold medalist(s) | 1st place, gold medalist(s) | 1st place, gold medalist(s) |
| 2026 | Commonwealth Games | 1st place, gold medalist(s) | 2nd place, silver medalist(s) | | | 1st place, gold medalist(s) | |
| 2026 | World Championships | 12 | 23 | | | R3 | |
