= Emily Whitehead =

Australian artistic gymnast

- Nickname: Em
- Born: 11 December 2000 (age 25) Mornington, Victoria, Australia
- Height: 162 cm (5 ft 4 in)

Gymnastics career
- Discipline: Women's artistic gymnastics
- Country represented: Australia; (2014–present)
- Club: Waverley Gymnastics Centre
- Head coach: John Hart
Medal record
Representing Australia
Commonwealth Games
Gold medal – first place	2026 Glasgow	Team
Silver medal – second place	2022 Birmingham	Team
Bronze medal – third place	2018 Gold Coast	Team
Bronze medal – third place	2018 Gold Coast	Vault
Bronze medal – third place	2022 Birmingham	Floor exercise
FIG World Cup
Event / 1st / 2nd / 3rd; Apparatus World Cup / 0 / 1 / 0

Emily Whitehead (born 11 December 2000) is an Australian artistic gymnast. At the 2018 Commonwealth Games, she won a bronze medal in the team event and on the vault. She represented Australia at the 2020 and 2024 Olympic Games and is a two-time Oceanic all-around champion (2021-22). She is the 2015 Australian junior national all-around champion and a three-time national all-around medalist at the senior level (2018, 2021-22). She won a silver medal on the vault at the 2018 Melbourne World Cup.

== Personal life ==
Whitehead was born in Mornington, a suburb of Melbourne, Victoria, and attended Mount Waverley Secondary College. She began gymnastics when she was four years old because her older sister was also a gymnast.

Whitehead currently studies a Bachelor of Exercise and Sport Science at Deakin University.

== Career ==
=== Junior ===
Whitehead made her international debut at the 2014 City of Jesolo Trophy, helping the Australian team place fifth and finishing twenty-fourth in the all-around. Then at the 2014 Pacific Rim Championships, she finished fifth with the team and qualified for the floor exercise final where she finished eighth. Her final competition of the 2014 season was the Australian Championships held in Melbourne. She won a gold medal with the Victorian team and won the all-around silver medal behind teammate Alysha Djuric. She also won the gold medal on the balance beam and the bronze medal on the floor exercise, and she placed fifth on vault and fourth on uneven bars.

Whitehead opened her 2015 season at the City of Jesolo Trophy placing fourth with the Australian team and in the uneven bars event final. Then at the Australian Championships, she won the all-around title in addition to the team, uneven bars, and floor exercise titles. She also won the silver medal on the balance beam behind Talia Folino and the bronze medal on the vault. The final meet of her junior career was the Junior Japan International held in Yokohama. She only competed on the uneven bars and did not advance into the event final.

=== Senior ===
Whitehead became age-eligible for senior competition in 2016. She was initially selected to represent Australia at the 2016 Olympic Test Event in its effort to qualify a team spot for the 2016 Olympic Games. However, during podium training at the 2016 Pacific Rim Championships, she tore her calf muscle and had to withdraw from the team and Olympic selection. At the 2016 Australian Championships, she only competed on the uneven bars and won the silver medal behind Rianna Mizzen in addition to a team gold medal with Victoria.

Whitehead returned to all-around competition at the 2017 American Cup in Newark, New Jersey where she finished seventh with a total score of 48.399. At the 2017 International Gymnix, she won a silver medal on the uneven bars behind Japan's Hitomi Hatakeda and also placed seventh with the team, tenth in the all-around, and seventh on the floor exercise.

Whitehead won the silver medal on the vault at the 2018 Melbourne World Cup behind Slovenia's Tjaša Kysselef, the first World Cup medal of her career. She was selected to represent Australia at the 2018 Commonwealth Games alongside Georgia-Rose Brown, Alexandra Eade, Rianna Mizzen, and Georgia Godwin, and they won the bronze medal in the team event behind England and Canada. She won the bronze medal in the vault final behind Canadians Shallon Olsen and Ellie Black. She also competed in the balance beam final and finished fifth. At the Australian Championships, she won the silver medal in the all-around behind Georgia Godwin and also took home team gold. She also won the gold medal on vault, the silver medal on floor exercise, the bronze medal on balance beam, and placed fourth on uneven bars. Then in September at the Australian Classic, she won the all-around bronze medal behind Georgia-Rose Brown and Rianna Mizzen. She also won the silver medal on the floor exercise and placed fourth on the uneven bars and balance beam. She then competed at the 2018 World Championships in Doha alongside Georgia-Rose Brown, Alexandra Eade, Emma Nedov, and Erin Modaro, and the team finished fifteenth in the qualification round.

Whitehead began her 2019 season at the Australian Championships and finished fourth in the all-around, uneven bars, balance beam and ninth in the floor exercise. Then at the FIT Challenge in Ghent, the Australian team won the silver medal behind the Netherlands, and Whitehead placed seventh in the all-around. In August 2019, she sustained fractures in both sides of her back, leaving her out of the gym for three months and ending her 2019 season. She did not compete in 2020 due to the COVID-19 pandemic in Australia.

Whitehead won the all-around gold medal at the 2021 Oceanic Championships and earned a continental quota spot for the 2020 Olympics. Then at the 2021 Australian Championships, she won the all-around silver medal behind Georgia Godwin. She also won the uneven bars and floor exercise silver medals and placed fourth on the balance beam. She represented Australia at the 2020 Summer Olympics in Tokyo alongside teammate Georgia Godwin. In the qualification round, Whitehead finished forty-fourth in the all-around with a total score of 52.298 and did not advance into any finals.

Whitehead began her 2022 season at the DTB Pokal Team Challenge in Stuttgart where Australia won the bronze medal behind the United States and Italy. In the event finals, she won the bronze medal on the floor exercise behind Angela Andreoli and Konnor McClain and also placed fourth on the balance beam. Then at the Australian Championships, she won the all-around silver medal behind Georgia Godwin. She also won gold on floor exercise and bronze on balance beam, and she placed fourth on the uneven bars. She defended her all-around title at the 2022 Oceania Championships and also won team, vault, and floor exercise gold, silver on uneven bars, and bronze on balance beam. She was then selected to represent Australia at the 2022 Commonwealth Games alongside Romi Brown, Georgia Godwin, Kate McDonald, and Breanna Scott.

In June 2024 Whitehead was named to the Australian team to compete at the 2024 Olympic Games alongside Kate McDonald, Emma Nedov, Ruby Pass, and Breanna Scott.

== Competitive history ==
Competitive history of Emily Whitehead at the junior level
Year	Event	Team	AA	VT	UB	BB	FX
2014	City of Jesolo Trophy	5	24				
2014	Pacific Rim Championships	5				8	
2014	Australian Championships	1st place, gold medalist(s)	2nd place, silver medalist(s)	5	4	1st place, gold medalist(s)	3rd place, bronze medalist(s)
2015	City of Jesolo Trophy	4			4		
2015	Australian Championships	1st place, gold medalist(s)	1st place, gold medalist(s)	3rd place, bronze medalist(s)	1st place, gold medalist(s)	2nd place, silver medalist(s)	1st place, gold medalist(s)

Competitive history of Emily Whitehead at the senior level
Year	Event	Team	AA	VT	UB	BB	FX
2016	Australian Championships	1st place, gold medalist(s)			1st place, gold medalist(s)		
2017	American Cup		7				
2017	International Gymnix	7	10		2nd place, silver medalist(s)		7
2018	Melbourne World Cup			2nd place, silver medalist(s)			
2018	Commonwealth Games	3rd place, bronze medalist(s)		3rd place, bronze medalist(s)		5	
2018	Australian Championships	1st place, gold medalist(s)	2nd place, silver medalist(s)	1st place, gold medalist(s)	4	3rd place, bronze medalist(s)	2nd place, silver medalist(s)
2018	Australian Classic		3rd place, bronze medalist(s)		4	4	2nd place, silver medalist(s)
2018	World Championships	15					
2019	Australian Championships		4		4	4	9
2019	FIT Challenge	2nd place, silver medalist(s)	7				
2021	Oceanic Championships		1st place, gold medalist(s)				
2021	Australian Championships		2nd place, silver medalist(s)		2nd place, silver medalist(s)	4	2nd place, silver medalist(s)
2021	Olympic Games		44				
2022	DTB Pokal Team Challenge	3rd place, bronze medalist(s)				4	3rd place, bronze medalist(s)
2022	Australian Championships		2nd place, silver medalist(s)		4	3rd place, bronze medalist(s)	1st place, gold medalist(s)
2022	Oceanic Championships	1st place, gold medalist(s)	1st place, gold medalist(s)	1st place, gold medalist(s)	2nd place, silver medalist(s)	3rd place, bronze medalist(s)	1st place, gold medalist(s)
2022	Commonwealth Games	2nd place, silver medalist(s)	12	8			3rd place, bronze medalist(s)
2023
2023	World Championships	9					
2024	DTB Pokal Team Challenge	2nd place, silver medalist(s)					
2024	Olympic Games	10					
2026	Oceanic Championships	1st place, gold medalist(s)	1st place, gold medalist(s)				
2026	Commonwealth Games	1st place, gold medalist(s)					
2026	World Championships	12					
