= Milka Gehani =

Sri Lankan artistic gymnast

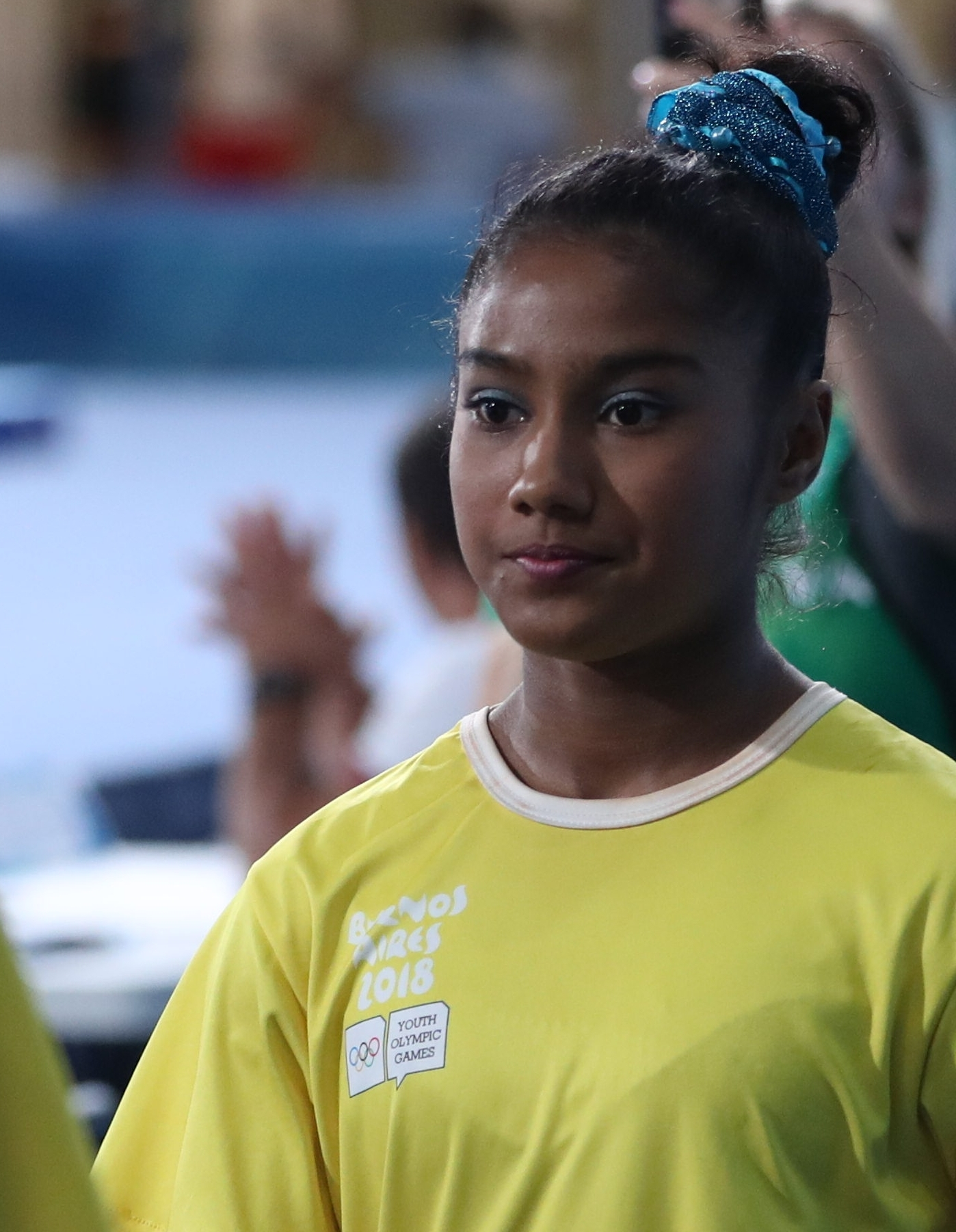
- Gehani at the 2018 Summer Youth Olympics

Personal information
- Full name: Elpitiya Badalge Dona Milka Gehani Divyanjala de Silva
- Alternative name: Milka Gehani de Silva
- Nickname: Miki
- Born: 24 April 2003 (age 23) Colombo, Sri Lanka
- Height: 1.40 m (4 ft 7 in)

Gymnastics career
- Discipline: Women's artistic gymnastics
- Country represented: Sri Lanka
- Training location: Tokyo, Japan
- Gym: Tsukahara Gymnastics Center
- Former coach: Ranjana Tharanga

Milka Gehani de Silva (born 24 April 2003) is a Sri Lankan artistic gymnast. She earned a continental quota spot to the 2020 Summer Olympics after the cancellation of the 2021 Asian Championships. She was the first Sri Lankan gymnast across all disciplines to compete in the Olympics. She also represented Sri Lanka at the 2018 Summer Youth Olympics and the 2019 and 2022 World Championships.

== Early life ==
Milka Gehani was born in Colombo, Sri Lanka in 2003. She won her first junior national title at the age of eight. In 2019, she received an IOC-funded scholarship to receive training in Japan.

== Career ==
=== Junior ===
Milka made her international debut at the 2016 Junior Commonwealth Championships in Namibia, qualifying for every individual final. She finished tenth in the all-around final, sixth on the vault, sixth on the uneven bars, fifth on the balance beam, and sixth on floor exercise, also contributing to the Sri Lankan team's fourth-place finish.

In May 2017, Milka competed at the Asian Junior Championships in Bangkok, Thailand, placing eighth with the Sri Lankan team and 17th in the all-around. She improved that result at the 2018 Asian Junior Championships in Jakarta, Indonesia, finishing 14th all-around. She represented Sri Lanka at the 2018 Summer Youth Olympics in Buenos Aires, Argentina, where she placed 28th all-around in qualifications but did not make the finals. In the mixed multi-discipline team event, her team finished ninth.

=== Senior ===
Milka became age-eligible for senior competition in 2019. She began training in Japan in 2019 after receiving a scholarship from the International Olympic Committee. She made her World Championship debut at the 2019 World Championships in Stuttgart, Germany. She placed 114th in qualifications, missing out on Olympic qualification. In September 2020, she competed at the All-Japan Senior Championships in Takasaki, placing 40th in the all-around.

In May 2021, she was awarded one of the two available Asian continental berths to the 2020 Summer Olympics due to the cancellation of the 2021 Asian Championships, as she was the highest ranked eligible athlete based on the results of the 2019 World Championships. This marked Sri Lanka's debut in gymnastics at the Olympic Games. She also became the second Sri Lankan athlete to qualify for the 2020 Tokyo Olympics after Mathilda Karlsson. In July, it was announced that Milka would be Sri Lanka's flag bearer at the 2020 Summer Olympics Parade of Nations alongside judoka Chamara Dharmawardana, becoming the country's youngest ever flag bearer. At the Olympic Games, Milka placed 78th in the all-around during qualifications, and did not advance to the final. She received an extension to her scholarship to continue her training in Japan for another two years after the Olympics.

After the Olympic Games, Milka competed at the 2021 All-Japan Senior Championships, finishing seventh in the all-around. Then she competed at the All-Japan Team Championships, finishing ninth in the all-around and helping her club finish seventh. At the 2022 All-Japan Championships, she finished 73rd in the all-around qualification round. Then at the 2022 Asian Championships, she finished eleventh in the all-around and qualified for the World Championships. She withdrew from the all-around final at the Commonwealth Games due to an injury. Then at the World Championships, she withdrew after injuring her right foot on the floor exercise.

Milka finished ninth in the all-around at the 2023 Asian Championships and qualified for the 2023 World Championships. She also qualified for the uneven bars event final where she finished sixth.

== Competitive history ==
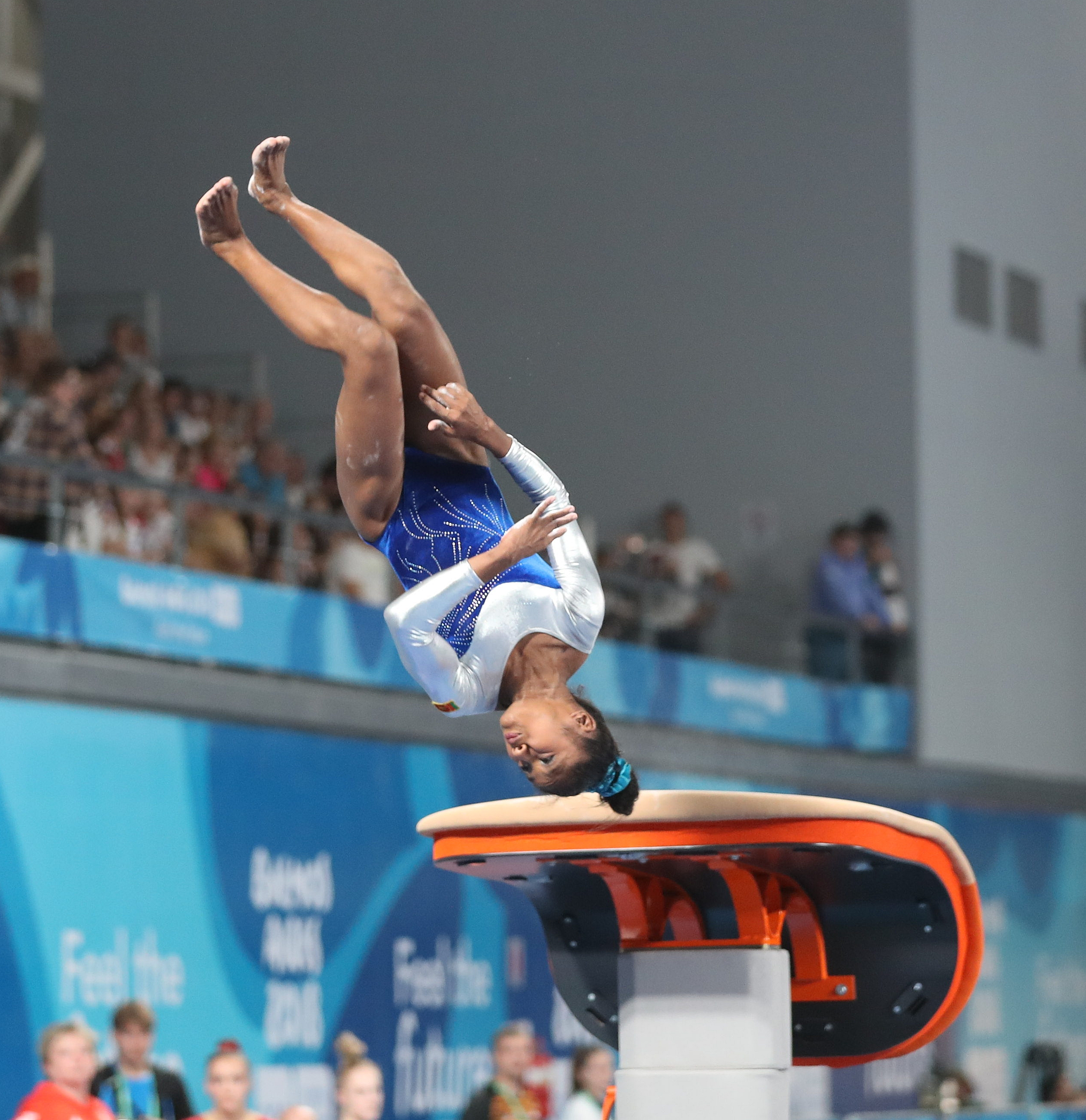
Milka vaulting at the 2018 Summer Youth Olympics

Year	Event	Team	AA	VT	UB	BB	FX
Junior
2016	Junior Commonwealth Championships	4	10	6	6	5	6
2017
2017	Asian Junior Championships	8	17				
2018
2018	Asian Junior Championships	10	14				
2018	Youth Olympic Games	9	28				
Senior
2019
2019	World Championships		114				
2020	All-Japan Senior Championships		40				
2021
2021	Olympic Games		78				
2021	All-Japan Senior Championships		7				
2021	All-Japan Team Championships	7	9				
2022	All-Japan Championships		73				
2022	Asian Championships		11				
2022	Commonwealth Games	8	DNF				
2022	World Championships		DNF				
2023
2023	Asian Championships		9		6		
