= Shannon Archer =

Scottish artistic gymnast

- Born: 29 July 1998 (age 28) Edinburgh, Scotland

Gymnastics career
- Discipline: Women's artistic gymnastics
- Country represented: Scotland (2010–2024) (United Kingdom) Great Britain; (2010–2013, 2022)
- Club: South Essex Gymnastics Club
- Head coach: Ross Falsetta
- Retired: 17 March 2024
Medal record
Representing Scotland
Commonwealth Games
Bronze medal – third place	2022 Birmingham	Vault
Northern European Championships
Bronze medal – third place	2017 Tórshavn	Team
- Education: Edinburgh Napier University

Shannon Archer (born 29 July 1998 in Edinburgh) is a Scottish artistic gymnast. She was the first Scottish gymnast to win a medal in women's artistic gymnastics at the Commonwealth Games, earning a bronze on vault in 2022.

== Early life ==
Archer was born in 1998 in Edinburgh. Her mother, Wendy Purdie, was a Scottish indoor lawn bowls player. Archer earned a Bachelor of Science in Developing Athletes Through Professional Practice from Edinburgh Napier University.

== Gymnastics career ==
Archer made her international debut for Scotland at the 2011 Commonwealth Youth Games where she helped Scotland finish fourth as a team. In 2017, Archer won her first senior national title and helped Scotland win the bronze medal at the Northern European Championships.

Archer competed at the 2018 Commonwealth Games where she helped Scotland finish fifth as a team. Individually she finished tenth in the all-around and fifth on vault.

In 2020, Archer moved started training at the South Essex Gymnastics Club. She reclaimed the Scottish national title in 2021 and successfully defended it the following year.

Archer competed at the 2022 Commonwealth Games where she helped Scotland finish sixth as a team. During the all-around competition she finished eighth. During the vault final Archer finished third behind Georgia Godwin of Australia and Laurie Denommée of Canada, earning herself the bronze medal. In doing so Archer became the first Scottish female artistic gymnast to win a medal at the Commonwealth Games.

== Competitive history ==
Year	Event	Team	AA	VT	UB	BB	FX
2011	Commonwealth Youth Games	4				7	6
2015	Scottish Championships		4		4	5	2nd place, silver medalist(s)
2015	British Team Championships	5	11				
2015	Northern European Championships			7			
2016	Scottish Championships		3rd place, bronze medalist(s)	2nd place, silver medalist(s)		2nd place, silver medalist(s)	1st place, gold medalist(s)
2016	International Gymnix (Challenge)		20	2nd place, silver medalist(s)			
2016	British Team Championships	7	23				
2016	British Championships		11	5		6	
2016	Northern European Championships	5		7			4
2016	Mälarcupen		2nd place, silver medalist(s)	1st place, gold medalist(s)		1st place, gold medalist(s)	2nd place, silver medalist(s)
2017	Scottish Championships		1st place, gold medalist(s)	1st place, gold medalist(s)		1st place, gold medalist(s)	1st place, gold medalist(s)
2017	British Championships		13	5			
2017	British Team Championships	4	12				
2017	Northern European Championships	3rd place, bronze medalist(s)		4			
2018	Scottish Championships		3rd place, bronze medalist(s)	3rd place, bronze medalist(s)		7	1st place, gold medalist(s)
2018	British Championships		17	8		8	
2018	Commonwealth Games	5	10	5			
2019	British Team Championships	10	10				
2021	Scottish Championships		1st place, gold medalist(s)				
2022	Scottish Championships		1st place, gold medalist(s)	8	1st place, gold medalist(s)	2nd place, silver medalist(s)	
2022	English Championships (guest)				2nd place, silver medalist(s)	4	
2022	Commonwealth Games	6	8	3rd place, bronze medalist(s)	8		
2024	Scottish Championships		1st place, gold medalist(s)	1st place, gold medalist(s)	1st place, gold medalist(s)	7	1st place, gold medalist(s)
