= Laurie Denommée =

Canadian artistic gymnast

- Born: 16 August 2000 (age 26) Saint-Eustache, Quebec, Canada

Gymnastics career
- Discipline: Women's artistic gymnastics
- Country represented: Canada (2017–2024)
- Head coach: Claude Pelletier
Medal record
Women's artistic gymnastics
Representing Canada
World Championships
Bronze medal – third place	2022 Liverpool	Team
Commonwealth Games
Silver medal – second place	2022 Birmingham	Vault
Bronze medal – third place	2022 Birmingham	Team
Pacific Rim Championships
Silver medal – second place	2024 Cali	Team

Laurie Denommée (born 16 August 2000) is a Canadian artistic gymnast. A national team member since 2017, she represented Canada at the 2022 Commonwealth Games and the 2022 World Artistic Gymnastics Championships where she contributed to two team bronze medal finishes, the latter being a historic feat for Canada. Individually, she is the 2022 Commonwealth vault silver medallist.

== Gymnastics career ==
In 2017, Denommée won silver on vault at Elite Canada. At the Canadian Championships, she was fifth all-around, fourth on floor and sixth on vault. At the 2017 Pan American Championships in Lima, she won silver on vault behind teammate Brooklyn Moors.

In 2018 at Elite Canada she was second on vault and third on floor. At the Canadian Championships she won vault bronze. In Guimarães, Portugal, at the World Challenge Cup, Denommée was second on balance beam, third on floor, fourth on vault and fifth on uneven bars. At the 2018 Pan American Championships, she was seventh on floor and contributed to Team Canada's fourth place finish. At the Szombathely World Challenge Cup in Hungary, she was second on vault, fourth on beam, seventh on floor and ninth on uneven bars.

In 2019 Denommée was sixth on uneven bars at Elite Canada and third on vault at the Canadian Championships.

At Elite Canada in 2020, she was seventh on uneven bars. At the International Gymnix Senior Cup in Montreal, she finished 16th all-around and eighth on uneven bars. At the 2021 Elite Canada Virtual Competition, she was the vault bronze medallist. Denommée was selected as an alternate for Canada's Tokyo 2020 Olympics team. Later that year, she was selected for the 2021 World Championships in Kitakyushu, Japan, but didn't attend after testing positive for COVID-19.

In 2022, she won three medals at the Cairo World Cup in Egypt - silver on uneven bars and bronzes on vault and floor. At the Commonwealth Games in Birmingham, Denommée won vault silver and team bronze. At the World Championships in Liverpool, she won team bronze alongside teammates Ellie Black, Sydney Turner, Denelle Pedrick, Emma Spence and Shallon Olsen - Canada's first ever World team medal. The World Championships bronze also qualified team Canada to the 2024 Paris Olympics.

== Personal life ==
She is a student at the University of Montreal.
