= Romi Brown =

Australian artistic gymnast

- Born: 25 August 2002 (age 24) Malvern, Victoria, Australia

Gymnastics career
- Discipline: Women's artistic gymnastics
- Country represented: Australia
- Club: Waverley Gymnastics Centre
- Head coach: John Hart
Medal record
Representing Australia
Commonwealth Games
Silver medal – second place	2022 Birmingham	Team

Romi Brown (born 25 August 2002) is an Australian artistic gymnast. She represented Australia at the Commonwealth Games 2022, winning a silver medal in the team event. She also represented her country at the World Championships in Liverpool the same year.

== Gymnastics career ==
Brown began competing as an elite gymnast in 2016 and finished 20th in the all-around at the Olympic Hopes Cup in Liberec, Czech Republic. Then at the 2016 Elite Gym Massilia, she finished 44th in the open all-around competition. She swept the gold medals in the all-around and all apparatus finals at the 2017 Australian Championships.

Brown became age-eligible to compete at the senior elite level in 2018. At the 2018 Australian Championships, she placed seventh in the all-around. She competed on the uneven bars at the 2019 Melbourne World Cup and finished fifth in the final. Then at the 2019 International Gymnix, she won a bronze medal with the Australian team.

Brown competed at the 2022 DTB Pokal Stuttgart and won a team bronze medal. Individually, she won a silver medal in the uneven bars final after winning the execution score tiebreaker over Nola Matthews. She placed third in the all-around at the 2022 Australian Championships. She was then selected to represent Australia at the 2022 Commonwealth Games and helped the team win the silver medal behind England. She then competed with the Australian team that placed tenth at the 2022 World Championships, making them the second reserves for the final. She advanced to the individual all-around final and finished 23rd.

Brown tore her ACL while competing at the 2023 DTB Pokal Stuttgart. She then rereptured the ACL at the 2024 Australian Championships.

== Competitive history ==
Year	Event	Team	AA	VT	UB	BB	FX
Junior
2017	Australian Championships		1st place, gold medalist(s)	1st place, gold medalist(s)	1st place, gold medalist(s)	1st place, gold medalist(s)	1st place, gold medalist(s)
2018	Australian Championships		7				
Senior
2019	Australian Championships		16				
2022	DTB Pokal Team Challenge	3rd place, bronze medalist(s)			2nd place, silver medalist(s)		
2022	Australian Championships		3rd place, bronze medalist(s)		1st place, gold medalist(s)		3rd place, bronze medalist(s)
2022	Commonwealth Games	2nd place, silver medalist(s)					8
2023	DTB Pokal Team Challenge	8					
2026	DTB Pokal Team Challenge	3rd place, bronze medalist(s)			2nd place, silver medalist(s)		
2026	DTB Pokal Mixed Cup	3rd place, bronze medalist(s)					
2026	World Championships						
