= Artistic gymnastics at the 2026 Commonwealth Games – Men's pommel horse =

Men's pommel horse at the 2026 Commonwealth Games
- Venue: SEC Hydro
- Dates: 24 July 2026 (qualification); 27 July 2026 (final)
- Competitors: 8
- Winning score: 15.000

Medalists
gold medal	Jordan Carroll	Canada
silver medal	Reuben Ward	Scotland
bronze medal	Cameron Lynn	Scotland

The Men's pommel horse gymnastics competition at the 2026 Commonwealth Games in Glasgow, Scotland was held on 27 August 2026 at SEC Hydro.

== Schedule ==
The schedule was as follows:

All times are British Summer Time (UTC+1)

Date	Time	Round
Friday 24 July 2026	09:08	Qualification
Monday 27 July 2026	14:10	Final

== Results ==
=== Qualification ===
Qualification for this apparatus final was determined within the team final.

Rank	Gymnast	Nation	Difficulty	Execution	Total	Notes
1	Reuben Ward	Scotland	5.600	8.950	14.550	Q
2	Jordan Carroll	Canada	6.000	8.550	14.550	Q
3	Rhys McClenaghan	Northern Ireland	5.500	9.000	14.500	Q
4	Marios Georgiou	Cyprus	5.100	8.550	13.650	Q
5	Ritam Malik	Australia	4.800	8.700	13.500	Q
6	Jesse Moore	Australia	5.200	8.100	13.300	Q
7	Tru Hagens	Australia	5.300	7.800	13.100	–
8	Cameron Lynn	Scotland	5.400	7.600	13.000	Q
9	Adam Tobin	England	5.100	7.850	12.950	Q
10	Joshua Nathan	England	5.400	7.500	12.900	R1
11	Elliot Vernon	Wales	4.900	7.950	12.850	R2
12	Félix Dolci	Canada	4.400	8.350	12.750	R3
13	Hamish Carter	Scotland	4.900	7.750	12.650	
14	Luke Whitehouse	England	4.400	8.000	12.400	
15	Chun Chen Ng	Malaysia	4.700	7.700	12.400	
16	Ethan Ikeda	Canada	4.800	7.550	12.350	
17	Henry Lewis	Wales	4.000	8.200	12.200	
18	Jovi Loh	Singapore	4.100	8.000	12.100	
18	Muhammad Sharul Aimy	Malaysia	4.500	7.600	12.100	
20	Alexander Niscoveanu	Wales	5.100	7.000	12.100	
21	Benjamin Foster	Australia	5.200	6.550	11.750	
22	Kyriakos Markidis	Cyprus	3.700	7.950	11.650	
23	Alexander Yolshin-Cash	England	5.400	6.150	11.550	
24	William Émard	Canada	3.900	7.500	11.400	
25	Chane Cumbermack	Trinidad and Tobago	2.300	8.900	11.200	
26	Deniyage Don Nadila Nethviru Ambul	Sri Lanka	5.200	6.000	11.200	
27	Joseph Cemlyn-Jones	Wales	4.300	6.850	11.150	
28	Yogeshwar Singh	India	4.000	7.100	11.100	
29	Asher Pua	Singapore	4.900	6.200	11.100	
30	Daniel Stoddart	New Zealand	2.200	8.650	10.850	
31	Justin Spencer	Cayman Islands	2.600	8.100	10.700	
32	Connor Sullivan	Scotland	2.800	7.900	10.700	
33	Daniel Mclean	South Africa	3.300	7.400	10.700	
34	Harry Eyres	Isle of Man	3.400	7.300	10.700	
35	Georgios Angonas	Cyprus	3.600	7.000	10.600	
36	Puthalath Swathish Kaitheri	India	3.600	6.700	10.300	
37	Neofytos Kyriakou	Cyprus	3.300	6.600	9.900	
38	Tapan Mohanty	India	2.700	7.150	9.850	
39	Clayton Bell	Jamaica	3.700	6.150	9.850	
40	Alexander Istock	New Zealand	3.500	6.300	9.800	
41	Rajib Chakma	Bangladesh	2.700	6.800	9.500	
42	Abu Saeed Rafi	Bangladesh	2.800	6.050	8.850	
43	Tapeswaranath Das	India	2.600	4.600	7.200	

=== Final ===
The results are as follows:

Rank	Gymnast	Country	Difficulty	Execution	Total
1st place, gold medalist(s)	Jordan Carroll	Canada	6.000	9.000	15.000
2nd place, silver medalist(s)	Reuben Ward	Scotland	5.700	9.266	14.966
3rd place, bronze medalist(s)	Cameron Lynn	Scotland	5.300	8.533	13.833
4	Ritam Malik	Australia	4.800	8.533	13.333
5	Marios Georgiou	Cyprus	5.400	7.700	13.100
6	Rhys McClenaghan	Northern Ireland	5.200	7.800	13.000
7	Jesse Moore	Australia	5.100	7.733	12.833
8	Adam Tobin	England	5.000	7.066	12.066
