= Artistic gymnastics at the 2026 Commonwealth Games – Men's rings =

Men's rings at the 2026 Commonwealth Games
- Venue: SEC Hydro
- Dates: 24 July 2026 (qualification); 27 July 2026 (final)
- Competitors: 8
- Winning score: 13.766

Medalists
gold medal	Félix Dolci	Canada
silver medal	William Émard	Canada
bronze medal	James Hardy	Australia

The Men's rings gymnastics competition at the 2026 Commonwealth Games in Glasgow, Scotland was held on 27 August 2026 at SEC Hydro.

== Schedule ==
The schedule was as follows:

All times are British Summer Time (UTC+1)

Date	Time	Round
Friday 24 July 2026	09:08	Qualification
Monday 27 July 2026	16:25	Final

== Results ==
=== Qualification ===
Qualification for this apparatus final was determined within the team final.

Rank	Gymnast	Nation	Difficulty	Execution	Penalty	Bonus	Total	Notes
1	William Émard	Canada	5.000	8.850			13.850	Q
2	Adam Tobin	England	4.900	8.400		0.100	13.400	Q
3	Félix Dolci	Canada	5.100	8.300			13.400	Q
4	René Cournoyer	Canada	5.000	8.350			13.350	
5	James Hardy	Australia	4.400	8.700		0.100	13.200	Q
6	Luke Whitehouse	England	4.900	8.250			13.150	Q
7	Jesse Moore	Australia	4.200	8.700		0.100	13.000	Q
8	Sokratis Pilakouris	Cyprus	4.600	8.150		0.100	12.850	Q
9	Daniel Stoddart	New Zealand	4.000	8.800			12.800	Q
10	Gabriel Langton	England	4.400	8.400			12.800	
11	Marios Georgiou	Cyprus	4.600	8.150			12.750	R1
12	Puthalath Swathish Kaitheri	India	4.600	7.850			12.450	R2
13	Ritam Malik	Australia	3.700	8.700			12.400	
14	Pavel Karnejenko	Scotland	4.900	7.500			12.400	R3
15	Reuben Ward	Scotland	3.500	8.700		0.100	12.300	
16	Joshua Nathan	England	3.200	8.950		0.100	12.250	
17	Ethan Ikeda	Canada	3.400	8.750		0.100	12.250	
18	Tapan Mohanty	India	4.100	8.000			12.100	
18	Henry Lewis	Wales	4.200	7.900			12.100	
20	Georgios Angonas	Cyprus	3.500	8.500			12.000	
21	Benjamin Foster (gymnast)Benjamin Foster	Australia	2.900	8.900			11.800	
22	Cameron Lynn	Scotland	4.200	7.600			11.800	
23	Alexander Niscoveanu	Wales	3.700	8.050			11.750	
24	Elliot Vernon	Wales	3.000	8.600		0.100	11.700	
25	Hamish Carter	Scotland	4.800	6.900			11.700	
26	Kyriakos Markidis	Cyprus	3.300	8.350			11.650	
27	Clayton Bell	Jamaica	3.300	8.250		0.100	11.650	
28	Jovi Loh	Singapore	3.200	8.300			11.500	
29	Yogeshwar Singh	India	3.400	8.100			11.500	
30	Tapeswaranath Das	India	2.800	8.300			11.100	
31	Chane Cumbermack	Trinidad and Tobago	3.100	7.900			11.000	
32	Rajib Chakma	Bangladesh	2.900	8.100	-0.300		10.700	
33	Justin Spencer	Cayman Islands	2.300	8.350	-0.300		10.350	
34	Harry Eyres	Isle of Man	2.500	7.850			10.350	
35	Daniel Mclean	South Africa	2.300	7.250			9.550	
36	Shishir Ahmed	Bangladesh	2.000	7.250	-0.300		8.950	
37	Asher Pua	Singapore	2.900	8.000	-3.000		7.900	
38	Abu Saeed Rafi	Bangladesh	1.400	7.800	-3.300		5.900	
39	Shahzad Ali	Pakistan	1.300	6.200	-4.300		3.200	

=== Final ===
The results are as follows:

Rank	Gymnast	Country	Difficulty	Execution	Bonus	Total
1st place, gold medalist(s)	Félix Dolci	Canada	5.000	8.666	0.1	13.766
2nd place, silver medalist(s)	William Émard	Canada	5.000	8.600		13.600
3rd place, bronze medalist(s)	James Hardy	Australia	4.400	9.000	0.1	13.500
4	Sokratis Pilakouris	Cyprus	4.800	8.566	0.1	13.466
5	Luke Whitehouse	England	4.900	8.200		13.100
6	Adam Tobin	England	4.900	8.166		13.066
7	Daniel Stoddart	New Zealand	4.000	8.766	0.1	12.866
8	Jesse Moore	Australia	3.500	8.033		11.533
