= Artistic gymnastics at the 2026 Commonwealth Games – Men's floor =

Gymnastics event

Men's floor at the 2026 Commonwealth Games
- Venue: SEC Hydro, Glasgow
- Dates: 24 July 2026 (qualification); 27 July 2026 (final)
- Competitors: 8
- Winning score: 14.566

Medalists
| gold medal | Luke Whitehouse | England |
| silver medal | René Cournoyer | Canada |
| bronze medal | James Hardy | Australia |

The Men's floor gymnastics competition at the 2026 Commonwealth Games in Glasgow, Scotland was held on 27 July 2026 at SEC Hydro. The event was won by England's Luke Whitehouse.

== Schedule ==
The schedule was as follows:

All times are British Summer Time (UTC+1)

| Date | Time | Round |
|---|---|---|
| Friday 24 July 2026 | 09:08 | Qualification |
| Monday 27 July 2026 | 13:00 | Final |

== Results ==
=== Qualification ===
Qualification for this apparatus final was determined within the team final.

| Rank | Gymnast | Nation | Difficulty | Execution | Penalty | Bonus | Total | Notes |
|---|---|---|---|---|---|---|---|---|
| 1 | Luke Whitehouse | England | 6.100 | 8.300 | | | 14.400 | Q |
| 2 | Félix Dolci | Canada | 5.500 | 8.200 | | | 13.700 | Q |
| 3 | René Cournoyer | Canada | 5.000 | 8.600 | -0.100 | | 13.500 | Q |
| 4 | Daniel McLean | South Africa | 4.500 | 8.850 | | | 13.350 | Q |
| 5 | Muhammad Sharul Aimy | Malaysia | 4.900 | 8.350 | | | 13.250 | Q |
| 6 | Reuben Ward | Scotland | 5.100 | 8.150 | -0.100 | | 13.150 | Q |
| 7 | James Hardy | Australia | 5.000 | 8.150 | | | 13.150 | Q |
| 8 | Joshua Nathan | England | 4.800 | 8.300 | | | 13.100 | Q |
| 9 | William Fu-Allen | New Zealand | 5.100 | 7.950 | | | 13.050 | R1 |
| 10 | Marios Georgiou | Cyprus | 4.900 | 8.200 | -0.100 | | 13.000 | R2 |
| 11 | Eamon Montgomery | Northern Ireland | 5.500 | 7.600 | -0.100 | | 13.000 | R3 |
| 12 | Gabriel Langton | England | 4.900 | 8.150 | -0.100 | | 12.950 | |
| 13 | Jacob Edwards | Wales | 5.200 | 7.750 | -0.200 | 0.100 | 12.850 | |
| 14 | Hamish Carter | Scotland | 5.100 | 8.100 | -0.400 | | 12.800 | |
| 15 | Ritam Malik | Australia | 4.600 | 8.250 | -0.100 | | 12.750 | |
| 16 | Benjamin Foster | Australia | 4.400 | 8.250 | -0.100 | | 12.550 | |
| 17 | Adam Tobin | England | 5.100 | 7.750 | -0.400 | | 12.450 | |
| 18 | Clayton Bell | Jamaica | 5.000 | 7.450 | | | 12.450 | |
| 18 | Cameron Lynn | Scotland | 5.000 | 7.450 | | | 12.450 | |
| 20 | Neofytos Kyriakou | Cyprus | 4.500 | 7.900 | | | 12.400 | |
| 21 | William Émard | Canada | 5.100 | 7.850 | -0.600 | | 12.350 | |
| 22 | Connor Sullivan | Scotland | 4.900 | 7.750 | -0.300 | | 12.350 | |
| 23 | Rhys McClenaghan | Northern Ireland | 5.100 | 7.350 | -0.100 | | 12.350 | |
| 24 | Elliot Vernon | Wales | 4.500 | 7.700 | | 0.100 | 12.300 | |
| 25 | Daniel Stoddart | New Zealand | 4.700 | 7.500 | | | 12.200 | |
| 26 | Alexander Niscoveanu | Wales | 5.100 | 7.450 | -0.400 | | 12.150 | |
| 27 | Tapan Mohanty | India | 4.700 | 7.450 | | | 12.150 | |
| 28 | Henry Lewis | Wales | 5.000 | 7.350 | -0.300 | | 12.050 | |
| 29 | Jesse Moore | Australia | 4.900 | 6.900 | | | 11.800 | |
| 30 | Jovi Loh | Singapore | 4.800 | 7.350 | -0.400 | | 11.750 | |
| 31 | Harry Eyres | Isle of Man | 4.500 | 7.450 | -0.300 | | 11.650 | |
| 32 | Justin Spencer | Cayman Islands | 3.000 | 8.450 | | | 11.450 | |
| 33 | Deniyage Don Nadila Nethviru Ambul | Sri Lanka | 4.400 | 7.100 | -0.100 | | 11.400 | |
| 34 | Chane Cumbermack | Trinidad and Tobago | 4.800 | 7.150 | -0.900 | | 11.050 | |
| 35 | Kyriakos Markidis | Cyprus | 4.500 | 7.200 | -0.700 | | 11.000 | |
| 36 | Georgios Angonas | Cyprus | 3.600 | 7.450 | -0.300 | | 10.750 | |
| 37 | Yogeshwar Singh | India | 5.000 | 6.100 | -0.500 | | 10.600 | |
| 38 | Rajib Chakma | Bangladesh | 4.400 | 6.150 | -0.100 | | 10.450 | |
| 39 | Ethan Ikeda | Canada | 4.200 | 6.500 | -0.300 | | 10.400 | |
| 40 | Shishir Ahmed | Bangladesh | 2.900 | 7.650 | -0.300 | | 10.250 | |
| 41 | Asher Pua | Singapore | 4.200 | 6.400 | -0.600 | | 10.000 | |
| 42 | Tapeswaranath Das | India | 4.600 | 4.900 | | | 9.500 | |
| 43 | Abu Saeed Rafi | Bangladesh | 2.500 | 6.700 | -3.900 | | 5.300 | |

=== Final ===
The results are as follows:

| Rank | Gymnast | Country | Difficulty | Execution | Penalty | Bonus | Total |
|---|---|---|---|---|---|---|---|
| 1st place, gold medalist(s) | Luke Whitehouse | England | 6.100 | 8.466 | | | 14.566 |
| 2nd place, silver medalist(s) | René Cournoyer | Canada | 5.100 | 8.866 | | | 13.966 |
| 3rd place, bronze medalist(s) | James Hardy | Australia | 5.000 | 8.633 | -0.2 | | 13.433 |
| 4 | Félix Dolci | Canada | 5.300 | 7.833 | | 0.1 | 13.233 |
| 5 | Daniel McLean | South Africa | 4.500 | 8.433 | | | 12.933 |
| 6 | Reuben Ward | Scotland | 5.300 | 7.900 | -0.3 | | 12.900 |
| 7 | Joshua Nathan | England | 4.800 | 7.966 | | | 12.766 |
| 8 | Muhammad Sharul Aimy | Malaysia | 4.800 | 7.666 | | 0.1 | 12.566 |
