= Artistic gymnastics at the 2026 Commonwealth Games – Men's individual all-around =

Gymnastics 2026 men's competition in Glasgow

Men's individual all-around at the 2026 Commonwealth Games
- Venue: SEC Hydro
- Dates: 24 July 2026 (qualification); 26 July 2026 (final)
- Competitors: 18 from 12 nations
- Winning score: 79.650

Medalists
gold medal	Reuben Ward	Scotland
silver medal	Félix Dolci	Canada
bronze medal	Jesse Moore	Australia

The Men's individual all-around gymnastics competition at the 2026 Commonwealth Games in Glasgow, Scotland was held on 26 July 2026 at the SEC Hydro. The event was won by Scotland's Reuben Ward, the first Scot to ever win the men's individual all-around event.

== Schedule ==
The schedule was as follows:

All times are British Summer Time (UTC+1)

Date	Time	Round
Friday 24 July 2026		Qualification
Sunday 26 July 2026		Final

== Results ==
=== Qualification ===
Qualification for this all-around final was determined in parallel with the team final.

Rank	Name	Country	Floor (gymnastics)	Pommel horse	Rings (gymnastics)	Vault (gymnastics)	Parallel bars	Horizontal bar	Total	Notes
1	Félix Dolci	Canada	13.700	12.750	13.400	14.000	13.550	14.250	81.650	Q
2	Marios Georgiou	Cyprus	13.000	13.650	12.750	14.000	13.800	13.750	80.950	Q
3	Reuben Ward	Scotland	13.150	14.550	12.300	13.000	13.500	13.150	79.650	Q
4	Adam Tobin	England	12.450	12.950	13.400	13.950	13.800	13.100	79.650	Q
5	William Émard	Canada	12.350	11.400	13.850	14.100	13.650	13.500	78.850	Q
6	Luke Whitehouse	England	14.400	12.400	13.150	14.150	12.900	11.700	78.700	Q
7	Jesse Moore	Australia	11.800	13.300	13.000	13.900	13.500	12.650	78.150	Q
8	Ritam Malik	Australia	12.750	13.500	12.400	13.500	11.950	13.450	77.550	Q
9	Cameron Lynn	Scotland	12.450	13.000	11.800	13.650	13.050	13.500	77.450	Q
10	Hamish Carter	Scotland	12.800	12.650	11.700	13.350	13.100	12.900	76.500	–
11	Elliot Vernon	Wales	12.300	12.850	11.700	13.150	13.650	12.700	76.350	Q
12	Alexander Niscoveanu	Wales	12.150	12.100	11.750	12.550	13.150	13.200	74.900	Q
13	Daniel Stoddart	New Zealand	12.200	10.850	12.800	13.300	11.200	12.500	72.850	Q
14	Benjamin Foster	Australia	12.550	11.750	11.800	12.500	12.750	11.100	72.450	–
15	Jovi Loh	Singapore	11.750	12.100	11.500	12.950	12.750	11.350	72.400	Q
16	Georgios Angonas	Cyprus	10.750	10.600	12.000	13.350	13.200	11.900	71.800	Q
17	Tapan Mohanty	India	12.150	9.850	12.100	13.200	12.700	11.700	71.700	Q
18	Yogeshwar Singh	India	10.600	11.100	11.500	12.800	12.750	12.650	71.400	Q
19	Kyriakos Markidis	Cyprus	11.000	11.650	11.650	13.850	11.850	10.350	70.350	–
20	Ethan Ikeda	Canada	10.400	12.350	12.250	13.100	11.300	10.950	70.350	–
21	Chane Cumbermack	Trinidad and Tobago	11.050	11.200	11.000	13.900	11.000	12.050	70.200	Q
22	Clayton Bell	Jamaica	12.450	9.850	11.650	13.300	11.700	11.100	70.050	Q
23	Harry Eyres	Isle of Man	11.650	10.700	10.350	12.800	10.950	10.100	66.550	R1
24	Justin Spencer	Cayman Islands	11.450	10.700	10.350	10.800	11.450	10.350	65.100	R2
25	Daniel McLean	South Africa	13.350	10.700	9.550	12.200	7.850	9.950	63.600	R3
26	Asher Pua	Singapore	10.000	11.100	7.900	12.450	10.650	10.650	62.750	R4
27	Tapeswaranath Das	India	9.500	7.200	11.100	11.750	10.000	11.450	61.000	
28	Rajib Chakma	Bangladesh	10.450	9.500	10.700	11.650	9.550	8.600	60.450	
29	Abu Saeed Rafi	Bangladesh	5.300	8.850	5.900	11.650	10.000	9.450	51.150	
30	Shishir Ahmed	Bangladesh	10.250	2.050	8.950	11.700	9.300	7.500	49.750	
—	Alexander Istock	New Zealand	DNS	9.800	DNS	DNS	11.600	13.200	DNF	DNF
—	Luqman Al Hafiz Zulfa	Malaysia	DNS	DNS	DNS	DNS	DNS	DNS	DNS	DNS

=== Final ===
The final was held on 26 July 2026. Harry Eyres from the Isle of Man replaced the withdrawn Indian gymnast, Yogeshwar Singh. The results were as follows:

Position	Gymnast	Nation	Floor (gymnastics)	Pommel horse	Rings (gymnastics)	Vault (gymnastics)	Parallel bars	Horizontal bar	Total
1st place, gold medalist(s)	Reuben Ward	Scotland	12.800	14.100	12.250	14.050	13.750	12.700	79.650
2nd place, silver medalist(s)	Félix Dolci	Canada	13.450	9.500	13.850	14.200	13.950	14.500	79.450
3rd place, bronze medalist(s)	Jesse Moore	Australia	12.600	12.500	12.550	13.850	13.400	14.100	79.000
4	Marios Georgiou	Cyprus	13.150	12.800	12.350	13.500	13.500	13.650	78.950
5	Adam Tobin	England	12.550	12.700	13.050	14.150	13.300	13.050	78.800
6	Ritam Malik	Australia	12.900	13.300	12.400	13.350	12.450	13.000	77.400
7	Luke Whitehouse	England	12.950	11.550	12.650	14.000	13.250	12.900	77.300
8	William Émard	Canada	13.100	11.850	13.750	13.750	12.500	12.300	77.250
9	Elliot Vernon	Wales	12.800	13.400	12.450	13.100	11.850	13.000	76.600
10	Cameron Lynn	Scotland	12.700	11.800	12.650	13.700	11.600	12.900	75.350
11	Alexander Niscoveanu	Wales	12.800	12.450	11.900	13.750	10.350	12.800	74.050
12	Daniel Stoddart	New Zealand	12.850	10.450	12.550	12.650	12.200	12.850	73.550
13	Chane Cumbermack	Trinidad and Tobago	12.250	10.900	11.300	13.600	12.250	12.150	72.450
14	Georgios Angonas	Cyprus	10.400	10.200	11.700	13.000	13.100	12.350	70.750
15	Tapan Mohanty	India	11.850	9.500	12.000	12.700	12.450	11.600	70.100
16	Harry Eyres	Isle of Man	11.850	10.950	10.900	10.550	10.950	9.800	65.000
17	Clayton Bell	Jamaica	12.650	9.200	10.000	13.450	7.950	11.150	64.400
DNF	Jovi Loh	Singapore	–	11.300	13.150	11.750	–	–	–
