= Artistic gymnastics at the 2026 Commonwealth Games – Men's team all-around =

Men's team all-around at the 2026 Commonwealth Games
- Venue: The Arena
- Dates: 24 July 2026
- Competitors: 56 from 19 nations
- Winning score: 241.400

Medalists
gold medal	Jordan Carroll; René Cournoyer; Félix Dolci; William Émard; Ethan Ikeda	Canada
silver medal	Gabriel Langton; Joshua Nathan; Adam Tobin; Luke Whitehouse; Alex Yolshin-Cash	England
bronze medal	Benjamin Foster; Tru Hagens; James Hardy; Ritam Malik; Jesse Moore	Australia

The men's team all-around gymnastics competition at the 2026 Commonwealth Games in Glasgow, Scotland was held on 24 July 2026 at The Arena.

This event formed part of the qualification standings for the individual all-around and apparatus events, with team scores taken from the best three scores on each apparatus during qualification. All male gymnasts take part in the qualification competition, and nations with three or more gymnasts in the event are then credited as a team.

Twelve eligible teams were entered, consisting of 49 gymnasts, with an additional seven individual gymnasts from an additional seven nations attempting to qualify for all-around and apparatus finals.

Canada won the gold medal, taking the title for the first time in twenty years, and breaking the 12 year streak of England, who took silver. Australia won a tight battle for the bronze medal.

== Teams ==
The following teams have entered three or more male gymnasts into the all around qualifying competition, and are thereby eligible for the team final (number of gymnasts in team in brackets):

- Singapore (3)
- Malaysia (3)
- India (4)
- Northern Ireland (4)
- Bangladesh (3)
- New Zealand (4)
- England (5)
- Scotland (5)
- Wales (5)
- Canada (5)
- Cyprus (5)
- Australia (5)

Of these twelve possible teams, Northern Ireland, who lost Chester Enriquez to injury on the eve of competition chose not to contest the team event, and Malaysia were also unable to complete.

The following nations entered individual gymnasts in the all-around and apparatus qualifying competition, but are not entering the team competition:

- Isle of Man (1)
- Jamaica (1)
- Sri Lanka (1)
- Cayman Islands (1)
- Trinidad and Tobago (1)
- South Africa (1)
- Pakistan (1)

== Schedule ==
All times are British Summer Time (UTC+1)

Date	Time	Round
Friday 24 July 2026	09:08	Competition

Competition order

Session	Rotation 1	Rotation 2	Rotation 3
Morning	Singapore and individual gymnast representing Isle of Man	Malaysia and individual gymnast representing Pakistan	Individual gymnasts representing Jamaica and Trinidad and Tobago
Afternoon	India and individual gymnasts representing Cayman Islands and South Africa	Northern Ireland and individual gymnast representing Sri Lanka	Bangladesh and New Zealand
Evening	England and Scotland	Wales and Canada	Cyprus and Australia

== Results ==
=== Team competition ===
Rank	Country	Floor (gymnastics)	Pommel horse	Rings (gymnastics)	Vault (gymnastics)	Parallel bars	Horizontal bar	Total
1st place, gold medalist(s)	Canada	39.550	39.650	40.600	41.950	40.350	39.300	241.400
1st place, gold medalist(s)	Jordan Carroll		14.550					241.400
1st place, gold medalist(s)	René Cournoyer	13.500		13.350	13.850	13.150	11.550	241.400
1st place, gold medalist(s)	Félix Dolci	13.700	12.750	13.400	14.000	13.550	14.250	241.400
1st place, gold medalist(s)	William Émard	12.350	~~11.400~~	13.850	14.100	13.650	13.500	241.400
1st place, gold medalist(s)	Ethan Ikeda	~~10.400~~	12.350	~~12.250~~	~~13.100~~	~~11.300~~	~~10.950~~	241.400
2nd place, silver medalist(s)	England	40.450	38.250	39.350	41.350	40.800	38.050	238.250
2nd place, silver medalist(s)	Gabriel Langton	12.950		12.800	~~12.350~~	~~12.600~~	~~3.350~~	238.250
2nd place, silver medalist(s)	Joshua Nathan	13.100	12.900	~~12.250~~	13.250			238.250
2nd place, silver medalist(s)	Adam Tobin	~~12.450~~	12.950	13.400	13.950	13.800	13.100	238.250
2nd place, silver medalist(s)	Luke Whitehouse	14.400	12.400	13.150	14.150	12.900	11.700	238.250
2nd place, silver medalist(s)	Alex Yolshin-Cash		~~11.550~~			14.100	13.250	238.250
3rd place, bronze medalist(s)	Australia	38.450	39.300	38.600	41.150	39.100	38.450	235.650
3rd place, bronze medalist(s)	Benjamin Foster	12.550	~~11.750~~	~~11.800~~	~~12.500~~	12.750	~~11.100~~	235.650
3rd place, bronze medalist(s)	Tru Hagens		13.100					235.650
3rd place, bronze medalist(s)	James Hardy	13.150		13.200	13.750	12.850	12.350	235.650
3rd place, bronze medalist(s)	Ritam Malik	12.750	13.500	12.400	13.500	~~11.950~~	13.450	235.650
3rd place, bronze medalist(s)	Jesse Moore	~~11.800~~	13.300	13.000	13.900	13.500	12.650	235.650
4	Scotland	38.400	40.200	36.500	40.000	39.650	39.550	234.300
4	Hamish Carter	12.800	12.650	~~11.700~~	13.350	13.100	12.900	234.300
4	Pavel Karnejenko			12.400		~~12.100~~		234.300
4	Cameron Lynn	12.450	13.000	11.800	13.650	13.050	13.500	234.300
4	Connor Sullivan	~~12.350~~	~~10.700~~		~~12.400~~		~~12.400~~	234.300
4	Reuben Ward	13.150	14.550	12.300	13.000	13.500	13.150	234.300
5	Cyprus	36.400	35.900	37.600	41.700	38.850	37.900	228.350
5	Georgios Angonas	~~10.750~~	10.600	12.000	~~13.350~~	13.200	11.900	228.350
5	Marios Georgiou	13.000	13.650	12.750	14.000	13.800	13.750	228.350
5	Kyriakos Markidis	11.000	11.650	~~11.650~~	13.850	11.850	~~10.350~~	228.350
5	Neofytos Kyriakou	12.400	~~9.900~~		13.850	~~11.150~~	12.250	228.350
5	Sokratis Pilakouris			12.850				228.350
6	Wales	37.300	37.150	35.550	39.800	39.400	37.800	227.000
6	Joe Cemlyn-Jones		~~11.150~~			12.600	~~11.500~~	227.000
6	Jacob Edwards	12.850			13.750	~~11.600~~	11.900	227.000
6	Henry Lewis	~~12.050~~	12.200	12.100	12.900			227.000
6	Alexander Niscoveanu	12.150	12.100	11.750	~~12.550~~	13.150	13.200	227.000
6	Elliot Vernon	12.300	12.850	11.700	13.150	13.650	12.700	227.000
7	India	32.250	31.250	36.050	37.750	35.450	35.800	208.550
7	Yogeshwar Singh	10.600	11.100	11.500	12.800	12.750	12.650	208.550
7	Tapeshwarnath Das	9.500	~~7.200~~	~~11.100~~	11.750	10.000	11.450	208.550
7	Tapan Mohanty	12.150	9.850	12.100	13.200	12.700	11.700	208.550
7	Swathish Kaitheri Puthalath		10.300	12.450				208.550
8	Bangladesh	26.000	20.400	25.550	35.000	28.850	25.550	161.350
8	Shishir Ahmed	10.250	2.050	8.950	11.700	9.300	7.500	161.350
8	Rajib Chakma	10.450	9.500	10.700	11.650	9.550	8.600	161.350
8	Abu Saeed Rafi	5.300	8.850	5.900	11.650	1	9.450	161.350
9	Singapore	21.750	23.200	19.400	25.400	28.950	33.250	151.950
9	Jovi Loh	11.750	12.100	11.500	12.950	12.750	11.350	151.950
9	Asher Pua	10.000	11.100	7.900	12.450	10.650	10.650	151.950
9	Abdulattif Abdul Barr					5.550	11.250	151.950
10	New Zealand	25.250	20.650	2.800	13.300	33.800	34.900	140.700
10	William Fu-Allen	13.050						140.700
10	Alex Istock	-				11.600	13.200	140.700
10	Mikhail Koudinov	-				11.000	9.200	140.700
10	Daniel Stoddart	12.200	10.850	12.800	13.300	11.200	12.500	140.700
-	Malaysia	DNF	DNF	DNS	DNF	DNF	DNS	DNF
-	Muhammad Sharul Aimy	13.250	12.100		13.750			DNF
-	Ng Chun Chen		12.400			12.850		DNF
-	Luqman Al Hafiz Zulfa	-						DNF
-	Northern Ireland							NM
-	Rhys McClenaghan	12.350	14.500					NM
-	Eamon Montgomery	13.000						NM
-	Ewan McAteer				13.750			NM
Individual competitors
	Harry Eyers (IOM)	11.650	10.700	10.350	12.800	10.950	10.100	66.550
	Clayton Bell (JAM)	12.450	9.850	11.650	13.300	11.700	11.100	70.050
	Chane Cumbernack (TTO)	11.050	11.200	11.000	13.900	11.000	12.050	70.200
	Daniel McLean (RSA)	13.350	10.700	9.550	12.200	7.850	9.950	63.600
	Justin Spencer (CAY)	11.450	10.700	10.350	10.800	11.450	10.350	65.100
	Shahzad Ali (PAK)		2.500	3.200		8.300		
	Nadila Nethviru (SRI)	11.400	11.200					

== Qualification results ==
=== Individual all-around ===
Rank	Name	Country	Floor (gymnastics)	Pommel horse	Rings (gymnastics)	Vault (gymnastics)	Parallel bars	Horizontal bar	Total	Notes
1	Félix Dolci	Canada	13.700	12.750	13.400	14.000	13.550	14.250	81.650	Q
2	Marios Georgiou	Cyprus	13.000	13.650	12.750	14.000	13.800	13.750	80.950	Q
3	Reuben Ward	Scotland	13.150	14.550	12.300	13.000	13.500	13.150	79.650	Q
4	Adam Tobin	England	12.450	12.950	13.400	13.950	13.800	13.100	79.650	Q
5	William Émard	Canada	12.350	11.400	13.850	14.100	13.650	13.500	78.850	Q
6	Luke Whitehouse	England	14.400	12.400	13.150	14.150	12.900	11.700	78.700	Q
7	Jesse Moore	Australia	11.800	13.300	13.000	13.900	13.500	12.650	78.150	Q
8	Ritam Malik	Australia	12.750	13.500	12.400	13.500	11.950	13.450	77.550	Q
9	Cameron Lynn	Scotland	12.450	13.000	11.800	13.650	13.050	13.500	77.450	Q
10	Hamish Carter	Scotland	12.800	12.650	11.700	13.350	13.100	12.900	76.500	–
11	Elliot Vernon	Wales	12.300	12.850	11.700	13.150	13.650	12.700	76.350	Q
12	Alexander Niscoveanu	Wales	12.150	12.100	11.750	12.550	13.150	13.200	74.900	Q
13	Daniel Stoddart	New Zealand	12.200	10.850	12.800	13.300	11.200	12.500	72.850	Q
14	Benjamin Foster	Australia	12.550	11.750	11.800	12.500	12.750	11.100	72.450	–
15	Jovi Loh	Singapore	11.750	12.100	11.500	12.950	12.750	11.350	72.400	Q
16	Georgios Angonas	Cyprus	10.750	10.600	12.000	13.350	13.200	11.900	71.800	Q
17	Tapan Mohanty	India	12.150	9.850	12.100	13.200	12.700	11.700	71.700	Q
18	Yogeshwar Singh	India	10.600	11.100	11.500	12.800	12.750	12.650	71.400	Q
19	Kyriakos Markidis	Cyprus	11.000	11.650	11.650	13.850	11.850	10.350	70.350	–
20	Ethan Ikeda	Canada	10.400	12.350	12.250	13.100	11.300	10.950	70.350	–
21	Chane Cumbermack	Trinidad and Tobago	11.050	11.200	11.000	13.900	11.000	12.050	70.200	Q
22	Clayton Bell	Jamaica	12.450	9.850	11.650	13.300	11.700	11.100	70.050	Q
23	Harry Eyres	Isle of Man	11.650	10.700	10.350	12.800	10.950	10.100	66.550	R1
24	Justin Spencer	Cayman Islands	11.450	10.700	10.350	10.800	11.450	10.350	65.100	R2
25	Daniel McLean	South Africa	13.350	10.700	9.550	12.200	7.850	9.950	63.600	R3
26	Asher Pua	Singapore	10.000	11.100	7.900	12.450	10.650	10.650	62.750	R4
27	Tapeswaranath Das	India	9.500	7.200	11.100	11.750	10.000	11.450	61.000	
28	Rajib Chakma	Bangladesh	10.450	9.500	10.700	11.650	9.550	8.600	60.450	
29	Abu Saeed Rafi	Bangladesh	5.300	8.850	5.900	11.650	10.000	9.450	51.150	
30	Shishir Ahmed	Bangladesh	10.250	2.050	8.950	11.700	9.300	7.500	49.750	
—	Alexander Istock	New Zealand	DNS	9.800	DNS	DNS	11.600	13.200	DNF	DNF
—	Luqman Al Hafiz Zulfa	Malaysia	DNS	DNS	DNS	DNS	DNS	DNS	DNS	DNS

=== Floor ===
Rank	Gymnast	Nation	Difficulty	Execution	Penalty	Bonus	Total	Notes
1	Luke Whitehouse	England	6.100	8.300			14.400	Q
2	Félix Dolci	Canada	5.500	8.200			13.700	Q
3	René Cournoyer	Canada	5.000	8.600	-0.100		13.500	Q
4	Daniel McLean	South Africa	4.500	8.850			13.350	Q
5	Muhammad Sharul Aimy	Malaysia	4.900	8.350			13.250	Q
6	Reuben Ward	Scotland	5.100	8.150	-0.100		13.150	Q
7	James Hardy	Australia	5.000	8.150			13.150	Q
8	Joshua Nathan	England	4.800	8.300			13.100	Q
9	William Fu-Allen	New Zealand	5.100	7.950			13.050	R1
10	Marios Georgiou	Cyprus	4.900	8.200	-0.100		13.000	R2
11	Eamon Montgomery	Northern Ireland	5.500	7.600	-0.100		13.000	R3
12	Gabriel Langton	England	4.900	8.150	-0.100		12.950	
13	Jacob Edwards	Wales	5.200	7.750	-0.200	0.100	12.850	
14	Hamish Carter	Scotland	5.100	8.100	-0.400		12.800	
15	Ritam Malik	Australia	4.600	8.250	-0.100		12.750	
16	Benjamin Foster	Australia	4.400	8.250	-0.100		12.550	
17	Adam Tobin	England	5.100	7.750	-0.400		12.450	
18	Clayton Bell	Jamaica	5.000	7.450			12.450	
18	Cameron Lynn	Scotland	5.000	7.450			12.450	
20	Neofytos Kyriakou	Cyprus	4.500	7.900			12.400	
21	William Émard	Canada	5.100	7.850	-0.600		12.350	
22	Connor Sullivan	Scotland	4.900	7.750	-0.300		12.350	
23	Rhys McClenaghan	Northern Ireland	5.100	7.350	-0.100		12.350	
24	Elliot Vernon	Wales	4.500	7.700		0.100	12.300	
25	Daniel Stoddart	New Zealand	4.700	7.500			12.200	
26	Alexander Niscoveanu	Wales	5.100	7.450	-0.400		12.150	
27	Tapan Mohanty	India	4.700	7.450			12.150	
28	Henry Lewis	Wales	5.000	7.350	-0.300		12.050	
29	Jesse Moore	Australia	4.900	6.900			11.800	
30	Jovi Loh	Singapore	4.800	7.350	-0.400		11.750	
31	Harry Eyres	Isle of Man	4.500	7.450	-0.300		11.650	
32	Justin Spencer	Cayman Islands	3.000	8.450			11.450	
33	Deniyage Don Nadila Nethviru Ambul	Sri Lanka	4.400	7.100	-0.100		11.400	
34	Chane Cumbermack	Trinidad and Tobago	4.800	7.150	-0.900		11.050	
35	Kyriakos Markidis	Cyprus	4.500	7.200	-0.700		11.000	
36	Georgios Angonas	Cyprus	3.600	7.450	-0.300		10.750	
37	Yogeshwar Singh	India	5.000	6.100	-0.500		10.600	
38	Rajib Chakma	Bangladesh	4.400	6.150	-0.100		10.450	
39	Ethan Ikeda	Canada	4.200	6.500	-0.300		10.400	
40	Shishir Ahmed	Bangladesh	2.900	7.650	-0.300		10.250	
41	Asher Pua	Singapore	4.200	6.400	-0.600		10.000	
42	Tapeswaranath Das	India	4.600	4.900			9.500	
43	Abu Saeed Rafi	Bangladesh	2.500	6.700	-3.900		5.300	

=== Pommel horse ===
Rank	Gymnast	Nation	Difficulty	Execution	Total	Notes
1	Reuben Ward	Scotland	5.600	8.950	14.550	Q
2	Jordan Carroll	Canada	6.000	8.550	14.550	Q
3	Rhys McClenaghan	Northern Ireland	5.500	9.000	14.500	Q
4	Marios Georgiou	Cyprus	5.100	8.550	13.650	Q
5	Ritam Malik	Australia	4.800	8.700	13.500	Q
6	Jesse Moore	Australia	5.200	8.100	13.300	Q
7	Tru Hagens	Australia	5.300	7.800	13.100	–
8	Cameron Lynn	Scotland	5.400	7.600	13.000	Q
9	Adam Tobin	England	5.100	7.850	12.950	Q
10	Joshua Nathan	England	5.400	7.500	12.900	R1
11	Elliot Vernon	Wales	4.900	7.950	12.850	R2
12	Félix Dolci	Canada	4.400	8.350	12.750	R3
13	Hamish Carter	Scotland	4.900	7.750	12.650	
14	Luke Whitehouse	England	4.400	8.000	12.400	
15	Chun Chen Ng	Malaysia	4.700	7.700	12.400	
16	Ethan Ikeda	Canada	4.800	7.550	12.350	
17	Henry Lewis	Wales	4.000	8.200	12.200	
18	Jovi Loh	Singapore	4.100	8.000	12.100	
18	Muhammad Sharul Aimy	Malaysia	4.500	7.600	12.100	
20	Alexander Niscoveanu	Wales	5.100	7.000	12.100	
21	Benjamin Foster	Australia	5.200	6.550	11.750	
22	Kyriakos Markidis	Cyprus	3.700	7.950	11.650	
23	Alexander Yolshin-Cash	England	5.400	6.150	11.550	
24	William Émard	Canada	3.900	7.500	11.400	
25	Chane Cumbermack	Trinidad and Tobago	2.300	8.900	11.200	
26	Deniyage Don Nadila Nethviru Ambul	Sri Lanka	5.200	6.000	11.200	
27	Joseph Cemlyn-Jones	Wales	4.300	6.850	11.150	
28	Yogeshwar Singh	India	4.000	7.100	11.100	
29	Asher Pua	Singapore	4.900	6.200	11.100	
30	Daniel Stoddart	New Zealand	2.200	8.650	10.850	
31	Justin Spencer	Cayman Islands	2.600	8.100	10.700	
32	Connor Sullivan	Scotland	2.800	7.900	10.700	
33	Daniel Mclean	South Africa	3.300	7.400	10.700	
34	Harry Eyres	Isle of Man	3.400	7.300	10.700	
35	Georgios Angonas	Cyprus	3.600	7.000	10.600	
36	Puthalath Swathish Kaitheri	India	3.600	6.700	10.300	
37	Neofytos Kyriakou	Cyprus	3.300	6.600	9.900	
38	Tapan Mohanty	India	2.700	7.150	9.850	
39	Clayton Bell	Jamaica	3.700	6.150	9.850	
40	Alexander Istock	New Zealand	3.500	6.300	9.800	
41	Rajib Chakma	Bangladesh	2.700	6.800	9.500	
42	Abu Saeed Rafi	Bangladesh	2.800	6.050	8.850	
43	Tapeswaranath Das	India	2.600	4.600	7.200	

=== Rings ===
Rank	Gymnast	Nation	Difficulty	Execution	Penalty	Bonus	Total	Notes
1	William Émard	Canada	5.000	8.850			13.850	Q
2	Adam Tobin	England	4.900	8.400		0.100	13.400	Q
3	Félix Dolci	Canada	5.100	8.300			13.400	Q
4	René Cournoyer	Canada	5.000	8.350			13.350	–
5	James Hardy	Australia	4.400	8.700		0.100	13.200	Q
6	Luke Whitehouse	England	4.900	8.250			13.150	Q
7	Jesse Moore	Australia	4.200	8.700		0.100	13.000	Q
8	Sokratis Pilakouris	Cyprus	4.600	8.150		0.100	12.850	Q
9	Daniel Stoddart	New Zealand	4.000	8.800			12.800	Q
10	Gabriel Langton	England	4.400	8.400			12.800	–
11	Marios Georgiou	Cyprus	4.600	8.150			12.750	R1
12	Puthalath Swathish Kaitheri	India	4.600	7.850			12.450	R2
13	Ritam Malik	Australia	3.700	8.700			12.400	–
14	Pavel Karnejenko	Scotland	4.900	7.500			12.400	R3
15	Reuben Ward	Scotland	3.500	8.700		0.100	12.300	
16	Joshua Nathan	England	3.200	8.950		0.100	12.250	
17	Ethan Ikeda	Canada	3.400	8.750		0.100	12.250	
18	Tapan Mohanty	India	4.100	8.000			12.100	
18	Henry Lewis	Wales	4.200	7.900			12.100	
20	Georgios Angonas	Cyprus	3.500	8.500			12.000	
21	Benjamin Foster	Australia	2.900	8.900			11.800	
22	Cameron Lynn	Scotland	4.200	7.600			11.800	
23	Alexander Niscoveanu	Wales	3.700	8.050			11.750	
24	Elliot Vernon	Wales	3.000	8.600		0.100	11.700	
25	Hamish Carter	Scotland	4.800	6.900			11.700	
26	Kyriakos Markidis	Cyprus	3.300	8.350			11.650	
27	Clayton Bell	Jamaica	3.300	8.250		0.100	11.650	
28	Jovi Loh	Singapore	3.200	8.300			11.500	
29	Yogeshwar Singh	India	3.400	8.100			11.500	
30	Tapeswaranath Das	India	2.800	8.300			11.100	
31	Chane Cumbermack	Trinidad and Tobago	3.100	7.900			11.000	
32	Rajib Chakma	Bangladesh	2.900	8.100	-0.300		10.700	
33	Justin Spencer	Cayman Islands	2.300	8.350	-0.300		10.350	
34	Harry Eyres	Isle of Man	2.500	7.850			10.350	
35	Daniel McLean	South Africa	2.300	7.250			9.550	
36	Shishir Ahmed	Bangladesh	2.000	7.250	-0.300		8.950	
37	Asher Pua	Singapore	2.900	8.000	-3.000		7.900	
38	Abu Saeed Rafi	Bangladesh	1.400	7.800	-3.300		5.900	
39	Shahzad Ali	Pakistan	1.300	6.200	-4.300		3.200	

=== Vault ===
The results are as follows:

Rank	Gymnast	Nation	Vaults				Total	Notes
Rank	Gymnast	Nation	Difficulty	Execution	Penalty	Total	Total	Notes
1	Félix Dolci	Canada	4.800	9.200		14.000	14.100	Q
1	Félix Dolci	Canada	5.200	9.000		14.200	14.100	Q
2	Luke Whitehouse	England	5.200	8.950		14.150	14.000	Q
2	Luke Whitehouse	England	4.800	9.050		13.850	14.000	Q
3	James Hardy	Australia	4.800	9.050	-0.100	13.750	13.755	Q
3	James Hardy	Australia	4.800	9.000		13.800	13.755	Q
4	Muhammad Sharul Aimy	Malaysia	4.800	8.950		13.750	13.725	Q
4	Muhammad Sharul Aimy	Malaysia	4.800	8.900		13.700	13.725	Q
5	Ewan Mcateer	Northern Ireland	4.800	8.950		13.750	13.650	Q
5	Ewan Mcateer	Northern Ireland	4.400	9.150		13.550	13.650	Q
6	Neofytos Kyriakou	Cyprus	4.800	9.050		13.850	13.625	Q
6	Neofytos Kyriakou	Cyprus	4.400	9.000		13.400	13.625	Q
7	Kyriakos Markidis	Cyprus	4.800	9.050		13.850	13.500	Q
7	Kyriakos Markidis	Cyprus	4.400	8.750		13.150	13.500	Q
8	Clayton Bell	Jamaica	4.400	9.000	-0.100	13.300	13.300	Q
8	Clayton Bell	Jamaica	4.400	8.900		13.300	13.300	Q
9	Henry Lewis	Wales	5.200	7.800	-0.100	12.900	13.150	R1
9	Henry Lewis	Wales	4.800	8.600		13.400	13.150	R1
10	Yogeshwar Singh	India	4.800	8.300	-0.100	13.000	12.700	R2
10	Yogeshwar Singh	India	4.800	7.600		12.400	12.700	R2
11	Connor Sullivan	Scotland	4.800	7.700	-0.100	12.400	12.525	R3
11	Connor Sullivan	Scotland	4.800	7.850		12.650	12.525	R3
12	Tapeswaranath Das	India	4.400	7.650	-0.300	11.750	12.075	
12	Tapeswaranath Das	India	4.800	7.700	-0.100	12.400	12.075	
13	Daniel McLean	South Africa	4.400	7.900	-0.100	12.200	12.000	
13	Daniel McLean	South Africa	2.400	9.400		11.800	12.000	

=== Parallel bars ===
Rank	Gymnast	Country	Difficulty	Execution	Penalty	Bonus	Total	Notes
1	Alexander Yolshin-Cash	England	5.300	8.800			14.100	Q
2	Marios Georgiou	Cyprus	5.000	8.800			13.800	Q
3	Adam Tobin	England	5.200	8.500		0.100	13.800	Q
4	William Émard	Canada	5.000	8.650			13.650	Q
5	Elliot Vernon	Wales	5.100	8.550			13.650	Q
6	Félix Dolci	Canada	5.300	8.150		0.100	13.550	Q
7	Reuben Ward	Scotland	4.800	8.700			13.500	Q
8	Jesse Moore	Australia	5.100	8.400			13.500	Q
9	Georgios Angonas	Cyprus	4.700	8.500			13.200	R1
10	Alexander Niscoveanu	Wales	4.900	8.250			13.150	R2
11	René Cournoyer	Canada	5.400	7.750			13.150	–
12	Hamish Carter	Scotland	4.800	8.300			13.100	R3
13	Cameron Lynn	Scotland	5.000	8.350	-0.300		13.050	
14	Luke Whitehouse	England	5.300	7.900	-0.300		12.900	
15	James Hardy	Australia	4.000	8.850			12.850	
16	Chun Chen Ng	Malaysia	5.200	7.650			12.850	
17	Yogeshwar Singh	India	4.100	8.550		0.100	12.750	
18	Benjamin Foster	Australia	4.300	8.450			12.750	
19	Jovi Loh	Singapore	4.700	8.050			12.750	
20	Tapan Mohanty	India	4.100	8.600			12.700	
21	Joseph Cemlyn-Jones	Wales	5.000	7.600			12.600	
22	Gabriel Langton	England	5.400	7.200			12.600	
23	Pavel Karnejenko	Scotland	4.300	7.800			12.100	
24	Ritam Malik	Australia	4.300	7.650			11.950	
25	Kyriakos Markidis	Cyprus	3.700	8.150			11.850	
26	Clayton Bell	Jamaica	4.500	7.200			11.700	
27	Alexander Istock	New Zealand	4.300	7.300			11.600	
27	Jacob Edwards	Wales	4.300	7.300			11.600	
29	Justin Spencer	Cayman Islands	2.400	8.950		0.100	11.450	
30	Ethan Ikeda	Canada	4.100	7.200			11.300	
31	Daniel Stoddart	New Zealand	3.600	7.600			11.200	
32	Neofytos Kyriakou	Cyprus	3.100	8.050			11.150	
33	Chane Cumbermack	Trinidad and Tobago	4.000	7.300	-0.300		11.000	
34	Mikhail Koudinov	New Zealand	4.200	6.800			11.000	
35	Harry Eyres	Isle of Man	2.800	8.150			10.950	
36	Asher Pua	Singapore	2.500	8.150			10.650	
37	Abu Saeed Rafi	Bangladesh	1.900	8.100			10.000	
38	Tapeswaranath Das	India	4.100	5.900			10.000	
39	Rajib Chakma	Bangladesh	3.500	6.350	-0.300		9.550	
40	Shishir Ahmed	Bangladesh	1.900	7.400			9.300	
41	Shahzad Ali	Pakistan	2.100	6.200			8.300	
42	Daniel McLean	South Africa	3.200	4.650			7.850	
43	Barr Abdul	Singapore	2.600	5.950	-3.000		5.550	

=== Horizontal bar ===
Rank	Name	CGA	Difficulty	Execution	Penalty	Bonus	Total	Notes
1	Félix Dolci	Canada	5.800	8.450			14.250	Q
2	Marios Georgiou	Cyprus	5.200	8.550			13.750	Q
3	William Émard	Canada	4.600	8.800		0.100	13.500	Q
4	Cameron Lynn	Scotland	5.300	8.100		0.100	13.500	Q
5	Ritam Malik	Australia	4.700	8.650		0.100	13.450	Q
6	Alexander Yolshin-Cash	England	4.800	8.450			13.250	Q
7	Alexander Istock	New Zealand	4.400	8.800			13.200	Q
8	Alexander Niscoveanu	Wales	4.600	8.500		0.100	13.200	Q
9	Reuben Ward	Scotland	5.200	7.950			13.150	R1
10	Adam Tobin	England	5.200	7.900			13.100	R2
11	Hamish Carter	Scotland	4.300	8.500		0.100	12.900	–
12	Elliot Vernon	Wales	4.700	8.000			12.700	R3
13	Yogeshwar Singh	India	4.400	8.250			12.650	
14	Jesse Moore	Australia	5.400	7.250			12.650	
15	Daniel Stoddart	New Zealand	4.200	8.300			12.500	
16	Connor Sullivan	Scotland	4.400	8.000			12.400	
17	James Hardy	Australia	4.100	8.250			12.350	
18	Neofytos Kyriakou	Cyprus	4.700	7.550			12.250	
19	Chane Cumbermack	Trinidad and Tobago	4.000	8.050			12.050	
20	Jacob Edwards	Wales	3.600	8.300			11.900	
21	Georgios Angonas	Cyprus	4.700	7.200			11.900	
22	Tapan Mohanty	India	3.000	8.700			11.700	
23	Luke Whitehouse	England	4.200	7.500			11.700	
24	René Cournoyer	Canada	4.900	6.650			11.550	
25	Joseph Cemlyn-Jones	Wales	4.000	7.500			11.500	
26	Tapeswaranath Das	India	3.200	8.250			11.450	
27	Jovi Loh	Singapore	4.800	6.550			11.350	
28	Barr Abdul	Singapore	3.800	7.450			11.250	
29	Benjamin Foster	Australia	3.600	7.500			11.100	
29	Clayton Bell	Jamaica	3.600	7.500			11.100	
31	Ethan Ikeda	Canada	4.800	6.150			10.950	
32	Asher Pua	Singapore	4.100	6.550			10.650	
33	Justin Spencer	Cayman Islands	2.100	8.550	-0.300		10.350	
34	Kyriakos Markidis	Cyprus	3.400	6.950			10.350	
35	Harry Eyres	Isle of Man	2.400	7.700			10.100	
36	Daniel McLean	South Africa	3.100	6.850			9.950	
37	Abu Saeed Rafi	Bangladesh	1.700	7.750			9.450	
38	Mikhail Koudinov	New Zealand	2.500	7.000	-0.300		9.200	
39	Rajib Chakma	Bangladesh	3.200	5.700	-0.300		8.600	
40	Shishir Ahmed	Bangladesh	1.600	5.900			7.500	
41	Gabriel Langton	England	0.700	8.650	-6.000		3.350	
