= James Hardy (gymnast) =

Australian gymnast (born 2003)

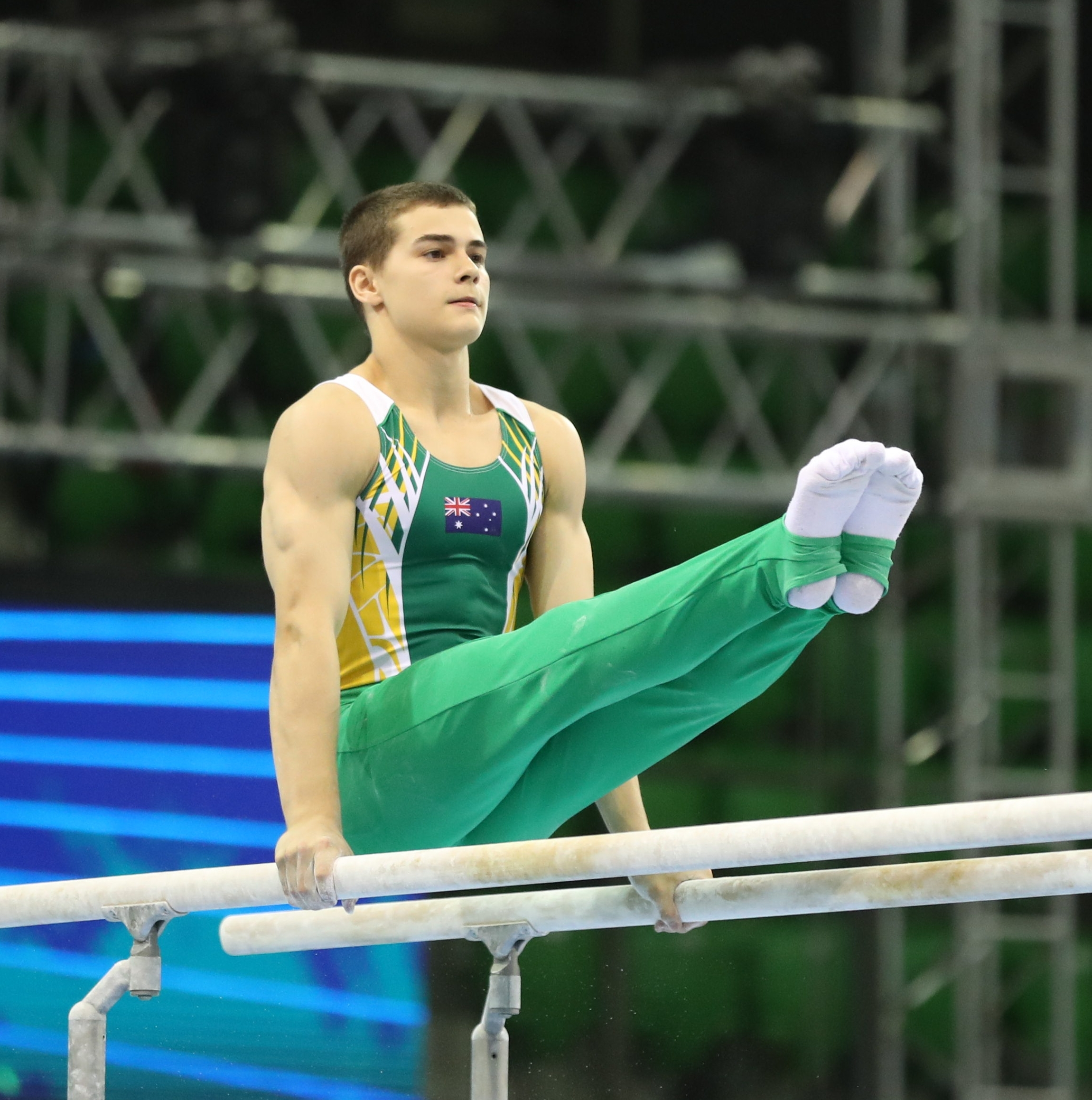
- Hardy at the 2019 Junior World Artistic Gymnastics Championships

Personal information
- Born: 14 March 2003 (age 23) Auchenflower, Queensland, Australia

Gymnastics career
- Discipline: Men's artistic gymnastics
- Country represented: Australia
Medal record
Men's artistic gymnastics
Representing Australia
Commonwealth Games
Bronze medal – third place	2026 Glasgow	Team
Bronze medal – third place	2026 Glasgow	Floor exercise
Bronze medal – third place	2026 Glasgow	Rings

James Hardy (born 14 March 2003) is an Australian artistic gymnast. He is a three-time bronze medalist at the 2026 Commonwealth Games.

== Gymnastics career ==
In May 2026, Hardy competed at the 2026 Oceania Championships and won a silver medal in the all-around with a score of 75.331, finishing behind Jesse Moore.

On 11 June 2026 he was selected to represent Australia at the 2026 Commonwealth Games. During the team competition he helped Australia win a bronze medal, their first Commonwealth Games team medal since 2010. Individually he qualified for rings, vault, and floor exercise event finals. During the event finals he won a bronze medal on floor with a score of 13.433. He also won a bronze medal on rings with a score of 13.500.

== Competitive history ==
Competitive history of James Hardy
Year	Event	Team	AA	FX	PH	SR	VT	PB	HB
2026	DTB Pokal Mixed Cup	3rd place, bronze medalist(s)							
2026	Commonwealth Games	3rd place, bronze medalist(s)		3rd place, bronze medalist(s)		3rd place, bronze medalist(s)			
2026	World Championships								
