= Jadumani Singh Mandengbam =

Indian boxer

Jadumani Singh
Personal information
- Full name: Jadumani Singh Mandengbam
- Nationality: Indian
- Born: 5 May 2004 (age 22) Iroishemba, Manipur, India

Sport
- Sport: Boxing
- Weight class: 55 kg
Medal record
Men's boxing
Representing India
World Boxing Cup
Silver medal – second place	2025 Delhi	50 kg
Bronze medal – third place	2025 Foz do Iguaçu	50 kg
Commonwealth Games
Silver medal – second place	2026 Glasgow	55 kg

Jadumani Singh Mandengbam (born 5 May 2004) is an Indian boxer who competes in the 55 kg weight category. He won the silver medal in the men's 55 kg weight category in the 2026 Commonwealth Games. He has also won a silver and a bronze medal in the 2025 World Boxing Cup.

== Early life ==
Jadumani Singh was born on 5 May 2004 in Iroishemba near Imphal in Manipur.

== Career ==
Jadumani Singh initially competed in the 50 kg weight category. He reached the semi-finals of in the Stage I of the World Boxing Cup in Foz do Iguaçu and won a bronze medal. In the finals of the World Boxing Cup held in Delhi between 16 and 20 November 2025, he won the silver medal in the 50 kg weight category. He later moved to the 55 kg weight category. He won a bronze medal at the Boxam Elite International in February 2026, and a gold medal at Grand Prix Usti Nad Labem held in Czechia later the same year.

Jadumani Singh was named in the Indian team for the 2026 Commonwealth Games after he won the national selection trials. At the Commonwealth Games in Glasgow, he competed in the men's 55 kg category, and began his campaign with a win over Aaron Cullen of Scotland in the round of 32. In the round of 16, he defeated Pakistan's Sumama Rehman, and dedicated the victory to the heroes of the Kargil War. In the quarter-finals, he defeated Zambia's Mwengo Mwale to advance to the semi-finals. In the semi-finals, he defeated Philip Haoseb of Namibia to progress to the finals. In the finals, he lost to Jye Dixon of Australia to settle for the silver medal.
