= Jordan Carroll =

Canadian gymnast (born 2006)

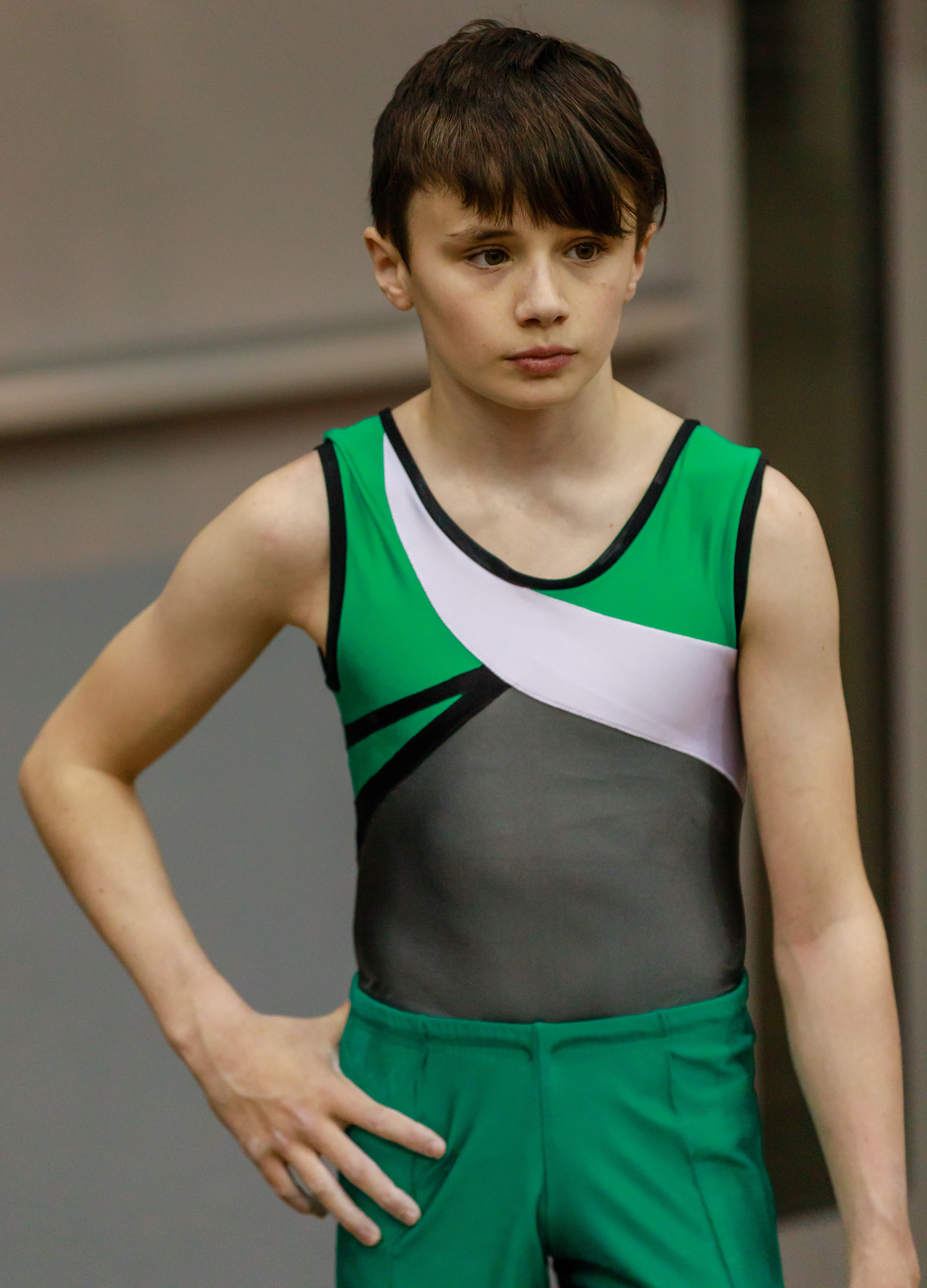
- Carroll in 2018.

Personal information
- Born: January 25, 2006 (age 20) St. John's, Newfoundland and Labrador, Canada
- Relatives: Mary DePiero (mother)

Gymnastics career
- Discipline: Men's artistic gymnastics
- Country represented: Canada; (2026–present)
- Training location: Saskatoon, Saskatchewan
- Gym: Taiso Gymnastics
Medal record
Men's artistic gymnastics
Representing Canada
Commonwealth Games
Gold medal – first place	2026 Glasgow	Team
Gold medal – first place	2026 Glasgow	Pommel horse
Pan American Championships
Gold medal – first place	2026 Rio de Janeiro	Team
Silver medal – second place	2026 Rio de Janeiro	Pommel horse

Jordan Carroll (born 25 January 2006) is a Canadian artistic gymnast who is a pommel horse specialist. He is a member of the Canada men's national artistic gymnastics team. He was a member of the gold medal-winning teams at the 2026 Pan American Championships and 2026 Commonwealth Games, where he also won silver and gold on pommel horse, respectively.

== Early life ==
Carroll was born to Steve Carroll and Mary DePiero. His mother is a national diving coach and was a gold medalist at the 1990 Commonwealth Games. His sister, Sydney, is a member of the Canadian national artistic swim team.

== Gymnastics career ==
=== 2023–2025 ===
Carroll competed at the 2023 Canada Winter Games and won a gold medal on pommel horse with a score of 12.500 points. This was Team Saskatchewan's first gold medal of the games, and Saskatchewan's first-ever gold medal on pommel horse.

In May 2024, he competed at the 2024 Junior Pan American Championships, where he won gold on pommel horse.

=== 2026–present ===
Carroll competed at the 2026 DTB Pokal Team Challenge and won gold on pommel horse. In June 2026, he competed at the 2026 Pan American Championships. He helped Canada win their first-ever men's team gold medal, along with René Cournoyer, Félix Dolci, William Émard, and Xavier Olasz. Individually he won silver on pommel horse behind Patrick Hoopes.

On July 3, 2026, Carroll was selected to represent Canada at the 2026 Commonwealth Games. During the team competition, he helped Canada win their first gold medal in the event since 2006. During the qualification round, he scored 14.550 on pommel horse to finish ahead of the reigning Olympic champion Rhys McClenaghan and advanced to the apparatus final in second place behind Reuben Ward. During the pommel horse, he won a gold medal on event final, he won gold with a score of 15.000.

Carroll was selected to represent Canada at the 2026 World Championships alongside Cournoyer, Dolci, Olasz, and Samuel Zakutney.

== Competitive history ==
Competitive history of Jordan Carroll
Year	Event	Team	AA	FX	PH	SR	VT	PB	HB
2024	Elite Canada				1st place, gold medalist(s)				
2024	Junior Pan American Championships	4			1st place, gold medalist(s)				
2025	Elite Canada				1st place, gold medalist(s)				
2025	Canadian Championships				1st place, gold medalist(s)				
2026	Elite Canada				1st place, gold medalist(s)				
2026	Cottbus World Cup				17				
2026	DTB Pokal Team Challenge				1st place, gold medalist(s)				
2026	Canadian Championships				1st place, gold medalist(s)				
2026	Pan American Championships	1st place, gold medalist(s)			2nd place, silver medalist(s)				
2026	Commonwealth Games	1st place, gold medalist(s)			1st place, gold medalist(s)				
2026	World Championships	13							
