= Pan American Artistic Gymnastics Championships – Men's rings =

The Pan American Gymnastics Championships were first held in 1997.

Three medals are awarded: gold for first place, silver for second place, and bronze for third place.

== Medalists ==
Year	Location	Gold	Silver	Bronze	Ref
1997	(Colombia) Medellín	(Puerto Rico) Diego Lizardi	(Cuba) Erick López (Argentina) Sergio Alvariño	—N/a	
2001	(Mexico) Cancún	(Cuba) Erick López	(Cuba) Charles Tamayo	(Venezuela) Regulo Carmona	
2004	(Venezuela) Maracaibo	(Venezuela) Regulo Carmona	(United States) Jonathan Horton (United States) David Sender (Venezuela) David Pacheco	—N/a	
2005	(Brazil) Rio de Janeiro	(Venezuela) Regulo Carmona	(Cuba) Abel Driggs Santos	(Puerto Rico) Luis Rivera	
2008	(Argentina) Rosario	(Venezuela) Regulo Carmona	(Argentina) Federico Molinari	(Brazil) Arthur Zanetti	
2010	(Mexico) Guadalajara	(Venezuela) Regulo Carmona	(Puerto Rico) Tommy Ramos	(Argentina) Federico Molinari	
2012	(Colombia) Medellín	(Argentina) Federico Molinari	(Puerto Rico) Luis Rivera	(Argentina) Osvaldo Martínez	
2013	(Puerto Rico) San Juan	(Brazil) Henrique Flores	(Argentina) Federico Molinari (Puerto Rico) Tommy Ramos	—N/a	
2014	(Canada) Mississauga	(Brazil) Arthur Zanetti	(United States) Brandon Wynn	(Chile) Juan Raffo	
2016	(Bolivia) Sucre	(Argentina) Federico Molinari	(Colombia) Didier Lugo	(Argentina) Daniel Villafañe	
2017	(Peru) Lima	(Argentina) Federico Molinari	(Brazil) Caio Souza	(Colombia) Kristopher Bohórquez	
2018	(Peru) Lima	(Mexico) Fabián de Luna	(Argentina) Federico Molinari	(Argentina) Daniel Villafañe	
2021	(Brazil) Rio de Janeiro	(Brazil) Caio Souza	(Argentina) Federico Molinari	(Colombia) Kristopher Bohórquez	
2022	(Brazil) Rio de Janeiro	(Brazil) Arthur Zanetti	(Brazil) Caio Souza	(United States) Riley Loos	
2023	(Colombia) Medellín	(Argentina) Daniel Villafañe	(Canada) William Émard	(Cuba) Alejandro de la Cruz	
2024	(Colombia) Santa Marta	(Chile) Joaquín Álvarez	(Argentina) Daniel Villafañe	(Brazil) Caio Souza	
2025	Panama City	(Argentina) Daniel Villafañe	(Puerto Rico) Francisco Vélez	(Puerto Rico) Jose Lopez	
2026	(Brazil) Rio de Janeiro	(Canada) William Émard	(Chile) Joaquín Álvarez	(Canada) Félix Dolci	

== Medal table ==
Rank	Nation	Gold	Silver	Bronze	Total
1	Argentina (ARG)	5	6	4	15
2	Brazil (BRA)	4	2	2	8
3	Venezuela (VEN)	4	1	1	6
4	Puerto Rico (PUR)	1	4	2	7
5	Cuba (CUB)	1	3	1	5
6	Canada (CAN)	1	1	1	3
6	Chile (CHI)	1	1	1	3
8	Mexico (MEX)	1	0	0	1
9	United States (USA)	0	3	1	4
10	Colombia (COL)	0	1	2	3
Totals (10 entries)		18	22	15	55
