= Boxing at the 2026 Commonwealth Games – Men's 55 kg =

Boxing competitions

Boxing – Men's 55 kg at the 2026 Commonwealth Games
- Venue: SEC Centre
- Dates: July 24 – 1 August 2026
- Competitors: 24 from 24 nations

Medalists
gold medal	Jye Dixon	Australia
silver medal	Jadumani Singh	India
bronze medal	Amadu Mohammed	Ghana
bronze medal	Philip Haoseb	Namibia

The men's 55 kg boxing competitions at the 2026 Commonwealth Games in Glasgow, Scotland took place between July 24 and August 1 at the SEC Centre.

Like all Commonwealth boxing events, the competition was a straight single-elimination tournament. Both semifinal losers were awarded bronze medals, so no boxers competed again after their first loss. Bouts consisted of three rounds of three minutes each, with one-minute breaks between rounds.

== Schedule ==
The schedule was as follows:

Date	Round
Friday 24 July	Preliminaries
Sunday 26 July	Preliminaries
Tuesday 28 July	Quarter-finals
Friday 31 July	Semi-finals
Saturday 1 August	Final

== Results ==
The draw was as follows:

=== Bracket ===
Round of 32
Thomas Teers (GGY)	1
Eriu Temakau (KIR)	3
Ellis Trowbridge (ENG)	RSC
Ricksen Nomleas (VAN)
Mathealira Seholoholo (LES)	KO
Louis Rooney (NIR)
Rakib Hossain (BAN)	RSC
Clinton Tetekana (SOL)
Aaron Cullen (SCO)	0
Jadumani Singh (IND)	5
Mwengo Mwale (ZAM)	RSC
Faki Issa Faki (TAN)
Marvelous-Marvin Canon (NRU)	0
Fabrice Valerie (MRI)	5
Philip Haoseb (NAM)	5
Siboniso Vilakati (SWZ)	0

Round of 16
Amadu Mohammed (GHA)	RSC
Eriu Temakau (KIR)
Ellis Trowbridge (ENG)	4
Rukmal Prasanna (SRI)	0
Jye Dixon (AUS)	5
Mathealira Seholoholo (LES)	0
Rakib Hossain (BAN)	5
Bid Michael Inoino (PNG)	0
Sumama Rehman (PAK)	0
Jadumani Singh (IND)	5
Mwengo Mwale (ZAM)	4
Masibulele Sigwela (RSA)	0
Alex Mukuka (NZL)	4
Fabrice Valerie (MRI)	1
Philip Haoseb (NAM)	RSC
Charif Yaya (TOG)

Quarterfinals
Amadu Mohammed (GHA)	4
Ellis Trowbridge (ENG)	1
Jye Dixon (AUS)
Rakib Hossain (BAN)	RSC
Jadumani Singh (IND)	5
Mwengo Mwale (ZAM)	0
Alex Mukuka (NZL)	0
Philip Haoseb (NAM)	4

Semifinals
Amadu Mohammed (GHA)	1
Jye Dixon (AUS)	4
Jadumani Singh (IND)	5
Philip Haoseb (NAM)	0

Final
Jye Dixon (AUS)	5
Jadumani Singh (IND)	0
