= Philip Haoseb =

Namibian boxer

Personal information
- Full name: Philip Pumulo Mutakela Haoseb
- Nationality: Namibia
- Born: 14 July 2005 (age 21)
- Height: 161 cm (5 ft 3 in)

Boxing career
- Weight class: 55 kg
Medal record
Men's amateur boxing
Representing Namibia
Commonwealth Games
Bronze medal – third place	2026 Glasgow	55 kg

Philip Pumulo Mutakela Haoseb (born 14 July 2005) is a Namibian boxer. He competed at the 2026 Commonwealth Games, winning the bronze medal in the men's 55 kg event.
