= Alexander Yolshin-Cash =

British artistic gymnast (born 2005)

- Full name: Alexander Yolshin-Cash
- Born: 9 August 2005 (age 21) Derby, England

Gymnastics career
- Discipline: Men's artistic gymnastics
- Country represented: (United Kingdom) Great Britain; England; (2024–present)
- Club: Notts Gymnastics Academy
- Head coach: Sergei Sizhanov
Medal record
Representing England
Commonwealth Games
Silver medal – second place	2026 Glasgow	Team

Alexander Yolshin-Cash (born 2005) is a British artistic gymnast who competes internationally for Great Britain and England. He represented England at the 2026 Commonwealth Games where the team won silver and Great Britain at the 2025 World Championships.

== Early life and education ==
Yolshin-Cash first started competing gymnastics aged five.

== Gymnastics career ==
=== Junior: 2023 ===
Yolshin-Cash represented Great Britain at the 2023 Junior World Championships. The team finished seventh, and individually he placed tenth in the all-around and fourth on pommel horse.

=== Senior: 2024–present ===
Yolshin-Cash was selected to compete at the 2024 Cairo World Cup, marking his debut senior competition. He competed on pommel horse and parallel bars but did not qualify for any finals. He later competed at the 2024 Koper World Challenge Cup, competing on pommel horse, parallel bars, and horizontal bar but again did not qualify for the finals. Yolshin-Cash missed both the English and British Championships that year with a shoulder injury.

In 2025, he competed in the Paris World Challenge Cup on pommel horse and parallel bars. He made the pommel horse final, finishing fifth overall. In late September, he was selected to represent Great Britain at the 2025 World Championships. He qualified for the pommel horse final where he placed fifth.

Yolshin-Cash was selected to represent England at the 2026 Commonwealth Games alongside Luke Whitehouse, Max Whitlock (later replaced by Gabriel Langton), Adam Tobin, and Joshua Nathan. The team won silver and individually Yolshin-Cash qualified to the parallel bars and horizontal bar finals. He placed eighth and fourth respectively.

== Competitive history ==
Competitive history of Alexander Yolshin-Cash
Year	Event	Team	AA	FX	PH	SR	VT	PB	HB
2023
2023	Junior World Championships	7	10		4				
2024	Cairo World Cup							14	
2024	Koper Challenge Cup							9	
2025	Paris Challenge Cup				5				
2025	World Championships				5				
2026	British Championships				6				3rd place, bronze medalist(s)
2026	Commonwealth Games	2nd place, silver medalist(s)						8	4
