= Jye Dixon =

Australian boxer

Personal information
- Nationality: Australia
- Born: 20 March 2005 (age 21)
- Height: 165 cm (5 ft 5 in)

Boxing career
- Weight class: 55 kg
Medal record
Men's amateur boxing
Representing Australia
Commonwealth Games
Gold medal – first place	2026 Glasgow	55 kg

Jye Dixon (born 20 March 2005), nicknamed "The Tank", is an Australian boxer. He competed at the 2026 Commonwealth Games, winning the gold medal in the men's 55 kg event.
