= William Émard =

Canadian artistic gymnast (born 2000)

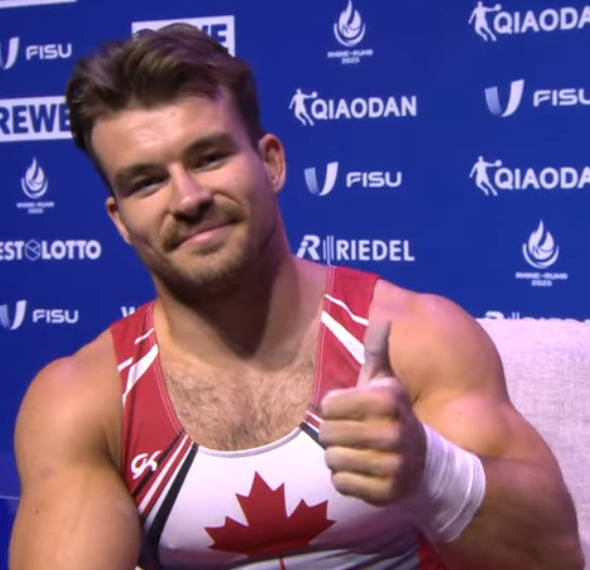
- Émard at the 2025 World University Games

Personal information
- Born: 17 March 2000 (age 26) Laval, Quebec, Canada
- Height: 160 cm (5 ft 3 in)

Gymnastics career
- Discipline: Men's artistic gymnastics
- Country represented: Canada; (2016–present)
- Club: Laval Excellence
- Head coach: Adrian Balan
Medal record
Men's artistic gymnastics
Representing Canada
Commonwealth Games
Gold medal – first place	2026 Glasgow	Team
Silver medal – second place	2026 Glasgow	Rings
Bronze medal – third place	2026 Glasgow	Horizontal bar
Pan American Games
Silver medal – second place	2023 Santiago	Team
Pan American Championships
Gold medal – first place	2026 Rio de Janeiro	Team
Gold medal – first place	2026 Rio de Janeiro	Rings
Silver medal – second place	2023 Medellín	Team
Silver medal – second place	2023 Medellín	Rings
World University Games
Silver medal – second place	2025 Rhine-Ruhr	Team
Bronze medal – third place	2025 Rhine-Ruhr	All-around
Bronze medal – third place	2025 Rhine-Ruhr	Rings
Pacific Rim Championships
Silver medal – second place	2018 Medellín	Team
FIG World Cup
Event	1st	2nd	3rd
World Challenge Cup	1	2	1
Total	1	2	1

William Émard (born 17 March 2000) is a Canadian artistic gymnast. He represented Canada at the 2024 Olympic Games. He is the 2026 Pan American champion on rings. He was part of the gold medal-winning team at the 2026 Pan American Championships and the silver medal-winning team at the 2025 World University Games.

== Gymnastics career ==
=== 2018–2021 ===
Émard joined the senior Canadian national team in 2018. However, his early career was plagued by injuries. At the 2018 Pacific Rim Championships, he injured himself during warm-up and then spent several months in recovery for a knee injury and a labrum tear in the shoulder.

Émard competed at the 2019 Paris Challenge Cup where he qualified to the event finals on floor exercise, rings, and vault. The following month he competed at the 2019 World Championships where he helped Canada finish seventeenth as a team during qualifications. Throughout 2019 and 2020, Émard had been suffering from a knee injury that kept him limited in his training.

Émard's first International success came at the 2021 Koper World Challenge Cup where he won silver on floor exercise, and then at the Mersin World Challenge Cup he won bronze on floor exercise, silver on rings, and gold on vault. Émard competed at the 2021 World Championships, qualifying in eleventh to the all-around final, sixth on rings, and eighth on vault. He placed eighth in the all-around final and on vault and seventh on rings. In finishing eighth in the all-around final, he earned the best all-around result for a Canadian male gymnast in World Championship history.

=== 2022–2024 ===
Émard competed at the 2022 World Championships where he helped the Canadian team finish tenth during qualifications. Émard competed at the 2023 Pan American Championships. On the first day of competition, he helped the Canadian team qualify to the team final. Additionally, he won silver on rings, which was the first Pan American Championships medal won by a Canadian on the apparatus. During the team final Émard helped Canada win the silver medal behind the United States.

In October, Émard competed at the 2023 World Championships. During qualifications he helped Canada finish fourth, which qualified Canada a team berth to the 2024 Olympic Games, a feat last achieved by the Canadian men's gymnastics team in 2008. During the team final Émard contributed scores on all apparatuses except pommel horse towards Canada's seventh place finish.

In late June of 2024, Émard was named to the team to represent Canada at the 2024 Summer Olympics alongside Zachary Clay, René Cournoyer, Félix Dolci, and Samuel Zakutney. While there he helped Canada finish eighth as a team.

=== 2025–present ===
Émard competed at the 2025 World University Games alongside Matteo Bardana, Ioannis Chronopoulos, Félix Dolci, and Jayson Rampersad. Together they finished second behind Japan, earning Canada its first ever men's team medal at the FISU World University Games. Individually Émard won bronze in the all-around and on rings.

At the 2026 Pan American Championships, Émard helped Canada win their first-ever Pan American team gold medal. During event finals he won gold on rings, becoming the first Canadian to win a title on rings at the Pan American Championships.

Émard competed at the 2026 Commonwealth Games alongside Jordan Carroll, René Cournoyer, Félix Dolci, and Ethan Ikeda. Together they won gold as a team, Canada's first Commonwealth men's team gold in twenty years. Individually, Émard qualified to the all-around, rings, parallel bars, and horizontal bar finals. Émard finished eighth in the all-around final. On the first day of apparatus finals, he won silver on rings behind Dolci. On the final day of the competition, he placed fourth on parallel bars. During the horizontal bar final, his grip broke, leading to him falling off the apparatus. Rules state that when equipment malfunctions, an athlete can redo their routine after the other competitors have competed. Émard performed cleanly on his second attempt and won bronze behind Dolci and Marios Georgiou.

Émard was selected to represent Canada at the 2026 World Championships alongside Carroll, Cournoyer, Dolci, and Samuel Zakutney. He later withdrew due to injury.

== Competitive history ==
Competitive history of William Émard at the junior level
Year	Event	Team	AA	FX	PH	SR	VT	PB	HB
2016	Olympic Hopes Cup	1st place, gold medalist(s)	1st place, gold medalist(s)	7		1st place, gold medalist(s)	1st place, gold medalist(s)		
2017	Elite Canada					2nd place, silver medalist(s)	1st place, gold medalist(s)		4
2017	UCIC Calgary			2nd place, silver medalist(s)		1st place, gold medalist(s)			
2017	Canadian Championships		1st place, gold medalist(s)	1st place, gold medalist(s)	3rd place, bronze medalist(s)	1st place, gold medalist(s)	1st place, gold medalist(s)		1st place, gold medalist(s)
2017	Guimaraes Tournament					2nd place, silver medalist(s)	2nd place, silver medalist(s)		2nd place, silver medalist(s)
2017	Junior Japan Intl Tournament					1st place, gold medalist(s)			

Competitive history of William Émard at the senior level
Year	Event	Team	AA	FX	PH	SR	VT	PB	HB
2018	Elite Canada		6	6			1st place, gold medalist(s)		5
2018	UCIC Calgary		2nd place, silver medalist(s)	1st place, gold medalist(s)			1st place, gold medalist(s)		3rd place, bronze medalist(s)
2018	Pacific Rim Championships	2nd place, silver medalist(s)							
2019	Elite Canada			1st place, gold medalist(s)		2nd place, silver medalist(s)	1st place, gold medalist(s)		
2019	UCIC Calgary			5					
2019	Canadian Championships			1st place, gold medalist(s)					
2019	Paris Challenge Cup			7		7	8		
2019	World Championships	17							
2021	Koper Challenge Cup			2nd place, silver medalist(s)					
2021	Mersin Challenge Cup			3rd place, bronze medalist(s)		2nd place, silver medalist(s)	1st place, gold medalist(s)		
2021	World Championships		8			7	8		
2022	Paris Challenge Cup			5					
2022	World Championships	10							
2023
2023	Pan American Championships	2nd place, silver medalist(s)	7			2nd place, silver medalist(s)			
2023	RomGym Trophy	2nd place, silver medalist(s)	2nd place, silver medalist(s)	2nd place, silver medalist(s)		2nd place, silver medalist(s)			
2023	World Championships	7							
2023	Pan American Games	2nd place, silver medalist(s)	16					6	8
2024	Elite Canada			3rd place, bronze medalist(s)		1st place, gold medalist(s)	15		4
2024	Canadian Championships		3rd place, bronze medalist(s)	2nd place, silver medalist(s)	14	3rd place, bronze medalist(s)		7	5
2024	Olympic Games	8							
2025	World University Games	2nd place, silver medalist(s)	3rd place, bronze medalist(s)			3rd place, bronze medalist(s)		5	
2025	World Championships					29			
2026	Elite Canada		1st place, gold medalist(s)	1st place, gold medalist(s)	8	1st place, gold medalist(s)	2nd place, silver medalist(s)	1st place, gold medalist(s)	3rd place, bronze medalist(s)
2026	Canadian Championships		4	6	8	2nd place, silver medalist(s)			
2026	Pan American Championships	1st place, gold medalist(s)				1st place, gold medalist(s)			
2026	Commonwealth Games	1st place, gold medalist(s)	8			2nd place, silver medalist(s)		4	3rd place, bronze medalist(s)
