= 2019 in gymnastics =

The following were the events of gymnastics for the year 2019 throughout the world.

== Acrobatic gymnastics ==
- March 8 – 10: FIG World Cup 2019 (AcG #1) in Maia
  - Pair winners: Russia (Timofei Ivanov & Maksim Karavaev) (m) / Portugal (Rita Ferreira & Ana Teixeira) (f)
  - Mixed Pair winners: Russia (Victoria Aksenova & Kirill Startsev)
  - Men's Group winners: Portugal (Henrique Piqueiro, Frederico Silva, Henrique Silva, & Miguel Silva)
  - Women's Group winners: Russia (Daria Chebulanka, Anastasiia Parshina, & Kseniia Zagoskina)
- March 22 – 24: FIG World Cup 2019 (AcG #2) in (United States) Las Vegas
  - Pair winners: Kazakhstan (Daniyel Dil & Vadim Shulyar) (m) / Portugal (Rita Ferreira & Ana Teixeira) (f)
  - Mixed Pair winners: Russia (Victoria Aksenova & Kirill Startsev)
  - Men's Group winners: China (FU Zhi, GUO Pei, JIANG Heng, & ZHANG Junshuo)
  - Women's Group winners: Belarus (Julia Ivonchyk, Veranika Nabokina, & Karina Sandovich)
- April 12 – 14: FIG World Cup 2019 (AcG #3) in (Belgium) Puurs
  - Pair winners: Russia (Timofei Ivanov & Maksim Karavaev) (m) / Portugal (Rita Ferreira & Ana Teixeira) (f)
  - Mixed Pair winners: Russia (Victoria Aksenova & Kirill Startsev)
  - Men's Group winners: China (FU Zhi, GUO Pei, JIANG Heng, & ZHANG Junshuo)
  - Women's Group winners: Russia (Daria Chebulanka, Anastasiia Parshina, & Kseniia Zagoskina)
- September 13 – 15: FIG World Cup 2019 (AcG #4) in Lisbon
  - Pairs winners: Russia (Timofei Ivanov & Maksim Karavaev) (m) / Russia (Aliia Salakhova & Diana Tukhvatullina) (f)
  - Mixed Pair winners: Russia (Victoria Aksenova & Kirill Startsev)
  - Men's Group winners: Portugal (Henrique Piqueiro, Frederico Silva, Henrique Silva, & Miguel Silva)
  - Women's Group winners: Israel (Or Armony, Tzlil Hurvitz, & Yarin Ovadia)
- October 10 – 12: 2019 Asian Acrobatic Gymnastics Championships in (Uzbekistan) Tashkent

== Aerobic gymnastics ==
- March 29 – 31: FIG World Cup 2019 (AeG #1) in (Portugal) Cantanhede
  - Individual winners: (Hungary) Daniel Bali (m) / (Turkey) Ayse Onbasi (f)
  - Mixed Pair winners: Hungary (Daniel Bali & Fanni Mazacs)
  - Trio winners: Hungary (Daniel Bali, Balázs Farkas, & Fanni Mazacs)
  - Group winners: Bulgaria
- April 13 & 14: FIG World Cup 2019 (AeG #2) in (Japan) Tokyo
  - Individual winners: (Mexico) Ivan Veloz (m) / (Japan) Riri Kitazume (f)
  - Mixed Pair winners: Hungary (Daniel Bali & Fanni Mazacs)
  - Trio winners: Hungary (Daniel Bali, Balázs Farkas, & Fanni Mazacs)
  - Group winners: Vietnam
- May 24 – 26: 2019 Aerobic Gymnastics European Championships in (Azerbaijan) Baku
  - Individual winners: (Russia) Roman Semenov (m) / (Russia) Ekaterina Pykhtova (f)
  - Mixed Pair winners: Hungary (Daniel Bali & Fanni Mazacs)
  - Trio winners: Hungary (Daniel Bali, Balázs Farkas, & Fanni Mazacs)
  - Group winners: Romania

== Artistic gymnastics ==
- February 21 – 24: FIG World Cup 2019 (AG #1) in (Australia) Melbourne
  - Floor winners: (Philippines) Carlos Yulo (m) / (Italy) Vanessa Ferrari (f)
  - Vault winners: (Ukraine) Ihor Radivilov (m) / (South Korea) YEO Seo-jeong (f)
  - Men's Horizontal Bar winner: (Japan) Hidetaka Miyachi
  - Men's Parallel Bars winner: (China) You Hao
  - Men's Pommel Horse winner: (Chinese Taipei) Lee Chih-kai
  - Men's Still Rings winner: (China) Liu Yang
  - Women's Balance Beam winner: (China) ZHAO Shiting
  - Women's Uneven Bars winner: (China) Fan Yilin
- March 2: AT&T American Cup Individual All-Around (FIG World Cup 2019 (IAA #1)) in (United States) Greensboro
  - All-Around winners: (United States) Yul Moldauer (m) / (United States) Leanne Wong (f)
- March 14 – 17: FIG World Cup 2019 (AG #2) in (Azerbaijan) Baku
  - Floor winners: (Israel) Artem Dolgopyat (m) / (United States) Jade Carey (f)
  - Vault winners: (South Korea) Yang Hak-seon (m) / (United States) Jade Carey (f)
  - Men's Horizontal Bar winner: (Netherlands) Epke Zonderland
  - Men's Parallel Bars winner: (Russia) Vladislav Polyashov
  - Men's Pommel Horse winner: (Japan) Kohei Kameyama
  - Men's Still Rings winner: (United Kingdom) Courtney Tulloch
  - Women's Balance Beam winner: (Australia) Emma Nedov
  - Women's Uneven Bars winner: (China) LYU Jiaqi
- March 16 & 17: EnBW DTB-Pokal Individual All-Around (FIG World Cup 2019 (IAA #2)) in (Germany) Stuttgart
  - All-Around winners: (Russia) Artur Dalaloyan (m) / (United States) Simone Biles (f)
- March 20 – 23: FIG World Cup 2019 (AG #3) in (Qatar) Doha
  - Floor winners: (Israel) Alexander Shatilov (m) / (United States) Jade Carey (f)
  - Vault winners: (South Korea) Yang Hak-seon (m) / (United States) Jade Carey (f)
  - Men's Horizontal Bar winner: (Croatia) Tin Srbić
  - Men's Parallel Bars winner: (China) Zou Jingyuan
  - Men's Pommel Horse winner: (Chinese Taipei) Lee Chih-kai
  - Men's Still Rings winner: (China) LAN Xingyu
  - Women's Balance Beam winner: (China) LI Qi
  - Women's Uneven Bars winner: (Belgium) Nina Derwael
- March 23: FIG World Cup 2019 (IAA #3) in (United Kingdom) Birmingham
  - All-Around winners: (Russia) Nikita Nagornyy (m) / (Russia) Aliya Mustafina (f)
- April 7: FIG World Cup 2019 (IAA #4) in (Japan) Tokyo
  - All-Around winners: (United States) Sam Mikulak (m) / (United States) Morgan Hurd (f)
- April 10 – 14: 2019 European Artistic Gymnastics Championships (Individual) for Men and Women in (Poland) Szczecin
  - All-Around winners: (Russia) Nikita Nagornyy (m) / (France) Mélanie de Jesus dos Santos (f)
  - Floor winners: (Russia) Artur Dalaloyan (m) / (France) Mélanie de Jesus dos Santos (f)
  - Vault winners: (Russia) Denis Ablyazin (m) / (Russia) Maria Paseka (f)
  - Men's Horizontal Bar winner: (Netherlands) Epke Zonderland
  - Men's Parallel Bars winner: (Russia) Nikita Nagornyy
  - Men's Pommel Horse winner: (United Kingdom) Max Whitlock
  - Men's Still Rings winner: (Russia) Denis Ablyazin
  - Women's Balance Beam winner: (United Kingdom) Alice Kinsella
  - Women's Uneven Bars winner: (Russia) Anastasia Ilyankova
- May 19 – 21: FIG World Challenge Cup 2019 (AG #1) in (China) Zhaoqing
  - Floor winners: (China) Deng Shudi (m) / (China) LIU Jingxing (f)
  - Vault winners: (North Korea) KIM Hyok (m) / (China) YU Linmin (f)
  - Men's Horizontal Bar winner: (Japan) Takuya Sakakibara
  - Men's Parallel Bars winner: (China) Zou Jingyuan
  - Men's Pommel Horse winner: (China) Zou Jingyuan
  - Men's Still Rings winner: (China) Liu Yang
  - Women's Balance Beam winner: (China) LI Shijia
  - Women's Uneven Bars winner: (China) LI Shijia
- May 23 – 26: FIG World Challenge Cup 2019 (AG #2) in (Croatia) Osijek
  - Floor winners: (Israel) Artem Dolgopyat (m) / (Croatia) Ana Đerek (f)
  - Vault winners: (Hong Kong) Shek Wai Hung (m) / (Slovenia) Teja Belak (f)
  - Men's Horizontal Bar winner: (Russia) Alexey Rostov
  - Men's Parallel Bars winner: (Lithuania) Robert Tvorogal
  - Men's Pommel Horse winner: (Croatia) Robert Seligman
  - Men's Still Rings winner: (Azerbaijan) Nikita Simonov
  - Women's Balance Beam winner: (Ukraine) Angelina Kysla
  - Women's Uneven Bars winner: (Russia) Anastasiia Agafonova
- May 30 – June 2: FIG World Challenge Cup 2019 (AG #3) in (Slovenia) Koper
  - Floor winners: (Chile) Tomás González (m) / (Switzerland) Ilaria Käslin (f)
  - Vault winners: (Hong Kong) Shek Wai Hung (m) / (Azerbaijan) Marina Nekrasova (f)
  - Men's Horizontal Bar winner: (Turkey) Umit Samiloglu
  - Men's Parallel Bars winner: (United Kingdom) Frank Baines
  - Men's Pommel Horse winner: (Republic of Ireland) Rhys McClenaghan
  - Men's Still Rings winner: (Azerbaijan) Nikita Simonov
  - Women's Balance Beam winner: (Hungary) Zsófia Kovács
  - Women's Uneven Bars winner: (Hungary) Zsófia Kovács
- June 27 – 30: 2019 Junior World Artistic Gymnastics Championships in (Hungary) Győr (debut event)
  - Junior All-Around winners: (Japan) Shinnosuke Oka (m) / (Russia) Viktoriia Listunova (f)
  - Junior Floor winners: (South Korea) RYU Sung-hyun (m) / (Russia) Viktoriia Listunova (f)
  - Junior Vault winners: (Romania) Gabriel Burtanete (m) / (United States) Kayla di Cello (f)
  - Junior Team winners: Japan (m) / Russia (f)
  - Junior Men's Horizontal Bar winner: (Ukraine) Nazar Chepurnyi
  - Junior Men's Parallel Bars winner: (Japan) Takeru Kitazono
  - Junior Men's Pommel Horse winner: (Japan) Takeru Kitazono
  - Junior Men's Still Rings winner: (Canada) Félix Dolci
  - Junior Women's Balance Beam winner: (Russia) Elena Gerasimova
  - Junior Women's Uneven Bars winner: (Russia) Vladislava Urazova
- August 30 – September 1: FIG World Challenge Cup 2019 (AG #4) in (Turkey) Mersin
  - Floor winners: (Croatia) Aurel Benovic (m) / (Turkey) Göksu Üçtaş (f)
  - Vault winners: (Azerbaijan) Murad Agharzayev (m) / (Slovenia) Teja Belak (f)
  - Men's Horizontal Bar winner: (Turkey) Umit Samiloglu
  - Men's Parallel Bars winner: (Turkey) Ferhat Arıcan
  - Men's Pommel Horse winner: (Slovenia) Sašo Bertoncelj
  - Men's Still Rings winner: (Turkey) İbrahim Çolak
  - Women's Balance Beam winner: (Canada) Audrey Rousseau
  - Women's Uneven Bars winner: (Turkey) Nazli Savranbasi
- September 6 – 8: FIG World Challenge Cup 2019 (AG #5) in (Hungary) Szombathely
  - Floor winners: (Israel) Artem Dolgopyat (m) / (Spain) Marina Gonzalez (f)
  - Vault winners: (Japan) Hidenobu Yonekura (m) / (Azerbaijan) Marina Nekrasova (f)
  - Men's Horizontal Bar winner: (Hungary) David Vecsernyes
  - Men's Parallel Bars winner: (Ukraine) Oleg Verniaiev
  - Men's Pommel Horse winner: (United Kingdom) Joshua Nathan
  - Men's Still Rings winner: (Ukraine) Ihor Radivilov
  - Women's Balance Beam winner: (Hungary) Noémi Makra
  - Women's Uneven Bars winner: (South Africa) Caitlin Rooskrantz
- September 14 & 15: FIG World Challenge Cup 2019 (AG #6) in (France) Paris
  - Floor winners: (Japan) Kazuki Minami (m) / (Ukraine) Diana Varinska (f)
  - Vault winners: (France) Loris Frasca (m) / (Uzbekistan) Oksana Chusovitina (f)
  - Men's Horizontal Bar winner: (Croatia) Tin Srbić
  - Men's Parallel Bars winner: (Japan) Kaito Sugimoto
  - Men's Pommel Horse winner: (United Kingdom) Joshua Nathan
  - Men's Still Rings winner: (France) Samir Aït Saïd
  - Women's Balance Beam winner: (Russia) Anastasiia Agafonova
  - Women's Uneven Bars winner: (France) Mélanie de Jesus dos Santos
- September 19 – 22: FIG World Challenge Cup 2019 (AG #7) in (Portugal) Guimarães
  - Floor winners: (Japan) Takaaki Sugino (m) / (Mexico) Ana Lago (f)
  - Vault winners: (Poland) Sebastian Gawronski (m) / (Puerto Rico) Paula Mejías (f)
  - Men's Horizontal Bar winner: (Japan) Hirohito Kohama
  - Men's Parallel Bars winner: (Japan) Takuya Nagano
  - Men's Pommel Horse winner: (Japan) Takaaki Sugino
  - Men's Still Rings winner: (Japan) Takuya Nagano
  - Women's Balance Beam winner: (Portugal) Ana Filipa Martins
  - Women's Uneven Bars winner: (Mexico) Frida Esparza
- October 4 – 13: 2019 World Artistic Gymnastics Championships in (Germany) Stuttgart
  - Individual All-Around winners: (Russia) Nikita Nagornyy (m) / (United States) Simone Biles (f)
  - Floor winners: (Philippines) Carlos Yulo (m) / (United States) Simone Biles (f)
  - Vault winners: (Russia) Nikita Nagornyy (m) / (United States) Simone Biles (f)
  - Men's Horizontal Bar winner: (Brazil) Arthur Mariano
  - Men's Parallel Bars winner: (United Kingdom) Joe Fraser
  - Men's Pommel Horse winner: (United Kingdom) Max Whitlock
  - Men's Still Rings winner: (Turkey) İbrahim Çolak
  - Women's Balance Beam winner: (United States) Simone Biles
  - Women's Uneven Bars winner: (Belgium) Nina Derwael
  - Team winners: Russia (m) / United States (f)
- November 21 – 24: 2019 Turnier der Meister FIG Individual Apparatus World Cup in (Germany) Cottbus

== Rhythmic gymnastics ==
- April 5 – 7: FIG World Cup 2019 (RG #1) in Pesaro
  - All-Around winner: (Russia) Dina Averina
  - Ball winner: (Russia) Arina Averina
  - Clubs winner: (Russia) Dina Averina
  - Hoop winner: (Russia) Arina Averina
  - Ribbon winner: (Russia) Dina Averina
  - Group All-Around winners: Russia
  - Group Five Balls winners: Italy
  - Group Three Balls & Two Hoops winners: Bulgaria
- April 12 – 14: FIG World Cup 2019 (RG #2) in Sofia
  - All-Around winner: (Russia) Aleksandra Soldatova
  - Ball winner: (Russia) Ekaterina Selezneva
  - Clubs winner: (Israel) Linoy Ashram
  - Hoop winner: (Israel) Linoy Ashram
  - Ribbon winner: (Russia) Aleksandra Soldatova
  - Group All-Around winners: Bulgaria
  - Group Five Balls winners: Belarus
  - Group Three Balls & Two Hoops winners: Ukraine
- April 19 – 21: FIG World Cup 2019 (RG #3) in (Uzbekistan) Tashkent
  - All-Around winner: (Russia) Aleksandra Soldatova
  - Ball winner: (Russia) Aleksandra Soldatova
  - Clubs winner: (Russia) Aleksandra Soldatova
  - Hoop winner: (Russia) Aleksandra Soldatova
  - Ribbon winner: (Russia) Anastasia Guzenkova
  - Group All-Around winners: Russia
  - Group Five Balls winners: Russia
  - Group Three Balls & Two Hoops winners: Russia
- April 26 – 28: FIG World Cup 2019 (RG #4) in (Azerbaijan) Baku
  - All-Around winner: (Russia) Dina Averina
  - Ball winner: (Israel) Linoy Ashram
  - Clubs winner: (Russia) Dina Averina
  - Hoop winner: (Russia) Dina Averina
  - Ribbon winner: (Belarus) Anastasiia Salos
  - Group All-Around winners: Japan
  - Group Five Balls winners: Russia
  - Group Three Hoops & Two Clubs winners: Bulgaria
- May 3 – 5: FIG World Challenge Cup 2019 (RG #1) in (Spain) Guadalajara
  - All-Around winner: (Russia) Aleksandra Soldatova
  - Ball winner: (Russia) Aleksandra Soldatova
  - Clubs winner: (Russia) Aleksandra Soldatova
  - Hoop winner: (Russia) Aleksandra Soldatova
  - Ribbon winner: (Russia) Aleksandra Soldatova
  - Group All-Around winners: Italy
  - Group Five Balls winners: Russia
  - Group Three Hoops & Four Clubs winners: Bulgaria
- May 16 – 19: 2019 Rhythmic Gymnastics European Championships in (Azerbaijan) Baku
  - Ball winner: (Russia) Arina Averina
  - Clubs winner: (Russia) Arina Averina
  - Hoop winner: (Russia) Dina Averina
  - Ribbon winner: (Russia) Dina Averina
- July 19 – 21: 2019 FIG Rhythmic Gymnastics Junior World Championships in Moscow (debut event)
  - Junior All-Around winner:
  - Junior Ball winner: (Russia) Lala Kramarenko
  - Junior Clubs winner: (Russia) Lala Kramarenko
  - Junior Ribbon winner: (Russia) Dariia Sergaeva
  - Junior Rope winner: (Russia) Anastasia Simakova
  - Junior Group All-Around winners: Russia
  - Junior Group 5-Hoops winners: Russia
  - Junior Group 5-Ribbon winners: Russia
  - Junior All-Around Team Apparatus winners: Russia
- August 16 – 18: FIG BSB Bank World Challenge Cup 2019 (RG #2) in (Belarus) Minsk
  - All-Around winner: (Russia) Dina Averina
  - Ball winner: (Russia) Dina Averina
  - Clubs winner: (Russia) Dina Averina
  - Hoop winner: (Israel) Linoy Ashram
  - Ribbon winner: (Russia) Dina Averina
  - Group All-Around winners: Russia
  - Group Five Balls winners: Italy
  - Group Three Hoops & Two Clubs winners: Bulgaria
- August 23 – 25: FIG World Challenge Cup 2019 (RG #3) in (Romania) Cluj-Napoca
  - All-Around winner: (Israel) Linoy Ashram
  - Ball winner: (Russia) Ekaterina Selezneva
  - Clubs winner: (Ukraine) Vlada Nikolchenko
  - Hoop winner: (Israel) Linoy Ashram
  - Ribbon winner: (Israel) Linoy Ashram
  - Group All-Around winners: Israel
  - Group Five Balls winners: Ukraine
  - Group Three Hoops & Two Clubs winners: Ukraine
- August 30 – September 1: FIG World Challenge Cup 2019 (RG #4) in Kazan
  - All-Around winner: (Russia) Dina Averina
  - Ball winner: (Russia) Dina Averina
  - Clubs winner: (Russia) Dina Averina
  - Hoop winner: (Russia) Arina Averina
  - Ribbon winner: (Russia) Dina Averina
  - Group All-Around winners: Russia
  - Group Five Balls winners: Russia
  - Group Three Hoops & Two Clubs winners: Bulgaria
- September 6 – 8: FIG World Challenge Cup 2019 (RG #5) in (Portugal) Portimão
  - All-Around winner: (Russia) Aleksandra Soldatova
  - Ball winner: (Italy) Milena Baldassarri
  - Clubs winner: (Italy) Alexandra Agiurgiuculese
  - Hoop winner: (Italy) Alexandra Agiurgiuculese
  - Ribbon winner: (Italy) Milena Baldassarri
  - Group All-Around winners: Italy
  - Group Five Balls winners: Italy
  - Group Three Hoops & Two Clubs winners: Belarus
- September 16 – 22: 2019 World Rhythmic Gymnastics Championships in (Azerbaijan) Baku
  - All-Around winner: (Russia) Dina Averina
  - Ball winner: (Russia) Dina Averina
  - Clubs winner: (Russia) Dina Averina
  - Hoop winner: (Russia) Ekaterina Selezneva
  - Ribbon winner: (Russia) Dina Averina
  - Group All-Around winners: Russia
  - Group Five Balls winners: Japan
  - Group Three Hoops & Two Clubs winners: Russia
  - Team winners: Russia (Arina Averina, Dina Averina, & Ekaterina Selezneva)

== Trampolining & Tumbling ==
- February 16 & 17: FIG TRA World Cup 2019 #1 in (Azerbaijan) Baku
  - Trampoline Individual winners: (Belarus) Uladzislau Hancharou (m) / (China) LIU Lingling (f)
  - Trampoline Synchronized winners: Japan (Daiki Kishi & Ryosuke Sakai) (m) / Belarus (Valiantsina Bahamolava & Anhelina Khatsian) (f)
  - Tumbling Individual winners: (Russia) Vadim Afanasev (m) / (Ukraine) Daryna Koziarska (f)
- April 20 & 21: FIG TRA World Cup 2019 #2 in Minsk
  - Trampoline Individual winners: (Russia) Mikhail Melnik (m) / (China) ZHU Xueying (f)
  - Trampoline Synchronized winners: Belarus (Uladzislau Hancharou & Aleh Rabtsau) (m) / Belarus (Maryia Makharynskaya & Hanna Hancharova) (f)
- September 21 & 22: FIG TRA World Cup 2019 #3 in (Russia) Khabarovsk
  - Trampoline Individual winners: (China) Gao Lei (m) / (Russia) Yana Pavlova (f)
  - Trampoline Synchronized winners: United States (Jeffrey Gluckstein & Aliaksei Shostak) (m) / Japan (Ayano Kishi & Yumi Takagi) (f)
  - Tumbling Individual winners: (Azerbaijan) Mikhail Malkin (m) / (China) JIA Fangfang (f)
  - Double Mini winners: (Russia) Mikhail Zalomin (m) / (Sweden) Lina Sjoeberg (f)
- October 5 & 6: FIG TRA World Cup 2019 #4 in (Spain) Valladolid
  - Trampoline Individual winners: (Belarus) Uladzislau Hancharou (m) / (China) LIU Lingling (f)
  - Trampoline Synchronized winners: Japan (Daiki Kishi & Ryosuke Sakai) (m) / Ukraine (Maryna Kyiko & Svitlana Malkova) (f)
  - Tumbling winners: (Russia) Vadim Afanasev (m) / (Belgium) Tachina Peeters (f)
  - Double Mini winners: (Russia) Mikhail Zalomin (m) / (Russia) Aleksandra Bonartseva (f)
- November 28 – December 1: 2019 Trampoline World Championships in (Japan) Tokyo
