= Luke Whitehouse =

British artistic gymnast (born 2002)

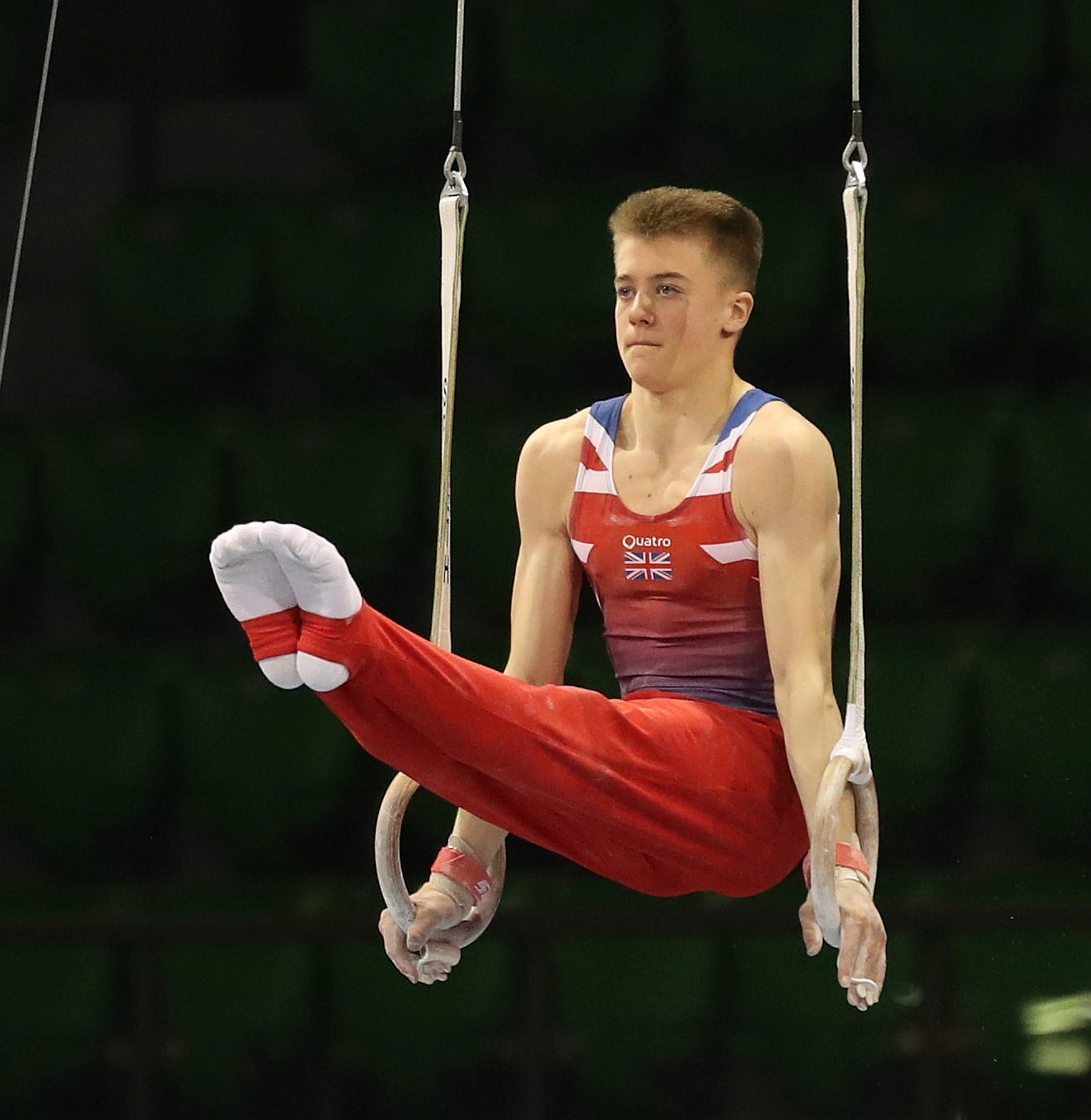
- Whitehouse competing on rings at the 2019 Junior World Artistic Gymnastics Championships

Personal information
- Full name: Luke Benjamin Whitehouse
- Born: 2 July 2002 (age 24) Halifax, West Yorkshire, England

Gymnastics career
- Discipline: Men's artistic gymnastics
- Country represented: (United Kingdom) Great Britain; England; (2019–present)
- Club: Leeds Gymnastics Club
- Head coaches: Andy Butcher; David Murray; Tom Rawlinson
Medal record
Representing Great Britain
World Championships
Silver medal – second place	2025 Jakarta	Floor exercise
European Championships
Gold medal – first place	2023 Antalya	Floor exercise
Gold medal – first place	2024 Rimini	Floor exercise
Gold medal – first place	2025 Leipzig	Team
Gold medal – first place	2025 Leipzig	Floor exercise
Bronze medal – third place	2023 Antalya	Team
World University Games
Gold medal – first place	2025 Rhine-Ruhr	Floor exercise
FIG World Cup
Event	1st	2nd	3rd
Apparatus World Cup	0	1	1
World Challenge Cup	0	0	1
Total	0	1	2
Representing England
Commonwealth Games
Gold medal – first place	2026 Glasgow	Floor exercise
Silver medal – second place	2026 Glasgow	Team
Silver medal – second place	2026 Glasgow	Vault

Luke Benjamin Whitehouse (born 2 July 2002) is a British artistic gymnast. He represented Great Britain at the 2024 Summer Olympics and is a silver medallist on floor exercise at the 2025 World Championships. Whitehouse is a four-time European Champion, winning three titles on floor exercise in 2023, 2024, and 2025. He is one of only two men to achieve three consecutive titles in the event (the other being Italian Franco Minicelli in 1964) and is the first male British gymnast to win three consecutive European apparatus titles. He also won gold as part of the Great Britain team at the 2025 European Championships and bronze at the 2023 European Championships. Whitehouse won gold on floor exercise. at the 2025 FISU World University Games, becoming the first male British gymnast to win a medal since its inception in 1959.

== Gymnastics career ==
At the junior level, Whitehouse represented Great Britain at the 2019 European Youth Olympic Festival in Baku, Azerbaijan, where the team placed fourth. He also competed at the inaugural 2019 Junior World Championships in Győr, Hungary.

=== 2021–2024 ===
As a senior, Whitehouse competed at the 2021 Osijek World Challenge Cup. During the qualification round, he became the first British gymnast to complete a triple back somersault in competition on floor exercise.

At the 2022 English Championships, Whitehouse won bronze in the all-around and won gold on floor exercise and bronze on vault. At the 2022 British Championships, he won bronze on floor exercise.

At the 2023 English Championships, Whitehouse won gold on parallel bars and floor exercise, defending his 2022 title. He also won silver on Vault.

Whitehouse attended the 2023 Doha World Cup and won bronze on floor exercise. At the 2023 British Championships, he won gold on floor exercise and bronze on vault.

Whitehouse competed at the 2023 European Championships where he won gold on floor exercise and helped Great Britain win team bronze. He was later selected as the travelling alternate for the 2023 World Championships where the team placed fourth.

At the 2024 English Championships, Whitehouse placed fourth in the all-around but won silver on vault. At the 2024 British Championships, he won bronze on vault and placed sixth in the all-around and fourth on rings. Whitehouse competed at the 2024 Doha World Cup and won silver on floor exercise. A week later he retained his title as European Champion on floor exercise at the 2024 European Championships where he competed as an individual. He was able to participate after Max Whitlock dropped out of the competition due to injury, allowing Whitehouse to defend his title. He became the first male British gymnast to retain a European title. He placed sixth on vault.

In June 2024, Whitehouse was selected to represent Great Britain at the 2024 Summer Olympics alongside Jake Jarman, Harry Hepworth, Joe Fraser, and Max Whitlock. Great Britain qualified for the team final in third, but ultimately placed fourth, with the USA taking bronze. Whitehouse individually qualified for the Olympic floor exercise final, where he ended up finishing in sixth place with a score of 14.466.

=== 2025–present ===
At the 2025 British Championships, Whitehouse won gold on floor exercise and bronze in the all-around. He was selected to compete at the 2025 European Championships alongside Harry Hepworth, Jamie Lewis, Jonas Rushworth, and Jake Jarman, where he helped Great Britain win their third European team title. He also qualified for the all-around and floor exercise finals. In the all-around, Whitehouse finished twenty-second despite qualifying in third due to errors on pommel horse and horizontal bar. Whitehouse won gold on floor exercise, winning his third consecutive European title on the apparatus. He became the first male British gymnast to win three back-to-back titles on the same apparatus. He is the first gymnast since Franco Menichelli in 1965 to win three consecutive titles on floor exercise. Whitehouse was selected to compete at the 2025 World University Games where he won gold on floor exercise. In doing so, he became the first British male gymnast to win a medal at the FISU World University Games since its inception in 1959.

In late September Whitehouse was selected to represent Great Britain at the 2025 World Championships. He qualified for the floor exercise final where he won his first world medal, a silver behind teammate Jake Jarman.

Whitehouse was selected to represent Team England at the 2026 Commonwealth Games in Glasgow alongside Adam Tobin, Alex Yolshin-Cash, Joshua Nathan, and Max Whitlock (later replaced by Gabriel Langton). Together the team won silver behind Canada despite Langton suffering a "sickening fall" off the horizontal bar in the final rotation. Individually Whitehouse qualified to the all-around, floor exercise, and vault event finals. During the all-around final, Whitehouse suffered a few falls and ended the competition in seventh place. On the first day of event finals, Whitehouse won gold on floor exercise. On the final day of competition he won silver on vault behind Félix Dolci.

== Competitive history ==
Competitive history of Luke Whitehouse
Year	Event	Team	AA	FX	PH	SR	VT	PB	HB
2019	European Youth Olympic Festival	4		R3				R3	
2019	Junior World Championships		23	R2					
2021	Osijek Challenge Cup			8					
2022	English Championships		3rd place, bronze medalist(s)	1st place, gold medalist(s)			3rd place, bronze medalist(s)		
2022	British Championships		12	3rd place, bronze medalist(s)	8	5	7		
2023	English Championships		4	1st place, gold medalist(s)			2nd place, silver medalist(s)	1st place, gold medalist(s)	
2023	Doha World Cup			3rd place, bronze medalist(s)					
2023	British Championships		8	1st place, gold medalist(s)		6	3rd place, bronze medalist(s)		
2023	European Championships	3rd place, bronze medalist(s)		1st place, gold medalist(s)					
2023	Paris Challenge Cup			3rd place, bronze medalist(s)					
2023	World Championships	4 (Note: Whitehouse was the team GBR alternate)							
2024	English Championships		4				2nd place, silver medalist(s)		
2024	British Championships		6			4	3rd place, bronze medalist(s)		
2024	Doha World Cup			2nd place, silver medalist(s)					
2024	European Championships			1st place, gold medalist(s)			6		
2024	Olympic Games	4		6					
2025	British Championships	1st place, gold medalist(s)	3rd place, bronze medalist(s)	1st place, gold medalist(s)					
2025	European Championships	1st place, gold medalist(s)	22	1st place, gold medalist(s)					
2025	World University Games	9		1st place, gold medalist(s)					
2025	World Championships	—N/a		2nd place, silver medalist(s)					
2026	English Championships					9		3rd place, bronze medalist(s)	
2026	British Championships	1st place, gold medalist(s)		3rd place, bronze medalist(s)				4	
2026	Osijek World Cup						6		
2026	Commonwealth Games	2nd place, silver medalist(s)	7	1st place, gold medalist(s)			2nd place, silver medalist(s)		
