= Joshua Nathan =

British artistic gymnast

- Born: 25 September 1999 (age 26) Nottingham, England

Gymnastics career
- Discipline: Men's artistic gymnastics
- Country represented: (United Kingdom) Great Britain
- Club: City of Birmingham Gymnastics Club
Medal record
Men's artistic gymnastics
Representing Great Britain
European Championships
Bronze medal – third place	2023 Antalya	Team
FIG World Cup
Event / 1st / 2nd / 3rd; World Challenge Cup / 2 / 0 / 1
Representing England
Commonwealth Games
Silver medal – second place	2026 Glasgow	Team

Joshua Nathan (born 25 September 1999) is a British artistic gymnast. He won team bronze at the 2023 European Championships and was the 2021 British all-around and pommel horse champion.

== Early life and education ==
Born in Nottingham, his parents moved to Birmingham when he was 11 to pursue gymnastics. He later attended Birmingham City University.

== Gymnastics career ==
At the 2016 Junior European Championships, he was part of the British team which won gold alongside Joe Fraser and Giarnni Regini-Moran.

=== 2019 ===
In the 2019 World Cup series, he won gold on pommel horse in the Szombathely and Paris events.

=== 2021 ===
At the British Championships, Nathan was all-around and pommel horse champion, as well as silver medallist on horizontal bar and bronze on parallel bars. He was named in the squad for the 2021 World Championships where he qualified for individual all-around and pommel horse finals. Nathan placed 9th in the all-around final and 6th on pommel horse.

=== 2023 ===
At the British Championships, Nathan took gold on pommel horse and bronze on parallel bars. He was named in the British team attending the 2023 European Championships, alongside Jake Jarman, Adam Tobin, Courtney Tulloch and Luke Whitehouse, where he helped win bronze in the team competition.

=== 2026 ===
At the English Championships, Nathan won bronze in the all-around, winning a gold medal on pommel horse. He competed at the 2026 Koper World Challenge Cup where he won bronze on pommel horse.

Nathan was selected to represent Team England at the 2026 Commonwealth Games in Glasgow alongside Luke Whitehouse, Alex Yolshin-Cash, Adam Tobin, and Max Whitlock (later replaced by Gabriel Langton). Together the team won silver behind Canada despite Langton suffering a "sickening fall" off the horizontal bar in the final rotation. Individually, Nathan qualified to floor exercise final where he ultimately finished seventh.

== Competitive history ==
Competitive history of Joshua Nathan
Year	Event	Team	AA	FX	PH	SR	VT	PB	HB
2019
2019	Szombathely World Challenge Cup				1st place, gold medalist(s)				
2019	Paris World Challenge Cup				1st place, gold medalist(s)				
2021	British Championships		1st place, gold medalist(s)		1st place, gold medalist(s)			3rd place, bronze medalist(s)	2nd place, silver medalist(s)
2021	Koper World Challenge Cup								5
2021	European Championships		12		7				
2021	World Championships		9		6				
2022	British Championships				3rd place, bronze medalist(s)				2nd place, silver medalist(s)
2022	Cottbus World Cup							4	
2023	British Championships				1st place, gold medalist(s)			3rd place, bronze medalist(s)	
2023	Varna World Challenge Cup						7		
2023	European Championships	3rd place, bronze medalist(s)							
2025	Cottbus World Cup				5			8	
2026	English Championships		3rd place, bronze medalist(s)		1st place, gold medalist(s)			6	8
2026	British Championships		5		2nd place, silver medalist(s)			6	8
2026	Koper World Challenge Cup				3rd place, bronze medalist(s)				
2026	Commonwealth Games	2nd place, silver medalist(s)		7					
