= Reuben Ward =

Scottish artistic gymnast

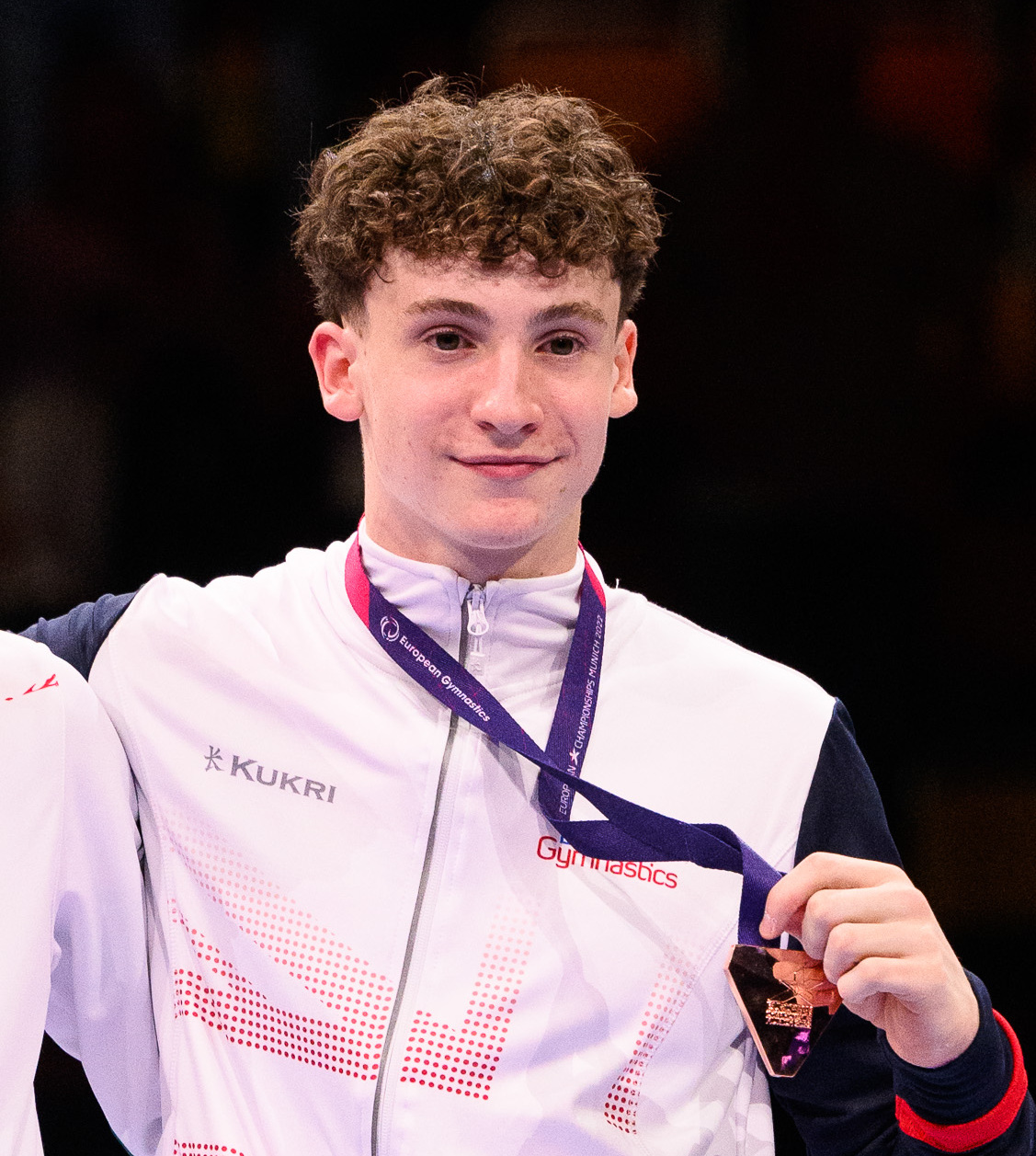
- Ward at the 2022 European Championships

Personal information
- Full name: Reuben Carroll Ward
- Born: 19 July 2005 (age 21) Crumpsall, Greater Manchester, United Kingdom

Gymnastics career
- Discipline: Men's artistic gymnastics
- Country represented: (United Kingdom) Great Britain; Scotland; (2022–present)
- Club: Manchester Academy of Gymnastics
Medal record
Representing Great Britain
Junior European Championships
Bronze medal – third place	2022 Munich	Team
Bronze medal – third place	2022 Munich	All-around
Representing Scotland
Commonwealth Games
Gold medal – first place	2026 Glasgow	All-around
Silver medal – second place	2026 Glasgow	Pommel horse
Northern European Championships
Bronze medal – third place	2023 Halmstad	Pommel horse

Reuben Carroll Ward (born 19 July 2005) is a Scottish artistic gymnast. He is the 2026 Commonwealth Games all-around champion and pommel horse silver medalist.

== Early life ==
Ward was born in Crumpsall to Scottish parents, Brendan and Lisa Ward, who left East Kilbride before Ward was born. He was raised in Bury, Greater Manchester.

== Gymnastics career ==
Ward competed at the 2022 European Youth Olympic Festival where he helped Great Britain finish second as a team. He next competed at the 2022 Junior European Championships where he helped Great Britain win bronze as a team. Individually he won bronze in the all-around behind Botond Molnár and Daniel Carrión.

At the 2026 Commonwealth Games, Ward became the first Scottish gymnast to win the all-around title. The following day he won silver on pommel horse behind Jordan Carroll of Canada. At the conclusion of the competition, Ward was selected as Scotland's flag bearer for the closing ceremony.

Ward was selected to represent Great Britain at the 2026 World Championships alongside Joe Fraser, Courtney Tulloch, Jake Jarman, Harry Hepworth, and alternate Jonas Rushworth.

== Competitive history ==
Competitive history of Reuben Ward
Year	Event	Team	AA	FX	PH	SR	VT	PB	HB
2018	Scottish Championships (U-14)		1st place, gold medalist(s)	1st place, gold medalist(s)	1st place, gold medalist(s)	1st place, gold medalist(s)	1st place, gold medalist(s)	1st place, gold medalist(s)	1st place, gold medalist(s)
2018	British Championships (U-14)		5	2nd place, silver medalist(s)	1st place, gold medalist(s)		1st place, gold medalist(s)	8	6
2019	British Championships (U-14)		2nd place, silver medalist(s)						
2021	British Championships (U-16)		7				3rd place, bronze medalist(s)		
2022	Scottish Championships (U-18)		1st place, gold medalist(s)		1st place, gold medalist(s)	1st place, gold medalist(s)	1st place, gold medalist(s)	6	1st place, gold medalist(s)
2022	English Championships (guest)		1st place, gold medalist(s)						
2022	British Championships (U-18)		1st place, gold medalist(s)	4	1st place, gold medalist(s)	4	8	8	8
2022	European Youth Olympic Festival	2nd place, silver medalist(s)	7		8				
2022	Junior European Championships	3rd place, bronze medalist(s)	3rd place, bronze medalist(s)		8				
2023	Scottish Championships (U-18)		1st place, gold medalist(s)	1st place, gold medalist(s)	4	5		7	1st place, gold medalist(s)
2023	British Championships (U-18)		3rd place, bronze medalist(s)		4	6	8	8	
2023	Austrian Future Cup	3rd place, bronze medalist(s)	1st place, gold medalist(s)		5	5			
2023	Northern European Championships	5	6		3rd place, bronze medalist(s)			6	9
2024	Scottish Championships		4						
2024	English Championships (guest)		1st place, gold medalist(s)						
2024	British Championships		4		4	7			2nd place, silver medalist(s)
2025	Welsh Championships (guest)		4						
2025	Scottish Championships		1st place, gold medalist(s)		3rd place, bronze medalist(s)			1st place, gold medalist(s)	2nd place, silver medalist(s)
2025	British Championships		14		4				
2025	Koper World Challenge Cup						6		7
2025	British Team Championships	8							
2026	Welsh Championships (guest)				4				1st place, gold medalist(s)
2026	Scottish Championships		1st place, gold medalist(s)	1st place, gold medalist(s)	1st place, gold medalist(s)			1st place, gold medalist(s)	1st place, gold medalist(s)
2026	English Championships (guest)				1st place, gold medalist(s)				
2026	British Championships		4		1st place, gold medalist(s)			5	6
2026	Varna World Challenge Cup				10				15
2026	British Team Championships	6							
2026	Commonwealth Games	4	1st place, gold medalist(s)	6	2nd place, silver medalist(s)			5	
2026	World Championships	4			R1				
