= Bangladesh at the 2026 Commonwealth Games =

- Flag of Bangladesh
- CG code: BAN
- CGA: Bangladesh Olympic Association
- Website: nocban.org

in Glasgow, Scotland 23 July 2026 – 2 August 2026
- Competitors: 15 in 4 sports
- Flag bearer: Samiul Islam Rafi
- Baton bearer: Sonia Aktar
- Medals: Gold 0 Silver 0 Bronze 0 Total 0

Commonwealth Games appearances (overview)
- 1978; 1982–1986; 1990; 1994; 1998; 2002; 2006; 2010; 2014; 2018; 2022; 2026; 2030

Bangladesh competed at the 2026 Commonwealth Games in Glasgow, Scotland. This marked Bangladesh's 11th participation at the games, after making its debut at the 1978 Commonwealth Games.

The King's Baton relay stopped in Bangladesh in December 2025. The Bangladesh team competed in four sports: athletics, artistic gymnastics, boxing and swimming. The Bangladesh team consisted of 15 athletes (11 men and four women). Swimmer Samiul Islam Rafi was the country's opening ceremony flagbearer. Meanwhile, swimmer Sonia Aktar was the baton bearer during the opening ceremony.

The Bangladesh Olympic Association secretary general Jubaidur Rahman Ranateam acknowledged that the team is unusually small for Bangladesh, describing it as a 'token delegation' to protect Bangladesh's status in the movement. Bangladesh was particularly effected by the reduced programme for 2026, with its most successful sports largely excluded.

The Bangladeshi team did not win a medal at these edition of the Commonwealth Games.

== Competitors ==
The following is the list of number of competitors participating at the Games per sport/discipline.

Sport	Men	Women	Total
Artistic gymnastics	3	0	3
Athletics	3	2	5
Boxing	2	1	3
Swimming	3	1	4
Total	11	4	15

== Artistic Gymnastics ==
Bangladesh nominated three male gymnasts. As a consequence, they were entered in the men's team event, which took place alongside the individual qualification phase.

Men
Team Final & Individual Qualification

Athlete	Event	Apparatus						Total	Rank
Athlete	Event	FL	PH	SR	VT	PB	HB	Total	Rank
Shishir Ahmed	Team	10.250	2.050	8.950	11.700	9.300	7.500	49.750	30
Rajib Chakma	Team	10.450	9.500	10.700	11.650	9.550	8.600	60.450	28
Abu Saeed Rafi	Team	5.300	8.850	5.900	11.650	10.000	9.450	51.150	29
Total	Team	26.000	20.400	25.550	35.000	28.850	25.550	161.350	8

== Athletics ==
Bangladesh entered five athletes, three males and two females.

Key

Ranks given for track events are within the athlete's heat only.

- Q = Qualified for the next round
- q = Qualified for the next round as a fastest loser or, in field events, by position without achieving the qualifying target

Track

Athlete	Event	Heat		Semifinal		Final	
Athlete	Event	Result	Rank	Result	Rank	Result	Rank
Imranur Rahman	Men's 100 metres	10.39	3	Did not Advance			
Lushad Islam	Men's 400 metres	49.76	6	Did not Advance			
Najimul Hossain Roni	Men's 400 metres hurdles	52.90	7	—N/a		Did not advance	
Shirin Akter	Women's 100 metres	12.39	7	Did not Advance			

Field event

Athlete	Event	Qualification		Final	
Athlete	Event	Distance	Rank	Distance	Rank
Swapna Khatun	Women's long jump	5.43	11	Did not advance	

== Boxing ==
Bangladesh entered three boxers (two men and one woman). Zinnat Ferdous became the first female boxer to represent Bangladesh at the Commonwealth Games.

Athlete	Event	Round of 32	Round of 16	Quarterfinals	Semifinals	Final	
Athlete	Event	Opposition Result	Opposition Result	Opposition Result	Opposition Result	Opposition Result	Rank
Rakib Hossain	Men's 55 kg	Tetekana (SOL); W RSC	Inoino (PNG); W 5–0	Dixon (AUS); L RSC	Did not advance		
Ruhin Reza	Men's 60 kg	Bye	Ndevelo (NAM); L 0–5	Did not advance			
Zinnat Ferdous	Women's 51 kg	—N/a	Fryers (NIR); L 0–5	Did not advance			

== Swimming ==
Bangladesh selected four swimmers, three men and one woman.

Athlete	Event	Heat		Semifinal		Final	
Athlete	Event	Time	Rank	Time	Rank	Time	Rank
Kajol Mia	Men's 200 m butterfly	2:12.52	16	—N/a		Did not advance	
Kajol Mia	Men's 400 m freestyle	4:14.69	21	—N/a		Did not advance	
Samiul Islam Rafi	Men's 50 m backstroke	26.57	19	Did not advance			
Samiul Islam Rafi	Men's 50 m butterfly	25.23	36	Did not advance			
Samiul Islam Rafi	Men's 100 m freestyle	52.49	40	Did not advance			
Sukumar Rajbongshi	Men's 50 m breaststroke	30.90	44	Did not advance			
Sukumar Rajbongshi	Men's 100 m breaststroke	1:10.39	39	Did not advance			
Sonia Akter	Women's 50 m butterfly	32.71	51	Did not advance			
Sonia Akter	Women's 100 m freestyle	1:07.70	61	Did not advance			
