= Adam Tobin =

British artistic gymnast

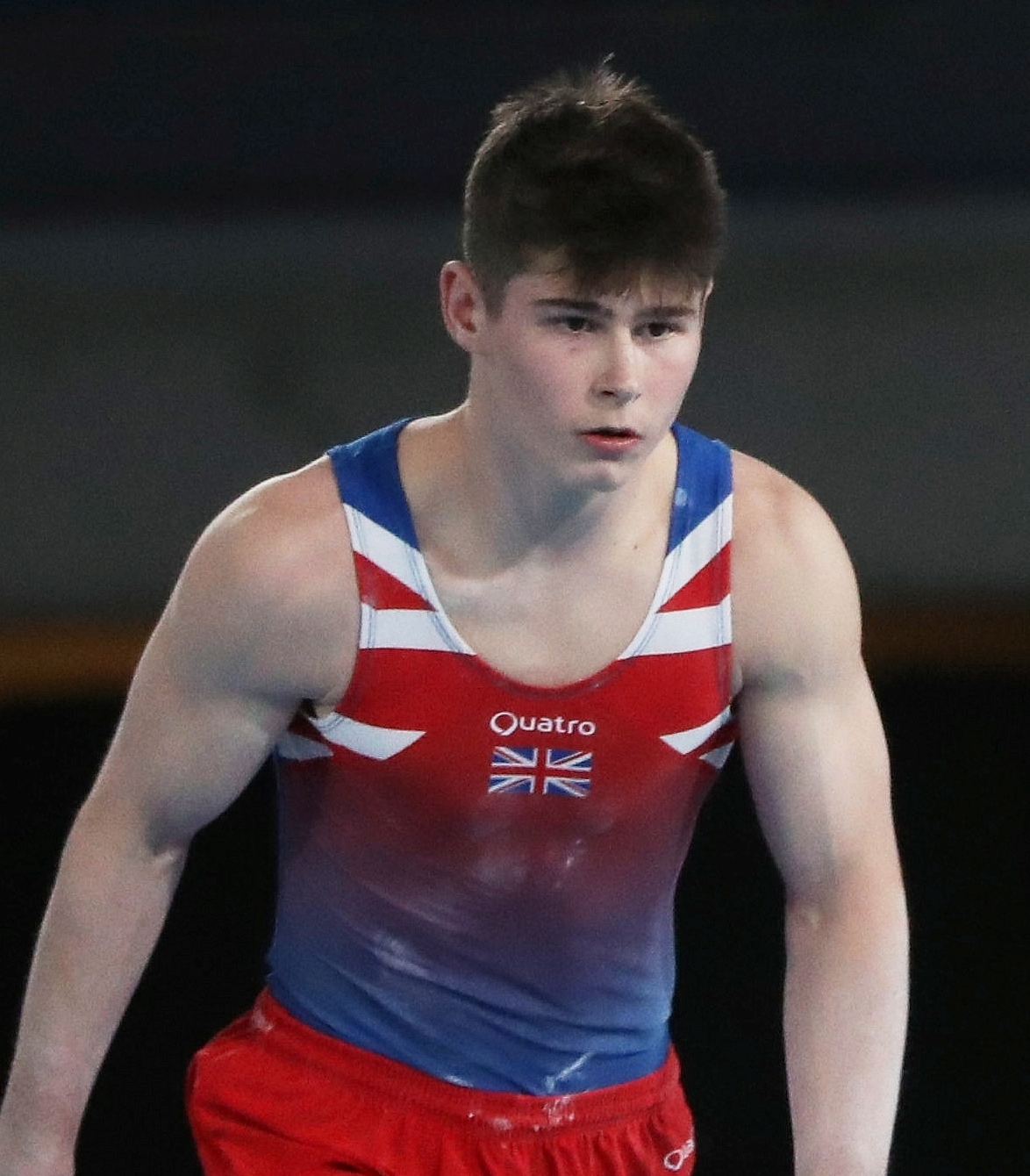
- Tobin at the 2018 Youth Olympics

Personal information
- Full name: Adam Thomas Tobin
- Born: 2 February 2001 (age 25) Barnstaple, England

Gymnastics career
- Discipline: Men's artistic gymnastics
- Country represented: (United Kingdom) Great Britain; England; (2018–present)
- Club: Notts Gymnastics Academy; Falcons Gymnastics Academy (formerly)
Medal record
Representing Great Britain
European Championships
Bronze medal – third place	2023 Antalya	Team
Representing England
Commonwealth Games
Silver medal – second place	2026 Glasgow	Team

Adam Thomas Tobin (born 2 February 2001) is an English Artistic gymnast. He won team bronze at the 2023 European Championships and was the 2023 British all-around and high bar champion.

== Gymnastics career ==
=== 2018 ===
In 2018, Tobin was named junior all-around champion at the British Championships. He was selected to represent Great Britain at the 2018 Junior European Championships alongside Jake Jarman, Jamie Lewis, Pavel Karnejenko and Donnell Osborne, where they took silver in the team competition.

Later that year, Tobin attended the 2018 Summer Youth Olympics, where he finished 5th in the all-around, on still rings and horizontal bar, 7th on floor exercise and 9th on pommel horse.

=== 2022 ===
At 2022 British Championships Tobin placed 5th in the all-around, 4th on rings and 5th on parallel bars. He was named as a reserve for the 2022 World Championships.

=== 2023 ===
At the English Championships, Tobin won bronze in the all-around and on floor as well as winning silver on still rings. In 2023 Tobin was named 2023 all-around and high bar champion at the British Gymnastics Championships. He also won silver on parallel bars and bronze on still rings.

He was named in the British team attending the 2023 European Championships, alongside Jake Jarman, Joshua Nathan, Courtney Tulloch and Luke Whitehouse, where he helped win bronze in the team competition.

Tobin represented Great Britain at the 2023 Osijek Challenge Cup.

=== 2024 ===
At the 2024 British Championships, Tobin won silver on parallel bars and placed fifth in the all-around. He represented Great Britain at the 2024 Osijek Challenge Cup where he placed 4th on high bar, 5th on pommels and 6th on parallel bars. He then attended the 2024 Doha World Cup. Tobin was named as reserve for the 2024 European Championships.

=== 2025 ===
Tobin won all-around bronze at the 2025 English Championships. At 2025 British Championships Tobin took bronze on floor and on horizontal bar.

=== 2026 ===
Tobin attended the 2026 Cottbus World Cup, where he qualified for the parallel bars final, finishing seventh. At the English Championships, Tobin won silver in the all-around and on floor exercise, parallel bars and high bar.

Tobin was selected to represent Team England at the 2026 Commonwealth Games in Glasgow alongside Luke Whitehouse, Alex Yolshin-Cash, Joshua Nathan, and Max Whitlock (later replaced by Gabriel Langton). Together the team won silver behind Canada despite Langton suffering a "sickening fall" off the horizontal bar in the final rotation. Individually, Tobin qualified to the all-around, pommel horse, rings, and parallel bars event finals. During the all-around final, he performed cleanly and placed fifth overall. On the first day of event finals, he finished eighth on pommel horse and sixth on rings. On the final day of the competition, Tobin placed sixth on parallel bars.

== Competitive history ==
Competitive history of Adam Tobin at the junior level
Year	Event	Team	AA	FX	PH	SR	VT	PB	HB
2018	English Championships		2nd place, silver medalist(s)	2nd place, silver medalist(s)	3rd place, bronze medalist(s)	2nd place, silver medalist(s)		3rd place, bronze medalist(s)	1st place, gold medalist(s)
2018	British Championships		1st place, gold medalist(s)						
2018	European Championships	2nd place, silver medalist(s)							
2018	Youth Olympic Games		5	7	9	5		5	
2019	English Championships	2nd place, silver medalist(s)			1st place, gold medalist(s)	2nd place, silver medalist(s)		1st place, gold medalist(s)	3rd place, bronze medalist(s)
2019	British Championships		3rd place, bronze medalist(s)						

Competitive history of Adam Tobin at the senior level
Year	Event	Team	AA	FX	PH	SR	VT	PB	HB
2019	Osijek World Challenge Cup								7
2019	Koper World Challenge Cup							6	6
2021	Varna World Challenge Cup					21		21	
2022	English Championships					3rd place, bronze medalist(s)		3rd place, bronze medalist(s)	
2022	British Championships		5			4		5	
2023	English Championships		3rd place, bronze medalist(s)	3rd place, bronze medalist(s)		2nd place, silver medalist(s)			
2023	British Championships		1st place, gold medalist(s)			3rd place, bronze medalist(s)		2nd place, silver medalist(s)	1st place, gold medalist(s)
2023	European Championships	3rd place, bronze medalist(s)							
2023	Osijek World Challenge Cup							WD	
2024	English Championships			2nd place, silver medalist(s)					
2024	British Championships		5					2nd place, silver medalist(s)	
2024	Osijek World Challenge Cup				5			6	4
2024	Doha World Cup			9					
2025	English Championships		3rd place, bronze medalist(s)						
2025	British Championships		3rd place, bronze medalist(s)						3rd place, bronze medalist(s)
2026	Welsh Championships (open)		1st place, gold medalist(s)						
2026	Cottbus World Cup							7	
2026	English Championships		2nd place, silver medalist(s)	2nd place, silver medalist(s)		7		2nd place, silver medalist(s)	2nd place, silver medalist(s)
2026	British Championships		6		7			7	
2026	Commonwealth Games	2nd place, silver medalist(s)	5		8	6		6	
