= Athletics at the 2014 Lusofonia Games – Results =

These are the full results of the athletics competition at the 2014 Lusophone Games which took place on 23–25 and 27 January 2014 in Bambolim in the Indian state of Goa.

== Men's results ==
=== 100 meters ===
Heats – 23 January

Rank	Heat	Name	Nationality	Time	Notes
1	1	Osvaldo Morais	Angola	10.82	Q
2	2	Denielsan Martins	Cape Verde	10.86	Q, NR
3	2	Husandeep Singh	India	10.94	Q
4	2	Yang Zi Xian	Macau	11.01	Q
5	1	Irfan Shaikh	India	11.03	Q
5	2	Mauro Gaspar	Angola	11.03	q
7	1	Umanga Surendra	Sri Lanka	11.05	Q
8	1	João Barros	São Tomé and Príncipe	11.08	q
9	1	Pao Hin Fong	Macau	11.33	
10	2	Christopher da Costa Vaz	São Tomé and Príncipe	11.75	
	1	Holder da Silva	Guinea-Bissau	DNS	

Final – 23 January

Rank	Lane	Name	Nationality	Time	Notes
1st place, gold medalist(s)	3	Osvaldo Morais	Angola	10.67	
2nd place, silver medalist(s)	5	Denielsan Martins	Cape Verde	10.75	NR
3rd place, bronze medalist(s)	1	Mauro Gaspar	Angola	10.91	
4	7	Umanga Surendra	Sri Lanka	10.99	
5	4	Irfan Shaikh	India	11.07	
	2	João Barros	São Tomé and Príncipe	DQ	
	6	Husandeep Singh	India	DQ	
	8	Yang Zi Xian	Macau	DNS	

=== 200 meters ===
Heats – 25 January

Rank	Heat	Name	Nationality	Time	Notes
1	2	Holder da Silva	Guinea-Bissau	21.96	Q
2	1	Mohamed Ashrafu	Sri Lanka	22.38	Q
3	1	Mauro Gaspar	Angola	22.39	Q
4	2	Prisca Baltazar	Angola	22.59	Q
5	1	Saleem Shekh	India	22.61	Q
6	2	Denielsan Martins	Cape Verde	22.70	Q
7	2	Leong Wang Kuong	Macau	22.94	q
8	2	Andy Fernandes	India	23.14	q
9	1	Alex dos Anjos	São Tomé and Príncipe	23.20	
10	2	João Barros	São Tomé and Príncipe	23.34	
11	1	Lam Kin Hang	Macau	23.48	
	1	Bruno Moniz	Cape Verde	DNS	

Final – 25 January

Rank	Lane	Name	Nationality	Time	Notes
1st place, gold medalist(s)	4	Holder da Silva	Guinea-Bissau	21.40	GR
2nd place, silver medalist(s)	8	Denielsan Martins	Cape Verde	21.95	
3rd place, bronze medalist(s)	3	Prisca Baltazar	Angola	22.16	
4	6	Mauro Gaspar	Angola	22.17	
5	5	Mohamed Ashrafu	Sri Lanka	22.40	
6	1	Leong Wang Kuong	Macau	22.45	
7	7	Saleem Shekh	India	22.49	
8	2	Andy Fernandes	India	22.57	

=== 400 meters ===
Heats – 23 January

Rank	Heat	Name	Nationality	Time	Notes
1	1	Maurício Alves	Cape Verde	49.49	Q
2	2	Izequiel Evora	Cape Verde	50.72	Q
3	1	Kevin Oliveira	Angola	51.04	Q
4	2	Ao Ieong Ka Hou	Macau	51.32	Q
5	2	Alex dos Anjos	São Tomé and Príncipe	51.43	Q
6	2	Cassius Fernandes	India	53.10	q
7	1	Tang Chan Tong	Macau	53.77	q
8	2	Samuel dos Santos	Timor-Leste	54.31	
	1	~~Sumit Malik~~	India	~~48.49~~	Q

Final – 24 January

Rank	Lane	Name	Nationality	Time	Notes
1st place, gold medalist(s)	3	Maurício Alves	Cape Verde	49.40	
2nd place, silver medalist(s)	8	Kevin Oliveira	Angola	49.81	
3rd place, bronze medalist(s)	5	Izequiel Evora	Cape Verde	50.78	
4	7	Alex dos Anjos	São Tomé and Príncipe	51.34	
5	6	Ao Ieong Ka Hou	Macau	51.65	
6	2	Cassius Fernandes	India	53.56	
	4	~~Sumit Malik~~	India	~~48.82~~	DQ
	1	Tang Chan Tong	Macau	DNS	

=== 800 meters ===
25 January

Rank	Name	Nationality	Time	Notes
1st place, gold medalist(s)	Alberto Mamba	Mozambique	1:53.96	
2nd place, silver medalist(s)	Lalit Mathur	India	1:54.36	
3rd place, bronze medalist(s)	Maurício Alves	Cape Verde	1:55.74	
4	Indunil Herath	Sri Lanka	1:57.27	
5	Punchi Hewage Chamal	Sri Lanka	1:58.90	
6	Siddharth Gad	India	2:02.30	
7	Samuel dos Santos	Timor-Leste	2:03.15	

=== 1500 meters ===
23 January

Rank	Name	Nationality	Time	Notes
1st place, gold medalist(s)	Alberto Mamba	Mozambique	4:06.90	
2nd place, silver medalist(s)	Punchi Hewage Chamal	Sri Lanka	4:08.60	
3rd place, bronze medalist(s)	Mohammed Afsal	India	4:10.60	
4	Samuel Freire	Cape Verde	4:13.90	
5	Paulo Mota	Cape Verde	4:19.50	
6	Vikas Velip	India	4:23.00	

=== 5000 meters ===
24 January

Rank	Name	Nationality	Time	Notes
1st place, gold medalist(s)	Ruben Sança	Cape Verde	14:28.48	
2nd place, silver medalist(s)	Euclides Varela	Cape Verde	14:29.91	
3rd place, bronze medalist(s)	Alexandre João	Angola	14:37.92	
4	Francisco Caluvi	Angola	15:02.03	
5	Albin Sunny	India	15:58.47	
6	Jeovito Fernandes	India	16:36.58	

=== 10 kilometers ===
27 January

Rank	Name	Nationality	Time	Notes
1st place, gold medalist(s)	Alexandre João	Angola	30:20.19	
2nd place, silver medalist(s)	Francisco Caluvi	Angola	30:21.59	
3rd place, bronze medalist(s)	Euclides Varela	Cape Verde	30:23.14	
4	Bruno Albuquerque	Portugal	30:44.38	
5	Ruben Sança	Cape Verde	30:55.80	
6	C.P. Shiju	India	33:08.37	
7	Francisco Clemente	India	35:14.95	

=== 110 meters hurdles ===
24 January
Wind: +0.3 m/s

Rank	Lane	Name	Nationality	Time	Notes
1st place, gold medalist(s)	5	Iong Kim Fai	Macau	14.47	NR
2nd place, silver medalist(s)	3	Hashith Nirmal	Sri Lanka	14.58	
3rd place, bronze medalist(s)	2	Manamkandath Nasimudheen	India	14.72	
4	4	Aneesh Joshi	India	15.18	
5	6	Florisvaldo Estevão	Angola	15.48	

=== 400 meters hurdles ===
25 January

Rank	Lane	Name	Nationality	Time	Notes
1st place, gold medalist(s)	2	Kurt Couto	Mozambique	51.97	
2nd place, silver medalist(s)	3	Creve Machava	Mozambique	53.44	
3rd place, bronze medalist(s)	5	Nandana Gunathilaka	Sri Lanka	54.42	
4	6	Saudagar Misbahuddin	India	55.40	
5	4	Anil Ainapure	India	55.82	

=== 3000 meters steeplechase ===
25 January

Rank	Name	Nationality	Time	Notes
1st place, gold medalist(s)	Sachin Patil	India	9:09.49	
2nd place, silver medalist(s)	Naresh Maloth	India	9:20.44	
3rd place, bronze medalist(s)	José Nuno Paulo	Portugal	9:27.48	
4	Daniel Gregorio	Portugal	9:31.59	

=== 4 x 100 meters relay ===
24 January

Rank	Lane	Nation	Competitors	Time	Notes
1st place, gold medalist(s)	6	Sri Lanka	Umanga Surendra, Himasha Eashan, Mohamed Ashrafu, Ashan Hasaranga	41.38	
2nd place, silver medalist(s)	3	India	Ganesh Satpute, Ajith Itty Varghese, Robin Raju, Ritesh Choudhary	42.00	
3rd place, bronze medalist(s)	7	Macau	Pao Hin Fong, Yang Zi Xian, Lam Kin Hang, Leong Wang Kuong	42.09	
4	2	Cape Verde	Carlos Livramento, Denielsan Martins, Duane Gomes, Izequiel Evora	42.37	NR
5	5	Angola	Kevin Oliveira, Osvaldo Morais, Prisca Baltazar, Mauro Gaspar	42.37	

=== 4 x 400 meters relay ===
25 January

Rank	Nation	Competitors	Time	Notes
1st place, gold medalist(s)	Sri Lanka	Indunil Herath, Punchi Hewage Chamal, Hashith Nirmal, Nandana Gunathilaka	3:19.02	
2nd place, silver medalist(s)	Cape Verde	Bruno Moniz, Izequiel Evora, Maurício Alves, Samuel Freire	3:20.62	NR
3rd place, bronze medalist(s)	Angola	Kevin Oliveira, Osvaldo Morais, Prisca Baltazar, Florisvaldo Estevão	3:23.11	
4	Macau	Leong Wang Kuong, Ao Ieong Ka Hou, Tang Chan Tong, Tam Chon Lok	3:36.05	
	India	Sumit Malik, Lalit Mathur, Alex A., Kamberdeep Singh	~~3:22.67~~	DQ

=== High jump ===
25 January

Rank	Name	Nationality	Result	Notes
1st place, gold medalist(s)	Harshith Shashidhar	India	2.13	
2nd place, silver medalist(s)	Shreenith Mohan	India	2.11	
3rd place, bronze medalist(s)	Tiago Costa	Portugal	2.06	

=== Long jump ===
23 January

Rank	Name	Nationality	Result	Notes
1st place, gold medalist(s)	Shankar Kartik Dhamdhay	India	7.01	
2nd place, silver medalist(s)	Anik Ajay Naik	India	6.91	
3rd place, bronze medalist(s)	Bruno Moniz	Cape Verde	6.76	
4	Tam Chon Lok	Macau	6.61	
5	Yang Zi Xian	Macau	6.61	
6	Duane Gomes	Cape Verde	6.07	

=== Triple jump ===
24 January

Rank	Name	Nationality	Result	Notes
1st place, gold medalist(s)	Eranda Dinesh Fernando	Sri Lanka	15.74	
2nd place, silver medalist(s)	Zuber Mohd	India	14.92	
3rd place, bronze medalist(s)	Dhiraj Mishra	India	14.58	
4	Tam Chon Lok	Macau	14.14	

=== Shot put ===
23 January

Rank	Name	Nationality	Result	Notes
1st place, gold medalist(s)	Hubert D'Costa	India	12.32	
2nd place, silver medalist(s)	Ashwin Soares	India	9.77	
3rd place, bronze medalist(s)	Samuel dos Santos	Timor-Leste	5.32	

== Women's results ==
=== 100 meters ===
23 January

Rank	Lane	Name	Nationality	Time	Notes
1st place, gold medalist(s)	3	Archana Suseentran	India	11.98	
2nd place, silver medalist(s)	4	Ruma Sarkar	India	12.16	
3rd place, bronze medalist(s)	5	Jani Chathurangani	Sri Lanka	12.19	
4	6	Lidiane Lopes	Cape Verde	12.49	
5	2	Ieong Loi	Macau	12.64	
6	8	Gorete Semedo	São Tomé and Príncipe	12.88	
7	7	Io In Chi	Macau	13.26	

=== 200 meters ===
25 January

Rank	Lane	Name	Nationality	Time	Notes
1st place, gold medalist(s)	2	Rengitha Chellah	India	25.00	
2nd place, silver medalist(s)	8	Lidiane Lopes	Cape Verde	25.07	NR
3rd place, bronze medalist(s)	3	Danukshika Fernando	Sri Lanka	25.89	
4	4	Kirandeep Kaur	India	25.98	
5	6	Leong Ka Man	Macau	26.10	
6	7	Gorete Semedo	São Tomé and Príncipe	26.56	
	5	Vu Nga Man	Macau	DNS	

=== 400 meters ===
24 January

Rank	Lane	Name	Nationality	Time	Notes
1st place, gold medalist(s)	5	Rathna Kumari	Sri Lanka	56.72	
2nd place, silver medalist(s)	3	Vijayakumari Gowdenahalli	India	57.19	
3rd place, bronze medalist(s)	4	Leong Ka Man	Macau	58.32	
4	8	Graciela Martins	Guinea-Bissau	58.47	
5	6	Tallulah Braganca	India	1:00.16	
6	7	Ishara Madushani	Sri Lanka	1:04.30	
7	2	Iao Si Teng	Macau	1:05.31	

=== 800 meters ===
25 January

Rank	Name	Nationality	Time	Notes
1st place, gold medalist(s)	Felismina Cavela	Angola	2:16.48	
2nd place, silver medalist(s)	Priyanka Singh Patel	India	2:22.70	
3rd place, bronze medalist(s)	Iao Si Teng	Macau	2:27.18	
4	Priyaksha Gaude	India	2:32.41	

=== 1500 meters ===
23 January

Rank	Name	Nationality	Time	Notes
1st place, gold medalist(s)	Chitra Palakeezh Unnikrishan	India	4:35.37	
2nd place, silver medalist(s)	Felismina Cavela	Angola	4:41.15	
3rd place, bronze medalist(s)	Nitisha Gaonkar	India	5:04.10	
4	Nelia Martins	Timor-Leste	5:27.37	

=== 5000 meters ===
24 January

Rank	Name	Nationality	Time	Notes
1st place, gold medalist(s)	Jayashri Boragi	India	18:06.70	
2nd place, silver medalist(s)	Pooja Varade	India	18:13.26	
3rd place, bronze medalist(s)	Ernestina Paulino	Angola	18:17.20	
4	Nelia Martins	Timor-Leste	20:34.44	

=== 10 kilometers ===
27 January

Rank	Name	Nationality	Time	Notes
1st place, gold medalist(s)	Cláudia Pereira	Portugal	34:39.24	
2nd place, silver medalist(s)	Ernestina Paulino	Angola	35:16.88	
3rd place, bronze medalist(s)	Swati Gadhave	India	35:35.40	
4	Manisha Salunkhe	India	36:27.20	
5	Crisolita Silva	Cape Verde	41:07.33	
	Jamila Tavares	Cape Verde	DNF	

=== 100 meters hurdles ===
24 January
Wind: -0.2 m/s

Rank	Lane	Name	Nationality	Time	Notes
1st place, gold medalist(s)	6	Anchu Mamachan	India	14.21	
2nd place, silver medalist(s)	3	Witiney Barata	Angola	14.45	
3rd place, bronze medalist(s)	4	Silvia Panguana	Mozambique	14.76	
4	5	Maria Juliet	India	15.09	

=== 400 meters hurdles ===
25 January

Rank	Lane	Name	Nationality	Time	Notes
1st place, gold medalist(s)	3	Anu Raghavan	India	1:00.53	
2nd place, silver medalist(s)	2	Graciela Martins	Guinea-Bissau	1:02.09	NR
3rd place, bronze medalist(s)	4	Niluka Wickramasinghe	Sri Lanka	1:02.85	
4	5	Merlin Parameshwaran	India	1:03.59	

=== 4 x 100 meters relay ===
24 January

Rank	Lane	Nation	Competitors	Time	Notes
1st place, gold medalist(s)	5	India	Bhagyashree Shirke, Kirandeep Kaur, Rengitha Chellah, Neethu Mathew	47.11	
2nd place, silver medalist(s)	4	Sri Lanka	Jani Chathurangani, Chamali Priyadarshani, Danukshika Fernando, Yamuna Niranjani	47.67	
3rd place, bronze medalist(s)	3	Macau	Ieong Loi, Io In Chi, Vu Nga Man, Leong Ka Man	49.67	

=== 4 x 400 meters relay ===
25 January

Rank	Nation	Competitors	Time	Notes
1st place, gold medalist(s)	India	Vijayakumari Gowdenahalli, Merlin Parameshwaran, Anu Raghavan, Iniya Pongiyannan	3:48.75	
2nd place, silver medalist(s)	Sri Lanka	Upamalika Kumari, Niluka Wickramasinghe, Danukshika Fernando, Ishara Madushani	3:50.35	
3rd place, bronze medalist(s)	Macau	Io In Chi, Vu Nga Man, Leong Ka Man, Iao Si Teng	4:20.77	

=== High jump ===
23 January

Rank	Name	Nationality	Result	Notes
1st place, gold medalist(s)	Tintu Devassia	India	1.71	
2nd place, silver medalist(s)	Saumiya Sooriyampola	Sri Lanka	1.68	
3rd place, bronze medalist(s)	Neena Varakil	India	1.45	

=== Long jump ===
24 January

Rank	Name	Nationality	Result	Notes
1st place, gold medalist(s)	Evelise Veiga	Portugal	5.86	
2nd place, silver medalist(s)	Neena Varakil	India	5.66	
3rd place, bronze medalist(s)	Karthika Gothandapani	India	5.53	
4	Chamali Priyadarshani	Sri Lanka	5.46	
5	Silvia Panguana	Mozambique	5.30	
	Witiney Barata	Angola	DQ	

=== Triple jump ===
25 January

Rank	Name	Nationality	Result	Notes
1st place, gold medalist(s)	Bhairabi Roy	India	12.48	
2nd place, silver medalist(s)	Siva Anbarasi	India	12.31	
3rd place, bronze medalist(s)	Vanessa Rocha	Portugal	12.15	
4	Chamali Priyadarshani	Sri Lanka	12.09	

=== Shot put ===
24 January

Rank	Name	Nationality	Result	Notes
1st place, gold medalist(s)	Sílvia Cruz	Portugal	13.25	
2nd place, silver medalist(s)	Kajal Ulhaas Verenkar	India	10.38	
3rd place, bronze medalist(s)	Desiree Pereira	India	10.14	
