= Athletics at the 2014 Lusofonia Games =

Athletics at the III Lusophone Games
- Dates: 23–27 January 2014
- Host city: Bambolim, Goa, India
- Venue: GMC Athletic Stadium
- Events: 31
- Participation: 135 athletes from 10 nations
- Records set: 1 GR

The Athletics competition at the 2014 Lusophone Games took place at the GMC Athletic Stadium between 23 and 27 January 2014 in Bambolim, Goa State, India.

The competition stood at a significantly lower level than the two previous editions. Arguably the strongest Lusophone nation, Brazil, did not send any competitors while Portugal only sent a few development athletes. Taking advantage of this situation, the host nation, India, topped the medal table. Most of their athletes were representatives of the state of Goa. São Tomé and Princípe was the only nation not to medal.

== Medal summary ==
=== Men ===
Event	Gold		Silver		Bronze	
100 m	Osvaldo Morais; Angola	10.67	Denielsan Martins; Cape Verde	10.75	Mauro Gaspar; Angola	10.91
200 m	Holder da Silva; Guinea-Bissau	21.40 GR	Denielsan Martins; Cape Verde	21.95	Prisca Baltazar; Angola	22.16
400 m	Maurício Alves; Cape Verde	49.40	Kevin Oliveira; Cape Verde	49.81	Izequiel Evora; Cape Verde	49.81
800 m	Alberto Mamba; Mozambique	1:53.96	Lalit Mathur; India	1:54.36	Maurício Alves; Cape Verde	1:55.74
1500 m	Alberto Mamba; Mozambique	4:06.90	Punchi Hewage Chamal; Sri Lanka	4:08.60	Mohammed Afsal; India	4:10.60
5000 m	Ruben Sança; Cape Verde	14:28.48	Euclides Varela; Cape Verde	14:29.91	Alexandre João; Angola	14:37.92
10000 m	Alexandre João; Angola	30:20.19	Francisco Caluvi; Angola	30:21.59	Euclides Varela; Cape Verde	30:23.14
110 m hurdles	Iong Kim Fai; Macau	14.47	Hashith Nirmal; Sri Lanka	14.58	Manamkandath Nasimudheen; India	14.72
400 m hurdles	Kurt Couto; Mozambique	51.97	Creve Machava; Mozambique	53.44	Nandana Gunathilaka; Sri Lanka	54.42
3000 m steeplechase	Sachin Patil; India	9:9.49	Maloth Naresh; India	9:20.44	José Nuno Paulo; Portugal	9:27.48
4 × 100 m relay	Sri Lanka; Umanga Surendra; Himasha Eashan; Mohamed Ashrafu; Ashan Hasaranga	41.38	India; Ganesh Satpute; Ajith Itty Varghese; Robin Raju; Ritesh Choudhary	42.00	Macau; Pao Hin Fong; Yang Zi Xian; Lam Kin Hang; Leong Wang Kuong	42.09
4 ×400 m relay	Sri Lanka; Indunil Herath; Punchi Hewage Chamal; Hashith Nirmal; Nandana Gunathilaka	3:19.02	Cape Verde; Bruno Moniz; Izequiel Evora; Maurício Alves; Samuel Freire	3:20.62	Cape Verde; Kevin Oliveira; Osvaldo Morais; Prisca Baltazar; Florisvaldo Estevão	3:23.11
High jump	Harshith Shashidhar; India	2.13 m	Shreenith Mohan; India	2.11 m	Tiago Costa; Portugal	2.06 m
Long jump	Shankar Kartik Dhamdhay; India	7.01 m	Anik Ajay Naik; India	6.91 m	Bruno Moniz; Cape Verde	6.76 m
Triple jump	Eranda Dinesh Fernando; Sri Lanka	15.74 m	Zuber Mohd; India	14.92 m	Dhiraj Mishra; India	14.58 m
Shot put	Hubert D'Costa; India	12.32 m	Ashwin Soares; India	9.77 m	Samuel Marçal dos Santos; Timor-Leste	5.32 m

=== Women ===
Event	Gold		Silver		Bronze	
100 m	Archana Suseentran; India	11.98	Ruma Sarkar; India	12.16	Jani Chathurangani; Sri Lanka	12.19
200 m	Rengitha Chellah; India	25.00	Lidiane Lopes; Cape Verde	25.07	Danukshika Fernando; Sri Lanka	25.89
400 m	Rathna Kumari; Sri Lanka	56.72	Vijayakumari Gowdenahalli; India	57.19	Leong Ka Man; Macau	58.32
800 m	Felismina Cavela; Angola	2:16.48	Priyanka Singh Patel; India	2:22.70	Iao Si Teng; Macau	2:27.18
1500 m	Chitra Palakeezh Unnikrishan; India	4:35.37	Felismina Cavela; Angola	4:41.15	Nitisha Govind Gaonk; India	5:04.10
5000 m	Jayashri Boragi; India	18:06.70	Pooja Varade; India	18:13.26	Ernestina Paulino; Angola	18:17.20
10000 m	Claudia Barboso; Portugal	34:39.24	Ernestina Paulino; Angola	35:16.88	Swati Haridas Gadhave; India	35:35.40
100 m hurdles	Anchu Mamachan; India	14.21	Witiney Barata; Angola	14.45	Silvia Panguana; Mozambique	14.76
400 m hurdles	Anu Raghavan; India	60.53	Graciela Martins; Guinea-Bissau	62.09	Niluka Wickramasinghe; Sri Lanka	62.85
4 × 100 m relay	India; Bhagyashree Shirke; Kirandeep Kaur; Rengitha Chellah; Neethu Mathew	47.11	Sri Lanka; Jani Chathurangani; N.C.D. Priyadarshani; Danukshika Fernando; Yamuna Niranjani	47.67	Macau; Ieong Loi; Io In Chi; Vu Nga Man; Leong Ka Man	49.67
4 × 400 m relay	India; Vijayakumari Gowdenahalli; Merlin Parameshwaran; Anu Raghavan; Iniya Pongiyannan	3:48.75	Sri Lanka; Upamalika Kumari; Niluka Wickramasinghe; Danukshika Fernando; Ishara Madushani	3:50.35	Macau; Io In Chi; Vu Nga Man; Leong Ka Man; Iao Si Teng	4:20.77
High jump	Tintu Devassia; India	1.71 m	Saumiya Sooriyampola; Sri Lanka	1.68 m	Neena Varakil; India	1.45 m
Long jump	Evelise Veiga; Portugal	5.86 m	Neena Varakil; India	5.66 m	Karthika Gothandapani; India	5.53 m
Triple jump	Bhairabi Roy; India	12.48 m	Siva Anbarasi; India	12.31 m	Vanessa Rocha; Portugal	12.15 m
Shot put	Sílvia Cruz; Portugal	13.25 m	Kajal Ulhas Verenkar; India	10.38 m	Desiree Pereira; India	10.14 m

== Medal table ==
Rank	Nation	Gold	Silver	Bronze	Total
1	India (IND)	14	14	8	36
2	Sri Lanka (SRI)	4	5	4	13
3	Angola (ANG)	3	5	5	13
4	Mozambique (MOZ)	3	1	1	5
5	Portugal (POR)	3	0	1	4
6	Cape Verde (CPV)	2	5	4	11
7	Guinea-Bissau (GBS)	1	1	0	2
8	Macau (MAC)	1	0	5	6
9	Timor-Leste (TLS)	0	0	1	1
Totals (9 entries)		31	31	29	91

== Participation ==
- Angola (10)
- Cape Verde (13)
- Guinea-Bissau (2)
- India (62)
- Macau (13)
- Mozambique (4)
- Portugal (8)
- Sri Lanka (17)
- São Tomé and Príncipe (4)
- Timor-Leste (2)
