= List of Bissau-Guinean records in athletics =

The following are the national records in athletics in Guinea Bissau maintained by its national athletics federation: Federação de Atletismo da Guiné-Bissau (FAGB).

== Outdoor ==
Key to tables: Awaiting ratification Record not kept by FAGB Not ratified or later rescinded by FAGB

=== Men ===
Event	Record	Athlete	Date	Meet	Place	Ref.
100 m	10.36 (+0.5 m/s)	Holder da Silva	8 July 2009		Salamanca, Spain	
100 m	10.36 (+1.7 m/s)	Holder da Silva	12 July 2009	Lusophony Games	Lisbon, Portugal	
100 m	10.36 (±0.0 m/s)	Ancuiam Lopes	12 June 2013	Trofeo Caja Duero	Salamanca, Spain	
200 m	21.01 (+1.4 m/s)	Holder da Silva	8 July 2009		Salamanca, Spain	
400 m	47.70	Edivaldo Monteiro	17 July 1996		Lisbon, Portugal	
800 m	1:50.50	Danilson Riciulli	29 June 2002		Funchal, Madeira	
1500 m	4:00.41	Alfaba Bah	8 June 2007		Uster, Switzerland	
3000 m	8:50.82	Mussa Djau (Note: became a Portuguese citizen in March 2016)	25 May 2014		Beja, Portugal	
5000 m	15:45.45	Mussa Djau (Note: became a Portuguese citizen in March 2016)	19 June 2013		Beja, Portugal	
10,000 m	33:04.04	Aruna Dabo	18 July 1989	Jeux de la Francophonie	Casablanca, Morocco	
Marathon	2:29:04	Joaquim Moreira da Silva	8 November 1987		Lisbon, Portugal	
110 m hurdles	14.73	Edivaldo Monteiro	14 June 1998		Lisbon, Portugal	
400 m hurdles	50.68	Edivaldo Monteiro	20 June 1998		Lisbon, Portugal	
3000 m steeplechase	10:06.22	Mussa Djau	5 June 2013		Beja, Portugal	
High jump	1.96 m	Danilo Pereira	23 May 2008		Vendas Novas, Portugal	
Pole vault	3.80 m	Emerson Èvora	25 May 2013		Lisbon, Portugal	
Long jump	6.96 m	Edivaldo Monteiro	4 May 1996		Lisbon, Portugal	
Triple jump	13.94 m (+1.7 m/s)	Catumo Mendes	5 June 2010 (Note: by World Athletics source; 6 June 2010 by other sources)		Ivry-sur-Seine, France	
Shot put	15.15 m	Otoniel Badjana	17 June 2017	SL Benfica Meeting	Lisbon, Portugal	
Discus throw	46.54 m	Otoniel Badjana	24 July 2016		Leiria, Portugal	
Hammer throw	22.68 m	Jordão Gomes	6 February 2005		Almada, Portugal	
Javelin throw	52.71 m	Otoniel Badjana	14 May 2016		Lisbon, Portugal	
Decathlon	5514 pts	Arnaldo dos Santos Fernandes	28–29 February 1984		Santiago de Cuba, Cuba	
Decathlon	100m / Long jump / Shot put / High jump / 400m / 110m H / Discus / Pole vault / Javelin / 1500m					
20 km walk (road)						
50 km walk (road)						
4 × 100 m relay	42.31	Guinea-Bissau; Jone Fernando Co; L. Dabo; A. Lopes; Holder da Silva	2 June 2007		Bissau, Guinea-Bissau	
4 × 400 m relay	3:28.69	Guinea-Bissau	3 June 2007		Bissau, Guinea-Bissau	

=== Women ===
Event	Record	Athlete	Date	Meet	Place	Ref.
100 m	12.54	Sténia Betuncal	29 May 2010	Provas Extra CNC(FA)	Lisbon, Portugal	
200 m	25.69 (+1.0 m/s)	Artimiza Sá	11 June 2003		Lisbon, Portugal	
400 m	57.02	Artimiza Sá	5 July 2003		Guarda, Portugal	
800 m	2:13.59	Anhel Alberta Capé	16 July 2000		Braga, Portugal	
1500 m	4:59.42	Aparecida Mendes	18 June 2004		Quarteira, Portugal	
3000 m	11:02.48	Aparecida Mendes	19 January 2008		Lagos, Portugal	
5000 m	21:08.61	Jania Ignacio Barundafal	18 April 2010		Palafrugell, Spain	
10,000 m						
Marathon						
100 m hurdles	14.25 (+2.0 m/s)	Sténia Betuncal (Note: Sténia Betuncal became a Portuguese citizen on 6 May 2011)	3 July 2010	Portuguese Junior Championships	Setúbal, Portugal	
400 m hurdles	1:02.09	Graciela Martins	25 January 2014	Lusophony Games	Bambolim, India	
3000 m steeplechase	12:03.75	Suaila Sá (Note: Suaila Sá became an Italian citizen in 2015)	28 September 2014		Spilimbergo, Italy	
High jump	1.61 m	Sandra Turpin	12 May 1990		Lisbon, Portugal	
High jump	1.61 m	Plácida Mirolho	21 June 2003		Abrantes, Portugal	
Pole vault	2.55 m	Plácida Mirolho	15 June 2003		Almada, Portugal	
Pole vault	2.55 m	Plácida Mirolho	22 June 2003		Abrantes, Portugal	
Long jump	5.69 m	Fatumata Baldé	3 June 2017		Braga, Portugal	
Triple jump	11.22 m (−1.8 m/s)	Plácida Mirolho	4 January 2004		Almada, Portugal	
Shot put	16.24 m	Jessica Inchude	3 June 2017		Salamanca, Spain	
Discus throw	50.29 m	Jessica Inchude	23 July 2016		Leiria, Portugal	
Hammer throw	22.26 m	Eveline Soares	30 June 2008		Seixal, Portugal	
Hammer throw	36.96 m # (Note: Jorgina Da Costa became a Portuguese citizen on 22 April 2009)	Jorgina Da Costa	19 June 2009		Almada, Portugal	
Javelin throw	40.10 m	Josefina Da Silva	17 June 2017		Ciudad Real, Spain	
Heptathlon	2943 pts	Josefina Da Silva	1–2 May 2009		Los Realejos, Spain	
Heptathlon	100m H / High jump / Shot put / 200m / Long jump / Javelin / 800m; 19.38 / 1.25 m / 11.06 m / 29.47 / 4.36 m w / 32.10 m / 3:20.23					
20 km walk (road)						
50 km walk (road)						
4 × 100 m relay	51.41	Guinea-Bissau; A. Co; Alberta Capé; V. Sá; A. Mana	2 June 2007		Bissau, Guinea-Bissau	
4 × 400 m relay	4:21.09	Guinea-Bissau	3 June 2007		Bissau, Guinea-Bissau	

== Indoor ==
=== Men ===
Event	Record	Athlete	Date	Meet	Place	Ref.
60 m	6.80	Holder da Silva	14 February 2009		Pombal, Portugal	
200 m	22.08	Holder da Silva	3 February 2008		Espinho, Portugal	
400 m	48.90	Danilson Ricciulli	27 January 2001		Espinho, Portugal	
800 m	1:52.41	Danilson Ricciulli	1 February 2004		Espinho, Portugal	
1500 m	4:43.40	Gonçalo Costa	31 January 2009		Pombal, Portugal	
1500 m	4:11.83	Braima Dabó	9 January 2022	Campeonato Absoluto do Norte	Braga, Portugal	
2000 m	5:53.87	Braima Dabó	30 December 2020	Torneio de Ano Novo	Braga, Portugal	
3000 m	8:58.39	Braima Dabó	8 January 2022	Campeonato Absoluto do Norte	Braga, Portugal	
60 m hurdles	8.53	Edivaldo Monteiro	11 February 1996		Braga, Portugal	
High jump	1.96 m	Danilo Pereira	2 February 2008		Alpiarça, Portugal	
Pole vault	4.25 m	Émerson Évora	30 January 2016		Lisbon, Portugal	
Long jump						
Triple jump	14.47 m	Catumo Mendes	26 November 2011		Eaubonne, France	
Shot put	15.94 m	Otoniel Badjana	14 February 2017	Portuguese Championships	Pombal, Portugal	
Heptathlon						
Heptathlon	60m / Long jump / Shot put / High jump / 60m H / Pole vault / 1000m					
5000 m walk						
4 × 400 m relay						

=== Women ===
Event	Record	Athlete	Date	Meet	Place	Ref.
60 m	7.90	Artimiza Sá	24 February 2001		Espinho, Portugal	
200 m	26.45	Artimiza Sá	15 February 2004		Espinho, Portugal	
400 m	58.63	Artimiza Sá	14 February 2004		Espinho, Portugal	
800 m	2:22.36	Anhel Cape	9 February 2003		Braga, Portugal	
1500 m	5:27.14	Tania Anis	27 December 2014		Braga, Portugal	
3000 m						
60 m hurdles	8.76	Sténia Betuncal	20 February 2010		Pombal, Portugal	
High jump	1.57 m	Placida Mirolho	17 January 2004		Braga, Portugal	
Pole vault	2.30 m	Placida Mirolho	9 February 2002		Alpiarça, Portugal	
Long jump	5.54 m	Sténia Betuncal	27 February 2010		Espinho, Portugal	
Triple jump	11.74 m (Note: outdoor mark ratified as absolute record)	Sténia Betuncal	13 February 2011		Pombal, Portugal	
Shot put	18.13 m (Note: outdoor mark ratified as absolute record)	Jessica Inchude	13 February 2021	Portuguese Championships	Braga, Portugal	
Pentathlon						
Pentathlon	60m H / High jump / Shot put / Long jump / 800m					
3000 m walk						
4 × 100 m relay						
