= Mozambique at the 2010 Summer Youth Olympics =

- IOC code: MOZ
- NOC: Comité Olímpico Nacional de Moçambique

in Singapore
- Competitors: 3 in 2 sports
- Flag bearer: Silvia Panguana

Summer Youth Olympics appearances
- 2010; 2014; 2018

Mozambique competed at the 2010 Summer Youth Olympics, the inaugural Youth Olympic Games, held in Singapore from 14 August to 26 August 2010.

== Athletics ==
=== Boys ===
Track and Road Events

Athletes	Event	Qualification		Final	
Athletes	Event	Result	Rank	Result	Rank
Celso Francisco	Boys’ 200m	23.24	21 qD	22.99	19

=== Girls ===
Track and Road Events

Athletes	Event	Qualification		Final	
Athletes	Event	Result	Rank	Result	Rank
Silvia Panguana	Girls’ 100m Hurdles	15.09	17 qC	14.77	15

== Swimming ==
Athletes	Event	Heat		Semifinal		Final	
Athletes	Event	Time	Position	Time	Position	Time	Position
Gessica Stagno	Girls’ 100m Butterfly	1:10.46	31	Did not advance			
