= Athletics at the 2010 Summer Youth Olympics – Girls' 100 metre hurdles =

Athletics – Girls' 100 metres hurdles at the I Summer Youth Olympic Games
- Venue: Bishan Stadium
- Date: August 17–21
- Competitors: 18 from 18 nations

Medalists
1st place, gold medalist(s)		Ekaterina Bleskina	Russia
2nd place, silver medalist(s)		Michelle Jenneke	Australia
3rd place, bronze medalist(s)		Noemi Zbaeren	Switzerland

The girls' 100 metres hurdles event at the 2010 Youth Olympic Games was held on 17–21 August 2010 in Bishan Stadium.

== Schedule ==
Date	Time	Round
17 August 2010	10:10	Heats
21 August 2010	09:20	Final

== Results ==
=== Heats ===
Rank	Heat	Lane	Athlete	Time	Notes	Q
1	3	5	Ekaterina Bleskina (RUS)	13.32		FA
2	2	4	Megan Simmonds (JAM)	13.64	PB	FA
3	3	4	Michelle Jenneke (AUS)	13.65	PB	FA
4	2	6	Yarong Zheng (CHN)	13.76		FA
5	2	3	Noemi Zbaeren (SUI)	13.78		FA
6	1	5	Trinity Wilson (USA)	13.88		FA
7	3	3	Franziska Hofmann (GER)	13.97		FA
8	1	6	Jana Sotakova (CZE)	13.98		FA
9	3	6	Sade-Mariah Greenidge (BAR)	14.02	PB	FB
10	1	3	Kayla Gilbert (RSA)	14.19		FB
11	2	4	Nat Isaac (PUR)	14.25		FB
12	3	7	Tamara de Sousa (BRA)	14.29	PB	FB
13	3	2	Motoko Nakahara (JPN)	14.32		FB
14	2	2	Salma Abdelhamid (TUN)	14.61		FC
15	2	7	Marija Sciberras (MLT)	14.82	SB	FC
16	1	2	Wei Ning Goh (SIN)	15.01		FC
17	1	5	Silvia Panguana (MOZ)	15.09		FC
	1	4	Karolina Kołeczek (POL)	DNF		FC

=== Finals ===
==== Final C ====
Rank	Lane	Athlete	Time	Notes
1	4	Marija Sciberras (MLT)	14.69	SB
2	6	Silvia Panguana (MOZ)	14.77	PB
3	5	Salma Abdelhamid (TUN)	14.88	
4	3	Wei Ning Goh (SIN)	14.92	
	2	Karolina Kołeczek (POL)	DNS	

==== Final B ====
Rank	Lane	Athlete	Time	Notes
1	4	Sade-Mariah Greenidge (BAR)	13.83	PB
2	3	Kayla Gilbert (RSA)	14.03	
3	6	Nat Isaac (PUR)	14.08	
4	5	Tamara de Sousa (BRA)	14.12	PB
5	2	Motoko Nakahara (JPN)	14.29	

==== Final A ====
Rank	Lane	Athlete	Time	Notes
1st place, gold medalist(s)	4	Ekaterina Bleskina (RUS)	13.34	
2nd place, silver medalist(s)	6	Michelle Jenneke (AUS)	13.46	PB
3rd place, bronze medalist(s)	8	Noemi Zbaeren (SUI)	13.50	
4	5	Megan Simmonds (JAM)	13.62	PB
5	4	Yarong Zheng (CHN)	13.71	=SB
6	7	Trinity Wilson (USA)	13.71	PB
7	1	Franziska Hofmann (GER)	13.77	
8	2	Jana Sotakova (CZE)	13.99	
