= 2004 IAAF World Indoor Championships – Men's 3000 metres =

The Men's 3000 metres event at the 2004 IAAF World Indoor Championships was held on March 5–6.

== Medalists ==
Gold	Silver	Bronze
Bernard Lagat; Kenya	Rui Silva; Portugal	Markos Geneti; Ethiopia

== Results ==
=== Heat ===
First 4 of each heat (Q) and next 4 fastest (q) qualified for the semifinals.

Rank	Heat	Name	Nationality	Time	Notes
1	2	Bernard Lagat	Kenya	7:47.70	Q
2	2	Craig Mottram	Australia	7:48.09	Q, NR
3	2	Abiyote Abate	Ethiopia	7:48.25	Q
4	2	Sergio Gallardo	Spain	7:48.27	Q, PB
5	2	Serhiy Lebid	Ukraine	7:48.28	q
6	2	Kevin Sullivan	Canada	7:48.38	q
7	2	Mohammed Amyn	Morocco	7:49.92	q
8	1	Markos Geneti	Ethiopia	7:52.08	Q
9	1	Rui Silva	Portugal	7:52.14	Q
10	1	Antonio David Jiménez	Spain	7:52.25	Q
11	1	Gert-Jan Liefers	Netherlands	7:52.75	Q
12	1	Hicham Bellani	Morocco	7:53.10	q
13	1	Boaz Kisang Cheboiywo	Kenya	7:53.69	
14	1	Bolota Asmerom	United States	7:53.86	
15	1	Vyacheslav Shabunin	Russia	7:53.92	SB
16	1	John Mayock	Great Britain	7:54.41	
17	2	Jonathon Riley	United States	7:55.58	SB
18	1	Khoudir Aggoune	Algeria	7:55.94	SB
19	2	Günther Weidlinger	Austria	7:59.92	
20	2	Thomas Mayo	Great Britain	8:03.88	
21	1	Euclides Varela	Cape Verde	8:19.17	NR
22	2	Ajmal Amirov	Tajikistan	8:38.37	
	1	Dieudonné Disi	Rwanda	DNS	

=== Final ===
Rank	Name	Nationality	Time	Notes
1st place, gold medalist(s)	Bernard Lagat	Kenya	7:56.34	
2nd place, silver medalist(s)	Rui Silva	Portugal	7:57.08	
3rd place, bronze medalist(s)	Markos Geneti	Ethiopia	7:57.87	
4	Antonio David Jiménez	Spain	7:58.23	
5	Sergio Gallardo	Spain	7:58.96	
6	Gert-Jan Liefers	Netherlands	8:02.86	
7	Kevin Sullivan	Canada	8:03.34	
8	Mohammed Amyn	Morocco	8:03.50	
9	Hicham Bellani	Morocco	8:03.73	
10	Craig Mottram	Australia	8:03.82	
11	Abiyote Abate	Ethiopia	8:09.71	
12	Serhiy Lebid	Ukraine	8:14.32	
