= Cape Verde at the 2009 World Championships in Athletics =

- WA code: CPV

in Berlin
- Competitors: 2 (1 man, 1 woman)
- Medals: Gold 0 Silver 0 Bronze 0 Total 0

World Championships in Athletics appearances
- 1993; 1995; 1997; 1999; 2001; 2003; 2005; 2007; 2009; 2011; 2013; 2015; 2017; 2019; 2022; 2023

Cape Verde competes at the 2009 World Championships in Athletics from 15–23 August in Berlin.

== Team selection ==
Event	Athletes	
Event	Men	Women
1500 metres		Eva Pereira
Marathon	Nelson Cruz	

== Results ==
=== Men ===
Event	Athletes	Final	
Event	Athletes	Result	Rank
Marathon	Nelson Cruz	2:27:16 SB	59

=== Women ===
Event	Athletes	Heats		Semifinal		Final	
Event	Athletes	Result	Rank	Result	Rank	Result	Rank
1500 m	Eva Pereira	5:04.95 PB	42	did not advance			
