= Athletics at the 2003 All-Africa Games – Men's 5000 metres =

The men's 5000 metres at the 2003 All-Africa Games were held on October 15.

== Results ==
Rank	Name	Nationality	Time	Notes
1st place, gold medalist(s)	Kenenisa Bekele	Ethiopia	13:26.16	GR
2nd place, silver medalist(s)	Hailu Mekonnen	Ethiopia	13:26.73	
3rd place, bronze medalist(s)	John Kibowen	Kenya	13:29.14	
4	Markos Geneti	Ethiopia	13:30.33	
5	John Yuda Msuri	Tanzania	13:30.33	
6	Boniface Toroitich Kiprop	Uganda	13:35.45	
7	Benjamin Limo	Kenya	13:41.68	
8	Khoudir Aggoune	Algeria	13:53.15	
9	Elijah Birgen	Kenya	13:57.79	
10	Samson Kiflemariam	Eritrea	14:01.89	
11	Pascal Ntahokaraja	Burundi	14:15.40	
12	Valens Bivahagumye	Rwanda	14:24.55	
13	Euclides Varela	Cape Verde	14:53.83	
14	Ansu Sowe	Gambia	15:26.23	
	Dieudonné Gahungu	Burundi	DNS	
	Jules Yadagba	Central African Republic	DNS	
	Ali Abdela	Eritrea	DNS	
	Zersenay Tadese	Eritrea	DNS	
	John Kayange	Malawi	DNS	
	Fabian Joseph	Tanzania	DNS	
	Martin Sulle	Tanzania	DNS	
