= 2017 European Athletics U23 Championships – Women's triple jump =

The women's triple jump event at the 2017 European Athletics U23 Championships was held in Bydgoszcz, Poland, at Zdzisław Krzyszkowiak Stadium on 13 and 14 July.

== Medalists ==
Gold	Elena Andreea Panțuroiu; Romania
Silver	Ana Peleteiro; Spain
Bronze	Rouguy Diallo; France

== Results ==
=== Qualification ===
13 July

Qualification rule: 13.05 (Q) or the 12 best results (q) qualified for the final.

Rank	Group	Name	Nationality	#1	#2	#3	Results	Notes
1	B	Yanis David	France	12.98w	12.97	13.75w	13.75w	Q
2	A	Elena Andreea Panțuroiu	Romania	13.69			13.69	Q
3	B	Rouguy Diallo	France	13.68			13.68	Q
4	A	Maeva Phesor	France	13.56			13.56	Q, PB
5	B	Ana Peleteiro	Spain	13.51			13.51	Q
6	A	Fatima Diame	Spain	13.44			13.44	Q
7	A	Evelise Veiga	Portugal	13.29			13.29	Q, PB
8	A	Ottavia Cestonaro	Italy	13.24			13.24	Q
9	A	Senni Salminen	Finland	12.54	13.12		13.12	Q
10	B	Diana Zagainova	Lithuania	13.10			13.10	Q
11	B	Jessie Maduka	Germany	13.09			13.09	Q
12	A	Paola Borović	Croatia	13.08			13.08	Q
13	B	Olha Korsun	Ukraine	12.95	13.01w	x	13.01w	
14	B	Eszter Bajnok	Hungary	12.95	x	x	12.95	
15	A	Zuzana Ďurkechová	Slovakia	12.83	12.86w	12.87	12.87	PB
16	A	Katerina Popova	Ukraine	12.48	12.59	12.82	12.82	
17	B	Ana Margarida Oliveira	Portugal	12.11	12.47	12.78	12.78	
18	A	Cemre Bitgin	Turkey	x	12.75	12.62	12.75	
19	A	Jasmine Al Omari	Italy	12.65	12.37	12.74	12.74	
20	B	Silvia La Tella	Italy	12.34	11.62	12.68	12.68	
21	B	Darya Dyachenko	Ukraine	12.49w	x	12.46w	12.49w	
22	B	Marija Stojadinović	Serbia	x	12.28	x	12.28	NU23R

=== Final ===
14 July

Rank	Name	Nationality	#1	#2	#3	#4	#5	#6	Result	Notes
1st place, gold medalist(s)	Elena Andreea Panțuroiu	Romania	13.78	14.04	14.01	14.27	13.91	14.08	14.27	
2nd place, silver medalist(s)	Ana Peleteiro	Spain	13.69	14.19	x	14.12	12.74	13.90	14.19	
3rd place, bronze medalist(s)	Rouguy Diallo	France	13.45	13.98	13.99w	13.76	13.60	x	13.99w	SB
4	Yanis David	France	13.41	x	13.48	x	13.39	13.78	13.78	=PB
5	Fatima Diame	Spain	13.13	13.28	13.60	x	13.39	12.27	13.60	
6	Ottavia Cestonaro	Italy	13.41	13.43	13.43	x	13.15	13.54	13.54	
7	Diana Zagainova	Lithuania	13.03	13.44	x	12.74	13.03	12.95	13.44	
8	Jessie Maduka	Germany	13.24	13.43	x	13.18	11.79	13.01	13.43	
9	Maeva Phesor	France	x	x	13.14				13.14	
10	Paola Borović	Croatia	x	13.14	13.04				13.14	
11	Senni Salminen	Finland	13.01	x	x				13.01	
12	Evelise Veiga	Portugal	12.34	12.56	13.00				13.00	
