= 2011 World Youth Championships in Athletics – Girls' 200 metres =

Girls' 200 metres at the 2011 World Youth Championships in Athletics
- Venue: Stadium Lille Métropole
- Dates: 8 July (heats); 9 July (semifinal); 10 July (final)
- Competitors: 56
- Winning time: 23.25 WYL

Medalists
gold medal	Desirèe Henry	Great Britain
silver medal	Christian Brennan	Canada
bronze medal	Shericka Jackson	Jamaica

The girls' 200 metres at the 2011 World Youth Championships in Athletics was held at the Stadium Lille Métropole on 8, 9 and 10 July.

== Medalists ==
Gold	Silver	Bronze
Desirèe Henry; Great Britain	Christian Brennan; Canada	Shericka Jackson; Jamaica

== Records ==
Prior to the competition, the following records were as follows.

World Youth Best	Marion Jones (USA)	22.58	New Orleans, United States	28 June 1992
Championship Record	Aymée Martínez (CUB)	22.99	Marrakesh, Morocco	17 July 2005
World Youth Leading	Shericka Jackson (JAM)	23.32	Montego Bay, Jamaica	24 April 2011

== Heats ==
Qualification rule: first 3 of each heat (Q) plus the 3 fastest times (q) qualified.

=== Heat 1 ===
Rank	Lane	Name	Nationality	Time	Notes
1	7	Karin Okolie	Bulgaria	24.74	Q
2	1	Kadecia Baird	Guyana	25.01	Q
3	6	Paula Solís	Argentina	25.61	Q
4	3	Sunanda Sarkar	India	25.98	
5	8	Eunice Kinyamasyo	Kenya	25.98	
	4	Celene Cevallos	Ecuador	DNF	
	2	Kyra Jefferson	United States	DNS	
	5	Tsitsi Mahachi	Zimbabwe	DNS	

=== Heat 2 ===
Rank	Lane	Name	Nationality	Time	Notes
1	6	Christian Brennan	Canada	24.02	Q
2	5	Tamiris de Liz	Brazil	24.65	Q
3	8	Gunta Latiševa-Čudare	Latvia	24.90	Q
4	2	Kedisha Dallas	United States	25.09	q
5	3	Archana Suseendran	India	25.58	
6	4	Evelin Nádházy	Hungary	25.64	
7	7	Nina Prudnikova	Kazakhstan	25.71	
8	1	Marthe Koala	Burkina Faso	25.80	PB

=== Heat 3 ===
Rank	Lane	Name	Nationality	Time	Notes
1	5	Florence Uwakwe	Nigeria	24.31	Q
2	2	Anna-Lena Freese	Germany	24.60	Q
3	3	Zhou Yanling	China	25.27	Q
4	6	Roxana Ene	Romania	25.36	
5	8	Rima Kashafutdinova	Kazakhstan	25.83	
6	7	Vanessa Waro	Papua New Guinea	26.00	SB
7	4	Frédérique Hansen	Luxembourg	26.21	SB
	1	Lucy Fortune	Grenada	DNS	

=== Heat 4 ===
Rank	Lane	Name	Nationality	Time	Notes
1	1	Bealoved Brown	United States	24.30	Q
2	7	Galina Nikolova	Bulgaria	24.52	Q
3	3	Ramona van der Vloot	Suriname	25.02	Q
4	6	Supawan Thipat	Thailand	25.25	
5	4	Anja Benko	Slovenia	25.84	
6	2	Mária Vavrová	Slovakia	26.02	
7	8	Hatice Öztürk	Turkey	26.37	
8	5	Banchayehu Tamene	Ethiopia	26.85	PB

=== Heat 5 ===
Rank	Lane	Name	Nationality	Time	Notes
1	7	Ekaterina Renzhina	Russia	24.19	Q
2	6	Khamica Bingham	Canada	24.21	Q
3	8	Beatriz de Souza	Brazil	25.02	Q
4	2	Philippa van der Merwe	South Africa	25.14	
5	1	Glenda Davis	Costa Rica	25.48	
6	3	Ada Benjamin	Nigeria	25.50	
7	5	Dóróthea Jóhannesdóttir	Iceland	26.25	
8	4	Olga Eshmurodova	Tajikistan	26.37	PB

=== Heat 6 ===
Rank	Lane	Name	Nationality	Time	Notes
1	1	Shericka Jackson	Jamaica	24.08	Q
1	2	Monica Brennan	Australia	24.08	Q
3	4	Anna Hämäläinen	Finland	24.56	Q
4	6	Masumi Aoki	Japan	24.87	q, PB
5	8	Diāna Daktere	Latvia	25.41	
6	5	Shenique Frett	British Virgin Islands	25.52	
7	7	Noah Herbert	Saint Kitts and Nevis	26.06	
8	3	Samia Nabli	Tunisia	27.26	PB

=== Heat 7 ===
Rank	Lane	Name	Nationality	Time	Notes
1	4	Desirèe Henry	Great Britain	23.57	Q, PB
2	5	Carmiesha Cox	Bahamas	24.25	Q
3	2	Loungo Matlhaku	Botswana	24.82	Q, SB
4	3	Marie Gisèle Eleme Asse	Cameroon	25.02	q, PB
5	7	Oksana Ralko	Ukraine	25.12	PB
6	6	Matilde Álvarez	Mexico	25.37	
7	8	Lidiane Lopes	Cape Verde	26.69	PB
	1	Stella Akakpo	France	DNS	

== Semifinals ==
Qualification rule: first 2 of each heat (Q) plus the 2 fastest times (q) qualified.

=== Heat 1 ===
Rank	Lane	Name	Nationality	Time	Notes
1	5	Shericka Jackson	Jamaica	23.65	Q
2	6	Monica Brennan	Australia	23.78	Q, PB
3	4	Khamica Bingham	Canada	23.89	PB
4	3	Carmiesha Cox	Bahamas	23.99	
5	7	Anna Hämäläinen	Finland	24.13	
6	2	Masumi Aoki	Japan	24.64	PB
7	8	Loungo Matlhaku	Botswana	24.71	SB
8	1	Paula Solís	Argentina	25.61	

=== Heat 2 ===
Rank	Lane	Name	Nationality	Time	Notes
1	4	Christian Brennan	Canada	23.48	Q, PB
2	3	Anna-Lena Freese	Germany	23.84	Q
3	5	Ekaterina Renzhina	Russia	23.96	
4	7	Gunta Latiševa-Čudare	Latvia	24.39	PB
5	8	Kadecia Baird	Guyana	24.53	PB
6	6	Karin Okolie	Bulgaria	24.59	
7	1	Beatriz de Souza	Brazil	24.90	
	2	Marie Gisèle Eleme Asse	Cameroon	DNS	

=== Heat 3 ===
Rank	Lane	Name	Nationality	Time	Notes
1	6	Desirèe Henry	Great Britain	23.38	Q, PB
2	5	Galina Nikolova	Bulgaria	23.70	Q, PB
3	3	Florence Uwakwe	Nigeria	23.73	q
4	4	Bealoved Brown	United States	23.80	q, PB
5	8	Tamiris de Liz	Brazil	24.25	
6	7	Ramona van der Vloot	Suriname	24.38	
7	1	Kedisha Dallas	United States	24.72	
8	2	Zhou Yanling	China	24.76	

== Final ==
Rank	Lane	Name	Nationality	Time	Notes
1st place, gold medalist(s)	3	Desirèe Henry	Great Britain	23.25	WYL
2nd place, silver medalist(s)	5	Christian Brennan	Canada	23.47	PB
3rd place, bronze medalist(s)	4	Shericka Jackson	Jamaica	23.62	
4	6	Galina Nikolova	Bulgaria	23.64	PB
5	2	Florence Uwakwe	Nigeria	23.67	
6	8	Anna-Lena Freese	Germany	23.91	
7	7	Monica Brennan	Australia	24.05	
8	1	Bealoved Brown	United States	24.08	
