= Javier Guerra (runner) =

Spanish long-distance runner

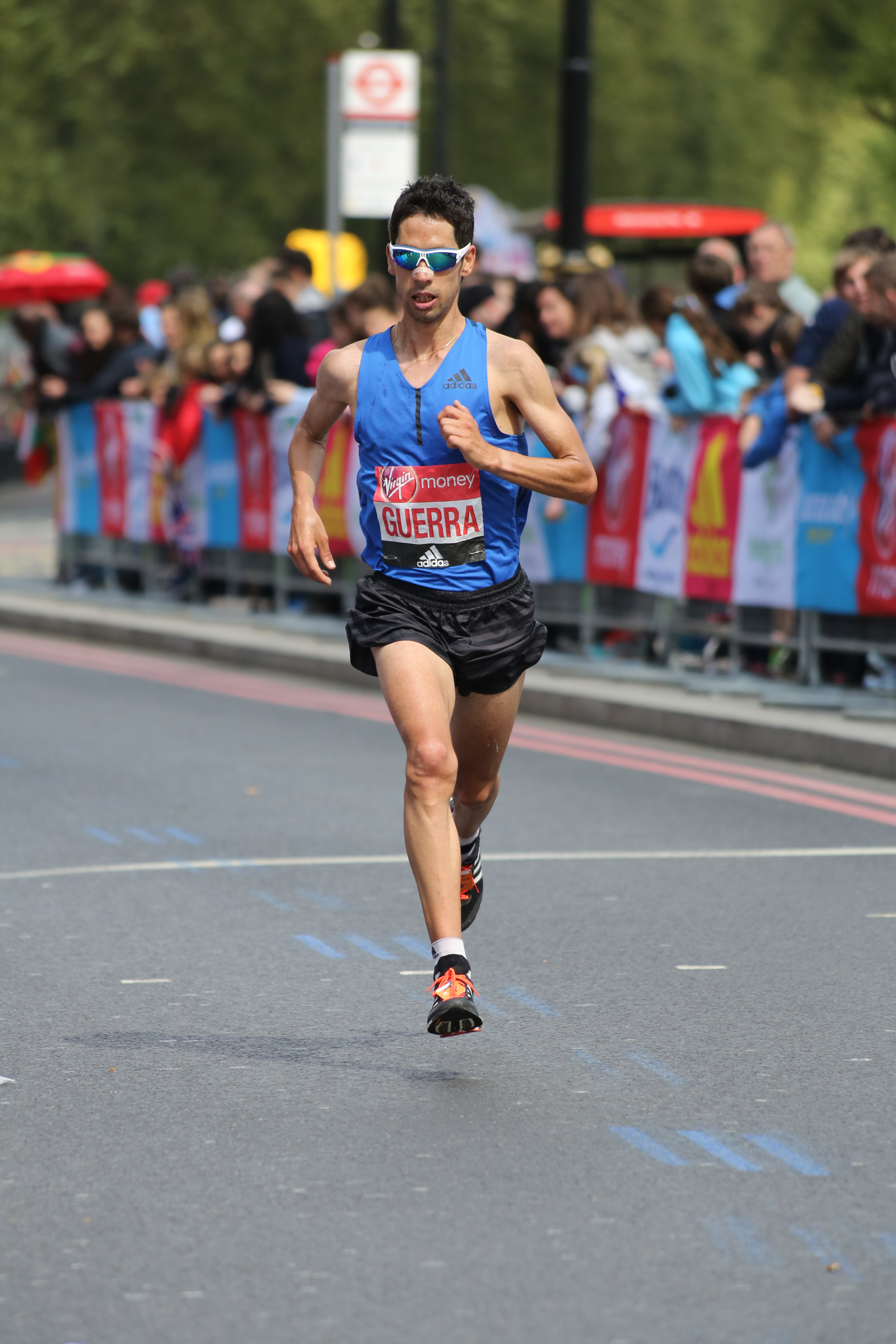
- Guerra at the 2017 London Marathon

Personal information
- Full name: Javier Guerra Polo
- Nationality: Spanish
- Born: 10 November 1983 (age 42) Segovia, Castille and Leon, Spain
- Height: 1.73 m (5 ft 8 in)
- Weight: 56 kg (123 lb)

Sport
- Country: Spain
- Sport: Track and field
- Event: long distance running
- Updated on 29 August 2015

Javier Guerra Polo (born 10 November 1983) is a male Spanish long distance runner. He finished 7th in the 2015 London Marathon, and 9th in the 2017 London Marathon.

== Competition record ==
Year	Competition	Venue	Position	Event	Notes
Representing Spain
2002	World Junior Championships	Kingston, Jamaica	15th	5000 m	14:55
2005	World Cross Country Championships	Saint-Galmier, France	–	12 km cross	DNF
2007	Universiade	Bangkok, Thailand	12th	5000 m	14:24
2008	Ibero-American Championships	Iquique, Chile	5th	5000 m	13:52
2009	Universiade	Belgrade, Serbia	7th	5000 m	14:11
2010	World Cross Country Championships	Bydgoszcz, Poland	79th	12 km cross	35:57
2013	World Championships	Moscow, Russia	15th	Marathon	2:14:33
2014	World Half Marathon Championships	Copenhagen, Denmark	38th	Half Marathon	1:02:27
2014	European Championships	Zürich, Switzerland	4th	Marathon	2:12:32
2015	World Championships	Beijing, China	13th	Marathon	2:17:00
2017	World Championships	London, United Kingdom	17th	Marathon	2:15.22
2018	Mediterranean Games	Tarragona, Spain	8th	Half marathon	1:05:19
2018	European Championships	Berlin, Germany	4th	Marathon	2:12:22
2021	Olympic Games	Sapporo, Japan	33rd	Marathon	2:16:42
2024	European Championships	Rome, Italy	24th	Half marathon	1:03:17
2025	European Running Championships	Leuven, Belgium	9th	Half marathon	1:02:31
