= Athletics at the 2019 Summer Universiade – Women's long jump =

The women's long jump event at the 2019 Summer Universiade was held on 8 and 9 July at the Stadio San Paolo in Naples.

== Medalists ==
Gold	Silver	Bronze
Maryna Bekh-Romanchuk; Ukraine	Evelise Veiga; Portugal	Florentina Iusco; Romania

== Results ==
=== Qualification ===
Qualification: 6.50 m (Q) or at least 12 best (q) qualified for the final.

Rank	Group	Name	Nationality	#1	#2	#3	Result	Notes
1	A	Florentina Iusco	Romania	6.54			6.54	Q
2	B	Maryna Bekh-Romanchuk	Ukraine	6.49	6.45	–	6.49	q
3	B	Evelise Veiga	Portugal	6.36	6.19	x	6.36	q
4	A	Jessie Harper	Australia	6.21	6.31	–	6.31	q
5	A	Susana Hernández	Mexico	6.16	6.29	6.30	6.30	q
6	B	Rougui Sow	France	6.17	6.30	x	6.30	q
7	B	Elizabeth Hedding	Australia	6.05	6.00	6.29	6.29	q
8	B	Tyra Gittens	Trinidad and Tobago	6.11	6.14	6.28	6.28	q
9	A	Marthe Koala	Burkina Faso	x	6.21	6.27	6.27	q
10	A	Ayaka Kora	Japan	5.89	6.01	6.22	6.22	q
11	A	Yue Ya Xin	Hong Kong	6.21	5.99	6.14	6.21	q
12	A	Filippa Fotopoulou	Cyprus	6.09	6.13	5.88	6.13	q
13	B	Neja Filipič	Slovenia	5.70	x	6.11	6.11	
14	B	Anna Keefer	United States	6.10	5.79	5.97	6.10	
15	A	Anastasiia Cheremisina	Ukraine	6.10	x	5.72	6.10	
16	B	Anna Křížková	Czech Republic	5.83	5.72	6.05	6.05	
17	B	Eljone Kruger	South Africa	5.75	5.76	6.04	6.04	
18	A	Anne-Mari Lehtio	Finland	5.78	x	6.02	6.02	
19	A	Lee Hui-jin	South Korea	5.98	5.71	5.88	5.98	
20	A	Zinzi Chabangu	South Africa	x	x	5.97	5.97	
21	B	Jogailė Petrokaitė	Lithuania	5.91	5.94	x	5.94	
22	B	Elin Larsson	Sweden	3.78	5.77	5.88	5.88	
23	B	Priyanka Kerketta	India	x	x	5.88	5.88	
24	A	Latifa Ali	Ghana	5.78	5.62	5.23	5.78	
25	A	María Trinidad Hurtado	Chile	5.76	5.53	5.68	5.76	
26	B	Riccarda Dietsche	Switzerland	5.56	5.58	5.62	5.62	
27	A	Kaoutar Selmi	Algeria	5.61	x	5.42	5.61	
28	A	Fu Luna	China	5.56	5.52	–	5.56	
29	B	Afaf Ben Hadja	Algeria	5.46	5.42	5.48	5.48	
30	B	Herath Ekanayaka Mudiyanselage	Sri Lanka	5.23	5.20	5.29	5.29	
31	B	Sou I Man	Macau	4.69	5.04	x	5.04	
32	B	Uliana Busila	Moldova	4.89	4.90	4.90	4.90	
33	A	Giulia Gasperoni	San Marino	4.79	4.76	4.82	4.82	
	A	Joy Bou Sleiman	Lebanon	x	x	x	NM	
	A	Nadia Mohd Zuki	Malaysia	x	x	x	NM	

=== Final ===
Official Video

Rank	Name	Nationality	#1	#2	#3	#4	#5	#6	Result	Notes
1st place, gold medalist(s)	Maryna Bekh-Romanchuk	Ukraine	x	6.54	x	6.66	6.79	6.84	6.84	
2nd place, silver medalist(s)	Evelise Veiga	Portugal	6.32	6.25	6.13	6.54	6.61	5.16	6.61	SB
3rd place, bronze medalist(s)	Florentina Iusco	Romania	x	x	6.55	6.43	6.53	3.44	6.55	
4	Susana Hernández	Mexico	6.04	x	6.27	6.33	6.37	6.28	6.37	
5	Tyra Gittens	Trinidad and Tobago	6.20	6.08	6.37	6.12	5.98	5.00	6.37	
6	Yue Ya Xin	Hong Kong	6.31	6.19	6.13	x	6.15	x	6.31	NR
7	Jessie Harper	Australia	6.19	6.15	6.30	6.25	6.24	6.27	6.30	
8	Elizabeth Hedding	Australia	4.50	6.08	6.29	6.13	x	6.19	6.29	
9	Marthe Koala	Burkina Faso	x	6.25	6.10				6.25	
10	Rougui Sow	France	6.17	6.21	6.20				6.21	
11	Filippa Fotopoulou	Cyprus	5.89	6.17	6.00				6.17	
12	Ayaka Kora	Japan	6.10	6.04	5.97				6.10	
