= Indunil Herath =

Sri Lankan middle-distance runner

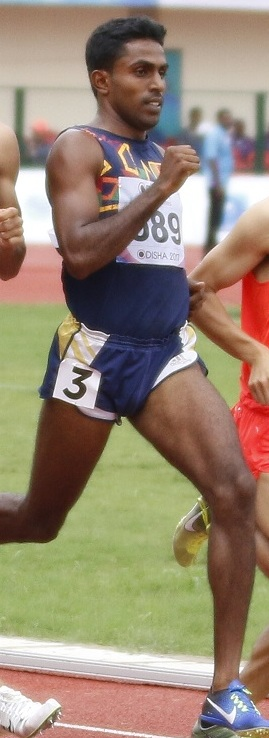
- Herath in 2017

Personal information
- Full name: Ekanayake Mudiyaselage Indunil Madushan Herath
- Born: 27 March 1993 (age 33) Mahiyanganaya, Sri Lanka

Sport
- Sport: Athletics
- Event: 800 metres
- Club: Sri Lanka Army
Medal record
Men's athletics
Representing Sri Lanka
South Asian Games
Gold medal – first place	2016 Guwahati	800 m
Gold medal – first place	2019 Kathmandu	800 m
Asian Indoor and Martial Arts Games
Silver medal – second place	2017 Ashgabat	800 m
Asian Junior Championships
Bronze medal – third place	2012 Colombo	4 × 400 m relay
Asian Youth Games
Bronze medal – third place	2009 Singapore	800 m

Ekanayake Mudiyaselage Idame Gedara Indunil Madushan Herath (born 27 March 1993) is a Sri Lankan middle-distance runner who specialises in the 800 metres. He won a silver medal at the 2017 Asian Indoor and Martial Arts Games.

In 2018, Herath broke the national record in the men's 800 m (with a time of 1:47.13) at the Kenyan President's Cup athletics.

== International competitions ==
Year	Competition	Venue	Position	Event	Notes
Representing Sri Lanka
2009	Asian Youth Games	Singapore	3rd	800 m	1:56.33
2010	Youth Olympic Games	Singapore	3rd (B)	1000 m	2:27.57
2012	Asian Junior Championships	Colombo, Sri Lanka	7th	400 m	48.82
2012	Asian Junior Championships	Colombo, Sri Lanka	5th	800 m	1:49.94
2012	Asian Junior Championships	Colombo, Sri Lanka	3rd	4 × 400 m relay	3:11.79
2014	Lusophony Games	Bambolin, India	4th	800 m	1:57.27
2014	Lusophony Games	Bambolin, India	4th	4 × 400 m relay	3:19.02
2015	Asian Championships	Wuhan, China	5th	800 m	1:51.51
2016	South Asian Games	Guwahati, India	1st	800 m	1:51.46
2016	Asian Indoor Championships	Doha, Qatar	8th	800 m	1:57.26
2017	Asian Championships	Bhubaneswar, India	5th	800 m	1:50.57
2017	Asian Indoor and Martial Arts Games	Ashgabat, Turkmenistan	2nd	800 m	1:49.45
2018	Asian Games	Jakarta, Indonesia	8th	800 m	1:51.36
2019	South Asian Games	Kathmandu, Nepal	1st	800 m	1:50.52

== Personal bests ==
Outdoor

- 400 metres – 48.30 (Colombo 2014)
- 800 metres – 1:47.13 (Kenya 2018)

Indoor

- 800 metres – 1:49.45 (Ashgabat 2017)
