= Macau at the 2023 World Athletics Championships =

- Flag of Macau
- WA code: MAC

in Budapest, Hungary 19 August 2023 – 27 August 2023
- Competitors: 1 (1 man and 0 women)
- Medals: Gold 0 Silver 0 Bronze 0 Total 0

World Athletics Championships appearances
- 2001; 2003; 2005; 2007; 2009; 2011; 2013; 2015; 2017; 2019; 2022; 2023; 2025

Macau competed at the 2023 World Athletics Championships in Budapest, Hungary, which were held from 19 to 27 August 2023. The athlete delegation of the nation was composed of one competitor, sprinter Kin Wa Chan who competed in the men's 100 metres. He qualified for the Championships upon being selected by Associaçao de Atletismo de Macau. In the preliminary round, he placed third in his round and advanced to the first round heats. In the heats, he placed last in his heat and did not advance further.

== Background ==
The 2023 World Athletics Championships in Budapest, Hungary, were held from 19 to 27 August 2023. The Championships were held at the National Athletics Centre. To qualify for the World Championships, athletes had to reach an entry standard (e.g. time or distance), place in a specific position at select competitions, be a wild card entry, or qualify through their World Athletics Ranking at the end of the qualification period.

As Macau did not meet any of the four standards, they could send either one male or one female athlete in one event of the Championships who has not yet qualified. The Associaçao de Atletismo de Macau selected sprinter Kin Wa Chan, who would compete in the men's 100 metres. In the entry list for the Championships, he held a personal and season's best of 10.62 seconds in the event. Previously, Chan represented Macau at the 2023 Asian Athletics Championships held in Bangkok, Thailand.

== Results ==
Key

- Q = Qualified for the next round
- q = Qualified for the next round as a fastest loser or, in field events, by position without achieving the qualifying target
- NR = National record
- PB = Personal best
- SB = Season best
- N/A = Round not applicable for the event

=== Men ===
Chan first competed in the first preliminary round heat of the men's 100 metres on 19 August against six other sprinters. There, he recorded a time of 10.79 seconds and placed third heat, advancing further to the first round heats as he was of the two next fastest sprinters outside of the top two of their heats. He then competed in the second heat of the first round in the same day against seven other sprinters. There, he recorded a time of 10.83 seconds and placed last, failing to advance further as he was not within the top three of his heat nor was he one of the three next fastest athletes.

Track and road events

Athlete	Event	Preliminary		Heat		Semifinal		Final	
Athlete	Event	Result	Rank	Result	Rank	Result	Rank	Result	Rank
Kin Wa Chan	100 metres	10.79	3 q	10.83	8	Did not advance			
