= Guinea-Bissau at the 2019 World Athletics Championships =

Guinea-Bissau at the 2019 World Championships in Athletics
- WA code: GBS

in Doha, Qatar
- Competitors: 1
- Medals: Gold 0 Silver 0 Bronze 0 Total 0

World Championships in Athletics appearances
- 1997; 1999; 2001; 2003; 2005; 2007; 2009; 2011; 2013; 2015; 2017; 2019; 2022; 2023; 2025

Guinea-Bissau competed at the 2019 World Championships in Athletics in Doha, Qatar, from 27 September to 6 October 2019.

== Results ==
(q – qualified, NM – no mark, SB – season best)

=== Men ===
Track and road events

Athlete	Event	Heat		Final	
Athlete	Event	Result	Rank	Result	Rank
Braima Suncar Dabó	5000 metres	18:10.74 PB	35	Did not advance	
