= Sílvia Cruz =

Portuguese javelin thrower (born 1980)

Personal information
- Full name: Sílvia Isabel Cruz
- Nationality: Portugal
- Born: 29 December 1980 (age 45) Lisbon, Portugal
- Height: 1.75 m (5 ft 9 in)
- Weight: 85 kg (187 lb)

Sport
- Sport: Athletics
- Event: Javelin throw

Achievements and titles
- Personal best: Javelin throw: 59.76 m (2008)

Sílvia Isabel Cruz (born 29 December 1980) is a Portuguese javelin thrower. She set both a national record and a personal best throw of 59.76 metres at the first league of the European Athletics Cup in Leiria.

Cruz represented Portugal at the 2008 Summer Olympics in Beijing, where she competed for the women's javelin throw. She performed the best throw of 57.06 metres, on her second attempt, finishing twenty-fourth overall in the qualifying rounds.

== Competition record ==
Year	Competition	Venue	Position	Event	Notes
Representing Portugal
1998	Ibero-American Championships	Lisbon, Portugal	6th	Javelin throw	42.64 m
1999	European Junior Championships	Riga, Latvia	15th (q)	Javelin throw	48.68 m
2001	European U23 Championships	Amsterdam, Netherlands	7th	Javelin throw	53.58 m
2004	Ibero-American Championships	Huelva, Spain	9th	Javelin throw	46.70 m
2007	World Championships	Osaka, Japan	15th (q)	Javelin throw	58.53 m
2008	Olympic Games	Beijing, China	24th (q)	Javelin throw	57.06 m
2010	Ibero-American Championships	San Fernando, Spain	2nd	Javelin throw	53.43 m
2014	Lusophony Games	Goa, India	1st	Shot put	13.25 m
