= 2002 World Junior Championships in Athletics – Men's 5000 metres =

The men's 5000 metres event at the 2002 World Junior Championships in Athletics was held in Kingston, Jamaica, at National Stadium on 16 July.

== Medalists ==
Gold	Hillary Chenonge; Kenya
Silver	Markos Geneti Guteta; Ethiopia
Bronze	Gebre-Egziabher Gebremariam; Ethiopia

== Results ==
=== Final ===
16 July

Rank	Name	Nationality	Time	Notes
1st place, gold medalist(s)	Hillary Chenonge	Kenya	13:28.30	
2nd place, silver medalist(s)	Markos Geneti Guteta	Ethiopia	13:28.83	
3rd place, bronze medalist(s)	Gebre-Egziabher Gebremariam	Ethiopia	13:29.13	
4	Solomon Bushendich	Kenya	13:36.97	
5	Pascal Ntahokaraja	Burundi	13:55.63	
6	Dieudonné Gahungu	Burundi	13:56.84	
7	Abdelhalim Zahraoui	Morocco	14:08.55	
8	Ahmed Khamlaoui	Tunisia	14:14.83	
9	Koichi Murakami	Japan	14:22.05	
10	Sandile Lembetha	South Africa	14:23.88	
11	Rod Koborsi	United States	14:24.91	
12	Hamid Ezzine	Morocco	14:28.68	
13	Noel Cutillas	Spain	14:37.83	
14	Shawn Forrest	Australia	14:41.15	
15	Javier Guerra	Spain	14:55.07	
16	Ali Hassan Bahdon	Djibouti	16:18.48	
17	Henry Foufaka	Solomon Islands	16:22.25	

== Participation ==
According to an unofficial count, 17 athletes from 12 countries participated in the event.

- Australia (1)
- Burundi (2)
- Djibouti (1)
- Ethiopia (2)
- Japan (1)
- Kenya (2)
- Morocco (2)
- Solomon Islands (1)
- South Africa (1)
- Spain (2)
- Tunisia (1)
- United States (1)
