= Euclides Varela =

Cape Verdean long-distance runner

Personal information
- Full name: Euclides Varela
- Nationality: Cape Verdean
- Born: April 6, 1982 (age 44)

Sport
- Country: Cape Verde
- Sport: Athletics
- Event: long-distances
- Updated on 3 January 2014

Euclides Varela (born 6 April 1982) is a Cape Verdean long-distance runner.

== Career ==
Varela first competed for Cape Verde at the 2003 IAAF World Indoor Championships in Birmingham where he placed 21st in heats of the 3000 metres in a time of 8:29.10. Seven months later at the 2003 All-Africa Games in Abuja, Nigeria, he finished 13th in the 5000 metres with a time of 14:53.83. In March 2004 at the World Indoor Championships in Budapest, Varela recorded his personal best time in the 3000 metres with an 8:19.17, a then national record. Five months at the 2004 Ibero-American Championships in Athletics in Huelva, Varela finished 9th in the 5000 metres with PB of 14:26.37. At the 2006 Lusophony Games in Macau, he completed in the half marathon which was won by his fellow countryman Nelson Cruz. Some four years later, at the 2010 Ibero-American Championships in San Fernando, Spain Varela place 10th in the 5000 metres in 15:29.61. At the 2010 edition of the São Silvestre da Amadora in Lisbon, Varela finished in 4th place in 10 km run recording a national record time of 29:27.

=== Personal bests ===
Below is Euclides Varela's personal-best times

Event	Time	Venue	Date	Records	Notes
3000 metres	8:24.23	Leiria, Portugal	4 June 2006		
3000 metres (indoor)	8:19.17	Budapest, Hungary	5 March 2004		
5000 metres	14:26.37	Huelva, Spain	6 August 2004		
10 km (road)	29:27	Lisbon, Portugal	31 December 2010	NR	
15 km (road)	46:38	Benavente, Portugal	15 January 2012		
Half marathon	1:04:29	Almeirim, Portugal	30 October 2011		
