= Athletics Federation of Guinea-Bissau =

Athletics and sports

- Federação de Atletismo da Guiné-Bissau
- Sport: Athletics
- Abbreviation: FAGB
- Founded: 1988
- Affiliation: IAAF
- Affiliation date: 1991
- Regional affiliation: CAA
- Headquarters: Bissau
- President: Renato Moura
- Secretary: Ukessano Lima
- (Guinea-Bissau)

The Athletics Federation of Guinea-Bissau (FAGB; Portuguese: Federação de Atletismo da Guiné-Bissau) is the governing body for the sport of athletics in Guinea-Bissau. The current president is Renato Moura.

== History ==
FAGB was founded in 1988, and was affiliated to the IAAF in the year 1991.

== Affiliations ==
- International Association of Athletics Federations (IAAF)
- Confederation of African Athletics (CAA)
- Asociación Iberoamericana de Atletismo (AIA; Ibero-American Athletics Association)

Moreover, it is part of the following national organisations:

- Guinea-Bissau Olympic Committee (Portuguese: Comité Olímpico da Guiné-Bissau)

== National records ==
FAGB maintains the national records.
