= Markos Geneti =

Ethiopian long-distance runner

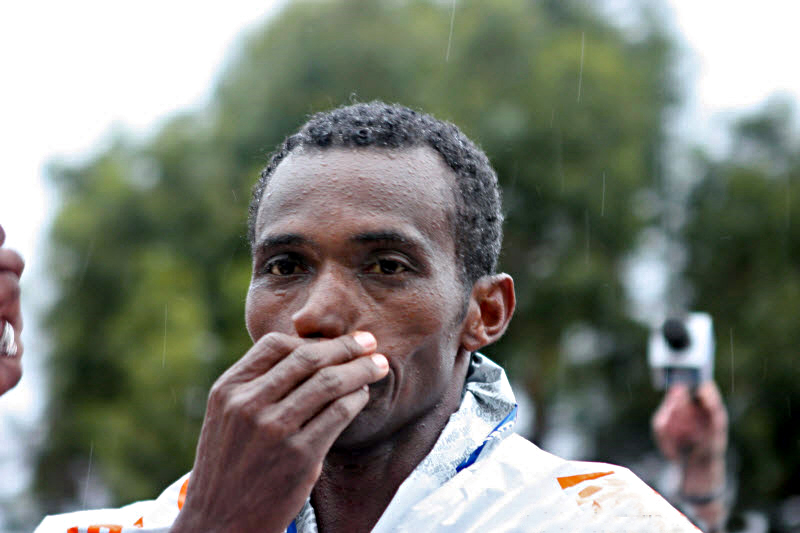
Markos Geneti at the 2011 Los Angeles Marathon

Markos Geneti (born 30 May 1984 in Gute, Oromia Region) is an Ethiopian long-distance runner who previously competed in track running, but now is a road specialist.

== Biography ==
He won the 3000 metres title at the 2001 World Youth Championships in Athletics and stepped up a level to take the silver medal over 5000 metres at the 2002 World Junior Championships in Athletics the following year. Turning to senior competition, he was the runner-up in the 5000 m behind Hailu Mekonnen at the 2003 Afro-Asian Games and went on to claim the bronze medal in the 3000 m at the 2004 IAAF World Indoor Championships. He competed in that event twice at the IAAF World Athletics Final, in 2004 and 2005, but failed to win a medal on either occasion.

He made his global outdoor debut at the 2005 World Championships in Athletics, where he reached the semi-finals of the 1500 metres. Geneti ran a 3000 m best of 7:32.69 minutes at the Birmingham Indoor Grand Prix in February 2007. The following month he then made his debut at the 2007 IAAF World Cross Country Championships, where his 15th-place finish was the second best performance by an Ethiopian (after Tadese Tola).

In March 2011, he won the Los Angeles Marathon, breaking the record by almost two minutes in his first marathon attempt. His time of 2:06:35 was at that point the sixth fastest ever for a first-time marathoner. In his second race at the 2012 Dubai Marathon he ran a personal best time of 2:04:54 hours, but in one of the fastest races ever, he took third place behind Ayele Abshero and Dino Sefir. He did not return to competition until December, when he ran at the Honolulu Marathon and placed second to Wilson Kipsang.

== Achievements ==
Year	Competition	Venue	Position	Event	Notes
Representing Ethiopia
2001	World Youth Championships	Debrecen, Hungary	1st	3000 m	7:55.82
2002	World Junior Championships	Kingston, Jamaica	2nd	5000 m	13:28.83
2003	Afro-Asian Games	Hyderabad, India	2nd	5000 m	13:49.61
2004	World Indoor Championships	Budapest, Hungary	3rd	3000 m	7:57.87
2004	World Athletics Final	Monte Carlo, Monaco	6th	3000 m	7:42.24
2005	World Championships	Helsinki, Finland	12th (semis)	1500 m	3:42.80
2005	World Athletics Final	Monte Carlo, Monaco	9th	3000 m	7:41.76
2007	World Cross Country Championships	Mombasa, Kenya	15th	Senior race (12 km)	37:49

=== Personal bests ===
- 1500 metres - 3:33.83 (2005)
- 3000 metres - 7:32.69 (2006, indoor)
- 5000 metres - 13:00.25 (2005)
- Marathon - 2:04:54 (2012)
