= Renato Moura =

Portuguese politician (1949–2024)

Renato Moura (1949 – 28 August 2024) was a Portuguese Azorean politician and civil servant. Moura served the Legislative Assembly of the Azores for its first four legislatures from 1976 until 1992. He also worked as the director of the As Flores newspaper for thirty-two years.

== Life and career ==
Moura was born in 1949 in Horta, Azores, on Faial Island, but he lived on Flores Island for his entire life. He headed the island's regional tax office in Santa Cruz das Flores.

He was elected to the Legislative Assembly of the Azores for four consecutive terms beginning with the 1976 Azorean regional election. Moura, who served from 1976 until 1992, was a member of the Social Democratic Party (PSD) for the majority of his tenure. However, he left PSD in 1991 and served the remaining year and a half of his final term as a political independent from 29 May 1991 until he left office on 1 November 1992.

Moura chaired the Municipal Assembly of Santa Cruz das Flores and headed the Administrative Commission of the Federation of Municipalities of the Island of Flores. He also represented the Azores at the Luso-French Commission.

He later became Vice President of the Azorean chapter of the CDS – People's Party (CDS–PP) and served as president of the CDS–PP's Azorean Regional Directive Committee.

Moura died on 28 August 2024, at the age of 75.
