= Leong Wang Kuong =

Macau sprinter (born 1990)

Personal information
- Born: 18 March 1990 (age 36)

Chinese name
- Chinese: 梁宏光
- Hanyu Pinyin: Liáng Hóngguāng
- Yale Romanization: Lèuhng Wàhnggwõng
- Jyutping: Loeng4 Wang4-gwong1

Sport
- Country: Macau
- Sport: Track and field
- Event: sprinter
Medal record
Lusophony Games
Bronze medal – third place	2014 Lusophony Games	4 × 100 m
- Updated on 29 August 2015

Leong Wang Kuong (born 18 March 1990) is a male Macau sprinter. He competed in the 100 metres event at the 2015 World Championships in Athletics in Beijing, China.

At the 2014 Lusofonia Games, Leong won a bronze medal in the 4 × 100 m relay.

== See also ==
- Macau at the 2015 World Championships in Athletics
