= Ruben Sança =

Cape Verdean long-distance runner

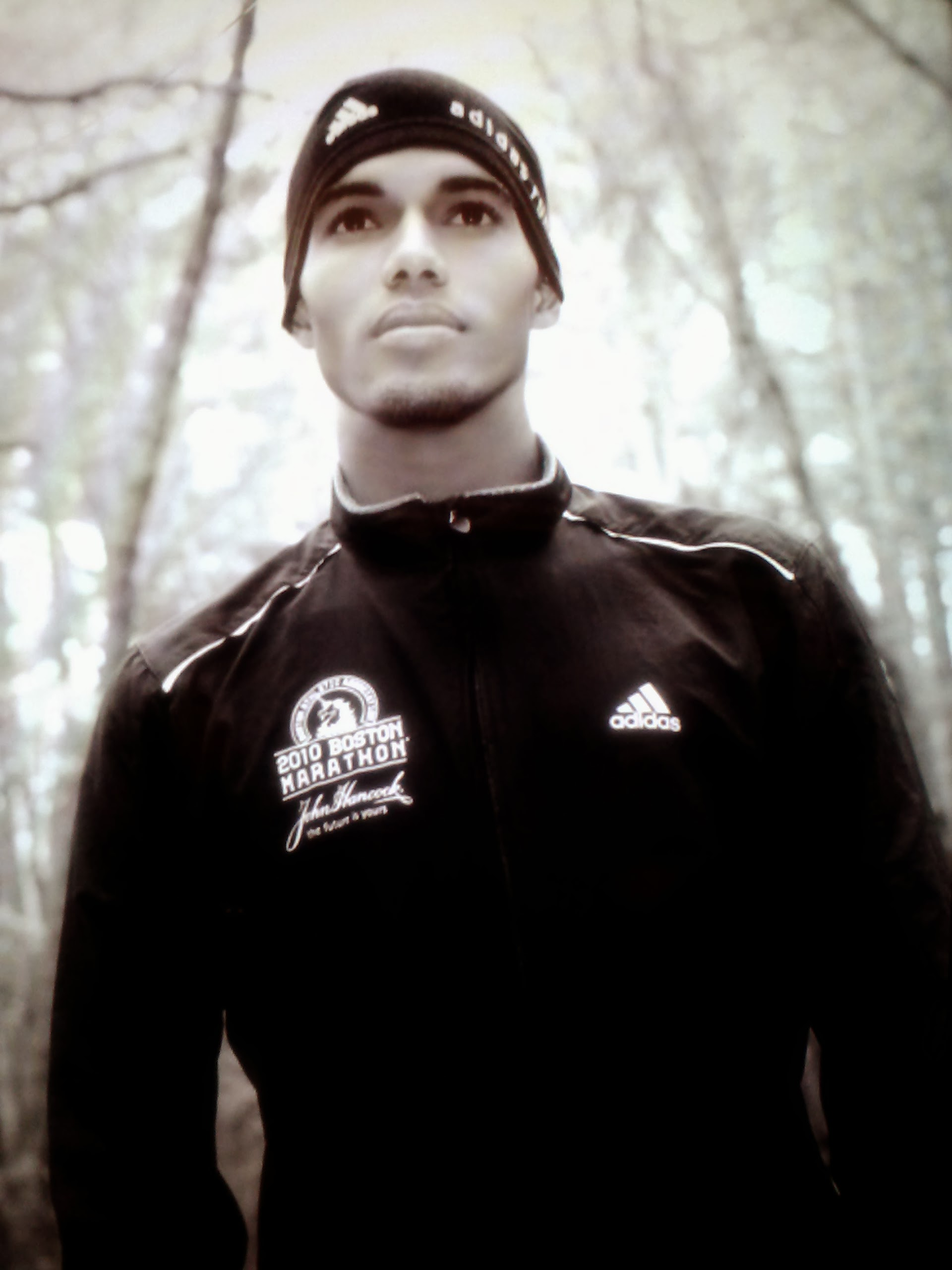
- Sança in 2014

Personal information
- Full name: Ruben Sança
- Nationality: Cape Verdean
- Born: December 13, 1986 (age 39) Santa Maria, Cape Verde
- Height: 188 cm (6 ft 2 in)
- Weight: 70 kg (154 lb)

Sport
- Sport: Track, Long-distance running
- Events: 1500 meters, 5000 meters, Marathon
- College team: Umass Lowell
- Club: Whirlaway Racing Team

Achievements and titles
- Personal bests: 1500 meters: 3:49.17; 10,000 meters: 29:49.48; Half Marathon: 1:05:24; Marathon: 2:18:47
Medal record
Men's athletics
Representing Cape Verde
Lusophony Games
Gold medal – first place	2014 Lusophony Games	5000 m

Ruben Pascal Sança (born December 13, 1986) is a Cape Verdean long-distance runner who specializes in the marathon. He attended and ran for the University of Massachusetts Lowell, after which he began training under Gary Gardner as a member of the Whirlaway Racing Team. Sança is the current Cape Verdean record-holder at 3,000 m indoors at 8:07.50, the 5000 m indoors at 13:56.46, the 5000 m outdoors at 14:05.39, road 5 km at 14:11 and the marathon at 2:18:47. He was one of three members of the 2012 Cape Verdean Olympic team.

== Running career ==
At the 2012 Summer Olympics, he competed in the men's 5000 metres, finishing 40th overall in Round 1, failing to qualify for the final. Soon after the London Olympics, he underwent knee surgery to remove a benign tumor in his right knee, which had affected him throughout the Olympics. He returned to the marathon on April 21, 2014, finishing in 21st place with a time of 2:19:05 at the 2014 Boston Marathon.

== Major competition record ==
Year	Competition	Venue	Position	Event	Notes
Representing Cape Verde
2009	Lusophony Games	Lisbon, Portugal	6th	1500 m	3:55.10
2011	New Bedford Half Marathon	New Bedford, United States	1st	Half Marathon	1:05:24
2011	Rotterdam Marathon	Rotterdam, Netherlands	17th	Marathon	2:18:47
2011	World Championship	Daegu, South Korea	48th	Marathon	2:34:40
2011	Rock 'n' Roll Las Vegas Marathon	Las Vegas, United States	16th	Half Marathon	1:07:14
2012	Olympic Games	London, England	40th	5000 m	14:35.19
2014	Lusophony Games	Goa, India	1st	5000 m	14:28.48
2014	New Bedford Half Marathon	New Bedford, United States	1st	Half Marathon	1:05:52
2014	Boston Marathon	Boston, United States	20th	Marathon	2:19:05
2014	Twin Cities Marathon	Minneapolis, United States	DNF	Marathon	Injury at 25 km
2014	Macau Half Marathon	Macau, China	2nd	Half Marathon	1:08:19
2015	Boston Marathon	Boston, United States	24th	Marathon	2:21:58
2015	BAA Half Marathon	Boston, United States	8th	Half Marathon	1:09:51
2015	Valencia Marathon	Valencia, Spain	DNF	Marathon	Injury at 30 km
2016	Jacksonville Half Marathon	Jacksonville, United States	37th	Half Marathon	1:06:25
2016	London Marathon	London, England	32nd	Marathon	2:21:35
2016	Great North Run	South Shields, England	12th	Half Marathon	1:05:53
2016	Macau Half Marathon	Macau, China	3rd	Half Marathon	1:08:42
2017	New Bedford Half Marathon	New Bedford, United States	2nd	Half Marathon	1:06:54
2017	Bangkok Midnight Marathon	Bangkok, Thailand	3rd	Marathon	2:53:17
2017	Baystate Marathon	Lowell, United States	2nd	Marathon	2:24:15
2018	New Bedford Half Marathon	New Bedford, United States	4th	Half Marathon	1:07:43
2018	O'Djo D'Agua Half Marathon	Santa Maria, Cape Verde	1st	Half Marathon	1:10:52
2018	Boston Marathon	Boston, United States	DNF	Marathon	Hypothermia at 30 km
2018	Berlin Marathon	Berlin, Germany	29th	Marathon	2:21:01

== Personal bests ==
Distance	Time (min)	Date	Location
1500 m	3:49.17	5 May 2012	Waltham
Mile run (indoors)	4:07.37	12 February 2009	Boston
3000 m (indoors)	8:07.50 (NR)	29 January 2011	Boston
5000 m	14:05.39 (NR)	16 April 2012	Walnut
5000 m (indoors)	13:56.46 (NR)	30 January 2010	Boston
5 km (road)	14:11 (NR)	25 February 2010	Armagh
10 km (road)	29:54	25 August 2013	Brockton
Half Marathon	1:05:24	20 March 2011	New Bedford
Marathon	2:18:47 (NR)	10 April 2011	Rotterdam
