= Evelise Veiga =

Portuguese athlete

Personal information
- Full name: Evelise Maria Tavares da Veiga
- Citizenship: Cape Verde
- Born: 3 March 1996 (age 30) Santiago, Cape Verde

Sport
- Country: Portugal
- Sport: Women's athletics
- University team: Polytechnic Institute of Leiria
- Club: Sporting CP
- Coached by: Cátia Ferreira

Achievements and titles
- Personal best(s): Triple jump (outdoor): 14.32 m (46 ft 11 3/4 in); Triple jump (indoor): 13.68 m (44 ft 10 1/2 in); Long jump (outdoor): 6.82 m (22 ft 4 1/2 in); Long jump (indoor): 6.48 m (21 ft 3 in)
Medal record
Representing Portugal
Women's long jump
European Team Championships
Silver medal – second place	2017 Vaasa (FL)	Long jump
Silver medal – second place	2019 Sandnes (FL)	Long jump
Bronze medal – third place	2017 Sandnes (FL)	Triple jump
Mediterranean Games
Bronze medal – third place	2022 Oran	Long jump
Lusophony Games
Gold medal – first place	2014 Goa	Long jump
Universiade
Silver medal – second place	2019 Naples	Triple jump
Silver medal – second place	2019 Naples	Long jump
Mediterranean U23 Championships
Gold medal – first place	2018 Jesolo	Long jump
Silver medal – second place	2018 Jesolo	Triple jump

Evelise Maria Tavares da Veiga (born 3 March 1996) is a Portuguese long jumper who also competes in triple jump events. She won two silver medals at the 2019 Summer Universiade in Naples, Italy.

== International competitions ==
Year	Competition	Venue	Position	Event	Notes
Representing Portugal
2013	World Youth Championships	Donetsk, Ukraine	23rd (q)	Long jump	5.63 m
2014	Lusophony Games	Goa, India	1st	Long jump	5.86 m
2015	European Junior Championships	Eskilstuna, Sweden	9th	Long jump	6.02 m (w)
2015	European Junior Championships	Eskilstuna, Sweden	10th	Triple jump	12.61 m
2017	European U23 Championships	Bydgoszcz, Poland	5th	Long jump	6.43 m
2017	European U23 Championships	Bydgoszcz, Poland	12th	Triple jump	13.00 m
2018	Mediterranean U23 Championships	Jesolo, Italy	1st	Long jump	6.26 m
2018	Mediterranean Games	Tarragona, Spain	5th	Long jump	6.61 m
2018	European Championships	Berlin, Germany	8th	Long jump	6.47 m
2019	Universiade	Naples, Italy	2nd	Long jump	6.61 m
2019	Universiade	Naples, Italy	2nd	Triple jump	13.81 m
2019	World Championships	Doha, Qatar	18th (q)	Triple jump	13.89 m
2021	Olympic Games	Tokyo, Japan	19th (q)	Triple jump	13.93 m
2022	Ibero-American Championships	La Nucía, Spain	2nd	Long jump	6.55 m (w)
2022	Ibero-American Championships	La Nucía, Spain	5th	Triple jump	13.50 m
2022	Mediterranean Games	Oran, Algeria	3rd	Long jump	6.54 m
2022	Mediterranean Games	Oran, Algeria	6th	Triple jump	13.31 m
2022	World Championships	Eugene, United States	15th (q)	Long jump	6.54 m
2022	European Championships	Munich, Germany	19th (q)	Long jump	6.17 m
2023	European Indoor Championships	Istanbul, Turkey	8th	Long jump	6.36 m
2024	European Championships	Rome, Italy	–	Long jump	NM
