= Eva Pereira =

Cape Verdean middle-distance runner

Personal information
- Full name: Eva Sanches Pereira
- Nationality: Cape Verdean
- Born: March 22, 1989 (age 37)

Sport
- Country: Cape Verde
- Sport: Athletics
- Event: Middle-distance running
- Updated on 3 January 2014

Eva Sanches Pereira (born 22 March 1989) is a Cape Verdean middle-distance runner.

Pereira first competed for Cape Verde at the 2005 World Youth Championships in Athletics in Marrakesh, Morocco where she placed 15th in the Girls' 3000 metres in a personal best time of 11:53.24. Two years later at the 2009 Lusophony Games in Lisbon, Portugal she placed 6th in the 10,000 metres with a time of 44:56. The following month she ran the 1500 metres in 5:04.95 at the 2009 World Championships in Athletics in Berlin.

== Personal bests ==
Below are Eva Pereira's personal best times.

Event	Time	Venue	Date	Records	Notes
1500 metres	5:04.95	Berlin, Germany	18 August 2009		
3000 metres	11:53.24	Marrakesh, Morocco	13 July 2005		
