= Maurício Alves =

Brazilian footballer

Personal information
- Full name: Maurício Alves Peruchi
- Date of birth: 2 January 1990
- Place of birth: Montanha, Brazil
- Date of death: 12 April 2014 (aged 24)
- Height: 1.80 m (5 ft 11 in)
- Position: Striker

Youth career
- Fluminense
- Villarreal

Senior career*
Years	Team	Apps	(Gls)
2007	Fluminense	20	(0)
2009–2010	Villarreal C	26	(4)
2010–2012	Villarreal B	5	(0)
2011	→ Avaí (loan)	9	(1)
2012–2014	Boulogne	42	(8)
Total		102	(13)
- * Club domestic league appearances and goals

Maurício Alves Peruchi or simply Maurício (2 January 1990 – 12 April 2014), was a Brazilian football striker. He started his career in Fluminense FC and last played for US Boulogne in Championnat National.

He was signed by Villarreal CF from Fluminense FC for €700,000.

== Death ==
Alves Peruchi was killed on 12 April 2014 in a traffic collision at the age of 24, where his friend and teammate Alexis Sauvage was the driver.
