= List of Cape Verdean records in athletics =

The following are the national records in athletics in Cape Verde maintained by Cape Verde's national athletics federation: Federação Caboverdiana de Atletismo (FCA).

== Outdoor ==
Key to tables: Awaiting ratification Record not kept by FCA Not ratified or later rescinded by FCA

=== Men ===
Event	Record	Athlete	Date	Meet	Place	Ref.
100 m	10.69 (−0.5 m/s) (Semifinal)	Ronaldinho Oliveira	3 June 2023	Trofeo de Atletismo Ciudad de Salamanca Memorial Carlos Gil Perez	Salamanca, Spain	
100 m	10.69 (+1.6 m/s) (Final)	Ronaldinho Oliveira	3 June 2023	Trofeo de Atletismo Ciudad de Salamanca Memorial Carlos Gil Perez	Salamanca, Spain	
100 m	10.2 h	Eskilson Nascimento	13 May 2017	CAA Region 2 African Championships	Conakry, Guinea	
100 m	10.4 h	Eskilson Nascimento	13 May 2017	CAA Region 2 African Championships	Conakry, Guinea	
200 m	21.65 (−2.2 m/s)	Eskilson Nascimento	26 July 2017	Jeux de la Francophonie	Abidjan, Ivory Coast	
200 m	21.5 (Note: 21.74 by other sources) h (+0.7 m/s)	Ronaldinho Oliveira	1 July 2015		Lisbon, Portugal	
400 m	47.96	Salvador Lopes Goncalves	10 September 2000		Esch-sur-Alzette Luxembourg	
800 m	1:49.94	Samuel Freire	17 June 2017		Lisbon, Portugal	
1500 m	3:45.94	Samuel Freire	24 June 2017		Bilbao, Spain	
3000 m	8:07.40	Samuel Freire (Note: undefined citizenship, per World Athletics profile Freire starts for Portugal)	1 June 2019		Lisbon, Portugal	
Two miles	8:56.53	Ruben Sança	10 April 2010	George Davis Invitational	Lowell, United States	
5000 m	14:05.39	Ruben Sança	16 April 2010 (Note: by World Athletics sources; 15 April 2010 by other sources)	Mt. SAC Relays	Walnut, United States	
5 km (road)	14:10.35	Ruben Sança	27 February 2010	Armagh International Road Race	Armagh, United Kingdom	
10,000 m	29:09.51	Nelson Cruz	28 June 2008		Lisbon, Portugal	
10 km (road)	28:54	Sérgio Dias	10 December 2016	Grande Prémio de Natal	Lisbon, Portugal	
15 km (road)	45:33	Nelson Cruz	15 January 2012	Portuguese 15k Road Running Championships	Benavente, Portugal	
Half marathon	1:04:16	Nelson Cruz	27 July 2008		Pombal, Portugal	
Marathon	2:18:47	Ruben Sança	10 April 2011	Rotterdam Marathon	Rotterdam, Netherlands	
Marathon	2:17:39 (Note: downhill)	Nelson Cruz	16 April 2006		Lisbon, Portugal	
110 m hurdles	13.78	Henry Andrade	11 May 1996		Modesto, United States	
400 m hurdles	49.26	Jordin Andrade	11 June 2016	Jamaica National Racer's Grand Prix	Kingston, Jamaica	
3000 m steeplechase	9:42.80	António Zeferino	25 June 1995		Maia, Portugal	
High jump	2.05 m	Stephane Varela	11 January 2014		Lisbon, Portugal	
Pole vault	4.60 m	José Rosa	26 June 2010		Lisbon, Portugal	
Long jump	7.57 m	Nelson Évora	25 May 2002		Lisbon, Portugal	
Triple jump	16.15 m (−0.2 m/s)	Nelson Évora	10 June 2001		Braga, Portugal	
Shot put	11.96 m	José Rosa	7 May 2011		Rio Maior, Portugal	
Discus throw	40.64 m	José Rosa	12 June 2011		Luso, Portugal	
Hammer throw	34.10 m	Roque Semedo	23 January 2016		Funchal, Portugal	
Javelin throw	62.35 m	Egner Tavares	25 June 2013		Lumiar, Portugal	
Decathlon	6101 pts	José Rosa	11–12 June 2011		Luso, Portugal	
Decathlon	100m / Long jump / Shot put / High jump / 400m / 110m H / Discus / Pole vault / Javelin / 1500m; 11.25 / 5.93 m / 11.77 m / 1.84 m / 56.16 m / 16.76 / 40.64 m / 4.00 m / 49.01 m / 5:29.77					
20 km walk (road)	1:57:45	Nílson Tavares	14 September 2011		Maputo, Mozambique	
50 km walk (road)						
4 × 100 m relay	41.7 h	Cape Verde; B. Carvalho; R. Gonçalves; A. Santos; Denielsan Martins	14 July 2017		Praia, Cape Verde	
4 × 400 m relay	3:20.62	Cape Verde; Bruno Moniz; Izequiel Evora; Maurízio Alves; Samuel Freire	25 January 2014	Lusophony Games	Bambolim, India	

=== Women ===
Event	Record	Athlete	Date	Meet	Place	Ref.
100 m	11.91 (+1.7 m/s)	Michaela Rodrigues	20 May 2022	Ibero-American Championships	La Nucia, Spain	
200 m	25.07 NWI	Lidiane Lopes	25 January 2014	Lusophony Games	Bambolim, India	
400 m	54.50	Vera Barbosa	9 May 2009		Osaka, Japan	
800 m	2:17.9	Carla Rodrigues	18 June 2002		Lisbon, Portugal	
1500 m	4:16.06	Carla Mendes	20 June 2019	Meeting Iberoamericano de Atletismo	Huelva, Spain	
3000 m	10:01.09	Sonia Lopes	19 June 2003		Ferrara, Italy	
5000 m	17:41.29	Sonia Lopes	6 June 2004		Mestre, Italy	
10,000 m	37:46.59	Sonia Lopes	11 May 2003		Lumezzane, Italy	
Half marathon	1:18:01	Sonia Lopes	21 October 2007		Cremona, Italy	
Marathon	2:58:00	Sonia Lopes	27 April 2003		Padua, Italy	
100 m hurdles	14.97	Cláudia Moreira	14 July 2002		Lisbon, Portugal	
400 m hurdles	1:01.24	Vera Barbosa	9 July 2008		Lisbon, Portugal	
3000 m steeplechase	10:58.77	Sonia Lopes (Note: Sonia Lopes gained Italian citizenship on 1 August 2007)	19 May 2007		Marcon, Italy	
High jump	1.62 m	Vera Barbosa	21 January 2006		Lisbon, Portugal	
Pole vault	2.30 m	Cleisa Tavares	25 April 2007		Vila Real de Santo António, Portugal	
Long jump	5.50 m (+1.9 m/s)	Claudina Borges	27 June 2010		Lisbon, Portugal	
Long jump	5.50 m (+1.7 m/s)	Claudina Borges	4 July 2010		Setúbal, Portugal	
Long jump	5.50 m (+1.7 m/s)	Claudina Borges	11 July 2010		Lisbon, Portugal	
Triple jump	11.85 m	Luciliana Évora	4 August 2000		Almada, Portugal	
Shot put	15.12 m	Antónia Borges (Note: Antónia Borges transferred to Portugal in 2005)	8 August 2004		Huelva, Spain	
Discus throw	43.79 m	Sónia Borges (Note: Sónia Borges transferred to Portugal in 2005)	6 June 2010	Ibero-American Championships	San Fernando, Spain	
Hammer throw	41.48 m	Antónia Borges (Note: Antónia Borges transferred to Portugal in 2005)	10 June 2004		Beija, ?	
Javelin throw	39.90 m	Ionilde Mendes	27 May 2007		Seixal, Portugal	
Heptathlon	3632 pts w	Ana Correia	24–25 April 2010		Rio Maior, Portugal	
Heptathlon	100m H / High jump / Shot put / 200m / Long jump / Javelin / 800m; 17.46w / 1.36 m / 9.29 m / 27.82w / 4.35 m w / 26.46 m / 2:30.44					
20 km walk (road)						
50 km walk (road)						
4 × 100 m relay	48.36	J. de Pina; A. Almeida; M. Barreto; M. do Rosário	28/29 July 2019		Praia, Cape Verde	
4 × 400 m relay						

== Indoor ==
=== Men ===
Event	Record	Athlete	Date	Meet	Place	Ref.
60 m	6.95 (1st)	Jordin Andrade	16 January 2016	UW Preview	Seattle, United States	
60 m	6.95 (2nd)	Jordin Andrade	16 January 2016	UW Preview	Seattle, United States	
200 m	21.81	Jordin Andrade	11 February 2017	BSU Challenge	Nampa, United States	
400 m	48.02	Jordin Andrade	8 February 2020	South Carolina Invitational	Columbia, United States	
400 m	47.03 A (Note: not recognized by World Athletics)	Jordin Andrade	28 February 2015	Mountain West Championships	Albuquerque, United States	
800 m	1:53.44	Mauricio Alves	2 February 2014		Pombal, Portugal	
1000 m	2:28.29	Ruben Sança	25 February 2006	NEICAAA Championships	Boston, United States	
1500 m	4:05.98	Andrelino Furtado	5 February 2011		Pombal, Portugal	
Mile	4:07.37	Ruben Sança	13 February 2009	Boston University Valentine Invitational	Boston, United States	
3000 m	8:07.50 (Note: outdoor mark ratified as absolute record)	Ruben Sança	28 January 2011	Boston University Terrier Classic	Boston, United States	
5000 m	13:56.46 (Note: outdoor mark ratified as absolute record)	Ruben Sança	29 January 2010	Boston University Terrier Classic	Boston, United States	
60 m hurdles	7.75	Henry Andrade	13 March 1993	World Championships	Toronto, Canada	
High jump	1.97 m	Nelson Évora	5 February 2000		Espinho, Portugal	
Pole vault	4.40 m	José Rosa	9 January 2011		Alpiarça, Portugal	
Pole vault	4.40 m (Note: record set during heptathlon competition)	José Rosa	27 February 2011		Pombal, Portugal	
Pole vault	4.40 m	José Rosa	4 February 2012		Espinho, Portugal	
Pole vault	4.40 m (Note: record set during heptathlon competition)	José Rosa	19 February 2012		Espinho, Portugal	
Long jump	7.50 m	Nelson Évora	10 February 2002		Espinho, Portugal	
Triple jump	15.61 m	Nelson Évora	3 March 2001		Lisbon, Portugal	
Shot put	12.58 m (Note: record set during heptathlon competition) (Note: outdoor mark ratified as absolute record)	José Rosa	26 February 2011		Pombal, Portugal	
Heptathlon	4968 pts	José Rosa	26–27 February 2011		Pombal, Portugal	
Heptathlon	60m / Long jump / Shot put / High jump / 60m H / Pole vault / 1000m; 7.14 / 6.34 m / 12.58 m / 1.91 m / 9.10 / 4.40 m / 3:01.01					
5000 m walk						
4 × 400 m relay						

=== Women ===
Event	Record	Athlete	Date	Meet	Place	Ref.
60 m	7.87	Lidiane Gomes-Lopes	31 January 2015		Val-de-Reuil, France	
200 m	25.11	Lidiane Gomes-Lopes	1 February 2015		Val-de-Reuil, France	
400 m	55.84	Vera Barbosa	14 February 2009		Pombal, Portugal	
800 m	2:20.08	Nadia Goncalves	7 March 2004		Espinho, Portugal	
1500 m						
3000 m	11:37.38	Sonia Lopes	9 March 2001	World Championships	Lisbon, Portugal	
60 m hurdles	9.53	Claudia Moreira	16 January 2005		Alpiarca, Portugal	
High jump	1.55 m	Kidline Gomes	16 February 2019		Braga, Portugal	
High jump	1.61 m (Note: record set during heptathlon competition)	Claudina Borges	9 January 2011		Pombal, Portugal	
Pole vault	2.40 m (Note: outdoor mark ratified as absolute record)	Cleisa Tavares	30 January 2010		Pombal, Portugal	
Long jump	5.66 m (Note: outdoor mark ratified as absolute record)	Evelise Veiga	27 January 2012		Pombal, Portugal	
Triple jump	11.89 m (Note: outdoor mark ratified as absolute record)	Luciliana Évora	4 March 2001		Lisbon, Portugal	
Shot put	15.15 m	Vanda Rodrigues	28 February 2009		Pombal, Portugal	
Pentathlon	2482 pts	Ana Correia	27 December 2008		Pombal, Portugal	
Pentathlon	60m H / High jump / Shot put / Long jump / 800m; 10.94 / 1.27 m / 8.52 m / 4.60 m / 2:31.87					
Pentathlon	3092 pts	Claudina Borges	9 January 2011		Pombal, Portugal	
Pentathlon	60m H / High jump / Shot put / Long jump / 800m; 10.11 / 1.61 m / 8.75 m / 5.27 m / 3:00.18					
3000 m walk						
4 × 400 m relay						
