= Jani Chathurangani =

Sri Lankan track and field athlete

Jani Chathurangani Silva
Personal information
- Nationality: Sri Lankan
- Born: 21 August 1981 (age 45) Sri Lanka

Sport
- Sport: Running
- Events: 100 metres, 200 metres
- College team: represented the Sri Lankan Air Force

Jani Chathurangani Chandra Silva Hondamuni (born August 21, 1981) is a Sri Lankan track and field athlete who competes mainly in sprinting.

== South Asian Games ==
In 2006 the South Asian Games held in Colombo, she clocked 11.76 seconds to take the women's 100m silver medal and was also part of the 4x100 relay team which won gold. After the games, during a doping test she tested positive for Nandrolone.

== Doping ban ==
After the 2006 South Asian Games held in Colombo, she was tested positive for nandrolone. She gave two urine samples. Both contained high level of nandrolone. The A sample contained 27.5 ng/ml and the B sample contained half as much as the A sample. However, the tolerance for doping by the world anti-doping body WADA is only 2 ng/ml. She was suspended pending further enquiries.

The head of disciplinary committee of the South Asian Games, Wijayadasa Rajapaksa, delivered the controversial ruling at a news conference held at the National Sports Medicine Institute in Sri Lanka. Despite Silva guilty of taking a banned anabolic steroid nandrolone, she was cleared of all charges, because the "chain of custody" of the medical investigation was not coordinated properly. Despite the medical committee stating that urine sample A contained a very high percentage of nandrolone and a high concentration like that can only go to blood by injection form, Silva was cleared of the charges and allowed to continue athletics. The decision was then overturned by the Court of Arbitration for Sport, and she was handed a two-year doping ban. The ban ran from 14 April 2008 to 13 April 2010. She was also disqualified from all results from 25 August 2006.
