= Nelson Cruz (athlete) =

Cape Verdean athlete

Nelson Cruz (born 31 December 1977) is a Cape Verdean athlete, specializing in long-distance running, marathon and half marathon.

Born in Lisbon to Cape Verdean parents, Nelson grew up in Portugal, having visited Cape Verde for the first time in August 2006, where he won the 10,000m run in the National Youth Convention.

With double nationality (Portuguese and Cape Verdean), Nelson chose to compete for Cape Verde in international events. He is trained by Pedro Pessoa and competes for CDR Praia da Salema, having previously represented União Desportiva de Caxienses and Casal de Santo António sports club.

Nelson holds the Cape Verdean national records in all the long run races. In 2005, he represented Cape Verde for the first time internationally, in the 2005 World Championships in Athletics. Later, he won the gold medal in the half marathon in the 2006 Lusophony Games.

With such a track record, he was invited to be part of the Cape Verdean team in the Beijing Olympics 2008, through one of two wildcards for athletics given to Cape Verde by the International Olympic Committee.

His personal best for marathon is 2:17:36.

In 2016 Nelson became the Portuguese Nacional Champion in Cross Country, with a time of 30:43.

== Competition record ==
- 2005 Rotterdam Marathon: 2:19:14 NR
- 2006 Carlos Lopes Gold Marathon: 6th, 2:17:39
- 2007 Carlos Lopes Gold Marathon: 5th, 2:22:43

Year	Competition	Venue	Position	Event	Notes
2005	World Championships	Helsinki, Finland	38th	Marathon	2:22:12
2006	Lusophony Games	Macau, China	1st	Half marathon	1:09:08
2007	World Championships	Osaka, Japan	DNF	Marathon	
2008	Olympic Games	Beijing, China	48th	Marathon	2:23:47

== See also ==
- Cape Verde at the 2006 Lusophony Games
- Cape Verde at the 2008 Summer Olympics
