= Felismina Cavela =

Angolan middle-distance runner

Felismina Cavela (born August 24, 1992 in Kasonge, Cuanza Sul) is an Angolan middle-distance runner. At the 2012 Summer Olympics, she competed in the Women's 800 metres.
