= Lidiane Lopes =

Cape Verdean sprinter (born 1994)

Personal information
- Nationality: Cape Verdean
- Born: 1 September 1994 (age 31)
- Height: 1.78 m (5 ft 10 in) (2016)
- Weight: 70 kg (154 lb) (2016)

Sport
- Sport: Track and field
- Event(s): 100 metres 200 metres

Achievements and titles
- Personal best(s): 100 metres: 12.38; 200 metres: 25.53
Medal record
Representing Cape Verde
Lusophony Games
Silver medal – second place	2014 Goa	200 metres

Lidiane Lopes (born 1 September 1994) is a Cape Verdean sprinter who specialises in the 100 metres and 200 metres. She is the current Cape Verdean record holder in the 100-metre sprint. Lopes has competed at both the 2012 and 2016 Summer Olympics. At both Olympics, she competed in the 100 metres. She has also competed in a World Championships, a World Junior Championships, a World Youth Championships, a Jeux de la Francophonie, a Lusophony Games, an African Games, and an Ibero-American Athletics Championships.

== Competition ==
=== 2011–12 ===
Lopes' debut at an international athletics competition was at the 2011 World Youth Championships, where she competed in the 200 metres. She finished last in her heat and ran a personal best time of 26.69 seconds. She did not progress to the semi-final round. She then competed at the 2012 World Junior Championships in the 100 metres. She was disqualified from her heat and therefore did not race again at the competition.

=== 2012 Summer Olympics ===
Lopes' next major competition was the 2012 Summer Olympics in London. She qualified and competed in the 100 metres. For the preliminary round, she was drawn in heat four. In the heat of nine athletes, Lopes finished fourth in a time of 12.72 seconds. She was 1.12 seconds slower than the heat winner, Toea Wisil of Papua New Guinea. Overall, Lopes' time was the 17th fastest in the preliminary round. She did not progress to the heat round proper. By competing at the 2012 Games, she became the youngest Cape Verdean to compete at an Olympic Games at an age of 17 years and 337 days.

=== 2013–16 ===
At the 2013 Jeux de la Francophonie, Lopes competed in both the 100 metres and 200 metres. In the 100 metres she ran a time of 12.85 seconds and finished second last overall with Dianne Audrey Nioze of Seychelles the only athlete slower than her. Lopes did not progress to the final. In the 200 metres, Lopes came last in a time of 26.17 seconds and did not qualify for the final. At the 2014 Lusophony Games, Lopes finished fourth in the 100 metres; in a time of 12.49 seconds; and she won the silver medal in the 200 metres; in a time of 25.07 seconds. In her medal winning event, the 200 metres, she finished 0.07 seconds behind Indian Rengitha Chellah. The 2015 World Championships was Lopes' first senior World Championships. She competed in the 100 metres and finished last in her heat with a Cape Verdean national record time of 12.43 seconds. Overall, she was the 49th fastest out of 53 athletes and she did not progress to the semi-final round. At the 2015 African Games, Lopes finished 27th overall in the 100 metres in a time of 12.55 seconds and 29th overall in the 200 metres in a time of 25.53 seconds. Lopes' next major competition was the 2016 Ibero-American Athletics Championships. She competed in the 100 metres and finished last overall in a time of 12.67 seconds.

=== 2016 Summer Olympics ===
At the 2016 Summer Olympics, Lopes competed in the 100 metres. For the preliminary round, she was drawn in heat two, a heat containing seven other athletes alongside Lopes. In the race on 12 August 2016, she ran a time of 12.38 seconds. Lopes' time was a new Cape Verdean national record. After the race she told Ocean Press: "I have no words. I'm very happy". Lopes' time was the 9th fastest out of 24 athletes in the preliminary round; her time was 0.04 seconds slower than the slowest athlete to progress to the next round and, therefore, she was eliminated.
