= Lalit Mathur =

Indian sprinter (born 1994)

Personal information
- Born: 18 December 1994 (age 31) Karala, Delhi, India

Sport
- Country: India
- Sport: Track and field
- Event: 400 metres

Lalit Mathur (born 18 December 1994) is an Indian sprinter. He was part of India's six-member 4 × 400 metres relay team at the 2016 Summer Olympics.

== Early and personal life ==
Mathur was born on 18 December 1994 in the village of Karala which is located northwest of Delhi. He started practising athletics at the age of five. His father Vinod Mathur, who is a cable TV operator, took him for training every morning on his bicycle for three years. In order to consume unadulterated milk, Mathur domesticated a buffalo at his home.

Mathur is claimed to have played the body double of Farhan Akhtar in the 2013 Bollywood film Bhaag Milkha Bhaag. As of July 2016, he is a third year student at Sri Guru Nanak Dev Khalsa College in Delhi.
