= Graciela Martins =

Bissau-Guinean sprinter

Personal information
- Born: April 5, 1987 (age 38)
- Height: 1.66 m (5 ft 5 1/2 in)
- Weight: 60 kg (130 lb)

Sport
- Country: Guinea-Bissau
- Sport: Athletics
- Event: 400m

Graciela Martins (born 5 April 1987 in Bissau, Guinea-Bissau) is a Bissau-Guinean athlete. She competed in the 400 m event at the 2012 Summer Olympics in London.

She also represented her country at the 2011 World Championships in Athletics. She was a silver medalist in the 400 metres hurdles at the 2014 Lusophony Games.
