= Samuel Freire =

Cape Verdean long-distance runner

Personal information
- Born: 28 August 1990 (age 35)

Sport
- Country: Cape Verde
- Sport: Long-distance running
- Event(s): 5000 m, 10,000 m, Half marathon, Marathon

Achievements and titles
- Personal bests: 1500 m: 3:45.94 NR (Bilbao 2017); 3000 m: 8:07.86 NR (Faro 2019); 5000 m: 13:53.36 NR (Brussels 2024); 10,000 m: 28:28.93 NR (Caldas da Rainha 2024); Road; 10 km: 29:33 (Lisbon 2021); 15 km: 14:05 NR (Lisbon 2021); Half marathon: 1:02:47 NR (Barcelona 2023); Marathon: 2:11:01 NR (Seville 2024)

Samuel Freire (born 28 August 1990) is a Cape Verdean long-distance runner who represented his country at the 2024 Olympics in the Marathon. He also competed at the 2023 World Athletics Championships, 2023 World Athletics Road Running Championships, and the 2025 World Athletics Championships. He holds numerous Cape Verdean athletics records.
