= Silvia Panguana =

Mozambican hurdler

Silvia Eduardo Panguana (born 16 February 1993 in Maputo) is a Mozambican track and field hurdler. At the 2012 Summer Olympics, she competed in the Women's 100 metres hurdles.
