= Denielsan Martins =

Cape Verdean sprinter (born 1987)

Personal information
- Nationality: Cape Verdean
- Born: 16 March 1987 (age 38)

Sport
- Sport: Track and field
- Event: 100m

Denielsan Martins (born 16 March 1987) is a Cape Verdean sprinter. He competed in the 100 metres event at the 2013 World Championships in Athletics.
