= Holder da Silva =

Guinea-Bissauan sprinter

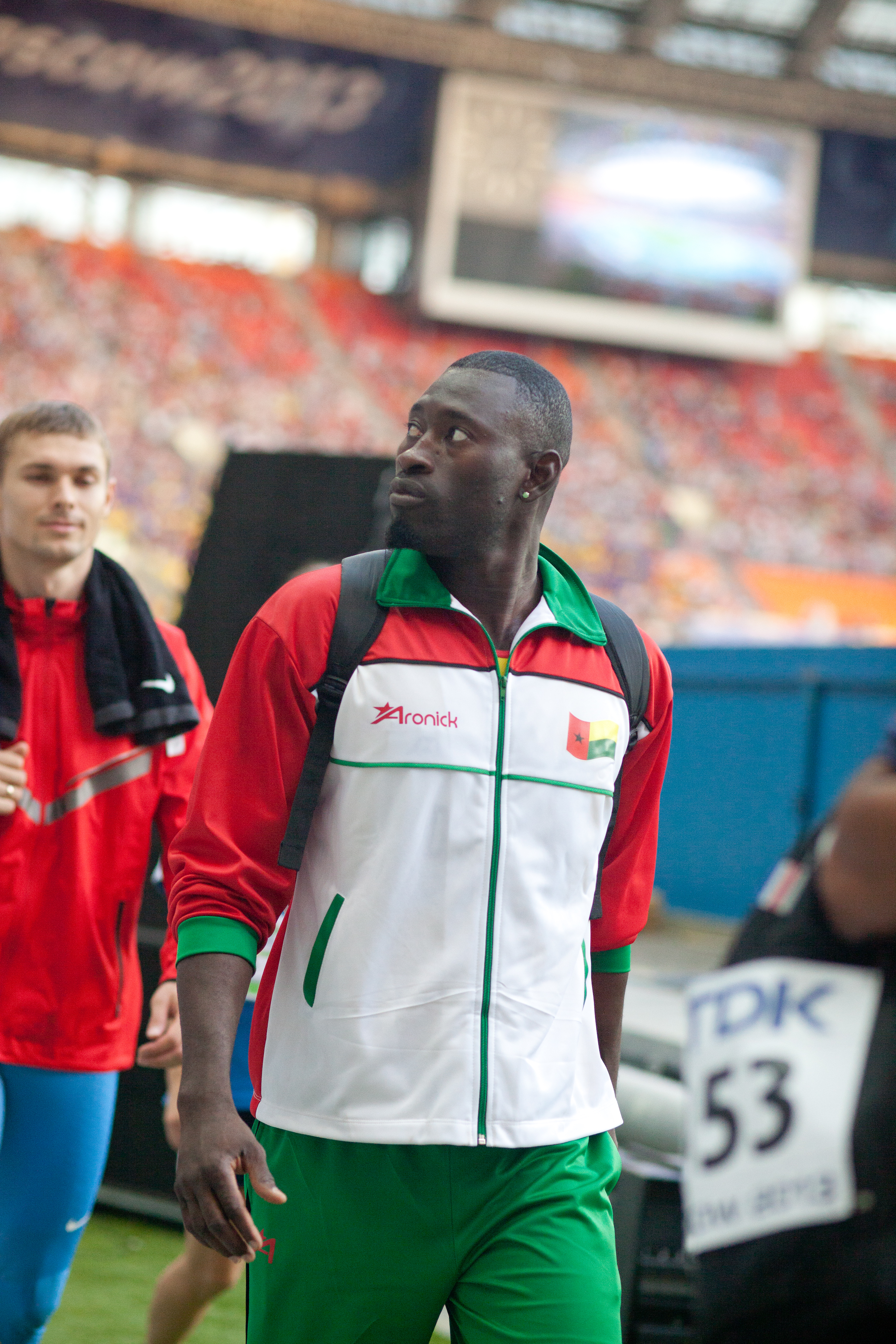
- Silva at the 2013 World Championships

Personal information
- Born: 12 January 1988 (age 38) Bissau, Guinea-Bissau
- Height: 1.81 m (5 ft 11 in)
- Weight: 75 kg (165 lb)

Sport
- Country: Guinea-Bissau
- Sport: Athletics
- Event: 100 metres
- Club: Benfica
Medal record
Lusophony Games
Representing Guinea-Bissau
Gold medal – first place	Goa 2014	200 m
Bronze medal – third place	Macau 2006	200 m
- Updated on 22 July 2012

Holder Ocante da Silva (born 12 January 1988) is a Guinea-Bissauan sprinter who specializes in the 100 metres. He was born in Bissau. His personal best time is 10.36 seconds, achieved in July 2009 in Lisbon.

He competed at the 2007 World Championships and the 2008 Olympic Games without progressing to the second round. In Beijing he placed 5th in his heat in a time of 10.58 seconds.

At the 2012 Summer Olympics Men's 100m event, Silva progressed from the preliminaries, setting a seasonal best time of 10.69 seconds, before being eliminated in the first round.

== International competitions ==
Year	Competition	Venue	Position	Event	Notes
Representing Guinea-Bissau
2006	World Junior Championships	Beijing, China	44th (h)	100 m	11.01
2006	Lusophony Games	Macau, China	3rd	200 m	22.42
2007	All-Africa Games	Osaka, Japan	26th (h)	100 m	10.67
2007	All-Africa Games	Osaka, Japan	17th (sf)	200 m	21.62
2007	World Championships	Osaka, Japan	41st (h)	100 m	10.68
2008	Olympic Games	Beijing, China	46th (h)	100 m	10.58
2009	Lusophony Games	Lisbon, Portugal	4th	100 m	10.36
2009	Lusophony Games	Lisbon, Portugal	4th	200 m	21.18
2009	Jeux de la Francophonie	Beirut, Lebanon	14th (sf)	100 m	10.55
2009	Jeux de la Francophonie	Beirut, Lebanon	14th (h)	200 m	22.26
2010	World Indoor Championships	Doha, Qatar	38th (h)	60 m	7.07
2011	World Championships	Daegu, South Korea	49th (h)	200 m	21.82
2012	World Indoor Championships	Istanbul, Turkey	24th (h)	60 m	6.95
2012	African Championships	Porto-Novo, Benin	26th (h)	100 m	10.82
2012	Olympic Games	London, United Kingdom	51st (h)	100 m	10.71
2013	World Championships	Moscow, Russia	52nd (h)	100 m	10.70
2014	Lusophony Games	Bambolim, India	1st	200 m	21.40
2014	Ibero-American Championships	São Paulo, Brazil	8th (h)	100 m	10.72
2014	Ibero-American Championships	São Paulo, Brazil	9th (h)	200 m	21.90
2014	African Championships	Marrakesh, Morocco	19th (sf)	100 m	10.66
2014	African Championships	Marrakesh, Morocco	28th (h)	200 m	21.65
2015	World Championships	Beijing, China	46th (h)	200 m	10.68
2016	Ibero-American Championships	Rio de Janeiro, Brazil	18th (h)	100 m	10.77
2016	Ibero-American Championships	Rio de Janeiro, Brazil	19th (h)	200 m	21.90
2016	African Championships	Durban, South Africa	30th (h)	100 m	10.93
2016	Olympic Games	Rio de Janeiro, Brazil	10th (p)	100 m	10.97
2018	World Indoor Championships	Birmingham, United Kingdom	44th (h)	60 m	7.20

== Personal bests ==
Outdoor

- 100 metres – 10.36 (+0.5 m/s, Salamanca 2009)
- 200 metres – 21.01 (+1.4 m/s, Salamanca 2009)

Indoor

- 60 metres – 6.80 (Pombal 2009)
- 200 metres – 22.08 (Espinho 2008)
