= Cape Verde at the 2025 World Aquatics Championships =

- Flag of Cape Verde
- World Aquatics code: CPV
- National federation: Federeção Cabo-Verdiana de Natação

in Singapore
- Competitors: 4 in 1 sport
- Medals: Gold 0 Silver 0 Bronze 0 Total 0

World Aquatics Championships appearances
- 2019; 2022; 2023; 2024; 2025

Cape Verde will compete at the 2025 World Aquatics Championships in Singapore from July 11 to August 3, 2025.

== Swimming ==
Cape Verdean swimmers have achieved qualifying standards in the following events.

Men

Athlete	Event	Heat		Semifinal		Final	
Athlete	Event	Time	Rank	Time	Rank	Time	Rank
Rohan Shearer	100 m freestyle	52.45	69	Did not advance			
Rohan Shearer	200 m freestyle	DNS					
Jose Tati	50 m freestyle	25.09	86	Did not advance			
Jose Tati	50 m backstroke	34.68	59	Did not advance			

Women

Athlete	Event	Heat		Semifinal		Final	
Athlete	Event	Time	Rank	Time	Rank	Time	Rank
Kaila Dacruz	50 m backstroke	32.05	54	Did not advance			
Kaila Dacruz	100 m backstroke	1:09.06	53	Did not advance			
Jayla Pina	50 m breaststroke	33.26 NR	40	Did not advance			
Jayla Pina	100 m breaststroke	1:14.00	51	Did not advance			

Mixed

Athlete	Event	Heat		Final	
Athlete	Event	Time	Rank	Time	Rank
Rohan Shearer; Jayla Pina; Kaila Dacruz; Jose Tati	4 × 100 m freestyle relay	3:53.70 NR	28	Did not advance	
Rohan Shearer; Jayla Pina; Kaila Dacruz; Jose Tati	4 × 100 m medley relay	4:32.16	34	Did not advance	
