= List of flag bearers for Cape Verde at the Olympics =

Cape Verde at the Olympics
- IOC code: CPV
- NOC: Comité Olímpico Caboverdeano
- Website: www.coc.cv (in Portuguese)
- Medals: Gold 0 Silver 0 Bronze 1 Total 1

Summer appearances
- 1996; 2000; 2004; 2008; 2012; 2016; 2020; 2024

This is a list of flag bearers who have represented Cape Verde at the Olympics.

Flag bearers carry the national flag of their country at the opening ceremony of the Olympic Games.

#	Event year	Season	Flag bearer	Sport
1	1996	Summer	Manuel Jesús Rodrígues	Official
2	2000	Summer	Isménia do Frederico	Athletics
3	2004	Summer	Wania Monteiro	Gymnastics
4	2008	Summer	Wania Monteiro	Gymnastics
5	2012	Summer	Adysângela Moniz	Judo
6	2016	Summer	Maria Andrade	Taekwondo
7	2020	Summer	Jordin Andrade	Athletics
7	2020	Summer	Jayla Pina	Swimming
8	2024	Summer	Daniel Varela de Pina	Boxing
8	2024	Summer	Djamila Silva	Judo

== See also ==
- Cape Verde at the Olympics
