= Cape Verde at the 1996 Summer Olympics =

- IOC code: CPV
- NOC: Cape Verdean Olympic Committee

in Atlanta
- Competitors: 4 in 1 sport
- Flag bearer: Manuel Jesús Rodrígues
- Medals: Gold 0 Silver 0 Bronze 0 Total 0

Summer Olympics appearances (overview)
- 1996; 2000; 2004; 2008; 2012; 2016; 2020; 2024

Cape Verde competed at the 1996 Summer Olympics in Atlanta, United States, which were held from 19 July to 4 August 1996. The country's participation in Atlanta marked its first appearance at the Summer Olympics. The Cape Verdean athlete delegation consisted of four competitors: sprinters Alfayaya Embalo and Isménia do Frederico, hurdler Henry Andrade, and marathoner António Zeferino.

Embalo was set to compete in the men's 100 metres though did not start in his event. Frederico then competed in the women's 100 metres on the same day, though had placed last in her preliminary round and did not advance further. Two days later, Andrade competed in the men's 110 metres hurdles and did not finish his race. Finally, Zeferino competed in the men's marathon and placed last.

== Background ==
The 1996 Summer Olympics were held in Atlanta, United States, from 19 July to 4 August 1996. Cape Verde's appearance at the Games was its first ever appearance at the Summer Olympics, with the Cape Verdean Olympic Committee only being recognized by the International Olympic Committee three years prior. Manuel Jesús Rodrígues, a team official, was designated as the flagbearer for the nation at the opening ceremony.

== Competitors ==
List of Cape Verdean competitors at the 1996 Summer Olympics
Sport	Men	Women	Total
Athletics	3	1	4
Total	3	1	4

== Athletics ==
=== Men ===
Sprinter Alfayaya Embalo was entered to compete in the heats of the men's 100 metres on 26 July against eight other people but did not start in his event. Hurdler Henry Andrade was the next male athlete to compete, competing in the heats of the men's 110 metres hurdles on 28 July. He raced against seven other people though did not finish the race. Long-distance runner António Zeferino would be the last competitor for Cape Verde at these games. In the men's marathon on 4 August, he recorded a time of 2:34:13 and had placed 94th.

Track and road events

Athletes	Events	Heat Round 1		Heat Round 2		Semifinal		Final	
Athletes	Events	Time	Rank	Time	Rank	Time	Rank	Time	Rank
Alfayaya Embalo	100 metres	DNS		Did not advance					
Henry Andrade	110 metres hurdles	DNF		Did not advance					
António Zeferino	Marathon	N/A						2:34:13	94

=== Women ===
Sprinter Isménia do Frederico was the only woman in the delegation. Frederico competed in the heats of the women's 100 metres on 26 July against seven other people. She had placed last in her heat with a time of 13.03 seconds and did not advance further into the event.

Track and road events

Athletes	Events	Heat Round 1		Heat Round 2		Semifinal		Final	
Athletes	Events	Time	Rank	Time	Rank	Time	Rank	Time	Rank
Isménia do Frederico	100 metres	13.03	52	Did not advance					
