= Cape Verde at the 2023 World Aquatics Championships =

- Flag of Cape Verde
- FINA code: CPV
- National federation: Federeção Cabo-Verdiana de Natação

in Fukuoka, Japan
- Competitors: 4 in 1 sport
- Medals: Gold 0 Silver 0 Bronze 0 Total 0

World Aquatics Championships appearances
- 2019; 2022; 2023; 2024

Cape Verde is set to compete at the 2023 World Aquatics Championships in Fukuoka, Japan from 14 to 30 July.

== Swimming ==
Cape Verde entered 4 swimmers.

Men

Athlete	Event	Heat		Semifinal		Final	
Athlete	Event	Time	Rank	Time	Rank	Time	Rank
Ailton Lima	50 metre freestyle	26.16	95	Did not advance			
Ailton Lima	50 metre butterfly	28.66	78	Did not advance			
Troy Pina	50 metre backstroke	30.85	60	Did not advance			
Troy Pina	100 metre butterfly	1:05.63	74	Did not advance			

Women

Athlete	Event	Heat		Semifinal		Final	
Athlete	Event	Time	Rank	Time	Rank	Time	Rank
Jayla Pina	100 metre breaststroke	1:14.09 NR	50	Did not advance			
Jayla Pina	200 metre breaststroke	2:41.75 NR	31	Did not advance			
La Troya Pina	50 metre freestyle	30.71	86	Did not advance			
La Troya Pina	50 metre breaststroke	38.14	45	Did not advance			

Mixed

Athlete	Event	Heat		Final	
Athlete	Event	Time	Rank	Time	Rank
Jayla Pina; Ailton Lima; La Troya Pina; Troy Pina	4 × 100 m freestyle relay	4:07.35	40	Did not advance	
La Troya Pina; Jayla Pina; Troy Pina; Ailton Lima	4 × 100 m medley relay	4:37.11	38	Did not advance	
