= Cape Verde at the 2016 Summer Paralympics =

- IPC code: CPV
- NPC: Comité Caboverdeano Desp. Para Deficientes

in Rio de Janeiro
- Competitors: 2 in 1 sports
- Flag bearer: Marcio Fernandes
- Medals Ranked 76th: Gold 0 Silver 0 Bronze 1 Total 1

Summer Paralympics appearances (overview)
- 2004; 2008; 2012; 2016; 2020; 2024

Cape Verde sent a delegation to compete at the 2016 Summer Paralympics in Rio de Janeiro, Brazil, from 7 to 18 September 2016. This was the nations' fourth appearance at a Summer Paralympic Games since it made its debut at the 2004 Athens Summer Paralympics. Cape Verde was represented by two athletes in Rio de Janeiro: sprinter Gracelino Barbosa and javelin thrower Márcio Fernandes, who qualified for the Games by meeting the qualification standards of their events. Barbosa won the country's first Paralympic medal with his third-place finish in the men's 400 metres T20 competition and Fernandes came ninth in the F44 men's javelin event.

== Background ==
Cape Verde's first appearance in the Paralympic movement was at the 2004 Athens Summer Paralympics. The country has participated in every Summer Paralympic Games since, making Rio de Janeiro the fourth time they have taken part in a Summer Paralympiad. Entering the Rio Summer Games, Cape Verde had not won its first medal at the Paralympics. The 2016 Summer Paralympics were held from 7–18 September 2016 with a total of 4,328 athletes representing 159 National Paralympic Committees taking part. Cape Verde sent two athletes to Rio de Janeiro: sprinter Gracelino Barbosa and javelin thrower Márcio Fernandes. The two athletes were joined by chef de mission and president of the Comité Caboverdeano Desp. Para Deficientes Rodrigo Bejarano, coaches Carlos Fernandes and Serafim Gadelho and an unnamed physiotherapist. The delegation left Cape Verde for Rio de Janeiro on 28 August. Fernandes was selected as the flag bearer for the parade of nations during the opening ceremony.

== Disability classifications ==
Every participant at the Paralympics has their disability grouped into one of five disability categories; amputation, the condition may be congenital or sustained through injury or illness; cerebral palsy; wheelchair athletes, there is often overlap between this and other categories; visual impairment, including blindness; Les autres, any physical disability that does not fall strictly under one of the other categories, for example dwarfism or multiple sclerosis. Each Paralympic sport then has its own classifications, dependent upon the specific physical demands of competition. Events are given a code, made of numbers and letters, describing the type of event and classification of the athletes competing. Some sports, such as athletics, divide athletes by both the category and severity of their disabilities, other sports, for example swimming, group competitors from different categories together, the only separation being based on the severity of the disability.

== Medalists ==
Cape Verde finished tied for twelfth among African countries for total gold medals and tied for 76th overall, winning one bronze. Mozambique also won a single bronze medal.

Medal	Name	Sport	Event	Date
Bronze	Gracelino Barbosa	Athletics	Men's 400 m T20	September 9

== Athletics ==
Gracelino Barbosa was 31 years old at the time of the Rio Summer Games and this was his first time competing in the Paralympic movement. He has an intellectual disability and is classified as T20. Barbosa qualified for the Games because of his sixth-place finish and personal best time of 50.55 seconds in the men's 400 metres event at the 2015 IPC Athletics World Championships in October that year. Barbosa spent time in Portugal and Cape Verde training for the Games. In an interview before the Paralympics, he stated that his hope was to achieve a good performance in Rio de Janeiro and was confident over improving his personal best time, "Any athlete has the ambition to get on the podium and I do not escape the rule and I want to get there very strong." On 8 September, Barbosa participated in the heats of the men's 400 metres T20 competition. Assigned to heat one, he posted a new African record time of 48.77 seconds, ranking him second out of six finishing sprinters. Barbosa advanced to the final along with the seven other quickest athletes because his time was third fastest overall. (Note: Two athletes, Ty Griffin and Edixon Pirela, were disqualified.) During the next day's final, he finished third, and improved the African record time of 48.55 seconds, winning him the bronze medal and Cape Verde's first medal in Paralympic competition. Barbosa was congratulated by Jorge Carlos Fonseca, the president of Cape Verde, via telephone, and the athlete spoke of his desire to inspire more people in Cape Verde to take up sports.

At the age of ten in 1994, Márcio Fernandes was involved in a car accident which resulted in the amputation of his left leg and has used a prosthetic since. He was participating in his second Paralympic Games after representing Cape Verde at the 2012 London Paralympics and he was 33 years old at the time of the Rio Summer Paralympic Games. Fernandes was placed into the disability classification T44. He earned automatic qualification to the Rio Games because his throw of 50.91 metres, achieved at the 2015 African Games on 15 September 2015, exceeded the "A" qualifying standard for the F44 men's javelin event by 2.91 metres. Fernandes spent time training in London, Portugal and Cape Verde as part of his preparation for the Paralympics. Before the Paralympics, he said he believed in his potential and stated he would perform to the best of his ability, "Expectations are high, I was world champion last year and it's normal for people to want to repeat every success. I will do my best, compete with maximum strength and fight to be on the podium, but everything will depend on the conditioners and other opponents. I will give my 200% and soon you will see the results." Fernandes competed in the men's F44 men's javelin on 9 September. On his first try, he achieved a throw of 50.46 metres, 51.37 metres on his second attempt, and his third (and best) was 51.67 metres. This placed Fernandes ninth out of sixteen athletes.

Men's Track

Athlete	Events	Heat		Final	
Athlete	Events	Time	Rank	Time	Rank
Gracelino Barbosa	400 m T20	48.77	2 Q	48.55	(bronze)

Men's Field

Athlete	Events	Result	Rank
Márcio Fernandes	Javelin F42-44	51.67	9

== See also ==
- Cape Verde at the 2016 Summer Olympics
