= Cape Verde at the 2024 Summer Olympics =

- IOC code: CPV
- NOC: Comité Olímpico Caboverdeano

in Paris, France 26 July 2024 – 11 August 2024
- Competitors: 7 (4 men and 3 women) in 5 sports
- Flag bearers (opening): Daniel Varela de Pina & Djamila Silva
- Flag bearers (closing): Samuel Freire & Ivanusa Moreira
- Medals Ranked 84th: Gold 0 Silver 0 Bronze 1 Total 1

Summer Olympics appearances (overview)
- 1996; 2000; 2004; 2008; 2012; 2016; 2020; 2024

Cape Verde (also known as Cabo Verde, its official IOC name) competed at the 2024 Summer Olympics in Paris, France, from 26 July to 11 August 2024, and it was the nation's eighth consecutive appearance at these games.

Cape Verde earned their first Olympic medal in any sport, with boxer Daniel Varela de Pina winning bronze in the Men's 51 kg category.

== Medalists ==
Medal	Name	Sport	Event	Date
Bronze	Daniel Varela de Pina	Boxing	Men's 51 kg	4 August

Medals by sport
Sport	1st place, gold medalist(s)	2nd place, silver medalist(s)	3rd place, bronze medalist(s)	Total
Boxing	0	0	1	1
Total	0	0	1	1

== Competitors ==
The following is the list of number of competitors in the Games.

Sport	Men	Women	Total
Athletics	1	0	1
Boxing	1	1	2
Fencing	1	0	1
Judo	0	1	1
Swimming	1	1	2
Total	4	3	7

== Athletics ==
One Cape Verde runner will compete at Paris 2024, after receiving the direct universality spots in the following event:

Key

- Note–Ranks given for track events are within the athlete's heat only
- Q = Qualified for the next round
- q = Qualified for the next round as a fastest loser or, in field events, by position without achieving the qualifying target
- NR = National record
- N/A = Round not applicable for the event
- Bye = Athlete not required to compete in round

Track and road events

Athlete	Event	Final	
Athlete	Event	Result	Rank
Samuel Freire	Men's marathon	2:15:05	56

== Boxing ==
Cape Verde entered two boxers into the Olympic tournament. Daniel Varela de Pina (men's flyweight) secured his spot following the triumph in quota bouts round, at the 2024 World Olympic Qualification Tournament 2 in Bangkok, Thailand; meanwhile Ivanusa Moreira (women's welterweight) qualified for the games through the allocations of universality spots.

Athlete	Event	Round of 32	Round of 16	Quarterfinals	Semifinals	Final	
Athlete	Event	Opposition Result	Opposition Result	Opposition Result	Opposition Result	Opposition Result	Rank
Daniel Varela de Pina	Men's 51 kg	Bye	Panmod (THA); W 4–1	Chinyemba (ZAM); W 5–0	Dusmatov (UZB); L 0–5	Did not advance	3rd place, bronze medalist(s)
Ivanusa Moreira	Women's 66 kg	Bye	Derieuw (BEL); L 2–3	Did not advance			

== Fencing ==
Cape Verde entered one fencer into the Olympic competition. Victor Alvares secured his spot through receiving the tripartite invitation quotas, marking the country's debut in the sport.

Athlete	Event	Round of 64	Round of 32	Round of 16	Quarterfinal	Semifinal	Final / BM	
Athlete	Event	Opposition Score	Opposition Score	Opposition Score	Opposition Score	Opposition Score	Opposition Score	Rank
Victor Alvares de Oliveira	Men's foil	Gu (CAN); L 9–15	Did Not Advance					

== Judo ==
Cape Verde qualified one judoka for the following weight class at the Games. Djamila Silva (women's half-lightweight) got qualified via continental quota based on Olympic point rankings.

Athlete	Event	Round of 32	Round of 16	Quarterfinals	Semifinals	Repechage	Final / BM	
Athlete	Event	Opposition Result	Opposition Result	Opposition Result	Opposition Result	Opposition Result	Opposition Result	Rank
Djamila Silva	Women's –52 kg	Pimenta (BRA); L 00–10	Did not advance					

== Swimming ==
Cape Verde sent two swimmers to compete at the 2024 Paris Olympics, through the allocation of universality places.

Athlete	Event	Heat		Semifinal		Final	
Athlete	Event	Time	Rank	Time	Rank	Time	Rank
José Tati	Men's 50 m freestyle	26.66	59	Did not advance			
Jayla Pina	Women's 200 m medley	2:24.51 NR	33	Did not advance			
