= Cape Verde at the 2024 World Aquatics Championships =

- Flag of Cape Verde
- World Aquatics code: CPV
- National federation: Federeção Cabo-Verdiana de Natação

in Doha, Qatar
- Competitors: 2 in 1 sport
- Medals: Gold 0 Silver 0 Bronze 0 Total 0

World Aquatics Championships appearances
- 2019; 2022; 2023; 2024; 2025

Cape Verde competed at the 2024 World Aquatics Championships in Doha, Qatar from 2 to 18 February.

== Swimming ==
Cape Verdean swimmers competed in the following events.

Men

Athlete	Event	Heat		Semifinal		Final	
Athlete	Event	Time	Rank	Time	Rank	Time	Rank
Troy Pina	50 m freestyle	26.88	95	Did not advance			
Troy Pina	50 m butterfly	28.44	56	Did not advance			

Women

Athlete	Event	Heat		Semifinal		Final	
Athlete	Event	Time	Rank	Time	Rank	Time	Rank
La Troya Pina	50 m freestyle	30.61	87	Did not advance			
La Troya Pina	100 m breaststroke	1:25.17	52	Did not advance			
