= Cape Verde at the 2020 Summer Olympics =

- IOC code: CPV
- NOC: Comité Olímpico Caboverdeano

in Tokyo, Japan July 23, 2021 – August 8, 2021
- Competitors: 6 in 5 sports
- Flag bearers (opening): Jayla Pina; Jordin Andrade
- Flag bearer (closing): Daniel Varela de Pina
- Medals: Gold 0 Silver 0 Bronze 0 Total 0

Summer Olympics appearances (overview)
- 1996; 2000; 2004; 2008; 2012; 2016; 2020; 2024

Cape Verde competed at the 2020 Summer Olympics in Tokyo. Originally scheduled to take place from 24 July to 9 August 2020, the Games were postponed to 23 July to 8 August 2021, due to the COVID-19 pandemic. This was the nation's seventh appearance at the Olympics, since its debut in 1996.

== Competitors ==
The following is the list of number of competitors in the Games.

Sport	Men	Women	Total
Athletics	1	0	1
Boxing	1	0	1
Gymnastics	0	1	1
Judo	0	1	1
Swimming	1	1	2
Total	3	3	6

== Athletics ==
Cape Verde received a universality slot from the World Athletics to send a male athlete to the Olympics.

Key

- Note–Ranks given for track events are within the athlete's heat only
- Q = Qualified for the next round
- q = Qualified for the next round as a fastest loser or, in field events, by position without achieving the qualifying target
- NR = National record
- N/A = Round not applicable for the event
- Bye = Athlete not required to compete in round

Track & road events

Athlete	Event	Heat		Semifinal		Final	
Athlete	Event	Result	Rank	Result	Rank	Result	Rank
Jordin Andrade	Men's 400 m hurdles	50.64	7	Did not advance			

== Boxing ==
Cape Verde received an invitation from the Tripartite Commission and the IOC Boxing Task Force group to send the men's flyweight boxer David Daniel de Pina to the Olympics.

Athlete	Event	Round of 32	Round of 16	Quarterfinals	Semifinals	Final	
Athlete	Event	Opposition Result	Opposition Result	Opposition Result	Opposition Result	Opposition Result	Rank
Daniel Varela de Pina	Men's flyweight	Bye	Zoirov (UZB); L 0–5	Did not advance			

== Gymnastics ==
=== Rhythmic ===
Cape Verde received an invitation from the Tripartite Commission to send a rhythmic gymnast in the individual all-around competition to the Olympics.

Athlete	Event	Qualification						Final					
Athlete	Event	Hoop	Ball	Clubs	Ribbon	Total	Rank	Hoop	Ball	Clubs	Ribbon	Total	Rank
Márcia Lopes	Individual	7.550	13.200	12.550	9.550	42.850	26	Did not advance					

== Judo ==
Cape Verde qualified one judoka for the women's half-middleweight category (63 kg) at the Games. Sandrine Billiet accepted a continental berth from Africa as the nation's top-ranked judoka outside of direct qualifying position in the IJF World Ranking List of June 28, 2021.

Athlete	Event	Round of 32	Round of 16	Quarterfinals	Semifinals	Repechage	Final / BM	
Athlete	Event	Opposition Result	Opposition Result	Opposition Result	Opposition Result	Opposition Result	Opposition Result	Rank
Sandrine Billiet	Women's –63 kg	Khojieva (UZB); W 10–00	Agbegnenou (FRA); L 00–01	Did not advance				

== Swimming ==
For the first time in history, Cape Verde received a universality invitation from FINA to send two top-ranked swimmers (one per gender) in their respective individual events to the Olympics, based on the FINA Points System of June 28, 2021.

Athlete	Event	Heat		Semifinal		Final	
Athlete	Event	Time	Rank	Time	Rank	Time	Rank
Troy Pina	Men's 50 m freestyle	25.97	58	Did not advance			
Jayla Pina	Women's 100 m breaststroke	1:16.96	40	Did not advance			
