= Cape Verde at the 2020 Summer Paralympics =

- Flag of Cape Verde
- IPC code: CPV
- NPC: National Paralympic Committee Cape Verde

in Tokyo, Japan August 24, 2021 – September 5, 2021
- Competitors: 2 (1 man and 1 woman) in 1 sport
- Medals: Gold 0 Silver 0 Bronze 0 Total 0

Summer Paralympics appearances (overview)
- 2004; 2008; 2012; 2016; 2020; 2024

Cape Verde competed at the 2020 Summer Paralympics in Tokyo, Japan, from 24 August to 5 September 2021. This was their fifth consecutive appearance at the Summer Paralympics since 2004.

== Competitors ==
The following is the list of number of competitors participating in the Games:

Sport	Men	Women	Total
Athletics	1	1	2

== Athletics ==
Men's field

Athlete	Event	Final	
Athlete	Event	Result	Rank
Marilson Fernandes Semedo	Javelin throw F57	33.07	10

Women's track

Athlete	Event	Heats		Semi-final		Final	
Athlete	Event	Result	Rank	Result	Rank	Result	Rank
Keula Nidreia Pereira Semedo	100m T11	15.53	4	did not advance	did not advance	did not advance	did not advance
Keula Nidreia Pereira Semedo	200m T11	33.04	4	did not advance	did not advance	did not advance	did not advance

== See also ==
- Cape Verde at the Paralympics
- Cape Verde at the 2020 Summer Olympics
