= Cape Verde at the 2024 Summer Paralympics =

2024 sporting event delegation in Paris

- Flag of Cape Verde
- IPC code: CPV
- NPC: Comité Paralímpico de Cabo Verde

in Paris, France August 28, 2024 – September 8, 2024
- Competitors: 2 (1 man and 1 woman) in 1 sport
- Flag bearers: Marilson Fernandes Semedo; Heidilene Patricia Oliveira Lopes
- Medals: Gold 0 Silver 0 Bronze 0 Total 0

Summer Paralympics appearances (overview)
- 2004; 2008; 2012; 2016; 2020; 2024

Cape Verde or Cabo Verde, officially the Republic of Cabo Verde, competed at the 2024 Summer Paralympics in Paris, France, from 28 August to 8 September 2024.

== Competitors ==
The following is the list of number of competitors in the Games, including game-eligible alternates in team sports.

Sport	Men	Women	Total
Athletics	1	1	2
Total	1	1	2

== Athletics ==
Key

- Note–Ranks given for track events are within the athlete's heat only
- Q = Qualified for the next round
- q = Qualified for the next round as a fastest loser or, in field events, by position without achieving the qualifying target
- DQ = Disqualified
- PR = Paralympic Record
- AR = Area (or continental) Record
- NR = National Record
- SB = Season's Best
- N/A = Round not applicable for the event
- Bye = Athlete not required to compete in round

Field events
Men

Athlete	Event	Final	
Athlete	Event	Result	Rank
Marilson Fernandes Semedo	Javelin throw F57	39.97	9

Track & road events
Women

Athlete	Event	Heat		Final	
Athlete	Event	Result	Rank	Result	Rank
Heidilene Patricia Oliveira Lopes; Guide:Jailson Oliveira	100 metres T12	13.52	4	Did not advance	
Heidilene Patricia Oliveira Lopes; Guide:Jailson Oliveira	200 metres T12	28.49	4	Did not advance	

== See also ==
- Cape Verde at the 2024 Summer Olympics
- Cape Verde at the Paralympics
