= Márcia Lopes =

Cape Verdean rhythmic gymnast

- Full name: Márcia Alves Lopes
- Nickname: Marcinha
- Born: 6 December 2001 (age 24) São Vicente, Cape Verde

Gymnastics career
- Discipline: Rhythmic gymnastics
- Country represented: Cape Verde
- Club: Associacao de Ginastas de Sao Vicente
- Head coach: Jacqueline da Graca

Márcia Alves Lopes (born 6 December 2001) is a Cabo Verdean rhythmic gymnast who represented Cape Verde at the 2020 Summer Olympics. She was the first Cape Verdean athlete to qualify for the 2020 Olympic Games.

== Personal life ==
Márcia Alves Lopes was born on 6 December 2001, in São Vicente, Cape Verde, and she began rhythmic gymnastics when she was five years old. She speaks English, French, and Portuguese.

== Career ==
Lopes made her senior international debut at the 2017 World Championships in Pesaro, Italy. She finished 90th in the all-around during the qualification round with a total score of 30.200. She competed at the 2018 African Rhythmic Gymnastics Championships in Cairo, Egypt, where she finished 12th in the all-around with a total score of 28.600. She also finished sixth in the hoop final and eighth in both the ball and the clubs finals.

Lopes competed at the 2019 World Championships, where she finished 110th in the all-around during the qualification round. At the 2020 African Rhythmic Gymnastics Championships in Sharm el-Sheikh, Egypt, she finished eleventh in the all-around with a total score of 35.150. She also placed sixth in the ball final, eighth in the clubs final, and seventh in the ribbon final.

On 28 May 2021, Lopes received the tripartite invitation for the 2020 Olympic Games in Tokyo, Japan. She was the first Cape Verdean athlete to qualify for a 2020 Olympic spot. This was the fourth time that a Cape Verdean rhythmic gymnast competed in the Olympics after Wania Monteiro competed in 2004 and 2008, and Elyane Boal competed in 2016. She finished twenty-sixth in the qualification for the individual all-around.
