= Cape Verde at the 2000 Summer Olympics =

- The flag of Cape Verde
- IOC code: CPV
- NOC: Comité Olímpico Caboverdeano

in Sydney
- Competitors: 2 in 1 sport
- Flag bearer: Isménia do Frederico
- Medals: Gold 0 Silver 0 Bronze 0 Total 0

Summer Olympics appearances (overview)
- 1996; 2000; 2004; 2008; 2012; 2016; 2020; 2024

Cape Verde sent a delegation to compete at the 2000 Summer Olympics in Sydney, Australia from 15 September to 1 October 2000. This was Cape Verde's second appearance at a Summer Olympic Games after the 1996 Summer Olympics in Atlanta four years prior. The Cape Verdean delegation to Sydney consisted of two track and field athletes, Isménia do Frederico and António Zeferino, who were both making their second Olympic appearance. Do Frederico did not advance out of her heat in the women's 100 meters, while Zeferino finished 67th of 81 finishers in the men's marathon.

== Background ==
The Comité Olímpico Cabo-verdeano (Olympic Committee of Cape Verde) was recognized by the International Olympic Committee on 1 January 1993. Their first Summer Olympics were the 1996 Atlanta Olympics, where they sent 3 athletes, all in athletics. As of 2018, Cape Verde has never won an Olympic medal. The 2000 Summer Olympics were held from 15 September to 1 October 2000; a total of 10,651 athletes represented 199 National Olympic Committees. Sydney was their second appearance at an Olympic Games; the island nation has never participated at a Winter Olympic Games as of the 2018 Winter Olympics. The Cape Verdean delegation to Sydney consisted of two track and field athletes, Isménia do Frederico and António Zeferino. Do Frederico was chosen as the flag bearer for the opening ceremony.

== Competitors ==
The following is the list of number of competitors in the Games.

Sport	Men	Women	Total
Athletics	1	1	2
Total	1	1	2

== Athletics ==
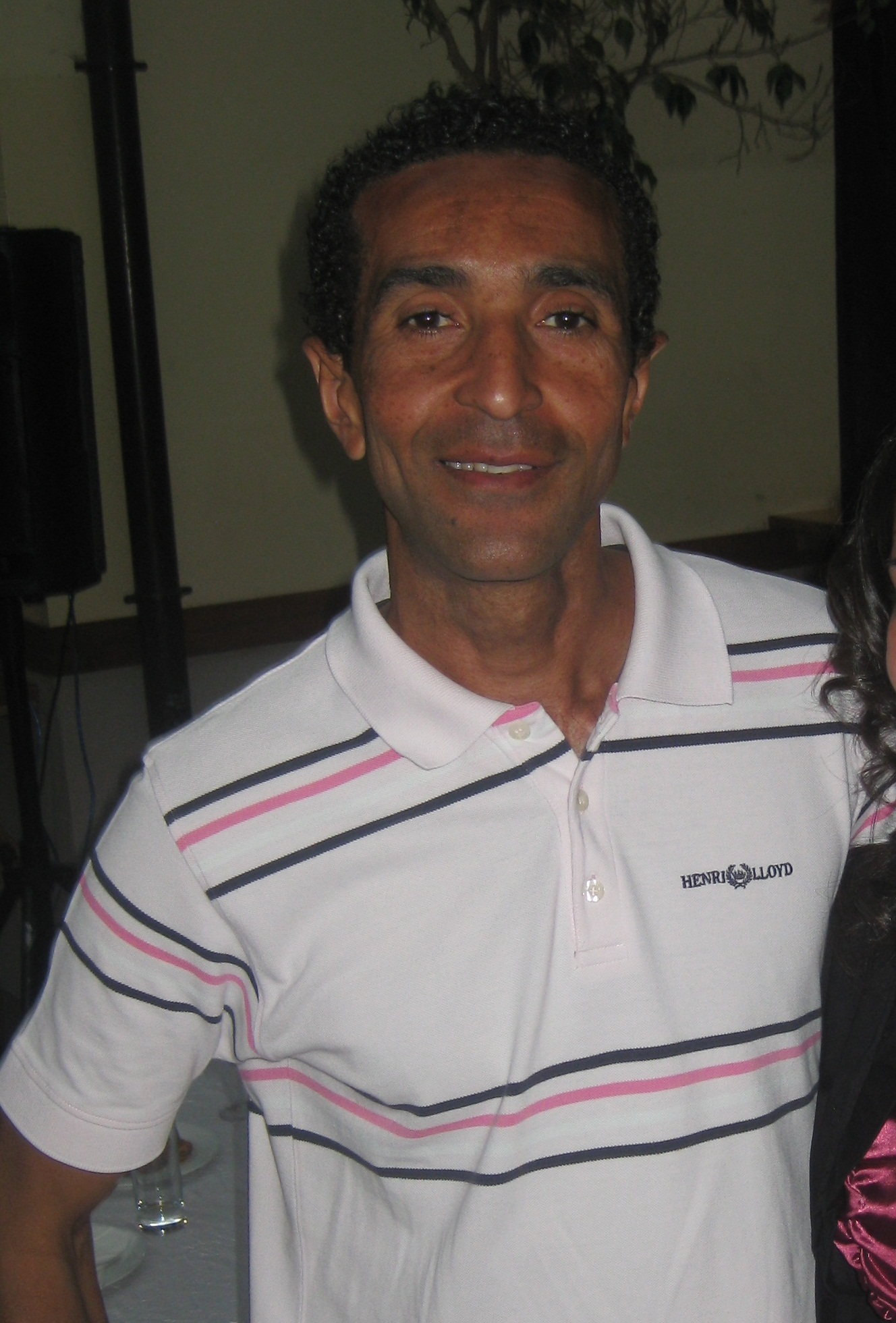
António Zeferino achieved his best finish in Sydney, out of three Olympic marathons raced.

Isménia do Frederico was 29 years old at the time of the Sydney Olympics, and was making her second and last Olympic appearance, having represented Cape Verde at the 1996 Summer Olympics. In the Atlanta 100 meters she placed last in her heat with a time of 13.03 seconds. Here in Sydney, in the 100 meters, she also finished last in her heat, but with a faster time of 12.99 seconds; only the top three from each heat, plus the next two fastest between all ten heats could advance, and so Frederico was eliminated. In the event overall, the gold medal is vacant due to original gold medalist Marion Jones of the United States admitting to steroid use and forfeiting her medals and results from the Sydney Games. Officially, the medals in the event are held by Ekaterini Thanou of Greece and Tayna Lawrence (the original bronze medalist) of Jamaica sharing silver, and Merlene Ottey, also of Jamaica, the original fourth-place finisher, being awarded a bronze. Gold was left vacant because Thanou, the original silver medalist, had her own issue with missing a drug test at the 2004 Summer Olympics

António Zeferino was 34 years old at the time of the Sydney Olympics, and was making the second of his three Olympic appearances. Four years prior, in the Atlanta marathon, he had finished with a time of 2 hours, 34 minutes and 13 seconds; and had ranked 94th out of 111 classified finishers. In the Sydney marathon, he finished with a time of 2 hours, 29 minutes and 46 seconds; which put him in 67th place out of 81 men who finished the race. The gold medal was won by Gezahegne Abera of Ethiopia in a time of 2 hours, 10 minutes and 11 seconds; silver was taken by Erick Wainaina of Kenya, and bronze was won by Tesfaye Tola, also of Ethiopia. Zeferino would go on to race the Olympic marathon again in the 2004 Summer Olympics, but Sydney was the highest finish and fastest race of his Olympic career.

Key

- Note–Ranks given for track events are within the athlete's heat only
- N/A = Round not applicable for the event

Athletes	Events	Heat Round 1		Heat Round 2		Semifinal		Final	
Athletes	Events	Time	Rank	Time	Rank	Time	Rank	Time	Rank
Isménia do Frederico	Women's 100 metres	12.99	8	did not advance					
António Zeferino	Men's marathon	N/A						2:29:46	67
