= Cape Verde at the 2022 World Aquatics Championships =

- Flag of Cape Verde
- FINA code: CPV
- National federation: Federeção Cabo-Verdiana de Natação

in Budapest, Hungary
- Competitors: 2 in 1 sport
- Medals: Gold 0 Silver 0 Bronze 0 Total 0

World Aquatics Championships appearances
- 2019; 2022; 2023; 2024

Cape Verde competed at the 2022 World Aquatics Championships in Budapest, Hungary from 18 June to 3 July.

== Swimming ==
Cape Verdean swimmers have achieved qualifying standards in the following events.

| Athlete | Event | Heat | | Semifinal | | Final | |
| Athlete | Event | Time | Rank | Time | Rank | Time | Rank |
|---|---|---|---|---|---|---|---|
| Troy Pina | Men's 50 m freestyle | 26.45 | 79 | did not advance | | | |
| Troy Pina | Men's 50 m butterfly | 27.33 | 62 | did not advance | | | |
| Jayla Pina | Women's 50 m breaststroke | 34.97 | 45 | did not advance | | | |
| Jayla Pina | Women's 100 m breaststroke | 1:18.02 | 48 | did not advance | | | |
