= Cape Verde at the 2019 World Aquatics Championships =

- Flag of Cape Verde
- FINA code: CPV
- National federation: Federeção Cabo-Verdiana de Natação

in Gwangju, South Korea
- Competitors: 3 in 1 sport
- Medals: Gold 0 Silver 0 Bronze 0 Total 0

World Aquatics Championships appearances
- 2019; 2022; 2023; 2024

Cape Verde competed at the 2019 World Aquatics Championships in Gwangju, South Korea from 12 to 28 July.

== Swimming ==
Cape Verde entered three swimmers.

Men

Athlete	Event	Heat		Semifinal		Final	
Athlete	Event	Time	Rank	Time	Rank	Time	Rank
Troy Pina	50 m freestyle	25.64	105	did not advance			
Troy Pina	50 m butterfly	27.68	75	did not advance			

Women

Athlete	Event	Heat		Semifinal		Final	
Athlete	Event	Time	Rank	Time	Rank	Time	Rank
Jayla Pina	50 m breaststroke	33.52	38	did not advance			
Jayla Pina	100 m breaststroke	1:16.00	44	did not advance			
Latroya Pina	50 m freestyle	29.34	74	did not advance			
Latroya Pina	100 m freestyle	1:03.88	=76	did not advance			
