= Cape Verde at the 2012 Summer Paralympics =

- IPC code: CPV
- NPC: Comité Caboverdeano Desp. Para Deficientes

in London
- Competitors: 1 in 1 sport
- Flag bearer: Marcio Fernandes
- Medals: Gold 0 Silver 0 Bronze 0 Total 0

Summer Paralympics appearances (overview)
- 2004; 2008; 2012; 2016; 2020; 2024

Cape Verde competed at the 2012 Summer Paralympics in London, United Kingdom from August 29 to September 9, 2012.

== Athletics ==
Men's track

Athlete	Event	Heat		Final	
Athlete	Event	Result	Rank	Result	Rank
Márcio Fernandes	100m T44	12.16	4	Did not advance	
Márcio Fernandes	200m T44	24.84	5	Did not advance	

Men's field

Athlete	Event	Final	
Athlete	Event	Distance	Rank
Márcio Fernandes	Javelin throw F44	46.04	9

== See also ==
- Cape Verde at the Paralympics
- Cape Verde at the 2012 Summer Olympics
