= Márcio Fernandes =

Márcio Fernandes may refer to:

- Márcio Fernandes (footballer) (born 1962), Brazilian football manager and former player
- Márcio Fernandes (athlete) (born 1983), Cape Verdean Paralympic athlete
