= Cape Verde at the 2008 Summer Paralympics =

- IPC code: CPV
- NPC: Comité Caboverdeano Desp. Para Deficientes

in Beijing
- Competitors: 1 in 1 sport
- Medals: Gold 0 Silver 0 Bronze 0 Total 0

Summer Paralympics appearances (overview)
- 2004; 2008; 2012; 2016; 2020; 2024

Cape Verde sent a delegation to compete at the 2008 Summer Paralympics in Beijing, People's Republic of China. Its sole athlete was Artimiza Sequeira who competed in technical disciplines of athletics. Cape Verde did not win a medal at these Games.

== Athletics ==
Women

| Athlete | Class | Event | Heats | | Semifinal | | Final | | |
| Athlete | Class | Event | Result | Rank | Result | Rank | Result | Points | Rank |
|---|---|---|---|---|---|---|---|---|---|
| Artimiza Sequeira | F42-46 (F42) | Shot put | N/A | | | | 5.61 | 601 | 9 |
| Artimiza Sequeira | F42-46 (F42) | Discus throw | N/A | | | | 17.83 | 586 | 8 |
| Artimiza Sequeira | F42-46 (F42) | Javelin throw | Did not start | | | | | | |

== See also ==
- Cape Verde at the Paralympics
- Cape Verde at the 2008 Summer Olympics
