= List of Cape Verdean records in swimming =

The Cape Verdean records in swimming are the fastest ever performances of swimmers from Cape Verde, which are recognised and ratified by the Federacao Cabo-verdiana de Natacao (FECAN).

All records were set in finals unless noted otherwise.

== Long Course (50 m) ==
=== Men ===
| Event | Time | | Name | Club | Date | Meet | Location | Ref |
|---|---|---|---|---|---|---|---|---|
| 50 m freestyle | 24.97 | h | Rohan Shrearer | CN Antibes | 23 May 2026 | Mare Nostrum | Monte Carlo, Monaco | |
| 100 m freestyle | 52.45 | h | Rohan Shrearer | Cape Verde | 30 July 2025 | World Championships | Singapore, Singapore | |
| 200 m freestyle | 1:54.70 | | Rohan Shrearer | Cape Verde | 6 May 2026 | African Championships | Oran, Algeria | |
| 400 m freestyle | 4:09.95 | h | Rohan Shrearer | CN Antibes | 20 March 2026 | Giant Open | Saint-Denis, France | |
| 800 m freestyle | | | | | | | | |
| 1500 m freestyle | | | | | | | | |
| 50 m backstroke | 28.66 | b, † | Rohan Shrearer | TAC Titans | 14 June 2025 | Tac Titans Triangle Classic | Cary, United States | |
| 100 m backstroke | 1:00.10 | d | Rohan Shrearer | TAC Titans | 12 July 2025 | NC Senior Championships | Cary, United States | |
| 200 m backstroke | | | | | | | | |
| 50 m breaststroke | 37.94 | h | Nehone Mendes | Cape Verde | 23 August 2022 | African Championships | Tunis, Tunisia | |
| 100 m breaststroke | 1:22.73 | h | Tiago Cardoso | Cape Verde | 30 April 2024 | African Championships | Luanda, Angola | |
| 200 m breaststroke | | | | | | | | |
| 50 m butterfly | 27.68 | h | Troy Pina | Cape Verde | 21 July 2019 | World Championships | Gwangju, South Korea | |
| 100 m butterfly | 1:02.29 | h | Troy Nestor Pina | Cape Verde | 11 September 2018 | African Championships | Algiers, Algeria | |
| 200 m butterfly | | | | | | | | |
| 200 m individual medley | | | | | | | | |
| 400 m individual medley | | | | | | | | |
| 4×100 m freestyle relay | | | | | | | | |
| 4×200 m freestyle relay | | | | | | | | |
| 4×100 m medley relay | | | | | | | | |

Legend: # – Record awaiting ratification by Fedaration Rwandaise de Natation Amateur; WR – World record; AF – African record; e – equalled existing record;
Records not set in finals: h – heat; sf – semifinal; r – relay 1st leg; rh – relay heat 1st leg; b – B final; † – en route to final mark; so – swim-off; tt – time trial

=== Women ===
| Event | Time | | Name | Club | Date | Meet | Location | Ref |
|---|---|---|---|---|---|---|---|---|
| 50 m freestyle | 26.12 | h | Wilina Jules-marthe | Cape Verde | 23 August 2025 | World Junior Championships | Otopeni, Romania | |
| 100 m freestyle | 1:03.55 | h | Fatima Jayla | Cape Verde | 10 September 2018 | African Championships | Algiers, Algeria | |
| 200 m freestyle | 2:27.77 | h | Catarina Trigo | Cape Verde | 11 September 2018 | African Championships | Algiers, Algeria | |
| 400 m freestyle | 5:14.24 | h | Catarina Trigo | Cape Verde | 12 September 2018 | African Championships | Algiers, Algeria | |
| 800 m freestyle | | | | | | | | |
| 1500 m freestyle | | | | | | | | |
| 50 m backstroke | 29.73 | h | Wilina Jules-marthe | Cape Verde | 22 August 2025 | World Junior Championships | Otopeni, Romania | |
| 100 m backstroke | 1:06.24 | h | Wilina Jules-marthe | Hac Natation Seine Metropole | 19 July 2025 | Open d'Ete | Poitiers, France | |
| 200 m backstroke | | | | | | | | |
| 50 m breaststroke | 33.26 | h | Jayla Pina | Cape Verde | 2 August 2025 | World Championships | Singapore, Singapore | |
| 100 m breaststroke | 1:14.05 | h | Jayla Pina | Cape Verde | 30 April 2024 | African Championships | Luanda, Angola | |
| 200 m breaststroke | 2:41.75 | h | Jayla Pina | Cape Verde | 27 July 2023 | World Championships | Fukuoka, Japan | |
| 50 m butterfly | 30.86 | h | Wilina Jules-Marthe | Cape Verde | 30 April 2024 | African Championships | Luanda, Angola | |
| 100 m butterfly | | | | | | | | |
| 200 m butterfly | | | | | | | | |
| 200 m individual medley | 2:24.51 | h | Jayla Pina | Cape Verde | 2 August 2024 | Olympic Games | Paris, France | |
| 400 m individual medley | | | | | | | | |
| 4×100 m freestyle relay | | | | | | | | |
| 4×200 m freestyle relay | | | | | | | | |
| 4×100 m medley relay | | | | | | | | |

Legend: # – Record awaiting ratification by Federacao Cabo-verdiana de Natacao; WR – World record; AF – African record; e – equalled existing record;
Records not set in finals: h – heat; sf – semifinal; r – relay 1st leg; rh – relay heat 1st leg; b – B final; † – en route to final mark; so – swim-off; tt – time trial

=== Mixed ===
| Event | Time | | Name | Club | Date | Meet | Location | Ref |
|---|---|---|---|---|---|---|---|---|
| 4×100 m freestyle relay | 3:53.70 | h | Jose Tati (57.60); Jayla Pina (59.09); Kaila Dacruz (1:04.54); Rohan Shearer (52.47) | Cape Verde | 2 August 2025 | World Championships | Singapore, Singapore | |
| 4×100 m medley relay | 4:37.11 | h | La Troya Pina (1:16.55); Jayla Pina (1:14.28); Troy Pina (1:06.82); Ailton Lima (59.46) | Cape Verde | 26 July 2023 | World Championships | Fukuoka, Japan | |

Legend: # – Record awaiting ratification by Federacao Cabo-verdiana de Natacao; WR – World record; AF – African record; e – equalled existing record;
Records not set in finals: h – heat; sf – semifinal; r – relay 1st leg; rh – relay heat 1st leg; b – B final; † – en route to final mark; so – swim-off; tt – time trial

== Short Course (25 m) ==
=== Men ===
| Event | Time | | Name | Club | Date | Meet | Location | Ref |
|---|---|---|---|---|---|---|---|---|
| 50 m freestyle | 25.61 | h | Troy Pina | Cape Verde | 18 December 2021 | World Championships | Abu Dhabi, United Arab Emirates | |
| 100 m freestyle | | | | | | | | |
| 200 m freestyle | | | | | | | | |
| 400 m freestyle | | | | | | | | |
| 800 m freestyle | | | | | | | | |
| 1500 m freestyle | | | | | | | | |
| 50 m backstroke | | | | | | | | |
| 100 m backstroke | | | | | | | | |
| 200 m backstroke | | | | | | | | |
| 50 m breaststroke | | | | | | | | |
| 100 m breaststroke | | | | | | | | |
| 200 m breaststroke | | | | | | | | |
| 50 m butterfly | 26.73 | h | Troy Pina | Cape Verde | 14 December 2018 | World Championships | Hangzhou, China | |
| 100 m butterfly | 59.18 | h | Troy Pina | Cape Verde | 12 December 2018 | World Championships | Hangzhou, China | |
| 200 m butterfly | | | | | | | | |
| 200 m individual medley | | | | | | | | |
| 400 m individual medley | | | | | | | | |
| 4×100 m freestyle relay | | | | | | | | |
| 4×200 m freestyle relay | | | | | | | | |
| 4×100 m medley relay | | | | | | | | |

Legend: # – Record awaiting ratification by Federacao Cabo-verdiana de Natacao; WR – World record; AF – African record; e – equalled existing record;
Records not set in finals: h – heat; sf – semifinal; r – relay 1st leg; rh – relay heat 1st leg; b – B final; † – en route to final mark; so – swim-off; tt – time trial

=== Women ===
| Event | Time | | Name | Club | Date | Meet | Location | Ref |
|---|---|---|---|---|---|---|---|---|
| 50 m freestyle | 25.56 | h | Wilina Jules-marthe | HAC Natation Seine Métropole | 31 October 2026 | French Championships | Angers, France | |
| 100 m freestyle | 1:05.25 | h | Catarina Ferreira | Cape Verde | 12 December 2018 | World Championships | Hangzhou, China | |
| 200 m freestyle | | | | | | | | |
| 400 m freestyle | | | | | | | | |
| 800 m freestyle | | | | | | | | |
| 1500 m freestyle | | | | | | | | |
| 50 m backstroke | 28.22 | c | Wilina Jules-marthe | HAC Natation Seine Métropole | 29 October 2026 | French Championships | Angers, France | |
| 100 m backstroke | | | | | | | | |
| 200 m backstroke | | | | | | | | |
| 50m breaststroke | 35.59 | h, † | Latroya Pina | Cape Verde | 14 December 2018 | World Championships | Hangzhou, China | |
| 100m breaststroke | 1:16.83 | h | Latroya Pina | Cape Verde | 14 December 2018 | World Championships | Hangzhou, China | |
| 200 m breaststroke | | | | | | | | |
| 50m butterfly | 27.93 | c | Wilina Jules-marthe | HAC Natation Seine Métropole | 30 October 2026 | French Championships | Angers, France | |
| 100 m butterfly | | | | | | | | |
| 200 m butterfly | | | | | | | | |
| 100m individual medley | 1:09.99 | h | Latroya Pina | Cape Verde | 13 December 2018 | World Championships | Hangzhou, China | |
| 200 m individual medley | | | | | | | | |
| 400 m individual medley | | | | | | | | |
| 4×100 m freestyle relay | | | | | | | | |
| 4×200 m freestyle relay | | | | | | | | |
| 4×100 m medley relay | | | | | | | | |

Legend: # – Record awaiting ratification by Federacao Cabo-verdiana de Natacao; WR – World record; AF – African record; e – equalled existing record;
Records not set in finals: h – heat; sf – semifinal; r – relay 1st leg; rh – relay heat 1st leg; b – B final; † – en route to final mark; so – swim-off; tt – time trial
