= Cape Verde at the 2004 Summer Olympics =

- IOC code: CPV
- NOC: Cape Verdean Olympic Committee

in Athens
- Competitors: 3 in 3 sports
- Flag bearer: Wania Monteiro
- Medals: Gold 0 Silver 0 Bronze 0 Total 0

Summer Olympics appearances (overview)
- 1996; 2000; 2004; 2008; 2012; 2016; 2020; 2024

Cape Verde was represented at the 2004 Summer Olympics in Athens, Greece by the Cape Verdean Olympic Committee.

In total, three athletes including two men and one woman represented Cape Verde in three different sports including athletics, boxing and gymnastics.

== Competitors ==
In total, three athletes represented Cape Verde at the 2004 Summer Olympics in Athens, Greece across three different sports.

Sport	Men	Women	Total
Athletics	1	0	1
Boxing	1	–	1
Gymnastics	0	1	1
Total	2	1	3

== Athletics ==
In total, one Cape Verdean athlete participated in the athletics events – António Zeferino in the men's marathon.

Most of the athletics events took place at the Athens Olympic Stadium in Marousi, Athens from 18 to 29 August 2004. The men's and women's marathons took place at the Panathenaic Stadium in Pangrati, Athens.

The men's marathon took place on 29 August 2004. Zeferino completed the course in a time of two hours 36 minutes 22 seconds to finish in 78th place overall.

Athlete	Event	Final	
Athlete	Event	Result	Rank
António Zeferino	Marathon	2:36:22	78

== Boxing ==
In total, one Cape Verdean athlete participated in the boxing events – Flavio Furtado in the light heavyweight category.

The boxing events took place at the Peristeri Olympic Boxing Hall in Peristeri, Athens from 14 to 29 August 2004.

The first round of the light heavyweight category took place on 14 August 2004. Furtado lost to Trevor Stewardson of Canada and was eliminated from the competition.

Athlete	Event	Round of 32	Round of 16	Quarterfinals	Semifinals	Final	
Athlete	Event	Opposition Result	Opposition Result	Opposition Result	Opposition Result	Opposition Result	Rank
Flavio Furtado	Light heavyweight	Stewardson (CAN); L 20–36	did not advance				

== Gymnastics ==
In total, one Cape Verdean athlete participated in the gymnastic events – Wania Monteiro in the rhythmic individual all-around.

The rhythmic gymnastic events took place at Galatsi Olympic Hall in Galatsi, Athens from 26 to 29 August 2004.

The qualifying round of the rhythmic individual all-around took place on 26 and 27 August 2004. Monteiro scored 18.05 with the hoop, 18.55 with the ball, 18.4 with the clubs and 16.9 with the ribbon for a combined total of 71.9 points and was ranked 24th overall. She did not advance to the final.

Athlete	Event	Qualification						Final					
Athlete	Event	Rope	Hoop	Clubs	Ribbon	Total	Rank	Rope	Hoop	Clubs	Ribbon	Total	Rank
Wania Monteiro	Individual	18.050	18.550	18.400	16.900	71.900	24	did not advance					

== See also ==
- Cape Verde at the 2004 Summer Paralympics
