= Cape Verde at the 2008 Summer Olympics =

- IOC code: CPV
- NOC: Comité Olímpico Caboverdeano

in Beijing
- Competitors: 2 in 2 sports
- Flag bearer: Wania Monteiro
- Medals: Gold 0 Silver 0 Bronze 0 Total 0

Summer Olympics appearances (overview)
- 1996; 2000; 2004; 2008; 2012; 2016; 2020; 2024; 2028

Cape Verde competed at the 2008 Summer Olympics in Beijing, China. Their participation marked their fourth Olympic appearance. Two Cape Verdeans competed in the Olympic games: Nelson Cruz participated as a marathon runner, and Wania Monteiro participated in gymnastics. Another athlete, Lenira Santos, was selected to compete in athletics but was forced to pull out due to injury. Monteiro was selected as the flag bearer for both the opening and closing ceremonies. Neither of the Cape Verdeans progressed beyond the first round.

== Background ==
Cape Verde had participated in three previous Summer Olympics, between its debut in the 1996 Summer Olympics in Atlanta, United States and the 2008 Summer Olympics in Beijing. At their debut, the country sent three athletes to the games, all in athletics. The most number of Cape Verde athletes participating in a summer games, is three in 1996, 2004 and 2012. No Cape Verde athlete has ever progressed out of the first round. Two athletes from Cape Verde were selected to compete in the 2008 games; Nelson Cruz in the men's marathon and Wania Monteiro in the women's all-round gymnastics.

== Athletics ==
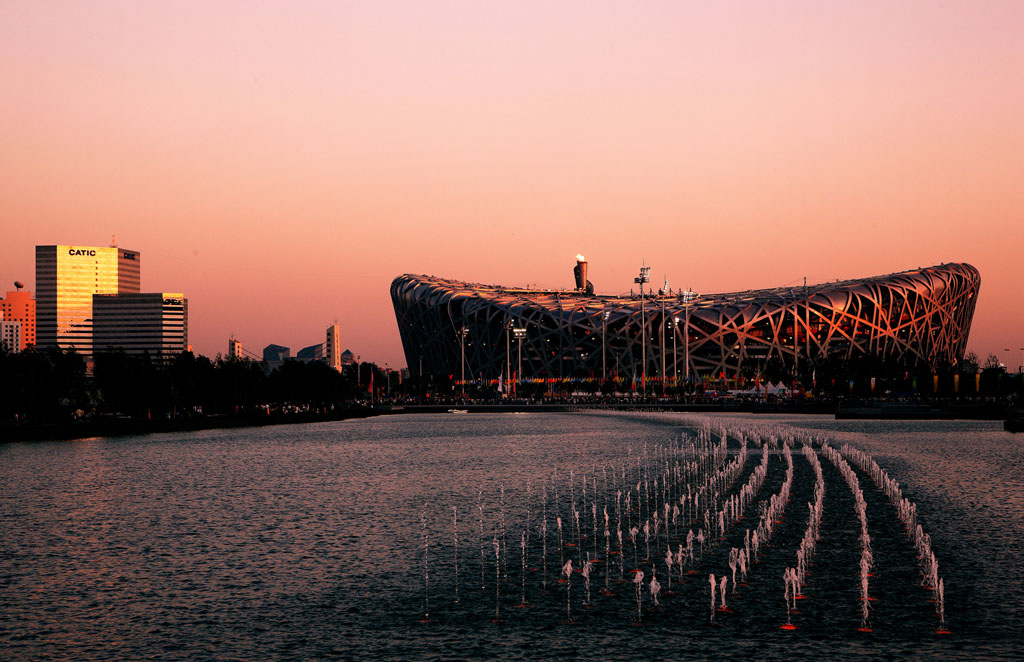
The Beijing National Stadium, where the marathon that Cruz competed in finished

Cape Verde was represented by one athlete at the 2008 Olympics in athletics. This person was Nelson Cruz a marathon runner. It was Cruz's Olympic debut but he had competed in two IAAF World Championships, in 2005 and in 2007. He competed on the 24 August in Beijing, and finished 48th out of 95 (Note: 19 of the 95 athletes did not finish.) in a time of 2 hours, 23 minutes and 47 seconds, more than 17 minutes behind the winner, Samuel Kamau Wanjiru.

Athlete	Event	Final	
Athlete	Event	Result	Rank
Nelson Cruz	Men's marathon	2:23:47	48

== Gymnastics ==
=== Rhythmic ===
In the sport of rhythmic gymnastics, Cape Verde was represented by Wania Monteiro, who competed in the individual all-round. The Beijing Olympics was Monteiro second Olympic Games after competing in the individual all-round in 2004. In 2008 Montero finished last in the qualifying round, with a score of 49.050 points.

Athlete	Event	Qualification						Final					
Athlete	Event	Rope	Hoop	Clubs	Ribbon	Total	Rank	Rope	Hoop	Clubs	Ribbon	Total	Rank
Wania Monteiro	Women's individual	12.275	13.025	12.325	11.425	49.050	24	Did not advance					

== See also ==
- List of flag bearers for Cape Verde at the Olympics
