= Cape Verde at the 2016 Summer Olympics =

- IOC code: CPV
- NOC: Comité Olímpico Caboverdeano

in Rio de Janeiro
- Competitors: 5 in 4 sports
- Flag bearer: Maria Andrade
- Medals: Gold 0 Silver 0 Bronze 0 Total 0

Summer Olympics appearances (overview)
- 1996; 2000; 2004; 2008; 2012; 2016; 2020; 2024

Cape Verde competed at the 2016 Summer Olympics in Rio de Janeiro, Brazil, from 5 to 21 August 2016. The nation's participation in Rio de Janeiro marked its sixth appearance at the Summer Olympics since its debut in 1996.

Cape Verdean Olympic Committee (Portuguese: Comité Olímpico Caboverdeano) sent the nation's largest delegation to the Games, overhauling the record by two more athletes than in Atlanta, Athens, and London. A total of five athletes, two men and three women, were selected to the team across four different sports, with sprinter Lidiane Lopes returning for her second appearance from London 2012. Maria Andrade, who became Cape Verde's first taekwondo fighter at the Games, led her team as the nation's flag bearer in the opening ceremony. Apart from taekwondo as the nation's Olympic debut, Cape Verde also staged its comeback in boxing and rhythmic gymnastics.

Cape Verde, however, has yet to win its first Olympic medal. Hurdler Jordin Andrade was the only Cape Verdean athlete to produce a best finish for the team at the Games, placing sixth with a national record in the semifinal heat of the men's 400 m hurdles.

== Athletics (track and field) ==
Cape Verdean athletes achieved qualifying standards in the following athletics events (up to a maximum of 3 athletes in each event):

Key

- Note–Ranks given for track events are within the athlete's heat only
- Q = Qualified for the next round
- q = Qualified for the next round as a fastest loser or, in field events, by position without achieving the qualifying target
- NR = National record
- N/A = Round not applicable for the event
- Bye = Athlete not required to compete in round

Track & road events

| Athlete | Event | Heat | | Quarterfinal | | Semifinal | | Final | |
| Athlete | Event | Result | Rank | Result | Rank | Result | Rank | Result | Rank |
|---|---|---|---|---|---|---|---|---|---|
| Jordin Andrade | Men's 400 m hurdles | 49.35 | 4 q | —N/a | | 49.32 | 6 | did not advance | |
| Lidiane Lopes | Women's 100 m | 12.38 NR | 4 | did not advance | | | | | |

== Boxing ==
Cape Verde entered one boxer to compete in the men's super heavyweight division into the Olympic competition for the second time (first being in 2004). Davilson Morais had received an unused Olympic spot in the men's super heavyweight division as the next highest-ranked boxer, after Tunisia made its decision to decline a berth won by Aymen Trabelsi at the 2016 African Qualification Tournament.

| Athlete | Event | Round of 32 | Round of 16 | Quarterfinals | Semifinals | Final | |
| Athlete | Event | Opposition Result | Opposition Result | Opposition Result | Opposition Result | Opposition Result | Rank |
|---|---|---|---|---|---|---|---|
| Davilson Morais | Men's super heavyweight | Bye | Joyce (GBR); L TKO | did not advance | | | |

== Gymnastics ==
=== Rhythmic ===
Cape Verde received an invitation from the Tripartite Commission to send a rhythmic gymnast in the individual all-around, marking the nation's Olympic return to the sport for the third time in history (the first and second being in 2004 and 2008, respectively).

| Athlete | Event | Qualification | | | | | | Final | | | | | |
| Athlete | Event | Hoop | Ball | Clubs | Ribbon | Total | Rank | Hoop | Ball | Clubs | Ribbon | Total | Rank |
|---|---|---|---|---|---|---|---|---|---|---|---|---|---|
| Elyane Boal | Individual | 9.833 | 10.033 | 9.991 | 8.783 | 38.640 | 26 | did not advance | | | | | |

== Taekwondo ==
Cape Verde entered one athlete into the taekwondo competition for the first time at the Olympics. Maria Andrade secured a spot in the women's flyweight category (49 kg) by virtue of her top two finish at the 2016 African Qualification Tournament in Agadir, Morocco.

| Athlete | Event | Round of 16 | Quarterfinals | Semifinals | Repechage | Final / BM | |
| Athlete | Event | Opposition Result | Opposition Result | Opposition Result | Opposition Result | Opposition Result | Rank |
|---|---|---|---|---|---|---|---|
| Maria Andrade | Women's −49 kg | Wongpattanakit (THA); L 6–18 PTG | did not advance | | | | |
