= Cape Verde at the Paralympics =

- IPC code: CPV
- NPC: Comité Caboverdeano Desp. Para Deficientes
- Medals: Gold 0 Silver 0 Bronze 1 Total 1

Summer appearances
- 2004; 2008; 2012; 2016; 2020; 2024

Cape Verde made its Paralympic Games début at the 2004 Summer Paralympics in Athens, with two competitors in track and field, and one in powerlifting. The country sent a single athlete (Artimiza Sequeira) to the 2008 Games, to compete in the women's shot put, discus and javelin.

In Rio de Janeiro 2016, sprinter Gracelino Barbosa won Cape Verde's first Paralympic medal, a bronze in the Men's 400m T20.

Cape Verde has never taken part in the Winter Paralympics.

== Medal tables ==
=== Medals by Summer Games ===
Games	Athletes	Gold	Silver	Bronze	Total	Rank
2004 Athens	3	0	0	0	0	-
2008 Beijing	1	0	0	0	0	-
2012 London	1	0	0	0	0	-
2016 Rio de Janeiro	2	0	0	1	1	78
2020 Tokyo	2	0	0	0	0	-
2024 Paris	Future Event					
2028 Los Angeles	Future Event					
2032 Brisbane	Future Event					
Total		0	0	1	1	124

=== Medals by Summer sport ===
Sport	Gold	Silver	Bronze	Total
Athletics	0	0	1	1
Totals (1 entries)	0	0	1	1

== See also ==
- Cape Verde at the Olympics
