= 2010–2012 CAVB Beach Volleyball Continental Cup =

Teams will compete in the sub-zonal tournaments, with all teams advancing, with each team carrying over the points it earns to the five zonal tournament, where teams not entered in the sub-zonal tournaments can enter. The top four teams in each group will advance to the second zonal round where teams are mixed. The top 2 teams from the second zonal round will advance to the continental cup. The winner of the 2010–12 Continental Beach Volleyball Cup will advance to the Olympics 42 out of a 53 possible nations entered.

== Men ==
=== Sub-zonal ===
==== Group A ====
- Host: Dakar, Senegal
- Dates: January 8–10, 2011

Quarterfinals
The Gambia
BYE
Senegal
BYE
January 8
Mauritania	0
Cape Verde	4
Guinea-Bissau
BYE

Semifinals
January 8
The Gambia	0
Senegal	4
January 9
Cape Verde	4
Guinea-Bissau	0

Final
January 9
Senegal	3
Cape Verde	2
Third place
January 9
The Gambia	3
Guinea-Bissau	1

4th place match
January 9
Mauritania	0
Guinea-Bissau	4

- Host: Freetown, Sierra Leone
- Dates: January 14–15, 2011

Semifinals
January 14
Sierra Leone	3
Liberia	1
January 14
Morocco	4
Guinea	0

Final
January 15
Sierra Leone	0
Morocco	4
Third place
January 15
Guinea	0
Liberia	4

==== Group B ====
- Host: Cotonou, Benin
- Dates: January 30–31, 2010

Semi-finals
30 October
Benin	0
Nigeria	4
30 October
Niger	3
Algeria	2

Final
31 October
Nigeria	3
Niger	1
Third place
31 October
Benin	1
Algeria	3

- Host: Lome, Togo
- Dates: November 5–7, 2010

Semifinals
November 6
Burkina Faso	0
Togo	4
November 6
Ivory Coast	3
Ghana	2

Final
November 6
Togo	4
Ivory Coast	0
Third place
November 6
Burkina Faso	1
Ghana	3

==== Group C ====
- Host: Douala, Cameroon
- Dates: January 27–29, 2011

Semi-finals
January 27/28
Gabon	1
Libya	3
January 27/28
Central African Republic	3
Cameroon	2

Final
January 29
Libya	4
Central African Republic	0
Third place
January 28
Gabon	0
Cameroon	4

==== Group D ====
- Host: Gisenyi, Rwanda
- Dates: December 2–4, 2010

Semifinals
December 2
Kenya	4
Uganda	0
December 2
Burundi	0
Rwanda	4

Final
December 4
Kenya	0
Rwanda	4
Third place
December 4
Uganda	0
Burundi	4

- Host: Khartoum, Sudan
- Dates: December 24–25, 2010

Team	Pld	W	L	MF	MA	Pts
Egypt	2	2	0	7	1	4
Sudan	2	1	1	4	4	3
Djibouti	2	0	2	1	7	2

	DJI	EGY	SUD
Djibouti		0–4	1–3
Egypt	4–0		3–1
Sudan	3–1	1–3	

==== Group E ====
- Host: Windhoek, Namibia
- Dates: January 21–23, 2011

Team	Pld	W	L	MF	MA	Pts
South Africa	2	2	0	8	0	4
Namibia	2	1	1	4	4	3
Zambia	2	0	2	0	8	2

	NAM	RSA	ZAM
Namibia		0–4	4–0
South Africa	4–0		4–0
Zambia	0–4	0–4	

- Host: Maputo, Mozambique
- Dates: February 4–6, 2011

Team	Pld	W	L	MF	MA	Pts
Mozambique	2	2	0	8	0	4
Swaziland	2	1	1	3	5	3
Zimbabwe	2	0	2	1	7	2

	MOZ	SWZ	ZIM
Mozambique		4–0	4–0
Swaziland	0–4		3–1
Zimbabwe	0–4	1–3	

=== Zonal round 1 ===
Countries that didn't participate from the sub-zonal round are able to participate. The top 4 countries advance to the next round.

The following countries withdrew after playing in the sub-zonal round.

- Burkina Faso
- Cameroon
- Central African Republic
- Djibouti
- Libya
- Mauritania
- Senegal
- Zambia

The following countries entered without playing in the sub-zonal round.

- Angola
- Republic of the Congo
- Democratic Republic of the Congo
- Ethiopia
- Mauritius
- Tanzania

==== Group A ====
- Host: Freetown, Sierra Leone
- Dates: July 3–5, 2011

Quarterfinals
July 3
Morocco	2
Guinea	0
July 3
Guinea-Bissau	0
The Gambia	2
July 3
Sierra Leone	0
Liberia	3
Cape Verde
BYE

Semifinals
July 4
Morocco	2
The Gambia	0
July 4
Liberia	0
Cape Verde	2

Final
July 4
Morocco	2
Cape Verde	0
Third place
July 4
The Gambia	2
Liberia	1

Losers' bracket

Semifinals
July 5
Guinea	2
Guinea-Bissau	0
Sierra Leone
BYE

5th place match
July 5
Guinea	2
Sierra Leone	1

- Morocco, Cape Verde, The Gambia and Liberia advanced to the next round.

==== Group B ====
- Host: Ghana
- Dates: August 16–18, 2011

Quarterfinals
August 16
Nigeria	4
Benin	0
August 16
Algeria	4
Niger	0
August 16
Ivory Coast	0
Ghana	4
Togo
BYE

Semifinals
August 17
Nigeria	4
Algeria	0
August 16
Ghana	4
Togo	0

Final
August 18
Nigeria	3
Ghana	2
Third place
August 17
Algeria	4
Togo	0

Losers' bracket

Semifinals
August 17
Benin	0
Niger	4
Ivory Coast
BYE

5th place match
August 17
Niger	3
Ivory Coast	2

- Nigeria, Ghana, Algeria and Togo advanced to the next round.

==== Group C ====
- Host: Libreville, Gabon
- Dates: August 5–7, 2011

Semifinals
August 6
Gabon	1
Republic of the Congo	3
August 6
Democratic Republic of the Congo	0
Angola	4

Final
August 7
Republic of the Congo	0
Angola	4
Third place
August 7
Gabon	3
Democratic Republic of the Congo	1

- Angola, Republic of the Congo, Gabon and Democratic Republic of the Congo advanced to the next round.

==== Group D ====
- Host: Mombasa, Kenya
- Dates: July 27–29, 2011

Quarterfinals
July 27
Rwanda	2
Tanzania	0
July 27
Burundi	4
Sudan	0
July 27
Egypt	3
Uganda	1
July 27
Ethiopia	0
Kenya	4

Semifinals
July 28
Rwanda	3
Burundi	2
July 28
Egypt	1
Kenya	3

Final
July 29
Rwanda	0
Kenya	4
Third place
July 29
Burundi	2
Egypt	3

Losers' bracket

Semifinals
July 28
Tanzania	3
Sudan	2
July 28
Uganda	4
Ethiopia	0

5th place match
July 29
Tanzania	0
Uganda	4
7th place match
July 29
Sudan	0
Ethiopia	4

- Kenya, Rwanda, Egypt and Burundi advanced to the next round.

==== Group E ====
- Host: Maputo, Mozambique
- Dates: July 15–17, 2011

Quarterfinals
South Africa
BYE
July 15
Zimbabwe	3
Namibia	2
July 15
Swaziland	0
Mauritius	4
Mozambique
BYE

Semifinals
July 16
South Africa	3
Zimbabwe	2
July 16
Mauritius	0
Mozambique	4

Final
July 17
South Africa	2
Mozambique	0
Third place
July 17
Zimbabwe	1
Mauritius	2

5th place match
July 17
Namibia	2
Swaziland	0

- South Africa, Mozambique, Mauritius and Zimbabwe advanced to the next round.

=== Zonal round 2 ===
The top 2 of each pool qualifies to the African Continental Beach Volleyball Cup.

The following countries withdrew

- Cape Verde
- Gabon
- Ghana
- Kenya
- Liberia
- Mozambique
- Zimbabwe

==== Pool 1 ====
- Host: Congo
- Dates: October 21–23, 2011

Team	Pld	W	L	MF	MA	Pts
Republic of the Congo	1	1	0	4	0	2
Mauritius	1	0	1	0	4	1

	CGO	MRI
Republic of the Congo		4–0
Mauritius	0–4	

==== Pool 2 ====
- Host: Agadir, Morocco
- Dates: October 11–12, 2011

Team	Pld	W	L	MF	MA	Pts
Morocco	2	2	0	7	1	4
Algeria	2	1	1	4	4	3
Rwanda	2	0	2	1	7	2

	ALG	MAR	RWA
Algeria		0–4	4–0
Morocco	4–0		3–1
Rwanda	0–4	1–3	

==== Pool 3 ====
- Host: Tomé, Togo
- Dates: October 14–16, 2011

Semifinals
October 15
South Africa	4
Democratic Republic of the Congo	0
October 15
Egypt	3
Togo	1

Final
October 16
South Africa	4
Egypt	0
Third place
October 16
Democratic Republic of the Congo	1
Togo	3

- South Africa and Egypt advanced to the finals.

==== Pool 4 ====
- Host: Abuja, Nigeria
- Dates: October 28–30, 2011

Semifinals
October 28
Angola	4
The Gambia	0
October 28
Nigeria	4
Burundi	0

Final
October 30
Angola	3
Nigeria	2
Third place
October 30
The Gambia	1
Burundi	3

- Angola and Nigeria advanced to the finals.

=== Continental final ===
The following teams have qualified for the men's continental final.

- Algeria
- Angola
- Republic of the Congo
- Egypt
- Mauritius
- Morocco
- Nigeria
- South Africa

== Women ==
=== Sub-zonal ===
==== Group A ====
- Host: Dakar, Senegal
- Dates: January 8–10, 2011

Final
January 9
Senegal	4
Guinea-Bissau	0

- Host: Freetown, Sierra Leone
- Dates: January 14–15, 2011

Semifinals
January 14
Sierra Leone	4
Liberia	0
January 14
Morocco	4
Guinea	0

Final
January 15
Sierra Leone	0
Morocco	4
Third place
January 15
Liberia	0
Guinea	4

==== Group B ====
- Host: Cotonou, Benin
- Dates: October 30–31, 2010

Semifinals
October 30
Benin	1
Nigeria	3
October 30
Niger	0
Algeria	4

Final
October 31
Nigeria	2
Algeria	3
Third place
October 31
Benin	0
Niger	4

- Host: Tomé, Togo
- Dates: November 5–6, 2010

Semifinals
Togo
BYE
November 6
Ivory Coast	1
Ghana	3

Final
November 6
Togo	0
Ghana	4
Third place
Ivory Coast
BYE

==== Group C ====
- Host: Douala, Cameroon
- Dates: January 27–29, 2011

Final
January 28
Cameroon	4
Gabon	0

==== Group D ====
- Host: Gisenyi, Rwanda
- Dates: December 2–4, 2010

Semifinals
December 2
Kenya	4
Uganda	0
December 2
Burundi	0
Rwanda	4

Final
December 3
Kenya	4
Rwanda	0
Third place
December 3
Uganda	4
Burundi	0

==== Group E ====
- Host: Windhoek, Namibia
- Dates: January 21–23, 2011

Team	Pld	W	L	MF	MA	Pts
Mauritius	2	2	0	7	1	4
South Africa	2	1	1	5	3	3
Namibia	2	0	2	0	8	2

	MRI	NAM	RSA
Mauritius		4–0	3–1
Namibia	0–4		0–4
South Africa	1–3	4–0	

- Host: Maputo, Mozambique
- Dates: February 4–6, 2011

Team	Pld	W	L	MF	MA	Pts
Mozambique	2	2	0	8	0	4
Zimbabwe	2	1	1	4	4	3
Swaziland	2	0	2	0	8	2

	MOZ	SWZ	ZIM
Mozambique		4–0	4–0
Swaziland	0–4		0–4
Zimbabwe	0–4	4–0	

=== Zonal round 1 ===
Countries that didn't participate from the sub-zonal round are able to participate. The top 4 countries advance to the next round.

The following countries withdrew after playing in the sub-zonal round.

- Cameroon
- Senegal

The following countries entered without playing in the sub-zonal round.

- Cape Verde
- Republic of the Congo
- Democratic Republic of the Congo
- Ethiopia
- The Gambia
- Tanzania

==== Group A ====
- Host: Freetown, Sierra Leone
- Dates: July 3–5, 2011

Quarterfinals
July 3
Morocco	2
The Gambia	0
July 3
Cape Verde	2
Guinea-Bissau	0
July 3
Guinea	2
Liberia	0
Sierra Leone
BYE

Semifinals
July 4
Morocco	2
Cape Verde	0
July 4
Guinea	1
Sierra Leone	2

Final
July 5
Morocco	2
Sierra Leone	0
Third place
July 5
Cape Verde	2
Guinea	0

Losers' bracket

Semifinals
July 4
The Gambia	2
Guinea-Bissau	0
Liberia
BYE

5th place match
July 5
The Gambia	0
Liberia	2

- Morocco, Sierra Leone, Cape Verde and Guinea advanced to the next round.

==== Group B ====
- Host: Ghana
- Dates: August 16–18, 2011

Quarterfinals
Algeria
BYE
August 16
Niger	2
Togo	3
August 16
Nigeria	4
Benin	0
August 16
Ivory Coast	0
Ghana	4

Semifinals
August 17
Algeria	0
Togo	4
August 17
Nigeria	4
Ghana	0

Final
August 18
Togo	4
Nigeria	0
Third place
August 18
Algeria	3
Ghana	2

Losers' bracket

Semifinals
BYE
Niger
August 17
Benin	0
Ivory Coast	4

5th place match
August 18
Niger	4
Ivory Coast	0

- Togo, Nigeria, Algeria and Ghana advanced to the next round.

==== Group C ====
- Host: Libreville, Gabon
- Dates: August 5–7, 2011

Team	Pld	W	L	MF	MA	Pts
Democratic Republic of the Congo	2	2	0	7	1	4
Gabon	2	1	1	4	4	3
Republic of the Congo	2	0	2	1	7	2

	CGO	COD	GAB
Republic of the Congo		0–4	1–3
Democratic Republic of the Congo	4–0		3–1
Gabon	3–1	1–3	

==== Group D ====
- Host: Mombasa, Kenya
- Dates: July 27–29, 2011

Quarterfinals
Kenya
BYE
July 27
Ethiopia	3
Burundi	1
July 27
Uganda	2
Tanzania	0
Rwanda
BYE

Semifinals
July 28
Kenya	4
Ethiopia	0
July 28
Uganda	0
Rwanda	4

Final
July 29
Kenya	4
Rwanda	0
Third place
July 29
Uganda	4
Ethiopia	0

5th place match
July 28
Burundi	1
Tanzania	0

- Kenya, Rwanda, Uganda and Ethiopia advanced to the next round.

==== Group E ====
- Host: Maputo, Mozambique
- Dates: July 15–17, 2011

Quarterfinals
Mozambique
BYE
July 16
Swaziland	1
Zimbabwe	3
July 16
South Africa	4
Namibia	0
Mauritius
BYE

Semifinals
July 16
Mozambique	4
Zimbabwe	0
July 16
South Africa	2
Mauritius	3

Final
July 17
Mozambique	2
Mauritius	1
Third place
July 17
Zimbabwe	0
South Africa	2

5th place match
July 16
Swaziland	0
Namibia	4

- Mozambique, Mauritius, South Africa and Zimbabwe advanced to the next round.

=== Zonal round 2 ===
The top 2 of each pool qualifies to the African Continental Beach Volleyball Cup.

The following countries withdrew

- Cape Verde
- Republic of the Congo
- Ethiopia
- Ghana
- Zimbabwe

==== Pool 1 ====
- Host: Tomé, Togo
- Dates: October 14–16, 2011

Quarterfinals
Kenya
BYE
October 14
Togo	4
Guinea	0
South Africa
BYE
Gabon
BYE

Semifinals
October 15
Kenya	4
Togo	0
October 15
South Africa	4
Gabon	0

Final
October 16
Kenya	2
South Africa	3
Third place
October 16
Togo	3
Gabon	2

- South Africa and Kenya advanced to the finals.

==== Pool 2 ====
- Host: Agadir, Morocco
- Dates: October 11–13, 2011

Team	Pld	W	L	MF	MA	Pts
Morocco	1	1	0	4	0	2
Rwanda	1	0	1	0	4	1

	MAR	RWA
Morocco		4–0
Rwanda	0–4	

==== Pool 3 ====
- Host: Béjaïa, Algeria
- Dates: October 27–29, 2011

Semifinals
October 28
Algeria	4
Sierra Leone	0
October 28
Mozambique	4
Uganda	0

Final
October 29
Algeria	3
Mozambique	2

- Algeria and Mozambique advanced to the finals.

==== Pool 4 ====
- Host: Abuja, Nigeria
- Dates: October 28–30, 2011

Team	Pld	W	L	MF	MA	Pts
Democratic Republic of the Congo	2	2	0	6	4	4
Mauritius	2	1	1	5	5	3
Nigeria	2	0	2	4	6	2

	COD	MRI	NGR
Democratic Republic of the Congo		3–2	3–2
Mauritius	2–3		3–2
Nigeria	2–3	2–3	

=== Continental final ===
The following teams have qualified for the women's continental final.

- Algeria
- Democratic Republic of the Congo
- Kenya
- Mauritius
- Morocco
- Mozambique
- Rwanda
- South Africa

== See also ==
- Volleyball at the 2012 Summer Olympics
