= Cape Verde at the Olympics =

- IOC code: CPV
- NOC: Comité Olímpico Caboverdeano
- Medals Ranked 151st: Gold 0 Silver 0 Bronze 1 Total 1

Summer appearances
- 1996; 2000; 2004; 2008; 2012; 2016; 2020; 2024; 2028

Cape Verde (also known as Cabo Verde, its official IOC name) has sent athletes to every Summer Olympic Games held since 1996. No athletes from Cape Verde have competed in any Winter Olympic Games.

The only category that Cape Verde has consistently competed since it began its participation in the Olympic Games in 1996, is Men's Marathon; its rank has improved from 94th (1996) to 67th (2000), dropping to 78th (2004), and reaching the best score, 48th in 2008. Other frequent modalities chosen for competition include athletics and gymnastics.

Cape Verde won their first medal at the 2024 Olympics when Daniel Varela de Pina won the bronze medal in Men’s Flyweight Boxing.

The National Olympic Committee for Cape Verde is Comité Olímpico Cabo-verdiano. It was started in 1989 and recognized in 1993.

== Medal tables ==
=== Medals by Summer Games ===
Games	Athletes	Gold	Silver	Bronze	Total	Rank
(United States) 1996 Atlanta	4	0	0	0	0	–
(Australia) 2000 Sydney	2	0	0	0	0	–
(Greece) 2004 Athens	3	0	0	0	0	–
(China) 2008 Beijing	3	0	0	0	0	–
(United Kingdom) 2012 London	3	0	0	0	0	–
(Brazil) 2016 Rio de Janeiro	5	0	0	0	0	–
(Japan) 2020 Tokyo	6	0	0	0	0	–
(France) 2024 Paris	7	0	0	1	1	84
(United States) 2028 Los Angeles	future event					
(Australia) 2032 Brisbane	future event					
Total		0	0	1	1	151

== Medalists ==
Medal	Name	Games	Sport	Event
Bronze	Daniel Varela de Pina	2024 Paris	Boxing	Men's 51 kg

== See also ==
- List of flag bearers for Cape Verde at the Olympics
- Cape Verde at the Paralympics
