= Cape Verde at the 2004 Summer Paralympics =

- IPC code: CPV
- NPC: Comité Caboverdeano Desp. Para Deficientes

in Athens
- Competitors: 3 in 2 sports
- Flag bearer: Paulo Cesar Tavares
- Medals: Gold 0 Silver 0 Bronze 0 Total 0

Summer Paralympics appearances (overview)
- 2004; 2008; 2012; 2016; 2020; 2024

Cape Verde made its Paralympic Games début by sending a delegation to compete at the 2004 Summer Paralympics in Athens, Greece. The delegation consisted in two track and field athletes who took part in shot put and discus events, and a single competitor in powerlifting. None of them won a medal.

== Athletics ==
=== Men's field ===
Athlete	Class	Event	Final		
Athlete	Class	Event	Result	Points	Rank
Paulo Cesar Correira	F44/46	Discus	30.04	601	12

=== Women's field ===
Athlete	Class	Event	Final		
Athlete	Class	Event	Result	Points	Rank
Artimiza Sequeira	F42-46	Discus	16.56	831	13
Artimiza Sequeira	F42-46	Shot put	5.19	693	15

== Powerlifting ==
Athlete	Event	Result	Rank
Paulo Cesar Tavares	Men's 82.5kg	120.0	16

== See also ==
- Cape Verde at the Paralympics
- Cape Verde at the 2004 Summer Olympics
