= Maria Andrade =

Cape Verdean taekwondo athlete

Personal information
- Nationality: Cape Verdean
- Born: 19 March 1993 (age 33)
- Height: 169 cm (5 ft 7 in)
- Weight: 49 kg (108 lb)

Sport
- Sport: Taekwondo

Achievements and titles
- Olympic finals: 2016 Summer Olympics
Medal record
Representing Cape Verde
Women's taekwondo
African Taekwondo Championships
Bronze medal – third place	2018 Agadir	-49 kg

Maria Andrade Teixeira (born 19 March 1993) is a Cape Verdean taekwondo athlete.

She competed at the 2016 Summer Olympics in Rio de Janeiro in the women's 49 kg, where she lost to Panipak Wongpattanakit in the preliminaries. She was the flag bearer for Cape Verde during the Parade of Nations and the closing ceremony.

Olympic Games
Preceded by Adysângela Moniz	Flagbearer for Cape Verde; 2016 Rio de Janeiro	Succeeded by Jayla Pina; Jordin Andrade
