= Lenira Santos =

Cape Verdean sprinter

Personal information
- Full name: Lenira Santos
- Nationality: Cape Verdean
- Born: April 21, 1987 (age 39)
- Height: 1.78 m (5 ft 10 in)
- Weight: 69 kg (152 lb)

Sport
- Country: Cape Verde
- Sport: Athletics
- Events: 100 metres; 200 metres; 400 metres

Achievements and titles
- Personal bests: 100 metres: 12.72 (2004); 200 metres: 25.91 (2003); 400 metres: 57.15 (2004); 400 metres hurdles : 1:04.91 (2004)
- Updated on 2 January 2014

Lenira Santos (born 21 April 1987) is a Cape Verdean sprinter.

Santos was due to compete in the Women's 200 metres at the 2008 Summer Olympics but later pulled out due to injury.

Santos also competed in the 200 and 400 metre events at the 2006 Lusophony Games in Macau.
