= Victor Alvares de Oliveira =

Cape Verdean foil fencer (born 1996)

Personal information
- Nationality: French, Cape Verdean
- Born: 25 August 1996 (age 29) Reims, France

Fencing career
- Sport: Fencing
- Country: Cape Verde
- Weapon: Foil
- Hand: Right-handed

Victor Alvares de Oliveira (born 25 August 1996) is a foil fencer. Born in France, he qualified to represent Cape Verde at the 2024 Summer Olympics.

== Biography ==
Alvares de Oliveira was born to a Cape Verdean father and a Spanish-Portuguese mother; he grew up in Reims, France, and has dual Cape Verdean-French citizenship. According to Olympics.com, he grew up with severe asthma and thus spent "large portions of his formative years in the confines of paediatric wards." He liked the sport of fencing growing up, but doctors give him little chance of ever being successful in the sport due to his condition. However, he began competing in foil events nonetheless and still managed to perform well; he said that "I still had to do twice the effort of other athletes when we were doing exercises. But my asthma was getting better."

Alvares de Oliveira, a member of the club Courbevoie Escrime, rose through the fencing ranks and made the French national team. He also ranked at one time in the top 20 globally for junior foil fencers. He moved to Paris to train further in fencing, with the goal of ultimately reaching the Olympics. In 2018, he contacted the Cape Verdean sports authorities with the intention of honoring his father's heritage by competing internationally for them. He competed for them at the Fencing World Cup in 2019, and became the first-ever professional fencer for Cape Verde; he had the second-best placement among African foil fencers at the tournament. He competed for Cape Verde at the Fencing Grand Prix in 2021, with hopes of qualifying for the postponed 2020 Summer Olympics, although he did not qualify, with a loss to Salim Heroui in the final. Although unable to qualify for the Olympics that year, he participated at the African championships and won the silver medal.

Alvares de Oliveira competed for Cape Verde at the 2022 African championships and at the 2023 World Fencing Championships, where in foil he placed 78th out of 177 participants. He competed at the African Olympic qualifying tournaments in 2024, but finished sixth in foil due to an injury. However, he was afterwards invited to compete at the 2024 Summer Olympics in foil on a universality selection. He became the first Olympic fencer in Cape Verde's history.
