= Adysângela Moniz =

Cape Verdean Olympic judoka

Adysângela Moniz (born 9 May 1987 in Ilha de Santiago, Cape Verde) is a Cape Verdean judoka. She competed at the 2012 Summer Olympics in the Women +78kg event. She was also the flag bearer for Cape Verde at the opening ceremony.

Olympic Games
Preceded by Wania Monteiro	Flagbearer for Cape Verde; 2012 London	Succeeded by Maria Andrade
