= Latroya Pina =

Cape Verdean swimmer (born 1996)

Personal information
- Born: 2 June 1996 (age 30) Seekonk, Massachusetts, US

Sport
- Sport: Swimming

Latroya Pina (born 2 June 1996) is a Cape Verdean swimmer.

In 2019, she represented Cape Verde at the 2019 World Aquatics Championships held in Gwangju, South Korea. She competed in the women's 50 metre freestyle and women's 100 metre freestyle events. In both events she did not advance to compete in the semi-finals.

LaTroya (along with her brother Troy and sister Jayla) lived in Massachusetts, where she was discovered by the Cape Verdean athletics association and asked to join the country's first Olympic swim team. The three siblings are dual citizens of the United States and Cape Verde.

LaTroya graduated from Seekonk High School in Massachusetts and attends Howard University in Washington, D.C., where she holds a number of college swim records.

In 2018, Pina was named to the Eastern College Athletic Conference (ECAC) President's Honor Roll and was selected to the Mid-Eastern Athletic Conference (MEAC) Commissioner's All-Academic Team twice (2018 & 2019). Pina is working toward a Master's in biology at Howard.

Olympic Games
