= Cape Verde at the 2012 Summer Olympics =

- IOC code: CPV
- NOC: Comité Olímpico Caboverdeano

in London
- Competitors: 3 in 2 sports
- Flag bearers: Adysângela Moniz (opening); Ruben Sança (closing)
- Medals: Gold 0 Silver 0 Bronze 0 Total 0

Summer Olympics appearances (overview)
- 1996; 2000; 2004; 2008; 2012; 2016; 2020; 2024; 2028

Cape Verde competed at the 2012 Summer Olympics which were held in London, United Kingdom, from 27 July to 12 August 2012. The country's participation at London marked its fifth appearance in the Summer Olympics since its debut in 1996. The delegation included Ruben Sança, a long-distance runner; Lidiane Lopes, a sprinter; and Adysângela Moniz, a judoka. Moniz and Sança were also selected as the flag bearers for the opening and closing ceremonies respectively. Of the three Cape Verdean athletes, only Moniz progressed further than the first round.

== Background ==
Cape Verde participated in five Summer Olympic games between its debut in the 1996 Summer Olympics in Atlanta, US, and the 2012 Summer Olympics in London. The highest number of Cape Verdean athletes participating in a summer games is three in the 1996 games in Atlanta, US, the 2004 games in Athens, Greece, and in the 2012 games in London. No Cape Verdean athlete has ever won a medal at the Olympics. Three athletes from Cape Verde were selected to compete in the London games; Ruben Sança in the track and field 5000 m, Lidiane Lopes in the track and field 100 m and Adysângela Moniz in the judo +78kg.

== Athletics ==
Cape Verde was represented by one male athlete at the 2012 Olympics in athletics – Ruben Sança, a 5000 metres runner. Making his Olympic debut at these Games, Sança was given a university place after previously competing in the marathon at the 2011 World Championships and the 1500 meters at the 2009 Lusophony Games. He competed on 8 August in the 5000 metres event, finishing last out of 21 athletes in heat two in a time of 14 minutes and 35.19 seconds. He was 1 minute and 20.04 seconds behind the winner of his heat, Dejen Gebremeskel. Overall he finished 40th out of 43 athletes, (Note: One athlete, Hassan Hirt, was disqualified and another, Teklemariam Medhin did not start.) and he was 1 minute and 13.98 seconds slower than the slowest athlete that progressed to the final round and, therefore, that was the end of his competition.

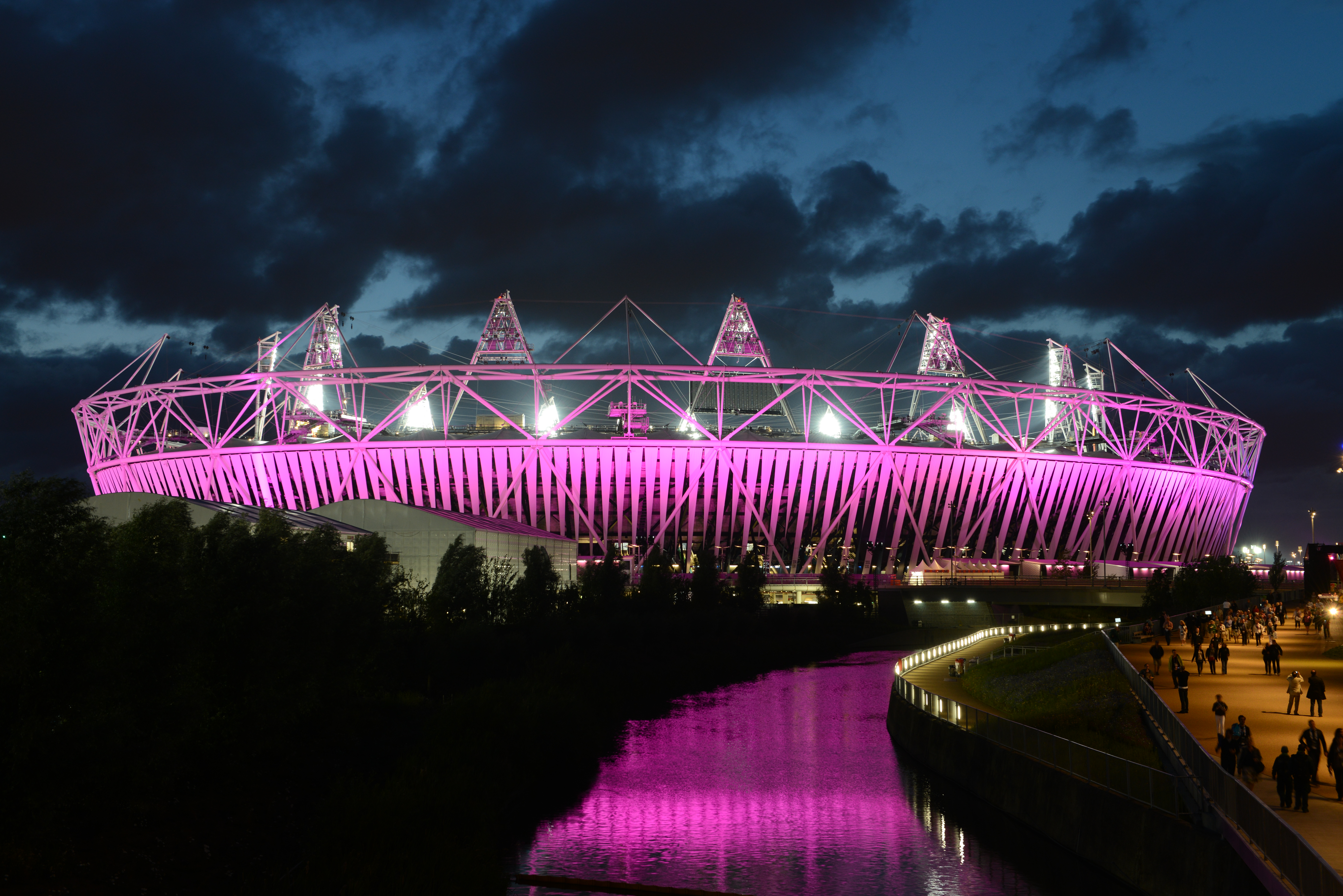
The London Olympic Stadium, where Sança and Lopes competed in track and field events

Competing at her first Olympics, Lidiane Lopes was the youngest ever competitor for Cape Verde at the Olympics, aged 17. She competed in the 100 meters on 3 August. Lopes was drawn into heat four and ran a time of 12.72 seconds and finished fourth in her preliminary heat, 1.12 seconds behind the winner, Toea Wisil. She finished 17th out of 33 athletes overall and was 0.48 seconds behind the slowest athlete who progressed to the heats. Therefore, Lopes did not progress to the heats.

Key

- Note–Ranks given for track events are within the athlete's heat only
- Q = Qualified for the next round
- q = Qualified for the next round as a fastest loser or, in field events, by position without achieving the qualifying target
- NR = National record
- N/A = Round not applicable for the event
- Bye = Athlete not required to compete in round

Athlete	Event	Heat		Quarterfinal		Semifinal		Final	
Athlete	Event	Result	Rank	Result	Rank	Result	Rank	Result	Rank
Ruben Sança	Men's 5000 m	14:35.19	21	—N/a				did not advance	
Lidiane Lopes	Women's 100 m	12.72	4	did not advance					

== Judo ==
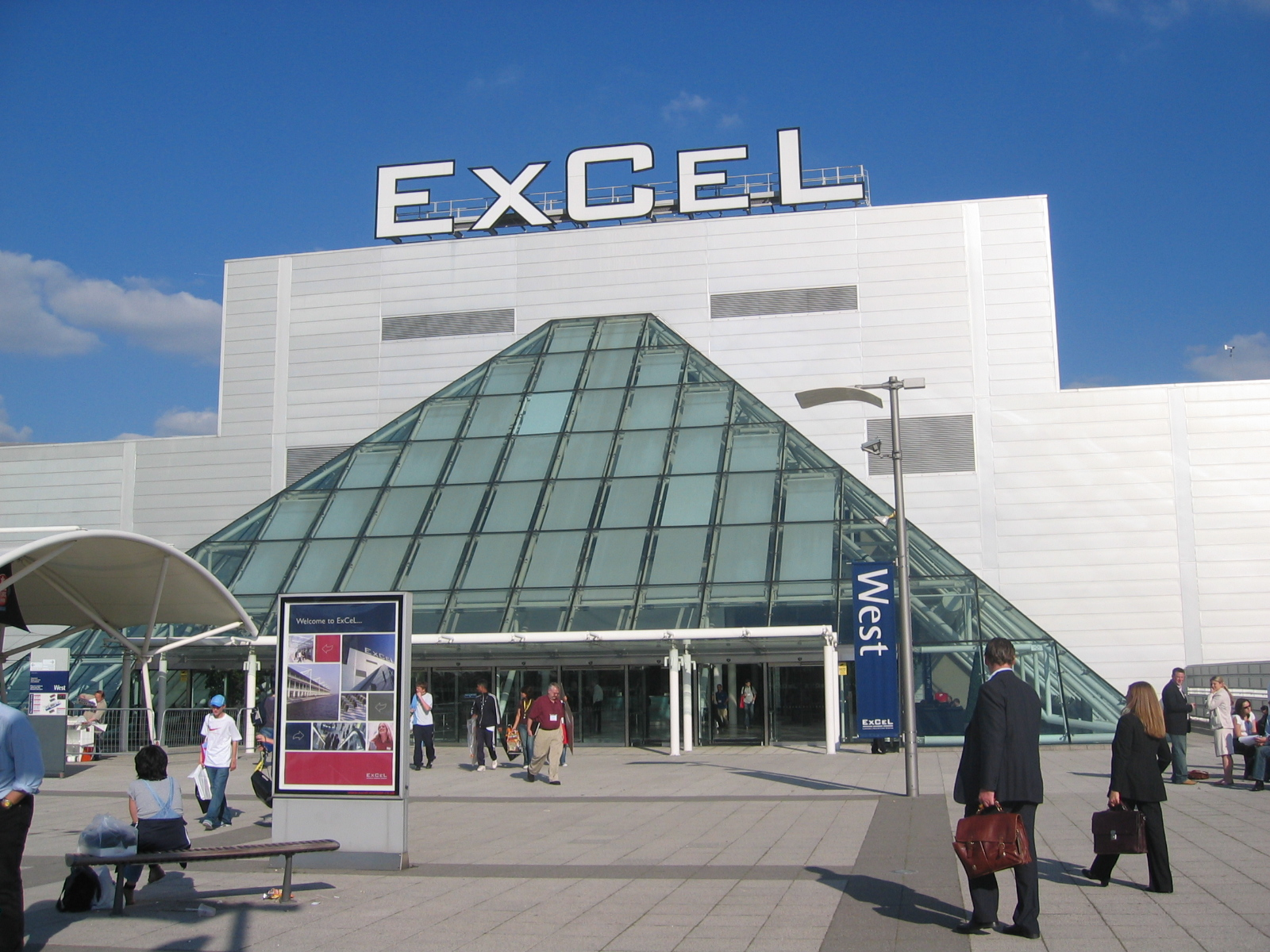
The ExCeL Exhibition Centre, where Moniz competed in the +78kg judo event

Cape Verde had one judoka competing in the 2012 Olympics. This woman was Adysângela Moniz, a 25-year-old athlete, competing at her first Olympic Games. She competed in the +78kg event. Moniz received a bye in the first round and fought in match four against Idalys Ortíz from Cuba in the second round. Moniz lost and therefore did not progress to the quarter-finals.

Athlete	Event	Round of 32	Round of 16	Quarterfinals	Semifinals	Repechage	Final / BM	
Athlete	Event	Opposition Result	Opposition Result	Opposition Result	Opposition Result	Opposition Result	Opposition Result	Rank
Adysângela Moniz	Women's +78 kg	Bye	Ortiz (CUB); L 0002–0103	did not advance				
