= Isménia do Frederico =

Cape Verdean sprinter

Isménia do Frederico OLY
Personal information
- Full name: Isménia do Frederico
- National team: Cape Verde
- Born: June 15, 1971 (age 55)
- Years active: 1992–2000
- Height: 1.54 m (5 ft 1 in)
- Weight: 49 kg (108 lb)

Sport
- Country: Cape Verde
- Sport: Athletics
- Events: 100 metres; 200 metres

Achievements and titles
- Personal bests: 100 metres: 12.75 (1997); 200 metres: 25.7 (1994)
- Updated on 2 January 2014

Isménia do Frederico (born 15 June 1971) is a Cape Verdean sprinter. She was the first woman to represent Cape Verde at the Olympics.

Do Frederico, a two-time Olympian, first competed for Cape Verde at the 1993 World Championships where she ran the 100 metres in 13.03 seconds. Three years later at the 1996 Summer Olympics in Atlanta, Do Frederico made history along with António Zeferino and Henry Andrade by becoming the first athletes to represent the tiny African nation at the Olympic Games. In the women's 100 metres she finished 52nd in a time of 13.03 seconds. The following year she competed in the 1997 Francophone Games, recording her all time personal best in the 100 metres with a time of 12.75 seconds. At the 2000 Summer Olympics in Sydney, Do Frederico had the honour of being the flag bearer at the opening ceremony. In 100 metres, she finished in 78th place crossing the line in 12.99 seconds.

Olympic Games
Preceded by Manuel Jesús Rodrígues	Flagbearer for Cape Verde; 2000 Sydney	Succeeded by Wania Monteiro
