= 2018 African Swimming Championships – Women's 400 metre freestyle =

Women's 400 metre freestyle at the 2018 African Swimming Championships
- Venue: Mohamed Boudiaf Olympic Complex
- Dates: 12 September (heats and final)
- Competitors: 10 from 8 nations
- Winning time: 4:21.76

Medalists
| gold medal | Hania Moro | Egypt |
| silver medal | Jessica Whelan | South Africa |
| bronze medal | Souad Cherouati | Algeria |

The Women's 400 metre freestyle competition of the 2018 African Swimming Championships was held on 12 September 2018.

== Records ==
Prior to the competition, the existing world and championship records were as follows.

| | Name | Nation | Time | Location | Date |
|---|---|---|---|---|---|
| World record | Katie Ledecky | United States | 3:56.46 | Rio de Janeiro | 7 August 2016 |
| African record | Karin Prinsloo | South Africa | 4:07.92 | Perth | 31 January 2014 |
| Championship record | Melissa Corfe | South Africa | 4:14.23 | Casablanca | 7 May 2004 |

== Results ==
=== Heats ===
The heats were started on 12 September at 9:30.

| Rank | Name | Nationality | Time | Notes |
|---|---|---|---|---|
| 1 | Hania Moro | Egypt | 4:28.78 | Q |
| 2 | Jessica Whelan | South Africa | 4:32.36 | Q |
| 3 | Souad Cherouati | Algeria | 4:34.03 | Q |
| 4 | Tori Oliver | South Africa | 4:35.08 | Q |
| 5 | Majda Chebaraka | Algeria | 4:35.62 | Q |
| 6 | Menna Kchouk | Tunisia | 4:38.33 | Q |
| 7 | Therese Soukup | Seychelles | 4:48.79 | Q |
| 8 | Ayat El Anouar | Morocco | 4:55.09 | Q |
| 9 | Catarina Trigo | Cape Verde | 5:14.24 | |
| | Antsa Rabesahala | Madagascar | Did not start | |

=== Final ===
The final was started on 12 September.

| Rank | Lane | Name | Nationality | Time | Notes |
|---|---|---|---|---|---|
| 1st place, gold medalist(s) | 4 | Hania Moro | Egypt | 4:21.76 | |
| 2nd place, silver medalist(s) | 5 | Jessica Whelan | South Africa | 4:23.76 | |
| 3rd place, bronze medalist(s) | 3 | Souad Cherouati | Algeria | 4:24.42 | |
| 4 | 2 | Majda Chebaraka | Algeria | 4:33.43 | |
| 5 | 7 | Menna Kchouk | Tunisia | 4:37.08 | |
| 6 | 6 | Tori Oliver | South Africa | 4:37.36 | |
| 7 | 1 | Therese Soukup | Seychelles | 4:48.86 | |
| 8 | 8 | Ayat El Anouar | Morocco | 4:51.43 | |
