= Alfayaya Embalo =

Cape Verdean sprinter

Personal information
- Full name: Alfayaya Embalo
- Nationality: Cape Verdean

Sport
- Country: Cape Verde
- Sport: Athletics
- Events: 100 metres; 200 metres

Achievements and titles
- Personal best: 200 metres: 22.04 (1997) NR
- Updated on 2 January 2014

Alfayaya Embalo (born 20 March 1977) is a Cape Verdean sprinter.

Embalo qualified for the men's 100 metres at the 1996 Summer Olympics in Atlanta, but did not start in the race. The following year in a meet in Barcelona, Spain, Embalo run the 200 metres in 22.04 seconds, a Cape Verdean record which still stands today.
