= Jordin Andrade =

American-Cape Verdean hurdler

Personal information
- Born: May 5, 1992 (age 34) Federal Way, Washington, U.S.
- Height: 6 ft 0 in (1.83 m)

Sport
- Country: Cape Verde
- Sport: Track and field
- Events: 400 metres hurdles, 400 meters
- College team: Boise State Broncos
- Club: Portugal athletics club (2017) 400 m: 47.03 400 m hurdles: 49.24
Medal record
Men's athletics
Representing the United States
Pan American Junior Championships
Silver medal – second place	2011 Miramar	400 m hurdles
Representing Cape Verde
Jeux de la Francophonie
Gold medal – first place	2017 Abidjan	400 m hurdles

Jordin Jae Andrade (born May 5, 1992) is a track and field hurdler representing Cape Verde at the Olympics in 2016 and 2020 and World Championships in 2017. Dr Jordin Andrade specializes in the 400-meter hurdles. He was a silver medalist in the event at 2015 NCAA Division I Outdoor Track and Field Championships.

== Professional ==
Andrade won gold in 400 hurdles at 2017 Jeux de la Francophonie and placed 26th in 50.32 at World Championships. He placed second in 49.91 at the 2017 So Cal Jim Bush Championships USATF West Region Track & Field Championships at Pomona Pitzer on June 3. Andrade placed 5th in 50.06 at the 2017 Jamaica Invitational 400 meters hurdles final in May. On May 3 at the Track Town, U.S.A. Oregon Twilight Invitational Meet, the record was set in Men's 400m Hurdle by Andrade in 50.88, breaking the old mark of 50.89 set in 1989 by B. Wright. Andrade placed 5th in 51.29 in 2017 Mt. SAC Relays 400 meters hurdles Invitational final in April.

Andrade was selected to represent Cape Verde at the 2016 Olympics. He qualified into the semi-final round, where he placed 16th in 49.32. Andrade placed third in 400 hurdles at 2016 Mt SAC Relays. Andrade is 51st in the world rankings in the 400 hurdles.

Jordin's uncle Henry Andrade, was elected to run for the Cape Verde Islands in the 1996 Olympics.

Andrade placed 16th in the 400 hurdles at 2015 USA Outdoor Track and Field Championships held at Hayward Field in Eugene, Oregon. He met the 400 hurdles Athletics at the 2016 Summer Olympics – Qualification at 2015 NCAA Division I Outdoor Track and Field Championships.

Andrade placed 17th in the 400 hurdles at 2013 USA Outdoor Track and Field Championships held at Drake Stadium in Des Moines, Iowa.

World Express Sports Management represents Jordin with agent Mark Pryor.

Year	Competition	Venue	Position	Event	Notes
Olympics, World Championships, African Games
Representing the Cape Verde
2022	World Championships	Eugene, Oregon	36th	400m hurdles	DNF
2021	Summer Olympics	Tokyo, Japan	32nd	400m hurdles	50.64
2019	African Games	Rabat, Morocco	12th	400m hurdles	51.65
2017	World Championships	London, England	26th	400m hurdles	50.32
2017	Jeux de la Francophonie	Abidjan, Ivory Coast	1st	400m hurdles	49.66
2016	Olympic Games	Rio de Janeiro, Brazil	16th	400m hurdles	49.32
Representing the United States
2011	Pan American Junior Championships	Miramar, Florida, United States	2nd	400m hurdles	52.09

== College career ==
Andrade finished first in the 2011 Southern California Community College Championships in 400 meter hurdles in 51.98 s. He was 2011 400H champion USATF Junior Outdoor Championships in 51.61. Following this feat he then went on to place 2nd at the Junior Pan-Am games representing USA in Miramar, Florida.

Andrade finished first in the 2012 California Community College Championships in 400 meter hurdles in 50.94 s. He attended Mt. San Antonio College in Walnut, California. Following Mt. SAC, he continued his education at Boise State University.

Andrade finished first in the 400 meters at the 2013 Mountain West Conference Indoor Championships. He finished first in the 400 meters hurdles at the 2013 Mountain West Conference Outdoor Championships and was champion 4x400m relay (3:12.44) at the 2013 Mountain West Conference Outdoor Championships.

Andrade finished second in the 400 meter hurdles at 2015 NCAA Division I Outdoor Track and Field Championships in 49.24.

Year	Mountain West Indoor	NCAA Indoor	Mountain West Outdoor	NCAA Outdoor
2012-13	200 10th	-	4x100 3rd	
2012-13	400 1st	-	400 hurdles 1st	400 hurdles 26th
2012-13	4x400 1st	-	4x400 1st	4x400 36th
2013-14	4x400 6th	-	-	-
2013-14	400 5th	-	-	-
2014-15	4x400 3rd	-	4x400 2nd	
2014-15	400 2nd	-	400 hurdles 1st	400 hurdles 2nd

Andrade won his final Mountain West Conference title in May 2015. He graduated with a degree in Environmental Studies in 2015.

== High school career ==
Andrade finished third in the 2010 Washington State High School Track and Field Championships in 1600 meter relay and fifth in 300 m hurdles in 39.02 s. He attended Bonney Lake High School in Bonney Lake, Washington.

Olympic Games
Preceded by Maria Andrade	Flag bearer for Cape Verde; 2020 Tokyo with Jayla Pina	Succeeded by Daniel Varela de Pina; Djamila Silva
