= Gracelino Barbosa =

Cape Verdean Paralympic athlete

Gracelino Tavares Barbosa
Personal information
- Born: 1 February 1985 (age 41) Tarrafal, Cape Verde
- Height: 1.85 m (6 ft 1 in)

Sport
- Country: Cape Verde
- Sport: Paralympic athletics
- Disability class: T20
Medal record
Paralympic athletics
Representing Cape Verde
Paralympic Games
Bronze medal – third place	2016 Rio de Janeiro	400m T20
INAS Global Games
Gold medal – first place	2015 Guayaquil	110m hurdles
Gold medal – first place	2015 Guayaquil	400m hurdles
Gold medal – first place	2019 Brisbane	400m hurdles
Bronze medal – third place	2019 Brisbane	400m
Bronze medal – third place	2019 Brisbane	110m hurdles
INAS World Outdoor Athletics Championships
Gold medal – first place	2009 Jablonec nad Nasou	110m hurdles
Gold medal – first place	2009 Jablonec nad Nasou	400m hurdles
Gold medal – first place	2011 Bangkok	100m
Gold medal – first place	2011 Bangkok	110m hurdles
Gold medal – first place	2011 Bangkok	400m hurdles
Silver medal – second place	2009 Jablonec nad Nasou	200m
Silver medal – second place	2009 Jablonec nad Nasou	400m
INAS World Indoor Athletics Championships
Gold medal – first place	2016 Ancona	60m hurdles
Silver medal – second place	2018 Val de Reuil	60m
Bronze medal – third place	2016 Ancona	400m
Bronze medal – third place	2018 Val de Reuil	200m

Gracelino Tavares Barbosa (born 1 February 1985) is a Cape Verdean Paralympic athlete who competes in the T20 category. Barbosa represented his home country at the 2016 Summer Paralympics, where he won the bronze medal in the 400 meters race, subsequently becoming the first in the country to medal at the Paralympics.

== Career ==
Growing up in Cape Verde, Barbosa originally intended to compete in football but a broken toe encouraged him to transition into track and field. Barbosa represented his home country at the 2016 Summer Paralympics, where he won the bronze medal in the 400 meters T20 subsequently becoming the first in the country to medal at the Paralympics. Following this, Barbosa competed at the IX World Championship, run through the International Sports Federation for Persons with Intellectual Disability, and won the 400 meters hurdles, 100 meters and 110 meters hurdles. As a result of his accomplishments, he received the Second Grade of the Medal of Sport Merit in Cape Verde in 2017.

In 2018, Barbosa competed at the World Championship of the International Federation of Sports for Athletes with Intellectual Disabilities in France and won three medals. He won a bronze medal in the 200 meters, a gold medal in the 60 meters, and silver in the 60 meters hurdles. Two years later, Barbosa continued to compete in international games and won multiple titles. In March 2020, Barbosa competed at the World Athletics Indoor Tour in Toruń, Poland and placed first in the 60 meters and 60 meters hurdles. He remained in Poland for the World Cup and won a gold medal in the 400 meter hurdles.
