= Elyane Boal =

Cape Verdean rhythmic gymnast

- Born: 26 April 1998 (age 28)

Gymnastics career
- Discipline: Rhythmic gymnastics
- Country represented: Cape Verde (2015)

Elyane Boal (born 26 April 1998) is a Cape Verdean former individual rhythmic gymnast.

== Biography ==
Boal began training when she was six after her grandmother brought her to a gym. Boal was initially scared of the training, but after watching practices, she began to like the sport.

She intended to compete at the 2014 World Championships, but she had to withdraw due to a knee injury that occurred in training. Instead, she debuted at the 2015 World Championships and placed 111th there. For the 2016 Summer Olympics in Rio de Janeiro, Cape Verde was given a tripartite spot in rhythmic gymnastics. Boal was selected to compete at the Olympics, where she placed 26th in the qualifying round and did not advance to the final. She was the only black woman competing in the event. Boal said that she was "surprised and moved" by the enthusiastic response she received from the audience, as she knew that she would not place high.
