= Wania Monteiro =

Cape Verdean rhythmic gymnast

- Born: 9 August 1986 (age 40) Santa Catarina
- Height: 170 cm (5 ft 7 in)

Gymnastics career
- Discipline: Rhythmic gymnastics
- Country represented: Cape Verde
- Assistant coaches: Santa Catarina, Santiago
Medal record
African Gymnastics Championships
| Gold medal – first place | 2004 Thiès | Hoop |
| Gold medal – first place | Cape Town 2006 | Clubs |
| Bronze medal – third place | 2004 Thiès | All-Around |
| Bronze medal – third place | Cape Town 2006 | Rope |
| Bronze medal – third place | Cape Town 2006 | Ball |
| Bronze medal – third place | Cape Town 2006 | Ribbon |

Wania Monteiro (born 9 August 1986) is a Cape Verdean former individual rhythmic gymnast who competed at the 2004 and 2008 Summer Olympics. She was the first gymnast from Cape Verde to compete at the Olympic Games.

== Early life ==
Monteiro was born 9 August 1986 in Santa Catarina, Santiago. She was trained by Elena Atmacheva. Time noted that she often trained "in a dilapidated gym with ceilings too low to accommodate a proper hoop or ball toss", due to a lack of adequate facilities in Cape Verde.

== Career ==
Monteiro competed at the 2001 World Championships, and two years later, she competed at the 2003 World Championships, where she finished in 106th place.

At the 2004 African Championships, Monteiro placed third in the all-around and also won gold in the hoop final. The Cape Verdean team placed second in the team competition.

Monteiro received a tripartite invitation to represent her country at the 2004 Summer Olympics in Athens, and she was Cape Verde's flag bearer during the Games's opening ceremony. She was also the first gymnast from Cape Verde to compete in the Olympic Games. She said of the experience, "I'm here to show that in Cape Verde we don't have conditions to train, but maybe if we had more conditions, we would have better gymnastics."

In 2006, she won four medals at the African Gymnastics Championships, three bronze and one gold.

In 2007, she competed at the World Championships, where she finished in 108th place.

Monteiro again received a tripartite invitation to compete at the 2008 Summer Olympics in Beijing, and was, again, her country's flagbearer during the Games' opening ceremony. She finished 24th, with an all-around score of 49.050 points.

In 2019, Monteiro represented Cape Verdean athletes during a visit from the president of the International Olympic Committee, Thomas Bach.

Olympic Games
| Preceded by Isménia do Frederico | Flagbearer for Cape Verde; 2004 Athens; 2008 Beijing | Succeeded by Adysângela Moniz |
