= António Zeferino =

Cape Verdean long-distance runner

Antonio Zeferino
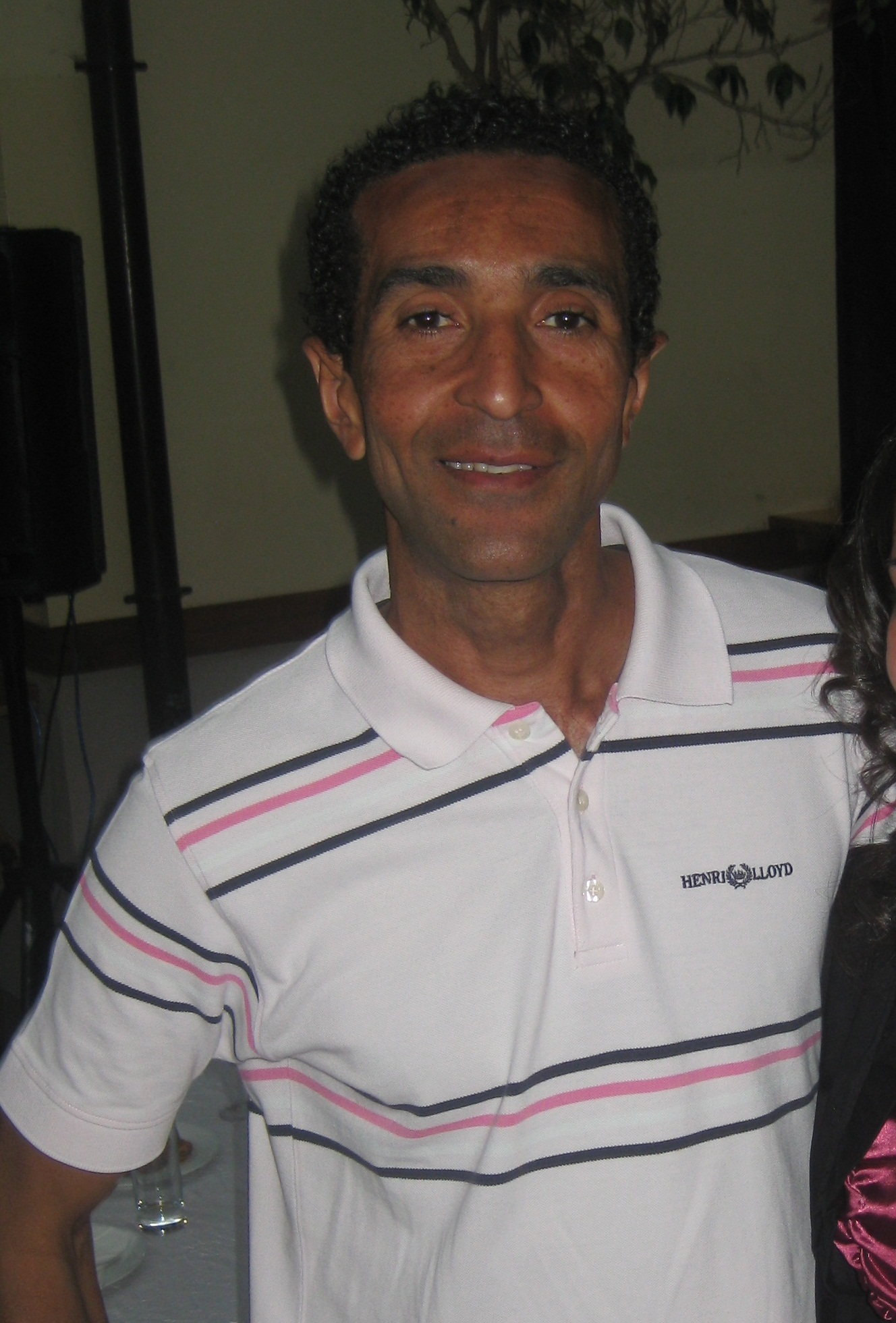
- Zeferino in 2012

Personal information
- Full name: António Carlos Pina Zeferino
- Nickname: Criminoso
- Nationality: Cape Verdean
- Born: 17 January 1966 (age 60) Cape Verde
- Years active: 1995–2004
- Height: 1.83 m (6 ft 0 in)
- Weight: 65 kg (143 lb)

Sport
- Country: Cape Verde
- Sport: Athletics
- Events: Marathon; Half marathon; 3000 metres steeplechase

Achievements and titles
- Personal bests: Marathon: 2:23:16 (1999); 3000 metres steeplechase: 9:42.80 (1995 NR)
- Updated on 30 December 2013

António Carlos Pina Zeferino (born 17 January 1966) is a Cape Verdean athlete, specializing in long-distance running, marathon and half marathon.

Zeferino, a three-time Olympian, first competed for Cape Verde in a meet in Maia, Portugal setting a national record in the 3000 metres steeplechase which still stands today. The following year at the 1996 Summer Olympics in Atlanta, Zeferino made history along with Henry Andrade and Isménia do Frederico by becoming the first athletes to represent the tiny African nation at the Olympic Games. In the men's marathon he finished 94th in a time of 2:34:13. The following year he competed in the 1997 World Championships, finishing 37th in the marathon with a time of 2:25:56. Two years later in February 1999, Zeferino recorded his best ever time in the marathon at the Sevilla Marathon finishing in 2:23:16. Six months later at the 1999 Championships, he finished the marathon slightly slower in 2:26:03 which placed him in 39th position. At the 2000 Summer Olympics in Sydney, Zeferino improved on time and position from four years earlier crossing the line in 67th place in a time of 2:29:46. The following year, he completed at the 2001 World Championships, where he finished the marathon in 51st place in 2:32:46. Zeferino's final race was the marathon at the 2004 Athens Games where aged 38, he finished in 78th with a time of 2:36:22.

Zeferino also completed in the 1998, 1999 and the 2003 IAAF World Half Marathon Championships finishing 117th, 91st and 70th respectively and also completed in the 1999 and the 2000 IAAF World Cross Country Championships – Senior men's race where he finished in 141st and 145th place respectively.

After retiring from active competition Zeferino became an English teacher in Barcelos, Portugal where he resides.
