= Márcio Fernandes (athlete) =

Cape Verdean Paralympic athlete

Marcio Fernandes
Personal information
- Nationality: Caboverdiana
- Born: Marcio Miguel da Costa Fernandes; 18 May 1983 (age 43) Funchal, Madeira, portugal

Sport
- Country: Cape Verde
- Sport: Athletics
- Event(s): Sprint; F44 javelin
- Team: Bedford &county UK
- Coached by: Carlos Fernandes

Achievements and titles
- Paralympic finals: 2012; 2016
Medal record
Track and field (athletics)
Representing Cape Verde
IPC World Championships
Gold medal – first place	2015 Doha	Javelin - F44
Silver medal – second place	2013 Lyon	Javelin - F44
African Games
Gold medal – first place	2015 Brazzaville	Javelin - T42/44
Silver medal – second place	2015 Brazzaville	Discus - T43/44

Márcio Miguel da Costa Fernandes (born 18 May 1983) is a Paralympic athlete who has represented Cape Verde at both the 2012 and the 2012 Summer Paralympics. He was born in Portugal to Cape Verdean parents. He lost his leg in a car accident at age 10. He is the first Cape Verdean athlete to participate at a Paralympic Games on merit rather than invitation.
