= Henry Andrade =

American-Cape Verdean hurdler (born 1962)

Personal information
- Nationality: American-Cape Verdean
- Born: April 17, 1962 (age 64) Sacramento, California, USA
- Height: 180 cm (5 ft 11 in)
- Weight: 73 kg (161 lb)

Sport
- Sport: Athletics
- Event: Hurdles

Henry Manuel Andrade (born April 17, 1962) is an American-Cape Verdean hurdler. He was one of the best hurdlers in the United States during the 1980s and early 1990s. After years of frustration in the American Olympic trials, he achieved his opportunity to compete in the Olympics by obtaining dual citizenship through his parents' ancestry and representing the Cape Verde Islands in the 1996 Summer Olympics at the age of 34. However, when his Olympic moment was to occur, he showed up with a severe injury and was unable to make it out of the heats. Earlier in the season, he set the Cape Verde national record in the 110m hurdles, 13.78, at the Modesto Relays.

== Career ==
A graduate of Hiram W. Johnson High School in Sacramento, California Andrade finished third in the 300 meter hurdles at the 1979 CIF California State Meet, then won the 400 metre hurdles and was second in the 110 metre hurdles at the hometown 1980 Golden West Invitational, where he won the Maree Rodebaugh Award as the Most Inspirational Athlete.

Andrade ran collegiately at Southern Methodist University on a football scholarship, where, as wide receiver, he was a teammate of Eric Dickerson on the 1981 and 1982 National Championship football teams. Andrade's name was mentioned in connection with the Southern Methodist University football scandal that led to the program getting the death penalty. In 1983, he was also part of their National Championship track and field team. In 1985, he became the NCAA indoor champion in the 55 metres hurdles. Later that year, he won the NCAA Men's Outdoor Track and Field Championship in the 110 metre hurdles.

Andrade won the British AAA Championships title at the 1985 AAA Championships.

It has been reported that in 1987, Andrade found his way to the NFL as a strike replacement wide receiver for the New York Giants, but his name does not appear on NFL.com's historical player search, nor does his name appear on Pro-Football-Reference.com.

In his two attempts at the 1984 and 1992 U.S. Olympic trials, Andrade finished in 6th place at both.

Andrade received a master's degree in Physical Education at Long Beach State University in 1996, and has been working as a personal trainer. He remains an active masters track and field athlete. He is the manager of his nephew Jordin Andrade, who has also elected to run for the Cape Verde Islands in the Olympics.
