= Daniel Varela de Pina =

Cape Verdean boxer (born 1996)

Personal information
- Born: 7 August 1996 (age 30) Santa Cruz, Cape Verde
- Height: 5 ft 4 in (162.56 cm)

Sport
- Country: Cape Verde
- Sport: Boxing
- Weight class: Bantamweight Flyweight
Medal record
Men's boxing
Representing Cape Verde
Olympic Games
Bronze medal – third place	2024 Paris	Flyweight
African Championships
Bronze medal – third place	2022 Maputo	Bantamweight

Daniel David Varela de Pina (born 7 August 1996) is a Cape Verdean amateur boxer. He competed in the men's flyweight event at the 2020 Summer Olympics. Valera de Pina won a bronze medal at the 2022 African Amateur Boxing Championships in the bantamweight division. At the 2024 Summer Olympics, Varela de Pina was the flagbearer for his country at the opening ceremony and went on to make history by becoming the first ever Olympic medalist from Cape Verde, taking bronze in the flyweight division.Valera de Pina moved up to Bantamweight in 2025, and later in the year competed in the 2025 IBA Men's World Boxing Championships in Dubai, losing to Artur Nagapetyan in the Round of 16. Valera de Pina won the 2026 Portugal Cup. Valera de Pina won a silver medal at the 2026 IBA Men’s Elite Africa Boxing Championships, defeating Valery Yohot of Cameroon by a 5-0 decision in the quarterfinals , and defeating Philip Haoseb by injury stoppage semifinals, before losing to Gloire Kolongo Bakora by a controversial stoppage in the finals. IBA originally put Valera de Pina listed at the champion, later taking it down and putting up the real winner, the Cape Verdian delegation disagreed with the stoppage stating that Bakora was fouling and there was no grounds for the 3 standing 8 counts that triggered the stoppage.

== Olympic results ==
Tokyo 2020

- Round of 16: Lost to Shakhobidin Zoirov (Uzbekistan) 0-5

Paris 2024

- Round of 16: Defeated Thitistan Panmod (Thailand) 4-1
- Quarter-finals: Defeated Patrick Chinyemba (Zambia) 5-0
- Semi-finals: Lost to Hasanboy Dusmatov (Uzbekistan) 0-5

Olympic Games
Preceded by Jordin Andrade; Jayla Pina	Flag bearer for Cape Verde; 2024 Paris with Djamila Silva	Succeeded by Incumbent
