= Cape Verdean Olympic Committee =

National Olympic Committee

- Country: Cape Verde
- Code: CPV
- Created: 1989
- Recognized: 1993
- Continental Association: ANOCA
- Headquarters: Praia, Cape Verde
- President: Filomena Maria Fortes
- Secretary General: Nelso Martins Jesus
- Website: coc.cv

The Cape Verdean Olympic Committee (Portuguese: Comité Olímpico Cabo-verdiano) (IOC code: CPV) is the National Olympic Committee representing Cape Verde.

== See also ==
- Cape Verde at the Olympics
