= Troy Pina =

Cape Verdean swimmer

Personal information
- Nationality: Cape Verdean
- Born: 4 February 1999 (age 27) Providence, Rhode Island, US

Sport
- Sport: Swimming
- College team: Saint Peter's University

Troy Pina (born 4 February 1999) is a Cape Verdean swimmer. He competed in the men's 50 metre freestyle at the 2020 Summer Olympics. His sisters are fellow Olympic swimmers Jayla Pina and Latroya Pina.
