= Jayla Pina =

Cape Verdean swimmer (born 2004)

Personal information
- Nationality: American, Cape Verdean
- Born: 23 July 2004 (age 21) United States

Sport
- Country: Cape Verde
- Sport: Swimming
- College team: Pittsburgh Panthers
Medal record
Women's swimming
Representing Cape Verde
African Championships
Bronze medal – third place	2021 Accra	50 m breaststroke
Bronze medal – third place	2021 Accra	200 m individual medley

Jayla Pina (born 23 July 2004) is a swimmer currently competing for the collegiate swimming and diving team of the University of Pittsburgh. Born in the United States, she represents Cape Verde internationally. She competed in the women's 100 meter breaststroke at the 2020 Summer Olympics and the women's 200 meter individual medley at the 2024 Summer Olympics. Pina was born in the United States (raised in Seekonk, Massachusetts), but is able to represent Cape Verde through her mother, who was born there. Her brother is fellow Olympic swimmer, Troy Pina and her sister is swimmer Latroya Pina.

Olympic Games
Preceded by Maria Andrade	Flag bearer for Cape Verde; 2020 Tokyo with Jordin Andrade	Succeeded by Daniel Varela de Pina; Djamila Silva
