= Flag of Cape Verde =

Republic of Cabo Verde
- Use: National flag and ensign
- Proportion: 2:3
- Adopted: 25 September 1992
- Design: Five unequal-sized horizontal bands of blue, white, red, white, and blue (6:1:1:1:3), with a circle of ten yellow five-pointed stars charged on the hoist side, centred on the red band
- Designed by: Pedro Gregório

The national flag of Cape Verde (officially Cabo Verde) consists of five horizontal bands of blue, white, red, white, and blue, in a 6:1:1:1:3 ratio. A circle of ten yellow five-pointed stars – representing the ten islands that make up the country – is charged on the hoist (left) side of the flag, centred on the red band. The current Cape Verdean flag was adopted on 25 September 1992, replacing the flag that was adopted when the country became independent on 5 July 1975.

Cape Verde's first flag had two horizontal bands of yellow and green, with a vertical red band on the hoist side charged with a black five-pointed star framed by ears of corn and a sea shell. Like the flag of Guinea-Bissau, it was based on the flag of the African Party for the Independence of Guinea and Cape Verde (PAIGC), which fought for the independence of both countries from Portugal. The current flag was introduced to symbolise Cape Verde's transformation from a socialist state to a multi-party democracy.

== Design and symbolism ==
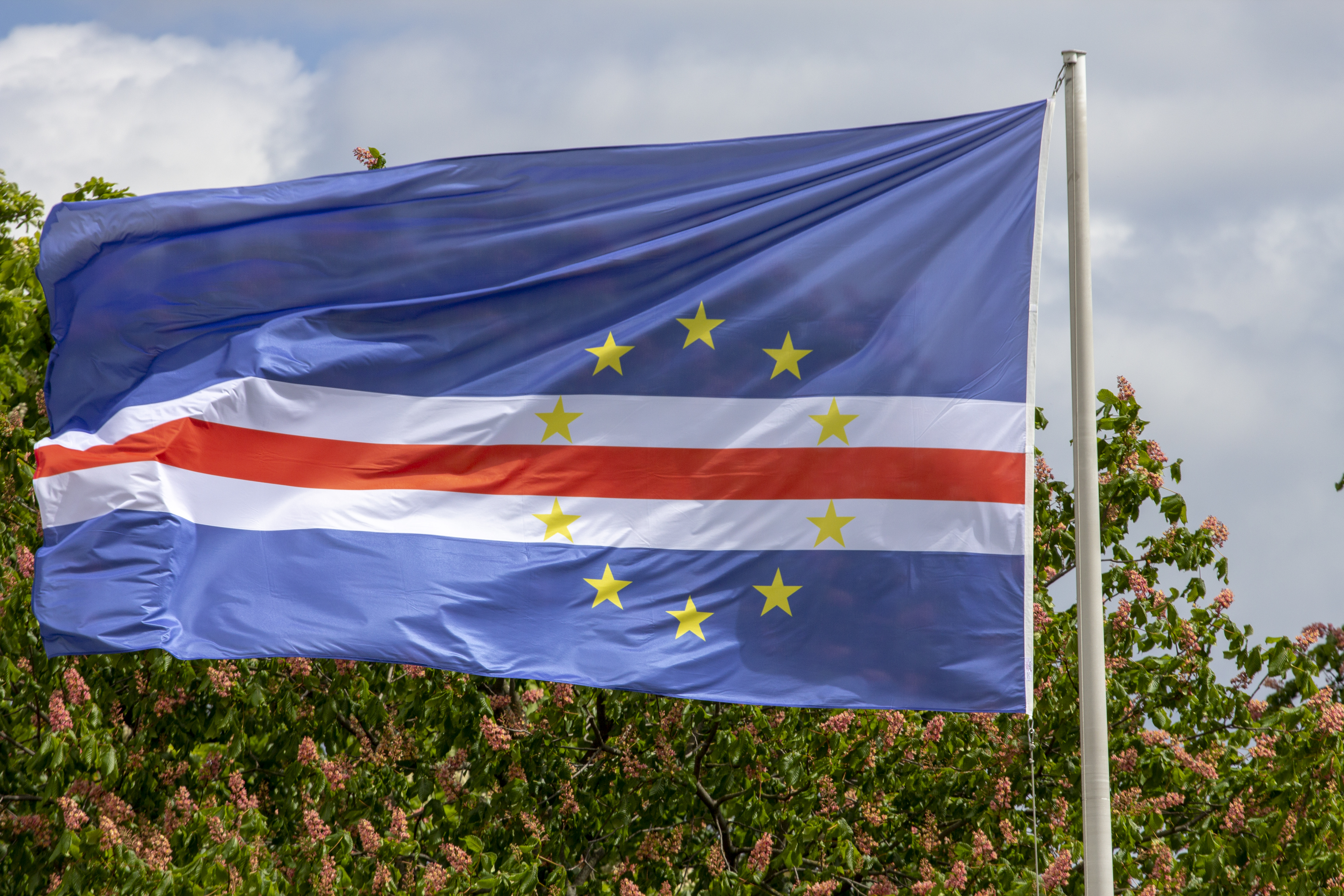
Reverse side of the flag of Cape Verde

The flag of Cape Verde is defined in the country's constitution as five unequal-sized horizontal bands, of which the outermost bands are blue, the bands adjacent to them are white, and the central band is red. The width (height) of the top and bottom blue bands are equal to one half and one quarter of the flag's width, respectively, while the red and white bands are equal to one twelfth (i.e. the ratio is 6:1:1:1:3). The flag is charged on the hoist side with a circle of ten yellow five-pointed stars, the centre of which is located at the intersection of a horizontal line in the middle of the red band and a vertical line positioned three-eighths of the flag's length from the hoist. The constitution does not mention a width-to-length ratio for the flag, but the Cape Verdean government published a graphical guide in 2009 to standardise the display of national symbols, and in it a 2:3 ratio is used. A 2:3 ratio is also used on the Cape Verdean government's website.

The Cape Verdean government gives the following significance to the flag's symbols: blue represents the sky and sea; white and red represent the Cape Verdeans' desire for peace and efforts in nation-building, respectively; and the ten stars represent the archipelago's ten islands, arranged in a circle to symbolise unity.

Construction sheet of the flag of Cape Verde

Standard colours of the flag of Cape Verde
Colour	Pantone	CMYK	RGB
Blue	287 C	100, 89, 8, 2	0, 56, 147
White	White	0, 0, 0, 0	255, 255, 255
Red	186 C	12, 100, 100, 3	207, 32, 39
Yellow	116 C	4, 15, 98, 0	247, 209, 22

== History ==
Portuguese settlers who arrived in 1462 were the first recorded inhabitants of Cape Verde. The islands were under Portuguese colonial rule until independence was granted on 5 July 1975, following the Carnation Revolution in Portugal proper and the end of the Portuguese Colonial War elsewhere in Lusophone Africa. The first Cape Verdean national flag was hoisted the same day the country became independent, but it was not until 19 April 1976 that the flag became official by law.

Cape Verde's first flag was based on that of the African Party for the Independence of Guinea and Cape Verde, or PAIGC, which led the country's one-party post-colonial government. Featuring the pan-African colours, it consisted of two horizontal bands of yellow and green, with a vertical red band on the hoist side charged with a black five-pointed star framed by ears of corn and a sea shell. Black symbolised the peoples of Africa "and their hope for dignity, liberty, and peace"; red the blood of those who fought for Cape Verde's independence and development; yellow the nation's culture and well-being; and green the agricultural sector and hope.

In the 1991 two-party election, the liberal Movement for Democracy defeated the African Party for the Independence of Cape Verde (PAICV), which had succeeded the PAIGC in 1980 as the country's sole ruling party. The following year, a contest was held to design a new national flag to symbolise Cape Verde's break with its socialist past. The winning design was created by architect Pedro Gregório, whose stated reason for participating was to create a flag that would not be mistaken for that of another nation, as the existing flag had been for Guinea-Bissau. The constitution was subsequently amended and the current national flag became official on 25 September 1992.

Flag of Cape Verde (1975–1992)

Flag of the African Party for the Independence of Guinea and Cape Verde

Flag of Guinea-Bissau
